= Pagliacci discography =

This is a partial discography of Pagliacci, an opera by Ruggero Leoncavallo which premiered at the Teatro Dal Verme in Milan on May 21, 1892 conducted by Arturo Toscanini.

== Stand-alone recordings ==
Year	Cast (Canio, Nedda, Tonio, Beppe, Silvio)	Conductor, Opera House and Orchestra	Label
1907	Antonio Paoli, Giuseppina Huguet, Francesco Cigada, Gaetano Pini-Corsi, Ernesto Badini	Carlo Sabajno, Teatro alla Scala orchestra and chorus	Audio CD: Bongiovanni; Cat: GB 1120-2
1917	Luigi Bolis, Annita Conti, Giuseppe Montanelli	Carlo Sabajno, Teatro alla Scala orchestra and chorus	LP: La voce del padrone Cat: S 5522-S 5536; R 5535-R 5537; Audio CD: Mike Richter "Audio Encyclopedia"; Cat: 301
1930	Francesco Merli, Rosetta Pampanini, Carlo Galeffi	Lorenzo Molajoli, Teatro alla Scala orchestra and chorus	Audio CD: Preiser Records; Cat: 20007
1934	Beniamino Gigli, Iva Pacetti, Mario Basiola	Franco Ghione, Teatro alla Scala orchestra and chorus	Audio CD: Naxos; Cat:8.110155
1948	Ramón Vinay, Florence Quartararo, Leonard Warren, Joseph Laderoute, Hugh Thompson	Giuseppe Antonicelli, Metropolitan Opera orchestra and chorus	Audio CD: Guild; Cat: 2291/2
1951	Richard Tucker, Lucine Amara, Giuseppe Valdengo	Fausto Cleva; Metropolitan Opera orchestra and chorus	Audio CD: Preiser Records; Cat: 20030
1951	Carlo Bergonzi, Carla Gavazzi, Carlo Tagliabue	Alfredo Simonetto; Italian Radio Symphony orchestra and chorus	Audio CD: Warner Fonit; Cat: 8573 87272-2
1952	Mario del Monaco, Clara Petrella, Afro Poli	Alberto Erede; Accademia Nazionale di Santa Cecilia orchestra and chorus	Audio CD: Omega Opera Archive; Cat: 1628
1953	Jussi Björling, Victoria de los Ángeles, Leonard Warren	Renato Cellini; RCA Victor Orchestra; Columbus Boys Choir; Robert Shaw Chorale	LP: RCA Victor; Cat: LM-6084; Audio CD: EMI Classics; Cat: 0724356677821
1954	Franco Corelli, Lucine Amara, Tito Gobbi	Lovro von Matačić; Teatro alla Scala orchestra and chorus	LP: Angel Records; Cat: 3618 B/L
1954	Giuseppe di Stefano, Maria Callas, Rolando Panerai	Tullio Serafin; Teatro alla Scala orchestra and chorus	Audio CD: Warner Classics; Cat: 2564633991
1956	Giuseppe di Stefano, Clara Petrella, Aldo Protti	Nino Sanzogno; Teatro alla Scala orchestra and chorus (live recording)	Audio CD: Myto; Cat: 8014399501088
1965	Carlo Bergonzi, Joan Carlyle, Giuseppe Taddei	Herbert von Karajan, Teatro alla Scala orchestra and chorus	Audio CD: Deutsche Grammophon; Cat: 449 727-2
1971	Plácido Domingo, Montserrat Caballé, Sherrill Milnes	Nello Santi; London Symphony Orchestra and chorus	LP: RCA Red Seal; Cat: LSC-7090; Audio CD: RCA Victor; Cat: 74321 50168-2
1984	Plácido Domingo, Ileana Cotrubas, Matteo Manuguerra	Ádám Fischer; Vienna State Opera orchestra and chorus	Audio CD: Orfeo; Cat: C756081B
1992	Nicola Martinucci, Miriam Gauci, Eduard Tumagian	Alexander Rahbari; Czecho-Slovak Radio Symphony Orchestra	Audio CD: Naxos; Cat: 8.660021
1993	Luciano Pavarotti, Daniela Dessi, Juan Pons, Paolo Coni	Riccardo Muti, The Philadelphia Orchestra	Audio CD: Philips Digital Classics; Cat: 438 132-2
1999	José Cura, Barbara Frittoli, Carlos Álvarez	Riccardo Chailly; Royal Concertgebouw Orchestra	Audio CD: Decca Records; Cat: 467 086-2
2019	Devid Cecconi, Leon Kim, Matteo Mezzaro, Valeria Sepe, Angelo Villari	Valerio Galli, Orchestra del Maggio Musicale Fiorentino	Blu-ray: Dynamic; EAN 8007144578633
2021	Russell Thomas, Ailyn Pérez, Quinn Kelsey, Eric Ferring, Lucas Meachem	Enrique Mazzola, Lyric Opera of Chicago	Streaming HD video: Lyric Opera of Chicago

== Paired with Pietro Mascagni's Cavalleria rusticana ==
Year	Cast (Canio, Nedda, Tonio)	Conductor, Opera House and Orchestra	Label
1929	Alessandro Valente, Adelaide Saraceni, Apollo Granforte	Carlo Sabajno, Teatro alla Scala orchestra and chorus	Phonograph; Cat: PH 5066/67
1954	Giuseppe Di Stefano, Maria Callas, Tito Gobbi	Tullio Serafin, Teatro alla Scala orchestra and chorus	Audio CD: EMI Classics; Cat: 0724358683028
1960	Franco Corelli, Lucine Amara, Tito Gobbi	Lovro von Matačić; Teatro alla Scala orchestra and chorus	Audio CD: EMI Classics; Cat: 0077776396750
1967	James McCracken, Pilar Lorengar, Robert Merrill	Lamberto Gardelli, Accademia Nazionale di Santa Cecilia orchestra and chorus	CD: Decca Records; Cat: 452 179-2
1969	Jon Vickers, Raina Kabaivanska, Peter Glossop	Herbert von Karajan, Teatro alla Scala orchestra and chorus	DVD: Deutsche Grammophon; Cat: 0734389
1976	Luciano Pavarotti, Mirella Freni, Ingvar Wixell	Giuseppe Patanè, National Philharmonic Orchestra and chorus	Audio CD: Decca Classics; Cat: 00289 414 5902
1979	José Carreras, Renata Scotto, Kari Nurmela	Riccardo Muti; Philharmonia Orchestra; Ambrosian Opera Chorus,	Audio CD: EMI Classics; Cat: 0777 7 63650 2 2; CDMB 63650; 7 63650 2
1981	Plácido Domingo, Teresa Stratas, Juan Pons	Georges Prêtre; Teatro alla Scala orchestra and chorus (Film - directed by Franco Zeffirelli)	Audio CD: Philips; Cat: 411484-2 /4542652, Audio CD: Decca; Cat: 894705702, DVD: Philips; Cat: 070 428-9, DVD: Deutsche Grammophon; Cat: 0044007 34033
2007	Andrea Bocelli, Ana María Martínez, Stefano Antonucci, Francesco Piccoli, Roberto Accurso	Steven Mercurio; Orchestra e Coro del Teatro Massimo Bellini di Carana; Coro di voci bianche "Gaudeamus igitur" Concentus	Audio CD: Sugar SRL; Cat: 39 02 77070 1
2020	Aldo Di Toro; Aurelia Florian; Audun Iversen	Oksana Lyniv; Graz Philharmonic Orchestra; Oper Graz Chorus	CD: Oehms Classics; Cat: OC 987

== Paired with Puccini's Il tabarro ==
Year	Cast (Canio, Nedda, Tonio)	Conductor, Opera House and Orchestra	Label
1994	Luciano Pavarotti, Teresa Stratas, Juan Pons	James Levine, Metropolitan Opera orchestra and chorus	DVD: Deutsche Grammophon; Cat: 00440 073 4024
