= La traviata discography =

The following is a partial discography of the many audio and video recordings of Giuseppe Verdi's opera, La traviata. Based on the 1848 novel La dame aux Camélias by Alexandre Dumas, fils, La traviata has been a staple of the operatic repertoire since its premiere on 6 March 1853 at the Teatro La Fenice in Venice.

== Audio recordings ==
All catalog numbers are for audio CDs unless otherwise noted.

Year	Cast: Violetta, Alfredo, Germont	Conductor, opera house and orchestra	Label
1912	Jane Morlet, Maurizio Troselli, Henri Albers	Emile Archainbaud, Opéra-Comique orchestra and chorus, Paris??	Marston; Cat: MR 52043
1915	Margherita Bevignani, Franco Tumminello, Ernesto Badini	Carlo Sabajno, La Scala orchestra and chorus, Milan	Mike Richter; Cat: Audio Encyclopedia 301
1928	Mercedes Capsir, Lionello Cecil, Carlo Galeffi	Lorenzo Molajoli, La Scala orchestra and chorus, Milan	Naxos Records; Cat: No. 8.110110-11
1930	Anna Rosza, Alessandro Ziliani, Luigi Borgonovi	Carlo Sabajno, La Scala orchestra and chorus, Milan	Opera d'Oro; Cat: OPD 9002
1935	Rosa Ponselle, Frederick Jagel, Lawrence Tibbett	Ettore Panizza, Metropolitan Opera orchestra and chorus (Recording of a performance at Met, 5 January 1935)	Naxos Historical; Cat: No. 8.110032-33; Met Opera on Demand
1946	Licia Albanese, Jan Peerce, Robert Merrill	Arturo Toscanini, NBC Symphony Orchestra	RCA Victor; Cat: LM-6003 (LP); Cat: 60303-2-RG (CD)
1946	Adriana Guerrini, Luigi Infantino, Paolo Silveri	Vincenzo Bellezza, Rome Opera orchestra and chorus	Grammofono 2000; Cat: AB 78700/01
1949	Eleanor Steber, Giuseppe Di Stefano, Robert Merrill	Giuseppe Antonicelli, Metropolitan Opera orchestra and chorus (Recording of a performance at Met, 1 January 1949)	Naxos Historical; Cat: No. 8.110115-16
1953	Maria Callas, Francesco Albanese, Ugo Savarese	Gabriele Santini, Italian Radio Symphony Orchestra Turin, Coro Cetra	Warner Classics; Cat: 698772; Andromeda; Cat: ANR 2504/05
1954	Renata Tebaldi, Gianni Poggi, Aldo Protti	Francesco Molinari-Pradelli, Orchestra dell'Accademia Nazionale di Santa Cecilia (Rome)	Decca, Disc 6 of Cat: 4781535
1955	Licia Albanese, Giacinto Prandelli, Ettore Bastianini	Alberto Erede, Metropolitan Opera orchestra and chorus (Recording of a performance at Met, 1 January 1955)	Walhall; Cat: WLCD0284
1955	Maria Callas, Giuseppe Di Stefano, Ettore Bastianini	Carlo Maria Giulini, La Scala orchestra and chorus, Milan (Recording of a performance at La Scala, 28 May 1955)	EMI Classics; Cat: 66450
1955	Antonietta Stella, Giuseppe Di Stefano, Tito Gobbi	Tullio Serafin, La Scala orchestra and chorus, Milan	Naxos Historical; Cat: 8.111272-3
1956	Rosanna Carteri, Cesare Valletti, Leonard Warren	Pierre Monteux, Rome Opera orchestra and chorus	RCA Victrola; Cat: VIC-6004 (LP); Cat: 88875051922 (CD)
1958	Maria Callas, Alfredo Kraus, Mario Sereni	Franco Ghione, San Carlos National Theatre orchestra and chorus, Lisbon (Recording of a performance in Lisbon, 27 March)	EMI Classics; Cat: 56330
1959	Victoria de los Ángeles, Carlo del Monte, Mario Sereni	Tullio Serafin, Rome Opera orchestra and chorus	Warner Classics; Cat:0724357382458
1960	Anna Moffo, Richard Tucker, Robert Merrill	Fernando Previtali, Rome Opera orchestra and chorus	RCA Victor; Cat: LSC-6154 (LP); Cat: 68885-2 (CD)
1962	Joan Sutherland, Carlo Bergonzi, Robert Merrill	John Pritchard, Maggio Musicale Fiorentino orchestra and chorus	Decca; Cat: 717302
1962	Renata Scotto, Gianni Raimondi, Ettore Bastianini	Antonino Votto, La Scala orchestra and chorus	Deutsche Grammophon; Cat: 894002
1967	Montserrat Caballé, Carlo Bergonzi, Sherrill Milnes	Georges Prêtre, RCA Italiana Opera orchestra and chorus	RCA Red Seal; Cat: LSC-6180 (LP); Cat: 88883727172 (CD)
1968	Virginia Zeani, Ion Buzea, Nicolae Herlea	Jean Bobescu; Romanian National Opera, Bucharest Orchestra and Chorus	World of the Opera; Cat: 5251
1968	Pilar Lorengar, Giacomo Aragall, Dietrich Fischer-Dieskau	Lorin Maazel, Orchester und Chor der Deutschen Oper Berlin	Decca; Cat: 443000
1971	Beverly Sills, Nicolai Gedda, Rolando Panerai	Aldo Ceccato, Royal Philharmonic Orchestra, John Alldis Choir	EMI Classics; Cat: 69827
1973	Mirella Freni, Franco Bonisolli, Sesto Bruscantini	Lamberto Gardelli, Chor Staatsoper Berin, Staatskapelle Berlin	ARTS; Cat: 43031-2
1976	Ileana Cotrubaș, Plácido Domingo, Sherrill Milnes	Carlos Kleiber; Bavarian State Opera orchestra and chorus	Deutsche Grammophon; Cat: 415132
1979	Joan Sutherland, Luciano Pavarotti, Matteo Manuguerra	Richard Bonynge, National Philharmonic Orchestra and London Opera Chorus	Decca; Cat: 430491
1980	Renata Scotto, Alfredo Kraus, Renato Bruson	Riccardo Muti, Philharmonia Orchestra and the Ambrosian Opera Chorus	EMI Classics; Cat: 47538
1991	Cheryl Studer, Luciano Pavarotti, Juan Pons	James Levine, Metropolitan Opera orchestra and chorus	Deutsche Grammophon; Cat: 435797
1992	Kiri Te Kanawa, Alfredo Kraus, Dmitri Hvorostovsky	Zubin Mehta, Maggio Musicale Fiorentino orchestra and chorus	Philips; Cat: 438238
1994	Angela Gheorghiu, Frank Lopardo, Leo Nucci	Georg Solti, Royal Opera House, Covent Garden orchestra and chorus	Decca; Cat: 448119
2004	Renée Fleming, Ramón Vargas, Dmitri Hvorostovsky	Valery Gergiev, Metropolitan Opera orchestra and chorus	Met Opera on Demand
2005	Anna Netrebko, Rolando Villazón, Thomas Hampson	Carlo Rizzi, Vienna Philharmonic and Vienna State Opera Chorus (Live recording)	Deutsche Grammophon; Cat: 52902
2012	Emma Matthews, Gianluca Terranova, Jonathan Summers	Brian Castles-Onion, Chorus and Orchestra of Opera Australia	EPC Distribution; Cat:OPOZ56031CD
2019	Marina Rebeka, Charles Castronovo, Lester Lynch	Michael Balke, Latvian Festival Orchestra	Prima Classic; Cat:PRIMA003

== Video recordings ==
Year	Cast: Violetta, Alfredo, Germont	Conductor, opera house and orchestra	Label
1968	Anna Moffo, Franco Bonisolli, Gino Bechi	Giuseppe Patanè, Rome Opera orchestra and chorus (Film directed by Mario Lanfranchi)	DVD: VAI
1976	Beverly Sills, Henry Price, Richard Fredricks	Julius Rudel, Filene Center Orchestra, Wolf Trap Company Chorus (Recorded live, Wolf Trap Farm)	DVD: VAI
1981	Ileana Cotrubas, Plácido Domingo, Cornell MacNeil	James Levine, Metropolitan Opera Orchestra and Chorus (Performance of 28 March)	Streaming video: Met Opera on Demand
1982	Teresa Stratas, Plácido Domingo, Cornell MacNeil	James Levine, Metropolitan Opera Orchestra and Chorus (La Traviata (1982 film) directed by Franco Zeffirelli)	DVD: Universal; DGG
1988	Marie McLaughlin, Walter MacNeil, Brent Ellis	Bernard Haitink, London Philharmonic Orchestra, Glyndebourne Festival Chorus (Performance in September)	DVD: Arthaus; Kultur
1994	Angela Gheorghiu, Frank Lopardo, Leo Nucci	Georg Solti, Royal Opera House orchestra and chorus (Performance in December)	DVD: Decca
2004	Patrizia Ciofi, Roberto Saccà, Dmitri Hvorostovsky	Lorin Maazel, Orchestra and chorus of La Fenice (Performance on 18 November)	DVD: TDK
2005	Norah Ansellem; José Bros; Renato Bruson	Jesús López Cobos, Madrid Symphony Orchestra and chorus (Performance from the Teatro Real, March)	DVD: Opus Arte
2005	Anna Netrebko, Rolando Villazón, Thomas Hampson	Carlo Rizzi, Vienna Philharmonic and Vienna State Opera Chorus (Performed in July at the Salzburg Festival; production: Willy Decker)	DVD, Blu-ray: DGG
2005	Eva Mei, Piotr Beczała, Thomas Hampson	Franz Welser-Möst, Chorus and Orchestra of the Zürich Opera House (Performance from Zürich Opera House)	DVD: Arthaus Musik
2006	Renée Fleming, Rolando Villazón, Renato Bruson	James Conlon, Orchestra and Chorus of the Los Angeles Opera (Performance in the Dorothy Chandler Pavilion on 17 September)	DVD: Decca
2007	Angela Gheorghiu, Ramón Vargas, Roberto Frontali	Lorin Maazel, Orchestra and Chorus of Teatro alla Scala (Performance from La Scala)	DVD: Arthaus Musik
2008	Kristiane Kaiser, Jean-François Borras, Georg Tichy	Ernst Märzendorfer, Slovak Philharmonic Orchestra and Chorus (Performance at the Römersteinbruch St. Margarethen, 11 July)	DVD: EuroArts
2009	Cinzia Forte; Saimir Pirgu; Giovanni Meoni	Paolo Arrivabeni, Opéra Royal de Wallonie Orchestra and Chorus (Performance in March)	DVD: Dynamic
2009	Renée Fleming, Joseph Calleja, Thomas Hampson	Antonio Pappano, Orchestra and Chorus of the Royal Opera (Performance from Covent Garden)	DVD: Arthaus Musik
2011	Natalie Dessay, Charles Castronovo, Ludovic Tezier	Louis Langrée, London Symphony Orchestra and Estonian Philharmonic Chamber Choir (Performance from Aix-en-Provence Festival, July)	DVD: Virgin Classics
2011	Marlis Petersen, Giuseppe Varano, James Rutherford	Tecwyn Evans, Graz Opera Chorus, Graz Philharmonic Orchestra (Performance at the Graz Opera)	DVD: Arthaus Musik
2012	Natalie Dessay, Matthew Polenzani, Dmitri Hvorostovsky	Fabio Luisi, Metropolitan Opera Orchestra and Chorus (Performance of 14 April; production: Willy Decker)	HD video: Met Opera on Demand
2017	Sonya Yoncheva, Michael Fabiano, Thomas Hampson	Nicola Luisotti, Metropolitan Opera Orchestra and Chorus (Performance of 11 March; production: Willy Decker)	HD video: Met Opera on Demand
2018	Diana Damrau, Juan Diego Flórez, Quinn Kelsey	Yannick Nézet-Séguin, Metropolitan Opera Orchestra and Chorus (Performance of 15 December; production: Michael Mayer)	HD video: Met Opera on Demand
2019	Ermonela Jaho, Charles Castronovo, Plácido Domingo	Antonello Manacorda, Orchestra and Chorus of the Royal Opera House Covent Garden (Richard Eyre, stage director)	Blu-ray: Opus Arte
2021	Lisette Oropesa, Samir Pirgu, Roberto Frontali	Daniele Gatti, Orchestra and Chorus of the Teatro dell'Opera di Roma (Mario Martone, director)	On demand: RAI Play
2022	Pretty Yende, Stephen Costello, Vladimir Stoyanov	Giacomo Sagripanti, Orchestra and Chorus of the Royal Opera House (Director: Richard Eyre; performance of 13 April)	HD video: Royal Opera House Stream
2022	Nadine Sierra, Stephen Costello, Luca Salsi	Daniele Callegari, Metropolitan Opera Orchestra and Chorus (Performance of 5 November; production: Michael Mayer)	HD video: Met Opera on Demand
