= Madama Butterfly discography =

This is a partial discography of Madama Butterfly (Madame Butterfly), an opera by Giacomo Puccini, first staged in Milan at La Scala on February 17, 1904.

== Audio recordings ==
Year	Cast (Cio-Cio San, Pinkerton, Suzuki, Sharpless)	Conductor, Opera house and orchestra	Label/Notes
1921	Ottavia Giordano, Santo Santonocito, Ginevra Amato, Adolfo Pacini	Carlo Sabajno; Teatro alla Scala orchestra and chorus	LP: Società Nazionale del Grammofono; Cat: S 5410-5434
1929	Rosetta Pampanini, Alessandro Granda, Conchita Velasquez, Gino Vanelli	Lorenzo Molajoli; Teatro alla Scala orchestra and chorus	LP: Columbia; Cat: D 14530-43; CD: Arkadia; Cat: 78041
1929-30	Margaret Burke Sheridan, Lionello Cecil, Ida Mannarini, Vittorio Weinberg	Carlo Sabajno; Teatro alla Scala orchestra and chorus	LP: La voce del padrone Cat: S 10190-205; CD: Romophone; Cat: 89001-2; Arkadia, Cat: 78030
1939	Toti Dal Monte, Beniamino Gigli, Vittoria Palombini, Mario Basiola	Oliviero De Fabritiis; Teatro Reale dell'Opera di Roma orchestra and chorus	LP: La voce del padrone DB 3859-3874; CD: EMI CHS; Cat: 7 69990-2
1948	Eleanor Steber, Jan Peerce, Suzanne Carré, Richard Bonelli	Eugene Ormandy; Hollywood Bowl Orchestra and chorus	CD: VAI; Cat: VAIA 1220
1949	Eleanor Steber, Richard Tucker, Jean Madeira, Giuseppe Valdengo	Max Rudolf; Metropolitan Opera orchestra and chorus	LP: Columbia Records; Cat: 13011D -13026D; CD: Sony; Cat: MH2K 62765
1951	Renata Tebaldi, Giuseppe Campora, Nell Rankin, Giovanni Inghilleri	Alberto Erede; Accademia Nazionale di Santa Cecilia orchestra and chorus	LP: Decca; Cat: LXT 2638-2640; CD: Naxos Historical; Cat: 8.110254-55
1953	Clara Petrella, Ferruccio Tagliavini, Mafalda Masini, Giuseppe Taddei	Angelo Questa; RAI National Symphony Orchestra and chorus	LP: Cetra; Cat: OLPC1248/1-3; CD: Warner-Fonit; Cat: 0927-43551-2
1954	Victoria de los Ángeles, Giuseppe Di Stefano, Anna Maria Canali, Tito Gobbi	Gianandrea Gavazzeni; Teatro Reale dell'Opera di Roma orchestra and chorus	LP: La voce del padrone cat: ALP 1215-1217; CD: Naxos Historical; Cat: 8.111291-92
1955	Maria Callas, Nicolai Gedda, Lucia Danieli, Mario Borriello	Herbert von Karajan; Teatro alla Scala orchestra and chorus	LP: Columbia; Cat: 33CX 1296-1298; CD: Naxos Historical; Cat: 8.111026-27
1956	Dorothy Kirsten, Daniele Barioni, Mildred Miller, Clifford Harvuot	Dimitri Mitropoulos; Metropolitan Opera orchestra and chorus	LP: Metropolitan Opera Record Club; Cat: MO 722; CD: Living Stage; Cat: LS 1038
1957	Anna Moffo, Cesare Valletti, Rosalind Elias, Renato Cesari	Erich Leinsdorf; Teatro Reale dell'Opera di Roma orchestra and chorus	LP: RCA Victrola; Cat: VICS 6100; CD: RCA Victor; Cat: 4145-2
1958	Renata Tebaldi, Carlo Bergonzi, Fiorenza Cossotto, Enzo Sordello	Tullio Serafin; Accademia Nazionale di Santa Cecilia orchestra and chorus	LP: Decca; Cat: LXT 5468-5470; CD: Decca; Cat: 470 577-2
1959	Victoria de los Ángeles, Jussi Björling, Miriam Pirazzini, Mario Sereni	Gabriele Santini; Teatro Reale dell'Opera di Roma orchestra and chorus	LP: La voce del padrone Cat: ALP 1795-1797; CD: EMI Classics; Cat: 414446-5 1962 Grammy Award for Best Opera Recording
1962	Leontyne Price, Richard Tucker, Rosalind Elias, Philip Maero	Erich Leinsdorf; RCA Italiana Orchestra and chorus	LP: RCA Victor; Cat: LSC 6160; CD: RCA Victor; Cat: 09026 68884-2 1964 Grammy Award for Best Opera Recording
1966	Renata Scotto, Carlo Bergonzi, Anna di Stasio, Rolando Panerai	John Barbirolli; Teatro Reale dell'Opera di Roma orchestra and chorus	LP: La voce del padrone Cat: SAN 184-186; CD: EMI Classics; Cat: 3.67720-2
1974	Mirella Freni, Luciano Pavarotti, Christa Ludwig, Robert Kerns	Herbert von Karajan; Vienna Philharmonic Orchestra; Vienna State Opera chorus	CD: Decca; Cat: 417 577-2
1976	Montserrat Caballé, Bernabé Martí, Silvana Mazzieri, Franco Bordoni	Armando Gatto; Gran Teatre del Liceu orchestra and chorus	LP: Decca; Cat: D68DR 3
1977	Renata Scotto, Plácido Domingo, Gillian Knight, Ingvar Wixell	Lorin Maazel; Philharmonia Orchestra; Ambrosian Opera Chorus	CD: Sony Classical; Cat: SM2K 91135
1987	Mirella Freni, José Carreras, Teresa Berganza, Juan Pons	Giuseppe Sinopoli; Philharmonia Orchestra; Ambrosian Opera Chorus	LP: Deutsche Grammophon; 423 567-1; CD: Deutsche Grammophon; Cat: 423 567-2
1991	Miriam Gauci, Yordy Ramiro, Nelly Boschkowá, Georg Tichy	Alexander Rahbari; Slovak Radio Symphony Orchestra; Slovak Philharmonic chorus	CD: Naxos; Cat: 8.660015-16
1997	Svetlana Katchour, Bruce Rankin, Fredrika Brillemburg, Heikki Kilpelainen	Günter Neuhold; Bremer Philharmoniker Staatsorchester; Bremer Theater chorus (Original 1904 version)	CD: Naxos; Cat: 8.660078-79
2008	Angela Gheorghiu, Jonas Kaufmann, Enkelejda Shkosa, Fabio Capitanucci	Antonio Pappano; Accademia Nazionale di Santa Cecilia orchestra and chorus	CD: EMI Classics; Cat: 2641872

== Video recordings ==
Year	Cast (Cio-Cio San, Pinkerton, Suzuki, Sharpless)	Conductor, Opera house and orchestra (Production details)	Label
1956	Anna Moffo, Renato Cioni, Miti Truccato Pace, Afro Poli	Oliviero De Fabritiis, RAI Milano orchestra and chorus	DVD: VAI; Cat: VAI 4284
1974	Mirella Freni, Plácido Domingo, Christa Ludwig, Robert Kerns	Herbert von Karajan, Vienna Philharmonic Orchestra, Vienna State Opera chorus (Film directed by Jean-Pierre Ponnelle)	Blu-ray/DVD: Deutsche Grammophon; Cat: 073 5131/073 4037
1986	Yasuko Hayashi, Peter Dvorský, Hak-Nam Kim, Giorgio Zancanaro	Lorin Maazel, Teatro alla Scala orchestra and chorus	DVD: Arthaus; Cat: 100 110
2004	Daniela Dessì, Fabio Armiliato, Rossana Rinaldi, Juan Pons	Plácido Domingo, Festival Puccini at Torre del Lago; Città Lirica orchestra and chorus	DVD/CD: Dynamic; Cat: 33457; Cat: CDS 599
2009	Patricia Racette, Marcello Giordani, Maria Zifchak, Dwayne Croft	Patrick Summers, Metropolitan Opera orchestra and chorus (Recorded live, 7 March 2009; production: Anthony Minghella)	Streaming HD video: Met Opera on Demand; DVD: Sony Classical; Cat: 88697-80662-9
2009	Raffaella Angeletti, Massimiliano Pisapia, Annunziata Vestri, Claudio Sgura	Daniele Callegari, Sferisterio Opera Festival (Recorded live, 24 July – 2 August 2009; stage director, set and costume designer: Pier Luigi Pizzi)	Blu ray/DVD: C Major
2012	Alexia Voulgaridou, Teodor Ilincai, Cristina Damian, Lauri Vasar	Alexander Joel, Hamburg Philharmonic, Hamburg State Opera Chorus (Recorded live, November 2012; stage director: Vincent Boussard)	Blu ray/DVD: ArtHaus Musik
2016	Maria José Siri, Bryan Hymel, Annalisa Stroppa, Carlos Álvarez	Riccardo Chailly, Teatro alla Scala orchestra and chorus (1904 version, recorded live, 2016)	Blu ray/DVD: Decca; Cat: 100 110
2017	Ermonela Jaho, Marcelo Puente, Elizabeth DeShong, Scott Hendricks	Antonio Pappano, Royal Opera House orchestra and chorus (Recorded live, 30 March 2017; stage directors: Moshe Leiser and Patrice Caurier)	Blu ray/DVD: Opus Arte
2018	Olga Busuioc, Joshua Guerrero, Elizabeth DeShong, Michael Sumuel	Omer Meir Wellber, London Philharmonic Orchestra, Glyndebourne Chorus (Recorded live, 21 June 2018, Glyndebourne Festival; designer: Nicky Shaw)	Blu ray/DVD: Opus Arte
2022	Maria Agresta, Joshua Guerrero, Christine Rice, Carlos Álvarez	Nicola Luisotti, Royal Opera House orchestra and chorus (Recorded live, 27 September 2022; stage directors: Moshe Leiser and Patrice Caurier)	HD video: ROH Stream
