= Adalgisa Giana =

Italian operatic soprano

Adalgisa Giana (June 27, 1888, in Lasnigo, Como Province – February 25, 1970 in Lasnigo) was an Italian operatic soprano.

Adalgisa Giana began her career in the United States, appearing in San Francisco in 1907 with the Milan Opera Company and in New Orleans in 1911 as a member of Lambardi Opera Company. From 1912 she managed her career in Italy, where she worked as a touring singer in minor opera houses, including the Teatro della Pergola in Florence and the Teatro Carcano in Milan. In 1918 Giana was engaged for the season at the Teatro Colón in Buenos Aires, where she sang a few roles, including Mallika in Leo Delibes's Lakmé, Principessa Elisa in Umberto Giordano's opera Madame Sans-Gêne and, notably, Musetta in Puccini's La bohème opposite Beniamino Gigli and Claudia Muzio under the direction of Tullio Serafin. She later returned to this theatre in 1926, performing several parts in contemporary operas, Zaubermädchen in Richard Wagner’s Parsifal and, notably, the Golden Cockerel in the local premiere of Nikolai Rimsky-Korsakov's opera of the same title (with Ninon Vallin as Tsaritsa of Shemakha). She probably finished her stage career in the early 1930s.

Adalgisa Giana was particularly associated with the role of Musetta in La bohème and notably sang this part in the first world complete recording of the opera (made in 1918 in Milan by La voce del padrone with Remo Andreini as Rodolfo and Gemma Bosini as Mimì, with the orchestra and chorus of the Teatro alla Scala under the direction of Carlo Sabajno). Giana's other roles on stage included Nedda in Ruggero Leoncavallo’s Pagliacci, Oscar in Giuseppe Verdi’s Un ballo in maschera and Walter in Alfredo Catalani's La Wally.
