= Olga Simzis =

Russian opera singer

Olga Simzis (1887, Odessa, Russian Empire – ?) was an operatic soprano who was active in the United States, Italy and Latin America from 1906 to 1941. She created the role of Ermyntrude in Pietro Mascagni's opera Isabeau in its world premiere conducted by the composer at the Teatro Coliseo in Buenos Aires in 1911. She also sang the role of Gilda in some scenes of one of the first complete recordings of Giuseppe Verdi's Rigoletto (made in 1916–1917 by La voce del padrone with the company of La Scala under the direction of Carlo Sabajno), where she substituted the first-cast soprano Ayres Borghi-Zerni.

Olga Simzis was born in Odessa in 1887. She made her debut in Parma in 1906 as Amina in Vincenzo Bellini's La sonnambula and sang as a member of the Lambardi Opera Company in the United States in 1907–1908. In 1909 she moved to Italy, where she kept on singing till 1920, appearing on a great number of small provincial stages and some important venues including the Teatro Regio in Parma (in 1909 as Waldvogel in Richard Wagner's Siegfried opposite Giuseppe Borgatti and as Anna in Alfredo Catalani's Loreley in 1910), the Teatro Carlo Felice in Genoa (in 1911 as Nedda in Ruggero Leoncavallo's Pagliacci opposite Carlo Galeffi), the Teatro La Fenice in Venice (in 1914–1915 as Norina in Gaetano Donizetti's Don Pasquale and Gilda in Giuseppe Verdi's Rigoletto) and the Teatro Massimo in Palermo (in 1918 as Elvira in Bellini's I puritani). In 1919 she was engaged for the role of Cio Cio San in Giacomo Puccini's Madama Butterfly at the Teatro Colón in Buenos Aires. There Simzis met the conductor Arturo de Angelis, with whom she subsequently married and emigrated to Santiago de Chile. After the marriage Simzis's career was relegated to appearances in different minor opera houses of Latin America, where she performed in a wide variety of operatic parts (including Iris in Pietro Mascagni's opera of the same title and Minnie in Puccini's La fanciulla del West). She probably left the stage in 1941. Her death is undocumented.
