= Bernardo de Muro =

Italian opera singer

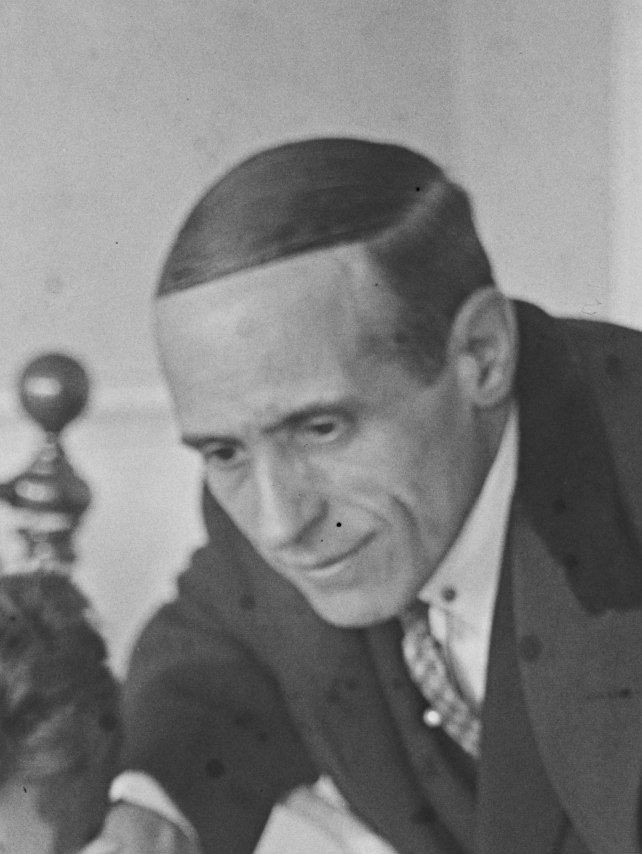
de Muro in 1925

Bernardo De Muro (November 3, 1881 – 27 October 1955) was a Sardinian operatic tenor.

== Biography ==
Bernardino de Muro was born on November 3, 1881, in Tempio Pausania, Sardinia, to Antonio Maria and Jeanne-Marie Demuro. His father was a small landowner. Bernardo's formal education ceased at primary school. Initially self-taught, he began singing in a café in Tempio. Moving to Rome, he participated in a competition for admission to the Conservatory of St. Cecilia in 1903. He studied under A. Sbriscia and Alfredo Martino. His operatic debut was on May 12, 1910, at the Teatro Costanzi in Rome, performing in Cavalleria rusticana by Mascagni. He received flattering reviews for this performance. In the next few years he performed in Madama Butterfly, L'Africaine, Carmen, and further performances of Cavalleria rusticana. Although he was long a star at La Scala, he was largely unknown to American audiences until he began to tour there. His continued career carried him to such places as the Solis in Montevideo, Uruguay in 1916, the Dal Verme in Milan (performing Mefistofele), the Hippodrome, St. Petersburg, Florida, in 1927, and The Dell Oferice Grand Opera Company of New York (performing Aida).

In 1942 he was committed to the Philadelphia La Scala Opera Company where he portrayed Manrico in Il trovatore at the Academy of Music.

== Later years ==
By 1935 De Muro was forced to cancel performances due to ill health. He became a successful businessman with a large cork factory in Milan. In his later years he taught voice in New York City, Sturgis, Michigan, and Rome. He died in Rome in 1955. Recognized as Tempio's most famous son, his body was brought back to the place of his birth, and he was buried under a pyramid of his own design.

== Singing style ==
His singing was reported to be resonant and clear with a robust tone, but pinched in the head-notes.

== Partial discography ==
- Aida
  - Pur ti riveggo (His Master's Voice DA171; Victor 949) – recorded May 22, 1922
- Andrea Chénier
  - Si fui soldato (His Master's Voice DB 553; Victor 6387) – recorded March 1, 1912
  - Un di all'azzurro spazio "Improvviso" (His Master's Voice DB 553; Victor 74376; Victor 6380) – recorded March 1, 1912
- Carmen
  - Ho nome Escamillo (with Roberto Janni) (His Master's Voice DB 554; Victor 6385) – recorded March 30, 1914
  - Il fior che avevi a me tu dato (His Master's Voice DB 549) – recorded March 13, 1912
  - Il fior che avevi a me tu dato (His Master's Voice 2-052173; Victor 6385) – recorded May 19, 1917
- La fanciulla del West
  - Ch'ella mi creda libero (His Master's Voice DA171; Victor 949) – recorded May 17, 1920
  - Sono Ramerrez (His Master's Voice DB 372; Victor 6422) – recorded November 4, 1921
- Isabeau
  - Dormivi? Sognavo (with Valentina Bartolomasi) (His Master's Voice DB 556; Victor 6387) – recorded March 8, 1912
  - E passerà la viva creatura (Victor 6379) – recorded March 7, 1912
  - Fu vile l'editto (His Master's Voice DB 558; Victor 6387) – recorded March 7, 1912
  - I tuoi occhi (with Valentina Bartolomasi) (His Master's Voice DB 556) – recorded March 8, 1912
  - Tu ch'odio lo mio grido (La canzone del falco) (His Master's Voice DB 557; Victor 6379) – recorded March 7, 1912
- Otello
  - Dio! mi potevi scagliar (Victor 6386) – recorded March 30, 1914
  - Esultate! L'orgoglie musulmano sepulto (His Master's Voice DB 559)
  - Niun mi tema (La morte di Otello) (His Master's Voice DB 560; Victor 6386) – recorded March 30, 1914
  - Ora e per pempre addio sante memorie (His Master's Voice DB 559)
- Il trovatore
  - Deserto sulla terra (with Ernesto Badini) (Victor 6410)
  - E deggio, e posso (with Ernesto Badini) (Victor 6410)
  - Miserer ... Quel suon, quelle preci ... Ah, che la morte ognora (with Maria Roggero) (His Master's Voice DB 644; Victor 6412) – recorded April 28, 1917

== Legacy ==
The Bernardo De Muro Musical Academy, founded in 2010, is located in Tempio Pausania, Sardinia.

The Bernardo De Muro Museum is housed within the Palazzo degli Scolopi, also located in Tempio Pausania, Sardinia.
