= Malvina Pereira =

- Born: 1883; Florianópolis
- Died: Unknown
- Occupation: Brazilian soprano

Malvina Pereira (1883, Florianópolis) was a Brazilian soprano. She is thought to be one of the first opera singers from Brazil to have had an international career. The first being the 18th century soprano Joaquina Lapinha.

== Biography ==
Malvina Pereira was born in Florianópolis in 1883 and probably studied singing in Italy with maestro Bellucci. She must have made her debut in 1901 at the Teatro Odeon in Mendoza and kept appearing in various small opera houses of Latin America till 1910. Her Italian debut happened in 1911 at the Teatro Morlacchi in Perugia, where she performed Violetta in Giuseppe Verdi's La traviata. From that point Pereira's career was almost entirely based in Italy, where she was enormously successful in small provincial theatres but almost never appeared on any important stages. Probably the greatest achievement Pereira made in Italy was in 1917, when she sang in Gaetano Donizetti's Lucia di Lammermoor at the Teatro Carcano in Milan. She is also known to have appeared at the Teatro Bellini di Napoli (as Violetta, Mimì in Giacomo Puccini's La bohème and Elvira in Vincenzo Bellini's I puritani) and the Teatro Filarmonico in Verona (as Violetta). Apart from Italy, Pereira toured Spain, where in 1914 she sang Rosina in Gioacchino Rossini's Il barbiere di Siviglia, Violetta and Gilda in Verdi's Rigoletto at the Teatro Arriaga in Bilbao, and the United States, where she performed at the Tivoli Theatre in San Francisco as a member of Lambardi Pacific Coast Company. Pereira apparently left the stage in 1920 and subsequently fell into obscurity.

== Discography ==
Pereira must have had a beautifully-timbered coloratura soprano with a perfect technique, as La Prensa wrote about her in 1912: No one can resist the fascination of Mme. Pereira's voice after a few minutes of her singing. What wins the public above all is the sweetness and sympathetic quality of her voice and the perfection of her phrasing. This probably explains the fact that Pereira made quite a few recordings for His Master's Voice, Odeon Records and Victor Talking Machine Company, amongst which are several duets from La traviata and Carlos Gomes Il Guarany with the famous tenor Giovanni Zenatello. Moreover, Pereira participated in one of the earliest complete recordings of Gioacchino Rossini's Il barbiere di Siviglia with Ernesto Badini and Edoardo Taliani as partners, made by His Master's Voice in 1919 in Milan with the orchestra and chorus of La Scala under the direction of Carlo Sabajno, where she sang the role of Rosina.

Title	Role	Cast	Company	Reference
Lucia di Lammermoor: Splendon le sacri faci	Lucia	-	La voce del padrone	053314
Rigoletto: È il sol dell'anima	Gilda	Franco de Gregorio (Il Duca)	La voce del padrone	54481
Rigoletto: Deh! Non parlare al misero	Gilda	Giuseppe Maggi (Rigoletto)	La voce del padrone	54482
Lucia di Lammermoor: Soffriva nel pianto	Lucia	Giuseppe Maggi (Enrico)	La voce del padrone	054422
Rigoletto: Bella figlia dell'amore	Gilda	Franco de Gregorio (Il Duca), Ida Zizolfi (Maddalena), Giuseppe Maggi (Rigoletto)	La voce del padrone	054439
Lucia di Lammermoor: Verranno a te sull'aura	Lucia	Salvatore Salvati (Edgardo)	La voce del padrone	054440
Lucia di Lammermoor: Maledizione	Lucia	Franco de Gregorio (Edgardo), Giuseppe Maggi (Enrico), Vincenzo Bettoni (Raimondo)	La voce del padrone	054442
Il Guarany: Perchè di meste lagrime	Cecilia	Giovanni Zenatello (Dom Antonio)	Odeon Records	40108
La traviata: Parigi, o cara	Violetta	Giovanni Zenatello (Alfredo)	Odeon Records	40122
Il Guarany: Gentile di cuore	Cecilia	-	Odeon Records	40777
Salvator Rosa: Mia piccirella	-	-	Odeon Records	40778
Il Guarany: Sento una forza indomita	Cecilia	Giovanni Zenatello (Dom Antonio)	Odeon Records	70007
Il barbiere di Siviglia (complete edition)	Rosina	Ernesto Badini (Figaro), Edoardo Taliani (Il Conte Almaviva), Abele Carnevali (Dottor Bartolo), Umberto di Lelio (Don Basilio), Agnese Mometti (Berta), Francesco Festa (Fiorello/Un Ufficiale)	La voce del padrone	S 5110, S 5112, S 5114, S 5116, S 5118, S 5120, S 5122, S 5124, S 5126, S 5128, S 5130, S 5132, S 5134, S 5136, S 5138 {15x12in-78s}, R 5115, R 5125
