= Carlo Sabajno =

Italian conductor

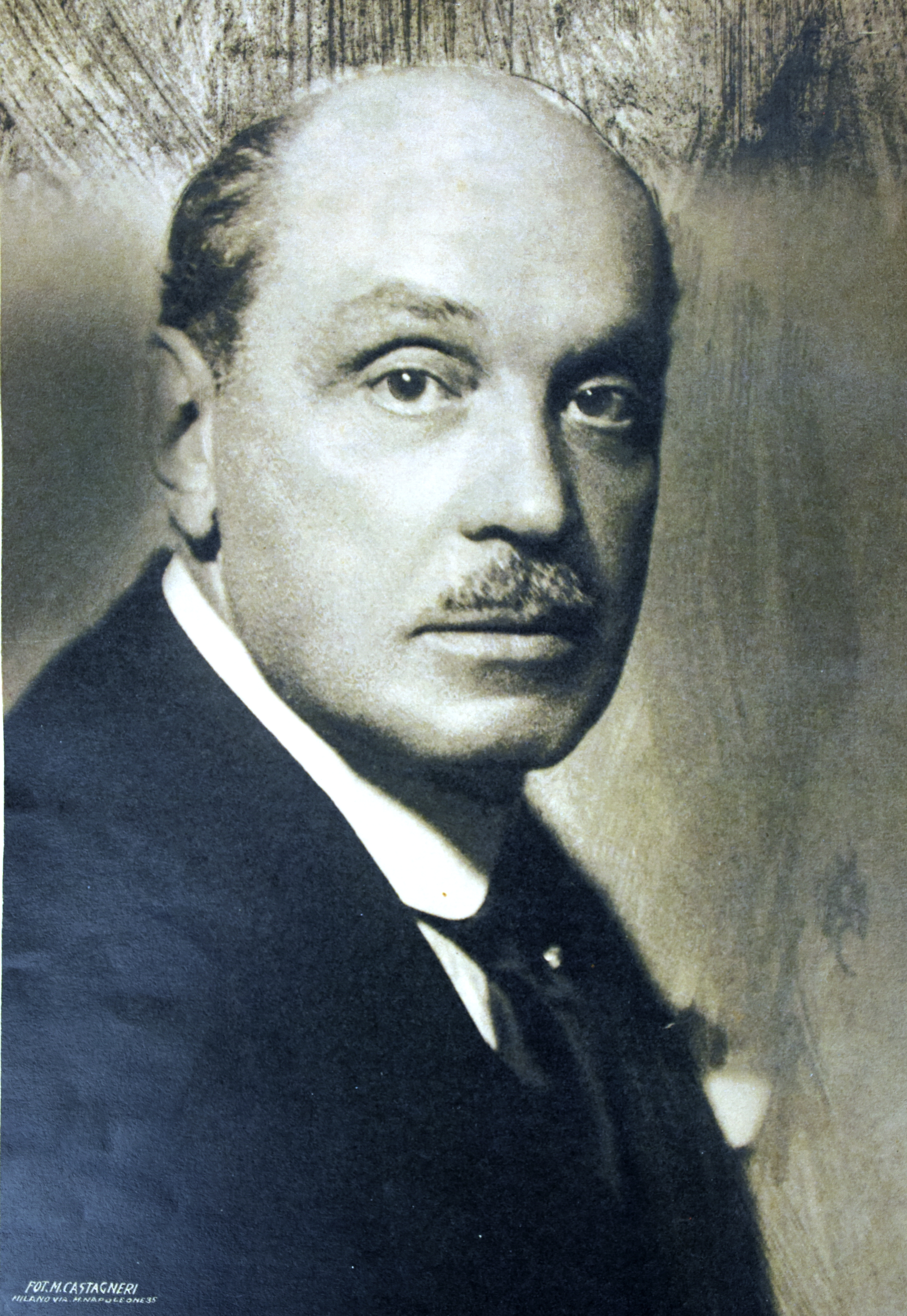
Carlo Sabajno

Carlo Sabajno (1874 in Rosasco, Italy – 1938 in Milan) was an Italian conductor. From 1904 to 1932, he was the Gramophone Company's chief conductor and artistic director in Italy, responsible for some of the earliest full-length opera recordings, most of them with the orchestra of La Scala, Milan and prominent singers there. Particularly outstanding among these are his stately, authoritative late-1920s and early-1930s electrical recordings of Don Pasquale (with Tito Schipa in his only complete opera recording as Ernesto), Traviata (sadly limited by more than the usual cuts, but with silvery-voiced Alessandro Ziliani as Alfredo), Aida (with Irene Minghini-Cattaneo's Amneris and Aureliano Pertile's Radamès), Otello (with Apollo Granforte as a formidable Iago) and Bohème (a superb understated, but highly distinguished, collaboration with excellent, if lesser-known, singers).

== Discography ==
1907

- 1907 Leoncavallo: Pagliacci – Antonio Paoli, Giuseppina Huguet, Ernesto Badini; Orchestra and Chorus of La Scala, Milan
- 1907 Verdi: Aida - Teresa Chelotti, Orazio Cosentino, Vittoria Colombati, Giovanni Novelli, Alfredo Brondi; Orchestra and Chorus of La Scala, Milan

1915 - 1919

- 1915 Mascagni: Cavalleria rusticana – Giorgina Ermolli, Franco Tuminello, Eugenio Perna; Orchestra and Chorus of La Scala, Milan
- 1915 Verdi: La traviata – Margherita Bevignani, Franco Tuminello, Ernesto Badini; Orchestra and Chorus of La Scala, Milan
- 1916-17 Verdi: Rigoletto – Giuseppe Danise, Ayres Borghi-Zerni, Carlo Broccardi, Ernesto Badini, Olga Simzis; Orchestra and Chorus of La Scala, Milan
- 1917 Leoncavallo: Pagliacci – Luigi Bolis, Anita Conti, Giuseppe Montanelli; Orchestra and Chorus of La Scala, Milan
- 1917 Puccini: La bohème – Gemma Bosini, Reno Andreini, Ernesto Badini, Adalgisa Giana; Orchestra and Chorus of La Scala, Milan
- 1918-19 Puccini: Tosca – Lya Remondini, Carlo Broccardi, Dario Zani; Grande Orchestra and Chorus
- 1919 Puccini: Tosca – Valentina Bartolomasi, Attilio Salvaneschi, Adolfo Pacini; Orchestra and Chorus of La Scala, Milan
- 1919 Rossini: Il barbiere di Siviglia – Ernesto Badini, Malvina Pereira, Edoardo Taliani; Orchestra and Chorus of La Scala, Milan
- 1919 Verdi: Aida – Valentina Bartolomasi, Enrico Trentini, Rosita Pagani, Adolfo Pacini, Guido Fernandez; Orchestra and Chorus of La Scala, Milan
- 1920 Giordano: Andrea Chénier – Luigi Lupato, Valentina Bartolomasi, Adolfo Pacini; Orchestra and Chorus of La Scala, Milan

1920 - 1930

- 1920 Bizet: Carmen - Fanny Anitùa, Luigi Bolis, Ines Maria Ferraris, Cesare Formichi; Orchestra and Chorus of La Scala, Milan
- 1920 Gounoud: Faust – Giuliano Romagnoli, Fernando Autori, Gemma Bosini, Adolfo Pacini, Gilda Timitz; Orchestra and Chorus of La Scala, Milan
- 1921 Puccini: Madama Butterfly – Ottavia Giordano, Santo Santonocito, Ginevra Amato, Adolfo Pacini; Orchestra and Chorus of La Scala, Milan
- 1927-1928 Verdi: Rigoletto – Luigi Piazza, Lina Pagliughi, Tino Folgar; Orchestra and Chorus of La Scala, Milan
- 1928 Puccini: La bohème – Rosina Torri, Aristodemo Giorgini, Ernesto Badini, Thea Vitulli; Orchestra and Chorus of La Scala, Milan;
- 1928 Verdi: Aida – Dusolina Giannini, Aureliano Pertile, Irene Minghini-Cattaneo, Giovanni Inghilleri, Luigi Manfrini; Orchestra and Chorus of La Scala, Milan
- 1929 Verdi: Requiem - Maria Luisa Fanelli, Irene Minghini-Cattaneo, Franco Lo Giudice, Ezio Pinza; Orchestra and Chorus of La Scala, Milan
- 1929 Leoncavallo: Pagliacci – Alessandro Valente, Adelaide Saraceni, Apollo Granforte; Orchestra and Chorus of La Scala, Milan
- 1929-30 Mascagni: Cavalleria rusticana – Delia Sanzio, Giovanni Breviario, Piero Biasini; Orchestra and Chorus of La Scala, Milan
- 1929-30 Puccini: Madama Butterfly – Margaret Burke Sheridan, Lionello Cecil, Ida Mannarini, Vittorio Weinberg; Orchestra and Chorus of La Scala, Milan
- 1929-30 Puccini: Tosca – Carmen Melis, Piero Pauli, Apollo Granforte; Orchestra and Chorus of La Scala, Milan

1930 - 1932

- 1930 Verdi: Il trovatore: – Aureliano Pertile, Maria Carena, Irene Minghini-Cattaneo, Apollo Granforte; Orchestra and Chorus of La Scala, Milan
- 1930-31 Verdi: La traviata – Anna Rosza, Alessandro Ziliani, Luigi Borgonovo; Orchestra and Chorus of La Scala, Milan
- 1931 Bizet: Carmen – Gabriella Besanzoni, Piero Pauli, Maria Carbone, Ernesto Besanzoni; Orchestra and Chorus of La Scala, Milan
- 1931-32 Verdi: Otello – Nicola Fusati, Maria Carbone, Apollo Granforte; Orchestra and Chorus of La Scala, Milan
- 1932 Donizetti: Don Pasquale – Ernesto Badini, Tito Schipa, Adelaide Saraceni, Afro Poli; Orchestra and Chorus of La Scala, Milan

== Sources ==
- Centre for the History and Analysis of Recorded Music, "The House Conductor: Carlo Sabajno". Accessed 26 February 2009.
- Gaisberg, Frederick William, Music on Record, 3rd Edition, Hale, 1948, p. 158.
- Garbutt, Tony, "Letters: Gramophone conductors", Gramophone, May 1990, p. 5
