= Nelda =

Nelda is a given name. Notable people with the name include:

- Nelda Garrone (c. 1880–?), Italian mezzo-soprano
- Nelda Martinez (born 1961), American real estate agent and politician
- Nelda Speaks (born c. 1943), American politician

== See also ==
- Zelda (given name)
