= Margherita Bevignani =

Italian operatic singer

- Margherita Bevignani
- Born: 1887
- Died: March 1921; Milan
- Occupation: Italian operatic soprano

Margherita Bevignani (1887, (?) – March 1921, Milan) was an Italian operatic soprano, best known for being the first singer to record the entire role of Violetta in Giuseppe Verdi's opera La traviata in 1915.

== Biography ==
Information is lacking concerning Bevignani's place of birth and her early years. She was apparently born in 1887 and studied singing with a certain teacher Perilli. She made her debut in 1909 at Politeama Garibaldi in Treviso as Micaela in Bizet's Carmen. Subsequently, she was invited to many Italian provincial stages, such as the Teatro Petruzzelli in Bari and the Teatro Massimo Bellini in Catania. In 1910 she made several guest appearances in a number of opera houses of Latin America, including the Theatro Municipal in Rio de Janeiro, where she sang Musetta in Puccini's La bohème and Gilda in Rigoletto. In 1911 she performed the role of Marguerite de Valois in Giacomo Meyerbeer's Les Huguenots at the Teatro Donizetti in Bergamo under the direction of Gino Marinuzzi. In 1912 Bevignani arrived in Milan, where she sang Amina in Bellini's La sonnambula at the Teatro dal Verme, though never appeared at La Scala. In the same year she toured London, where, despite never managing to sing at The Royal Opera House, she performed Nedda in Leoncavallo's Pagliacci at the Coliseum Theatre. In 1914-1916 Bevignani was invited to the Netherlands, where she was particularly praised for her Violetta in La traviata as well as Norina in Gaetano Donizetti's Don Pasquale. Italy's entrance into the First World War forced the singer's stay in the Netherlands, where she gave successful performances as Violetta, Gilda, Rosina in Rossini's Il barbiere di Siviglia and Lucia di Lammermoor in Donizetti's opera of the same title. After returning to Italy in 1918, Bevignani was struck by a fierce attack of pulmonary tuberculosis which put an end to her career. Her last performance was La traviata at the Royal Theatre Carré in Amsterdam where she sang Violetta. Margherita Bevignani died in Milan in March 1921, being only 34 years old.

== Discography ==
Even though Margherita Bevignani did not achieve any worldwide recognition and virtually never managed to sing at any of the world's principal opera houses, the name of this singer is significant. She sang Violetta in the first complete Italian recording of La traviata in 1915 with Franco Tumminello and Ernesto Badini as partners, made by La voce del padrone in Milan with the forces of La Scala under the direction of Carlo Sabajno. It shows Bevignani as a coloratura soprano. In addition, Bevignani can be heard on a number of separate recordings made for the Favorite company, including extended excerpts from Gounod's Faust, arias and duets by Verdi, Bellini, Donizetti, Rossini, Wagner and Massenet.
