= Casa di Riposo per Musicisti =

Home in Milan, Italy

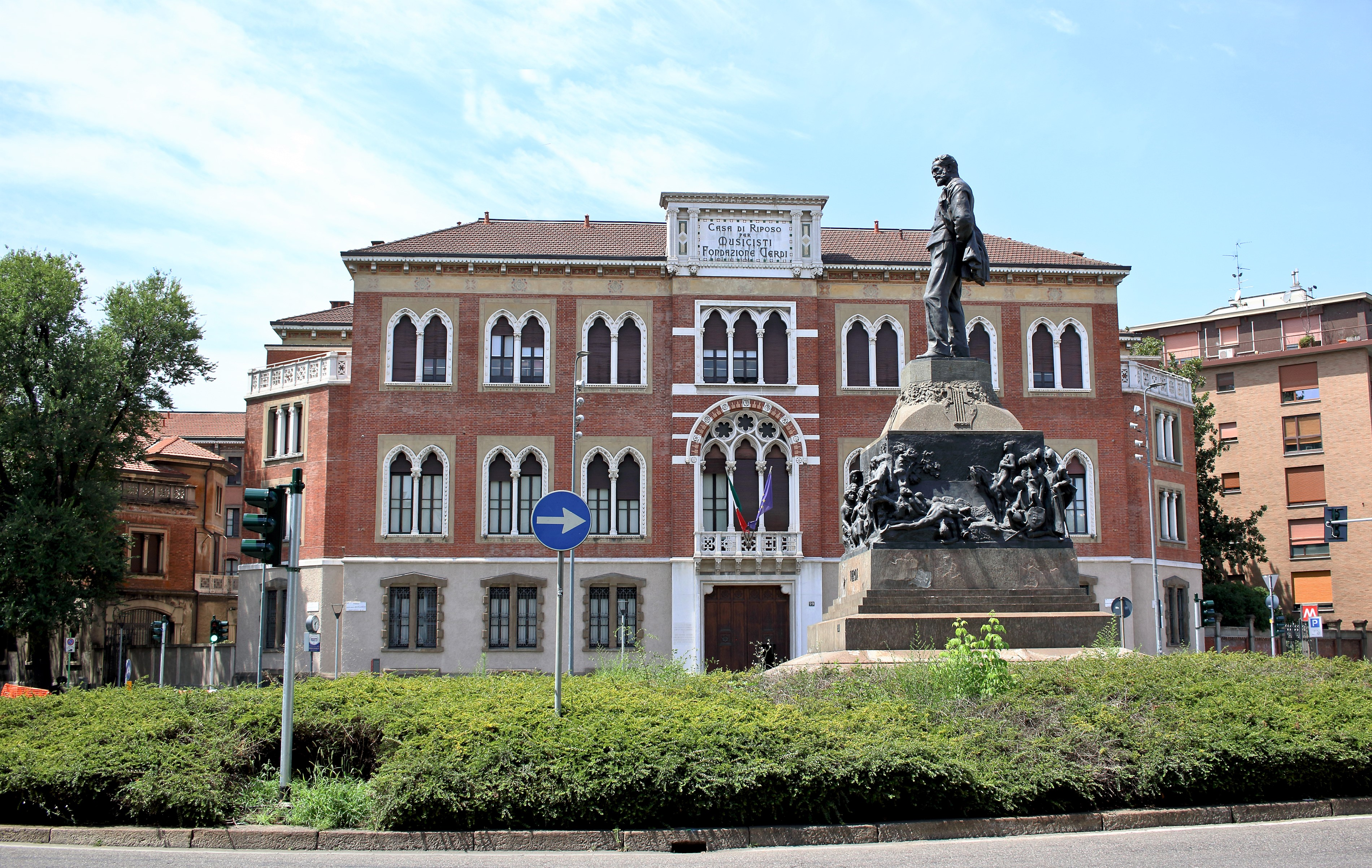
- The Casa di Riposo per Musicisti, Milan

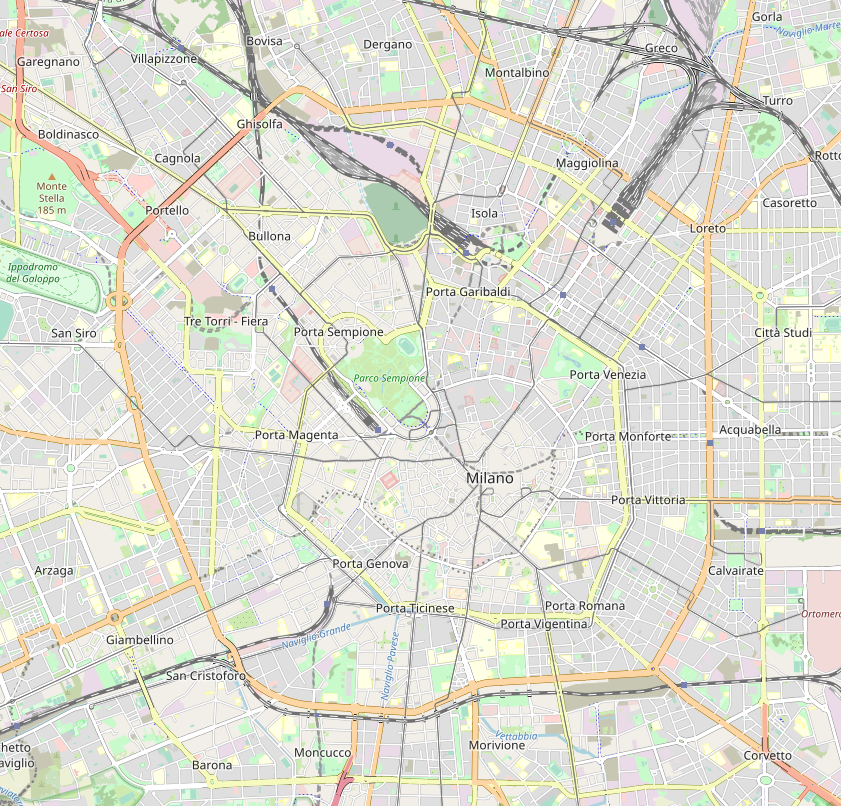
- Location within Milan Location within Italy

General information
- Architectural style: neo-Gothic style
- Location: Piazza Michelangelo Buonarroti, 29, 20145 Milano MI, Italy, Milan, Italy
- Coordinates: 45.4704°N 9.1548°E
- Completed: 1896

Design and construction
- Architect: Camillo Boito

The Casa di Riposo per Musicisti (literally 'rest home for musicians'), also known as Casa Verdi, is a home for retired opera singers and musicians in Milan, northern Italy, founded by the Italian composer Giuseppe Verdi (whose statue is in the piazza outside the building) in 1896. The building was designed in the neo-Gothic style by Italian architect, Camillo Boito. Both Verdi and his wife, Giuseppina Strepponi are buried there. A documentary film about life in the Casa di Riposo, Il Bacio di Tosca (Tosca's Kiss in the US), was made in 1984 by the Swiss director Daniel Schmid. A similar-themed documentary film, Viva Verdi!, was made in 2024 by the American director Yvonne Russo.

== History ==
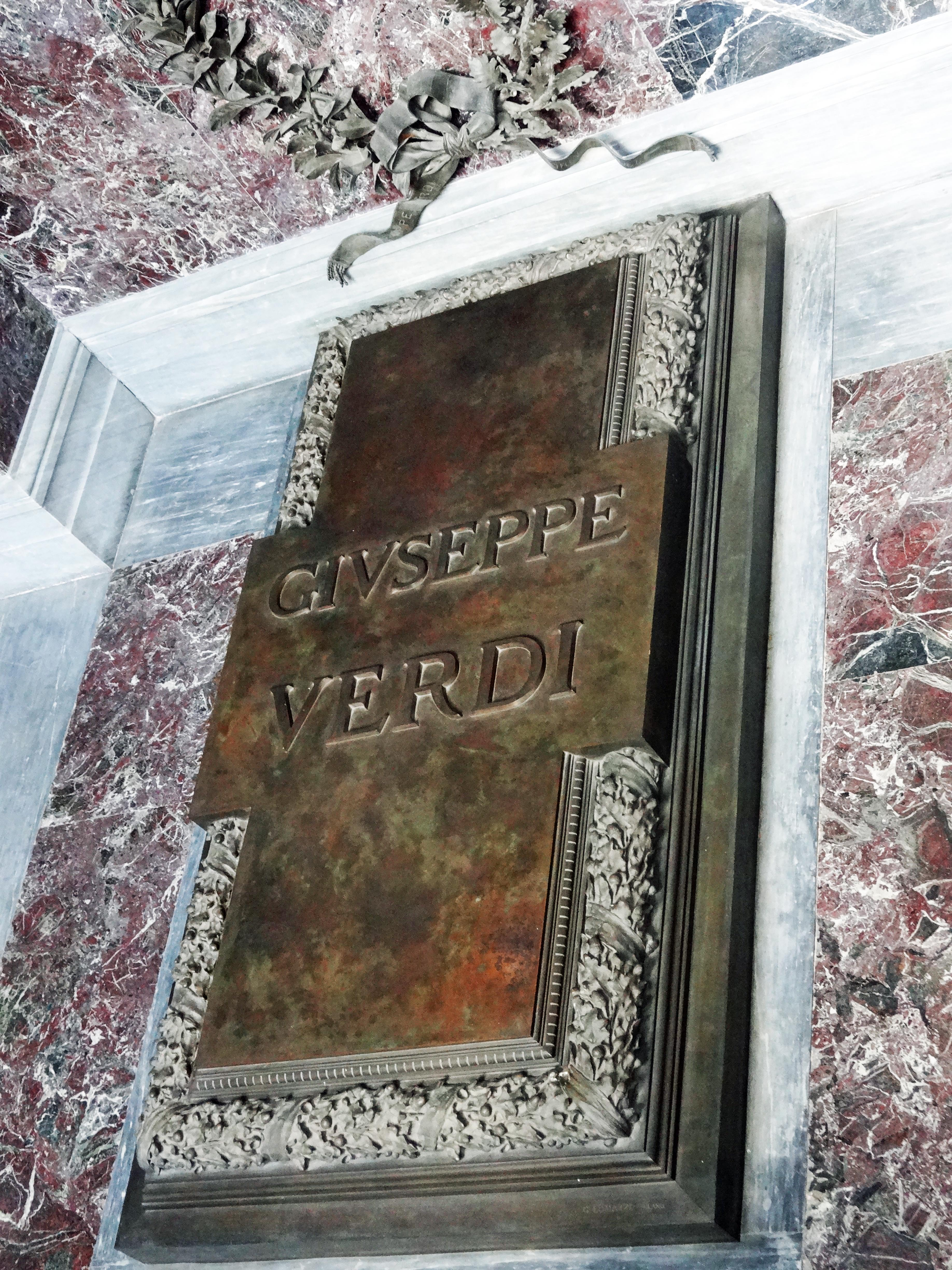
Verdi's grave at Casa di Riposo, Milan

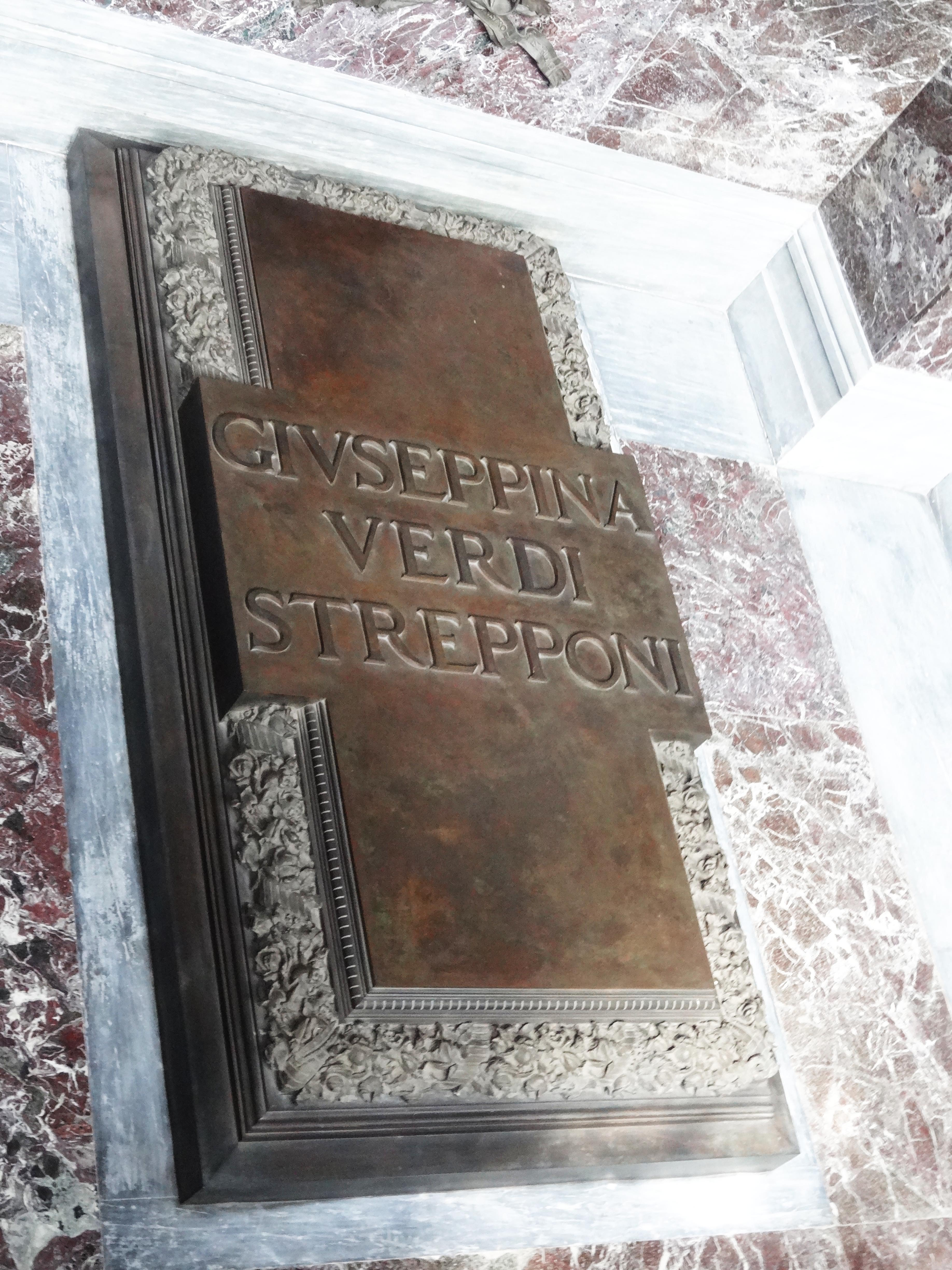
Grave of Giuseppina Strepponi at Casa di Riposo, Milan

In the last years of his life, Verdi wrote to his friend Giulio Monteverde:

Of all my works, that which pleases me the most is the Casa that I had built in Milan to shelter elderly singers who have not been favoured by fortune, or who when they were young did not have the virtue of saving their money. Poor and dear companions of my life!"

In 1888, Verdi had already built, equipped and managed a hospital in Villanova sull'Arda, a town bordering the fields of his estate. The following year, he turned to his next philanthropic project, a home for retired opera singers and musicians who had fallen on hard times. In 1889, he wrote to Giulio Ricordi that he had acquired a large piece of empty land in Milan outside the Porta Garibaldi on which he planned to build his Casa di Riposo. He then announced his plans publicly in an 1891 interview in the Gazetta musicale di Milano. Construction did not begin until 1896, but in the intervening years Verdi and wife, Giuseppina Strepponi, met frequently with the architect, Camillo Boito to plan the project. (Camillo Boito was the brother of Verdi's friend and librettist, Arrigo Boito.) He also sought out information on how other hospices for the elderly were run. In 1895, Verdi made provisions in his will to fund the Casa after his death, bequeathing the future royalties from his operas to the Casa di Riposo per Musicisti - Fondazione Giuseppe Verdi. Construction was completed in 1899, but Verdi did not want any residents to move in until after his death.

== Notable residents ==
- Gemma Bosini
- Carlo Broccardi
- Giuseppe Costa
- Gilda Dalla Rizza
- Angelo Lo Forese
- Sara Scuderi
- Mariano Stabile
