= Raffaele Arié =

Bulgarian bass

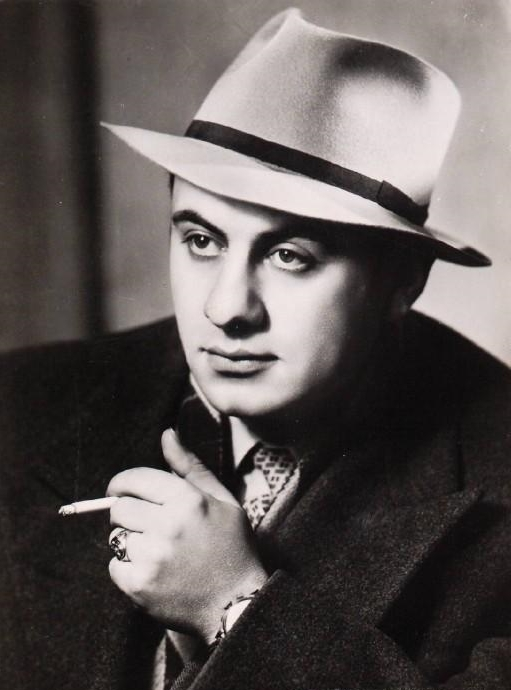
Raffaele Arié, in 1955

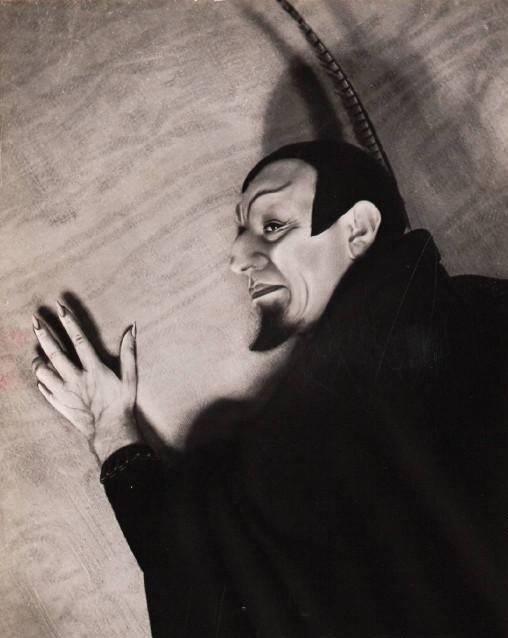
Raffaele Arié in Faust

Raffaele Arié (22 August 1920 – 17 March 1988) was a Bulgarian bass, particularly associated with the Italian and Russian repertories who was born in Sofia and died in Switzerland.

== Education ==
Arié studied first in his native city with C. Brambaroff, making his stage debut at the Sofia Opera in 1945. He then left for Italy to further his studies, and was a pupil of Riccardo Stracciari, Apollo Granforte and Carlo Tagliabue.

Raffaele Ariè in Boris Godunov (photo with dedication from 1956)

== Career ==
The bass made his debut at La Scala in 1947, as the King of Clubs in The Love for Three Oranges, directed by Giorgio Strehler. He continued to appear at that theatre until 1973, in Boris Godunov (as Varlaam), Prince Igor, The Rake's Progress (as Trulove, which he also sang in the world premiere at the Teatro La Fenice, opposite Dame Elisabeth Schwarzkopf, 1951), two works of Ildebrando Pizzetti, Eugene Onegin (as Prince Gremin, with Ettore Bastianini, Renata Tebaldi, and Giuseppe di Stefano), Guillaume Tell (as Walter Furst), Aida (as Ramfis, directed by Franco Zeffirelli), Faust (with Mirella Freni), Nabucco (opposite Elena Souliotis), Rigoletto (as Sparafucile, with Piero Cappuccilli, staged by Margherita Wallmann), Maria Stuarda (with Montserrat Caballé and Shirley Verrett), Linda di Chamounix (with Alfredo Kraus and Renato Bruson), and a concert of Shostakovich's Symphony No. 14 (with Ghena Dimitrova, at the Piccola Scala).

He also appeared at the Vienna State Opera, the Salzburg Festival, the Paris Opéra, and the Aix-en-Provence Festival.

While the basso never appeared with the Metropolitan Opera, he sang with the New York City Opera, in 1950 and 1951, in Turandot, Faust, La bohème, Don Giovanni (as Leporello), Aida (as Ramfis, opposite Herva Nelli), and Manon (as the Comte des Grieux).

== Recordings ==
In 1953, he portrayed Raimondo Bidebent in Lucia di Lammermoor in Florence, opposite Maria Callas, Giacomo Lauri Volpi, and Bastianini, conducted by Franco Ghione. During the production, Arié participated in a recording of the same opera for EMI, with Callas, di Stefano, and Tito Gobbi, conducted by Tullio Serafin. Also available from EMI, on DVD, is Arié's 1964 performance of the Verdi Requiem, conducted by Carlo Maria Giulini.

== Sources ==
- Grove Music Online, Noël Goodwin, Oxford University Press, 2008.
