= Attilio Salvaneschi =

Italian opera singer

Attilio Salvaneschi (1873–1938) was an Italian operatic tenor. He had an active international singing career from the late 1890s until his retirement in 1924. He then embarked on a second career as a voice teacher, first in Italy and later in the Netherlands. Possessing a voice of remarkable beauty, he made recordings for Blue Amberol Records, His Master's Voice, and Odeon Records.

== Career ==
After singing with mostly minor Italian opera houses for some years, Salvaneschi toured North America in performances with Mario Lombardi's opera troupe in 1907. He was also heard that year in operas in Havana. He made appearances at the New German Theatre in Prague in 1908, 1910, and 1914. Also in 1914, he performed as a guest artist at the Odessa Opera, the Royal Swedish Opera, and the Teatro Corso in Bologna.

For the 1914-1915 season, Salvaneschi was engaged at the Italian Opera in the Netherlands. He returned briefly to Italy in early 1915 to portray the Duke of Mantua in Giuseppe Verdi's Rigoletto at La Fenice with Mario Sammarco in the title role. Due to the difficulties in Italy during World War I, he decided to return to the Netherlands; working as a member of the Theatre Royal in The Hague from 1915-1919. He returned to Italy in 1919, and arrived at La Scala the following year. With the La Scala orchestra and chorus he notably recorded the role of Cavardossi in Giacomo Puccini's Tosca in 1920 with Carlo Sabajno conducting and Valentina Bartolomasi as the title heroine.

In 1921 Salvaneschi found great success in a series of performances of the Duke of Mantua at a variety of theatres, including the Teatro Adriano in Rome and the rebuilt Teatro Verdi di Padova (with Toti dal Monte and Mattia Battistini). In 1924 he retired from the stage after an unsuccessful throat operation. He spent the next four years teaching singing in Italy, and then moved in 1928 to The Hague where he continued to teach voice.
