= Mafalda Favero =

Italian operatic soprano

Mafalda Favero in the early 1940s (photo with 1944 dedication)

Mafalda Favero in the early 1940s (photo with 1944 dedication). Barindelli Collection.

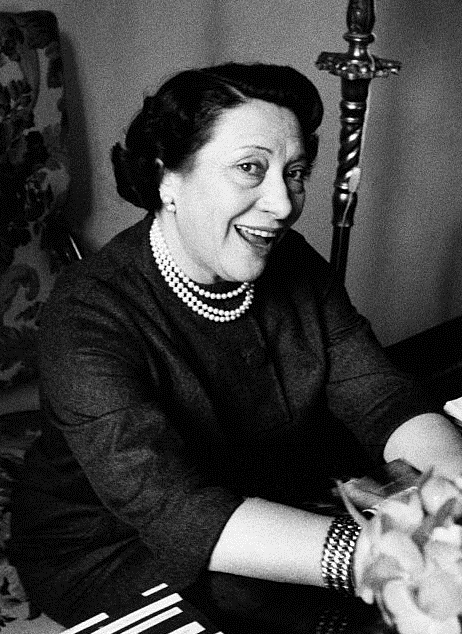
Mafalda Favero in 1953

Giuseppina Favero (6 January 1903 – 3 September 1981), known by the pseudonym Mafalda Favero, was an Italian operatic lyric soprano.

Mafalda Favero was born in Portomaggiore, near Ferrara. When she was 17, she started studying with Alessandro Vezzani at the Bologna Conservatory and attracted the attention of Franco Alfano. She began her professional career in her early 20s in Cremona before moving to Parma, where she sang several roles. She eventually transferred to La Scala, where she debuted singing Eva in Die Meistersinger von Nürnberg under Arturo Toscanini in 1929.

She remained one of the regular singers at La Scala until 1950, in addition to singing in London (Royal Opera House) in 1937 and 1939, and in the United States (Metropolitan Opera and San Francisco Opera) in 1938. She had a large repertoire, which included many contemporary works. She sang in the first performances of Alfano's L'ultimo Lord, Mascagni's Pinotta, Zandonai's Farsa amorosa, and Wolf-Ferrari's Il campiello, including his operatic adaptation of de Vega's play La dama Boba.

Although initially attracted to the role of Puccini's Madama Butterfly, she later blamed this for her early retirement in 1954; Favero said "the role of Cio-Cio-San was my ruination ... to sing it as I did, giving everything I had and then some, exacted an enormous price... am quite aware that Butterfly cut short my career by at least five years".

Giulietta Simionato remarked on her "animal sensuality" and said "[Favero] gave away a great deal of herself – more than was good for her – but the result was extremely moving."

She died in Milan in 1981, at age 78.

== Recordings ==
Preiser have published a collection of Favero's recordings on CD in their Lebendige Vergangenheit series (Mono 89162). The series contains the 1937 'Cherry Duet' (Suzel, buon di) with Tito Schipa from Mascagni's L'amico Fritz.

== Bibliography ==
- The Last Prima Donnas, by Lanfranco Rasponi and Alfred A Knopf, 1982. ISBN 0-394-52153-6
