= Apollo Granforte =

Italian opera singer (1886–1975)

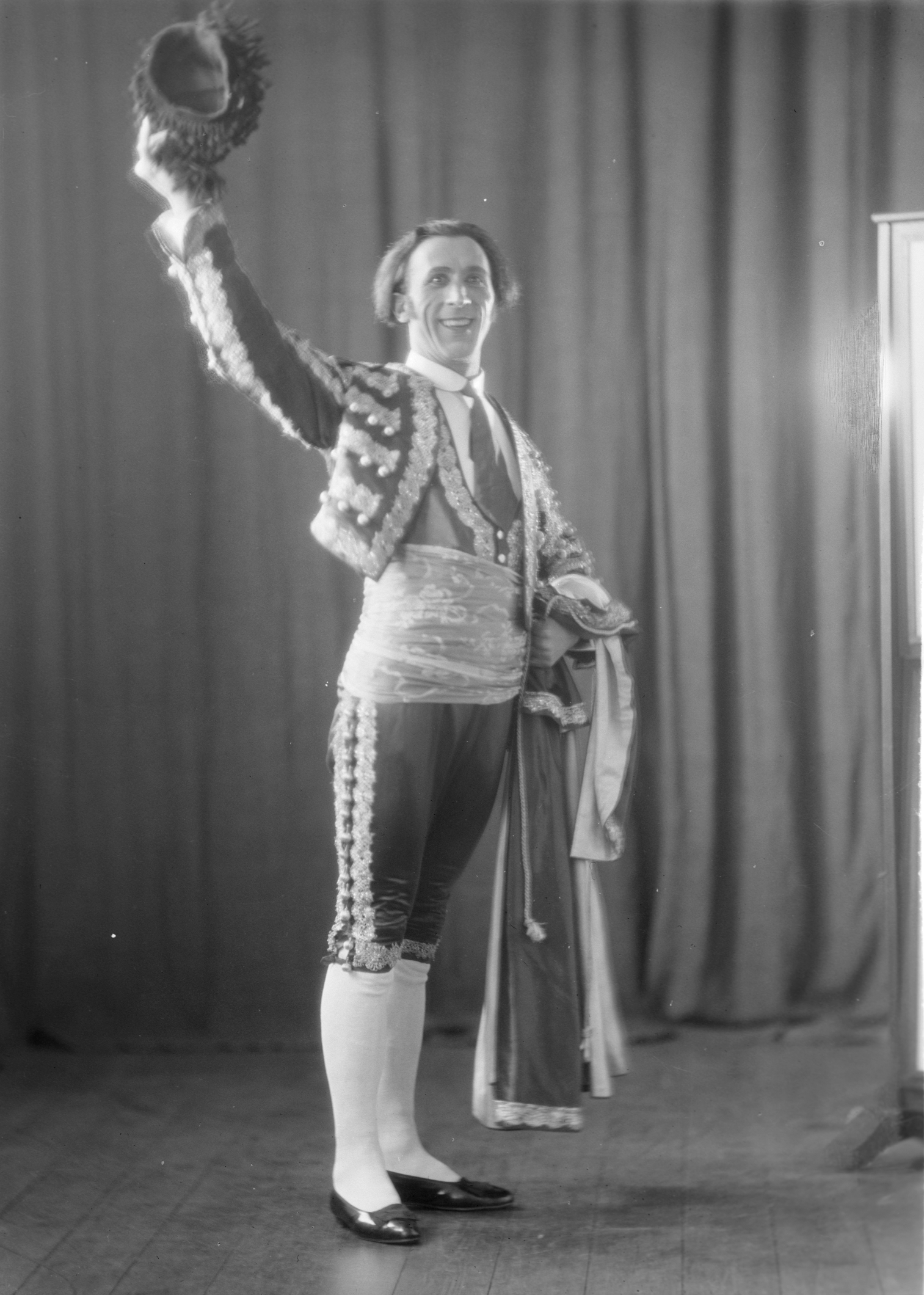
- Portrait of Italian baritone Apollo Granforte standing with arm raised

Background information
- Born: Apollinare Granforte; 20 July 1886; Legnano, Italy
- Origin: Legnano, Italy
- Died: 11 June 1975 (aged 88) Milan, Italy
- Genres: Opera
- Occupations: operatic and concert baritone
- Years active: 1913-1975

Apollo Granforte (20 July 1886 – 11 June 1975) was an Italian opera singer and one of the leading baritones during the inter-war period of the 20th century.

== Early years and education ==
Granforte was born in Legnago on 20 July 1886 and abandoned 2 days later at the entrance of Ospedale Civile in Legnano. The nuns at the hospice remarked on his large body and strong profile and thus dubbed him Apollinare Granforte, the name which the president Giovanni Tebon wrote down in the hospice's official records. He was adopted by Gaetano Brigo and Rosa Uccelli, a couple from Noventa Vicentina. At nine years old, he was an apprentice cobbler and enjoyed acting and singing at the small theater in town. At 16 he sang tenor in Lucia di Lammermoor, put on by a small company that traveled the countryside and performed in town squares.

On 5 October 1905, Granforte married eighteen-year-old Amabile Frison. They had a daughter, Maria, in the same year and emigrated to Buenos Aires in Argentina to be with Granforte's brother Erminio Brigo. He continued to work as a shoemaker, and on Sundays sang for the Italian immigrants in local taverns. There he was heard by a wealthy music lover named Pedro Valmagia (aka Pietro Balmaggia), who paid for him to study at the La Prensa Conservatory of Buenos Aires. He then transferred to the Instituto Musical Santa Cecilia in the same city, studying with masters Nicholas (Nicola?) Guerrera and Guido Capocci.

Granforte made his stage debut in Rosario, as Germont, in 1913 when he was 27. In that same year he debuted in a concert in La Plata, singing "Eri tu" from Un ballo in maschera and the "Ciel! mio padre" duet from Aida with a soprano student at the Verdi Conservatory in La Plata.

In 1913, at the age of 27, Granforte made his stage debut as Germont at the Rosario Politeama. His success there led to successive engagements at other provincial theatres in Buenos Aires. By 1915 he had also appeared at the Buenos Aires Politeama, the Solis of Montevideo and at Pelotas, Rio Grande and Porto Allegre in Brazil. In one four-week period at Montevideo he sang Silvio in Pagliacci, Marcello in La bohème, Alfio in Cavalleria rusticana, Germont in Traviata, Enrico in Lucia, Rigoletto, Barnaba in La Gioconda, Valentin in Faust, Amonasro in Aida, and Alfonso in La favorita.

While still in Argentina, Granforte and Frison had two more daughters, Ofelia and Leonora. At the outbreak of World War I, Granforte and family returned to Italy sponsored by Valmagia, who had earlier helped the baritone begin his studies. Granforte enlisted at Parma as a grenadier, but became ill and was found unsuitable for the front lines. He then toured the war zone entertaining the Italian troops, alongside Alessandro Bonci and Elvira de Hidalgo.

== Career ==
External videos
- “Rare FILM of Apollo Granforte - Largo al factotum [Il barbiere di Siviglia] - 1932”, on YouTube

After the war, while Granforte was singing at the Teatro Costanzi in Rome, his fourth daughter, Costanza, was born. The director of the Opera, Emma Carelli, sent Granforte to Milan for finishing touches in his vocal technique and repertoire. He studied there with the bass Luigi Lucenti and coach Tullio Voghera.

In 1919, Granforte was at Naples and there met composer Pietro Mascagni. They became lifelong friends and collaborators, the latter always choosing the former as lead baritone when he conducted. In 1921, the impresario Lusardi introduced Granforte to La Scala in Milan. Conductor Arturo Toscanini entrusted the role of Amfortas to him, and in 1921 he made his debut there. In 1924, he went to Australia on a successful tour with Nellie Melba, and again in 1928. During Granforte's subsequent tour of Australia and New Zealand in J. C. Williamson's 1932 Imperial Grand Opera season, Frank Thring Sr.'s Melbourne-based Efftee Productions filmed him with the Williamson-Imperial Grand Opera Company in a selection from Rossini's The Barber of Seville. This relatively brief footage was released on VHS in 1989 by the National Film and Sound Archive of Australia.

Granforte possessed a big, rich, vibrant voice, quite similar in quality to that of Titta Ruffo, with a sinister undertone, and quickly established himself in the great baritone roles of Verdi and the verismo composers. He sang some Wagner as well, and also sang Menècrate in the first performance of Mascagni's Nerone in 1935. His last operatic appearance, after a career of ~ 1,800 performances, was on 26 February 1943 in Pizzetti's Fedra at Trieste's Teatro Verdi.

After retiring from the stage, he taught at the Music Conservatory of Ankara, then at the Prague Opera and in Milan, where he opened a music school at his residence on Via Arici in the Crescenzago section. Among his pupils were soprano Leyla Gencer, basses Raffaele Arié and Nicola Zaccaria, and tenors Flaviano Labò and Jesús Quiñones Ledesma. He participated in musical life into his 80s, and was often an adjudicator for music competitions. Besides his musical life Granforte was also a successful businessman, inventing a kind of rotating or swiveling lamp in the process. Along with business partner Luigi Devizzi he owned the factory that produced these lamps, as well as a farm, both situated at a large villa in the Milan suburb of Gorgonzola, where he died on 11 June 1975.

Granforte can be heard on His Master's Voice early-electrical 78-rpm recordings of Il trovatore, Otello, Pagliacci and Tosca. He also recorded 78-rpm discs of individual arias and duets in the 1920s and 1930s, and the best of these have been reissued on a Preiser CD anthology. He is considered to have been one of the great Italian baritones of the 1920s and 1930s, alongside Mariano Stabile, Carlo Galeffi, Cesare Formichi, Carlo Tagliabue, Benvenuto Franci and Mario Basiola.

== Repertoire ==
Roles displayed in bold type were created by Granforte in their world premiere.

Sortable table
Composer	Opera/oratorio	Role
Emilio Arrieta	Marina	Roque
Vincenzo Bellini	I puritani	Riccardo
Hector Berlioz	La damnation de Faust	Méphistophélès
Georges Bizet	Carmen	Escamillo
Georges Bizet	Les pêcheurs de perles	Zurga
Felipe Boero	El matrero	**Don Liborio**
Gianni Bucceri	Marken	**Il campanaro**
Carlos de Campos	Um caso singular	Carvalho Lopes
Alfredo Catalani	La Wally	Gellner
Alfredo Catalani	Loreley	Hermann
Nino Cattozzo	I misteri gaudiosi	**Giuseppe**
Francesco Cilea	L'arlesiana	Baldassare
Gaetano Donizetti	Don Pasquale	Dr. Malatesta
Gaetano Donizetti	La favorita	Alfonso
Gaetano Donizetti	Lucia di Lammermoor	Enrico
Luigi Gazzotti	Lo zingaro cieco	**Lucio**
Umberto Giordano	Andrea Chenier	Carlo Gérard
Umberto Giordano	Fedora	De Siriex
Umberto Giordano	La cena delle beffe	Neri Chiaramantesi
Umberto Giordano	Siberia	Gleby
Barbara Giuranna	Jamanto	**Jusuf**
Charles Gounod	Faust	Valentin
Ernst Křenek	Cefalo e Procri	**Crono**
Lamberto Landi	Il Pergolese	Enzo Spinelli
Ruggero Leoncavallo	I pagliacci	Silvio
Ruggero Leoncavallo	I pagliacci	Tonio
Ruggero Leoncavallo	Gli Zingari	Tamar
Lino Liviabella	Antigone	**Creonte**
Adriano Lualdi	La figlia del re	**Svarga**
Gian Francesco Malipiero	Giulio Cesare	**Bruto**
Pietro Mascagni	Cavalleria Rusticana	Alfio
Pietro Mascagni	Isabeau	Re Raimondo
Pietro Mascagni	L'amico Fritz	David
Pietro Mascagni	Le maschere	Capitan Spaventa
Pietro Mascagni	Lodoletta	Giannotto
Pietro Mascagni	Nerone	**Menecrate**
Pietro Mascagni	Parisina	Nicolò d'Este
Jules Massenet	Thaïs	Anthanaël
Italo Montemezzi	Hellera	Schauwalki
Italo Montemezzi	La nave	Sergio Gràtico
Italo Montemezzi	La notte di Zoraima	Pedrito
Italo Montemezzi	L'amore dei tre re	Manfredo
Giuseppe Mulè	Dafni	Sileno
Modest Mussorgsky	Boris Godunov	Boris
Jacques Offenbach	Les contes d'Hoffmann	Coppelius/Miracle/Dapertutto
Jaume Pahissa	La princesa Margarida	**El baró**
Mario Persico	Morenita	Ribera
Ildebrando Pizzetti	Fedra	Teseo
Ildebrando Pizzetti	Lo straniero	Scedeur
Amilcare Ponchielli	La gioconda	Barnaba
Giacomo Puccini	La bohème	Marcello
Giacomo Puccini	La fanciulla del West	Jack Rance
Giacomo Puccini	Il tabarro	Michele
Giacomo Puccini	Tosca	Scarpia
Ottorino Respighi	Lucrezia	Sesto Tarquinio
Ottorino Respighi	Maria egiziaca	Abbate Zosimo/Pellegrino
Igino Robbiani	Guido del popolo	Oliverotto
Gioacchino Rossini	Il barbiere di Siviglia	Figaro
Armando Seppilli	La nave rossa	Ardì
Camille Saint-Saëns	Samson et Dalila	High Priest of Dagon
Richard Strauss	Salome	Jochanaan
Eraldo Trentinaglia	Rosamunda	Alboino
Giuseppe Verdi	Aïda	Amonasro
Giuseppe Verdi	Un ballo in maschera	Renato
Giuseppe Verdi	La forza del destino	Don Carlo di Vargas
Giuseppe Verdi	Rigoletto	Rigoletto
Giuseppe Verdi	La traviata	Germont
Giuseppe Verdi	Il trovatore	Conte Di Luna
Giuseppe Verdi	Otello	Iago
Facundo de la Viña	La espigadora	Román
Franco Vittadini	Caracciolo	**Alì**
Richard Wagner	Götterdämmerung	Gunther
Richard Wagner	Lohengrin	Telramund
Richard Wagner	Parsifal	Amfortas
Richard Wagner	Parsifal	Klingsor
Richard Wagner	Siegfried	Wanderer
Richard Wagner	Tannhäuser	Wolfram
Richard Wagner	Tristan und Isolde	Kurwenal
Ermanno Wolf-Ferrari	Le donne curiose	Pantalone

== Sources ==
- Grove Music Online, J.B. Steane, Oxford University Press, 2008.
- Ledesma, Jesús Quiñones. Posts by former Granforte student on his personal and public Facebook pages, 2010–2013.
- Rideout, Bob. "Apollo Granforte", The Record Collector: A Magazine for Collectors of Recorded Vocal Art, volume 41, no. 4, 1996.
- Rideout, Bob. Posts on the Opera-L listserv, April 1999.
- Zanoli, Ivano. "Legnaghesi Famosi - Apollinare Granforte (Apollo in Arte) - Baritono", Il Basso Adige, no. 10, October 2011.
