= Ayres Borghi-Zerni =

Italian operatic soprano

- Born: 1895; Buenos Aires, Argentina
- Occupation: Italian operatic soprano

Ayres Borghi-Zerni (born 1895, Buenos Aires) was an Italian operatic soprano who had a distinguished international career from 1914 till 1928.

== Biography ==
Ayres Borghi-Zerni was born in Buenos Aires in 1895 to a musical family. Her father was Edgardo Zerni, an Italian operatic tenor of modest reputation, and her aunt was Adele Borghi, a prominent mezzo-soprano admired by Giuseppe Verdi himself. Little is known about Ayres's early years. She studied singing in Milan under a teacher called Bonanno and made her debut in 1914 at the Teatro dal Verme as Micaela in Georges Bizet's Carmen. In the next two years she made a number of successful appearances on Italian provincial stages, amongst which was the Teatro della Pergola in Florence where in 1916 she appeared as Gilda in Verdi's Rigoletto. In 1917 Ayres Borghi-Zerni toured South America, where she sang Lucia di Lammermoor in Gaetano Donizetti's opera of the same title and Violetta in Verdi's La traviata at the Gran Teatro de La Habana, National Theatre of Venezuela and the Teatro Arbeu in Mexico. The following year Ayres Borghi-Zerni made her first appearance at an important Italian opera house - Teatro Comunale di Bologna, where she performed Gilda in Rigoletto and Amina in Vincenzo Bellini's La sonnambula. This signed the beginning of her important career: in the following ten years (1918-1928) Borghi-Zerni was invited to sing at the most prominent theatres of Italy, amongst which were the Teatro Costanzi in Rome (in 1918 and 1922), the Teatro Massimo in Palermo (in 1919), the Teatro San Carlo in Naples (in 1919, 1920, 1924, 1925 and 1928), the Teatro La Fenice in Venice (in 1921, 1926 and 1927) and the Teatro Regio in Turin (in 1922). It seems quite strange, though, that she never appeared at the Teatro alla Scala. Apart from the greatest Italian stages, Borghi-Zerni was tremendously successful in at The Royal Opera House in London, where in 1919 she sang Violetta in La traviata. She also made guest appearances at the Teatro Liceo in Barcelona (also in 1919, in Gioacchino Rossini's Il barbiere di Siviglia, Lucia di Lammermoor and Rigoletto) and the Opéra de Monte-Carlo (in 1920, in La traviata, Rigoletto (as a partner of the great tenor Beniamino Gigli) and the world premiere of Raoul Gunsbourg's new opera Satan). Ayres Borghi-Zerni's career did not last long, as she seems to have retired from the stage in 1928. She gave her last performances as Violetta and Lucia in 1928 (at the Teatro San Carlo and Politeama Reinach in Parma), and after this point her life is unknown.

== Discography ==
Despite her dazzling career, Ayres Borghi-Zerni made relatively few recordings. She is best known for singing the role of Gilda in one of the first complete versions of Giuseppe Verdi's Rigoletto (with Giuseppe Danise as Rigoletto and Carlo Broccardi as Duca). This notable set was recorded by La voce del padrone in 1916 in Milan with the company of La Scala under the direction of Carlo Sabajno. Apart from this recording, Borghi-Zerni is known to have made six sets for Columbia Records, which include arias from Donizetti's Lucia di Lammermoor, Rossini's Il barbiere di Siviglia and Verdi's La traviata and Rigoletto, but they are lesser-known.
