= Aristodemo Giorgini =

Italian opera singer

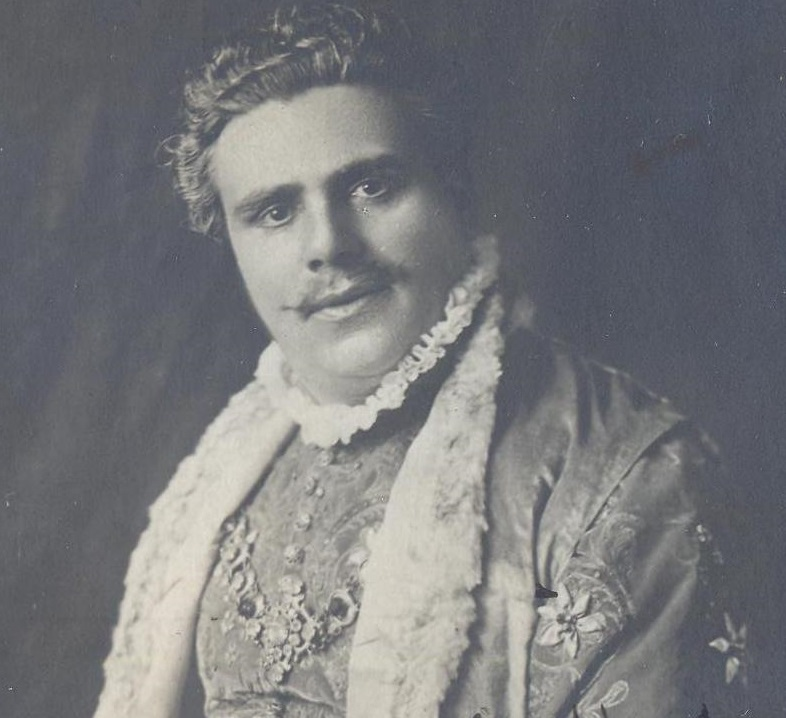
- Giorgini as the Duke of Mantua c.1913
- Born: June 30, 1877; Rome, Italy
- Died: 19 January 1937 (aged 59); Naples, Italy
- Occupation: Opera singer (tenor)

Aristodemo Giorgini (30 June 1877 – 19 January 1937) was an Italian opera singer who sang leading lyric tenor roles on the stages of Europe and North America during his 25-year career. He made numerous recordings in the early 20th century and was described by Gramophone Magazine as possessing "a sweet, steady, well-placed voice and a style distinguished by the purity of its legato." After his retirement from the stage in 1930, he taught singing in Naples, the city of his birth.

== Life and career ==
Giorgini was born in Naples and studied at the Accademia di Santa Cecilia in Rome. He made an unsuccessful stage debut in Naples in 1903 after which he pursued further private vocal studies with Massimino Perilli. (Note: Massimino Perilli (1866-1938) was a singing teacher and composer based in Naples. He primarily composed art songs, but also wrote a one-act opera, Igor, which premiered at the Teatro Mercadante in 1910. His first name is sometimes given erroneously as "Massimo".) In 1904 he made his first recording for G&T, and the following year made his La Scala debut as Ernesto in Don Pasquale. He went on to sing in most of the major opera houses in Italy. Giorgini returned to La Scala in 1910 when he had a great success as Elvino in La sonnambula opposite Rosina Storchio and again in 1913 as the tenor soloist a special performance of Verdi's Messa da Requiem commemorating the 100th anniversary of the composer's birth.

Giorgini's appearances outside Italy began early in his career when he performed at Covent Garden in 1905 as Don Ottavio in Don Giovanni, Rodolfo in La bohème (in which he alternated with tenor Emilio de Marchi), and the Duke of Mantua in Rigoletto. He sang at the Court Opera of St. Petersburg in 1906 and later sang at the Teatro Politeama in Buenos Aires, the Opéra de Monte-Carlo in Monaco, Teatro Liceo in Barcelona, the Teatro Real in Madrid, and the Teatro de São Carlos in Lisbon. Between 1912 and 1914 Giorgini was engaged by the Chicago Grand Opera Company, performing with the company both in Chicago and on tour around the United States. Amongst the roles he sang with Chicago Opera were Gennaro in Jewels of the Madonna, Edgardo in Lucia di Lammermoor, Alfredo in La traviata, Florindo in I dispettosi amanti, (Note: I dispettosi amanti (A Lovers' Quarrel) is a one-act opera by Attilio Parelli. It was given its world premiere by the Chicago Grand Opera Company in Philadelphia in 1912 and also had performances in London in the 1920s.) Count Almaviva in The Barber of Seville, the Duke of Mantua in Rigoletto, Cavaradossi in Tosca, Elvino in La sonnambula, Don Ottavio in Don Giovanni, and Enzo in La Gioconda.

Giorgini's performances in the 1920s included Faust in Mefistofele at the Teatro dal Verme in 1920 and Cavaradossi in Tosca at the Vienna Staatsoper in 1921 as well as a concert tour through Belgium and Holland in 1923. He retired from the stage in 1930 and became a singing teacher in Naples where he died in 1937.

== Recordings ==
Giorgini made multiple recordings for the G&T, Pathé, Edison, and His Master's Voice labels. Most of these were individual arias, but in 1928 towards the end of his career he was recorded in a full-length La bohème with Carlo Sabajno conducting the La Scala Orchestra and Chorus. Rosina Torri (Note: Rosina Torri (1898–1975) was an Italian soprano active primarily in Italian opera houses, including La Scala, between 1919 and 1937.) was the Mimì to his Rodolfo. Originally released on the His Master's Voice label, a remastered version of this recording was released on CD by VAI in 1994.

In 1995, The Record Collector released the CD The Art of Aristodemo Giorgini, a collection of 27 art songs and arias most of which were recorded early in Giorgini's career. The operas represented include L'Africaine, Tosca, Fedora, I puritani, La sonnambula, Les pêcheurs de perles, Luisa Miller, Adriana Lecouvreur, Werther, Il Barbiere di Siviglia, Don Pasquale, Lucia di Lammermoor, Pagliacci, and La fanciulla del West.

"Ah! fuyez, douce image"
from Massenet's Manon, recorded by Giorgini in 1910 for Edison Records
