= Pinotta =

Opera by Pietro Mascagni

Pinotta is an idillio or opera in 2 acts by Pietro Mascagni from an Italian libretto by Giovanni Targioni-Tozzetti. The opera received its first performance on 23 March 1932 at the Teatro del Casinò in San Remo.

Pinotta is based on two youthful works of Mascagni: his cantata In Filanda (1881), which was combined with the song La tua stelle (1882). The libretto was written by Giovanni Targioni-Tozzetti, a long-time collaborator of the composer, and tells the love story of Baldo, a worker, and Pinotta, a young hand-spinner in Andrea's workshop. In the end, Baldo and Pinotta get married. The opera was successful and had several other performances in Italy (Florence, Naples, Rome, Turin). Today, Pinotta is rarely performed.

== Roles ==
Roles, voice types, premiere cast
| Role | Voice type | Premiere cast, 23 March 1932 Conductor: Pietro Mascagni |
|---|---|---|
| Pinotta | soprano | Mafalda Favero |
| Baldo | tenor | Alessandro Ziliani |
| Andrea | baritone | Ernesto Badini |

== Recordings ==
There exist only two live recordings of Pinotta:

- 1974: Maria Luisa Cioni (Pinotta), Giuseppe Vertechi (Baldo), Lino Puglisi (Andrea) – RAI Orchestra, Gennaro D'Angelo – Unique Opera Records Co.
- 1995: Gloria Guida Borelli (Pinotta), Antonio De Palma (Baldo), Thomas Mürk (Andrea) – Orchestra Festival di Bruxelles, Dirk De Caluwé – Bongiovanni
