= Angelo Lo Forese =

Italian tenor

Angelo Lo Forese, sometimes written as Loforese (27 March 1920 Milan – 14 May 2020 Milan), was an Italian lyric tenor.

== Life and career ==
Born on March 27, 1920, in Milan, he began studying music at the age of 18.

During World War II, he lived in Switzerland and at the end of the conflict he moved back to Milan, where he studied with Primo Montanari, Emilio Ghirardini, and Aureliano Pertile.

He debuted as a baritone in the role of Silvio in Pagliacci in 1948, while his first role as a tenor was in the role of Manrico in Il Trovatore in 1952.

During his long career he sang in more than eighty operas, performing in many theaters in Europe, America and Africa, as well as in Japan. After retiring from the stage he worked as a teacher. The writer Domenico Gullo dedicated the book Angelo Loforese - The tenor with the suitcase packed under the bed to him in 2012.

On 16 March 2013 at the Rosetum cultural center in Milan, at the age of 93, he celebrated 60 years since his debut in the role of Manrico by performing, among other arias, the famous cabaletta "Di quella pira", with the execution of two high Cs.

He died in Milan in 2020 at Casa di Riposo per Musicisti, at the age of 100.

== Discography ==
- Riccardo Zandonai, Il bacio (live, Milan, 1954), with Lina Pagliughi, Rosetta Noli, Rosetta Papagni, dir. Francesco Molinari Pradelli - ed. EJS/Lyric Distribution
- Riccardo Zandonai, Giulietta e Romeo (live RAI, Milan, 1955), with Anna Maria Rovere, Renato Capecchi, dir. Angelo Questa - ed. EJS
- Giuseppe Verdi, Don Carlo (live, Florence, 1956), with Cesare Siepi, Ettore Bastianini, Anita Cerquetti, Fedora Barbieri, dir. Antonino Votto - ed. Myto
- Pietro Mascagni, Cavalleria rusticana (live, Tokyo, 1961, DVD), with Giulietta Simionato, Attilio D'Orazi, dir. Giuseppe Morelli - ed. VAI
- Riccardo Zandonai, Giulietta e Romeo (studio, 1961), with Antonietta Mazza Medici, Mario Zanasi, dir. Loris Gavarini - ed. Cetra
- Ruggero Leoncavallo, Pagliacci (live, Faenza, 1968), with Edy Amedeo, Gianni Maffeo, Giuseppe Lamacchia, dir. Franco Ferraris - ed. Fabbri
- Luigi Cherubini, Medea (live, Mantova, 1971), with Magda Olivero, Loris Gambelli, Elena Baggiore, dir. Nicola Rescigno - ed. Myto
- Giacomo Meyerbeer, Les Huguenots (live, Barcelona, 1971), with Christiane Eda-Pierre, Enriqueta Tarres, Angeles Chamorro, dir. Ino Savini - ed. Opera Lovers
- Il Mito dell'Opera - ANGELO LOFORESE (compilation of live recordings, 1956-2009) - ed. Bongiovanni

== Bibliography ==
- Angelo Loforese - Il tenore con la valigia pronta sotto il letto, by Domenico Gullo, 2012.
