= Gemma Bosini =

Italian opera singer

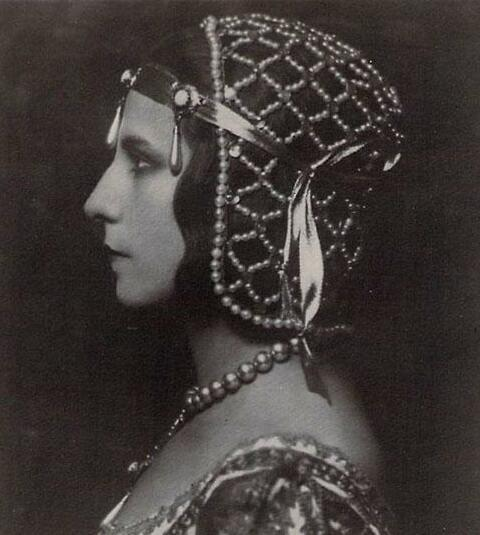
- Portrait of Bosni (ca. 1925)
- Born: 10 October 1890; Milan
- Died: 2 February 1982 (aged 91)
- Occupation: operatic soprano
- Years active: 1909–1930
- Notable work: Mimi (La boheme), Antonia (The Tales of Hoffmann), Alice Ford (Falstaff)

Gemma Bosini (10 October 1890 – 2 February 1982) was an Italian operatic soprano who had an active international performance career in 1909–1930. She is especially associated with the role of Alice Ford in Giuseppe Verdi's Falstaff, a role which she performed more than 400 times on stage during her career. She is also remembered for being the first soprano to record the role of Mimì in Giacomo Puccini's La boheme in 1917. She also made complete recordings of Gounod's Faust and Lehar's The Merry Widow. After retiring from performance in 1930, she devoted herself to teaching singing and managing the career of her husband, baritone Mariano Stabile.

== Life and career ==
Born in Milan on 10 October 1890, Bosini studied singing in her native city with Salvatore Pessina. She made her professional opera debut in 1909 as Mimi in Giacomo Puccini's La boheme at the Politaema Marengo in Novi Ligure. Later that year she toured to Quito, Ecuador where she was heard as Mimi at the Teatro Sucre. She sang Mimi several more times during her career, including performances at the Teatro Petruzzelli in Bari (1911), the Teatro Rendano in Cosenza (1912), the Politeama Rossini in Tunis (1913), the Teatro Biondo in Palermo (1914), the Teatro Apollo in Bologna (1917), the Politeama Chiarella in Turin (1918), and the Liceu in Barcelona (1919). In 1917 she became the first person to record the role of Mimi, singing the role on disc with the Orchestra and Chorus of La Scala under conductor Carlo Sabajno.

For two decades Bosini actively performed in opera houses throughout Italy, and was most frequently seen at the Teatro Massimo in Palermo where she made her debut in 1915 as Antonia in The Tales of Hoffmann. It was while doing that production that she met her husband, acclaimed baritone Mariano Stabile (1888–1968). Other Italian opera houses she performed at during her career were the Teatro della Pergola in Florence, the Teatro di San Carlo in Naples, the Teatro Lirico Giuseppe Verdi in Trieste, and the Teatro Metastasio in Prato among others. Outside of Italy, she appeared at the Liceu in Barcelona in 1918 as Donna Elvira in Don Giovanni; returning there several times over the next two years. She also gave performances at the Cairo Opera House and the Teatro Colón in Buenos Aires as Alice Ford in Verdi's Falstaff. Her last appearance was as Alice Ford at the Teatro Massimo in Palermo in 1930.

Bosini sang a wide range of parts during her career. Other roles she created on stage included Cio-Cio-San in Madama Butterfly, Desdemona in Otello, Elsa in Lohengrin, a flower maiden in Parsifal, Hanna Glawari in The Merry Widow, Maria in Guglielmo Ratcliff, Margherita in Mefistofele, Marguerita in Faust, Micaela in Carmen, Nedda in Pagliacci, and the title roles of Giordano's Fedora, Mascagni's Iris, Massenet's Manon, and Puccini's Manon Lescaut and Tosca.

After retiring from the stage in 1930, Bosini taught singing in Milan and managed her husband's career. She and her husband lived their latter years at the Casa di Riposo per Musicisti in Milan. She died there on 2 February 1982 at the age of 91.

== Sources ==
March, Ivan; Greenfield, Edward; Czajkowski, Paul; and Layton, Robert (2009). The Penguin Guide to Recorded Classical Music. Penguin. ISBN 0141041625
