= Cinema Le Palace =

Building in Tunis, Tunisia

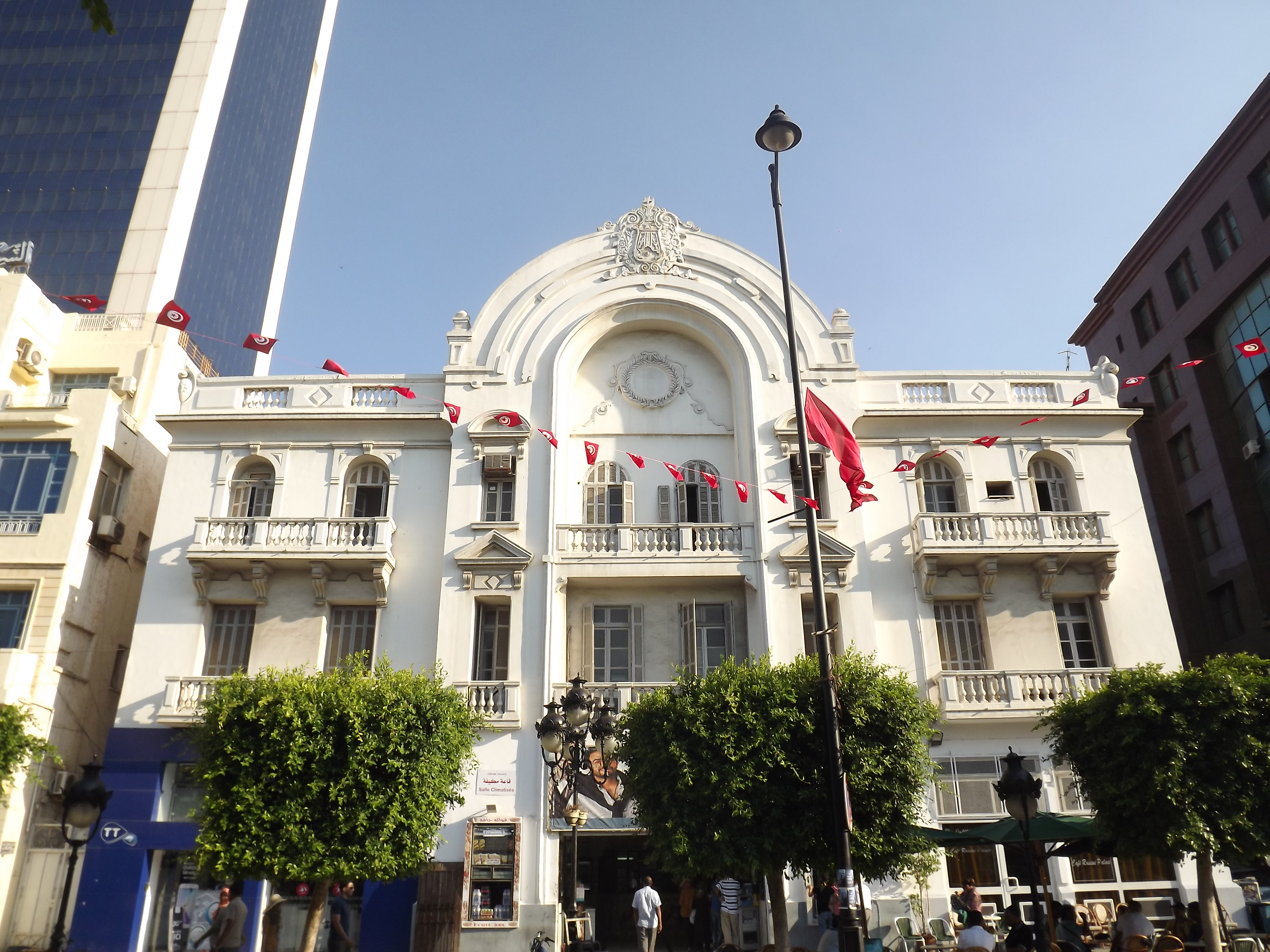
Building facade

Cinema Le Palace, formerly known as Politeama Rossini or Rossini Palace, is a building located on the Avenue Habib Bourguiba in Tunisia. It is nowadays a movie theater.

== History ==
Inaugurated on 12 March 1903 as the Politeama Rossini, it was originally a theater for the Italian community in Tunisia. In 1923, it was sold and transformed into a furniture store. A few years later, it was transformed into a movie theater.

The Association de sauvegarde de la médina de Tunis (Association for the protection of the medina of Tunis) restored the building's pediment during the embellishment works of Avenue Habib Bourguiba in 2002.
