= Reno Andreini =

Italian opera singer

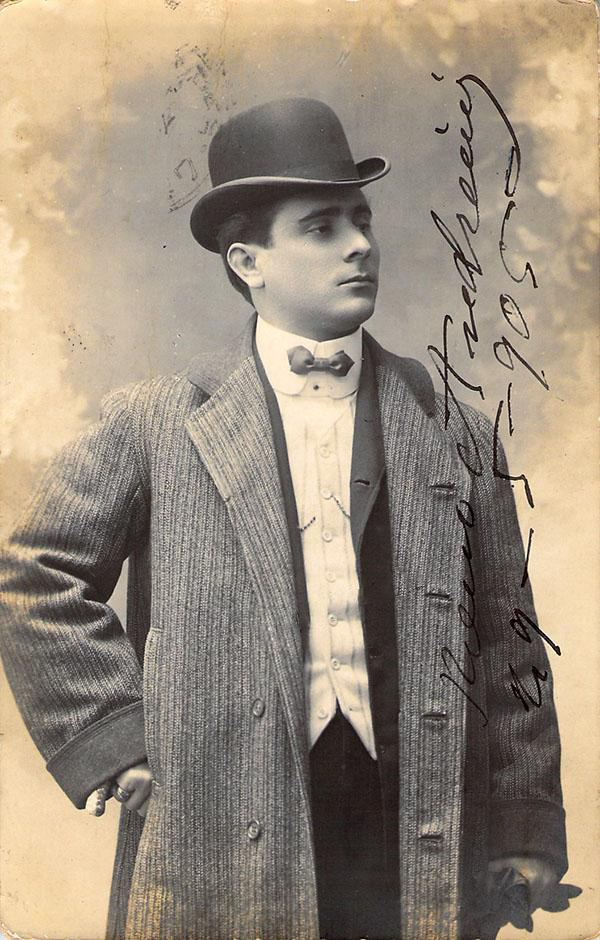
Signed image of Reno Andreini

Reno Andreini (also spelled Remo) (c. 1875–1880 in Florence – after 1924) was an Italian operatic tenor who had an active international career from 1902 to 1924. A specialist in the Italian repertoire, he was frequently heard in the bel canto operas of Bellini, Donizetti, and Rossini, and in the verismo operas of Leoncavallo, Mascagni, and Puccini. He was notably the first singer to make a complete recording of the role of Rodolfo in Puccini's La boheme in 1917. He also recorded duets from La traviata with Maria Galvany and one duet from Massenet's Manon with Riccardo Tegani with the Gramophone Company.

== Life and career ==
Born in Florence, Andreini studied at the Conservatorio Luigi Cherubini in his native city. He made his debut at the Teatro Nicolini in Florence in 1902 as Arturo to Luisa Tetrazzini's Elvira in Vincenzo Bellini's I puritani. Later that year he portrayed Elvino in Bellini's La sonnambula at the Teatro Lirico Giuseppe Verdi in Trieste. In 1903 he sang the title role in Offenbach's The Tales of Hoffmann at the Teatro del Corso in Bologna, and appeared in roles at the Teatro Petruzzelli in Bari.

In 1904, Andreini was committed to the Teatro Massimo in Palermo, where he notably portrayed Turiddu opposite Eugenia Burzio's Santuzza and Pasquale Amato's Alfio in a lauded production of Pietro Mascagni's Cavalleria rusticana. Other roles he sang at Palermo that year included Edgardo in Donizetti's Lucia di Lammermoor and Almaviva in Rossini's The Barber of Seville. In 1905, he sang Hoffmann for his debut at the Teatro Costanzi in Rome and in 1906 he toured Russia, where he was seen as the Duke of Mantua in Giuseppe Verdi's Rigoletto at both the Mariinsky Theatre in St Petersburg and the Solodovnikov Theatre in Moscow.

In 1907, Andreini returned to Italy to join the roster of artists at the Politaema Parma, where he made his debut as Canio in Ruggero Leoncavallo's Pagliacci. This was followed by performances of Milio Dufresne in Leoncavallo's Zazà and Donizetti's Edgardo di Ravenswood later that year. Andreini later sang Milio for his debut at the Teatro di San Carlo in Naples in 1910. He was also seen at the Teatro del Giglio in Lucca in 1910 as Chevalier des Grieux in Giacomo Puccini's Manon Lescaut.

In 1911, Andreini was committed to the Teatro Regio in Turin, where he made his debut as Walter in Alfredo Catalani's Loreley. In Turin, he also created the role of Luciano in the world premiere of Raffaele De Miero's Morgana on February 16, 1911. In 1915, he returned to Palermo to sing Cavaradossi in Puccini's Tosca. In 1916, he was committed to the Havana Opera in Cuba, where he performed Alfredo in La traviata to Amelita Galli-Curci's Violetta for his debut with the company. He was also Galli-Curci's partner in productions of Lucia di Lammermoor and in La Sonnambula in Havana that year.

In 1917, Andreini returned to Italy to once again join the roster of singers at the Teatro Costanzi in Rome. Roles he sang in Rome over the next two seasons included Dick Johnson in Puccini's La fanciulla del West, Don José in Bizet's Carmen, and Pinkerton in Puccini's Madama Butterfly. That same year, he became the first person to record the role of Rodolfo in La boheme, singing the role on disc with the Orchestra and Chorus of La Scala under conductor Carlo Sabajno. In 1924 gave his last known performances in the Netherlands as Alfredo and Don Jose to Gemma Bellincioni's Violetta and Carmen. His activities and whereabouts are unknown after this point.

== Sources ==
- March, Ivan; Greenfield, Edward; Czajkowski, Paul; and Layton, Robert (2009). The Penguin Guide to Recorded Classical Music. Penguin. ISBN 0141041625
