= Luigi Bolis =

Italian opera singer

Luigi Bolis (29 July 1839 in Mapello – 1 September 1905 in Gorlago) was an Italian tenor. After his triumphant debut in 1864, he became an important opera singer in major theaters in Italy and in Europe in the 1870s. His name is engraved at the Italian Hospital of Buenos Aires.

== Career ==
He was the first to cover the role of Sveno in I Goti by Stefano Gobatti (1873) Corrado of Wallenrod in I Lituani by Amilcare Ponchielli (1874), The Merchant of Venice by Ciro Pinsuti (1873), and Gustavo Wasa by Filippo Marchetti (1875). Luigi has appeared at both the Teatro Costanzi Roma and the Teatro Regio Torino, as well as other notable venues throughout Europe.

Luigi Bolis began as a baritone but singing as a tenor soon became standard. His repertoire included, among other things, many works of Giuseppe Verdi. He was comfortable singing a variety of different roles, but his ideal parts were dramatic. He married the soprano Maria Zappettini, with whom he had his son Dante, who became a baritone who would also later marry a soprano.

Bolis's career was short and intense. In 1879 he retired aged just 39, in the midst of success, to his splendid villa on the banks of the Cherio River in Gorlago, where he became a farmer. For some years he was mayor of the town. He died there on 1 September 1905, the day after his biggest rival, Francesco Tamagno.
