= Miriam Gauci =

Maltese singer (born 1957)

Miriam Gauci (born 3 April 1957) is a Maltese operatic soprano, particularly associated with lyric Italian roles.

== Life and career ==
Miriam Gauci was born in Malta on 3 April 1957. She began her voice training in her native city, and then completed her studies in the Conservatorio Giuseppe Verdi of Milan, Italy. After winning a few international prizes, she made her professional debut in Bologna in Francis Poulenc's La voix humaine, in 1984. Her well-managed voice, unified from top to bottom, of moderate volume and fine quality, fitted her well for the lyric Italian repertory and she was soon in demand throughout Europe.

She made her La Scala debut in 1985, in the role of Proserpina in the first modern revival of Luigi Rossi's Orfeo. In the following season, she returned in Die Frau ohne Schatten and La Sonnambula. She also appeared in Hamburg, Geneva, and at the Wexford Festival, and sang both Marguerite and Elena in Boito's Mefistofele at the Vienna State Opera. Other roles have included; Donizetti's Anna Bolena, Verdi's Violetta in La Traviata, Gilda in Rigoletto, and Luisa Miller, Donizetti's Adina in Elisir d'Amor, Mozart's Donna Elvira and Illia, and Massenet's title role in Manon.

By 1992, Miriam Gauci was already a favourite in Vienna, Munich, Hamburg and Santa Fe. She has collaborated with Riccardo Muti (Mefistofele and Verdi's Requiem at the Salzburg Festival), Georges Prêtre (Verdi's Requiem), Claudio Abbado (Lohengrin at La Scala), Franz Welser-Möst (Don Carlo in Cleveland), Aldo Ceccato, Gianluigi Gelmetti, Zubin Mehta (Don Carlo and Mahler's Symphonies), and in Verdi's Requiem at the Musikverein under the baton of Vladimir Fedoseyev.

She performed in productions by Jean-Pierre Ponnelle (La bohème at the Dorothy Chandler's Pavilion in Los Angeles in 1987 and Massenet's Manon at the Vienna State Opera in 1997), Dietrich Hillsdorf (Don Carlo at the Aalto Musiktheater of Essen in 1988), Steven Pimlott (Micaela in Carmen at Earl's Court in London in 1989), Robert Carsen’s Manon Lescaut in Antwerp (1991) and Paris (1993) respectively, Robert Wilson (Cio-Cio San in Paris National Opera in 1994), Harry Kupfer (Suor Angelica at the Hamburg State Opera in 1995), Franco Zeffirelli (La bohème at the San Carlo of Naples in 1996), Pier'Alli (Mefistofele at the Vienna State Opera in 1998–2000), and Giorgio Strehler (Contessa in Le nozze di Figaro at the Teatro alla Scala of Milan in 2005).

She made her American debut at the Santa Fe Opera in New Mexico, in 1987, as Cio-Cio San in Madama Butterfly, and later that same year appeared as Mimì in La bohème in Los Angeles, opposite Plácido Domingo. Her Metropolitan debut in New York came in 2001 with role of Mimì, followed by Cio-Cio San and Mimì at San Francisco's War Memorial Opera House.

She can be heard in many recordings, notably in Pagliacci, Manon Lescaut, Madama Butterfly, Simon Boccanegra, Otello, La bohème, Tosca, Suor Angelica, Gianni Schicchi, Beethoven's Ninth Symphony and Egmont, Brahms' Requiem, Don Carlo's Act 5 duet with Ramon Vargas for RCA, as well as a recital of Italian opera arias for Naxos.

Her career has continued with concerts and recitals across Europe and the United States, and she proved an effective interpreter in certain roles, notably Butterfly, Manon Lescaut, Angelica and Mimì.
