= Mariano Stabile =

Italian opera singer

Mariano Stabile in 1943

Mariano Stabile (12 May 1888 in Palermo, Italy – 11 January 1968 in Milan, Italy) was an Italian baritone, particularly associated with the Italian repertory, especially the role of Falstaff.

== Career ==
Stabile's vocal studies took place at the Accademia di Santa Cecilia in Rome with Antonio Cotogni during the 1907–08 and 1908-09 academic years. He made his professional debut in Palermo, as Marcello in La bohème, in 1909. After singing throughout Italy, he appeared in Saint Petersburg in 1911, Buenos Aires in 1913, Barcelona in 1914, and made his debut at the Paris Opera in 1917, as Amonasro in Aida.

The turning point of his career came when Arturo Toscanini chose him for the title-role in Falstaff for the reopening of La Scala in 1921, a role that he would eventually sing an estimated 1200 times during his long career. He sang at La Scala until 1955, and among his other roles there were: Gérard, Scarpia, Iago, Malatesta, Dulcamara, Beckmesser, Schicchi. Also at La Scala, he created the title role of Respighi's Belfagor, in 1923. He also took part in the revival of Il turco in Italia, as Prosdocimo, in 1955, opposite Maria Callas.

Stabile appeared regularly at the Royal Opera House in London, from 1926 to 1931. He also sang at the Festivals of Glyndebourne and Salzburg between 1931 and 1939, and in Mozart roles such as Figaro, Don Giovanni, Don Alfonso, at the Cambridge Theatre in London from 1946 to 1949. His only appearance in North America seems to have been in Chicago in 1924.

Stabile was said to have a good voice, if not particularly remarkable. He was a successful singing-actor, especially in comedy, and he enjoyed a remarkably long career. He was married to Italian soprano Gemma Bosini (1890–1982), with whom he occasionally appeared on stage.

Mariano Stabile as Sisto Beckmesser in I maestri cantori di Norimberga (Die Meistersinger von Nürnberg), Teatro alla Scala, Milan, 1940-1941 (1945 dedication)

Mariano Stabile in Tosca, Teatro alla Scala (1945 dedication)

== Sources ==
- D. Hamilton (ed.), The Metropolitan Opera Encyclopedia: A Complete Guide to the World of Opera (Simon and Schuster, New York 1987). ISBN 0-671-61732-X
- Roland Mancini and Jean-Jacques Rouveroux, (orig. H. Rosenthal and J. Warrack, French edition), Guide de l’opéra, Les indispensables de la musique (Fayard, 1995). ISBN 2-213-59567-4
