= Arthaus =

German film production company

- Company type: Incentive GmbH
- Industry: record label
- Founded: 1994; Germany
- Headquarters: Germany
- Parent: StudioCanal

Arthaus is a major German producer of art films and classical music DVDs founded in 1994. Arthaus is a brand of Kinowelt Home Entertainment Gmbh, which is now owned by Studiocanal. Arthaus acquired the video back-catalogue of Filmverlag der Autoren in 1999, and then EuroArts giving it hundreds of art-films, opera, ballet, and concert titles to draw upon.

== History ==
Founded in 1994, Arthaus Video Vertriebsgesellschaft is a video distribution company associated with Kinowelt Home Entertainment. Arthaus released its first ten films on VHS on May 1, 1994. In October 1998, the first DVD releases with titles such as Boogie Nights and Kundun were announced. In 2007, the company released its first Blu-ray title, The Journey of the Penguins. Arthaus published a 236-page general catalogue in 2010 which featured around 1,000 Arthaus titles.

== Special Editions ==
The Arthaus Premium edition includes new editions of film classics such as The Third Man. The Arthaus Collection edition includes 50 works by renowned directors. This series was continued with Arthaus Collection Classics, Arthaus Collection Classics II, Arthaus Collection Literature, Arthaus Collection Literature II, Arthaus Collection Asian Cinema, Arthaus Collection British Cinema, Arthaus Collection American Independent Cinema and Arthaus Collection Documentary Film. Together with Rolling Stone magazine, Arthaus presents the Music Movies Collection with twelve music films. The limited Filmverlag der Autoren Edition contains 50 works from 1968 to 2008, including 22 on DVD for the first time, and an illustrated book with 160 pages. The Edition Deutscher Film includes 50 works from 1924 to 2009 and is the first comprehensive series on German film. The StudioCanal Collection presents older films (The Elephant Man and others) on Blu-ray for the first time with new bonus material and a 20-page booklet.
