= Carlo Broccardi =

Italian opera singer

Carlo Broccardi (1886–1953) was an Italian operatic tenor who had an active international career during the first third of the 20th century. He notably sang for the first complete recordings of Giuseppe Verdi's Rigoletto (1915, the Duke of Mantua) and Giacomo Puccini's Tosca (1919, Cavaradossi); both for His Master's Voice. He also made recordings for the Fonografia Nazionale and Kalliope record labels.

== Career ==
Broccardi studied singing in Milan with Antonio Aversa. He made his professional opera debut in 1911 at the Teatro Corso in Bologna as the title hero in Richard Wagner's Lohengrin. He was soon engaged with major opera houses throughout Italy, including the Teatro Carlo Felice, the Teatro Comunale di Bologna, the Teatro di San Carlo, and the Teatro Regio di Torino. In 1919, he made his debut at the Teatro Costanzi in Rome as the Duke of Mantua in Giuseppe Verdi's Rigoletto.

In 1922 Broccardi performed several parts opposite Toti dal Monte at the Teatro Massimo in Palermo; including the Duke of Mantua, Giuseppe Hagenbacha in Alfredo Catalani's La Wally, and Pinkerton in Puccini's Madama Butterfly. In 1924, he sang the role of Osaka in Pietro Mascagni's Iris at the Teatro Municipale in Piacenza. In 1925, he performed the role of Enzo Grimaldo in La Gioconda at La Fenice opposite Tina Poli-Randaccio in the title role. In 1926, he made his debut at La Scala in Milan and at the Liceu in Barcelona. Also that year, he undertook a concert tour of Spain. He appeared as a guest artist at the Teatro Colón and other South American theatres during the 1920s. He retired from the stage sometime during the early 1930s. In 1951, he became a resident of the Casa di Riposo per Musicisti.
