= Lionello Cecil =

Australian opera singer

Lionello Cecil (20 September 1893 – 13 November 1957) was an Australian operatic tenor. Much of his training and early career took place in Italy.

== Early life and career ==
Lionello Cecil was born in Waverley, in Sydney, as Lionel Cecil Sherwood. The son of a senior police sergeant, his first music teacher was Hector Fleming, and Cecil gave his first performance on 30 September 1912 at the age of 19. Cecil's second teacher was Andrew Black, who encouraged him to study abroad, so Lionello went to Italy in March 1914. Once there he was awarded a scholarship to the Verdi Regio Conservatorio in Milan, and began studying with Mario Pieraccini. In 1918 he made his debut as an opera singer, under the stage name of Lionello Cecil, performing in the Storchi Theatre of Modena as Duca di Mantova (Verdi's Rigoletto). After his great success, he made a lot of operatic debuts in the other Italian opera theatres and became a leading tenor of the Italian Provincial Houses. In London, while he was on a concert tour, he married Argia Armanda Giustina Mattioni, a ballerina from Trieste, Italy.

== Career ==
Over many years Cecil gave hundreds of performances in the opera theatres all over Italy. He also sang outside Italy, in 1926 in South America, and in 1927 in various European countries. He sang leading roles in the first complete microphone recording of Verdi's La Traviata (Alfredo, 1928), and in Puccini's Madama Butterfly (Pinkerton, 1929–30). He returned to Australia in 1932 to tour with the J.C. Williamson Opera Company, and later took part in a six-month contract with ABC performing live opera.

== Later life ==
Cecil worked for ABC until 1942, in addition to touring, then began teaching. In July 1944 he made his last performance at the New South Wales State Conservatorium of Music where he played Canio in Pagliacci. He died on 13 November 1957, in St. Leonards, Sydney.
