= Franco Ghione =

Italian conductor and violinist

- Franco Ghione (photo with 1956 dedication)
- Occupations: conductor and violinist

Franco Ghione (1886–1964) was an Italian conductor and violinist. He graduated from the Parma Conservatory and became a violinist for the Parma Theatre and the Augusteo in Rome. He began a conducting career in 1913 and conducted in many opera houses, including La Scala. He conducted the Detroit Symphony Orchestra from 1936 to 1940, where it was said that, because he could not speak English, he "would explode in frustration" when his instructions were not understood.

After graduating in composition and violin at the Parma Conservatory, Ghione began his musical career as a violinist in the orchestras of the Parma Theatre and of the Augusteo in Rome, and then he made his debut as a conductor in 1913. His first appearance at La Scala was in the 1922–23 season with successful performances of Massenet's Manon and Donizetti's Lucia di Lammermoor. From then on, he was regularly invited to conduct in major opera houses and worked with the finest voices of the period. He has left us numerous interesting recordings, among which we recall especially Pagliacci (by Leoncavallo) with Beniamino Gigli; Mascagni's Cavalleria Rusticana with Del Monaco and Elena Nicolai; Puccini's Turandot with Gina Cigna, Francesco Merli, and Magda Olivero; Massenet's Werther with Tito Schipa; and Verdi's La traviata with Maria Callas.
