= Carlo Galeffi =

Italian opera singer

- Carlo Galeffi (photo with 1943 dedication)
- Occupation: opera singer
- Years active: 1904-

Carlo Galeffi (4 June 1884 – 22 September 1961) was a leading Italian baritone, particularly associated with the operatic works of Giuseppe Verdi and the various verismo composers.

== Life and career ==
Galeffi was born in Malamocco, the only settlement on the Lido of Venice. As a youth, he studied with Di Como and Enrico Sbriscia; later he followed a finishing course with Antonio Cotogni. According to The Concise Oxford Dictionary of Opera, he made his professional debut in 1904, aged 21, at Rome's Teatro Adriano, as Enrico in Lucia di Lammermoor. Galeffi sang throughout Italy before reaching Italy's premier opera house, La Scala, Milan, in 1912. He would remain at La Scala until 1938, becoming a favorite of the conductor Arturo Toscanini.

Carlo Galeffi in Rigoletto, Teatro alla Scala, Milan, 1933-1934

Galeffi made his American debut in Boston in 1910. He sang at the New York Metropolitan Opera only once, on November 29 of that same year, as Verdi's Germont père in La Traviata. Galeffi sang, too, at the Lyric Opera of Chicago from 1919 to 1921, and also appeared in South America on a number of occasions.

Galeffi was much appreciated at the Teatro Colón in Buenos Aires. He debuted there in 1914 singing in six operas, and went on to sing at the Colón during 15 seasons through 1952. He performed in 31 different operas, or about half of his vast repertoire. Enzo Valenti Ferro, musicologist and former Director General of the Colón, considered that Galeffi was one of the most accomplished baritones to have performed at that opera house.

The bulk of Galeffi's career, however, took place in Italy, especially at La Scala, where he was much acclaimed for his performances of Verdi roles that ranged from Nabucco, through Renato, Di Luna, Amonasro and Simon Boccanegra, to Iago. Other parts that he sang included Tell in Rossini's Guglielmo Tell, Douglas in Mascagni's Guglielmo Ratcliff, Scarpia in Puccini's Tosca, Tonio in Leoncavallo's Pagliacci, Gerard in Giordano's Andrea Chénier, Amfortas in Wagner's Parsifal and Telramund in Wagner's Lohengrin.

At the Costanzi theatre in Rome in 1919, Galeffi gave Europe's first performances of the roles of Gianni Schicchi in Gianni Schicchi and Michele in Il tabarro, both composed by Puccini. He also created Manfredo in Montemezzi's L'amore dei tre re, Fanuel in Boito's Nerone (at La Scala in 1913 and 1924 respectively), Raimondo in Mascagni's Isabeau (at Buenos Aires in 1911), and William in Gino Marinuzzi's Jacquerie.

Galeffi possessed a beautiful voice supported by an excellent technique. He is considered to have been one of the finest operatic baritones active during the period between the outbreak of World War I and the onset of World War II. He made many acoustic and electrical recordings, some of which are available on CD re-issues. He died, aged 79, in Rome.

== Sources ==
- D. Hamilton (ed.), The Metropolitan Opera Encyclopedia: A Complete Guide to the World of Opera (Simon and Schuster, New York 1987). ISBN 0-671-61732-X
- Roland Mancini and Jean-Jacques Rouveroux, (orig. H. Rosenthal and J. Warrack, French edition), Guide de l'opéra, Les indispensables de la musique (Fayard, 1995). ISBN 2-213-59567-4
- James Anderson, The Complete Dictionary of Opera and Operetta
- Harold Rosenthal and John Warrack, The Concise Oxford Dictionary of Opera, Second Edition (Oxford University Press, London, 1980). ISBN 0-19-311321-X.
- Enzo Valenti Ferro, Las Voces: Teatro Colón 1908-82. Buenos Aires: Ediciones de Arte Gaglianone, 1983. ISBN 950-9004-36-7
