= Valentina Bartolomasi =

Italian singer

Valentina Bartolomasi (1889–1932) was an Italian soprano whose opera career spanned from 1910 to 1927. She appeared on the recordings made of Umberto Giordano's Andrea Chénier (as Maddalena de Coigny), Giacomo Puccini's Tosca (in the title role), and Giuseppe Verdi's Aida (in the title role).

Bartolomasi made her opera debut in 1910. She became a regular performer at La Scala between 1915 and 1925. She was committed to the Teatro Petruzzelli in Bari from 1920–1921. In 1923 she was engaged by the Teatro Carlo Felice where she sang Amelia in Un ballo in maschera and Santuzza in Cavalleria Rusticana. She later returned to that house in 1925 to sing Elvira in Ernani.

Bartolomasi's career ended prematurely due to illness in 1927. She spent the last several years of her life fighting endometrial cancer from which she eventually died in 1932 in Milan.

Bartolomasi was the aunt of soprano Mirella Freni.
