= Ernesto Badini =

Italian opera singer

Ernesto Badini (born San Colombano al Lambro, 14 September 1876; died Milan, 6 July 1937) was an Italian opera singer that sang in the baritone range. He was trained at the Milan Conservatory and made his debut as Matteo (in Frà Diavolo) at Lodi's Teatro Gaffurio in 1896. Badini was a regular performer at Milan's La Scala and achieved his greatest success in the comic role of Puccini's Gianni Schicchi.

== Biography ==
In Il Signor Bruschino (Rossini), he was said to have "co-operated with a will" with a generally "excellent cast". At Covent Garden: he portrayed Marcello in Boheme (Puccini): "[not] particularly well-suited for [this part]" He also worked in South America and Salzburg.

His voice was described as "serviceable rather than rich": whilst his acting ability demonstrated "an assured style and economy of gesture"

=== First Performances ===
He participated in several first performances, as follows:

Puccini: Gianni Schicchi (premieres at Milan and Covent Garden). "... a delightful picture of Schicchi, entering fully into the spirit of the piece"

Mascagni: Il piccolo Marat (world)

Mascagni: Pinotta (world)

Giordano's La cena delle beffe (world)

Wolf-Ferrari's Sly (world).

=== Recordings ===
I Pagliacci Complete recording 1907, conductor Carlo Sabajno. Silvio. Il barbiere di Siviglia Complete recording 1919, conductor Carlo Sabajno. Figaro. See: Carlo Sabajno, Wikipedia, Discography: • 1919 Rossini: Il barbiere di Siviglia – Ernesto Badini, Malvina Pereira, Edoardo Taliani; Orchestra and Chorus of La Scala, Milan. Gramophone Company. Don Pasquale: Badini participated in the first complete recording. This performance showed him as "A one-time lyric baritone graduated into a superb buffo". "Badini speaks as much as he sings-- but what a difference when he does sing, and in the tonal solidity of the speaking too".

Several excerpts discs were also created on the following labels:

Columbia Graphophone Company

1925: excerpts: Gianni Schicchi, Magic Flute

Victor Talking Machine Company

cat 45035 Otello, Barbiere excerpts
