= La voce del padrone =

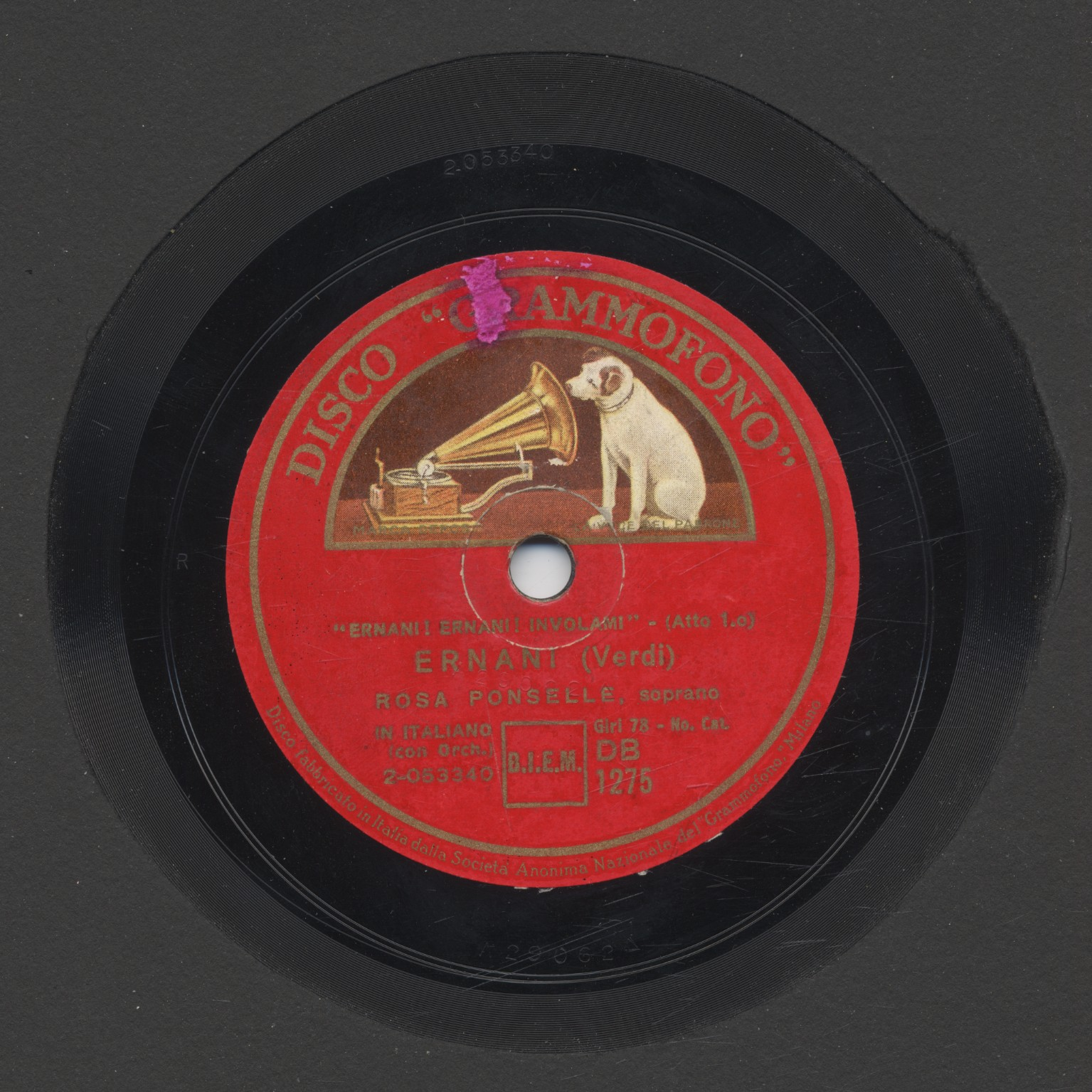
Image of a 78rpm of an aria from Giuseppe Verdi's Ernani, recorded by Grammofono/La voce del padrone

La voce del padrone ("His Master's Voice") was the Italian label and recording house for the British Gramophone Company. The Gramophone Company owned several labels in Italy, like Columbia, Marconiphone, Angel Records and Grammofono.

From 1904, Gramophone Company records were published and distributed in Italy by Saif (Società Anonima Italiana di Fonotopia), a company based in Milan. When the Gramophone Company and the Columbia Graphophone Company merged in 1931 to form EMI, Saif in turn merged with Columbia's Italian arm, SNG (Società Nazionale del Grammofono).

== See also ==
- His Master's Voice
- Gramophone Company
- EMI

== Sources ==
- Mario De Luigi (1982). L'industria discografica in Italia. Rome: Lato Side.
- Mario De Luigi (2008). Storia dell'industria fonografica in Italia. Milan: Musica e Dischi.
- Vito Vita (2019). Musica solida. Turin: Miraggi Edizioni.
