= List of films based on operas =

This is a list of feature films based on operas.

== Films based on operas ==
Opera	Composer	Librettist	Film	Year	Film director
Aleko	Sergei Rachmaninoff	Vladimir Nemirovich-Danchenko	Aleko, 1953	1953	Sergei Sidelyov
Aida	Giuseppe Verdi	Antonio Ghislanzoni	Aida, 1953	1953	Clemente Fracassi
Aida	Giuseppe Verdi	Antonio Ghislanzoni	Aida, 1987	1987	Claes Fellbom
Aida	Giuseppe Verdi	Antonio Ghislanzoni	Aida of the Trees, 2001	2001	Guido Manuli
Andrea Chénier	Umberto Giordano	Luigi Illica	Andrea Chénier, 1955	1955	Clemente Fracassi
Un ballo in maschera	Giuseppe Verdi	Antonio Somma	Masked Ball, 1917	1917	Alfréd Deésy
Bánk bán	Ferenc Erkel	Béni Egressy	Bánk bán, 2001	2001	
The Barber of Seville	Gioachino Rossini	Cesare Sterbini	The Barber of Seville, 1947	1947	Mario Costa
The Barber of Seville	Gioachino Rossini	Cesare Sterbini	The Barber of Seville, 1948	1948	Jean Loubignac
The Bartered Bride	Bedřich Smetana	Karel Sabina	The Bartered Bride, 1932	1932	Max Ophüls
The Bartered Bride	Bedřich Smetana	Karel Sabina	Prodaná nevěsta, 1975	1975	Václav Kašlík
The Beggar's Opera	Johann Christoph Pepusch	John Gay	The Beggar's Opera, 1953	1953	Peter Brook
The Beggar's Opera	Kurt Weil	Bertolt Brecht	The Threepenny Opera	1931	G. W. Pabst
Bluebeard's Castle	Béla Bartók	Béla Balázs	Herzog Blaubarts Burg, 1963	1963	Michael Powell
La bohème	Giacomo Puccini	Luigi Illica; Giuseppe Giacosa	La Bohème, 1926	1926	King Vidor
La bohème	Giacomo Puccini	Luigi Illica; Giuseppe Giacosa	La Bohème, 1965	1965	Franco Zeffirelli
La bohème	Giacomo Puccini	Luigi Illica; Giuseppe Giacosa	La Bohème, 1988	1988	Luigi Comencini
La bohème	Giacomo Puccini	Luigi Illica; Giuseppe Giacosa	Rent, 2005	2005	Chris Columbus
La bohème	Giacomo Puccini	Luigi Illica; Giuseppe Giacosa	La Bohème, 2008	2008	Robert Dornhelm
The Bohemian Girl	Michael William Balfe	Alfred Bunn	The Bohemian Girl, 1922	1922	Harley Knoles
The Bohemian Girl	Michael William Balfe	Alfred Bunn	The Bohemian Girl, 1927	1927	
The Bohemian Girl	Michael William Balfe	Alfred Bunn	The Bohemian Girl, 1936	1936	James W. Horne and Charles Rogers
Boris Godunov	Modest Mussorgsky	Modest Mussorgsky	Boris Godunov, 1954	1954	Vera Stroyeva
Boris Godunov	Modest Mussorgsky	Modest Mussorgsky	Boris Godunov, 1989	1989	Andrzej Żuławski
Carmen	Georges Bizet	Ludovic Halévy; Henri Meilhac	Gypsy Blood, 1920	1920	Karl Otto Krause
Carmen	Georges Bizet	Ludovic Halévy; Henri Meilhac	Carmen, 1931	1931	Cecil Arthur Lewis
Carmen	Georges Bizet	Ludovic Halévy; Henri Meilhac	Carmen, la de Triana, 1938	1938	Florián Rey
Carmen	Georges Bizet	Ludovic Halévy; Henri Meilhac	Nights in Andalusia, 1938	1938	Herbert Maisch
Carmen	Georges Bizet	Ludovic Halévy; Henri Meilhac	Carmen, 1942	1942	Christian-Jaque
Carmen	Georges Bizet	Ludovic Halévy; Henri Meilhac	Carmen Jones, 1954	1954	Otto Preminger
Carmen	Georges Bizet	Ludovic Halévy; Henri Meilhac	The Wild, Wild Rose, 1960	1960	Wong Tin-lam
Carmen	Georges Bizet	Ludovic Halévy; Henri Meilhac	Prénom Carmen, 1983	1983	Jean-Luc Godard
Carmen	Georges Bizet	Ludovic Halévy; Henri Meilhac	Carmen, 1984	1984	Francesco Rosi
Carmen	Georges Bizet	Ludovic Halévy; Henri Meilhac	Carmen: A Hip Hopera, 2001	2001	Robert Townsend
Carmen	Georges Bizet	Ludovic Halévy; Henri Meilhac	Karmen Geï, 2001	2001	Joseph Gaï Ramaka
Carmen	Georges Bizet	Ludovic Halévy; Henri Meilhac	U-Carmen e-Khayelitsha, 2005	2005	Mark Dornford-May
Carmen	Georges Bizet	Ludovic Halévy; Henri Meilhac	Carmen's Kiss, 2008	2008	David Fairman
Cavalleria rusticana	Pietro Mascagni	Giovanni Targioni-Tozzetti; Guido Menasci	Cavalleria rusticana, 1953	1953	Carmine Gallone
Cavalleria rusticana	Pietro Mascagni	Giovanni Targioni-Tozzetti; Guido Menasci	Cavalleria rusticana, 1982	1982	Franco Zeffirelli
Les cloches de Corneville	Robert Planquette	Louis Clairville; Charles Gabet	Les cloches de Corneville, 1917	1917	Thomas Bentley
Così fan tutte	Wolfgang Amadeus Mozart	Lorenzo Da Ponte	All Ladies Do It, 1992	1992	Tinto Brass
Dalibor	Bedřich Smetana	Josef Wenzig	Dalibor, 1956	1956	Václav Krška
The Death of Klinghoffer	John Adams	Alice Goodman	The Death of Klinghoffer, 2003	2003	Penny Woolcock
Don César de Bazan	Jules Massenet	Adolphe d'Ennery; Philippe-François Pinel "Dumanoir"; Jules Chantepie	Rosita, 1923	1923	Ernst Lubitsch
Don Giovanni	Wolfgang Amadeus Mozart	Lorenzo Da Ponte	Don Juan, 1955		Walter Kolm-Veltée
Don Giovanni	Wolfgang Amadeus Mozart	Lorenzo Da Ponte	Don Giovanni, 1979		Joseph Losey
Don Pasquale	Gaetano Donizetti	Alphonse Royer; Gustave Vaëz; Eugène Scribe	Don Pasquale, 1940		Giovanni Ruffini; Gaetano Donizetti
Le domino noir	Daniel Auber	Eugène Scribe	The Black Domino, 1929		Victor Janson
Die Entführung aus dem Serail	Wolfgang Amadeus Mozart	Gottlieb Stephanie	The Abduction from the Seraglio, 1961		Alan Burke
L'elisir d'amore	Gaetano Donizetti	Felice Romani	Der Liebestrank		
The Eternity Man	Jonathan Mills	Dorothy Porter	The Eternity Man, 2008		Julien Temple
Eugene Onegin	Pyotr Ilyich Tchaikovsky	Pyotr Ilyich Tchaikovsky; Konstantin Shilovsky	Eugene Onegin, 1959		Roman Tikhomirov
Der Evangelimann	Wilhelm Kienzl	Wilhelm Kienzl	The Evangelist, 1924		Holger-Madsen
La favorite	Gaetano Donizetti	Alphonse Royer; Gustave Vaëz; Eugène Scribe	La Favorita, 1952		Cesare Barlacchi
La fille de Madame Angot	Charles Lecocq	Clairville; Paul Siraudin; Victor Koning	La fille de Madame Angot, 1935		Jean Bernard-Derosne
La fille du régiment	Gaetano Donizetti	Jules-Henri Vernoy de Saint-Georges; Jean-François Bayard	The Daughter of the Regiment, 1953		Géza von Bolváry; Goffredo Alessandrini
La fille du régiment	Gaetano Donizetti	Jules-Henri Vernoy de Saint-Georges; Jean-François Bayard	Daughter of the Regiment, 1953		Georg C. Klaren
La forza del destino	Giuseppe Verdi	Francesco Maria Piave	The Force of Destiny, 1950		Carmine Gallone
La forza del destino	Giuseppe Verdi	Francesco Maria Piave	A Time of Destiny, 1988		
Der Freischütz	Carl Maria von Weber	Johann Friedrich Kind	Magic Hunter, 1994		Ildikó Enyedi
El gato montés	Manuel Penella	Manuel Penella	El gato montés, 1936		Rosario Pi
Griffelkin	Lukas Foss	Alastair Reid	H-E Double Hockey Sticks, 1999		Randall Miller
Hansel and Gretel	Engelbert Humperdinck	Adelheid Wette	Hansel and Gretel: An Opera Fantasy, 1954		John Paul
Halka	Stanisław Moniuszko	Włodzimierz Wolski	Halka, 1930		Konstanty Meglicki
Halka	Stanisław Moniuszko	Włodzimierz Wolski	Halka, 1937		Juliusz Gardan
Háry János	Zoltán Kodály	Béla Paulini; Zsolt Harsányi	Háry János, 1941		Frigyes Bán
Háry János	Zoltán Kodály	Béla Paulini; Zsolt Harsányi	Háry János, 1965		Miklós Szinetár
Khovanshchina	Modest Mussorgsky	Modest Mussorgsky	Khovanshchina, 1959		Vera Stroyeva
Lady Macbeth of Mtsensk	Dmitri Shostakovich	Alexander Preys; Dmitri Shostakovich	Katerina Izmailova, 1966		Mikhail Shapiro
Louise	Gustave Charpentier	Gustave Charpentier	Louise, 1939		Abel Gance
Macbeth	Giuseppe Verdi	Francesco Maria Piave; Andrea Maffei	Macbeth, 1987		Claude d'Anna
Madama Butterfly	Giacomo Puccini	Luigi Illica; Giuseppe Giacosa	The Toll of the Sea, 1922		Chester M. Franklin
Madama Butterfly	Giacomo Puccini	Luigi Illica; Giuseppe Giacosa	Madame Butterfly, 1932		Marion Gering
Madama Butterfly	Giacomo Puccini	Luigi Illica; Giuseppe Giacosa	Madame Butterfly, 1954		Carmine Gallone
Madama Butterfly	Giacomo Puccini	Luigi Illica; Giuseppe Giacosa	M. Butterfly, 1993		David Cronenberg
Madama Butterfly	Giacomo Puccini	Luigi Illica; Giuseppe Giacosa	Madame Butterfly, 1995		Frédéric Mitterrand
The Magic Flute	Wolfgang Amadeus Mozart	Emanuel Schikaneder	The Magic Flute, 1975		Ingmar Bergman
The Magic Flute	Wolfgang Amadeus Mozart	Emanuel Schikaneder	The Magic Flute, 2006		Kenneth Branagh
The Magic Flute	Wolfgang Amadeus Mozart	Emanuel Schikaneder	Magic Flute Diaries, 2008		Kevin Sullivan
The Magic Flute	Wolfgang Amadeus Mozart	Emanuel Schikaneder	The Magic Flute, 2022		Florian Sigl
The Marriage of Figaro	Wolfgang Amadeus Mozart	Lorenzo Da Ponte	The Marriage of Figaro, 1949		Georg Wildhagen
The Marriage of Figaro	Wolfgang Amadeus Mozart	Lorenzo Da Ponte	The Marriage of Figaro, 1960		Alan Burke
The Medium	Gian Carlo Menotti	Gian Carlo Menotti	The Medium, 1951		Gian Carlo Menotti
The Merry Wives of Windsor	Otto Nicolai	Salomon Hermann Mosenthal	The Merry Wives of Windsor, 1950		Georg Wildhagen
Die Meistersinger von Nürnberg	Richard Wagner	Richard Wagner	Der Meister von Nürnberg, 1927		Ludwig Berger
Mignon	Ambroise Thomas	Jules Barbier; Michel Carré	Mignon, 1915		William Nigh
The Mikado	Arthur Sullivan	W. S. Gilbert	The Mikado, 1939		Victor Schertzinger
The Mikado	Arthur Sullivan	W. S. Gilbert	The Cool Mikado, 1963		Michael Winner
The Mikado	Arthur Sullivan	W. S. Gilbert	The Mikado, 1967		Stuart Burge
Moses und Aron	Arnold Schoenberg	Arnold Schoenberg	Moses und Aron, 1975		Jean-Marie Straub and Danièle Huillet
La muette de Portici	Daniel Auber	Germain Delavigne; Eugène Scribe	The Dumb Girl of Portici, 1916		Lois Weber and Phillips Smalley
La muette de Portici	Daniel Auber	Germain Delavigne; Eugène Scribe	The Mute of Portici, 1922		Arthur Günsburg
La muette de Portici	Daniel Auber	Germain Delavigne; Eugène Scribe	The Mute of Portici, 1952		Giorgio Ansoldi
Natalka Poltavka	Mykola Lysenko		Natalka Poltavka, 1936		Ivan Kavaleridze
The Nose	Dmitri Shostakovich	Dmitri Shostakovich; Yevgeny Zamyatin; Georgy Ionin; Alexander Preys	The Nose or the Conspiracy of Mavericks, 2020		Andrei Khrzhanovsky
Otello	Giuseppe Verdi	Arrigo Boito	Otello, 1906		Mario Caserini; Gaston Velle
Otello	Giuseppe Verdi	Arrigo Boito	Otello, 1986		Franco Zeffirelli
Pagliacci	Ruggero Leoncavallo	Ruggero Leoncavallo	I Pagliacci, 1915		Francesco Bertolini
Pagliacci	Ruggero Leoncavallo	Ruggero Leoncavallo	I Pagliacci, 1923		G. B. Samuelson; S. W. Smith
Pagliacci	Ruggero Leoncavallo	Ruggero Leoncavallo	Pagliacci, 1931		Joe W. Coffman
Pagliacci	Ruggero Leoncavallo	Ruggero Leoncavallo	Pagliacci, 1936		Karl Grune
Pagliacci	Ruggero Leoncavallo	Ruggero Leoncavallo	Pagliacci, 1948		Mario Costa
Pagliacci	Ruggero Leoncavallo	Ruggero Leoncavallo	Pagliacci, 1982		Franco Zeffirelli
Parsifal	Richard Wagner	Richard Wagner	Parsifal, 1904		Edwin S. Porter
Parsifal	Richard Wagner	Richard Wagner	The Evil Forest, 1951		Daniel Mangrané
Parsifal	Richard Wagner	Richard Wagner	Parsifal, 1982		Hans-Jürgen Syberberg
Les pêcheurs de perles	Georges Bizet	Eugène Cormon; Michel Carré	The Pearl Fishers, 1963		William Sterling
The Pirates of Penzance	Arthur Sullivan	W. S. Gilbert	The Pirate Movie, 1982		Ken Annakin
The Pirates of Penzance	Arthur Sullivan	W. S. Gilbert	The Pirates of Penzance, 1983		Wilford Leach
Porgy and Bess	George Gershwin	DuBose Heyward	Porgy and Bess, 1959		Otto Preminger
Le postillon de Lonjumeau	Adolphe Adam	Adolphe de Leuven; Léon Lévy Brunswick	The Postman from Longjumeau, 1936		Carl Lamac
Prince Igor	Alexander Borodin	Alexander Borodin	Prince Igor, 1969		Roman Tikhomirov
The Queen of Spades	Pyotr Ilyich Tchaikovsky	Modest Tchaikovsky	The Queen of Spades, 1960		Roman Tikhomirov
Das Rheingold	Richard Wagner	Richard Wagner	Das Rheingold, 1978		Ernst Wild
Das Rheingold	Richard Wagner	Richard Wagner	Das Rheingold, 1995		
Der Rosenkavalier	Richard Strauss	Hugo von Hofmannsthal	Der Rosenkavalier, 1926	1926	Robert Wiene
Rigoletto	Giuseppe Verdi	Francesco Maria Piave	The King's Jester	1941	Mario Bonnard
Rigoletto	Giuseppe Verdi	Francesco Maria Piave	Rigoletto	1956	Flavio Calzavara
Rigoletto	Giuseppe Verdi	Francesco Maria Piave	Rigoletto	1982	Jean-Pierre Ponnelle
Rigoletto	Giuseppe Verdi	Francesco Maria Piave	Rigoletto	1993	Feature Films for Families
Rigoletto	Giuseppe Verdi	Francesco Maria Piave	Rick	2003	Curtiss Clayton
Rigoletto	Giuseppe Verdi	Francesco Maria Piave	Giuseppe Verdi's Rigoletto Story,	2005	Gianfranco Fozzi
Rigoletto	Giuseppe Verdi	Francesco Maria Piave	Rigoletto... in Bluegrass,	2006	Rob Swales
Rita	Gaetano Donizetti	Gustave Vaëz	Rita		
I vespri siciliani	Giuseppe Verdi	Eugène Scribe; Charles Duveyrier	Vespro siciliano	1949	Giorgio Pastina
The Tales of Hoffmann	Jacques Offenbach	Jules Barbier	The Tales of Hoffmann, 1923	1923	Max Neufeld
The Tales of Hoffmann	Jacques Offenbach	Jules Barbier	The Tales of Hoffmann, 1951	1951	Michael Powell and Emeric Pressburger
Tiefland	Eugen d'Albert	Rudolf Lothar	Under the Mountains, 1920	1920	Béla Balogh
Tiefland	Eugen d'Albert	Rudolf Lothar	Tiefland, 1922	1922	Adolf E. Licho
Tiefland	Eugen d'Albert	Rudolf Lothar	Tiefland, 1954	1954	Leni Riefenstahl
Tosca	Giacomo Puccini	Luigi Illica; Giuseppe Giacosa	The Song of Hate, 1915	1915	J. Gordon Edwards
Tosca	Giacomo Puccini	Luigi Illica; Giuseppe Giacosa	Tosca, 1941	1941	Carl Koch
Tosca	Giacomo Puccini	Luigi Illica; Giuseppe Giacosa	Tosca, 1956	1956	Carmine Gallone
Tosca	Giacomo Puccini	Luigi Illica; Giuseppe Giacosa	Tosca, 2001	2001	Benoît Jacquot
La traviata	Giuseppe Verdi	Francesco Maria Piave	Camille	1936	George Cukor
La traviata	Giuseppe Verdi	Francesco Maria Piave	The Lady of the Camellias	1947	Carmine Gallone
La traviata	Giuseppe Verdi	Francesco Maria Piave	La traviata	1967	Mario Lanfranchi
La traviata	Giuseppe Verdi	Francesco Maria Piave	La Traviata	1982	Franco Zeffirelli
The Tsar's Bride	Nikolai Rimsky-Korsakov	Ilia Tyumenev	The Tsar's Bride	1965	Vladimir Gorikker
La Wally	Alfredo Catalani	Luigi Illica	La Wally	1932	Guido Brignone
Zar und Zimmermann	Albert Lortzing	Albert Lortzing	The Czar and the Carpenter	1956	Hans Müller
Boris Godunov	Modest Mussorgsky	Modest Mussorgsky	Boris Godunov	2011	Vladimir Mirzoev

== Rock operas ==
This is a list of feature films based on rock operas.

Opera	Music	Lyrics	Film	Film director
Jesus Christ Superstar, 1970	Andrew Lloyd Webber	Tim Rice	Jesus Christ Superstar, 1973	Norman Jewison
Quadrophenia, 1973	The Who	The Who	Quadrophenia, 1979	Franc Roddam
Tommy, 1969	The Who	The Who	Tommy, 1975	Ken Russell
The Wall, 1979	Pink Floyd	Pink Floyd	Pink Floyd – The Wall, 1982	Alan Parker

== Other opera films ==
This is a list of other opera or opera based films.

- Aria, 1987
- Meeting Venus, 1992, directed by István Szabó
- Opéra imaginaire, 1993
- Topsy-Turvy, 1999, directed by Mike Leigh

== See also ==
- Lists of film source material
- Opera film
- Operetta film
