= Opera film =

Recording of an opera on film

The opera film or opera-film is a film genre in which an opera is the subject of the entire film, as opposed to a film which only incorporates opera scenes or elements. It is a subgenre of the musical film. Opera films are usually based on established, well-known works; less frequently they showcase new operas, such as Tommy (1975), which is based on The Who's 1969 rock opera album Tommy.

The idea of presenting operas on film goes back to the very beginnings of cinema; Thomas Edison, who made major contributions to making and making available to the public films in the infancy of moviemaking, told The New York Times in 1893 that his goal was "to have such a happy combination of photography and electricity that a man can sit in his own parlor, see depicted upon a curtain the forms of the players in opera upon a distant stage and hear the voices of the singers."

The first opera film was a two-minute production of La fille du régiment (The Daughter of the Regiment), based on the 1840 work by Gaetano Donizetti, which premiered in New York City in July 1898. In the silent film era, music was performed live by orchestras and pianists. Major opera singers appeared in these films; for example Enrico Caruso and Pol Plançon appeared in a 1911 short, a scene from Lucia di Lammermoor, as Edgardo and Raimundo.

In July 1930, German and Austrian film companies agreed to divide up the opera field, with the former receiving exclusive rights to works by Richard Wagner and the latter receiving everything else.

The first sound opera film was Pagliacci (1931). Films about operas in general lost some popularity in the 1930s, but revived in the '40s and more so in the '50s.

== Selected filmography ==
Film	Film year	Opera	Composer	Director
Aida	1953	Aida	Giuseppe Verdi	Clemente Fracassi
Andrea Chénier	1955	Andrea Chénier	Umberto Giordano	Clemente Fracassi
The Barber of Seville	1947	The Barber of Seville	Gioachino Rossini	Mario Costa
The Barber of Seville	1948	The Barber of Seville	Gioachino Rossini	Jean Loubignac
The Bartered Bride	1932	The Bartered Bride	Bedřich Smetana	Max Ophüls
La Bohème	1965	La bohème	Giacomo Puccini	Franco Zeffirelli
La Bohème	1988	La bohème	Giacomo Puccini	Luigi Comencini
Carmen	1984	Carmen	Georges Bizet	Francesco Rosi
Cavalleria rusticana	1982	Cavalleria rusticana	Pietro Mascagni	Franco Zeffirelli
Don Giovanni	1979	Don Giovanni	Wolfgang Amadeus Mozart	Joseph Losey
The Force of Destiny	1950	La forza del destino	Giuseppe Verdi	Carmine Gallone
The Lady of the Camellias	1947	La traviata	Giuseppe Verdi	Carmine Gallone
Madame Butterfly	1954	Madama Butterfly	Giacomo Puccini	Carmine Gallone
The Magic Flute	1975	The Magic Flute	Wolfgang Amadeus Mozart	Ingmar Bergman
The Magic Flute	2006	The Magic Flute	Wolfgang Amadeus Mozart	Kenneth Branagh
The Magic Flute	2022	The Magic Flute	Wolfgang Amadeus Mozart	Florian Sigl
Otello	1986	Otello	Giuseppe Verdi	Franco Zeffirelli
Pagliacci	1948	Pagliacci	Ruggero Leoncavallo	Mario Costa
Pagliacci	1982	Pagliacci	Ruggero Leoncavallo	Franco Zeffirelli
Parsifal	1904	Parsifal	Richard Wagner	Edwin S. Porter
Porgy and Bess	1959	Porgy and Bess	George Gershwin	Otto Preminger
Rigoletto	1982	Rigoletto	Giuseppe Verdi	Jean-Pierre Ponnelle
The Tales of Hoffmann	1951	The Tales of Hoffmann	Jacques Offenbach	Michael Powell; Emeric Pressburger
Tosca	1956	Tosca	Giacomo Puccini	Carmine Gallone
La Traviata	1982	La traviata	Giuseppe Verdi	Franco Zeffirelli

== See also ==
- List of films based on operas
