= Afro Poli =

Italian opera singer

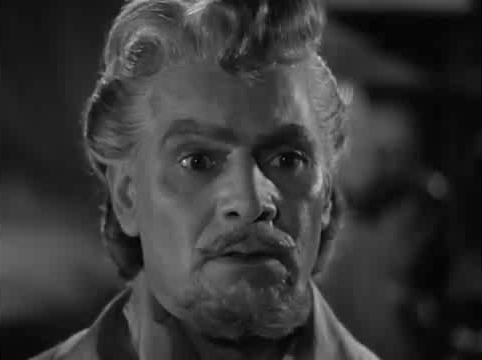
- Afro Poli, Love and Poison, 1950
- Born: 22 December 1902; Pisa, Italy
- Died: 22 February 1988 (aged 85); Rome, Italy
- Occupation: operatic baritone
- Years active: 1927–1978

Afro Poli (22 December 1902 – 22 February 1988) was an Italian operatic baritone, particularly associated with the Italian repertory.

== Life and career ==
Photo with dedication of Afro Poli in Carmina Burana, Teatro alla Scala, Milan, 1945.

Poli began his vocal studies when he joined the "Società Corale Pisana" in 1925, where he was a pupil of Bruno Pizzi. He made his stage debut in 1927 at the Teatro Verdi in Pisa, as Germont. He then went to Milan to further his studies with Gino Neri, and later joined the Teatro dell'Opera di Roma in 1930.

He was a leading baritone at La Scala in Milan from 1937 to 1955, where he sang in a wide repertoire from Mozart to verismo, including; Le nozze di Figaro, Così fan tutte, Il barbiere di Siviglia, Lucia di Lammermoor, Rigoletto, Simon Boccanegra, L'amico Fritz, Manon Lescaut, La bohème, Tosca, Adriana Lecouvreur, as well as Italian versions of operas such as; Les pêcheurs de perles, Manon, Werther, etc.

Along with the La Scala company, he made guest appearances in Berlin and Munich in 1946. He also appeared in Paris, London, Madrid, Lisbon and Buenos Aires. He was a guest at the Holland Festival and the Wexford Festival in the 1950s.

He was also very active on Italian Radio and Television (RAI), primarily in a production of Madama Butterfly, in 1956, with two then unknown beginners, Anna Moffo and Renato Cioni, which has been recently released on DVD. He can also be heard on disc in complete recordings of L'elisir d'amore, Don Pasquale, and Pagliacci.

Poli enjoyed a long career singing until 1969, when he then turned to teaching, first in Ankara and later in Melbourne. He gave his last performance in Adelaide, as Rodolfo in La Sonnambula in 1978.

== Discography ==
Recordings in 78 RPM. and 33 RPM.

- Augusto Rotoli – Mia sposa sarà la mia bandiera, Visione veneziana – orchestra diretta da Carlo Sabajno – Grammofono n° R-10812, matricola OM-682/II e OM-683/II, 78 RPM
- Afro Poli – Recital. Arie da Opere e romanze – Timaclub n° Tima 75, reg. 1932–1954 (anche inedite), 33 RPM

Complete Operas

- 1932 – Donizetti, Don Pasquale – Schipa, Badini, Saraceni, Poli, Callegari – Dir. Sabajno – La voce del padrone SQSO 53/55 e QUALP 10121 – Riversamento in microsolco – Issued in 78 RPM – N° Catalogo 78 RPM 10410/24. On CD: Opera d'Oro n°1224 Mono 2CD.
- 1938 – Puccini, Turandot – Merli, Cigna, Olivero, Poli, Neroni – Dir. Ghione – Cetra 2066/81 78 RPM. Riversamento in Microsolco del 1951. 33 RPM Cetra XTLP 1206/3
- 1938 – Mascagni, Cavalleria rusticana – Rasa, Meloni, Melandri, Poli, Toscani – Dir. Mascagni – Orchestra e Coro dell'Opera Italiana d'Olanda – Teatro dell'Aja, Live Rec. 7 November 1938 – In CD Bongiovanni Bologna (GB 1005-2 – AAD) e Guild (n°2241 – 2CD).
- 1938 – Puccini, La bohème – Gigli, Albanese, Menotti, Poli, Baracchi – Dir. Berrettoni – La voce del padrone QALP 10077/8 – Issued in 78 RPM.. N° Catalogo 78 RPM MMV.D.B. 3448/60. – Riversamento in Microsolco del 1955, HMV-EMI.
- 1942 – Verdi, Falstaff – Stabile, Poli, Nessi, Donaggio – Dir. Erede – Orchestra del Teatro alla Scala di Milano – Telefunken GX-61009, Matrice M.DO-26637/38, 1942.
- 1950 – Donizetti – Don Pasquale – Corena, Poli, Lazzari, Gatta – Dir. Armando La Rosa Parodi – Coro e Orchestra della Scala di Milano – 2LP URLP 228 Urania.
- 1951 – Rossini, Il signor Bruschino – Bruscantini, Poli, Soley, Noni, Dalamangas – Dir. Giulini – Orchestra e Coro della RAI di Milano – Mono, (Milano, 9/24 September 1951) – In CD: Gop n°66329 DDD, Melodram n°50046 ADD e Walhall E.Series ADD.
- 1951 – Mascagni, L'amico Fritz – Rina Gigli, Beniamino Gigli, Poli, Pirazzini – Dir. Gavazzeni – Orchestra e Coro del Teatro S.Carlo di Napoli – In CD Archipel n. 19 2CD AAD.
- 1951 – Donizetti, Don Pasquale – Corena, Poli, La Gatta, Lazzari – Dir. La Rosa Parodi – Orchestra e Coro della Scala di Milano – Urania URLP 228 (2-CD Set).
- 1952 – Donizetti, L'elisir d'amore – Valletti, Noni, Bruscantini, Poli – Dir. Gavazzeni – orchestra e Coro della RAI di Roma – Cetra LPC 1235 – Ristampa Cetra L.P.S. 3235 del 1968. Ristampa on CD Fonit-Cetra Records, 2CD.
- 1952 – Scarlatti, Il trionfo dell'onore – Berdini, Pini, Poli, Borriello, Zerbini, Zareska – Dir. Giulini – Orchestra della RAI di Milano – Cetra LPC 1223. In CD: Urania n. 277 1CD (2005).
- 1952 – Massenet, Manon – Carteri, Prandelli, Clabassi, Poli – Dir. Gui – orchestra e Coro della RAI di Milano – In CD Gop n. 66323 2CD.
- 1953 – Leoncavallo, Pagliacci – Del Monaco, Petrella, Protti – Dir. Erede – Orchestra e Coro di S. Cecilia – Decca LXT 2845/46 – Issued in 33 RPM – Ristampa in CD Mono Urania (2006) e Gop (2005).
- 1956 – Malipiero, Giulio Cesare – Bertocci, Colzani, Barbesi, Mazzini, Capecchi, Cattelani, Angioletti, Mercuriali, Poli, Meletti – Dir. Sanzogno – Orchestra e Coro della RAI di Milano – Live – 8 July 1956 – In CD Gop ADD – 2CD.
- 1956 – Puccini, Madama Butterfly – Anna Moffo, Renato Cioni, Poli, Truccato Pace – Dir. Oliviero De Fabritiis – Orchestra e Coro della RAI di Milano – In CD Gop ADD – 2CD (See Video).
- 1957 – Puccini, Turandot – Filippeschi, Noli, Poli, Catania – Dir. V.Bellezza – Coro e Orchestra del Teatro S.Carlo di Napoli – Live, 27 July 1957 Arena Flegrea di Napoli.
- 1961 – Mascagni, Le Maschere – De Muro Lomanto, Cassinelli, Berdini, Tedesco, Poli, Rizzieri, Broggini, Ferrari, Malaspina, Borgioli, Taccani – Dir. Bartoletti – Orchestra e Coro del Teatro Verdi di Trieste – Live – In CD Gala n°731 – 2CD – AAD
- 1961 – Mascagni, Il Piccolo Marat – Rossi-Lemeni, Zeani, Borsò, Rota, Poli – Pizzi (M° del Coro) – Dir. O.De Fabritiis – Live, 26 October 1961 Livorno La Gran Guardia – FONE' 88 F 17–37 (2 CD)
- 1962 – Mascagni, Il Piccolo Marat – Rossi-Lemeni, Zeani, Gismondo, Fioravanti, Poli – Pizzi (M° del Coro) – Dir. O. Ziino – Live, San Remo 20 January 1962 – FONIT CETRA CDON 47 (2 CD).

== Filmography ==
Year	Film	Director
1956	Mi permette babbo?	Mario Bonnard
1958	the labors of hercules	Pietro Francisci
1963	La cieca di Sorrento	Nick Nostro

== Operas on Film ==
- 1946 - Donizetti, Lucia di Lammermoor – Mario Filippeschi, Nelly Corradi, Afro Poli, L. Di Lelio, – Black and white film directed by P. Ballerini.
- 1948 – Rossini, Cenerentola – Lori Randi (Angelina, sung by mezzo-soprano Fedora Barbieri) – Gino Del Signore (Don Ramiro) – Afro Poli (Dandini) – Vito De Taranto (Don Magnifico) – Franca Tamantini (Tisbe, sung by Fernanda Cadoni Azzolini) – Orchestra and chorus of the Teatro dell'Opera di Roma conducted by Oliviero De Fabritiis – directed by Fernando Cerchio.
- 1948 – Leoncavallo, I Pagliacci – Afro Poli (Canio, sung by Galliano Masini), Gina Lollobrigida, Tito Gobbi (in the guise of both Tonio and Silvio) – black and white film - directed by Mario Costa
- 1953 - Verdi, Aida – Sofia Loren (sung by Renata Tebaldi), Afro Poli (sung by Gino Bechi) – black and white film was coloured in 2005. VHS (black and white) and DVD (color)
- 1956 – Puccini, Madama Butterfly – Anna Moffo, Renato Cioni, Afro Poli – Conducted by Oliviero De Fabritiis – Orchestra and chorus of RAI di Milano – black and white – DVD Video Artists Int'l, 4284.
- 1956 – Puccini, Tosca – Franco Corelli, Franca Duval, Afro Poli (Baron Scarpia, sung by Giangiacomo Guelfi). Conducted by Oliviero De Fabritiis – directed by Carmine Gallone.
- 1967 – Verdi, La Traviata – Anna Moffo, Franco Bonisolli, Afro Poli (sung by Gino Bechi) – directed by Mario Lanfranchi – Italia, 1967 – Duration ca. 90 minutes
