= Pagliacci (disambiguation) =

Pagliacci (English: Clowns) is an opera written and composed by Ruggero Leoncavallo, that premiered in 1892.

Pagliacci or I Pagliacci (English: The Clowns) may also refer to:

- Adaptations of Leoncavallo's opera:
  - I Pagliacci (1915 film), a silent Italian film based on the opera
  - I Pagliacci (1923 film), a silent British film based on the opera
  - Pagliacci (1931 film), an American-made Italian-language film based on the opera
  - Pagliacci (1936 film), a 1936 British-Italian film based on the opera
  - Pagliacci (1948 film), a 1948 Italian film based on the opera
  - Pagliacci (1982 film), a 1982 Italian film based on the opera
- Pagliacci, a long-standing joke that exemplifies the Sad clown paradox
- Pagliacci Pizza, a Seattle-based chain of restaurants
