= Ivan Gyngazov =

Russian opera singer (born 1987)

Ivan Gynzanov
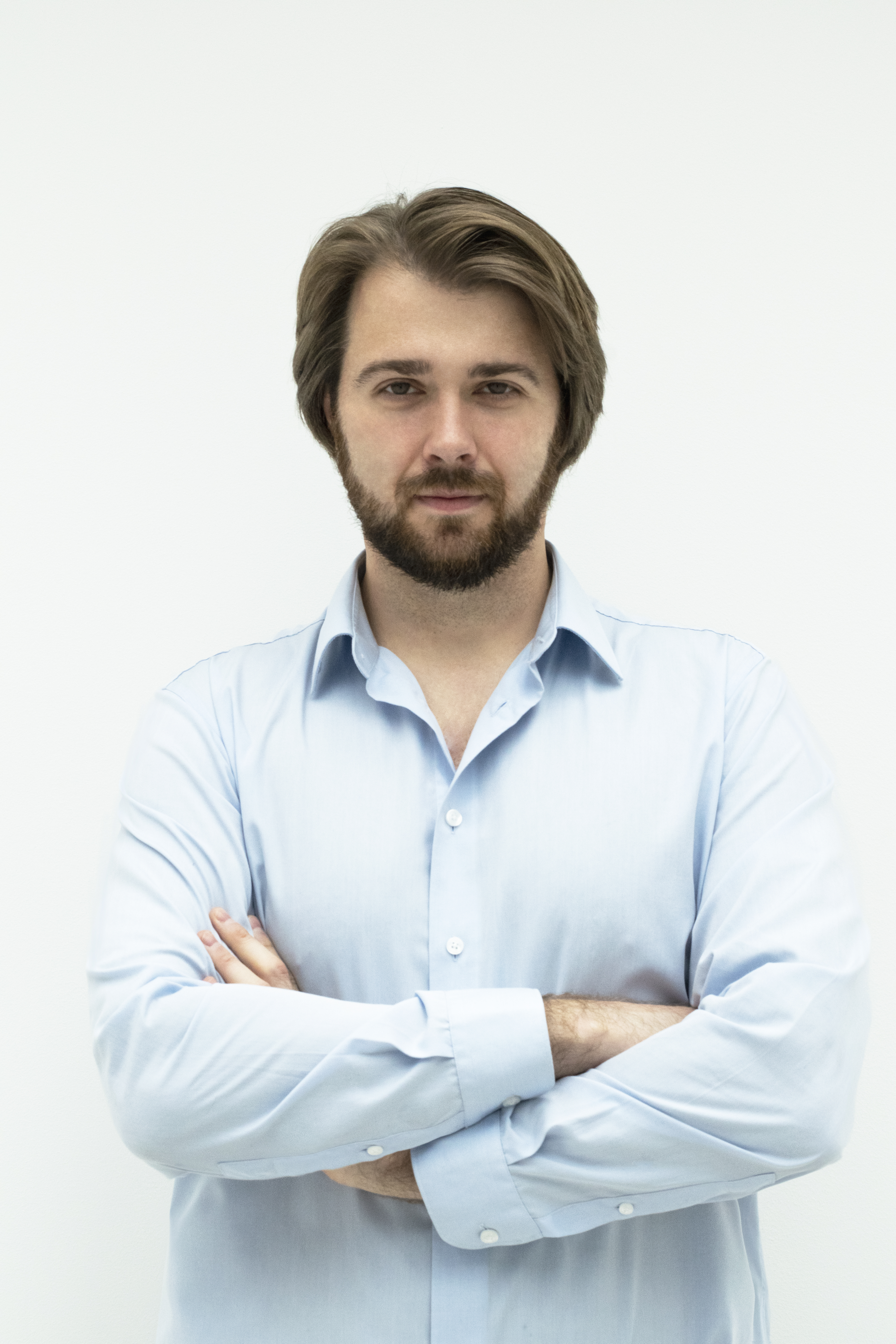

Background information
- Born: October 6, 1987 (age 38); Novosibirsk, USSR
- Occupation: Opera singer
- Years active: 2013-present

Ivan Sergeevich Gyngazov (Russian: Иван Сергеевич Гынгазов; born 6 October 1987, Novosibirsk) is a Russian opera singer (tenor), laureate of international competitions, leading soloist of the Helikon Opera, and a guest soloist of the Marlinsky Theatre and Bolshoi Theatre.

== Biography ==
In 2020, Gyngazov became a guest soloist at the Bolshoi Theatre, performing the role of Sadko in the opera of the same name by N. A. Rimsky-Korsakov (directed by D. Chernakov).

In December 2023, the opera Samson and Delilah by K. Sen-Sans was performed at the Auditorio de Tenerife with the participation of Gyngazov.

In May 2025, Gyngazov made his debut in the Bavarian State Opera with the role of Turridu in the opera Cavalleria Rusticana by P. Mascagni.
