= The Nose (opera) =

1928 opera by Dmitri Shostakovich

- Satirical opera by Dmitri Shostakovich
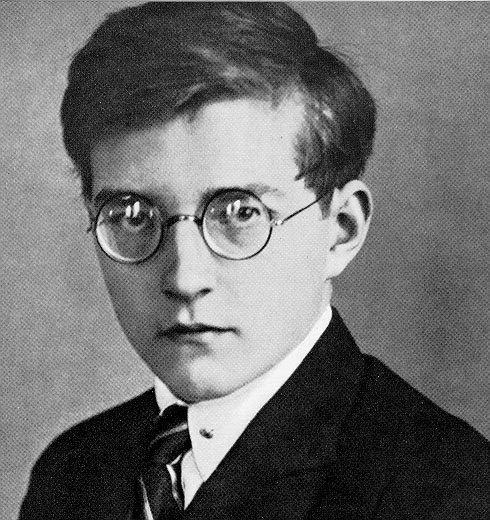
- The composer in 1925
- Native title: Нос
- Librettist: Shostakovich; Yevgeny Zamyatin; Georgy Ionin; Alexander Preis
- Language: Russian
- Based on: "The Nose" by Nikolai Gogol
- Premiere: 18 January 1930; Leningrad Maly Operny

The Nose, Op. 15, (Russian: Нос, romanized: Nos) is Dmitri Shostakovich's first opera, a satirical work completed in 1928 based on Nikolai Gogol's 1836 story of the same name.

== Style and structure ==
The opera was written between 1927 and 1928. The libretto is by Shostakovich, Yevgeny Zamyatin, Georgy Ionin, and Alexander Preis. Shostakovich stated it was a satire on the times of Alexander I. The plot concerns a Saint Petersburg official whose nose leaves his face and develops a life of its own.

The libretto includes material borrowed from some other of Gogol's works, including "The Overcoat", Marriage, "Diary of a Madman", and Dead Souls; as well as The Brothers Karamazov (1881) by Dostoyevsky. (The Dostoyevsky material appears in act 2, scene 6, where Kovalyov returns home to find Ivan singing. The song is Shostakovich's setting of the words of part 2, book 5, chapter 2 of Karamazov, where the lackey, Smerdiakov, sings to his neighbour Mariia Kondratevna.

An invisible force ties to my beloved. Bless us, O Lord, her and me! Her and me! I'll give up a king's crown, if my beloved is happy. Bless us, O Lord, her and me! Her and me!)

Shostakovich uses a montage of different styles, including folk music, popular song, and atonality. The apparent chaos is given structure by formal musical devices such as canons and quartets, a device taken from Alban Berg's Wozzeck.

According to the British composer Gerard McBurney writing for Boosey & Hawkes, "The Nose is one of the young Shostakovich’s greatest masterpieces, an electrifying tour de force of vocal acrobatics, wild instrumental colours and theatrical absurdity, all shot through with a blistering mixture of laughter and rage.... The result, in Shostakovich's ruthlessly irreverent hands, is like an operatic version of Charlie Chaplin or Monty Python.... [D]espite its magnificently absurd subject and virtuosic music, The Nose is a perfectly practical work and provides a hugely entertaining evening in the theatre."

== Performance history ==
In June 1929, The Nose was given a concert performance, against Shostakovich's own wishes: "The Nose loses all meaning if it is seen just as a musical composition. For the music springs only from the action.... It is clear to me that a concert performance of The Nose will destroy it." The concert performance caused bewilderment and was attacked by the Russian Association of Proletarian Musicians (RAPM).

The original plan was to mount a stage production at the Bolshoi Theatre under the direction of Vsevolod Meyerhold, but this fell through because Meyerhold was occupied with other productions. The stage premiere, conducted by Samuil Samosud, took place at the Maly Operny Theatre in Leningrad on 18 January 1930. It opened to generally poor reviews and widespread incomprehension among musicians. Even so, the conductor Nikolai Malko, who had taught Shostakovich at the Leningrad Conservatory and conducted the premiere of his pupil's First Symphony, regarded the opera as a "tremendous success"; it was given sixteen performances with two alternating casts over six months.

The opera was not performed again in the Soviet Union until 1974, when it was revived in Moscow by Gennady Rozhdestvensky and Boris Pokrovsky. Interviewed for a 2008 documentary, Rozhdestvensky related that he had found an old copy of The Nose in the Bolshoi Theatre in 1974, supposedly the last copy in the Soviet Union. The composer attended the rehearsal and premiere in 1974.

The Nose was given its Italian premiere on 23 May 1964 by the Maggio Musicale Fiorentino at the Teatro della Pergola in Florence. The cast included Renato Capecchi as Platon Kuzmich Kovalyov, Italo Tajo as Ivan Yakovlevich, Antonio Pirino as the Nose, Cesy Broggini as Pelageya Grigoryevna Podtochina and Jolanda Meneguzzer as Podtochina's daughter. It was conducted by Bruno Bartoletti and directed by Eduardo De Filippo, with set designs by Mino Maccari. It was the first performance in Europe since the 1930 stage premiere in Leningrad.

The opera received its United States professional premiere at the Santa Fe Opera in 1965, conducted by Erich Kunzel, and was performed again by the Santa Fe company in 1987, conducted by Edo de Waart. It was performed in July 2004 at Bard College's SummerScape in Annandale-on-Hudson, New York, directed by Francesca Zambello and performed by the American Symphony Orchestra conducted by Leon Botstein.

A new Russian production was mounted at the Mariinsky Theatre in Saint Petersburg in 2004, with Valery Gergiev as musical director and Yuri Alexandrov as stage director; the Mariinsky described it as the theatre's premiere of the work and the premiere of that production. The Mariinsky also notes that, before Alexandrov's production, the opera had been staged in Russia only at the Leningrad Maly Operny Theatre in 1930 and at Pokrovsky's Moscow Chamber Musical Theatre in 1974. The same Mariinsky production was later presented at the Opéra Bastille in Paris in 2005.

The opera was staged at Opera Boston in early 2009, and at the Metropolitan Opera in New York City in March 2010 in a production by the South African artist and director William Kentridge, conducted by Valery Gergiev and Pavel Smelkov. This production was revived in 2013 and was beamed to cinemas around the world as part of the Metropolitan Opera Live in HD programme on 26 October.

The Nose Live in HD, 2013

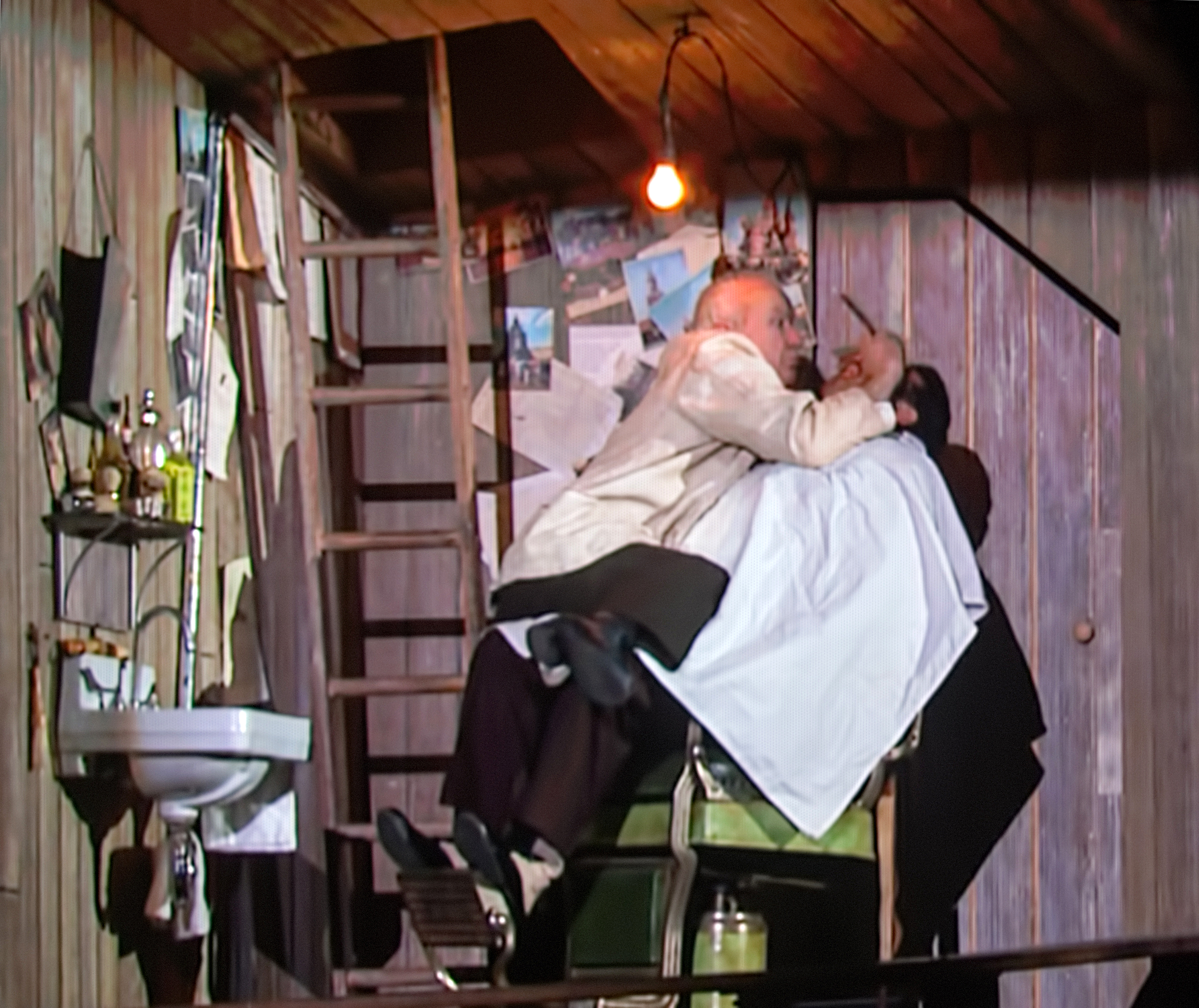

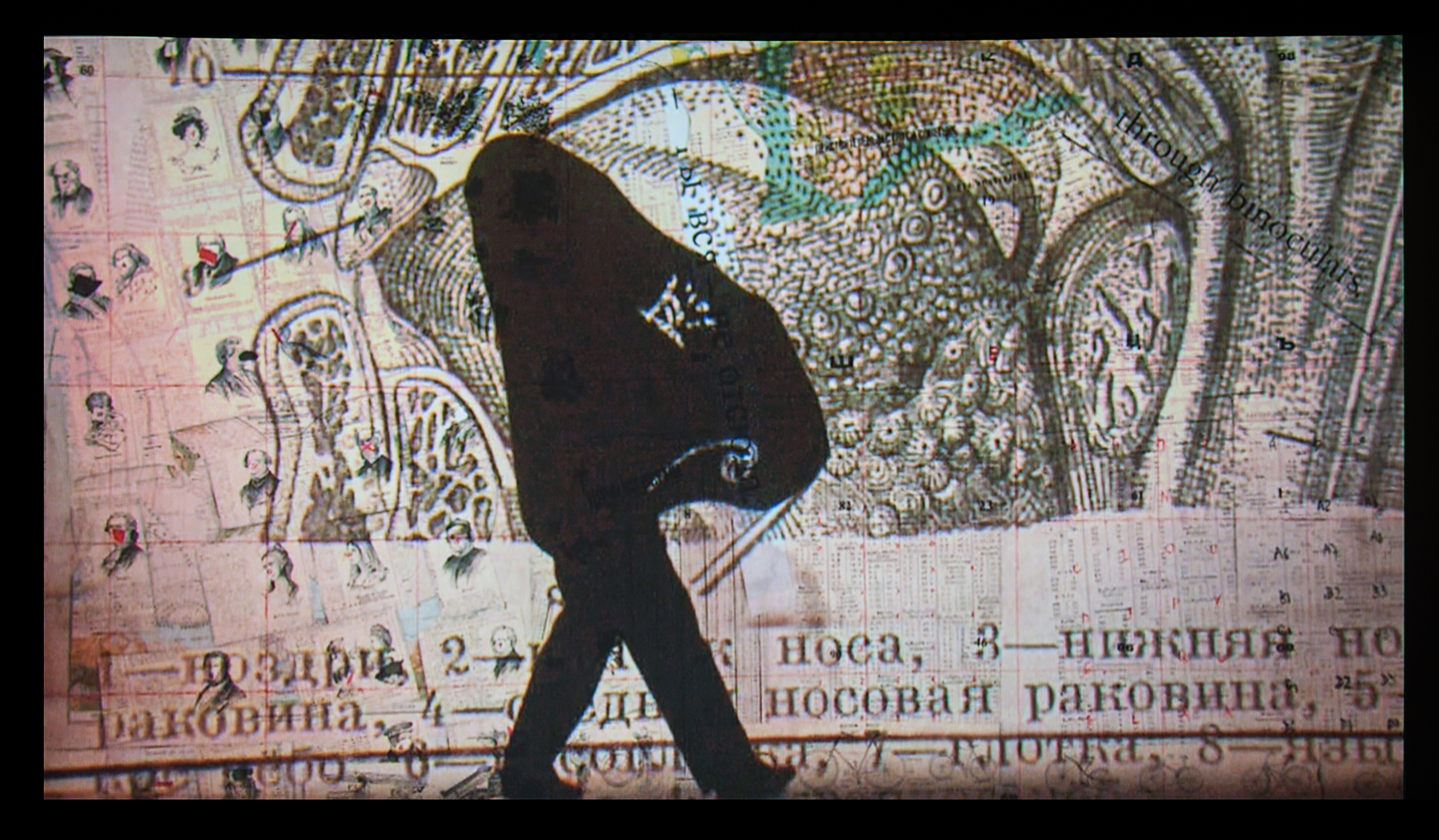

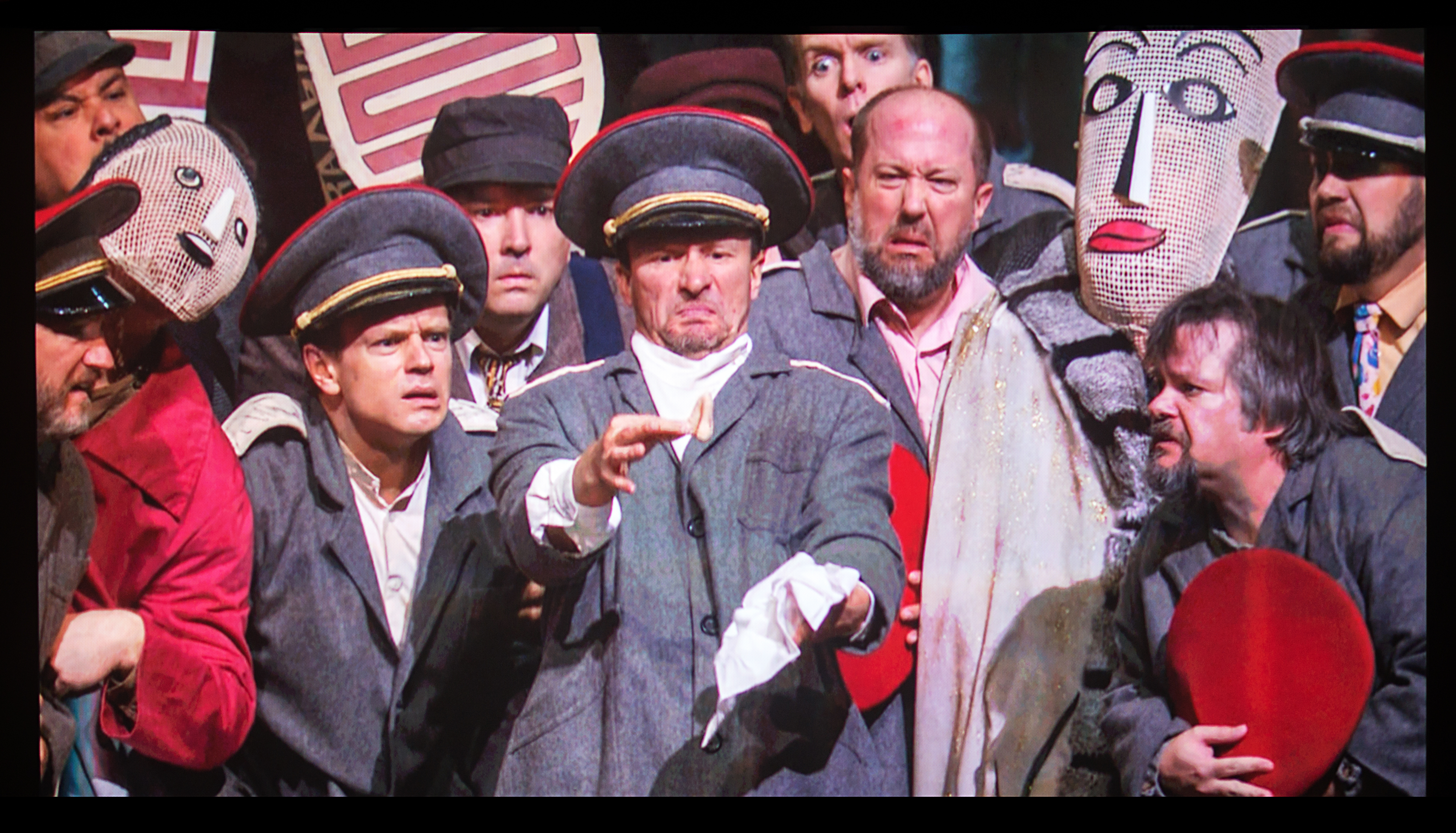

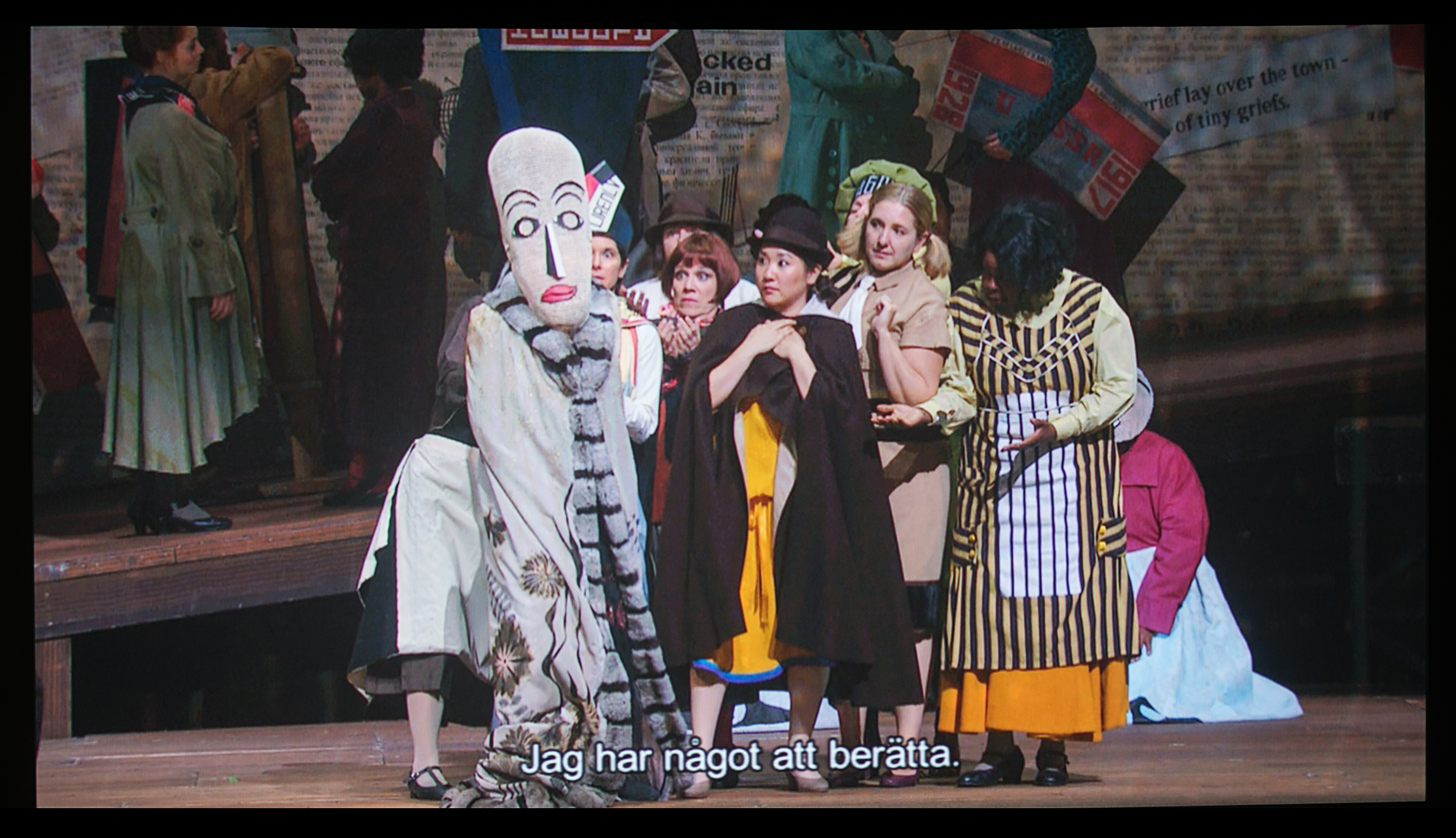

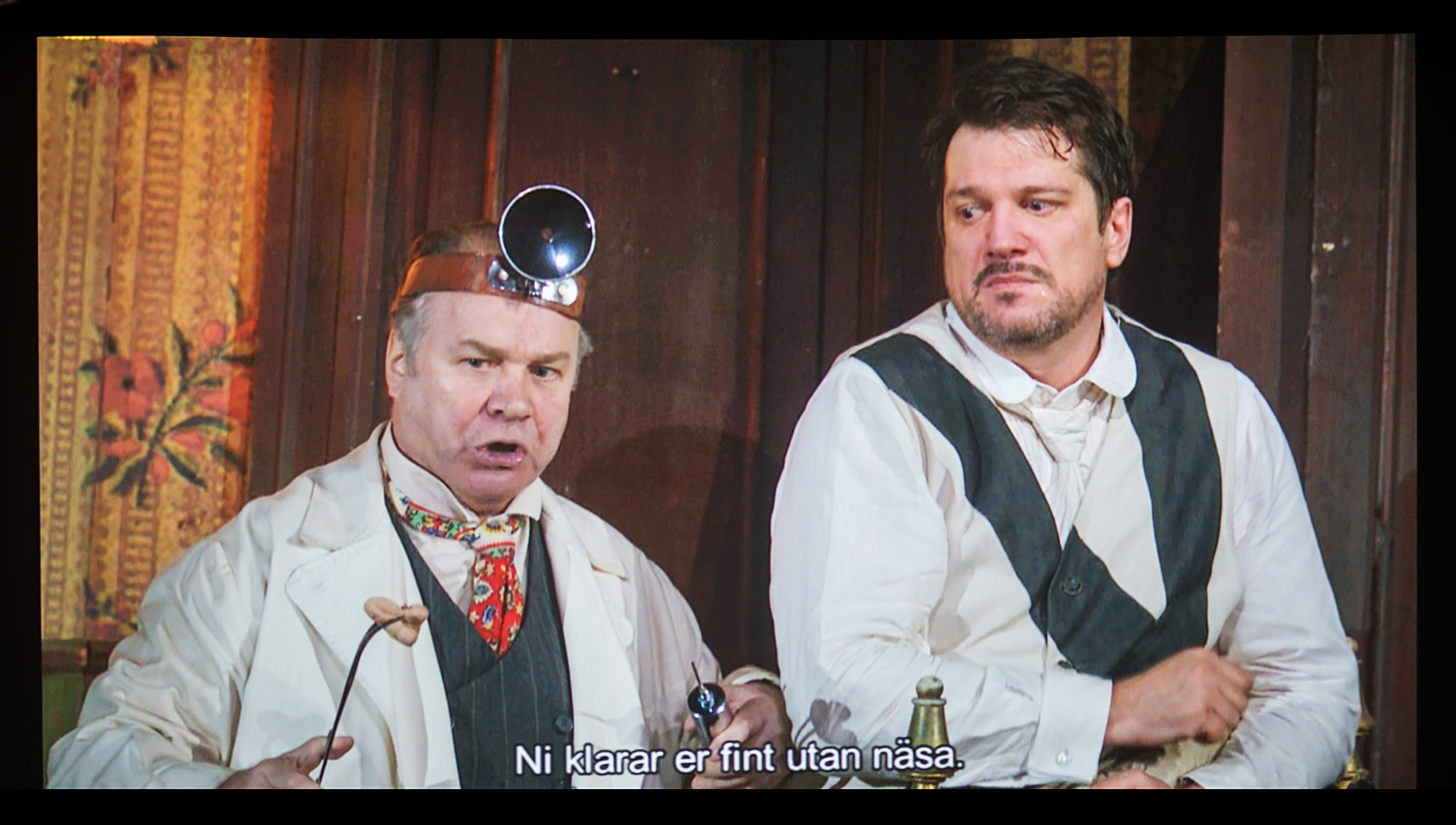

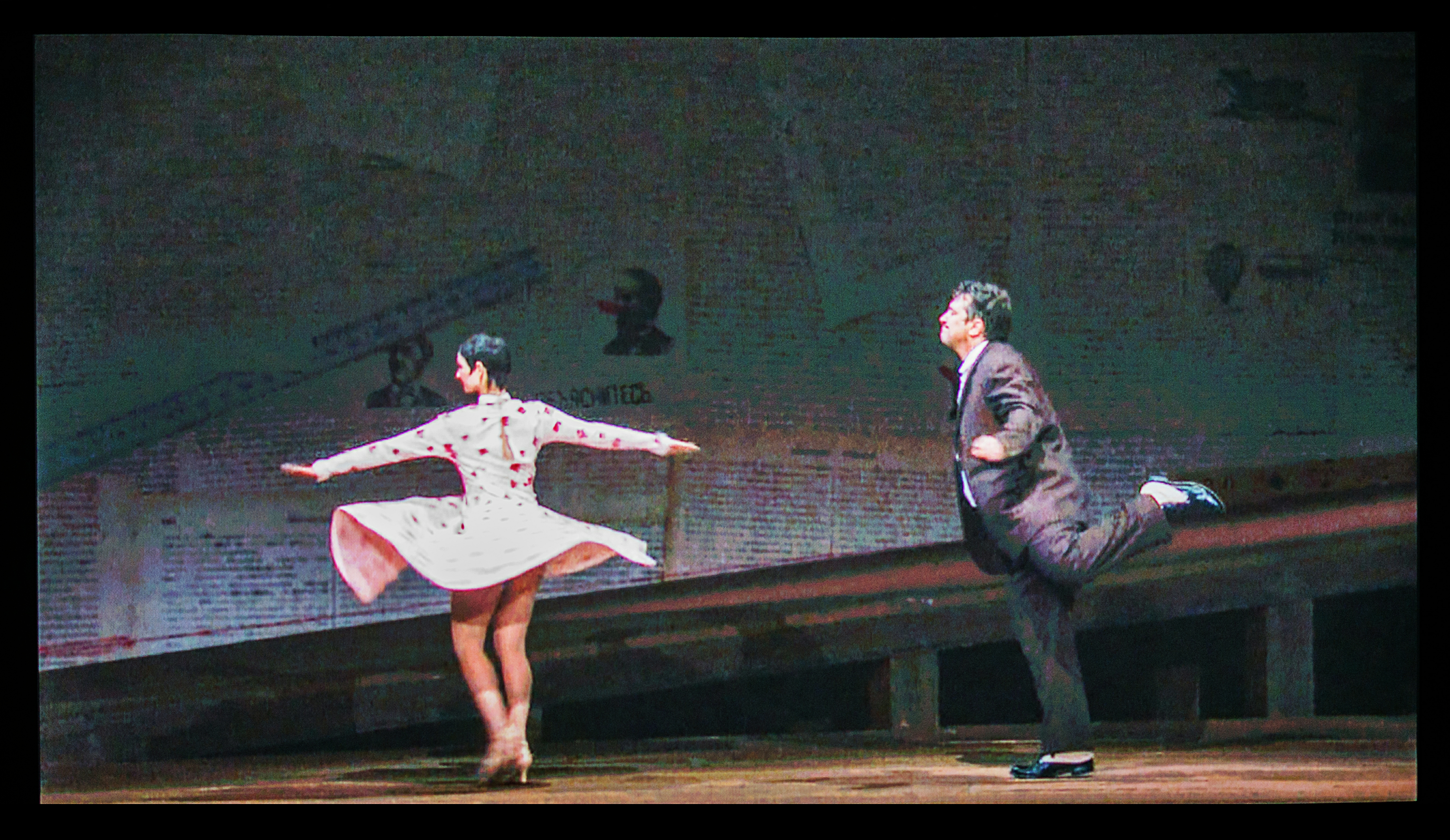

Kentridge's staging was also given in France: it appeared at the Festival d'Aix-en-Provence in July 2011, conducted by Kazushi Ono, and later that year at the Opéra de Lyon. In Bulgaria, the work was presented for the first time in March 2012 by the Ruse State Opera at the March Music Days festival. The production was staged by Adelaide Yakimova-Furnadzhieva and conducted by Nayden Todorov.

Barrie Kosky's production of a new English-language version by David Pountney for The Royal Opera, Opera Australia, and the Komische Oper Berlin premiered in 2016 at the Royal Opera House in London, with Ingo Metzmacher conducting; it was Kosky's debut at that house. The same production was presented by Opera Australia at the Sydney Opera House in 2018, and entered the repertory of the Komische Oper Berlin. Other 21st-century productions have included a 2021 staging at the Bavarian State Opera in Munich, directed by Kirill Serebrennikov and conducted by Vladimir Jurowski, and a 2023 production at the Teatro Real in Madrid, directed by Kosky and conducted by Mark Wigglesworth.

== Instrumentation ==
Shostakovich's score is written for the following:

Woodwinds: flute (doubling piccolo, alto flute), oboe (doubling cor anglais), B-flat clarinet (doubling piccolo clarinet, A clarinet, bass clarinet), bassoon (doubling contrabassoon)
Brass: horn, trumpet (doubling cornet), trombone
Percussion: triangle, tambourine, castanets, tom-tom, ratchet, suspended cymbal, clash cymbals, bass drum, snare drum, tam-tam, glockenspiel, tubular bells, xylophone, flexatone (musical saw)
Sound Effects: police whistle, gunshot, whacks (удары)
Keyboards: piano
Strings: violins I and II, violas, cellos, double basses, two harps, small domras, alto domras, two balalaikas

== Roles ==
The cast requires 82 singing/speaking parts, usually sung by about 14 performers.

Roles, voice types
Role	Voice type
Platon Kuzmich Kovalyov, a Collegiate Assessor	baritone
Ivan Yakovlevich, a barber	bass-baritone
Police Inspector	very high tenor
Ivan, Kovalyov's valet	tenor
The Nose	tenor
Pelagia Grigorievna Podtochina, a staff-officer's widow	mezzo-soprano
Her Daughter	soprano
The Old Countess	contralto
Praskovya Ossipovna, wife of Ivan Yakovlevich	soprano
A Bread-Seller	soprano
A Clerk in a Newspaper Office	bass-baritone
Iaryzhkin, a friend of Kovalyov's	tenor
Eight Footmen, Ten Policemen, Nine Gentlemen, Four Eunuchs, Passers-By, People at Coach Station, soprano solo in Kazan Cathedral, etc.

== Synopsis ==
Opera in 3 acts and 10 scenes, with one intermission after second act.

=== Act 1 ===
==== Prologue ====
St Petersburg. Kovalyov, a Collegiate Assessor, is being shaved by Ivan Yakovlevich, a barber. He is one of Yakovlevich's regular customers.

The next morning, Yakovlevich finds a nose in his bread. His wife, believing he has cut off one of his customers' noses, asks him to dispose of it. He tries to get rid of it in the street, but is foiled by running into people he knows. Then he throws it into the Neva River, but he is seen by a police officer and taken away for questioning. Meanwhile, Kovalyov wakes and finds his nose missing. His first reaction is disbelief, then shock, and he sets out to find it. He later sees his nose praying in the Kazan Cathedral, now the size of a human being. Since the nose has acquired a higher rank (State Councillor) than he, it refuses to have any dealings with him, and leaves.

=== Act 2 ===
In his search, Kovalyov finds himself at the Chief of Police's apartment, but he is not at home. Next he visits the newspaper office to place an advertisement about the loss of his nose, where they are dealing with a missing dog. After explaining his loss, his request is refused on the grounds of the newspaper's reputation. Upon demonstrating his loss, the clerk suggests he tell his story. Kovalyov feels insulted and leaves.

He returns to his apartment, where his servant is playing the balalaika; he dismisses him and wallows in self-pity.

Intermission follows the second act.

=== Act 3 ===
The police take up the search. A group of policemen are at a railway station in order to prevent the nose from escaping; an inspector rallies them. The nose runs in and tries to stop the train, and a general pursuit ensues, resulting in its capture. The nose is then beaten into its normal size, wrapped and returned to Kovalyov by the inspector, but Kovalyov is unable to reattach it. Nor can a doctor. He then suspects that he has been placed under a spell by a woman called Madame Podtochina, because he would not marry her daughter. He writes to ask her to undo the spell, but she misinterprets the letter as a proposal to her daughter. She convinces him that she is innocent. In the city, crowds fuelled by rumours gather in search of the nose till the police restore order.

==== Epilogue ====
Kovalyov wakes up with his nose reattached, and dances a polka in joy. Yakovlevich has been released from prison and arrives to shave him. Afterwards Kovalyov wanders along Nevsky Prospekt greeting acquaintances, while people discuss the story.

== Recordings ==
- 1964 Bruno Bartoletti, Fonit Cetra – live in Florence, in Italian, with Formichini, Capecchi, and Tajo (as Ivan the servant, tenor; Kovalyov, baritone; and Yakovlevich, bass)
- 1975 Gennady Rozhdestvensky, Melodiya – studio recording made in Moscow and overseen by the composer, with Druzhinin, Akimov, and Belykh in the main roles
- 2001 Armin Jordan, Cascavelle – live in Lausanne, in French, with Matiakh, Schroeder, and Matorin
- 2008 Valery Gergiev, Mariinsky label – studio recording made in St Petersburg with Skorokhodov, Sulimsky. and Tanovitski in the main roles and full Russian and English librettos
- 2010 Gergiev, Sirius radio stream – live in New York on 5 March, with Skorokhodov, Szot, and Ognovenko

=== On video ===
- 1979, movie directed by Bogatirenko; Boris Druzhinin, tenor (Ivan, Kovalyov’s servant), Eduard Akimov (baritone, Kovalyov), Valery Belykh (bass, Yakovlevich); supporting roles: Nina Sasulova (soprano, Praskovya), Boris Tarkhov (high tenor, Policeman), Ashot Sarkisov (bass, Doctor); Chorus and Orchestra of the Moscow Chamber Opera Theatre, Gennady Rozhdestvensky
- 1991, laser disc video (Toshiba EMI TOWL 3747-8) of a performance at the Moscow Chamber Opera Theatre, released four years later (in 1995) but never on DVD; Boris Druzhinin, Eduard Akimov, and Alexei Mochalov in the main roles; Chorus and Orchestra of the Moscow Chamber Opera Theatre, Vladimir Agronsky
- 2013, video-stream of Metropolitan Opera production by William Kentridge; Paulo Szot (baritone, Kovalyov); supporting roles: Andrey Popov (Police Chief), Alexander Lewis (Nose), Pavel Smelkov conducting.
- 2016, video-stream of Royal Opera House production by Barrie Kosky; Wolfgang Ablinger-Sperrhacke (tenor, Ivan, Kovalyov's servant); Martin Winkler (baritone, Kovalyov), John Tomlinson (bass, Yakovlevich); supporting roles: Rosie Aldridge (Praskovya), Alexander Kravets (Policeman), Alexander Lewis (Angry Man in the Cathedral); (Note: Singing the lines assigned in the libretto to the Nose; the Nose itself was a silent role danced by Ilan Galkoff.) Chorus and Orchestra of the Royal Opera House, Ingo Metzmacher conducting

== Notes and references ==
Notes

Sources

- Hulme, Derek C., Dimitri Shostakovich, Scarecrow Press 2002
- Wilson, Elizabeth, Shostakovich: A Life Remembered. London: Faber, 2006
