= Rodeo clown (disambiguation) =

Rodeo clown generally refers to a rodeo performer who protects competitors in bull riding from being injured by the bulls.

The term may also refer to:

- "Rodeo Clown", a song by John Mellencamp from Freedom's Road
- "Rodeo Clowns", a song by Jack Johnson, available on the album On and On or as an earlier collaboration with G. Love and Special Sauce on Philadelphonic

== See also ==
- Clown (disambiguation)
- Rodeo (disambiguation)
