= Gino Sinimberghi =

Italian opera singer

Gino Sinimberghi (photo with 1956 dedication)

Gino Sinimberghi (26 August 1913 – 29 December 1996) was a tenor opera singer from Rome, Italy.

Gino studied voice techniques at the Accademia Nazionale di Santa Cecilia. At the age of 23, he won the Vienna International Vocal Competition of 1935. For the next six years, Gino became a member of the Berlin State Opera and signed a four-year contract with Deutsche Grammophon singing in Leipzig, Danzig, Hamburg, Vienna and Paris. At age 27, he was called to Rome by the conductor Tullio Serafin, who had accompanied his debut at the Opera House in The Barber of Seville by Gioachino Rossini.

During his long career, Gino has interpreted various works into Italian and German languages singing along Beniamino Gigli, Tito Gobbi, Italo Tajo, Jon Vickers, Maria Callas, Erna Berger, Rosanna Carteri, under great conductors such as Paul Hindemith, Herbert von Karajan and the already mentioned Tullio Serafin.

As a light lyric tenor, Gino recorded arias and duets from Don Pasquale, L'elisir d'amore, and La bohème over a period of 45 years. Gino also appeared in several Italian films depicting an opera singer, chosen also for his photogenic qualities (see IMDB filmography in external links).

== Selected filmography ==
- Before Him All Rome Trembled (1946)
- Il Trovatore (1949)
- The Force of Destiny (1950)
- La Favorita (1952)
- For You I Have Sinned (1953)
- The Angel of the Alps (1957)
