= Clown (disambiguation) =

A clown is a performer who often reflects the humour and/or frailty of the human condition.

Clown or clowns may also refer to:

== People ==
- Shawn Crahan (born 1969), American musician who performs under the name "Clown"

== Arts, entertainment, and media ==
=== Fictional characters ===
- Clown (Harlequinade), the name of a stock character in the "Harlequinade" entertainment, developed in England between the 17th and mid-19th centuries
- Evil clown, dating back to 19th century works, a trope horror or dark humor character
- Clown (Marvel Comics), the name of two Marvel Comics characters, appearing first in 1962
- Clown (DC Comics), a 1979 DC Comics supervillain
- Clown (Image Comics), an Image Comics 1992 supervillain, originally known as Violator

=== Films ===
- I Clowns (film) (also known as The Clowns), a 1970 television film by Federico Fellini
- Clown (film), a 2014 horror film
- Paljas, a 1997 South African film, titled (The) Clown in English

=== Music ===
- "Clown" (Mariah Carey song)
- "Clown" (Korn song)
- "Clown" (Emeli Sandé song), a 2012 single by Emeli Sandé
- "Clowns" (song), by Goldfrapp
- "Clown" a song by Clown Core
- Clowns (band), an Australian hardcore punk band
- "Clowns", a song by Blackbear from Everything Means Nothing
- "Clowns (Can You See Me Now?)", a song by t.A.T.u. from 200 km/h in the Wrong Lane

=== Other uses in arts, entertainment, and media ===
- Clowns (video game), 1978
- Der Clown, a 1998 German television series

== Biology ==
- Clownfish, a fish from the subfamily Amphiprioninae
- Clown loach, a tropical freshwater fish

== Other uses ==
- HMS Clown, the name ship of the 1856 Clown-class gunboats of the Royal Navy
- Indianapolis Clowns, (c. 1930s), a professional baseball team

== See also ==
- Clowne, Derbyshire, England
- Klovn, a Danish television sitcom
- Klovn The Movie, a 2010 Danish comedy film, a spinoff of the sitcom
- Pagliacci, an Italian opera
- Rodeo clown, a rodeo performer who works in bull riding competitions
- Tears of a Clown (disambiguation)
- The Clown (disambiguation)
