= The Legend of Faust =

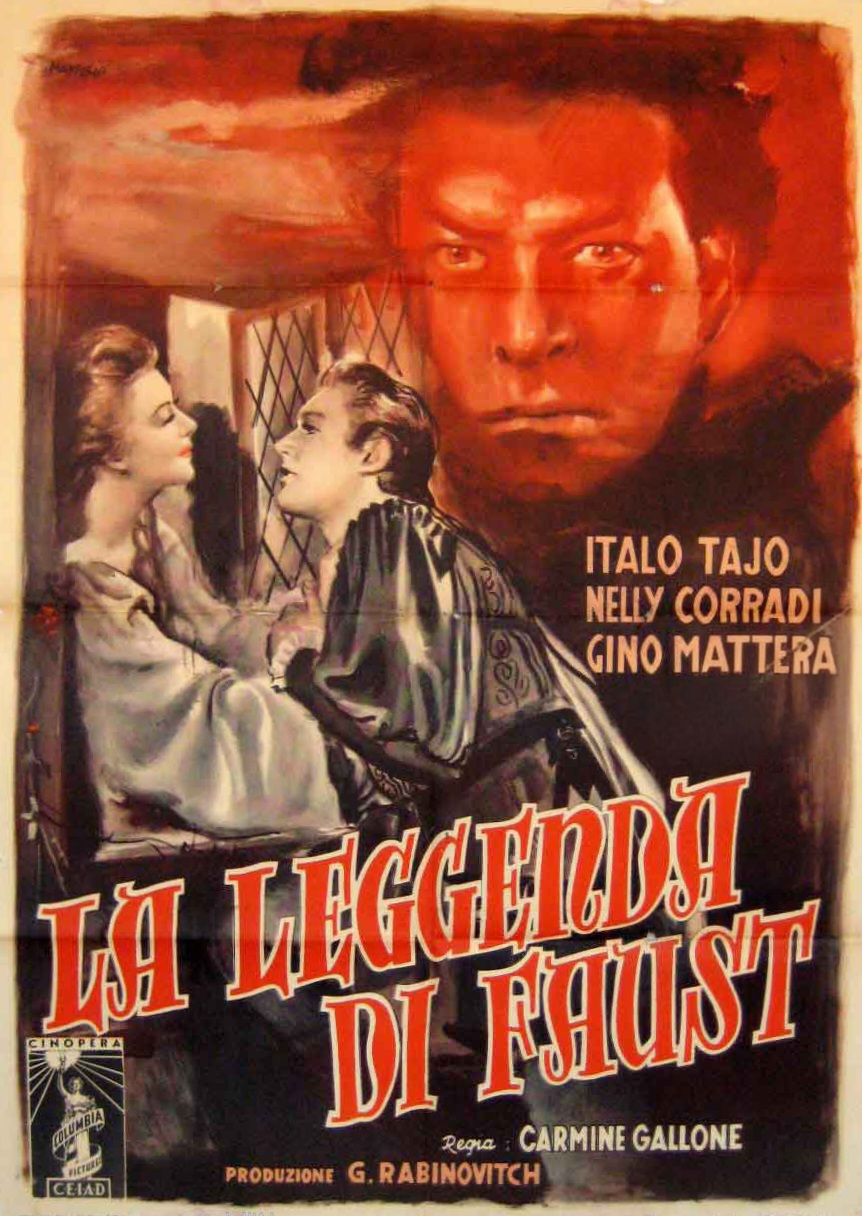
- Directed by: Carmine Gallone
- Written by: Léopold Marchand; Johann Wolfgang von Goethe (play); Arrigo Boito (opera)
- Produced by: Gregor Rabinovitch
- Starring: Italo Tajo; Nelly Corradi; Gino Mattera
- Cinematography: Arturo Gallea; Václav Vích
- Edited by: Niccolò Lazzari; Fernando Tropea
- Production company: Cineopera
- Release date: 1949
- Running time: 86 minutes
- Country: Italy
- Language: Italian

The Legend of Faust (Italian: La leggenda di Faust) is a 1949 Italian drama film directed by Carmine Gallone and starring Italo Tajo, Nelly Corradi and Gino Mattera.

== Cast ==
- Italo Tajo as Mephistofele
- Nelly Corradi as Margherita
- Gino Mattera as Faust
- Onelia Fineschi as Marguerite (singing voice)
- Livia Venturini
- Cesare Barbetti as Siebel
- Gilles Quéant as Valentino
- Thérèse Dorny as Marta
- Guido Leoncini
- Gualtiero Tumiati
- Claudio Ermelli

== Bibliography ==
- Goble, Alan. The Complete Index to Literary Sources in Film. Walter de Gruyter, 1999.
