= Dmitry Bertman =

Russian theatre and opera director

- Дмитрий Бертман
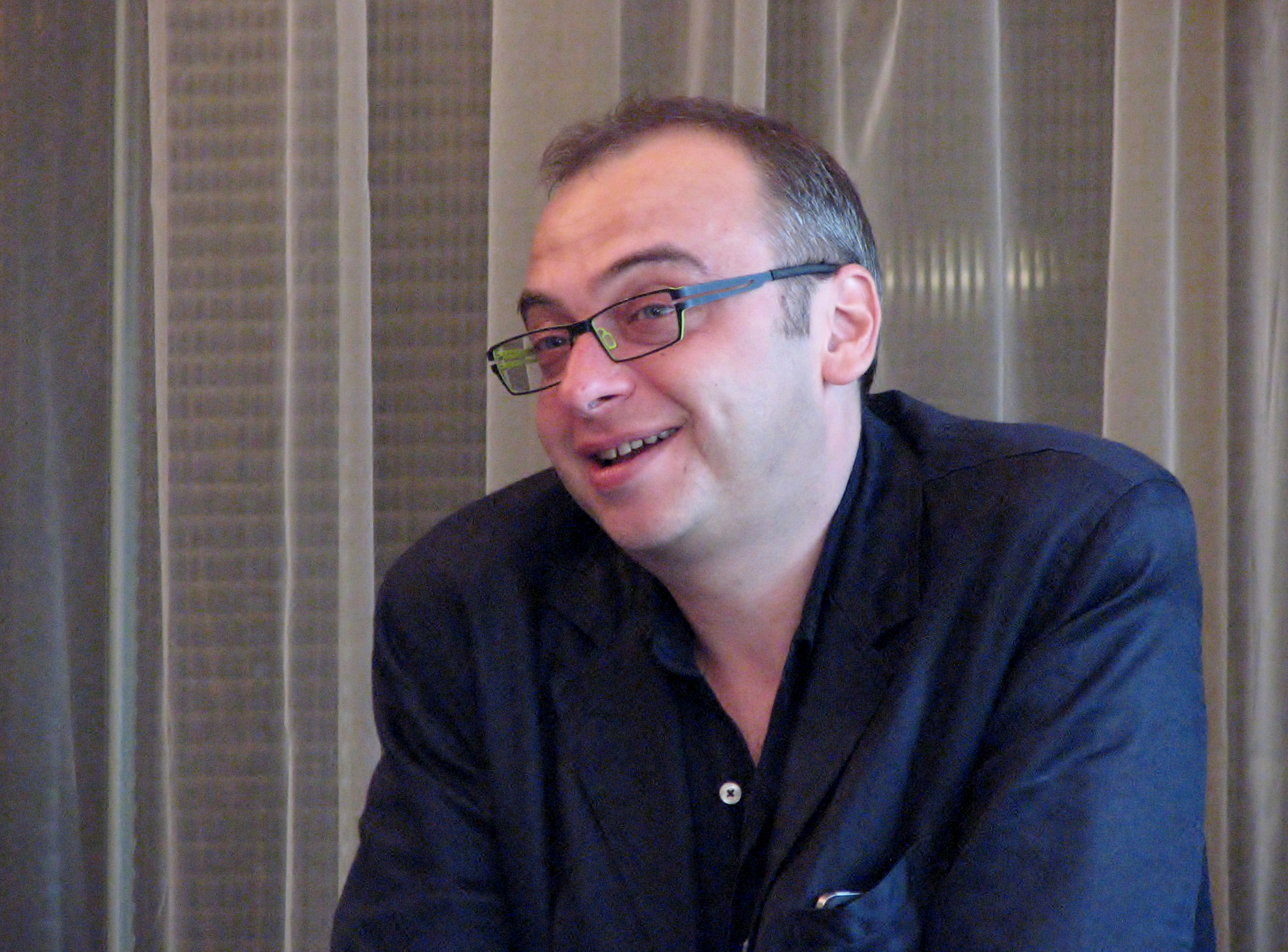
- Dmitry Bertman (2012)
- Born: Dmitry Alexandrovitch Bertman; 31 October 1967 (age 58); Moscow, Russian SFSR, Soviet Union
- Education: Russian Academy of Theatre Arts
- Occupations: theatre director; opera director; teacher
- Years active: 1988–present

Dmitry Alexandrovitch Bertman (Russian: Дмитрий Александрович Бертман; born 31 October 1967) is a Russian theatre and opera director and the founder and artistic director of Helikon Opera in Moscow.

== Early years ==
Bertman was born in Moscow, the son of Alexander Bertman and Ludmila Zhumaeva. He graduated from Russian Academy of Theatre Arts where he studied under Georgy Ansimov. Back in his student years he staged a number of opera, musical and dramatic performances at first in his Studio Theater together with Jacob Rosenberg and later in professional theaters in Moscow, Tver, Odessa and Syktyvkar. In 1990 Bertman founded Helikon Opera and remains its artistic director.

== Career ==
In 1990 Dmitry Bertman established Helikon Opera theatre in Moscow. The theatre was included to the state theatres in 1993 and became one of the biggest opera houses in Russia.

Helikon Opera offers a wide repertoire, including operas of the 18th–20th centuries, both rare and the most popular ones, as well as operettas and musicals. The theatre actively tours Russia and abroad.

Since 1994 Dmitry Bertman has held master-classes at the Bern Opera Studio, teaching the approaches to acting and performance of Konstantin Stanislavski, Michael Chekhov and Feodor Chaliapin. Several times he has been a jury member of Belveder Vocal Contest, Ottavio Ziino Opera Competition in Roma, New York International Opera Auditions and other competitions. He teaches at both the Moscow State Conservatory and the Russian Academy of Theatre Arts where he has been artistic director of the academy's musical theatre workshop from 1996 and Head of the Music Theatre Department from 2003. Since 1994, Berman has also been a lecturer at the Berne Opera studio in Switzerland.

== Awards ==
Between 1997 and 2000 Dmitry Bertman received the Golden Mask Award (Best Stage Director) for his productions of Carmen, The Tsar's Bride and Lady Macbeth of the Mtsensk District.
