= Dimmed Lights =

- Directed by: Adelqui Migliar
- Written by: Michele Galdieri; Giacomo Gentilomo
- Starring: Fosco Giachetti; Nelly Corradi; Laura Nucci
- Cinematography: Ubaldo Arata; Carlo Montuori
- Edited by: Giacomo Gentilomo; Adelqui Migliar
- Music by: Daniele Amfitheatrof
- Production company: Roma Internazionale Film
- Release date: 1934
- Running time: 74 minutes
- Country: Italy
- Language: Italian

Dimmed Lights (Italian: Luci sommerse) is a 1934 Italian drama film directed by Adelqui Migliar and starring Fosco Giachetti, Nelly Corradi and Laura Nucci. The film was released in the United States in 1936, and is sometimes dated by that year.

The film's sets were designed by the art director Guido Fiorini.

== Cast ==
- Fosco Giachetti as Lord Spider
- Nelly Corradi as Adriana d'Aurigny
- Laura Nucci as The vamp
- Augusto Marcacci
- Yvonne Sandner
- Carlo Reiter
- Raimondo Van Riel
- Amina Pirani Maggi
- Danilo Calamai
- Arturo Cellini
- Carlo Chertier
- Tonio Masini
- Arturo Vitaletti

== Bibliography ==
- Plazaola, Luis Trelles. South American Cinema. La Editorial, UPR, 1989.
