= Oliviero De Fabritiis =

Italian conductor and composer

Oliviero De Fabritiis (photo with 1950 dedication)

Oliviero De Fabritiis (13 June 1902 – 12 August 1982) was an Italian conductor and composer.

Oliviero De Fabritiis was born in Rome, where he studied with Refice and Setaccialo. He made his debut at the Teatro Nazionale in Rome in 1920, and later moved to the Teatro Adriano. He was artistic secretary at the Teatro dell'Opera di Roma from 1932 until 1943. He inaugurated the summer performances at the Baths of Caracalla in 1937, with Lucia di Lammermoor. He conducted widely in Italy, notably in Verona from 1948 until 1980. He conducted many operas with Beniamino Gigli, with whom he also made famous recordings; Andrea Chénier, Tosca, Madama Butterfly. In 1951, De Fabritiis conducted a series of performances in Mexico City with Maria Callas. In 1956, he conducted the television production of Madama Butterfly, which launched Anna Moffo's career. That same year he conducted the soundtrack of a filmed Tosca with Maria Caniglia (voicing the on-screen Franca Duval), and Franco Corelli. He also conducted Leontyne Price in her first operatic album for RCA (a 1960 collection of Verdi and Puccini arias, known as "The Blue Album"), and Luciano Pavarotti, Mirella Freni and Montserrat Caballé in recordings of Mefistofele.

He appeared widely in Europe, America and Japan, mostly conducting the standard Italian opera repertory. He was admired for his Italianate warmth of expression, and for his skills at balancing consideration for voices and instrumental details. He was also the composer of a number of vocal works.

He died in Rome in 1982, aged 80.

== Sources ==
- Grove Music Online, Piero Rattalino, July 2008.
