= Lady Macbeth of Mtsensk (opera) =

1934 opera by Dmitri Shostakovich

- Opera by Dmitri Shostakovich
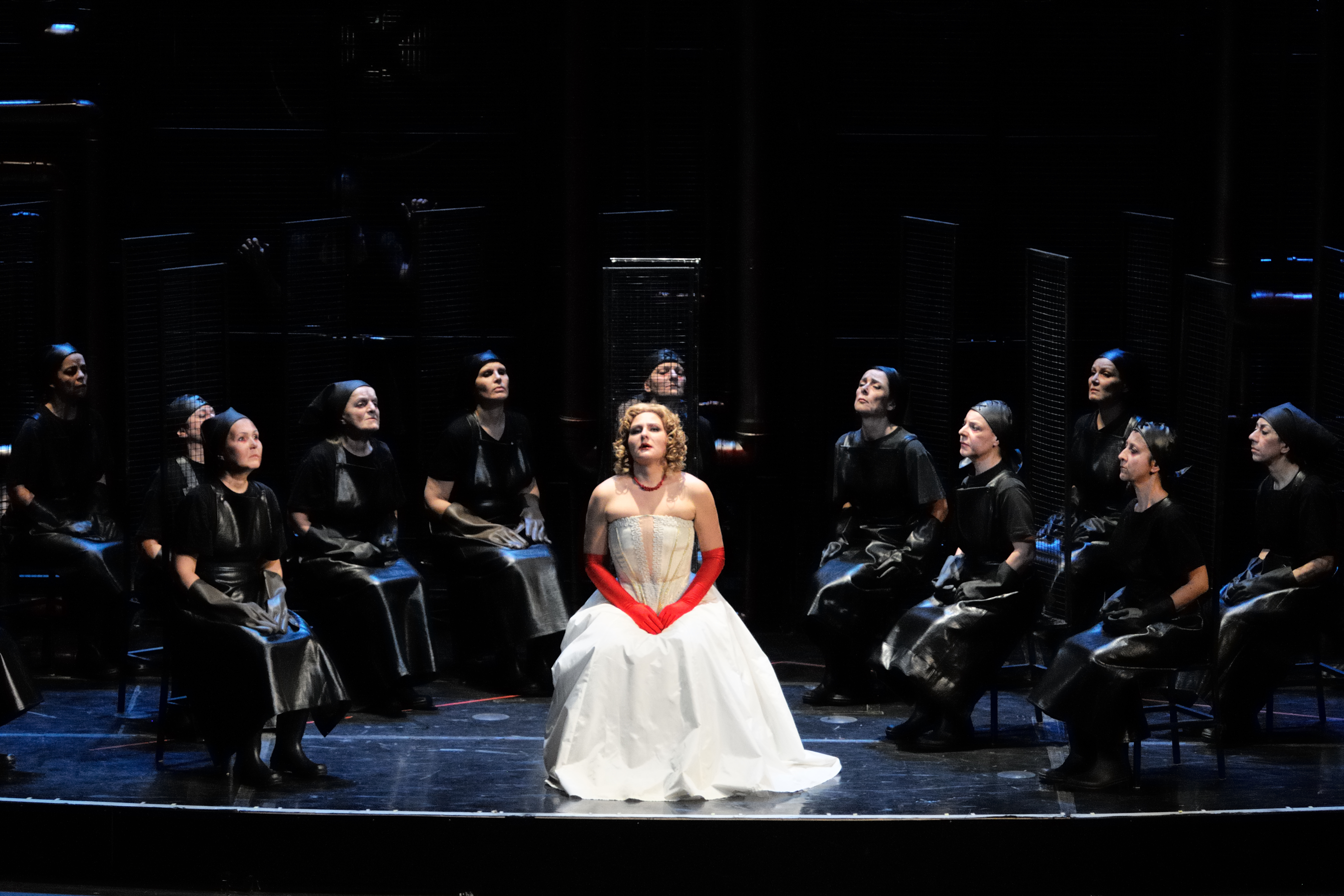
- Production of the Helikon Opera Moscow at the Teatro Comunale di Bologna in December 2014, with Svetlana Sozdateleva in the title role, staged by Dmitry Bertman
- Native title: Russian: Леди Макбет Мценского уезда, romanized: Ledi Makbet Mtsenskogo uyezda
- Librettist: Alexander Preis; Dmitri Shostakovich
- Language: Russian
- Based on: Lady Macbeth of the Mtsensk District by Nikolai Leskov
- Premiere: 22 January 1934; Leningrad Maly Operny Theatre

Lady Macbeth of Mtsensk, Op. 29 (Russian: Леди Макбет Мценского уезда, romanized: Ledi Makbet Mtsenskogo uyezda, lit. 'Lady Macbeth of the Mtsensk District'), is an opera in four acts and nine scenes by Dmitri Shostakovich. The libretto, jointly written by Alexander Preis and the composer, is based on the novella Lady Macbeth of the Mtsensk District by Nikolai Leskov.

Dedicated by Shostakovich to his first wife, the physicist Nina Varzar, the opera was first performed on 22 January 1934 at the Leningrad Maly Operny Theatre, and received its Moscow premiere two days later. It combines elements of expressionism and verismo, telling the story of Katerina Izmailova, a lonely woman in 19th-century Russia who falls in love with one of her husband's workers and becomes involved in a sequence of murders.

== Performance history ==
The opera was initially successful in both Leningrad and Moscow, and was also performed outside the Soviet Union during the 1930s. According to Tim Ashley in The Guardian, it had received nearly 200 performances in the Soviet Union and had also been heard in Copenhagen, Prague, New York and London before its official condemnation.

Despite this early success, Lady Macbeth became the vehicle for a major public denunciation of Shostakovich's music in 1936. On 28 January 1936, shortly after Joseph Stalin attended a Moscow performance, the Soviet newspaper Pravda published the unsigned article "Muddle Instead of Music", attacking the opera's musical language and stage content. Recent scholarship has identified the journalist David Zaslavsky as the likely author of the article. Performances declined after the denunciation, and the work disappeared from Soviet stages for decades.

In 1962 Shostakovich revised the opera under the title Katerina Izmailova (Russian: Катерина Измайлова), assigning it Op. 114. The revision altered parts of the score and libretto, including changes to act 1, scene 3 and the replacement of two orchestral interludes. Katerina Izmailova was first performed on 26 December 1962 at the Stanislavski and Nemirovich-Danchenko Musical Theatre in Moscow. After Shostakovich's death, the original 1934 version gradually returned to the international repertoire, and the uncensored version was again staged in Russia in 2000 by Helikon Opera in a production directed by Dmitry Bertman.

== Selected 21st-century productions ==
Since 2000, the opera has continued to be staged by major opera houses and festivals. Selected productions include:

Year	Opera house / city	Stage director	Conductor
2000	Teatro Real, Madrid	Sergio Renán	Mstislav Rostropovich
2000	Helikon Opera, Moscow	Dmitry Bertman	Vladimir Ponkin
2000	Metropolitan Opera, New York	Graham Vick	Valery Gergiev
2001	National Theatre, Prague	David Radok	František Preisler
2001	Grand Théâtre de Genève, Geneva	Nicolas Brieger	Armin Jordan
2002	Gran Teatre del Liceu, Barcelona	Stein Winge	Alexander Anissimov
2003	San Francisco Opera, San Francisco	Johannes Schaaf	Donald Runnicles
2003	Mariinsky Theatre, Saint Petersburg	Irina Molostova	Valery Gergiev
2004	Royal Opera House, London	Richard Jones	Antonio Pappano
2004	Komische Oper Berlin, Berlin	Hans Neuenfels	Vassily Sinaisky
2006	Dutch National Opera / Holland Festival, Amsterdam	Martin Kušej	Mariss Jansons
2006	Israeli Opera, Tel Aviv	Dmitri Bertman	Vladimir Ponkin
2008	Maggio Musicale Fiorentino, Florence	Lev Dodin	James Conlon
2009	Vienna State Opera, Vienna	Matthias Hartmann	Kirill Petrenko
2009	Opéra Bastille, Paris Opera, Paris	Martin Kušej	Hartmut Haenchen
2011	Teatr Wielki im. Stanisława Moniuszki, Poznań	Marcelo Lombardero	Gabriel Chmura
2015	Ruse State Opera / Sofia	Vera Nemirova	Nayden Todorov
2016	Bavarian State Opera, Munich	Harry Kupfer	Kirill Petrenko
2025	La Scala, Milan	Vasily Barkhatov	Riccardo Chailly

== Roles ==
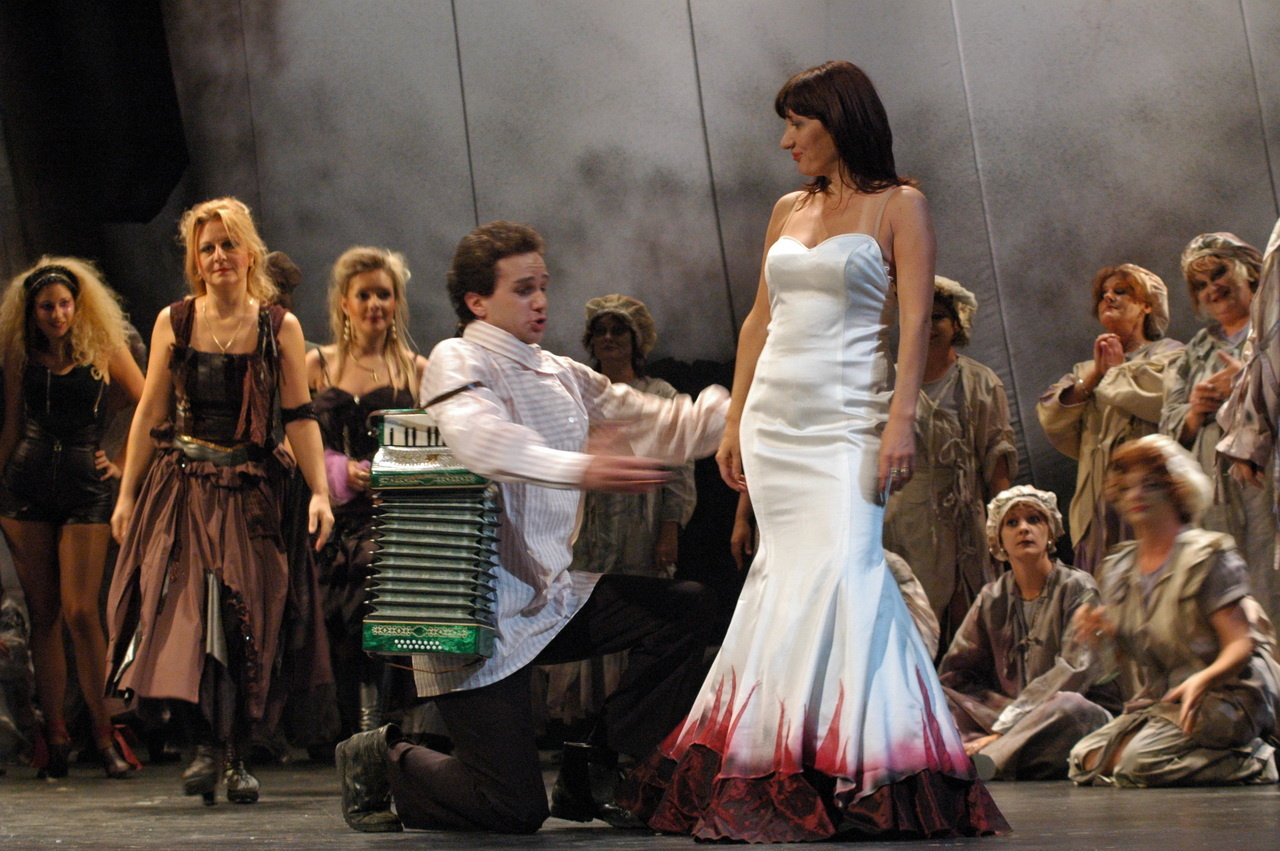
2006 performance, Serbian National Theatre

Roles, voice types, premiere cast
Role	Voice type	Premiere cast, 22 January 1934 Conductor: Samuil Samosud
Boris Timofeyevich Izmailov, a merchant	high bass	
Zinoviy Borisovich Izmailov, his son	tenor	
Katerina Lvovna Izmailova, wife of Zinoviy Borisovich	soprano	Agrippina Ivanovna Sokolova
Sergei, a workman employed at the Izmailovs	tenor	
Aksinya, a workwoman employed at the Izmailovs	soprano	
Tattered peasant / Village drunk	tenor	
Workman, employed at the Izmailovs	baritone	
Steward, a workman employed at the Izmailovs	bass	
Porter, a workman employed at the Izmailovs	bass	
First workman, employed at the Izmailovs	tenor	
Second workman, employed at the Izmailovs	tenor	
Priest	bass	Pavel Yuravlenko
Police inspector	bass	Aleksei Petrovich Ivanov
Local nihilist	tenor	
Policeman	bass	
Old convict	bass	
Sonyetka, a convict	contralto	
Female convict	soprano	
Sergeant	bass	
Sentry	bass	
Ghost of Boris Timofeyevich	bass	Georgiy Nikolaievich Orlov
Chorus: SATB, divided parts – Workmen and women employed at the Izmailovs; policemen; wedding guests; male and female convicts

== Synopsis ==
Although the opera shares the basic characters and outline of Leskov's novella, it differs from the original story in plot detail and emphasis. One example occurs in the convict convoy scene after Katerina gives Sergei her stockings: in the opera, all the women mock Katerina, whereas in the novella Sergei and Sonyetka mock her while Fiona and Gordyushka shame them in response to their cruelty.

=== Act 1 ===
Scene 1: Katerina's room

Katerina is unhappily married to Zinovy, a provincial flour merchant. She complains to herself of her loneliness. Her father-in-law, Boris, angered at her response to his saying that mushrooms are his favourite dish, says that her loneliness is her fault because she has not produced an heir. She replies that Zinovy cannot give her a child, which Boris disdains. He then threatens her if she decides to accept a youthful lover. Zinovy is called away on business, and Boris, against his son's inclinations, makes Katerina swear before an icon to be faithful. A servant, Aksinya, tells Katerina about the womanising new clerk, Sergei.

Scene 2: The Izmailovs' yard

Sergei and his comrades are sexually harassing Aksinya. Katerina intervenes. She berates him for his machismo and asserts that women are as brave and capable as men. Sergei is willing to prove her wrong, and they wrestle; she is thrown down and Sergei falls on top of her. Boris appears. Katerina says that she tripped and Sergei fell while trying to help her. The other peasants back her up. Boris is suspicious and roars at the peasants, telling them to get back to work, before ordering Katerina to fry some mushrooms for him and threatening to tell Zinovy about her behaviour.

Scene 3: Katerina's room

Katerina prepares to go to bed. Sergei knocks on her door with the excuse that he wants to borrow a book because he cannot sleep, but Katerina has none; she cannot read. As she is about to close the door, he attempts to seduce her by recalling their wrestling match earlier that day. He enters the room and forces himself on her. Afterwards, she tells him to leave, but he refuses and she agrees to begin an affair with him. Boris knocks on the door and confirms that Katerina is in bed, then locks her in. Sergei is trapped in the room, and the two have sex again.

=== Act 2 ===
Scene 4: The yard

One night a week later, Boris, unable to sleep because of unease about thieves, is walking in the courtyard in the pre-dawn darkness. Remembering his own days as a young rake and knowing Zinovy's low libido, he considers seducing Katerina himself in order to fulfil his son's marital duties. He spots Sergei climbing out of Katerina's window. He catches him and publicly whips him as a burglar, then has him locked up. Katerina witnesses this but cannot stop it because she remains locked in her room. When she eventually climbs down the drainpipe, the other servants restrain her on Boris's order. Exhausted after beating Sergei, Boris demands a meal, saying that he will whip Sergei again the next day, and sends a servant to recall Zinovy, telling him to say that there is trouble at home. Katerina adds rat poison to mushrooms and gives them to Boris. As he dies, calling for a priest, she retrieves the keys to free Sergei. The priest, called by the arriving morning shift of workers who find Boris in agony, arrives; Boris vainly tries to say that he was poisoned and falls back dead, pointing at Katerina. Katerina, weeping crocodile tears, convinces the priest that Boris accidentally ate poisonous mushrooms, and he says a prayer over Boris's body.

Scene 5: Katerina's room

Katerina and Sergei are together. Sergei says that their affair will have to end because Zinovy is about to return, and that he wishes he and Katerina could marry. Katerina assures him that they will marry but refuses to tell him how she will arrange it. Sergei falls asleep; Katerina is tormented by Boris's ghost and cannot sleep. Later she hears Zinovy returning. He has been called back by one of the servants with news of his father's death. Although Sergei hides, Zinovy sees his trousers and belt and guesses the truth. As he and Katerina quarrel, he whips her with the belt. Hearing Katerina's cries, Sergei emerges and confronts Zinovy, who then tries to escape and call the servants. Katerina stops him: she and Sergei strangle him, and Sergei finishes him off with a blow to the head from a heavy candlestick. The lovers hide the corpse in the wine cellar.

=== Act 3 ===
Scene 6: Near the cellar

Following Zinovy's disappearance, he is presumed dead. Katerina and Sergei prepare to get married, but she is tormented by the knowledge that Zinovy's corpse is hidden in the wine cellar. Sergei reassures her, and they leave for the wedding ceremony. A drunken peasant breaks into the cellar, finds Zinovy's body and goes to fetch the police.

Scene 7: The police station

The police complain about not being invited to the wedding and vainly try to distract themselves by tormenting a socialist schoolteacher for his alleged atheism, when the peasant arrives and gives them the opportunity for revenge.

Scene 8: The Izmailov garden

Everyone is drunk at the wedding. Katerina sees that the cellar door is open, but the police arrive as she and Sergei try to escape.

=== Act 4 ===
Scene 9: A temporary convict camp near a bridge

On the way to katorga in Siberia, Katerina bribes a guard to allow her to meet Sergei. He blames her for everything. After she leaves, Sergei tries to seduce another convict, Sonyetka, who demands a pair of stockings as her price. Sergei tricks Katerina into giving him hers, and then gives them to Sonyetka. Sonyetka and the other convicts taunt Katerina, who pushes Sonyetka into an icy river and falls in herself. They are swept away, and the convict train moves on.

== Critical reception ==
The opera's reception has often centred on its mixture of satire, violence, sexuality and sympathy for Katerina. Early Western responses sometimes focused on the explicitness of the musical and dramatic language; a 1935 review in the New York Sun used the term "pornophony" for the music accompanying the sexual encounter between Katerina and Sergei. Igor Stravinsky was also critical of the work, describing it as "lamentably provincial".

The most consequential criticism came from the Soviet press. The 1936 Pravda article "Muddle Instead of Music" condemned the opera as coarse, confused and alien to Soviet taste; the article became a turning point in Shostakovich's career and in Soviet musical politics. Later commentators have debated the extent to which the opera should be understood primarily through the lens of Stalinist censorship. Richard Taruskin argued that the work's violence and social satire should be considered in the political context of the early Soviet period, while other writers have stressed Katerina's dramatic centrality and the opera's musical originality.

== Adaptations ==
- 1966 Katerina Izmailova – the opera was adapted into a film directed by Mikhail Shapiro, starring Galina Vishnevskaya as Katerina, produced by Lenfilm and filmed in the Sovscope 70mm process.
- 1992 Lady Macbeth von Mzensk – a film by Czech director Petr Weigl, starring Markéta Hrubešová as Katerina. The film used the 1979 Mstislav Rostropovich recording, with Galina Vishnevskaya dubbing Hrubešová as Katerina.

== Recordings ==
Important recordings include the 1979 EMI studio recording conducted by Mstislav Rostropovich, with Galina Vishnevskaya as Katerina and Nicolai Gedda as Sergei, and the 1993 Deutsche Grammophon recording conducted by Myung-whun Chung with the Orchestre de l'Opéra Bastille and Maria Ewing in the title role.
