= The Clown =

The Clown or The Clowns may refer to:

== Books ==
- The Clown (novel), a 1963 novel by Heinrich Böll
- The Clown (short story), by Thomas Mann
- The Clown (2000 AD), a series from the comic 2000 AD

== Film and TV ==
- The Clown (1916 film), a 1916 silent film directed by William C. deMille and starring Victor Moore
- The Clown (1931 film). a 1931 short animated film
- The Clown (1953 film), starring Red Skelton
- The Clown (1976 film), a 1976 West German film directed by Vojtěch Jasný
- The Clown (2011 film), a 2011 Brazilian film
- The Clowns (film), a 1970 film directed by Federico Fellini
- Der Clown, a German television series
- Paljas, a 1997 South African film, titled (The) Clown in English

== Music ==
- The Clown (album), a 1957 album by Charles Mingus
- "The Clown", 1969 song by Status Quo from Spare Parts
- "The Clown", 1977 song by BZN
- "The Clown" (Conway Twitty song), 1982
- Clowns (band), an Australian punk rock band, formed in 2009

== See also ==
- Clown (disambiguation)
