= Tears of a Clown =

Tears of a Clown may refer to:

- Tears of a Clown (album), an album by Andre Nickatina
- Madonna: Tears of a Clown, two concerts by Madonna
- "Tears of a Clown", a song by Iron Maiden from the 2015 studio album The Book of Souls
- "The Tears of a Clown", a song by Smokey Robinson & the Miracles
- Tears of a Clown: Glenn Beck and the Tea Bagging of America (2010), a political commentary book by Washington Post columnist Dana Milbank

== See also ==
- Pagliacci (disambiguation)
