= The Wildcat (1936 film) =

- Directed by: Rosario Pi
- Written by: Manuel Penella (libretto); Rosario Pi
- Starring: Pablo Hertogs; María del Pilar Lebrón; Víctor Merás; Mapy Cortés
- Cinematography: Puig Ferran; Isidoro Goldberger
- Music by: Manuel Penella
- Production company: CIFESA
- Release date: 6 March 1936
- Running time: 89 minutes
- Country: Spain
- Language: Spanish

The Wildcat (Spanish: El gato montés) is a 1936 Spanish musical drama directed by Catalan Rosario Pi and starring Pablo Hertogs, María del Pilar Lebrón, Víctor Merás and Mapy Cortés. It is based on the 1916 Spanish popular opera (also known as zarzuela or Spanish operetta) El gato montés by Manuel Penella. El gato montés is the first film in Spanish sound cinema directed by a woman.

== Cast ==
- Pablo Hertogs as Juanillo, El Gato Montés
- María del Pilar Lebrón as Soleá
- Juan Barajas as Pesuño
- Honorio Barreto
- Hermanas Borrull
- Pepita Boti
- Enrique Castellón as Juanillo niño
- Modesto Cid
- Consuelo Companys as Frasquita
- Laura Coronado
- Mapy Cortés as Lolilla
- Emilia Españo as Tiple
- Miguel García
- Eugenia Gracián as Soleá (niña)
- Francisco Hernández as Padre Antón
- Antonio Marcet as Caballista
- Charito Mariscal
- Víctor Merás as Rafael, El Macareno
- Anita Morales
- Fausto Otero
- Enrique Pascual
- César Pombo
- Pedro Ripoll as Niño
- José Rueda as Hormigón
- Ina Tomás
- Joaquín Valle as Caireles

== Bibliography ==
- Bentley, Bernard. A Companion to Spanish Cinema. Boydell & Brewer, 2008.
- Martin-Márquez, Susan. Feminist Discourse and Spanish Cinema: Sight Unseen. Oxford UP, 1999.
