= Nelly Corradi =

Italian opera singer and actress

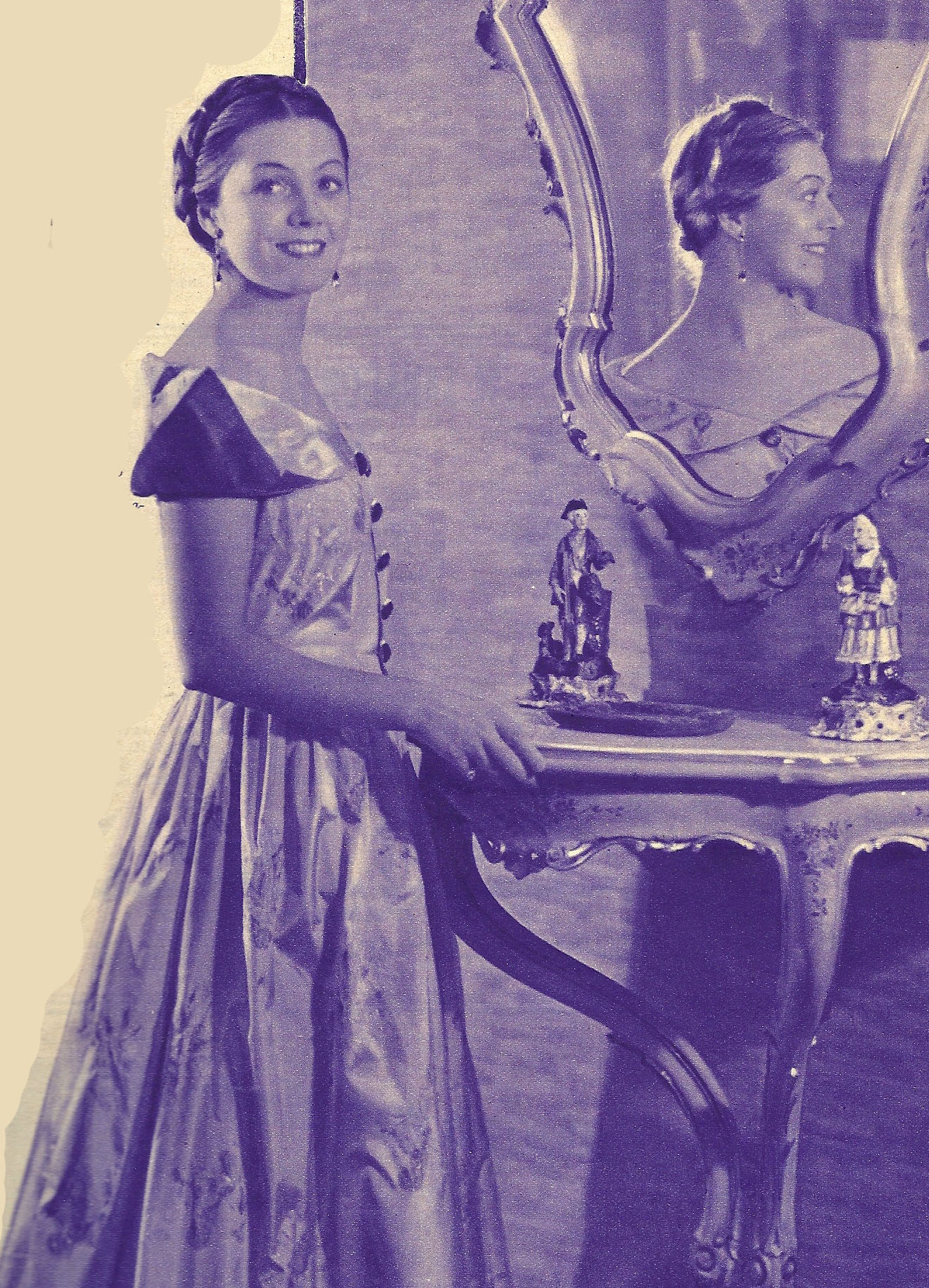
- Born: 16 December 1914; Parma, Kingdom of Italy
- Died: 16 April 1968 (aged 53); Rome, Italy
- Occupations: Actress; singer
- Years active: 1934–1956 (film)

Nelly Corradi (16 December 1914 – 16 April 1968) was an Italian opera singer and actress. She made her screen debut in Max Ophüls' 1934 film Everybody's Woman.

== Selected filmography ==
- Dimmed Lights (1934)
- Everybody's Woman (1934)
- Il Torrente (1937)
- No Man's Land (1939)
- La zia smemorata (1940)
- Headlights in the Fog (1942)
- Measure for Measure (1943)
- The Barber of Seville (1947)
- The Lady of the Camellias (1947)
- The Legend of Faust (1949)
- The Force of Destiny (1950)
- The Count of Saint Elmo (1950)
- Puccini (1953)
- House of Ricordi (1954)

== Bibliography ==
- Bayman, Louis. Directory of World Cinema: Italy. Intellect Books, 2011.
