= Rosario Pi =

Catalan film director

- Born: Rosario Pi Brujas; 1899; Barcelona, Spain
- Died: 1967; Madrid, Spain
- Occupation(s): Film director, screenwriter

Rosario Pi was a Catalan film director, producer, and screenwriter. With the release of her 1936 film El Gato montés (The Wildcat) she became one of Spain's women film pioneers, along with Elena Jordi and Helena Cortesina. She also directed Molinos de viento. Her Star Films Movie Company produced the first talkies in Spain.

== Biography ==
Rosario was born in Barcelona in 1899 into a family that owned a textile factory in Sabadell. She walked with a limp from a young age (likely due to polio, according to historians).

As a young woman, she forged a path for herself as an entrepreneur, starting her own lingerie business in Barcelona. When her business failed in 1929, she moved to Madrid and entered the fledgling film industry, forming a production company called Star Films. Star Films produced the first Spanish talkies. In 1935 she made her debut as director with El Gato Montés (The Wildcat), released in 1936, an adaptation of the Manuel Penella Moreno's operetta of the same name. After she moved back to Barcelona to direct her second feature film Molinos de viento in 1937, during the Spanish Civil War, her career as a filmmaker more or less ended, and she was forced into exile in Italy. Unfortunately, her film Molinos de viento, starring Maria Mercader, is lost. In Rome, she worked as Maria Mercader's agent, who soon became one of Cinecittà film studios stars. Some critics believe that Pi Brujas continued working in the film industry in Rome, and was the uncredited director of the film Forza bruta (1940). For Magí Crusells and Jordi Sebastian, back in Madrid, she run a restaurant and worked as a journalist under the pseudonym of Rizpay. For Martin-Márquez she instead got a job at the Casa Mabel, a fashion designer that produced costumes for the film industry and made Ana Mariscal's dresses. Ironically, Mariscal was the actress who, just a few years later, would take Rosario Pi's place as the sole woman filmmaker in Spain.

== Selected filmography ==
=== As producer ===
- ¡Yo quiero que me lleven a Hollywood! (medium length film, directed by Edgard Neville, 1932).
- El hombre que se reía del amor (feature film, directed by Benito Perojo, 1932)
- Odio (feature film, directed by Richard Harlan, 1933)
- Doce hombres y una mujer (feature film, directed by Fernando Delgado, 1934)

=== As director ===
- El Gato montés (The Wildcat) (1936)
- Molinos de viento (The Windmills) (1937) - lost
- Forza bruta (Brute Force) (1940) - uncredited

=== As screenwriter ===
- Doce hombres y una mujer (feature film, directed by Fernando Delgado, 1934)
