= The Barber of Seville (1947 film) =

- Argentine poster for the film
- Directed by: Mario Costa
- Written by: Pierre Beaumarchais (play); Cesare Sterbini; Deems Taylor
- Produced by: Mario Trombetti; Ugo Trombetti
- Starring: Ferruccio Tagliavini; Tito Gobbi; Nelly Corradi; Vito De Taranto
- Cinematography: Massimo Terzano
- Edited by: Renzo Lucidi
- Music by: Gioachino Rossini (opera); Giuseppe Morelli
- Production company: Tespi Film
- Distributed by: Ates Film
- Release date: 5 May 1947
- Running time: 90 minutes
- Country: Italy
- Language: Italian

The Barber of Seville (Italian: Il barbiere di Siviglia) is a 1947 Italian opera film directed by Mario Costa and starring Ferruccio Tagliavini, Tito Gobbi and Nelly Corradi. It is an adaptation of Gioachino Rossini's 1816 opera The Barber of Seville.

== Cast ==
- Ferruccio Tagliavini as Count Almaviva
- Tito Gobbi as Figaro
- Nelly Corradi as Rosina
- Vito De Taranto as Don Bartolo
- Italo Tajo as Don Basilio
- Natalia Nicolini as Berta
- Nino Mazziotti as Fiorello

== See also ==
- The Barber of Seville, 1775 play

== Bibliography ==
- Brunetta, Gian Piero. The History of Italian Cinema: A Guide to Italian Film from Its Origins to the Twenty-first Century. Princeton University Press, 2009.
