= Alexander Preys =

Soviet writer of plays and libretti (1905–1942)

Alexander Germanovich Preys (Russian: Алекса́ндр Ге́рманович Прейс; 1905–1942) was a Soviet writer of numerous plays and libretti, including those for Shostakovich's operas The Nose and Lady Macbeth of the Mtsensk District.
