= Yuri Alexandrov (director) =

Russian opera director

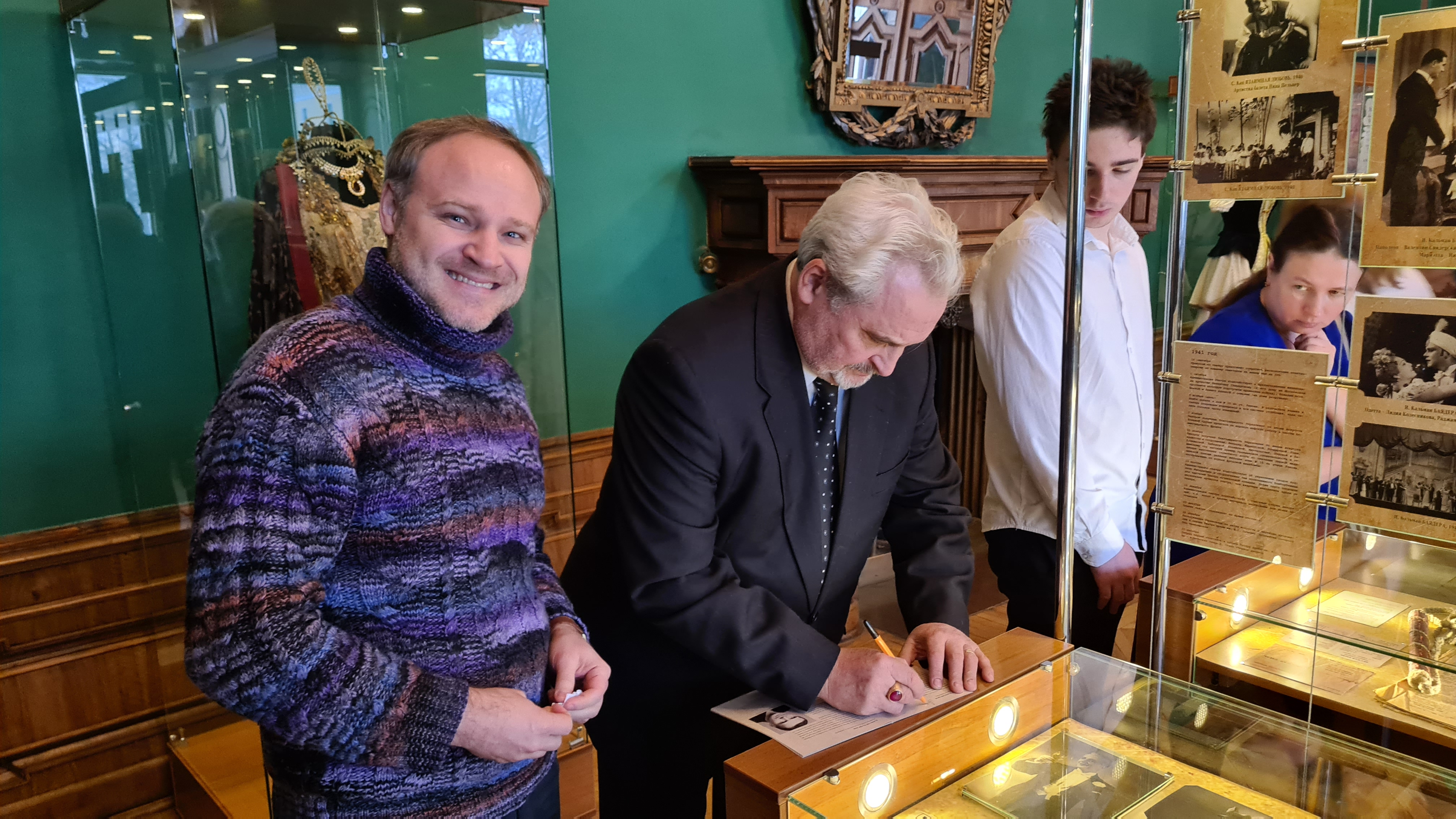
Alexandrov gives an autograph (2022)

Yuri Isaakovich Alexandrov (Russian: Ю́рий Исаа́кович Алекса́ндров; born February 7, 1950, Leningrad, RSFSR, USSR) is a Russian opera director. His 1999 production of Prokofiev's Semyon Kotko won The Golden Mask (Russia's highest theatre award) in the categories of "Best Opera Production", "Best Opera Director", "Best Opera Designer", and "Best Opera Conductor".

== Background ==
In 1974 Alexandrov graduated from the Leningrad Conservatory as a pianist, and in 1977 he graduated from the faculty of musical stage direction.

Since 1978 he has worked as a stage director at the Mariinsky Theatre, and in 1987 Alexandrov founded the Chamber Music Theatre. Initially conceived as a creative "laboratory", with time it developed into the professional Saint Petersburg Chamber Opera Company.

People's Artist of the Russian Federation (February 21, 2008) for great services in the field of art.
