= La Favorita (film) =

1952 Italian anthology film

- Directed by: Cesare Barlacchi
- Written by: Cesare Barlacchi
- Produced by: Luigi Mazzullo; Salvatori Strati
- Starring: Paolo Silveri; Sofia Lazzaro (Loren); Gino Sinimberghi; Alfredo Colella
- Music by: Alessandro Cicognini
- Release date: 1952 (Italy)
- Country: Italy
- Language: Italian

La Favorita (Italian: La favorita) is a 1952 Italian anthology film directed by Cesare Barlacchi. It was from the opera of the same name by Gaetano Donizetti. The film was made when Sophia Loren was being credited professionally as Sofia Lazzaro and she plays the part of Leonora. Fernando is the son of Baldassarre and has become fond of Leonora.

== Plot ==
Baldassarre's daughter has married the king of Castile, Alfonso XI, who took Leonora as his favourite. When Alfonso wins a battle against the Arabs, he offers Fernando a reward, and Fernando asks to marry Leonora. The king orders their marriage, after which Fernand learns of Leonara's past and, feeling dishonoured, retreats to the monastery. Leonora visits Fernando who is moved by her entreatments and is willing to accept her, but Leonora dies from exhaustion.

== Cast ==
- Gino Sinimberghi as Fernando
- Sofia Lazzaro (Loren) as Leonora di Guzman
- Paolo Silveri as King Alfonso XI of Castile
- Alfredo Colella as Baldassarre, superior of the convent of Saint James of Compostela
