= Tosca (1956 film) =

- Directed by: Carmine Gallone
- Written by: Giuseppe Giacosa (libretto); Luigi Illica (libretto); Victorien Sardou (play)
- Produced by: Giulio Fiaschi; Carmine Gallone; Guido Luzzatto; Manlio Morelli
- Starring: Franca Duval; Franco Corelli; Vito De Taranto; Afro Poli
- Cinematography: Giuseppe Rotunno
- Edited by: Niccolò Lazzari
- Music by: Giacomo Puccini (opera)
- Production company: Produzione Gallone
- Distributed by: CEI Incom
- Release date: 26 August 1956
- Running time: 110 minutes
- Country: Italy
- Language: Italian

Tosca is a 1956 Italian musical melodrama film directed by Carmine Gallone and starring Franca Duval, Afro Poli and Franco Corelli. It is based on the 1900 opera Tosca by Giacomo Puccini, which was adapted from the 1887 play by Victorien Sardou. It was made at Cinecittà in Rome.

== Cast ==
- Franca Duval as Floria Tosca
- Franco Corelli as Mario Cavaradossi
- Afro Poli as Baron Scarpia, chief of police
- Vito De Taranto as The Sacristan
- Fernando Alfieri as Spoletta, police official
- Antonio Sacchetti as Cesare Angelotti
- Aldo Corelli as Sciarrone, a gendarme
- Dino Conti as The Jailkeeper
- Maria Caniglia as Floria Tosca (singing voice)
- Giangiacomo Guelfi as Baron Scarpia, chief of police (singing voice)

== Bibliography ==
- Goble, Alan. The Complete Index to Literary Sources in Film. Walter de Gruyter, 1999.
