= I Pagliacci (1915 film) =

- Directed by: Francesco Bertolini
- Written by: Ruggero Leoncavallo (opera)
- Production company: Mediolanum Film
- Distributed by: Mediolanum Film
- Release date: June 1915
- Country: Italy
- Languages: Silent; Italian intertitles

I Pagliacci is a 1915 Italian silent drama film directed by Francesco Bertolini. It is based on the 1892 opera Pagliacci by Ruggero Leoncavallo.

== Cast ==
- Bianca Virginia Camagni
- Paolo Colaci
- Giulia Costa
- Annibale Ninchi
- Achille Vitti
- Umberto Zanuccoli

== Bibliography ==
- Goble, Alan. The Complete Index to Literary Sources in Film. Walter de Gruyter, 1999.
