= The Lady of the Camellias (1947 film) =

- Promotional film poster
- Italian: La signora dalle camelie
- Directed by: Carmine Gallone
- Written by: Hamilton Benz; Francesco Maria Piave (libretto)
- Produced by: Gregor Rabinovitch; William A. Szekeley
- Starring: Nelly Corradi; Gino Mattera; Manfredi Polverosi
- Cinematography: Arturo Gallea
- Edited by: Niccolò Lazzari
- Music by: Luigi Ricci; Giuseppe Verdi
- Production company: Grandi Film Storici Cinopera
- Distributed by: Columbia Pictures (US)
- Release date: 22 December 1947
- Running time: 82 minutes
- Country: Italy
- Language: Italian

The Lady of the Camellias (Italian: La signora dalle camelie) is a 1947 Italian musical drama film directed by Carmine Gallone and starring Nelly Corradi, Gino Mattera and Manfredi Polverosi. It is an adaptation of the 1853 opera La traviata by Giuseppe Verdi. In 1948 it was released in America by Columbia Pictures under the title The Lost One.

The film's sets were designed by the art director Gastone Medin. Costume design was by Georges Annenkov.

== Cast ==
- Nelly Corradi as Violetta Valery
- Gino Mattera as Alfredo Germont
- Manfredi Polverosi as Giorgio Germont
- Flora Marino as Flora Bervoix
- Carlo Lombardi as Baron Douphol
- Massimo Serato as Alexandre Dumas fils (prologue)
- Nerio Bernardi as Giuseppe Verdi (prologue)
- Onelia Fineschi as Violetta Valery (singing voice)
- Tito Gobbi as Giorgio Germont (singing voice)
- Francesco Albanese as singing voice
- Arturo la Porta as singing voice

== Bibliography ==
- Goble, Alan (1999). The Complete Index to Literary Sources in Film. Walter de Gruyter. ISBN 3598114923.
