= Parsifal (1904 film) =

1904 film by Edwin S. Porter

Parsifal is a 1904 American silent film produced by the Edison Manufacturing Company and directed by Edwin S. Porter. It is based on the 1882 opera Parsifal by Richard Wagner, and stars Adelaide Fitz-Allen as Kundry and Robert Whittier as Parsifal.

== Production and release ==
In 1903, Wagner's widow unsuccessfully attempted to stop a performance of Parsifal by the Metropolitan Opera in New York, causing great scandal. In 1904, Harley Merry acquired the motion picture rights and brought on Porter and Edison. Edison had been experimenting with ways to combine silent films with recorded music. Porter's version of Parsifal employed Edison's Kinetophone, "a primitive, synchronized sound-mix device, but this machine does not represent the era of silent film, since it had a short life with no great success."

Despite a strong advertising campaign, sales were modest.
