= Italo Tajo =

Italian opera singer

Italo Tajo (photo with dedication)

Italo Tajo as Basilio in The Barber of Seville, Teatro alla Scala, Milan, 1942.

Italo Tajo (25 April 1915 – 28 March 1993) was an Italian operatic bass, particularly acclaimed for his Mozart and Rossini roles.

Tajo was born in Pinerolo, Piedmont, Italy and studied violin and voice at the Music Conservatory of Turin with Nilde Stichi-Bertozzi. He made his stage debut in 1935, as Fafner (Das Rheingold), under Fritz Busch. At Busch's invitation, he followed him to Glyndebourne, where he became a member of the chorus, also appearing in comprimario roles.

In 1939, he returned to Italy, where he became a member of the Rome Opera, in 1942 taking part in the Italian premiere of Berg's Wozzeck. In 1940, he joined the Teatro alla Scala in Milan, where he sang regularly until 1956. He appeared with the Maggio Musicale Fiorentino in 1942, as Leporello in Don Giovanni, a role he would sing numerous times during his career. In 1961, the bass performed in the world premiere of Luigi Nono's Intolleranza 1960, in Venice.

The war over, his career quickly took an international turn, with debuts in Paris, London, Edinburgh and Buenos Aires. In 1946, he made his debut at the Chicago Opera Company, and 1948 saw his debut at both the San Francisco Opera and Metropolitan Opera in New York (Don Basilio in The Barber of Seville, with Giuseppe Valdengo); his other roles at the Met included Figaro, Leporello, Don Basilio, Dulcamara, Don Pasquale and Gianni Schicchi.

Although he made a specialty of comic roles, he sang a fair number of dramatic roles, notably Verdi's Attila and Banco, and Mussorgsky's Boris Godunov. He also created Samuel in Darius Milhaud's David, as well as roles in operas by Berio, Lualdi, Malipiero and Nono. In 1953, he appeared at the Teatro Comunale Florence as Count Rostov and Field-Marshal Kutuzov in the near-complete Italian-language premiere of Prokofiev's War and Peace.

In 1957, he replaced Ezio Pinza in the role of Emile de Becque in the musical South Pacific on Broadway, later also appearing in Kiss Me, Kate.

In 1966, he began teaching at the University of Cincinnati, where he was largely responsible for the establishment of an opera workshop. Two of his notable pupils were soprano Kathleen Battle and baritone Tom Fox. He continued singing until well into his seventies, mostly at the Metropolitan Opera in character roles such as Geronte, Benoit, Alcindoro, and the Sacristan. His last stage appearance was at the Met as the Sacristan in Tosca in 1991.

Tajo made relatively few recordings, the most famous being the acclaimed 1950 RCA Victor Rigoletto, with Leonard Warren, Erna Berger and Jan Peerce, conducted by Renato Cellini. He also recorded The Marriage of Figaro and Don Giovanni for Cetra. Tajo can be heard in live broadcasts of Macbeth, opposite Maria Callas, conducted by Victor de Sabata; and the Florence War and Peace.

In the late 1940s, Tajo appeared in film versions of The Barber of Seville, L'elisir d'amore, and Lucia di Lammermoor, as well as in television productions such as Don Pasquale in 1955, released as a Hardy Classic Video (DVD).

As a special guest, Tajo sang an excerpt from Don Pasquale during the Metropolitan Opera Centennial Celebration in October 1983. In 1988, he appeared in Francesca Zambello's production of La bohème, as Benoit and Alcindoro, which was a film of a San Francisco Opera production starring Mirella Freni and Luciano Pavarotti. It was released on Kultur video.

Tajo died in Cincinnati, Ohio in 1993, at the age of 77.

== Filmography ==
- The Barber of Seville (1947)
- The Legend of Faust (1949)

== Sources ==
- Le guide de l'opéra, les indispensables de la musique, R. Mancini & J-J. Rouvereux, (Fayard, 1986), ISBN 2-213-01563-5
