= Pagliacci (1948 film) =

- Original poster for Pagliacci, 1948
- Directed by: Mario Costa
- Written by: Carlo Castelli, Mario Costa
- Produced by: Alberto Giacalone, Leopoldo Imperiali
- Starring: Tito Gobbi and Gina Lollobrigida
- Cinematography: Mario Bava
- Edited by: Otello Colangeli
- Distributed by: Itala Film
- Release date: 1948
- Running time: 81 minutes
- Country: Italy
- Language: Italian

Love of a Clown, or Pagliacci, is a 1948 Italian film based on Ruggero Leoncavallo's opera Pagliacci, directed by Mario Costa. The film stars Tito Gobbi and Gina Lollobrigida. It recounts the tragedy of Canio, the lead clown (or pagliaccio in Italian) in a commedia dell'arte troupe, his wife Nedda, and her lover, Silvio. When Nedda spurns the advances of Tonio, another player in the troupe, he tells Canio about Nedda's betrayal. In a jealous rage Canio murders both Nedda and Silvio. The only actor in the cast who also sang his role was the celebrated Italian baritone, Tito Gobbi, but the film is largely very faithful to its source material, presenting the opera nearly complete.

The film premiered on 16 April 1950 in the USA. It is notable for having been filmed largely in outdoor settings, much like a big-budgeted film version of a Broadway musical.

== Cast ==
- Tito Gobbi as Tonio, the hunchback / Silvio
- Gina Lollobrigida as Nedda, wife of Canio
- Onelia Fineschi as Nedda (singing voice)
- Afro Poli as Canio, master of the troupe
- Galliano Masini as Canio (singing voice)
- Filippo Morucci as Beppe, troupe harlequin
- Gino Sinimberghi as Beppe (singing voice)

== Sources ==
- Pagliacci at IMDb
