= La Bohème (1965 film) =

1965 film

- Directed by: Wilhelm Semmelroth; Franco Zeffirelli (Production Designer, Director)
- Written by: Giuseppe Giacosa; Luigi Illica
- Based on: Scènes de la vie de bohème (1847–49) novel by Henri Murger
- Produced by: Herbert von Karajan (Conductor)
- Starring: Mirella Freni; Gianni Raimondi
- Cinematography: Wilhelm Semmelroth
- Edited by: Alice Seedorf
- Music by: Giacomo Puccini
- Production company: Cosmotel
- Distributed by: Warner Bros. Pictures (US); Deutsche Grammophon (video formats)
- Release date: 6 December 1965
- Running time: 105 minutes
- Country: West Germany
- Language: Italian

La Bohème is a 1965 West German film production of the 1896 opera of the same name by Puccini, filmed in a Milan studio and recorded at the Munich Opera. The film director and producer and set designer was the Italian director Franco Zeffirelli; Herbert von Karajan conducted the chorus and orchestra of La Scala and was the artistic supervisor. This is not a stage live recording: the singers mime to their own pre-recordings.

Deutsche Grammophon released the film for home media in analog VHS tape format in 1988 and in Digital Video Disc (DVD) format in 1996, 2002 and 2006.

== Cast ==
- Mirella Freni (soprano) as Mimì
- Gianni Raimondi (tenor) as Rodolfo, a poet
- Adriana Martino (soprano) as Musetta
- Rolando Panerai (baritone) as Marcello, a painter
- Gianni Maffeo (baritone) as Schaunard, a musician
- Ivo Vinco (baritone) as Colline, a philosopher
