= Franca Duval =

American opera singer (1925–2020)

- Franca Duval in Manon (photo with dedication)
- Occupation: opera soprano singer

Franca Duval (13 February 1925 - 21 July 2020) was an American soprano.

== Biography ==
Born in New York City to parents who had immigrated from Italy, Duval began her career in San Francisco. In 1950 she appeared at La Scala in Raskolnikoff by Heinrich Sutermeister; she remained a member of that company for several years, singing roles such as Zerlina and Blonde and substituting at times for both Maria Callas and Renata Tebaldi as Violetta in La traviata. From 1957 she sang much in France, appearing in cities such as Lille, Nice, Rouen, Vichy, and Paris (1959–60, at the Opéra-Comique) as well as Algiers (1957–58). With Franco Corelli, she appeared in the title role of a 1956 film adaptation of Tosca by RAI; her voice was dubbed for the film by Maria Caniglia, reputedly because Tosca was a role which she had yet not sung professionally; she added it to her repertory in Santa Fe in 1960. Duval is closely associated with the title role in Gian-Carlo Menotti's opera Maria Golovin, which she created for Brussels in 1958. She sang the role on Broadway as well, and appeared on the original cast recording and in the NBC Opera Theatre production in 1959. After her singing career she started teaching singing.

She married Carlo Nell, and they lived together in Paris until Carlo's death in 2016. She died on 21 July 2020 in Paris.
