= The Force of Destiny (film) =

- Directed by: Carmine Gallone
- Written by: Mario Corsi; Ottavio Poggi; Lionello De Felice; Francesco Maria Piave (libretto); Duque de Rivas
- Starring: Nelly Corradi; Tito Gobbi; Gino Sinimberghi
- Cinematography: Aldo Giordani
- Edited by: Niccolò Lazzari
- Music by: Giuseppe Verdi (opera)
- Production company: Produzione Gallone
- Distributed by: Union Film
- Release date: 24 January 1950
- Running time: 100 minutes
- Country: Italy
- Language: Italian

The Force of Destiny (Italian: La forza del destino) is a 1950 Italian musical melodrama film directed by Carmine Gallone and starring Nelly Corradi, Tito Gobbi and Gino Sinimberghi. It is based on Giuseppe Verdi's opera La forza del destino.

The film's sets were designed by the art director Gastone Medin.

== Cast ==
- Nelly Corradi as Donna Leonora
- Gino Sinimberghi as Don Alvaro
- Tito Gobbi as Don Carlos
- Giulio Neri as Padre Guardiano
- Vito De Taranto as Frà Melitone
- Mira Vargas as Preziosilla
- John Kitzmiller as Lo scudiero moro
- Fausto Tommei as Il marchese di Calatrava
- Giuseppe Varni as Il pellegrino caritatevole
- Nerio Bernardi as Don Angelo Saavedra
- Paola Dalgas as Dana
- Pina Piovani as Cameriera di Leonora
- Giovanni Onorato as Giocatore di Carte
- Silvana Pampanini
- Galliano Masini as Don Alvaro (voice)
- Caterina Mancini as Donna Leonora (voice)
- Cloe Elmo as Preziosilla (voice)

== Bibliography ==
- Aprà, Adriano. The Fabulous Thirties: Italian Cinema 1929–1944. Electa International, 1979.
