= Helikon Opera =

Russian opera company based in Moscow

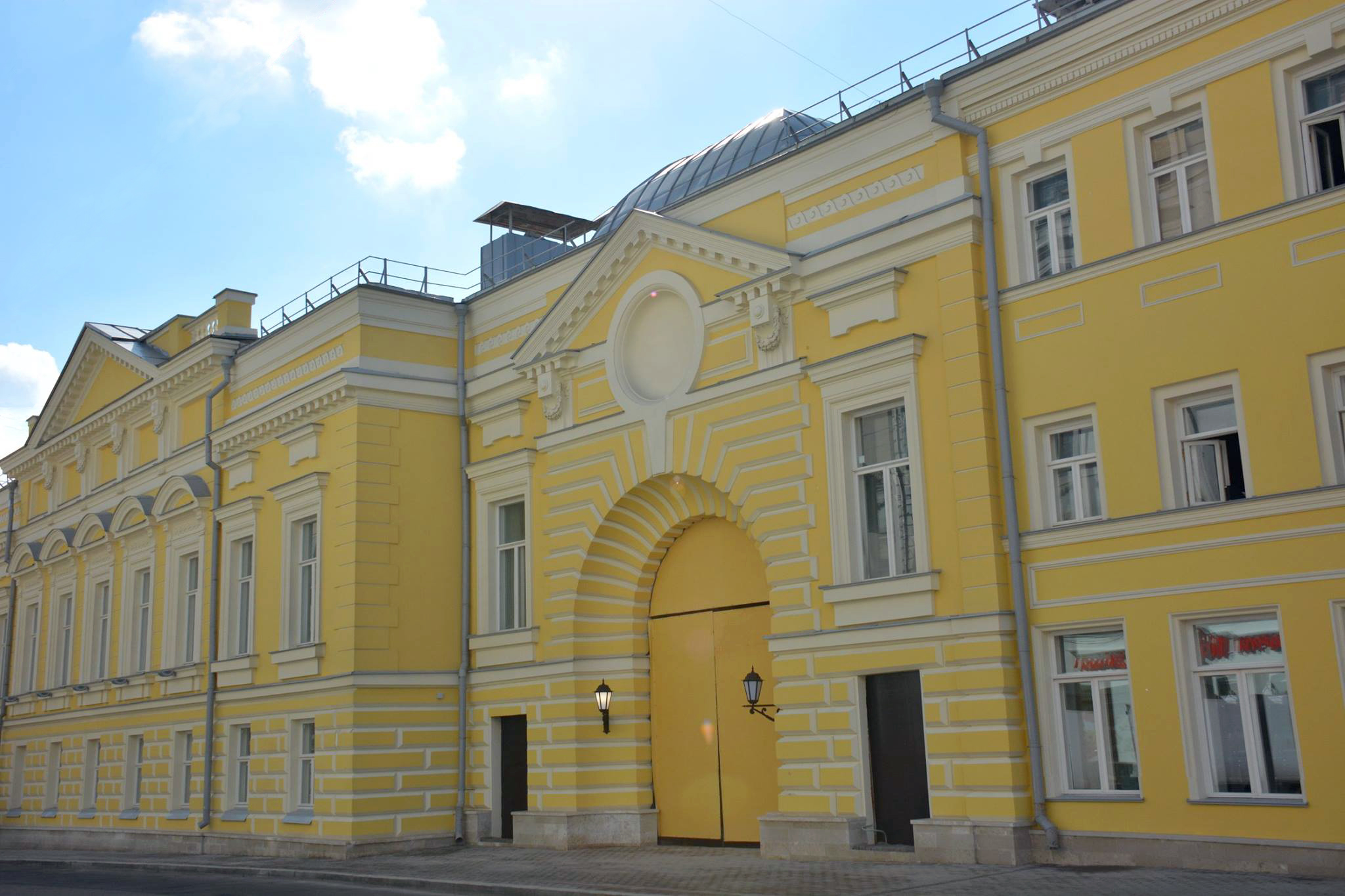
The Shakhovsky-Glebov-Streshnev Estate where the Helikon Opera is based

Helikon Opera is a Russian opera company based in Moscow, specializing in unconventional productions. Their main performing base is the 250 seat Mayakovsky Theater, the former ballroom in the palace of the Shakhovskoi-Glebov-Streshneva family who were patrons of the arts in 19th century Moscow. The company was founded by Dmitry Bertman and gave its first performance, Stravinsky's Mavra, on April 10, 1990.

Helikon Opera gives 200 performances a year, primarily in Moscow but also abroad, performing in the UK for the first time in 1997. The company's repertoire includes both mainstream works and rarely performed operas and chamber operas. In the past they have staged Fleishman's Rothschild's Violin, Hindemith's Hin und zurück and Prokofiev's Maddalena and were the first company to revive Tchaikovsky's Undine (1994) and to stage Prokofiev's The Ugly Duckling (1992).
