= Pagliacci (1931 film) =

1931 film

- Directed by: Joe W. Coffman
- Written by: Ruggero Leoncavallo (libretto)
- Produced by: Fortune Gallo
- Cinematography: Al Wilson
- Edited by: Joe W. Coffman
- Production company: Audio Cinema
- Distributed by: Leo Brecher
- Release date: February 20, 1931
- Running time: 70 minutes
- Country: United States
- Language: Italian

Pagliacci is a 1931 American musical film directed by Joe W. Coffman and starring Fernando Bertini, Alba Novella and Mario Valle. It is a filmed version of a stage performance of the opera Pagliacci by Ruggero Leoncavallo.

== Cast ==
- Fernando Bertini as Canio / Pagliaccio
- Alba Novella as Nedda / Columbina
- Mario Valle as Tonio / Taddeo
- Francesco Curci as Beppe / Arlecchino
- Giuseppe Inter rants as Silvio
- The San Carlo Grand Opera Company as Ensemble
- The San Carlo Symphony Orchestra as Orchestra

== Bibliography ==
- Goble, Alan. The Complete Index to Literary Sources in Film. Walter de Gruyter, 1999.
