= La bohème discography =

This is a list of audio and video recordings (discography) of Giacomo Puccini's opera La bohème which premiered on 1 February 1896 at the Teatro Regio in Turin, conducted by Arturo Toscanini.

== Audio recordings ==
Year	Cast (Mimì, Musetta, Rodolfo, Marcello, Colline, Schaunard)	Conductor, Opera house and orchestra	Label
1917	Gemma Bosini; Adalgisa Giana; Reno Andreini; Ernesto Badini; Vincenzo Bettoni; Aristide Baracchi	Carlo Sabajno; Teatro alla Scala orchestra and chorus	LP: Società Nazionale del Grammofono; Cat: S 5018-42
1928	Rosetta Pampanini; Luba Mirella; Luigi Marini; Gino Vanelli; Tancredi Pasero; Aristide Baracchi	Lorenzo Molajoli; Teatro alla Scala orchestra and chorus	CD: Arkadia; Cat: 78047
1928	Rosina Torri; Thea Vitulli; Aristodemo Giorgini; Ernesto Badini; Luigi Manfrini; Aristide Baracchi	Carlo Sabajno; Teatro alla Scala orchestra and chorus	CD: VAI Audio; Cat: VAIA 1078-2
1938	Licia Albanese; Tatiana Menotti; Beniamino Gigli; Afro Poli; Duilio Baronti; Aristide Baracchi	Umberto Berrettoni; Teatro alla Scala orchestra and chorus	CD: Naxos Historical; Cat: 8.110072-73
1942	Grace Moore; Frances Greer; Frederick Jagel; Francesco Valentino; Ezio Pinza; Wilfred Engelman	Cesare Sodero; Metropolitan Opera orchestra and chorus	CD: Line Music; Cat: 5.00284
1946	Licia Albanese; Anne McKnight; Jan Peerce; Francesco Valentino; Nicola Moscona; George Cehanovsky	Arturo Toscanini; NBC Symphony orchestra and chorus	LP: RCA Victrola; Cat: VIC-6019 CD: RCA Victor; Cat: 60288
1947	Bidu Sayão; Mimi Benzell; Richard Tucker; Francesco Valentino; Nicola Moscona; George Cehanovsky	Giuseppe Antonicelli; Metropolitan Opera orchestra and chorus	CD: Arkadia; Cat: 78068
1951	Renata Tebaldi; Hilde Güden; Giacinto Prandelli; Giovanni Inghilleri; Raffaele Arié; Fernando Corena	Alberto Erede; Accademia Nazionale di Santa Cecilia orchestra and chorus	CD: Naxos; Cat: 8.110252-53
1952	Rosanna Carteri; Elvina Ramella; Ferruccio Tagliavini; Giuseppe Taddei; Cesare Siepi; Pier Luigi Latinucci	Gabriele Santini; RAI Orchestra Sinfonica and chorus	CD: Warner Fonit; Cat: 8573 87270-2
1956	Victoria de los Ángeles; Lucine Amara; Jussi Björling; Robert Merrill; Giorgio Tozzi; John Reardon	Thomas Beecham; RCA Victor Symphony Orchestra and chorus	LP: RCA Victor; Cat: LM-6042; CD: EMI Classics; Cat: 7243-5-67753-2-9; CD: Naxos; Cat: 8.111249-50
1956	Maria Callas; Anna Moffo; Giuseppe Di Stefano; Rolando Panerai; Nicola Zaccaria; Manuel Spatafora	Antonino Votto; Teatro alla Scala orchestra and chorus	CD: Naxos; Cat: 8.111332-33
1958	Licia Albanese; Laurel Hurley; Carlo Bergonzi; Mario Sereni; Clifford Harvuot; Norman Scott	Thomas Schippers; Metropolitan Opera orchestra and chorus (Recorded on 15 February 1958)	CD: Sony Classical; Cat: 88697804632
1958	Renata Tebaldi; Gianna D'Angelo; Carlo Bergonzi; Ettore Bastianini; Cesare Siepi; Renato Cesari	Tullio Serafin; Accademia Nazionale di Santa Cecilia orchestra and chorus	CD: Decca; Cat: 470 431-2
1959	Licia Albanese; Audrey Schuh; Giuseppe Di Stefano; Giuseppe Valdengo; Norman Treigle; Arthur Cosenza	Renato Cellini; New Orleans Opera Association orchestra and chorus	CD: VAI; Cat: VAIA 1119-2
1961	Anna Moffo; Mary Costa; Richard Tucker; Robert Merrill; Giorgio Tozzi; Philip Maero	Erich Leinsdorf; Rome Opera orchestra and chorus	LP: RCA Victor; Cat: LSC-6095; CD: RCA Victor; Cat: 09026-63179-2
1961	Renata Scotto; Jolanda Meneguzzer; Gianni Poggi; Tito Gobbi; Giuseppe Modesti; Giorgio Giorgetti	Antonino Votto; Maggio Musicale Fiorentino orchestra and chorus	CD: Deutsche Grammophon; Cat: 435 715-2
1962– 1963	Mirella Freni; Mariella Adani; Nicolai Gedda; Mario Sereni; Ferruccio Mazzoli; Mario Basiola, Jr.	Thomas Schippers; Rome Opera orchestra and chorus	CD: EMI Classics; Cat: 91998
1963	Mirella Freni; Hilde Güden; Gianni Raimondi; Rolando Panerai; Ivo Vinco; Giuseppe Taddei	Herbert von Karajan; Vienna State Opera orchestra and chorus ORF live recording	CD: RCA Red Seal; Cat: 74321 57736 2
1972	Mirella Freni; Elizabeth Harwood; Luciano Pavarotti; Rolando Panerai; Nicolai Ghiaurov; Gianni Maffeo	Herbert von Karajan; Berlin Philharmonic orchestra Deutsche Oper Berlin chorus	CD: Decca; Cat: 421245
1973	Montserrat Caballé; Judith Blegen; Plácido Domingo; Sherrill Milnes; Ruggero Raimondi; Vicente Sardinero	Georg Solti; London Philharmonic Orchestra; John Alldis Choir	LP: RCA Red Seal; Cat: ARL2-0371; CD: RCA Victor; Cat: 74321 39496-2
1979	Katia Ricciarelli; Ashley Putnam; José Carreras; Francis Egerton; Håkan Hagegård; Robert Lloyd	Colin Davis; Royal Opera House orchestra and chorus	CD: Philips Records; Cat: 4422602
1979	Ileana Cotrubaș; Lucia Popp; Luciano Pavarotti; Lorenzo Saccomani; Yevgeny Nesterenko; Giorgio Giorgetti	Carlos Kleiber; Teatro alla Scala orchestra and chorus (Recorded on 27 March 1979)	CD: Myto; Cat: 011 240 (see video below)
1983	Mirella Freni; Margherita Guglielmi; Luciano Pavarotti; Wolfgang Brendel; Jan-Hendrik Rootering; John Janssen	Carlos Kleiber; Bavarian State Opera orchestra and chorus (Recorded on 16 July 1983 at National Theatre Munich)	CD: Audio Encyclopedia; Cat: AE204
1987	Barbara Hendricks, Angela Maria Blasi, José Carreras, Gino Quilico, Francesco Ellero d'Artegna, Richard Cowan	James Conlon, Orchestre National de France, Chorus of Radio France (Recorded May 1987, Grand Auditorium, Radio France; used for the soundtrack to La Bohème (1988 film))	CD: Erato; Cat: 2292-45311-2 (see 1988 video below)
1987	Angelina Reaux; Barbara Daniels; Jerry Hadley; Thomas Hampson; James Busterud; Paul Plishka	Leonard Bernstein; Accademia Nazionale di Santa Cecilia orchestra and chorus	CD: Deutsche Grammophon; Cat: 423 601-2
1990	Daniela Dessì; Adelina Scarabelli; Giuseppe Sabbatini; Paolo Gavanelli; Carlo Colombara; Alfonso Antoniozzi	Gianluigi Gelmetti; Teatro Comunale di Bologna orchestra and chorus	CD: EMI Classics; Cat: 74321 39496-2
1995	Kiri Te Kanawa; Nancy Gustafson; Richard Leech; Alan Titus; Roberto Scanduzzi; Gino Quilico	Kent Nagano; London Symphony Orchestra; Ambrosian Singers, St Clement Danes School Choir	CD: Erato Records; Cat: 0630-1-10699-2
1998	Angela Gheorghiu; Elisabetta Scano; Roberto Alagna; Simon Keenlyside; Ildebrando D'Arcangelo; Roberto De Candia	Riccardo Chailly; Teatro alla Scala orchestra and chorus	CD: Decca; Cat: 470 624-2 DSA
1999	Barbara Frittoli; Eva Mei; Andrea Bocelli; Paolo Gavanelli; Mario Luperi; Natale de Carolis	Zubin Mehta; Israel Philharmonic Orchestra	CD: Decca; Cat: 470 62435782
2007	Anna Netrebko; Nicole Cabell; Rolando Villazón; Boaz Daniel; Vitalij Kowaljow; Stéphane Degout	Bertrand de Billy; Bavarian Radio Symphony Orchestra (Recorded in concert at Münchner Philharmonie in April 2007; used for the soundtrack to La Bohème (2008 film))	CD: Deutsche Grammophon; Cat: 477 6600 (see 2008 video below)
2022	Celine Byrne; Anna Devin; Merūnas Vitulskis; David Bizic; John Molloy; Ben McAteer	Sergio Alapont; Irish National Opera; Irish National Opera Chorus	CD: Signum Classics; Reference: 0000702SIGCD

== Video recordings ==
Year	Cast (Mimì, Musetta, Rodolfo, Marcello, Colline, Schaunard)	Conductor, Opera house and orchestra (production details)	Label
1960	Léna Pastor, Irène Gromova, Alain Vanzo, Willy Clément, Xavier Depraz, Jean-Pierre Laffage	Georges Derveaux, Orchestre radio-lyrique, RTF (sung in French, translation by Paul Ferrier)	DVD: Fra Musica; Cat: INA FRA010
1965	Mirella Freni, Adriana Martino, Gianni Raimondi, Rolando Panerai, Ivo Vinco, Gianni Maffeo	Herbert von Karajan, Teatro alla Scala Orchestra & Chorus (A 1965 film designed and directed by Franco Zeffirelli; cinematographer: Wilhelm Semmelroth)	Film: Cosmotel; VHS/DVD: Deutsche Grammophon
1977	Renata Scotto, Maralin Niska, Luciano Pavarotti, Ingvar Wixell, Paul Plishka, Allan Monk	James Levine, Metropolitan Opera Orchestra & Chorus (Production: Fabrizio Melano; set design: Pier Luigi Pizzi; recorded live, 15 March)	Streaming video: Met Opera on Demand
1979	Ileana Cotrubaș, Lucia Popp, Luciano Pavarotti, Lorenzo Saccomani, Yevgeny Nesterenko, Giorgio Giorgetti	Carlos Kleiber, Teatro alla Scala Orchestra & Chorus (Recorded on 30 March 1979)	DVD: Encore; Cat: 2144 (see audio above)
1982	Teresa Stratas, Renata Scotto, José Carreras, Richard Stillwell, James Morris, Allan Monk	James Levine, Metropolitan Opera Orchestra & Chorus (Production: Franco Zeffirelli; recorded live, 16 January)	Streaming video: Met Opera on Demand
1986	Fiamma Izzo d'Amico, Madelyn Renee, Luciano Pavarotti, Roberto Servile, Francesco Ellero d'Artegna, Jeffrey Mattsey	Leone Magiera, Genoa Opera Orchestra & Chorus (Recorded live, Tianquiao Theatre, Beijing)	DVD: Kultur
1988	Barbara Hendricks, Angela Maria Blasi, Luca Canonici, Gino Quilico, Francesco Ellero d'Artegna, Richard Cowan	James Conlon, Orchestre National de France, Chorus of Radio France (La Bohème (1988 film) directed by Luigi Comencini; cinematographer: Armando Nannuzzi)	Film: Gaumont; HD video: Erato (see 1987 audio above)
1988	Mirella Freni, Sandra Pacetti, Luciano Pavarotti, Gino Quilico, Nicolai Ghiaurov, Stephen Dickson	Tiziano Severini, San Francisco Opera Orchestra & Chorus (Recorded live, War Memorial Opera House)	DVD: Kultur, Arthaus Musik
1993	Cheryl Barker, Christine Douglas, David Hobson, Roger Lemke, Gary Rowley, David Lemke	Julian Smith, The Australian Opera Orchestra & Chorus (Recorded live, Sydney Opera House live,Richard Gill (choir master), sound production by Christopher Lawrence, directed by Baz Luhrmann, design by Catherine Martin)	DVD: Arthaus Musik; Cat: 100954
2002	Alexia Voulgaridou, Elena de la Merced, Rolando Villazón, Ludovic Tézier, Markus Marquardt, Toby Stafford-Allen	Ulf Schirmer, Vienna Symphony (Recorded at Bregenzer Festspiele in 2002)	DVD: Capriccio Digital; Cat: 93 515
2006	Inva Mula, Laura Giordano, Aquiles Machado, Fabio Capitanucci, Felipe Bou, David Menéndez	Jesús López-Cobos, Teatro Real Orchestra & Chorus	DVD: Opus Arte; Cat: OA0961D
2008	Anna Netrebko, Nicole Cabell, Rolando Villazón, George von Bergen, Vitalij Kowaljow, Adrian Eröd	Bertrand de Billy, Bavarian Radio Symphony Orchestra (La Bohème (2008 film) directed by Robert Dornhelm)	Film: Unitel Classica, MR-Film; DVD: Kultur; Cat: KUL D4601 (see 2007 audio above)
2008	Angela Gheorghiu, Ainhoa Arteta, Ramón Vargas, Ludovic Tézier, Oren Gradus, Quinn Kelsey	Nicola Luisotti, Metropolitan Opera Orchestra & Chorus (Production: Franco Zeffirelli; recorded live, 5 April)	HD video: Met Opera on Demand
2011	Takesha Meshé Kizart, Taryn Fiebig, Ji-Min Park, José Carbó, David Parkin, Shane Lowrencev	Shao-Chia Lü, Opera Australia Orchestra & Chorus (Directed by Gale Edwards; recorded live at the Sidney Opera House on 25 and 28 July)	DVD: ABC Classics, Cat: 762470; Blu-ray/DVD: Opera Australia
2014	Kristine Opolais, Susanna Phillips, Vittorio Grigolo, Massimo Cavalletti, Oren Gradus, Patrick Carfizzi	Stefano Ranzani, Metropolitan Opera Orchestra & Chorus (Production: Franco Zeffirelli; recorded live, 5 April)	HD video: Met Opera on Demand
2017	Nicole Car, Aida Garifullina, Atalla Ayan, Artur Ruciński, Roberto Tagliavini, Alessio Arduini	Gustavo Dudamel, Paris Opera Orchestra & Chorus (Director: Claus Guth; recorded live, Opéra Bastille)	Full HD: Paris Opera Play
2018	Sonya Yoncheva, Susanna Phillips, Michael Fabiano, Lucas Meachem, Matthew Rose, Alexei Lavrov	Marco Armiliato, Metropolitan Opera Orchestra & Chorus (Production: Franco Zeffirelli; recorded live, 24 February)	HD video: Met Opera on Demand
2020	Sonya Yoncheva, Simona Mihai, Charles Castronovo, Andrzej Filończyk, Peter Kellner, Gyula Nagy	Emmanuel Villaume, The Royal Opera Orchestra & Chorus (Director: Richard Jones; recorded live, 29 January)	Royal Ballet & Opera Stream
2022	Yaritza Véliz, Vuvu Mpofu, Long Long, Daniel Scofield, Ivo Stanchev, Luthando Qave	Jordan de Souza, London Philharmonic Orchestra, Glyndebourne Chorus (Directed by Floris Visser; recorded live at Glyndebourne Opera House)	HD video: Glyndebourne Encore
2022	Ailyn Pérez, Danielle de Niese, Juan Diego Flórez, Andrey Zhilikhovsky, Michael Mofidian, Ross Ramgobin	Kevin John Edusei, The Royal Opera Orchestra & Chorus (Director: Richard Jones; recorded live, 22 October)	Royal Ballet & Opera Stream
2024	Juliana Grigoryan, Eleonora Bellocci, Vittorio Grigolo, Luca Micheletti, Alexander Vinogradov, Jan Antem	Daniel Oren, Arena di Verona Orchestra, Chorus, & Ballet (Directed by Alfonso Signorini; recorded live, July)	UHD HDR video: ZDF/Unitel
2025	Juliana Grigoryan, Heidi Stober, Freddie De Tommaso, Lucas Meachem, Jongmin Park, Sean Michael Plumb	Keri-Lynn Wilson, Metropolitan Opera Orchestra & Chorus (Production: Franco Zeffirelli; recorded live, 8 November)	HD video: Met Opera on Demand
