= Ying Huang (soprano) =

Chinese operatic soprano

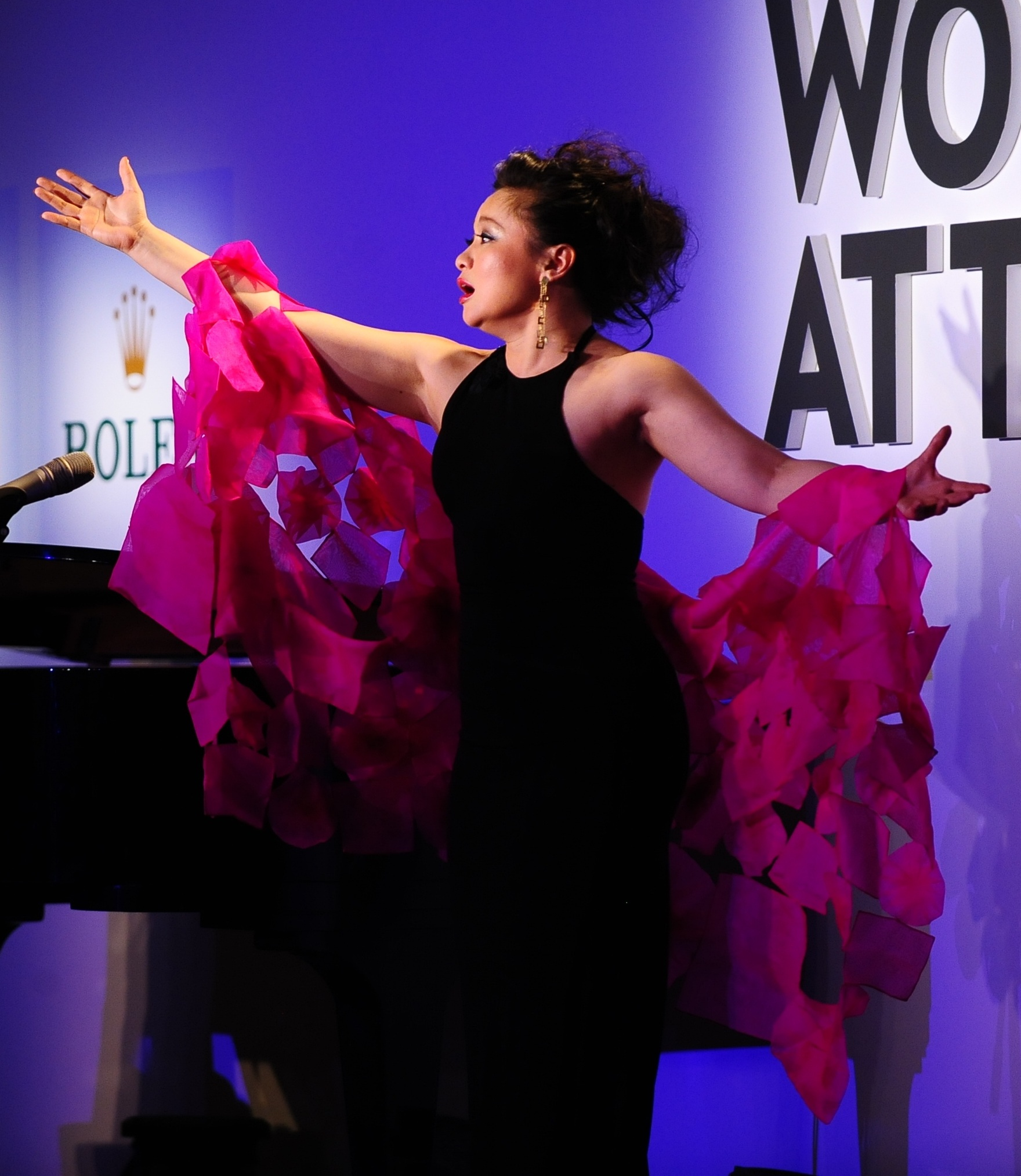
- Huang at FT Women at the Top in 2011.
- Born: 1968 (age 57–58); Shanghai, China
- Education: Shanghai Conservatory of Music
- Occupation: Singer

Chinese name
- Traditional Chinese: 黄英
- Simplified Chinese: 黄英
Transcriptions
Standard Mandarin
- Hanyu Pinyin: Huáng Yīng

Ying Huang (Chinese: 黄英; pinyin: Huáng Yīng; born 1968 in Shanghai) is a Chinese operatic soprano.

She first came to international attention when she sang the title role in Frédéric Mitterrand's 1995 film Madame Butterfly and has gone on to an international career both in opera and on the concert stage.

== Life and career ==
She was born and raised in Shanghai, and at 18 began five years of study at the Shanghai Conservatory of Music with Zhou Xiaoyan. After winning second prize in the 19th Concours International de Chant de Paris, she appeared regularly on Shanghai television and performed in Taiwan and North Korea in various cultural exchange programs. In 1994, director Frédéric Mitterrand and conductor James Conlon saw a video tape of her performance in the Paris Concours de Chant and auditioned her for the lead role in Mitterrand's film of Madame Butterfly. Her success in the film led to Conlon inviting her to perform in several concerts with the Cologne Philharmonic and to her operatic stage debut as Nannetta in Verdi's Falstaff at the Cologne Opera in 1996. That same year she appeared with Plácido Domingo and Michael Bolton in the Christmas in Vienna concert which was both televised and released on CD.

Her US operatic debut came in 1999 when she sang Sophie in Massenet's Werther opposite Denyce Graves and Andrea Bocelli at Michigan Opera Theater. She later returned to the Michigan Opera Theater to appear as Despina in Così fan tutte, as Norina in Don Pasquale and as Susanna in The Marriage of Figaro. She made her debut at the New York Metropolitan Opera on 29 December 2006 as Pamina in The Magic Flute, the first of its operas to simulcast in movie theaters, returning in 2009 as Amore in Orfeo ed Euridice and as Giannetta in L'elisir d'amore.

In 2013, Huang recorded the song "The Kiss" with the Chinese National Symphony Orchestra for the film Amazing. She performed the song with the orchestra as the opening act of 2013's Shanghai International Film Festival.

Ying Huang's world premiere performances include:

- Du Liniang in Tan Dun's Peony Pavilion at the Wiener Festwochen in Vienna (12 May 1998).
- Marianne and Marie Antoinette in Roger Waters' Ça Ira at the Parco della Musica in Rome (17 November 2005)
- The Moon in Guo Wenjing's Poet Li Bai at the Central City Opera Festival in Colorado (July 2007)
- Madame White Snake in Zhou Long's Madame White Snake at Opera Boston in Boston (February 2010)

== Recordings ==
- Merry Christmas From Vienna – Plácido Domingo, Michael Bolton, Ying Huang, Vienna Symphony Orchestra, Steven Mercurio (conductor). Label: Sony Classical 711325
- Richard Danielpour: Elegies; Sonnets to Orpheus – Ying Huang, Frederica Von Stade, Thomas Hampson, Perspectives Ensemble, London Philharmonic, Roger Nierenberg (conductor). Label: Sony Classical 60850
- Roger Waters: Ça Ira – Ying Huang, Bryn Terfel, Paul Groves, Rick Wentworth (conductor). Label: Sony Classical 60867
- Puccini: Madame Butterfly: Ying Huang, Richard Troxell, Richard Cowan, Liang Ning, Orchestre de Paris, James Conlon . Label: Sony Classical 69258
- Tan Dun: Bitter Love – a song cycle of excerpts from Peony Pavilion (opera) 1998

== Sources ==
- Chan, Wah Keung, "Bocelli Makes North American Operatic Debut", La Scena Musicale, Vol. 5, No. 4, December 1999.
- Kimberly, Nick, "Ready to spread her wings ", The Independent, 21 June 1997.
- MetOpera Database, Huang, Ying (Soprano)
- Riding, Alan "Ying Huang: A 'Butterfly' By Way Of Shanghai", The New York Times, 28 April 1996.
- Shulgold, Marc, "Daring opera triumphs", Rocky Mountain News, 11 July 2007
