= La bohème (disambiguation) =

La bohème is an 1896 opera by Giacomo Puccini.

La bohème may also refer to:

== Stage works ==
- La bohème (Leoncavallo), 1897 opera by Ruggero Leoncavallo
- La bohème (musical), Broadway musical adaptation originally staged in 1927

== Film ==
- La Bohème (1916 film), film adaptation by Albert Capellari
- La Bohème (1926 film), film adaptation by King Vidor
- La Vie de Bohème (1945 film), film adaptation by Marcel L'Herbier
- La Bohème (1965 film), film adaptation by Franco Zeffirelli
- La Bohème (1988 film), film adaptation by Luigi Comencini
- La Bohème (2008 film), film adaptation by Robert Dornhelm, with Anna Netrebko and Rolando Villazón
- La Bohème (2009 film), short film by Werner Herzog set to "O Soave Fanciulla"

== Music ==
- La Bohème (album), 1966 album by Charles Aznavour
  - "La Bohème" (Charles Aznavour song), 1965 song by Charles Aznavour
- Boheme (album), 1995 album by Deep Forest

== See also ==
- Labo M, pun on La bohème, 2003 album by French rock performer Matthieu Chedid, also known as -M-
- Bohemian (disambiguation)
- La Vie de Bohème (disambiguation)
- La Boheme Magazine
