= Vitulli =

Vitulli is a surname. It is the surname of:

- Christian Vitulli (born 1988), tennis player at the 2006 Wimbledon Championships – Boys' Singles
- Marie A. Vitulli, American mathematician
- Rocco Vitulli, one of the Lucchese crime family mobsters
- Thea Vitulli (born 1900), Argentine opera soprano in Belfagor and La Boheme
