= La Bohème (1988 film) =

- Film poster
- Directed by: Luigi Comencini
- Written by: Paola Comencini
- Based on: La bohème 1896 opera by Giacomo Puccini
- Produced by: Claude Abeille; Francis Brun-Buisson; Jérôme Clément; Massimo Patrizi; Daniel Toscan du Plantier
- Starring: Barbara Hendricks; Luca Canonici; Angela Maria Blasi; Gino Quilico; Francesco Ellero D'Artegna; Richard Cowan; Ciccio Ingrassia; Massimo Girotti; Mario Maranzana
- Cinematography: Armando Nannuzzi
- Edited by: Reine Wekstein; Sergio Buzi
- Music by: Giacomo Puccini
- Production companies: Gaumont; Rai 2 Erato Films
- Distributed by: Union Générale Cinématographique
- Release date: 9 March 1988
- Running time: 106 minutes
- Countries: Italy; France
- Language: Italian

La Bohème (also known as La bohème de Puccini) is a 1988 Italian-French film of an opera directed by Luigi Comencini. It is based on Giacomo Puccini's 1896 opera La bohème. James Conlon conducts the Orchestre National de France.

== Cast ==
- Barbara Hendricks as Mimì
- Luca Canonici as Rodolfo (dubbed by José Carreras)
- Angela Maria Blasi as Musetta
- Gino Quilico as Marcello
- Francesco Ellero D'Artegna as Colline
- Richard Cowan as Schaunard
- Ciccio Ingrassia as Parpignol (dubbed by Michel Sénéchal)
- Massimo Girotti as Alcindoro
- Mario Maranzana
