= La Vie de Bohème (disambiguation) =

La Vie de Bohème is an 1851 French novel by Henri Murger.

La Vie de Bohème may also refer to:

- La Bohème (1916 film)
- La Vie de Bohème (1945 film), French-Italian film from 1945
- La Vie de Bohème (1992 film), 1992 French film
- La Vie de Bohème (album), studio album by jazz pianist Dave Burrell
- "La Vie Bohème", a song from the musical Rent

== See also ==
- Bohemian (disambiguation)
- La bohème (disambiguation)
- La Vida Bohème, a Venezuelan band
