= Nicola Moscona =

Greek-born operatic bass

- Born: September 23, 1907
- Died: September 17, 1975 (aged 67)
- Occupation: Operatic bass

Nicola Moscona (September 23, 1907 – September 17, 1975) was a Greek-born operatic bass and voice teacher. Born in Athens, he made his stage debut in Il barbiere di Siviglia at the Greek National Opera in 1931, and went on to sing leading basso cantante roles both in Europe (including the Teatro alla Scala) and the United States.

== Metropolitan Opera ==
Moscona made his New York debut at the Metropolitan Opera as Ramfis in Aïda on December 13, 1937, and sang there until 1961, in a total of 719 performances. Among his roles with the company were indeed Ramfis (opposite Gina Cigna, then Maria Caniglia, Regina Resnik, Herva Nelli, and Renata Tebaldi), Lodovico in Otello (with Giovanni Martinelli, then Ramón Vinay and Mario del Monaco), Sparafucile in Rigoletto (with Lawrence Tibbett, then Robert Weede, Leonard Warren, and Ettore Bastianini), Manon (opposite Bidu Sayão, then Grace Moore), Pimenn in Boris Godunov (with Ezio Pinza in the title role), Lothario in Mignon (with Risë Stevens, then Jennie Tourel), Mephisto in Faust, Alvise in La Gioconda (with Zinka Milanov), Tom (then Samuel) in Un ballo in maschera, the Old Hebrew in Samson et Dalila, Ferrando in Il trovatore, Titurel in Parsifal (with Lauritz Melchior, then Max Lorenz, as Parsifal; and Kirsten Flagstad as Kundry; conducted by Erich Leinsdorf), Sarastro in Die Zauberflöte (with Nadine Conner, then Eleanor Steber, as Pamina; later Erna Berger as the Queen of Night), Raimondo in Lucia di Lammermoor (opposite Lily Pons, then Maria Callas as Miss Lucia; and Jan Peerce as Edgardo), Nilakantha in Lakmé (with Pons), Don Basilio in Il barbiere di Siviglia, Padre Guardiano in La forza del destino, Fasolt in Das Rheingold (conducted by George Szell), the Verdi Requiem, the Commendatore in Don Giovanni (directed by Herbert Graf), Colline in La bohème (with Jarmila Novotná, then Licia Albanese, Dorothy Kirsten, and Victoria de los Ángeles; and Giuseppe di Stefano), Arkel in Pelléas et Mélisande, Oroveso in Norma (with Callas), Frère Laurent in Roméo et Juliette, King Heinrich in Lohengrin (with Helen Traubel as Elsa), Hunding in Die Walküre (with Astrid Varnay as Brünnhilde), and the Grand Inquisiteur in Don Carlos (with Richard Tucker, then Jussi Björling, in the name part).

His final appearance with the Met was in Lucia di Lammermoor (with Dame Joan Sutherland).

In 1945, the basso became a citizen of the United States. He can be seen in the 1951 film, The Great Caruso, starring Mario Lanza. He himself stars in the 1963 Greek film Ο Άσωτος (O Asotos / The Prodigal Son).

== Discography ==
Among Moscona's commercial recordings are La bohème (with Sayão and Tucker, 1947) and Il trovatore (opposite Björling, Milanov, Fedora Barbieri, and Warren, conducted by Renato Cellini, 1952). Under the baton of Arturo Toscanini, he sang Concert Versions of Fidelio (as Don Fernando, with Rose Bampton, Peerce, and Steber, 1944), La bohème (with Albanese, Peerce, Anne McKnight, and Frank Valentino, 1946), Otello (as Lodovico, with Nelli, Vinay, and Giuseppe Valdengo, 1947), and Un ballo in maschera (as Samuel, with Nelli, Peerce, and Robert Merrill, 1954), which were later issued by RCA Victor.

After his retirement, Moscona taught at the Academy of Vocal Arts in Philadelphia, the city in which he died, six days before his sixty-eighth birthday.
