= Bad Life =

(The) Bad Life may refer to:

- Bad Life (Public Image Ltd song)
- Bad Life (Sigrid and Bring Me the Horizon song)
- The Bad Life (novel), a 2005 French novel by Frédéric Mitterrand
- The Bad Life (film), a 1973 Argentine crime film
