= Floris Visser =

Dutch opera director & arts administrator (born 1983)

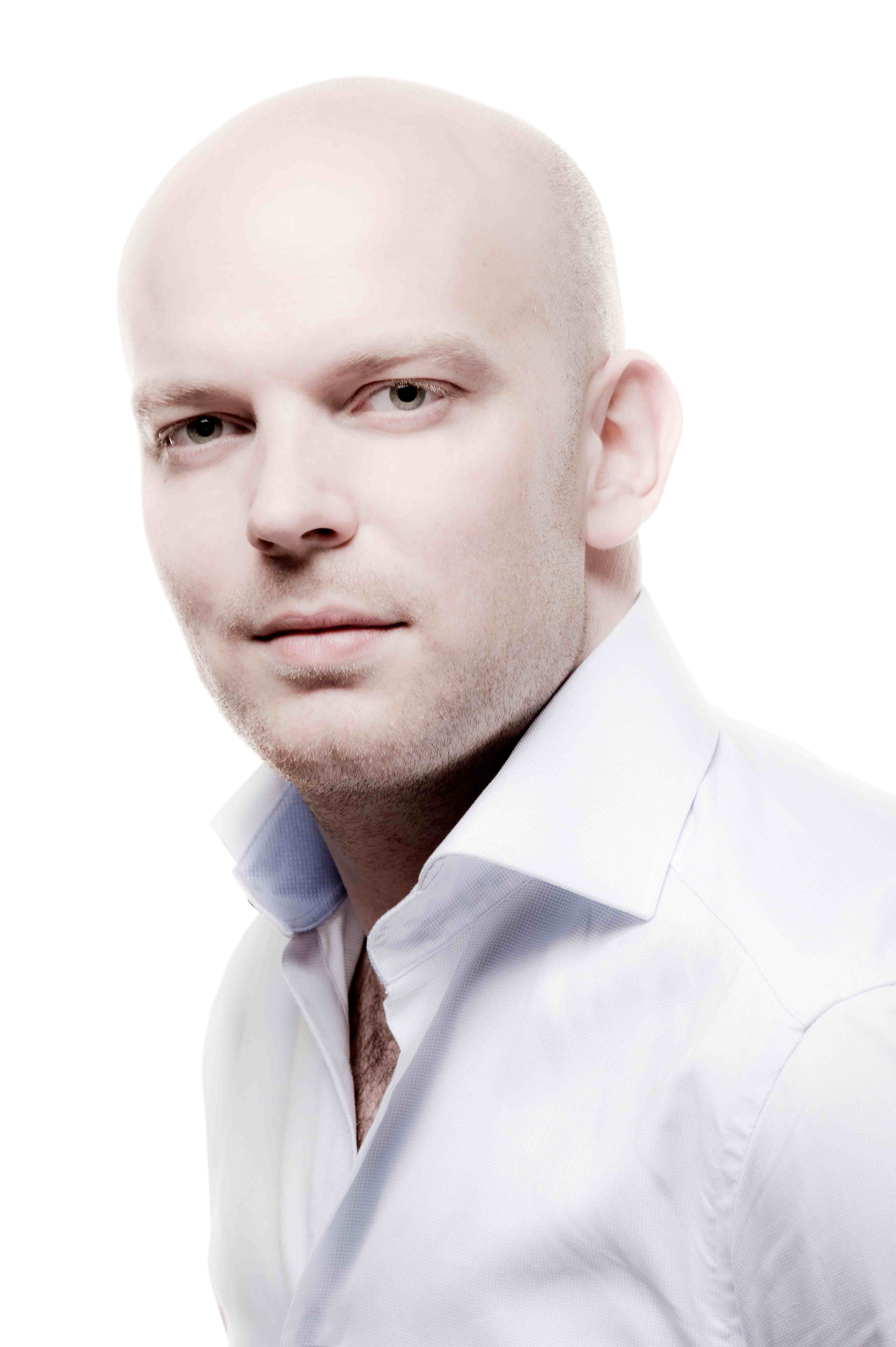
- Born: Floris Jonathan Visser; 22 April 1983 (age 43); Amsterdam, The Netherlands
- Education: Theater Academy, Maastricht & Royal Conservatory, The Hague
- Occupations: Opera director, Arts administrator, Professor of Drama
- Years active: 2006, present
- Website: www.florisvisser.com

Floris Visser (born 1983) is a Dutch opera director and arts administrator. As an internationally acclaimed and award-winning director, he is considered one of the leading talents of his generation. Visser works in renowned opera houses such as Glyndebourne Festival Opera, Zürich Opera House, the Bolshoi Theatre Moscow, the Royal Danish Opera, Dutch National Opera & the Internationale Händelfestspiele. He holds professorships at several prominent institutes for the arts.

== Early life and education ==
Born in Amsterdam, The Netherlands, Floris Visser performed on the theatre stage from a very early age. During his years at elementary and high school he was trained as an actor, singer and classical pianist. Following his studies at the Gymnasium, he attended the Theatre Academy of Maastricht, where he was educated as an actor and director. After graduating at the Maastricht Theatre Academy in 2006, he went on to study classical singing at the Royal Conservatory of The Hague. While still a student there, he was appointed Professor of drama and dramaturgy at the Royal Conservatory, and served as assistant director at Dutch National Opera Academy and for Willy Decker at Dutch National Opera.

== Early work ==
In 2008 he directed Mozart’s Le Nozze di Figaro at the Royal Theatre Carré, followed by productions of Menotti's The Telephone and Poulenc's La Voix Humaine at the InternationalTheatre Festival Amsterdam and the New Festival The Hague. In 2009, he produced Handel’s Agrippina for the International Handel Year at the Royal Theatre The Hague, and the Teatro Communale in Modena. He then created a new production of Mozart's La Clemenza di Tito at the Lucent Danstheater. In 2011 he was dramaturg and assistant director for the production of Gluck’s Orfeo ed Euridice on the lake of the Royal Palace of Soestdijk. In 2011, he also directed his own production of Rossini’s Il Signor Bruschino, which played at the Royal Concertgebouw Amsterdam and Konzerthaus Berlin, and staged Life with an idiot, after Alfred Schnittke's opera & Viktor Jerofejev’s novella, for Dutch National Opera.

== Cultural professor and artistic director ==
In 2012, Visser was appointed Cultural Professor at Delft University of Technology In 2013, he directed the Dutch premiere of Benjamin Britten's Owen Wingrave for the Dutch touring company Opera Trionfo. The same year he was appointed artistic director of Opera Trionfo. In 2013, he was awarded the Charlotte Köhler Prize 2013 by the Prince Bernhard Culture Fund. His company's mission has always been to create productions of rare and unique opera repertoire and the development of young talent. Visser also turned the company into an international platform that coproduces with orchestras, theatres, and other opera houses at home and abroad.

== Recent work ==
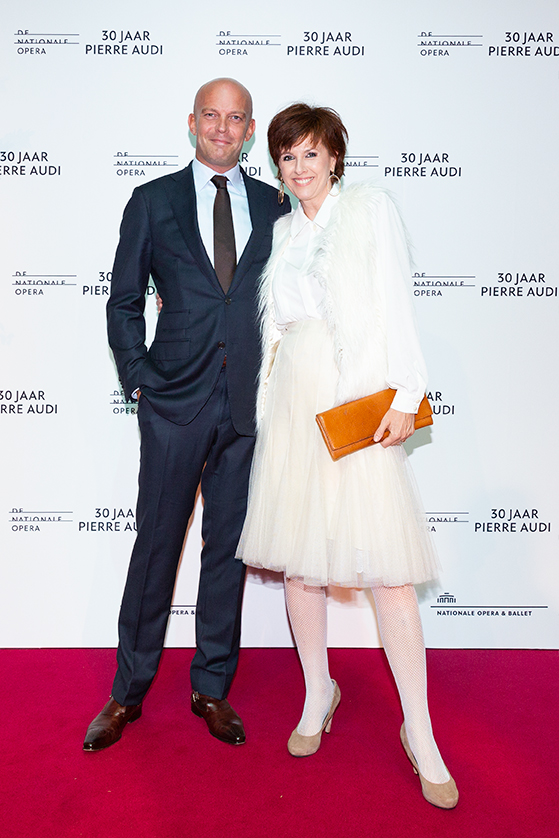
Floris Visser at DNO's Opera Gala

In 2013, Visser became the youngest and first Dutch director ever to be invited to the Bolshoi Opera in Moscow. Here he staged Mozart's Così fan tutte, which premiered in May 2014. This production received five Golden Mask nominations, Russia's most prestigious theatre prize. Amongst the nominations were those for Best Production and Best Director. His 2015 production of Gluck’s Orphée et Eurydice for Dutch National Touring Opera got awarded Opera of the Year 2015 by Opera Magazine. In 2016, he directed the world premiere of Pierangelo Valtinoni's The Wizard of Oz (Italian: Il Mago di Oz) at Opernhaus Zürich. In 2017 Visser staged Handel's oratorium Semele for the opening of The Internationale Händelfestspiele Karslruhe, which became a famous production with German and international audiences and press. The same year he initiated a four-year plan for a series of newly composed operas called Sign of the Times in co-production with Opera Trionfo, Dutch National Opera and the Asko|Schoenberg Ensemble. The first episode, Fortress Europe, was composed by Calliope Tsoupaki. and premiered during the Opera Forward Festival 2017. In 2017–2018 he directed Verdi's La Traviata for Dutch National Touring Opera & Antigona by Tommaso Traetta as a co-production of Theater Osnabrück and Opera Trionfo.

More recent productions were Vivaldi's oratorium Juditha Triumphans at Dutch National Opera (a first in the company's history), Manon by Jules Massenet at Zürich Opera House with star tenor Piotr Beczala, & Les contes d’Hoffmann at Staatstheater Karlsruhe. In the season 2019-2020 he directed Mozart's Don Giovanni for the Badisches Staatstheater, Le Nozze di Figaro at the Aalto Musiktheater in Essen, and Madama Butterfly at Oper Graz. In 2022 he returned to the Händel-Festspiele to direct a highly praised production of Hercules, lauded as “outstanding” by Die Welt and “astonishing” by Frankfurter Rundschau. Opernwelt wrote: "Floris Visser shows Handel's oratorio "Hercules" in Karlsruhe as a visually powerful psychodrama. He turns Handel's oratorio Hercules upside down and tells the story from the end. With this ingenious setting...Visser transcends the conventional.” And Opera Now awarded it 5 stars and wrote: “an exciting production by Floris Visser. In a subtle analysis of Hercules’ relationship with his wife Dejanira he depicts the agonising abyss created by jealousy.... the great success of this pioneering production.”

In the summer of 2022 he made his UK debut at Glyndebourne Festival Opera with a highly praised production of Puccini's La Bohème. The Guardian lauded it as "A riveting show" and The Times wrote: "It's rare to encounter a staging that presents the world's most popular opera in a radically different way... I was transfixed by Floris Visser's production."

Visser serves as an opera educator for Dutch National Opera Academy, the Conservatory of Amsterdam, the Royal Conservatory of The Hague, the Theatre Academy of Maastricht, and the International Opera Studio (IOS) Zürich. In 2018, he was invited to become a director at the Royal Holland Society of Sciences and Humanities'

== Honors and awards ==
- Cultural Professor at Delft University of Technology.
- Charlotte Köhler Prize by Prince Bernhard Culture Fund.
- Nominations for Golden Mask Awards (best director and best production a.o.).
- Opera of the Year by Operamagazine.
- Director at the Royal Holland Society of Sciences and Humanities.
- Honorary Member of the Metropolitan Opera Club.

== List of productions ==
- Rupert, eine Geschichte, music theatre production based on texts from Peter Shaffer's Amadeus & music by Marlène Dietrich (actor, director), 2003
- Friend of merit, based on Thomas Rosenboom's eponymous novel, solo performance (actor, director), 2003
- Blindless, theatre play based on José Saramago's eponymous novel (actor, co-director), 2004
- Sophocles: Antigone (actor), role of Creon, director: Gees Linnebank, 2004
- Guantanamo Bay - (actor, co-director), music theatre production, director:Peter Missotten, 2004
- Chalet, theatre production based on improvisations (actor, co-director), director: Yolande Bertsch, 2005
- Als Maria Magdalena, documentary film about life and meaning of Mary Magdalene, Musica Sacra Festival, 2005
- Orfeo Intermezzi, music theatre production based on works of Ovid, Ramsey Nasr, Gluck, Offenbach a.o., Onafhankelijk Toneel Rotterdam, director: Mirjam Koen, 2005
- Handel, music theatre production based on life story & music of G.F. Händel (actor, director) in coproduction with Music Poetica The Hague & Jörn Boysen, 2006
- Moeders/Zonen/Dochters, music theatre production, Onafhankelijk Toneel Rotterdam, director: Mirjam Koen, 2006
- Groupe des Six, music theatre production based on works of Francis Poulenc, Arthur Honegger, Jean Cocteau a.o. (director), Royal Conservatoire The Hague, 2007
- Margarete, music theatre production based on Goethe's Faust in coproduction with Ensemble Elektra (director), New Festival & Royal Conservatoire The Hague, 2008
- Wolfgang Amadeus Mozart: Le Nozze di Figaro, Royal Theatre Carré, 2008
- Gian Carlo Menotti: The Telephone, IT's Festival Amsterdam & Dutch National Opera Academy, 2008
- Francis Poulenc: La Voix Humaine, IT's Festival Amsterdam & New Festival The Hague, 2009
- Georges Friedrich Händel: Agrippina, Royal Theatre The Hague & Teatro Comunale Modena, 2009
- Wolfgang Amadeus Mozart: La Clemenza di Tito, Lucent Dance Theatre & Anghiari Festival, 2010
- Christoph Willibald Gluck: Orfeo ed Euridice, De Utrechtse Spelen, dramaturg & assistant director 2011
- Gioachino Rossini: Il Signor Bruschino, Koninklijk Concertgebouw Amsterdam & Konzerthaus Berlin, 2011
- Alfred Schnittke: Life with an idiot, Dutch National Opera, 2011
- Johann Sebastian Bach: Matthäus Passion, Spui Theatre The Hague, 2012
- Christoph Willibald Gluck: Orfeo ed Euridice, De Utrechtse Spelen, revival director 2012
- Georges Bizet: Carmen, Delft University of Technology, 2012
- Benjamin Britten: Owen Wingrave, Opera Trionfo, 2013
- Giacomo Puccini: La Bohème, Theater Osnabrück, 2013
- Benjamin Britten: Owen Wingrave, Opera Trionfo, 2014
- Wolfgang Amadeus Mozart: Così fan tutte, Bolshoi Theatre Moscow, 2014
- Christoph Willibald Gluck: Orphée et Eurydice, Dutch National Touring Opera, 2015
- Leoš Janáček: Jenůfa, Staatsoper Hannover, 2015
- Benjamin Britten: Owen Wingrave, Theater Osnabrück & Opera Trionfo, 2016
- Wolfgang Amadeus Mozart: Così fan tutte, Bolshoi Theatre Moscow, revival 2016
- Pierangelo Valtinoni: Der Zauberer von Oz, Zürich Opera House, 2017
- George Friedrich Händel: Semele, Internationale Händelfestspiele Karlsruhe, 2017
- Calliope Tsoupaki: Fortress Europe, 2017
- Young Patrons Gala: Dutch National Opera & Ballet, 2017
- Giuseppe Verdi: La Traviata, Dutch National Touring Opera, 2017
- Wolfgang Amadeus Mozart: Così fan tutte, Bolshoi Theatre Moscow, revival 2017
- George Friedrich Händel: Semele, Internationale Händelfestspiele Karlsruhe, revival 2018
- Tommaso Traetta: Antigona, Theater Osnabrück & Opera Trionfo, 2018
- Antonio Vivaldi: Juditha Triumphans, Dutch National Opera, 2019
- Jules Massenet: Manon, Zürich Opera House, 2019
- Jacques Offenbach: Les contes d'Hoffmann, Badisches Staatstheater Karlruhe, 2019
- Wolfgang Amadeus Mozart: Don Giovanni, Badisches Staatstheater Karlsruhe, 2019
- Wolfgang Amadeus Mozart: Le Nozze di Figaro, Aalto Musiktheater Essen, 2020
- Jules Massenet: Manon, Zürich Opera House, 2020
- George Friedrich Händel: Hercules, Internationale Händelfestspiele Karlsruhe, 2022
- Giacomo Puccini: La Bohème, Glyndebourne Festival Opera, 2022
- Giacomo Puccini: Madama Butterfly, Oper Graz, 2022
- Wolfgang Amadeus Mozart: Le Nozze di Figaro, Aalto Musiktheater Essen, 2023
- Giacomo Puccini: Madama Butterfly, the Danish Royal Opera, 2024
- Wolfgang Amadeus Mozart: Idomeneo, rè di Creta, Cologne Opera, 2024
- Kurt Weill: Die Sieben Todsüdnen, Dutch National Opera Academy, 2025
- Viktor Ullmann: Der Kaiser von Atlantis, Dutch National Opera Academy, 2025
- Jules Massenet: Manon, Zürich Opera House, 2025
- Richard Wagner: Parsifal, Semperoper Dresden, 2026
- Giacomo Puccini: La Bohème, Welsh National Opera, 2026
