= Constance Hauman =

American soprano (born 1961)

- Born: Constance Anne Hauman; January 13, 1961 (age 65); Ann Arbor, Michigan, US
- Genres: Opera, Pop, Jazz, Soft Rock, Blue-Eyed Soul, Electronic,
- Occupations: Singer-songwriter, opera/concert singer, actress, producer, arranger, music director, creative director
- Instruments: Piano, vocals
- Years active: 1984–present
- Labels: Isotopia, Capitol, Sony, Teldec, Chandos, Kairos
- Website: constancehauman.com

Constance Hauman (born 1961) is a soprano. She attended Northwestern University. Constance Hauman performed the title role in the live recording of Alban Berg's Lulu (Chandos) made in Copenhagen in 1996 at the Queen of Denmark's Castle. Shifting from her longstanding classical career, Constance Hauman's first full-length release of original songs, Falling into Now, was chosen by the Guardian UK Music Critic Caroline Sullivan as one of the top 10 best pop albums of 2015, coming in at No. 8 between Mark Ronson and Florence and The Machine.

== Overview ==
Constance Hauman has over 2500 international performances to her credit, portraying over 70 diverse roles in opera, music theater and symphonic works.

December 2019 she made her Vienna Statsoper (Vienna Opera) debut in the role of Queen Elizabeth, Purity and Friend of Orlando's son in Olga Neuwirth's world premiere of Virginia Wolff's Orlando. She was featured as Artist of the week in Opera Wire for these roles and her unusual career which spans Opera, rock, pop, jazz and funk.

In 2003–2004, Hauman sang the World Premiere of Alice/Renee in Olga Neuwirth and Elfriede Jelinek's stage adaptation of David Lynch's film Lost Highway. This production was a special event to honor the city of Graz, Austria as the Cultural City of Europe 2003. Performances continued in Basel Switzerland and the recording on Kairos was a recipient of France's esteemed Diaspon d'Or music award in Paris.

Leonard Bernstein handpicked Hauman to fill in on 24 hrs. notice to replace an ailing June Anderson in the only concerts where he conducted his operetta Candide himself. This performance catapulted her to over 150 performances of Cunégonde in Candide over a 6-year period.

She has performed and recorded with symphony orchestras and opera companies including the Berlin Philharmonic, Chicago Lyric Opera; Chicago Symphony; San Francisco Symphony; London Symphony; New York City Opera, Los Angeles Opera, Long Beach Opera, Pittsburgh Opera, Dallas Opera, Washington National Opera, Michigan Opera Theater, Miami Opera, Toledo Opera, Spoleto Festival Charleston S.C.; Canadian Opera; English National Opera, Welsh National Opera, London Sinfonietta; Opéra de Nice, Opéra de Marseille, Opéra de Tours, Opéra de Nantes, Opéra de St-Étienne, Opéra du Rhin, Opéra de Montpellier, Théâtre des Champs-Élysées, Opéra Comique, Opéra National de Paris; Opera de Roma, Teatro Communale Florence; Spoleto Festival; Spanga Festival Holland; Japan Philharmonic; Royal Danish Radio Orchestra; Hong Kong Festival; Orquesta di Lisboa, Portugal; VARA Radio Orchestra, Amsterdam.

Hauman made her theatrical debut as Florence Foster Jenkins in Souvenir, A Fantasia on Florence Foster Jenkins at The Falcon Theatre in Burbank CA, February 2009 to critical acclaim. She was nominated as best performance in a duo comedy by LA Theatre Awards.

Hauman is a Richard Tucker Award recipient, and a 2008 recipient of an Alumni Merit Award from Northwestern University.

== Exiles in Paradise ==
Constance Hauman is the creator, writer, producer, performer of Exiles in Paradise, a documentary film/live performance recital with string quartet which spans the history, lives and Hollywood stories of Eastern Europe's exiled composers in Los Angeles from 1932 to 1949. Exiles opened up the Jewish Museum in Berlin on September 10, 2001; it has been performed at the 92nd St.Y. NYC; Austrian Embassy, Washington D.C.; and in 2006 for a run of performances at the Falcon Theater (Garry Marshall) in Burbank, CA. Most recently, Exiles in Paradise was performed in Pinehurst, North Carolina, featuring soloists from the Carolina Philharmonic.

== Recordings ==
Constance Hauman can be heard on the following record labels: American Classics (Milken Archives), Capitol (Empire of the Sun/LUX), Chandos (Lulu), Kairos (Lost Highway), Teldec (Parsifal), Sony (Madame Butterfly) and Isotopia Records (Falling Into Now, High Tides, Rare Christmas, The Quarantine Trilogy, waves 1, 2 & 3, Tropical Thunderstorm; Bad Get Some and Feed the Wolf)

Shifting from her classical roots, Falling into Now is Constance Hauman's first full-length release on her label Isotopia Records. It is also the first album by Ms. Hauman as a singer-songwriter, pianist, arranger and producer. Featuring 14 original songs from her catalogue of over 200 songs and arrangements, Falling into Now fuses the genres of pop, jazz, orchestral and alternative blue-eyed soul. Ms. Hauman is joined by renowned drummer/percussionist Ross Pederson who also partners with Ms. Hauman as co-arranger/producer and as co-composer for the title track. Falling into Now was released on October 30, 2015, in the United States and on December 2, 2015, in UK/Europe and Asia. In July 2015, Isotopia Records became an imprint of the Irish label Heresy Records and has worldwide digital and physical distribution with Naxos. A deluxe version of Falling Into Now was released on Spotify October 8, 2018, to coincide with the success of the album's launch to non-commercial radio.

Constance's second vocal solo album of original works titled High Tides, again with Ross Pederson, was released on Isotopia/Heresy Records January 25, 2019, to critical acclaim in both the US and Germany "Extraordinary craftsmanship as a songwriter...undeniable talent...Astounding...Inspired Music that floods the listeners’ consciousness”—Musikreviews.de

Her third album The Quarantine Trilogy, (1st and 2nd waves) released May 29 and August 28, 2020, marked Hauman's foray as a solo pianist and her first recording of purely instrumental music. The album features Hauman on keyboards with Pederson and his wife bassist Julia Adamy. The album of pre lockdown improvisations between Hauman and Pederson, completed in social distanced home studios was inspired by her personal experience of COVID-19 and recent traumatic political events.

Hauman/Pederson followed up the series with The Quarantine Trilogy, the 3rd wave October 30, 2020.

January 2021 Isotopia released Hauman/Pederson single Taking Some Steps Ahead which went to #1 on New Age Radio. The full-length album Tropical Thunderstorm was released in March 2021 and featured in May on NPR's 'Play It Forward' when the legendary George Clinton 'played it forward' to Constance Hauman's multi-genre talents. Hauman then was featured on NPR July 7, 2021 and the program was repeated November 26, 2021.

2021 closed out with her single Rare Christmas breaking #22 on top 40 Adult Contemporary Radio Charts and #28 on The Hot 100 for ACR.

2022 has seen The title track to Tropical Thunderstorm chart to #1 on Music Weekly's Indie Singles top 40 chart in July 2022 as well as hit #24 on the ACR Hot 100.

2023 Her Single 'Good To Be Back Together Again' produced with Pederson, charted on Satellite FM Paris And Big Ear Radio UK

January 2024 she released her dance EP 'Queen of the Night' taking original tracks produced by Jimmy Harry (RuPaul's Supermodel) and Hauman in the 1990's: Mozart's Queen of Night Arias, Carl Orff's Carmina Burana's Stetit Puella remixed by Ross Pederson and a new track L'Amour written by Hauman produced by Pederson using the lyrics from Carmen's famous Habanera aria.

2025 Hauman became a Grammy-nominated Producer for George Clinton's Audible book '..And your Ass will Follow'

Constance is executive producer for first live full-length in-concert Parliament Funkadelic album in 40+ years which will be released March 2026 a belated commemoration of 50 years of Parliament Funkadelic and Maggot Brain taken from their live concert at the Roundhouse in London in 2018.

== Producer/Music Director ==
Besides producing her own solo album projects, Constance is the music director, keyboardist, producer and co-arranger and co-songwriter for the indie soul, rock, funk band Miss Velvet and The Blue Wolf, producing their debut album, BAD GET SOME, at the iconic United Sound Systems Studio in Detroit, Michigan. BAD GET SOME was released on Isotopia Records October 27, 2017, with a debut performance opening for George Clinton and Parliament Funkadelic on Halloween 2017 at BB King's NYC. After this performance George Clinton invited Miss Velvet and The Blue Wolf to join him on his final tour in 2018, opening for him in 60 US and European/UK cities. Miss Velvet and The Blue Wolf continued to tour with the legendary icon to Hawaii, Japan and Australia in April 2019. Their second album FEED THE WOLF, also produced by Ms Hauman features George Clinton on the track and music video PHAT BLUNT. George Clinton was a recipient of the 2019 Grammy Lifetime achievement Award.

Despite 3 singles breaking 20 on Billboard's Mainstream Rock Indicator Chart in the spring and fall of 2020, the band broke up when Miss Velvet abruptly quit in June 2021. The band re-formed and has performed as the Blue Wolf Experience, The Blue Wolf Extinction and currently The Blu Eye Extinction.

The Blu Eye Extinction joined a 10 city UK tour with George Clinton and Parliament Funkadelic in May 2022 and a 29 city US tour on his One Nation Under A Groove tour.

Blu Eye Extinction released a 10 track album produced by Hauman and bassist James Jones. The cover art for the exclusive vinyl packaging by upcoming L.A. artist KG Marquel received critical acclaim as did the album as 'the new band to watch' (George Clinton Relix Magazine) The band continued to open for Parliament Funkadelic and Fishbone throughout 2023.

== Films ==
Constance can be seen as Kate Pinkerton in Frédéric Mitterrand's critically acclaimed film Madame Butterfly (1995).

Initially commissioned for the Danish production of Alban Berg’s Lulu, Lewis Klahr's cut-out animation refigures the opera's themes in a torrent of images featuring Ms. Hauman as Lulu. With an ever-inventive approach to color and symbol, Klahr distills the title character's moral predicament, along with a great many of German Expressionism's characteristic motifs, in the span of a pop song. The film received many awards and accolades from several international film festivals after its debut in 1996.
