= Lina Pizzolongo =

Canadian vocal coach and concert pianist

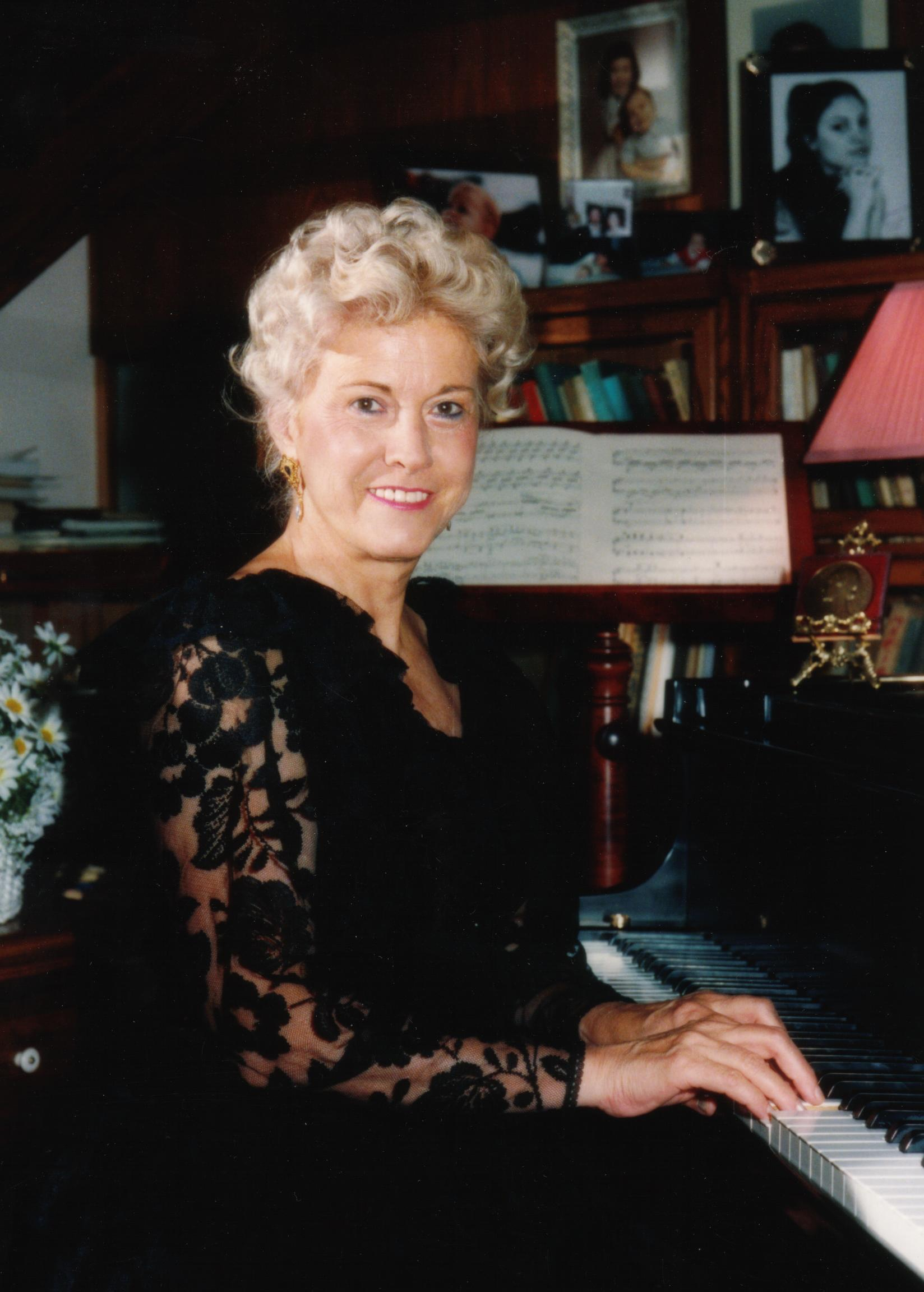

Background information
- Born: January 25, 1925; Montreal, Canada
- Died: September 21, 1991 (aged 66) Toronto, Canada
- Occupations: Musician, vocal coach
- Instrument: Piano
- Spouse: Louis Quilico

Lina Pizzolongo (January 25, 1925, Montreal - September 21, 1991, Toronto) was a Canadian vocal coach and concert pianist. She was married to baritone Louis Quilico and was the mother of two children Donna and Gino Quilico, also a baritone.

== Career ==
She studied first at the Conservatoire de musique du Québec à Montréal, with Yvonne Hubert, then at the "École normale de musique" in Paris, with Alfred Cortot and Marguerite Long, and at the Accademia Nazionale di Santa Cecilia in Rome with Carlo Zecchi. She performed as a soloist with the Montreal Symphony Orchestra and the CBC Radio Orchestra. She taught as an instructor first at the Montréal Conservatory, and later at the University of Toronto from 1970 to 1987, and the McGill University from 1987 to 1990. As a vocal coach and accompanist, she was the primary influence in the careers of her husband Louis and son Gino.
