= Daniel Toscan du Plantier =

French film producer (1941–2003)

- Born: 7 April 1941; Chambéry, France
- Died: 11 February 2003 (aged 61); Berlin, Germany
- Resting place: Père Lachaise
- Education: Institut d'Etudes Politiques
- Occupation: Film producer
- Spouses: Marie-Christine Barrault (m. 1965; div. 1978) Francesca Comencini (m. 1982; div. 1987) Sophie Bouniol (m. 1991; died 1996) Melita Nikolic (m. 1998)
- Partner: Isabelle Huppert (former)
- Children: 5

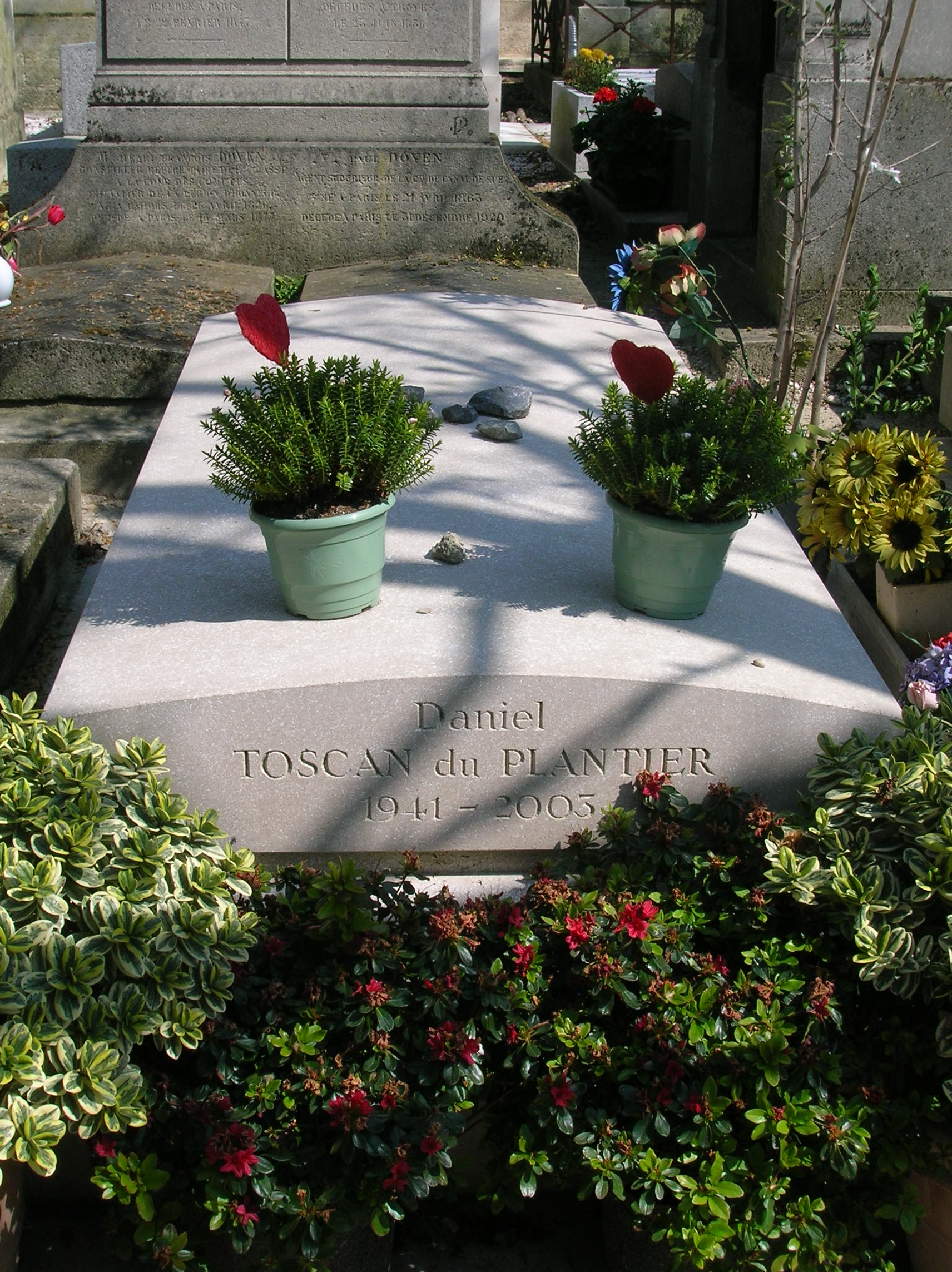
Toscan du Plantier's grave in Père Lachaise.

Daniel Toscan du Plantier (7 April 1941 – 11 February 2003) was a French film producer. Educated at the Institut d'Etudes Politiques he became advertising manager for the France Soir daily newspaper in 1966 and between 1975 and 1985 was director-general of Gaumont, and president of Unifrance, an organisation for promoting French films, from 1988 until his death.

== Personal life ==
Toscan du Plantier was married four times and had three sons and two daughters. His first marriage was to French actress Marie-Christine Barrault, with whom he had one son and one daughter. He then lived with actress Isabelle Huppert. His second marriage was with Italian film director and producer Francesca Comencini, with whom he had one son. His third wife was Sophie Toscan du Plantier, who was murdered in 1996 (the crime is considered unsolved in Ireland, where it happened, and solved in France, where Ian Bailey was convicted in May 2019). His fourth marriage was with Melita Nikolic in 1998, with whom he had one son and one daughter. Toscan du Plantier died of a heart attack in Berlin, Germany, where he was attending the 2003 Berlin Film Festival.

== Filmography ==
=== As producer ===
Year	Title	Notes
1975	Cousin Cousine	
1977	The Lacemaker	
1977	The Devil Probably	
1977	Kung-fu wu-su	
1979	Nosferatu the Vampyre	Uncredited
1980	City of Women	
1981	Six personnages en quête d'un chanteur	Television film
1982	Fanny and Alexander	Uncredited
1983	L'Argent	
1983	Nostalghia	
1983	À Nos Amours	
1984	Carmen	Executive producer; uncredited
1985	Police	Executive producer; uncredited
1987	Under the Sun of Satan	
1987	Travelling avant	
1988	La Bohème	
1988	La lumière du lac	Executive producer
1988	Yehudi Menuhin Retour aux Sources	
1988	The French as Seen by...	Miniseries; 2 episodes
1989	The Cook, the Thief, His Wife & Her Lover	Co-producer
1989	Boris Godunov	
1990	Korczak	
1990	Branches of the Tree	
1990	La voix humaine	Executive producer
1991	Agantuk	Executive producer
1992	In the Country of Juliets	
1993	L'écrivain public	
1993	The Flood	
1994	Dead Tired	
1994	Seven Sundays	
1995	Madame Butterfly	
1996	Désiré	
1996	Bambola	
1997	Quadrille	
1997	Le bassin de J.W.	
1997	The Chambermaid on the Titanic	
1997	Les Précieuses ridicules	Executive producer; television film
1997	The Comedian	
1998	Tartuffe, or The Impostor	Executive producer; television film
1998	Les fourberies de Scapin	Television film
1999	The Dilettante	
1999	Civilisées	
1999	L'impromptu de Versailles	Television film
1999	Le mariage forcé	Television film
2000	Les Savates du bon Dieu	
2000	Bellyful	
2000	L'avare	Television film
2000	L'affaire Marcorelle	
2000	L'Homme qui parlait aux lions	
2001	Day Off	Line producer
2001	Karmen Geï	Line producer
2001	Tosca	
2001	Léaud l'unique	Television special
2001	Le bourgeois gentilhomme	Television film
2002	Le malade imaginaire	Television film
2003	En territoire indien	
2003	Above the Clouds	
2003	Les femmes savantes	Executive producer; television film
