= Madame Butterfly (1995 film) =

1995 film directed by Frédéric Mitterrand

- Film poster
- Directed by: Frédéric Mitterrand
- Written by: Frédéric Mitterrand; Libretto: Luigi Illica; Giuseppe Giacosa
- Based on: Madama Butterfly (1904 opera) by Giacomo Puccini; Luigi Illica; Giuseppe Giacosa
- Produced by: Daniel Toscan du Plantier; Pierre-Olivier Bardet
- Starring: Huang Ying; Richard Troxell; Ning Liang; Richard Cowan; Fan Jingma; Constance Hauman
- Cinematography: Philippe Welt
- Edited by: Luc Barnier
- Music by: Giacomo Puccini; James Conlon (adaptation)
- Production companies: Erato Films; Idéale Audience; France 3 Cinéma; Sony Classical; Canal+ BBC; ZDF; S4C; France Télécom; CNC
- Distributed by: Les Films du Losange (France); Blue Dolphin Films (UK); Sony Pictures Classics (through Columbia TriStar Film Distributors International) (Germany and Austria)
- Release dates: 22 November 1995 (France); 20 June 1997 (UK)
- Running time: 105 minutes
- Countries: France; United Kingdom; Germany
- Language: Italian

Madame Butterfly is a 1995 musical film, based on the 1904 opera Madama Butterfly with music by Giacomo Puccini and libretto by Luigi Illica and Giuseppe Giacosa. It is written and directed by Frédéric Mitterrand, and produced by Daniel Toscan du Plantier and Pierre-Olivier Bardet. The cast features soprano Huang Ying as Cio-Cio-san, tenor Richard Troxell as Pinkerton, mezzo-soprano Ning Liang as Suzuki, and bass-baritone Richard Cowan as Sharpless. The score was adapted, arranged, and conducted by James Conlon.

The film was an international co-production between French, British, and German companies. It was released by Les Films du Losange in France on 22 November 1995, and received positive reviews. At the 21st César Awards, the film won Best Costume Design and was nominated for Best Production Design.

== Cast ==
Role	Voice type	Actor	Singing voice (if applicable)
Cio-Cio-san	soprano	Huang Ying	—N/a
Lt. Benjamin F. Pinkerton	tenor	Richard Troxell	—N/a
Suzuki	mezzo-soprano	Ning Liang	—N/a
Sharpless	baritone	Richard Cowan	—N/a
Goro	tenor	Fan Jingma	—N/a
Prince Yamadori	tenor	Christopheren Nòmura	—N/a
Kate Pinkerton	mezzo-soprano	Constance Hauman	—N/a
Uncle Bonze	bass	Yo Kusakabe	Edmund-Zelotes Tolliver
Uncle Yakuside	bass	Kamel Touati	Richard Tronc
Cio-Cio's father	silent	Yoshi Oida	—N/a
Cio-Cio's mother	mezzo-soprano	Thérèse Nguyen Ba Hau	Laurence Monteyrol
Dolore, Cio-Cio's child	silent	Miki-Lou Pinard	—N/a
The Imperial Commissioner	bass	Qing Wu	Edmund-Zelotes Tolliver
The Official Registrar	bass	Nabil Agoun	—N/a
The Aunt	soprano	Midori Mornet	Asaya Otsuka
The Cousin	soprano	Wen-Juan Zhao	Catherine Napoli

== Production ==
As filming in Japan proved prohibitively expensive, the film was shot in Tunisia, on Lake Ichkeul and in Bizerte.

== Reception ==
=== Critical response ===
Roger Ebert of the Chicago Sun-Times gave the film a positive review, writing "This beautiful new film version of “Madame Butterfly” is not a revisionist approach; it films Puccini’s opera more or less as it was intended to be seen, and of course that is what we want . The approach is traditional, the pace is attentive, and yet the emotion is still all there."

Andy Seiler of USA Today wrote "Besides a visual combination of authentic Japanese realism and picturesque, dream-like cinematography that matches the lushness of Puccini's music, director Frederic Mitterrand gives the opera a distinctively cinematic gravity and subtlety."

In contrast, Christian Leblé of Libération gave the film a negative review, writing "[The film] does not have to justify any point of view, nor any aesthetic. (...) All this to say that one comes away stunned, tired by the melodrama and by so many decibels, not particularly happy."

On the review aggregator Rotten Tomatoes, the film holds an approval rating of 70% based on reviews from 10 critics.

=== Awards and nominations ===
Ceremony	Category	Nominee	Result	Ref.
21st César Awards	Best Production Design	Michèle Abbé-Vannier	Nominated	
21st César Awards	Best Costume Design	Christian Gasc	Won	
