= Bohemian =

Bohemian or Bohemians may refer to:

- Anything of or relating to Bohemia

== Culture and arts ==
- Bohemianism, an unconventional lifestyle, originally practised by 19th–20th century European and American artists and writers.
- Bohemian style, a fashion movement
- La bohème, an opera by Giacomo Puccini
- Bohemian (band), South Korean pop group
- Bohemian glass or crystal
- Edie Brickell & New Bohemians, an alternative rock band formed in the 1980s

== Peoples ==
- Bohemians, anyone from or residing in Bohemia
- Bohemian Roma, a subgroup of the Romani people
  - Bohemian Romani, a dialect of Romani
- Bohemians (tribe), an early Slavic tribe in Bohemia
- Bohemian language
- Bohemian diaspora
- German Bohemians, ethnically German inhabitants of Bohemia
- Bohemian Jews, Jewish inhabitants of Bohemia

== Sports ==
- Bohemian F.C., an Irish club founded in 1890
- Bohemians 1905, a Czech club founded in 1905
- Bohemian Sporting Club, a former club from the Philippines
- FK Bohemians Prague (Střížkov), a Czech club founded in 1996
- UL Bohemians R.F.C., an Irish rugby union club
- Vålerenga Fotball, a Norwegian club nicknamed The Bohemians

== Other ==
- Bohemian Club, a private club with locations in San Francisco and Sonoma Country, California
- Bohemian Massif, a mountainous region of central Czech Republic, eastern Germany, southern Poland and northern Austria
- Bohemian, a brand of beer brewed by Molson Coors
- Bohemian, a British ship that sank off the U.S. state of Maine in 1864
- The Bohemian (Bouguereau), a painting by William-Adolphe Bouguereau completed in 1890
- The Bohemian (Renoir), a painting by Pierre-Auguste Renoir completed in 1868

== See also ==
- Boehmians, in mathematics
- Bohemian Club (disambiguation)
