= The Peony Pavilion (opera) =

The Peony Pavilion is a 1998 production by Peter Sellars, in a mix of Chinese and English translation, of the Ming Dynasty play The Peony Pavilion.

Part One is an avant-garde staging of the traditional Kunqu form of Chinese opera's staging of the play, which is how the play is usually performed in China. Part Two is a specially-composed two-hour opera by Tan Dun, mixing Chinese and western forms and instruments.

== Recordings ==
Sony Classics released a 1998 CD, Bitter Love: A Song Cycle sung in English by Ying Huang and the New York Virtuoso Singers based on portions of the score for Part Two.
