= Richard Troxell =

American operatic tenor

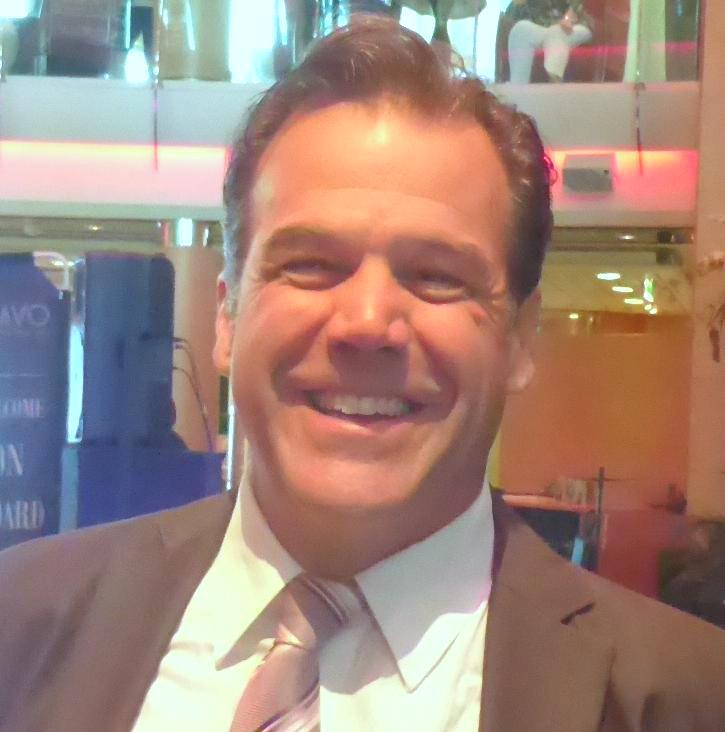
- Troxell in 2016
- Born: Thurmont, Maryland, U.S.
- Occupation: Operatic tenor
- Spouse: Lisa Lovelace
- Children: 2 sons

Richard Troxell is an American operatic tenor who has sung leading roles in the opera houses of North America, Europe, and Asia since his professional debut in 1993. His signature roles include Lt. Pinkerton, which he sang in Frédéric Mitterrand's 1995 film Madame Butterfly presented by Martin Scorsese, and Don José in Carmen which he has sung at the Sydney Opera House, the Teatro Petruzzelli in Italy, and the National Centre for the Performing Arts in Beijing.

== Life and career ==
Troxell was born and raised in Thurmont, Maryland. He graduated from the Academy of Vocal Arts in Philadelphia in 1992 and made his professional debut in 1993 as Alfredo in La traviata with Opera Cleveland. His earliest roles included Tybalt in Roméo et Juliette (Théâtre du Capitole, Toulouse and Opéra-Comique, Paris), Tamino in The Magic Flute (Virginia Opera), and the title role in Faust (Boston Lyric Opera).

In 1995, Troxell appeared as Lt. Pinkerton in Frédéric Mitterrand's 1995 film Madame Butterfly, a role he had never sung before and had to learn for the audition. He went on to sing Pinkerton many times, including performances with Washington Opera, Opera Australia, Calgary Opera, National Theater (Taiwan), Opéra de Montréal, Los Angeles Opera, Arizona Opera, and Portland Opera. His filmography also includes Cyrano de Bergerac (as Christian with Roberto Alagna in the title role), filmed at the Opéra national de Montpellier in 2003 and released on DVD by Deutsche Grammophon; and La rondine (as Prunier with Ainhoa Arteta in the title role), filmed at Washington Opera in 1998, broadcast on PBS and later released on DVD by Decca.

In the 2005/2006 season Troxell added the role of Don José in Carmen to his repertoire and has subsequently sung it with Portland Opera and at the Sydney Opera House, the Teatro Petruzzelli in Italy, and the National Centre for the Performing Arts in Beijing, Vancouver Opera, and most recently at the "House of Strombo" George Stroumboulopoulos in Toronto. His other roles in the mainstream tenor repertoire have included Rodolfo in La bohème, the title role in The Tales of Hoffmann, the Duke in Rigoletto, and Lensky in Eugene Onegin. He has also appeared in leading tenor roles in relative rarities such as Gounod's La colombe with Opéra Français de New York (1997), Offenbach's La Périchole with the Opera Philadelphia (2002), Gluck's L'île de Merlin in its US premiere at the Spoleto Festival USA (2007), Hérold's Zampa at the Opéra-Comique (2008), and Philip Glass's Galileo Galilei with Portland Opera (2012). He has sung in the world premieres of two late-20th century operas with Opera Theatre of Saint Louis: in 1995 he created the role of Joel Edmund in the world premiere of Stephen Paulus's The Woman at Otowi Crossing, and in 2000 he created the role of To-no-Chujo in the world premiere of Minoru Miki's The Tale of Genji.

Troxell made his Carnegie Hall debut in 2003 in Bach's Magnificat. The role of Borsa in Verdi's Rigoletto in 2015 was his debut at the Metropolitan Opera in New York. He sang the role of Pablo Neruda in Il Postino for Opera Saratoga in 2016.

Among Troxell's performances on the concert stage as tenor soloist are Weill's The Seven Deadly Sins (Philadelphia Orchestra, 2004), Carmina Burana (San Francisco Symphony, 2005), and Handel's Messiah (Pittsburgh Symphony Orchestra, 2009). He has also been a frequent performer at the Ocean City Pops concerts.

== Personal life ==
Troxell is married to the dancer and choreographer, Lisa Lovelace. The couple have two sons, Shane and Wilder, and reside in the countryside of Chester County, Pennsylvania.

== Recordings ==
=== Opera ===
- Puccini: Madama Butterfly – (as Pinkerton) Orchestre de Paris, James Conlon (conductor), 1995. Label: Sony Classical DVD and CD
- Alfano: Cyrano de Bergerac – (as Christian) Opéra Orchestre national Montpellier, Marco Guidarini (conductor), recorded 2003, released 2005. Label: Deutsche Grammophon DVD and CD
- Puccini: La rondine – (as Prunier) Washington National Opera Orchestra, Emmanuel Villaume (conductor), recorded 1998, released 2009. Label: Decca DVD and CD
- Glass Galileo Galilei – (as Galileo) Portland Opera, Anne Manson (conductor), November 2013. Label: Orange Mountain Music, 2 CDs

=== Concert and song ===
- Classic Broadway, Richard Troxell and the Czech National Symphony Orchestra with Steven Mercurio 2015. Label: Blue Sky Unlimited
- So in Love, Richard Troxell with Tom Lawton (piano), John Conahan (piano), Harold Evans (piano), Lee Smith (bass), Dan Monaghan (drums), 2014. Label: Blue Sky Unlimited
- What a Wonderful World, Richard Troxell with the Ocean City Pops, 1997. Label: Ocean City Pops
- Marvin David Levy: Masada – Rundfunk-Sinfonieorchester Berlin, 2004. Series: Milken Archive of Jewish Music. Label: Naxos CD
- David Amram: Symphony Songs of the Soul / Shir L'Erev Shabbat/ The Final Ingredient – Rundfunk-Sinfonieorchester Berlin; Michigan University Symphony Orchestra, 2004. Series: Milken Archive of Jewish Music. Label: Naxos CD
- David Diamond: Ahava / Music for Prayer – Seattle Symphony, 2004. Series: Milken Archive of Jewish Music. Label: Naxos CD
- Seven Heavenly Halls, Richard Troxell solo tenor, chorus and symphony orchestra, Czech National Symphony Orchestra, conductor Steven Mercurio
