= Franz Lukasovsky =

Austrian opera singer

Franz Lukasovsky (born 8 November 1940) is an Austrian operatic tenor and music educator.

== Life and career ==
Lukasovsky was born in Vienna. From the age of 6, Lukasovsky, who was a member of the Vienna Boys' Choir from 1948 to 1954, began his musical education. In 1958 he graduated from the gymnasium in Vienna, and began studies at the University of Music and Performing Arts Vienna and at the University of Vienna in the fields of German studies, history and musicology.

In 1962 he passed the teacher's examination for music teaching at grammar schools. Two years later, he passed the state examination with teaching qualification for solo singing and in 1967 he received the diploma for "solo singing" and graduated with distinction in "song and oratorio". In the same year he accepted a teaching position for voice projection at the University of Music and Performing Arts Graz and since then has participated in concerts of old, classical, romantic and contemporary music.

His opera debuts in Siena and Vienna followed in 1973 before a concert tour with Bach's Passions took him to Tokyo and Osaka. He made his opera debut in Germany in the 1974/75 season when he accepted a year's engagement at the Musiktheater im Revier in Gelsenkirchen. Since then he has fulfilled guest contracts for stage and concert in Germany, Italy, Switzerland and Austria.

In 1976 he was appointed head of a class for solo singing at the Hochschule für Musik und darstellende Kunst in Graz and in 1980 he was appointed extraordinary university professor.

He was appointed full professor at the University of Music and Performing Arts Vienna in 1984 and from 1986 to 1991 was deputy head of department and chairman of the study commission of the department for solo singing and since 1994 again deputy head of department. In 1998 he was appointed head of department before being appointed head of the institute and member of the senate of the University of Music and Performing Arts Vienna in 2002.

In 2006 Lukasovsky together with the pianist István Bonyhádi was invited to Bangkok to create a song recital on the occasion of the upcoming sixtieth anniversary of the government of King Bhumibol.

Lukasovsky leads guest and master classes in China, Finland, Italy, Japan, Korea, the Netherlands, Thailand, the Czech Republic, Vietnam and Austria and is a founding member of the Federation of Austrian Singing Pedagogues 2000 (today: EVTA-Austria), whose first president he was from 2000 to 2008.

== Prizes ==
- 1973: First Prize of the Teatro alla scala di Milano at the International Contemporary Music Competition of the Società Italiana Musica Contempororanea.
- 1973: Interpretation Prize of the Società Italiana Musica Contemporanea for the best interpretation of a contemporary vocal work.

== Awards ==
- 2009: Gold Medal of Merit of the University of Music and Performing Arts Vienna
- 2010: Great Silver Decoration of Honour for Services to the Republic of Austria
- Honorary membership of the European Voice Teachers Association
