= Calliope Tsoupaki =

Greek pianist and composer

Calliope Tsoupaki (Greek: Καλλιόπη Τσουπάκη; born 27 May 1963) is a Greek pianist and composer.

== Biography ==
Calliope Tsoupaki was born in Piraeus, Greece. She studied piano and music theory at the Hellinicon Conservatory in Athens and composition with Yannis Ioannidis. She continued her studies with Louis Andriessen at the Royal Conservatory in The Hague, and graduated in 1992.

After ending her studies, Tsoupaki settled in Amsterdam and began a career as a pianist and composer. Her works have been performed in Europe and in the United States and at international music festivals. In 1993 she lived and worked in Budapest on a three-month residency from the Pepinières Foundation for young artists. In 2007 she took a position teaching composition at Koninklijk Conservatorium. Since 2018 Calliope Tsoupaki is the composer laureate of the Netherlands.

== Works ==
Selected works include:

- Enigma for viola solo (1999)
- Medea (Μήδεια) for viola and 3 female voices (1996); words by Euripides
- When I Was 27 (Στα 27 μου χρόνια) for viola and double bass (1990)
- Music for Saxophones
- Greek Love Songs
- Vita Nova chamber opera for solo voice, baroque violin, viola da gamba and harpsichord
- Sappho's Tears for female voice, tenor recorder and violin
- Ananda for piano solo (written for the Indonesian pianist / composer Ananda Sukarlan)

Tsoupaki's works have been recorded and issued on CD including:

- Syrinx Saxophone Quartet
- Calliope Tsoupaki: St. Luke's Passion, Etcetera Records (2010)
- Vintage Brisk (2007)
- Thin Air (2020)
- Black Moon (2012) Trytone, 2022
