= Paolo Gavanelli =

Italian operatic baritone (born 1959)

Paolo Gavanelli (born 1959) is an Italian operatic baritone, born in Monselice in the Province of Padua. He studied law before turning to singing. He made his debut as Leporello in Don Giovanni in 1985 at the Teatro Donizetti in Bergamo. He is particularly known in the latter part of his career for his interpretations of Verdian baritone roles, and he has sung in the major opera houses of Europe and North America, including La Scala, the Paris Opera House, Covent Garden in London and the Metropolitan Opera in New York.

== Awards ==
2008 Grammy Awards Nomination in the category "Best Opera Recording" for La traviata
