= Vitalij Kowaljow =

Vitalij Kowaljow is a bass opera singer living in Switzerland. He initially studied piano as a child, but inspired by his parents, who sang in the choir of his Baptist church in Cherkasy, Ukraine, he took advantage of an offer to study choral conducting for the church. While studying at the Moscow Theological Institute, it was suggested that he take up singing. Working as a fireman at the time, a back injury caused him to cease that job, and he spent more time working with the choir. During a concert where the bass soloists were ill, Kowaljow stepped in, and a Swiss woman present at the concert was impressed by his voice, and arranged for him to audition for the Bern Opera in Switzerland. He went on to study at the Bern Conservatory of Music with Elisabeth Glauser, and obtained a Master's degree.

== Career ==
In 1999, Kowaljov entered the Operalia competition, founded by Plácido Domingo, and won the CultureArte Prize. In 2003, Kowaljow stepped in to replace another singer as Procida in Verdi's I vespri siciliani at the Opéra National de Paris with James Conlon conducting, which led to his recognition and a long working relationship with Conlon. In 2010, he sang Wotan in Richard Wagner's Ring cycle at the Los Angeles Opera, conducted by James Conlon, and the following year he sang in Wagner's Die Walküre at La Scala in Milan under Daniel Barenboim.

Kowaljov has more than forty roles in his repertoire, and has notably performed as Padre Guardino in Verdi's La forza del destino at the Grand Théâtre de Genève, Banquo in Verdi's Macbeth with the Dutch National Opera, and Don Alfonso in Donizetti's Lucrezia Borgia with the San Francisco Opera. As a concert artist, he has performed at the Chorégies d'Orange Festival, and has performed with the Orchestra dell'Accademia Nazionale di Santa Cecilia, the Deutsches Symphonie-Orchester Berlin, the San Francisco Symphony, and the Chicago Symphony Orchestra.

== Recordings ==
Kowaljow has made a number of recordings, including Puccini's La bohème, conducted by Bertrand de Billy in 2008; Leoncavallo's I Medici, conducted by Alberto Veronesi in 2010; and Mozart's Don Giovanni, conducted by Yannick Nézet-Séguin in 2012. All his recordings are on the Deutsche Grammophon label. He also appeared the 2008 film of La bohème directed by Robert Dornhelm.
