= Otto Kelmer =

German film director, author, artist, and psychoanalyst

- Born: 28 January 1948 (age 78); Bucharest, Romania
- Occupations: Film director, artist, author, psychoanalyst
- Years active: 1969–present
- Awards: 1993: The Golden Grimme Award; 1993: The Audience Award of the Marler Group 1994: Jury Prize at the Festival International du Film sur l'Art FIFA Montréal

Otto Kelmer ([ɔto: kɛlmɐ], born 28 January 1948) is a German film director, author, artist, and psychoanalyst.

== Life and work ==
Otto Kelmer was born in Bucharest in 1948 and emigrated with his parents to Germany in 1963. From 1966 to 1967 he studied script writing and directing at the Filmacademy Vienna. In the autumn of 1967, he took up his studies at Ruhr University Bochum, majoring in psychology, specializing in media sciences, and finally earning his doctorate in 1975 with the publication Television – Grandmaster of Violence?: The Unmasking of a Myth.

The German weekly newspaper Die Zeit offered Kelmer the opportunity to reach a wider audience through a full-page article in its cultural review. During this period Kelmer shot a number of shorts, including CAGE, which was shown at the International Short Film Festival Oberhausen in 1969.

In September 1979, German literary critic Marcel Reich-Ranicki published a selection of Kelmer's aphorisms in the Frankfurter Allgemeine Zeitung.

From 1979 to 1985, Kelmer was introduced to classical drawing and painting by two Romanian artists based in Germany and France, Serban Gabrea and Daniel Négo. In 1980, Kelmer’s drawing Uncontrolled multiplication of René Magritte was shown by the curators Maurice Rapin and Mirabelle Dors at the Salon Figuration Critique/Centre Culturel de la Rue du Louvre in Paris. After taking part in numerous group exhibitions at venues like Schloß Ringenberg Wesel in 1983 and Lehmbruck Museum in Duisburg in 1984, Kelmer was invited to exhibit his installation Tantalus' Dining Room at the avantgarde Galerie Löhrl in Mönchengladbach.

As well as pursuing his artistic activities, Kelmer completed his training as a psychoanalyst from 1982 to 1991 with professors Tobias Brocher and Edeltrud Meistermann-Seeger, both known for their unorthodox role in further developing the theory and practice of psychoanalysis.

Kelmer advanced his film studies under the mentorship of directors like Krzysztof Zanussi and Krzysztof Kieślowski as well as screenwriter Frank Daniel. Between 1991 and 1992, Kelmer wrote and directed the partly authentic, partly fictional The Secret Collection of Salvador Dalí for the German television channel ZDF. The film received numerous national and international accolades including the Grimme Award, the audience Award of the Marler Group for the best TV production of 1992, and the Prix du Jury at the International Festival of Films on Art FIFA in Montréal in 1994.

For the Dalí film, Kelmer created, among other art works, the sculpture Narcissistic Triptych or Mirroring Apollo, which has since been exhibited in the Film Museum Düsseldorf. The film was shown twice in the Centre Pompidou in Paris: in 1994 at the 4e Biennale Internationale du Film sur l´Art and in 2013 as part of the Salvador Dalí retrospective, curated by Jean-Hubert Martin.

As part of the exhibition Charade – Rochade at the Haubrok Collection Berlin in 2012, Kelmer's trailer for a not-yet-existing film was one of the most excitedly received and discussed exhibits.

== Distinctions ==
- 1993: The Golden Adolf-Grimme-Award for The Secret Collection of Salvador Dalí
- 1993: The Audience Award of the Marler Group for the best TV production of 1992 for The Secret Collection of Salvador Dalí
- 1994: Jury Prize at the Festival International du Film sur l'Art FIFA Montréal for La collection secrète de Salvador Dalí

== Bibliography ==
Books

- Breteau-Skira, Gisèle (1994). 4e Biennale Internationale du Film sur l'Art 19–24 octobre 1994 (in French). Paris: Presses Universitaires de France. ISBN 2-85850-811-9.
- Dors, Mirabelle; Rapin, Maurice (1980). Figuration critique, Salon, 16 juin-14 juillet 1980. Centre culturel de la rue du Louvre (in French). Paris: Figuration critique. ISBN 3-487-06908-3.
- Kelmer, Otto; Stein, Arnd (1975). Fernsehen: Aggressionsschule der Nation?: Die Entlarvung eines Mythos [Television-Grandmaster of Violence?: The Unmasking of a Myth] (in German). Bochum: Studienverlag Brockmeyer. ISBN 3-921543-21-5.
- Kelmer, Otto (2013). "Wer ist Michel Würthle? und Was ist die neue Geheime Sammlung des Salvador Dalí für ein Film?". In Haubrok, Axel (ed.). Charade - Rochade 08.09.2012-09.10.2012 Haubrokshows [Who is Michel Würthle? and The New Secret Collection of Salvador Dalí - What kind of Film is it Actually?] (in German). Distanz. ISBN 978-3-95476-006-0.
