= The Bad Life (novel) =

2005 novel by Frédéric Mitterrand

- Author: Frédéric Mitterrand
- Original title: La Mauvaise Vie
- Language: French
- Publication date: 2005
- Publication place: France

The Bad Life (French: La Mauvaise Vie) is a 2005 French novel by Frédéric Mitterrand, the Minister of Culture and Communication of France. The novel is partly autobiographical but fictionalized to a certain extent. The novel has been praised by critics for its "literary boldness" and "provocative examination of homosexuality".

In 2009, the novel caused controversy for its description of gay prostitution in Thailand, and Frederic Mitterrand was then accused of being a paedophile.
