= Allan Monk =

Canadian baritone singer

Allan James Monk
- Born: August 19, 1942 (age 83); Mission, British Columbia, Canada
- Occupation: baritone singer

Allan James Monk, OC (born August 19, 1942) is a Canadian baritone singer. He appeared in the 1982 film adaptation of La Traviata.

== Early life ==
Monk was born in Mission, British Columbia, and grew up in Burnaby, British Columbia, where both of his parents were involved in a musical chorus where Monk was first exposed to opera. In 1957 he and his family moved to Calgary. He started voice training with Elgar Higgin and he participated in summer programs at the Banff School of Fine Arts.

== Career ==
He was also a member of the Calgary Theatre Singers and played roles in productions of Carousel, Oklahoma!, Annie Get and Guys and Dolls. His first principal role was with the San Francisco Opera in 1966. In the USA his voice became famous when he attended Boris Goldovsky's summer workshops in 1963, 1964, 1966.

He moved to Teaneck, New Jersey, in the mid-1970s to be able to perform with the Metropolitan Opera.

He had his breakthrough in 1973, with Lucia di Lammermoor, Das Rheingold, L’Africaine, The Visit of the Old Lady.

In 1970s he performed at the Festival Canada for several years.

Having played various roles in different countries, he worked as visiting professor at the Eastman School of Music in Rochester, NY in 1997. After that he opened a private singing studio and teaching masterclasses.

== Awards ==
- Outstanding Young Artist of the Year, Musical America (1971)
- Artist of the Year, Canadian Music Council (1983)
- Officer, Order of Canada (1985)
- Golden Jubilee Medal, The Governor General of Canada (2012)

== Selected recordings ==
- Berlioz: Les Troyens, Plácido Domingo, Allan Monk (Chorèbe), John Cheek, Paul Plishka, Douglas Ahlstedt, Philip Creech, Claudia Catania, Jessye Norman, Tatiana Troyanos, Jocelyne Taillon; Metropolitan Opera orchestra and chorus,James Levine DVD: Deutsche Grammophon Cat: 00440 073 4310 CD: Laser Disc: Pioneer Artists Cat: PA-85-137 (1983)
