= Bohemian Club (disambiguation) =

The Bohemian Club is a gentlemen's club in San Francisco, California founded in 1872

Bohemian Club may also refer to:

- Bohemian Club (Chicago), a Czech social club founded in 1899
- Bohemian Football Club, an association football club in Dublin, Ireland
- Bohemian Sporting Club, a former association football club from the Philippines
