= Boehmians =

Mathematical objects

In mathematics, Boehmians are objects obtained by an abstract algebraic construction of "quotients of sequences." The original construction was motivated by regular operators introduced by T. K. Boehme. Regular operators are a subclass of Mikusiński operators, that are defined as equivalence classes of convolution quotients of functions on $[0,\infty )$. The original construction of Boehmians gives us a space of generalized functions that includes all regular operators and has the algebraic character of convolution quotients. On the other hand, it includes all distributions eliminating the restriction of regular operators to $[0,\infty )$.

Since the Boehmians were introduced in 1981, the framework of Boehmians has been used to define a variety of spaces of generalized functions on $\mathbb{R}^N$ and generalized integral transforms on those spaces. It was also applied to function spaces on other domains, like locally compact groups and manifolds.

== The general construction of Boehmians ==
Let $X$ be an arbitrary nonempty set and let $G$ be a commutative semigroup acting on $X$. Let $\Delta$ be a collection of sequences of elements of $G$ such that the following two conditions are satisfied:

(1) If $(\phi_n), (\psi_n) \in \Delta$, then $(\phi_n\psi_n) \in \Delta$,

(2) If $x,y\in X$ and $\phi_n x = \phi_n y$ for some $(\phi_n) \in \Delta$ and all $n\in\mathbb{N}$, then $x=y$.

Now we define a set of pairs of sequences:

$\mathcal{A} = \{ ((x_n),(\phi_n)) : x_n\in X, (\phi_n)\in \Delta, \phi_m x_n =\phi_n x_m \text{ for all } m, n\in \mathbb{N} \}$.

In $\mathcal{A}$ we introduce an equivalence relation:

$((x_n),(\phi_n))$ ~ $((y_n),(\psi_n))$ if $\phi_m y_n =\psi_n x_m \text{ for all } m, n\in \mathbb{N}$.

The space of Boehmians $\mathcal{B} (X,\Delta )$ is the space of equivalence classes of $\mathcal{A}$, that is $\mathcal{B} (X,\Delta )=\mathcal{A}/$~.
