= Theater Osnabrück =

Theater in Osnabrück, Germany

Coordinates: 52°16′36″N 8°02′40″E

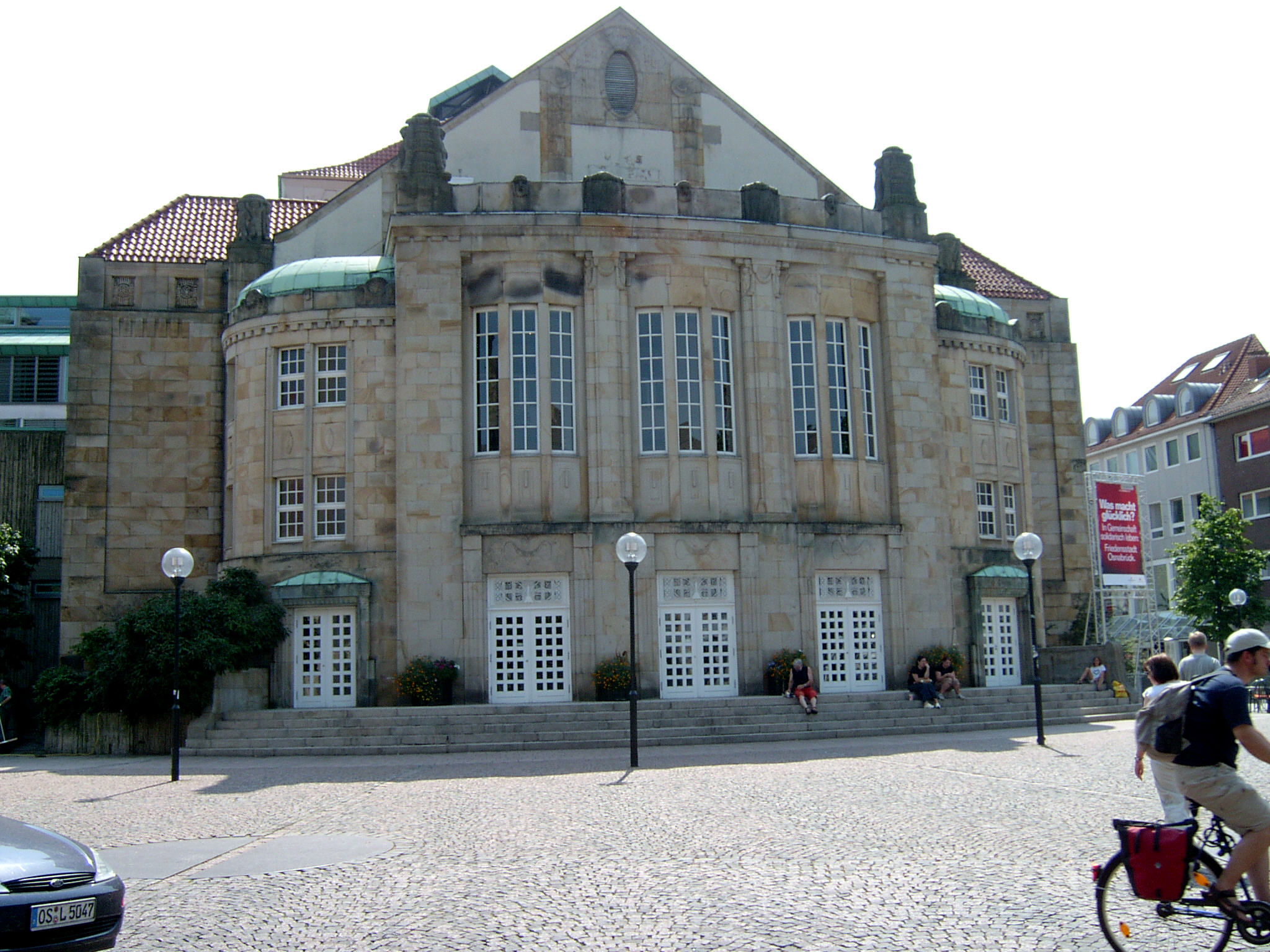
Osnabrücks Theater at Domhof

Theater Osnabrück is a German theatre in Osnabrück, Germany. It operates under the auspices of the Städtische Bühnen Osnabrück gGmbH. The primary performance venues are the Theater am Domhof (seating capacity 642) and the emma-theater (seating capacity 96).

The roots of the company date back to 1771, with theatrical presentations at the Schloss Osnabrück. In 1780, productions shifted to two former aristocratic residences. Albert Lortzing had an official affiliation with the company from 1827 to 1833. In 1832, the city of Osnabrück took over the complex as its first municipal theatre.

From 1905 to 1909, the main theatre was built. On 29 September 1909, Julius Caesar was the first play to be staged at the newly completed theatre. The Domhof building suffered damage from bombing in 1945 during World War II. British military authorities banned theatrical performances after the war, lifting the ban in July 1945. Reconstruction and restoration of the Domhof began in 1949, and was completed in 1950.

Since 2011, Ralf Waldschmidt has served as Intendant of the theatre. Since 2012, the company's Generalmusikdirektor (GMD) has been Andreas Hotz.

== Literature ==
- Stefan Hüpping: Von den Städtischen Bühnen zum Deutschen Nationaltheater Osnabrück, WiKu-Verlag., Duisburg 2006 ISBN 3-86553-177-6
