= Frank Valentino =

American baritone (1907–1991)

Valentino, ca. 1940s

Frank Valentino (January 6, 1907 – June 14, 1991) was an American operatic baritone. He is perhaps best remembered for his performances under Arturo Toscanini.

== Life and career ==
Born Francis Valentine Dinhaupt in New York in 1907, Valentino and his family moved to Denver when he was eleven and he began to study music there. In 1926 he went to Italy to further his studies and made his debut at Parma (the Teatro Regio) as Giorgio Germont in La traviata the following year. An Italian producer decided his name was "too American" and renamed him Francesco Valentino. During the late 1920s and 1930s, Valentino performed at the major European theaters including La Scala (Arsenio in Refice's Margherita da Cortona, 1938) and Glyndebourne (the title part in Macbeth, 1947). He was part of the world premiere of Dallapiccola's serial opera, Volo di notte, at the Teatro della Pergola in Florence on May 18, 1940.

Valentino returned to America in 1940 where he began an association with the Metropolitan Opera, appearing in twenty-six roles over twenty-one seasons and never missing a scheduled performance. His debut was in Lucia di Lammermoor (opposite Lily Pons in 1940; in 1956, he sang in the same opera alongside Maria Callas), and was then seen in Il trovatore, Don Pasquale, Un ballo in maschera, Cavalleria rusticana, Pagliacci, Alceste, Rigoletto, La bohème, Faust, Le nozze di Figaro, Il barbiere di Siviglia, La forza del destino, La traviata, Carmen, Aida (with Herva Nelli in her Met debut), Roméo et Juliette, Madama Butterfly, Boris Godounov (as Rangoni), La Gioconda, L'elisir d'amore, Don Carlos, Manon, and Andrea Chénier. His final appearance there was in La bohème, in 1961.

He also appeared with other major American companies including the San Francisco Opera and the Philadelphia Grand Opera Company. Additionally, he performed in many recitals and concerts; most notably the 50th anniversary NBC concert broadcasts of Puccini's La bohème (with Licia Albanese, Jan Peerce, and Anne McKnight) under Arturo Toscanini in 1946, which were published as a recording on RCA. In 1947, the baritone recorded the same work in the studio for Columbia (with Bidu Sayão). In 1962 he retired from singing and joined the faculty of the Peabody Conservatory of Music and taught for fifteen years until retiring in 1977.

In 1955, the baritone appeared on "Opera Cameos," in an abridged version of La traviata, over the DuMont Television Network, and a kinescope was preserved.

Valentino was married to Edith Taylor until her death in 1975. During his years at Peabody he lived in Severna Park, Maryland, later moving to Fairfax, Virginia, where he died, of renal failure, at age eighty-four. He was a Roman Catholic.
