= La Bohème (2008 film) =

2008 Austrian-German film

La bohème
- Directed by: Robert Dornhelm
- Written by: Giuseppe Giacosa; Luigi Illica
- Based on: La bohème 1896 opera by Giacomo Puccini
- Produced by: Oliver Auspitz; Andreas Kamm; Jan Mojto; Kurt J. Mrkwicka
- Starring: Anna Netrebko; Rolando Villazón; Nicole Cabell
- Cinematography: Walter Kindler
- Edited by: Klaus Hundsbichler; Ingrid Koller
- Music by: Giacomo Puccini
- Production company: UNITEL
- Distributed by: Constantin Film (Austria); NFP (Germany)
- Release dates: 17 October 2008 (Austria); 23 October 2008 (Germany)
- Running time: 115 minutes
- Countries: Austria; Germany
- Language: Italian

La bohème (also known as La bohème de Puccini) is a 2008 Austrian-German film of an opera directed by Robert Dornhelm. It is based on Giacomo Puccini's 1896 opera La bohème.

== Cast ==
- Anna Netrebko as Mimì
- Rolando Villazón as Rodolfo
- Nicole Cabell as Musetta
- George von Bergen as Marcello (sung by Boaz Daniel)
- Vitalij Kowaljow as Colline
- Adrian Eröd as Schaunard (sung by Stéphane Degout)
- Ioan Holender as Alcindoro

== Reception ==
CineMagazine rated it 3 stars. The soundtrack recording was selected as an "Editor's Choice" by Gramophone magazine in June 2008.
