= Adrian Eröd =

Austrian opera singer (born 1970)

Adrian Eröd (Hungarian: Erőd Adrián) (born 1970) is an Austrian operatic baritone. He is the son of composer Iván Erőd.

== Career ==
After his studies with Walter Berry and Franz Lukasovsky at the University of Music and Performing Arts Vienna, Adrian successfully participated in several competitions. He won the George London scholarship, and 1998 he was awarded the Eberhard-Wächter-Medal for his interpretations of the title role in Benjamin Britten's Billy Budd and of Count Almaviva in Mozart's Le nozze di Figaro.

Since 2003, Adrian Eröd is employed at Wiener Staatsoper, where he debuted in 2001 as Mercutio in Roméo et Juliette. His roles at the Wiener Staatsoper includes Papageno (The Magic Flute), Beckmesser (Die Meistersinger von Nürnberg), Marcello (La Bohème), Count Almaviva (Le nozze di Figaro), Figaro (Il barbiere di Siviglia), Lescaut (Manon by Massenet and Manon Lescaut by Puccini), Paolo (Simon Boccanegra), Don Giulio Gesualdo (Gesualdo), Dr. Falke (Die Fledermaus), Guglielmo (Così fan tutte), Albert (Werther) and De Siriex (Fedora). In spring 2009 he received dazzling reviews for his interpretation of the role of Loge in Das Rheingold, a part usually sung by a tenor.

Apart from his engagement at Wiener Staatsoper, Adrian Eröd has sung with the Vienna Chamber Opera, the Mozart Festival in Schönbrunn, the New Opera in Vienna, Bregenz Landestheater, Landestheater in Linz, the Salzburger Landestheater and at Sommerfestival KlangBogen Wien. At Linz Landestheater, where he was employed 1997, he sang Figaro (Rossini: Il barbiere di Siviglia), Dandini (Rossini: La Cenerentola), Marcello (Puccini: La Bohème), Pelléas (Debussy: Pelléas et Mélisande) and Olivier (Strauss: Capriccio). Between 2000 and 2003 he was an ensemble member of the Vienna Volksoper. At the Volksoper his roles included Don Giovanni (Mozart: Don Giovanni), Prosdocimo (Rossini: Il Turco in Italia) and Peter (Lortzing: Zar und Zimmermann). In July 2009 Eröd made his debut at Bayreuther Festspiele as Sixtus Beckmesser in Die Meistersinger von Nürnberg.

Adrian Eröd is a frequently engaged concert singer and works with such leading conductors as Nikolaus Harnoncourt, Sir Simon Rattle, Riccardo Muti, Helmuth Rilling and Fabio Luisi. His concert repertoire includes among other works Bach's Magnificat, St.John Passion and St Matthew Passion, Haydn's Creation mass, Mahler's song cycles and Das Lied von der Erde (in version for tenor and baritone), Mendelssohn's Elijah, Brahms’ Ein deutsches Requiem, masses by Schubert and Mozart, Orff's Carmina Burana as well as Zemlinsky's Lyrische Symphonie, Zeisl's Requiem ebraico and Iván Erőd's Schwarzerde.

Important engagements in 2009 and 2010 were Prospero in Thomas Adés The Tempest at Oper Frankfurt, Sixtus Beckmesser in Die Meistersinger von Nürnberg at Opernhaus Zürich, Jason in the world premiere of Aribert Reimann's opera Medea at Wiener Staatsoper as well as Valentin (Faust), Count Almaviva (Le nozze di Figaro), Figaro (Il barbiere di Siviglia), Loge (Das Rheingold) and Albert (Werther), also at Wiener Staatsoper.

== Season 2010/2011 ==
The summer 2010 Adrian Eröd will return both to Opernhaus Zürich and to the Bayreuther Festspiele as Beckmesser in Die Meistersinger. The opera season 2010/2011 he will sing Figaro (Il barbiere di Siviglia), Jason (Medea), Dr Falke (Die Fledermaus), Albert (Werther), Loge (Das Rheingold), Valentin (Faust) and the title role in Benjamin Britten's Billy Budd at Wiener Staatsoper. Late in spring 2011, Adrian Eröd travels to Japan to sing Gugliemo in Così fan tutte at New National Theatre Tokyo and in the summer to Bayreuth for his third season as Beckmesser in Die Meistersinger.

The concert season includes performances with Münchner Rundfunkorchester in Munich, with Deutsche Radio Philharmonie in Frankfurt as well as orchestral concerts and recitals at Musikverein in Vienna. Adrian Eröd will also make his UK debut this season with Schubert's Winterreise at the Schubertiad 2010 in Perth.

== Honours and awards ==
- 2017 Österreichischer Kammersänger

== Discography ==
CDs

- J. Strauss Jr: Edition - Vol 51, Marco Polo 1996
- F. Schubert: Magnificat in C major, Carus 1997
- E. Kalman: Die Csardasfurstin, Oehms Classics 2002
- R. Benatzky: Bezauberndes Fräulein, Preiser 2002
- H. Reiter: Messe für St Augustin, Kirchenmusik St. Augustin 2004
- E. Zeisl: Letzter Tanz, ORF 2005
- F. Liszt: Complete Songs Vol.1 - Kling Leise, mein Lied, Marsyas 2010
- G. Kuhr: Paradisi Gloria 21, BR-Klassik 2010
- C. Gounod: Faust, Valentin, Wiener Staatsoper live, Orfeo 2010
- E. Wellesz: Werke für Kammerorchester, CPO 2010
- F. Schubert: Winterreise, Gramola 2010

DVDs

- N Rota: Aladdin und die Wunderlampe, Magier, live recording from Wiener Staatsoper 2005
- J. Massenet: Werther, Albert, live recording from Wiener Staatsoper February 2005, TDK DVD 2005
- R. Wagner: Wagners Nibelungenring für Kinder, Wotan, live recording from Wiener Staatsoper 2007
- R. Wagner: Die Meistersinger von Nürnberg, Sixtus Beckmesser, live recording from Wiener Staatsoper January 2008, Euroarts 2009
- G. Puccini: La Bohème – The Film, Schaunard (acting), Kultur 2009
- R. Wagner: from Das Rheingold, Loge, "Über Stock und Stein" – Ioan Holender Farewell Concert, Deutsche Grammophon 2010
- A. Reimann: Medea, Jason, Arthaus Musik 2010
