= Luca Canonici =

Italian opera singer

Luca Canonici (born 22 September 1960) is an Italian opera singer who has had an active career singing leading tenor roles both in Europe and his native Italy.

== Biography ==
Canonici was born in Montevarchi in the Province of Arezzo. He made his debut at the Teatro dell'Opera di Roma in 1985 as the Duke of Mantua in Rigoletto and went on to establish an international career performing at many leading opera houses and concert halls, including La Scala, Covent Garden, Vienna State Opera, Teatro Comunale Florence, Opernhaus Zürich, Bayerische Staatsoper, Teatro Real in Madrid, Salzburg Festival, Opéra National de Paris, La Fenice, Concertgebouw in Amsterdam, Accademia Nazionale di Santa Cecilia in Rome, Teatro Regio di Parma, Rossini Opera Festival in Pesaro, Teatro San Carlo in Naples, and Teatro Massimo in Palermo.

In recent years his performances have included Les mamelles de Tirésias at the Macerata Festival and the Teatro Lirico in Cagliari; Paisiello's Il barbiere di Siviglia in Sassari; Nabucco at the Teatro della Fortuna in Fano; L'enfant et les sortilèges at the Teatro Piccinni in Bari, Teatro Filarmonico di Verona and the Teatro Valli di Reggio Emilia; Il cappello di paglia di Firenze at the Teatro Massimo in Palermo and Teatro Regio in Turin; Verdi Requiem with the Orchestra Verdi di Milano conducted by Riccardo Chailly; La vedova allegra at the Teatro Filarmonico di Verona, and L'heure espagnole at the Teatre Principal in Palma de Mallorca.

Since 2008, he has been Artistic Director of Opera Festival, a cultural association created in 1997 which organizes classical music events, shows and festivals in Florence and Tuscany. During his tenure as Artistic Director, he has worked with the Orchestra del Maggio Musicale Fiorentino, the Tuscany Regional Orchestra and with the Tuscan Sun Festival, organizing concerts, recitals and new productions of The Barber of Seville, Aida, Die Zauberflöte, La traviata, La bohème, Gianni Schicchi, Don Giovanni, Carmina Burana, Verdi Requiem, and Ravel's Boléro.

An art lover with long experience in the antiques trade, he has worked as an expert with private television stations, creating and presenting programs devoted to art. In 2010 he was appointed Director of the Museum of Sacred Art in Montevarchi, his native town. That same year he took part in the 60th Sanremo Music Festival where he won second place. After his success at Sanremo, which sparked a new career in crossover and pop music, he recorded the pop album Italia, amore mio.

== Recordings ==
Canonici's operatic discography includes La sonnambula (Nuova Era), Il Signor Bruschino (Claves), Don Pasquale (Erato), La grande notte di Verona (Arthaus Musik), La favorite and La cambiale di matrimonio (Ricordi), Linda di Chamounix (Europa Records), Falstaff conducted by Georg Solti (Decca), and the Verdi Requiem conducted by John Eliot Gardiner (Philips). He also played Rodolfo in Luigi Comencini's film adaptation of La bohème, although José Carreras sang the role on the soundtrack.
