= Gino Quilico =

Canadian operatic baritone

Gino Quilico OC CQ
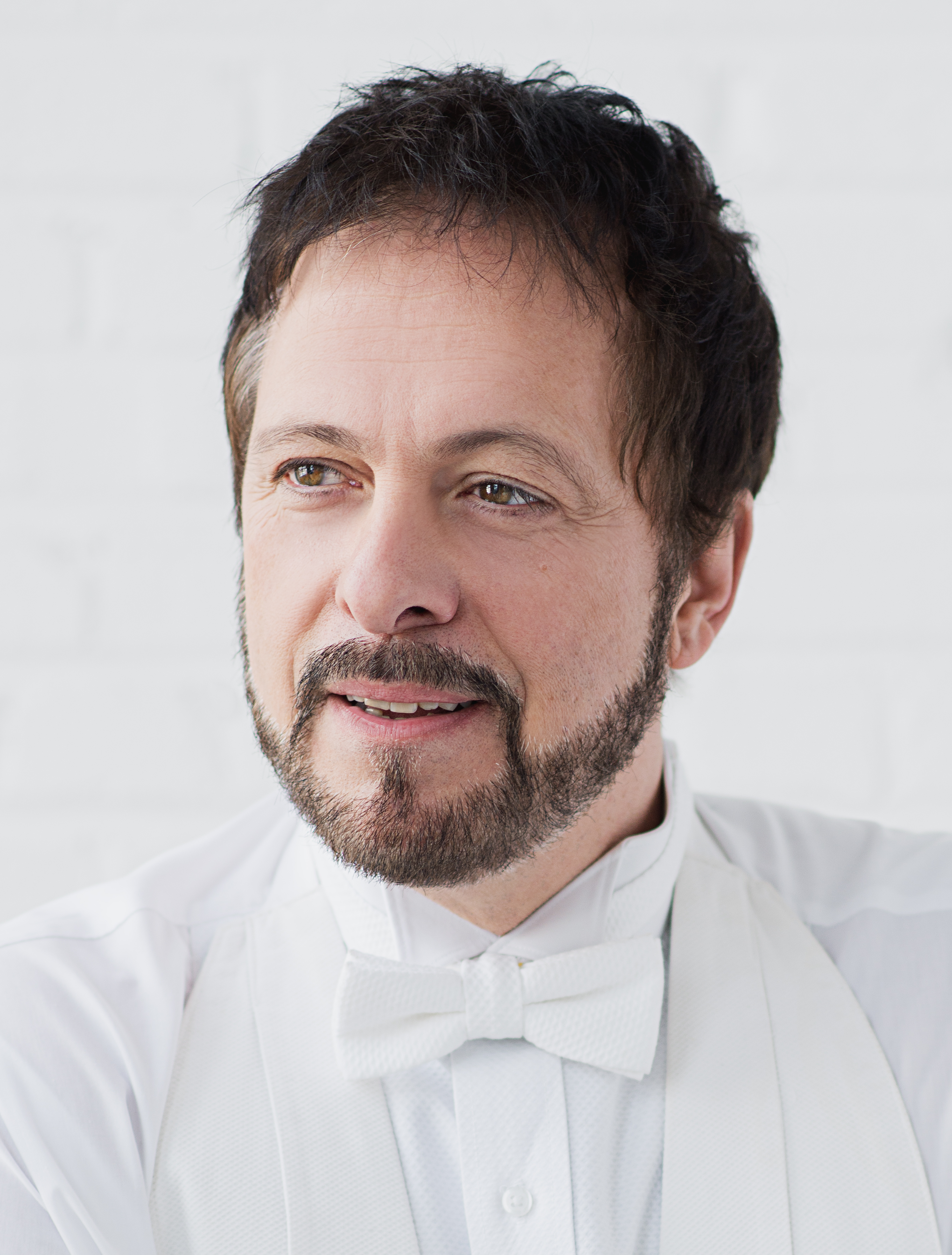
- Born: April 29, 1955 (age 70); New York City, New York, U.S.
- Occupation: singer
- Years active: 1977–present

Gino Quilico OC, CQ (born April 29, 1955) is an American-Canadian operatic baritone.

Quilico was born in Flushing, New York City, in 1955, the son of baritone Louis Quilico and pianist Lina Pizzolongo. He studied at the University of Toronto Opera School from 1976 to 1978, making his operatic debut as Mr. Gobineau in Giancarlo Menotti's The Medium. He performed with the Canadian Opera Company in 1977 and 1979.

Quilico continued his studies at the Ecole d'art lyrique of the Paris Opera in 1979–80, then began an international career with performances at the Paris Opera, Covent Garden in London, La Scala in Milan, and the Bavarian State Opera in Munich.

At the Metropolitan Opera he created the role of Figaro in The Ghosts of Versailles by John Corigliano in 1991.

Quilico was appointed an Officer of the Order of Canada in 1992 and a knight of the National Order of Quebec in 2024. In 1996, he received the Grammy Award for Best Opera Recording for his recording of Les Troyens by Hector Berlioz with the Montreal Symphony Orchestra.
