= Richard Cowan (bass-baritone) =

American opera singer (1957–2015)

- Born: December 24, 1957; Euclid, Ohio, U.S.
- Died: November 16, 2015 (aged 58) Pittsburgh, Pennsylvania, U.S.
- Genres: Opera
- Instruments: Vocals
- Education: Indiana University School of Music

Richard Cowan (December 24, 1957 – November 16, 2015) was an American operatic bass-baritone. A national finalist in the 1985 Metropolitan Opera National Council Auditions and winner of the Grand Prize in the 1987 Concours International de Chant de Paris, Cowan sang leading roles in the opera houses of Europe and North America and was the artistic director of the Lyrique en Mer opera festival in Belle Île, which he founded in 1998.

== Early life and education ==
Cowan was born in Euclid, Ohio, and attended Euclid High School. He earned a degree in opera and composition from the Indiana University School of Music in 1981.

== Career ==
Cowan apprenticed first with Central City Opera and Michigan Opera Theatre and then joined the Lyric Opera of Chicago's Center for American Artists in 1983. He made his Chicago debut in 1983 as The Priest in the company premiere of Lady Macbeth of Mtsensk and by 1988 had appeared there in Carmen, Arabella, and Die Frau ohne Schatten. He later appeared in two more company premieres: Antony in Barber's Antony and Cleopatra (1991) and John Sorel in Menotti's The Consul (1996).

His European debut came in 1985 when on the invitation of Bruno Bartoletti, he sang The Animal Trainer and The Athlete in Alban Berg's Lulu at the Maggio Musicale in Florence, roles he would later reprise in Chicago and at San Francisco Opera. In 1985 he was a National Finalist in the Metropolitan Opera National Council Auditions and in 1987 won the Grand Prize in the Concours International de Chant de Paris. Cowan made his Metropolitan Opera debut in 1990 on the opening night of the season as Schaunard in La bohème and went on to perform there as Guglielmo in Così fan tutte and in the title role of Don Giovanni, a role he would sing many times in the opera houses of North America and Europe. His other leading roles have included Bluebeard in Bartók's Bluebeard's Castle (Deutsche Oper in Berlin, Opera de Geneve, Melbourne, Liege, and the RAI National Symphony Orchestra in Turin), Escamillo in Carmen (Chicago, Toronto), Jokanaan in Salome (Miami, Minneapolis, Vancouver), and Nick Shadow in Stravinsky's The Rake's Progress (Spoleto Festival).

Cowan was the artistic director of Lyrique en Mer, Festival de Belle Île in France. He founded the festival in 1998, and has directed various works at the island's Citadelle Vauban such as Otello, Rigoletto, La traviata, Don Giovanni, Così fan tutte, Le nozze di Figaro, Dido and Aeneas, La Cenerentola, and Carmen. He has taught classical voice at Roosevelt University in Chicago, Northern Kentucky University, and Carnegie Mellon University.

== Personal life ==
Cowan died after a long illness on November 16, 2015, in Pittsburgh, Pennsylvania.

== Recordings ==
- La Bohème (1988) – Chœur de Radio France and Maîtrise de Radio France; Orchestre national de France; James Conlon, conductor. Label: Erato
- Madame Butterfly (1995) – Chœurs et Maîtrise de Radio France; Orchestre national de France; James Conlon, conductor. Label: Sony Classical

== Filmography ==
- Schaunard in La Bohème (1988 feature film of the opera, directed by Luigi Comencini)
- Sharpless in Madame Butterfly (1995 feature film of the opera, directed by Frédéric Mitterrand)
- Dr. Clovis Vincent in Ravel's Brain (2001 television documentary on Maurice Ravel, directed by Larry Weinstein)
