= Frédéric Mitterrand =

French politician (1947–2024)

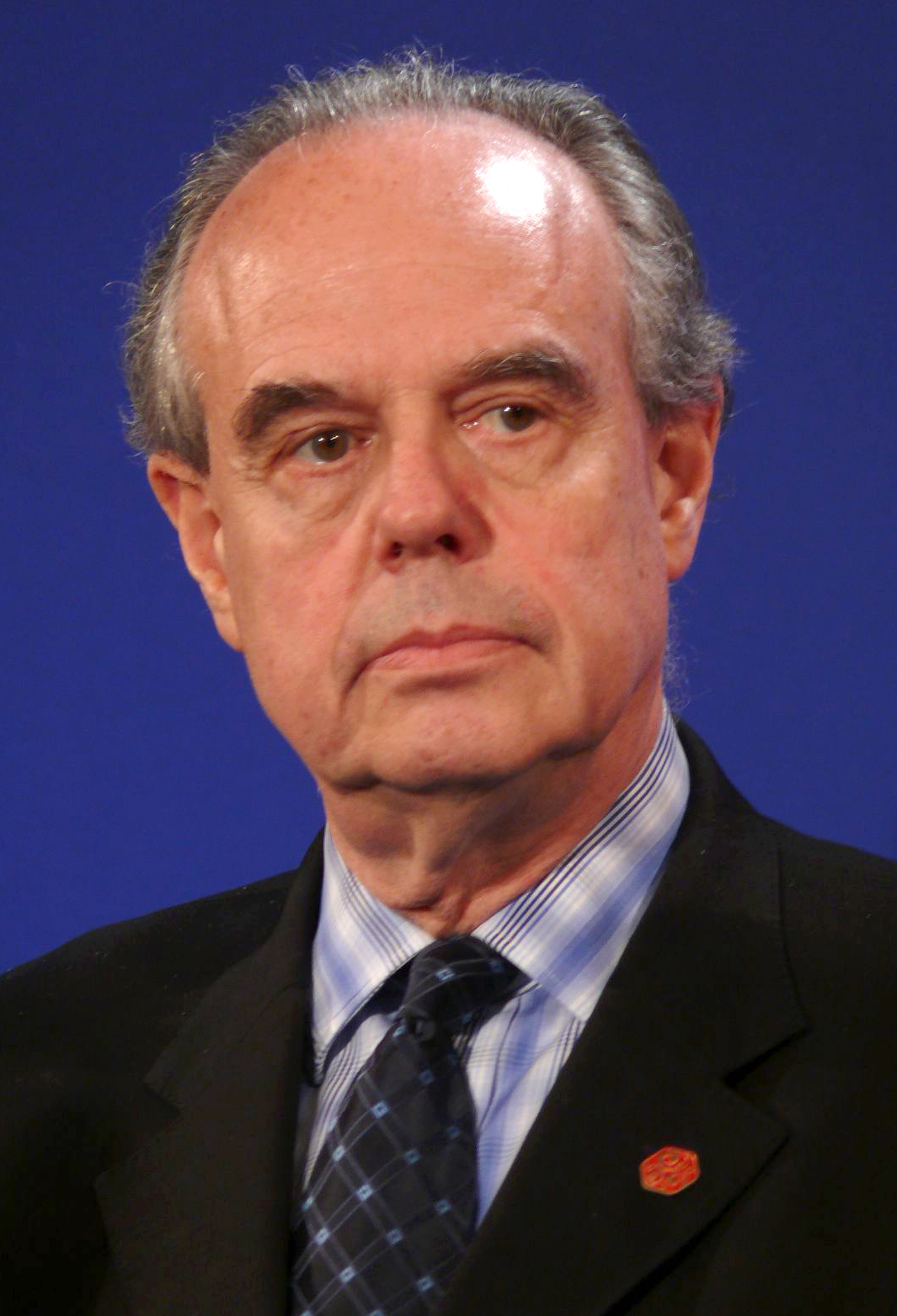
- Mitterrand in 2010

Minister of Culture and Communication
- In office 23 June 2009 – 16 May 2012
- Prime Minister: François Fillon
- Preceded by: Christine Albanel
- Succeeded by: Aurélie Filippetti

Personal details
- Born: 21 August 1947 Paris, France
- Died: 21 March 2024 (aged 76) Paris, France
- Relatives: François Mitterrand (uncle); Jean-Christophe Mitterrand (cousin); Mazarine Pingeot (cousin); Eugène Deloncle (grand-uncle)
- Education: Sciences Po

Frédéric Mitterrand (French: [fʁedeʁik mitɛʁɑ̃]; 21 August 1947 – 21 March 2024) was a French actor, screenwriter, producer, and politician who served as Minister of Culture and Communication of France from 2009 to 2012 under President Nicolas Sarkozy.

== Early life and career ==
Born in Paris, he was the nephew of François Mitterrand (1916–1996), who was the president of France from 1981 to 1995, and the son of engineer Robert Mitterrand (1914–2002) and Édith Cahier, the niece of Eugène Deloncle, the co-founder of "La Cagoule". Owing to his family heritage, Mitterrand acquired Tunisian citizenship in 1995. He was openly bisexual.

Mitterrand attended the Lycée Janson de Sailly in Paris and studied history and geography at the Paris West University Nanterre La Défense, and political science at Sciences Po. He taught economics, history, and geography at EABJM from 1968 to 1971. In 1978, he was a film critic at J'informe. From 1971 to 1986, he ran several art film cinemas in Paris (Olympic Palace, Entrepôt, and Olympic-Entrepôt). He also had roles in a number of films, and in the 1980s was active as a producer and director in TV productions. Mitterrand also penned a monthly column for Têtu.

In June 2008, Mitterrand was appointed the director of the French Academy in Rome by President Nicolas Sarkozy, and was appointed to the French government a year later as the Minister of Culture and Communications, a role he would hold for the remainder of Sarkozy's time in office.

== Controversy surrounding The Bad Life ==
Mitterrand's novel The Bad Life (French: La mauvaise vie), which mixed autobiographical and fictionalised elements, was the source of significant controversy. In the book he detailed his "delight" whilst visiting the male brothels of Bangkok, and wrote ..."I got into the habit of paying for boys ... The profusion of young, very attractive and immediately available boys put me in a state of desire I no longer needed to restrain or hide." Mitterrand's writings were applauded for their honesty at time of release, but resurfaced in a different light four years later following his defence of Roman Polanski, who had been detained in Switzerland and awaiting extradition to face American charges for sexually abusing a minor.

On 5 October 2009, Marine Le Pen quoted sections of the book on French television, accusing him of having sex with underage boys and engaging in "sex tourism", demanding that Mitterrand resign from the government. He was also criticised by then-Socialist Party spokesman Benoît Hamon, who stated that "as a minister of culture, he has drawn attention to himself by defending [Polanski], and he has written a book where he said he took advantage of sexual tourism. To say the least, I find it shocking." On the other hand, he received support from a close aide to Nicolas Sarkozy who said the French President backed his Culture Minister, describing the controversy around him as "pathetic".

The novel's mixture of fact and fiction complicated his defense; while Mitterrand insisted that book was not an autobiography, the publisher described it as a "novel inspired by autobiography", and was similarly described as an "autobiographical novel" by the BBC. In his own defence. Mitterrand stated, "Each time I was with people who were my age, or who were five years younger – there wasn't the slightest ambiguity – and who were consenting", and that he uses the term "boys" loosely, both in his life and in the book. He also declared, "I condemn sexual tourism, which is a disgrace. I condemn paedophilia, which I have never in any way participated in."

== Death ==
Following a year-long illness, Frédéric Mitterrand died from cancer on 21 March 2024, at the age of 76.

== Filmography ==
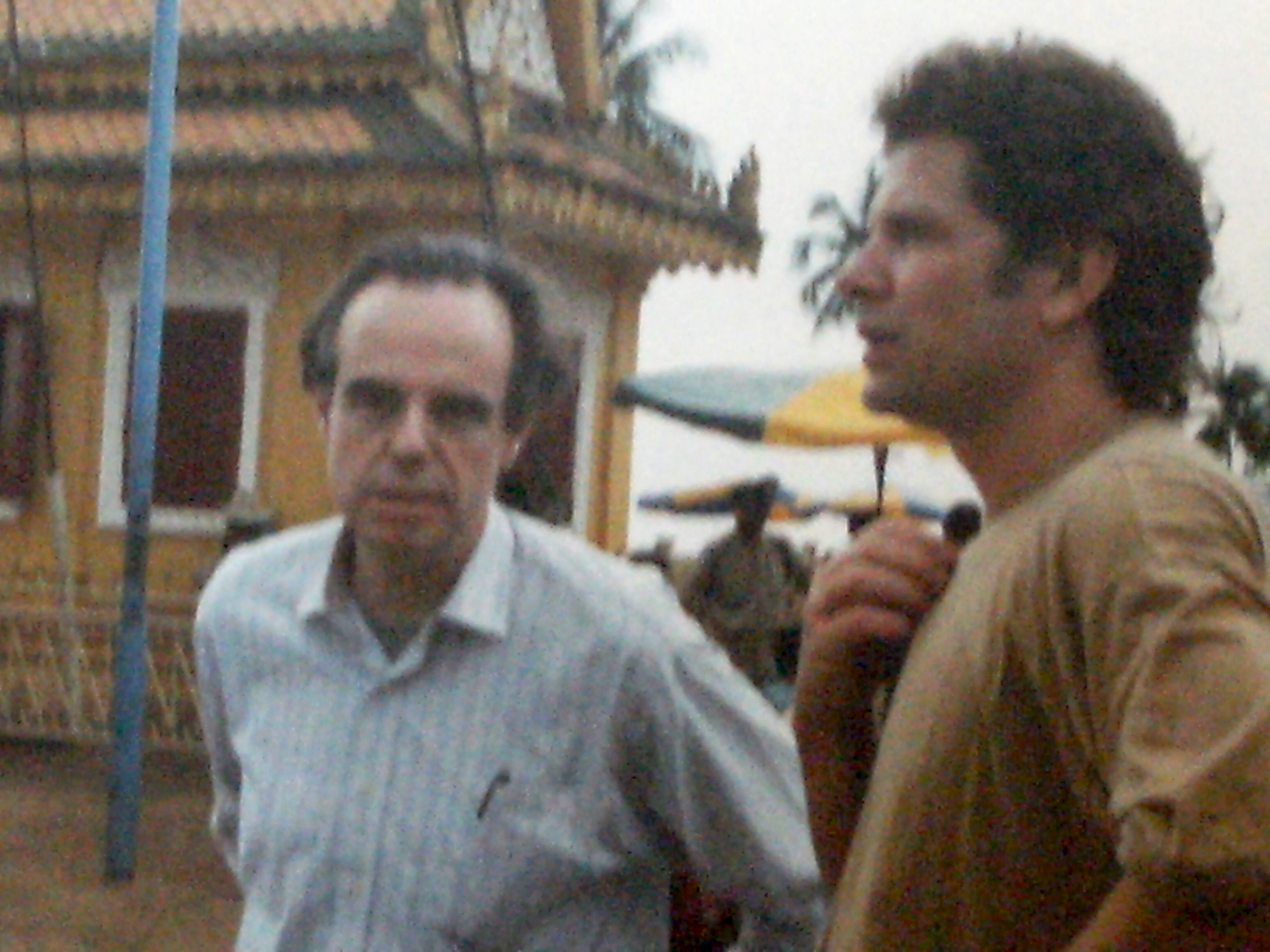
Mitterrand (left) at a 1990 film shoot

Actor

- 1960: Fortunat
- 1992: La collection secrète de Salvador Dalí by Otto Kelmer
- 1997: Mon copain Rachid, by Philippe Barassat
- 1998: Que la lumière soit, by Arthur Joffé
- 2001: Le Fabuleux Destin d'Amélie Poulain by Jean-Pierre Jeunet

Director

- 1981: Lettres d'amour en Somalie
- 1984: Paris vu par… vingt ans plus tard
- 1995: Madame Butterfly, adaption of the Puccini opera

Producer

- Les Aigles foudroyés, documentary
- Mémoires d'exil, documentary
- Fairouz, documentary, 1998
- Je suis la Folle de Brejnev, 2001
- FARAH: The Last Empress, documentary 2009

== Publications ==
- Tous désirs confondus, Actes Sud, 1988, new ed. 2009
- Mémoires d'exil, Robert Laffont, 1990, ISBN 978-2-221-09023-7
- Destins d'étoiles – tomes 1, 2, 3, 4 – Fixot, 1991–1992
- Monte Carlo: la légende, Assouline, 1993
- Une saison tunisienne, sous la direction de Frédéric Mitterrand et Soraya Elyes-Ferchichi, Actes Sud, 1995
- L'Ange bleu: un film de Joseph von Sternberg, Plume, 1995
- Madame Butterfly, Plume, 1995
- Les Aigles foudroyés – la fin des Romanov des Habsbourg et des Hohenzollern, Pocket, 1998
- Un jour dans le siècle, Robert Laffont, 2000
- La Mauvaise Vie, Robert Laffont, 2005
- Lettres d'amour en Somalie, Pocket, September 2006
- Maroc, 1900–1960 Un certain regard, avec Abdellah Taïa, Actes Sud, 2007
- Le Festival de Cannes, Robert Laffont, 2007
- Le désir et la chance, Robert Laffont, 2012
- La récréation, Robert Laffont, 2013

== Honours ==
=== National honours ===
- France: Former Chancellor Officer of the Order of the Legion of Honour
- France: Former Chancellor Officer of the National Order of Merit
- France: Former Chancellor Commander of the Order of Arts and Letters, 1st Class

=== Foreign honours ===
- Monaco: Knight Officer of the Order of Cultural Merit
- Romanian Royal Family: Knight Commander of the Order of the Crown
- Romanian Royal Family: Knight of the Royal Decoration of the Cross of the Romanian Royal House

Political offices
Preceded by Christine Albanel	Minister of Culture; 2009–2012	Succeeded by Aurélie Filippetti
