= Anne McKnight =

Operatic soprano

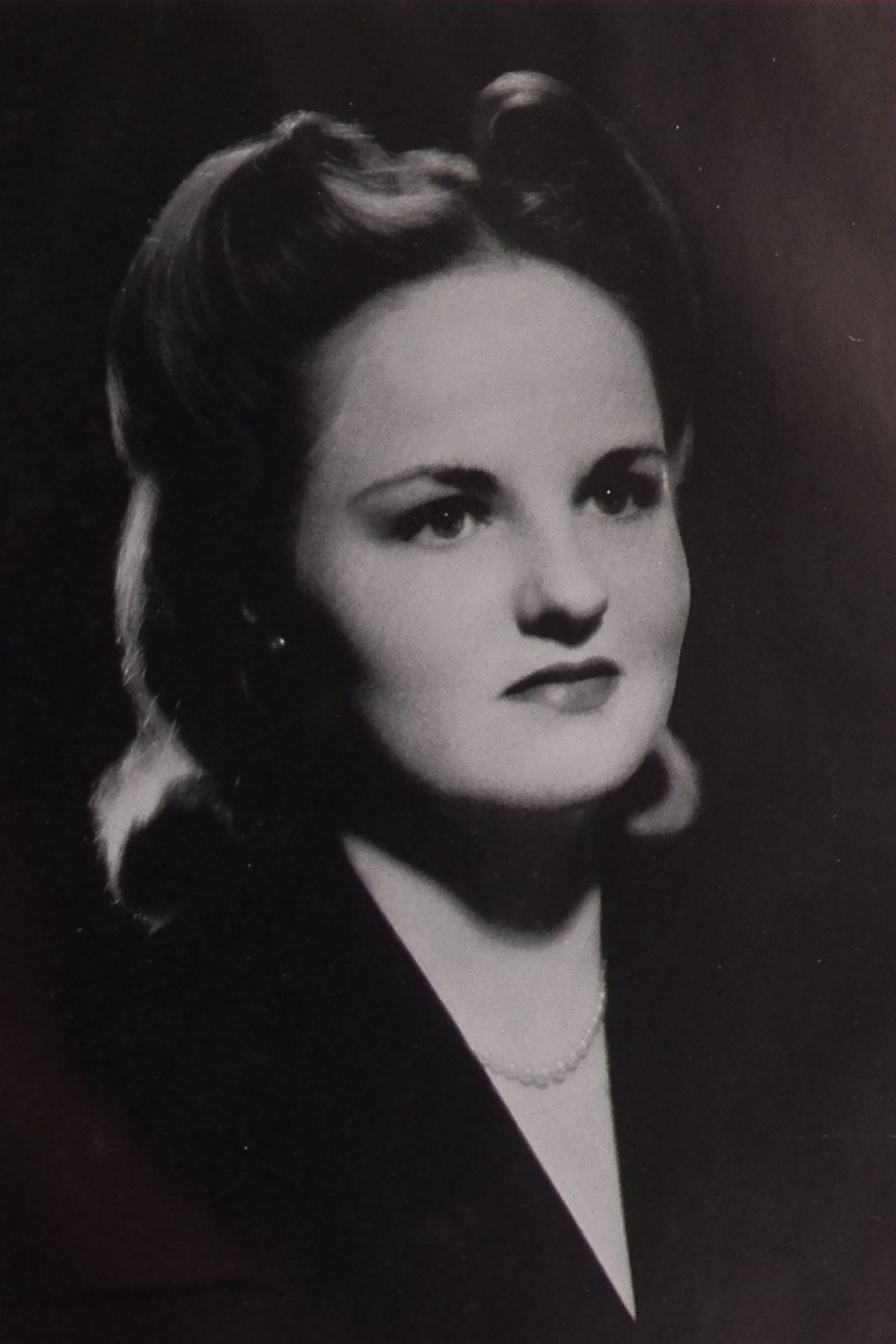
Anne McKnight as "May Queen" at Shimer College in 1943.

Anne McKnight (24 July 1924 – 29 August 2012) was an operatic soprano. In Italy she used the stage name Anna de Cavalieri.

== Life and career ==
Anna de Cavalieri (Anne McKnight) in La Gioconda, photo with 1954 dedication.

Anna de Cavalieri (Anne McKnight) in Aida, photo with 1954 dedication.

A native of Aurora, Illinois, she was a 1943 graduate of Shimer College. McKnight made her official debut in 1946, as Musetta in the NBC Symphony's Concert Version of La bohème, with Licia Albanese and Jan Peerce, conducted by Arturo Toscanini. Two years later, she sang in Beethoven's Ninth Symphony under the Maestro.

McKnight opened the 1952 Fall Season of the New York City Opera, in the title role of Tosca, followed by the name part in Aïda, both conducted by Tullio Serafin. In 1953, the soprano sang there again in Tosca (now led by Julius Rudel), Don Giovanni (as Donna Elvira, opposite Walter Cassel), Aïda again, Der Rosenkavalier (as the Marschallin), and Le nozze di Figaro (as the Contessa).

She then began a career in Italy, under the name Anna de Cavalieri, appearing at the Teatro di San Carlo (as Busoni's Turandot and Gluck's Alceste, and as Asteria in Boito's Nerone), Teatro alla Scala (Alfano's Cyrano de Bergerac, and as Elena in Mefistofele), Rome Opera, Caracalla (Loreley), Arena di Verona (Aïda), and Teatro Regio (Parma).

In 1960, the soprano returned to the City Opera, as Anne McKnight, for the "professional" American premiere of Dallapiccola's Il prigioniero, opposite Norman Treigle and Richard Cassilly, conducted by Leopold Stokowski. Later that season, she sang again the Marschallin with the company.

She continued her international career at Rio de Janeiro (Puccini's Turandot and Tosca), Piacenza, Rovigo, Brussels, Cremona (Fedora), Toulouse (Norma), and, in 1968, Padua (Tosca).

McKnight died on August 29, 2012, at the age of eighty-eight, at her home in Lugano, Switzerland.

== Commercial discography ==
- Puccini: La bohème (Albanese, Peerce, Valentino, Cehanovsky, Moscona; Toscanini, 1946) [live] RCA
- Verdi: "Aida" (De Cavalieri, Malaniuk, Bertocci, Colombo, Dari, Trama, Bertelli; Opera di Roma - Barbini - 1958 (Studio) CONCERT HALL
- Dallapiccola: Il prigioniero (Cassilly, Treigle; Stokowski, 1960) [live] Opera Depot

== Commercial videography ==
- Beethoven: Symphony No. 9 (Hobson, Dillon, Scott; Toscanini, 1948) [live] RCA
