= Rigoletto discography =

This is a list of recordings of Rigoletto, an 1851 opera by Giuseppe Verdi with an Italian libretto by Francesco Maria Piave based on the 1832 play Le roi s'amuse by Victor Hugo. It was first performed at La Fenice in Venice on 11 March 1851.

== Recordings ==
Year	Cast (Rigoletto, Duke of Mantua, Gilda, Sparafucile, Maddalena)	Conductor, Opera house and orchestra	Label
1915–18	Antonio Armentano Anticorona, Fernando De Lucia, Angela de Angelis, Luis Muñoz, Vida Ferluga	Salvatore Sassano; San Carlo orchestra and chorus, Naples	LP: Phonotype
1916	Cesare Formichi, Giuseppe Taccani, Ines Maria Ferraris, Vincenzo Bettoni, G Caiani	Lorenzo Molajoli; Teatro alla Scala orchestra and chorus	LP: Columbia Records; Cat: D 17732-17747
1917	Giuseppe Danise, Carlo Broccardi, Ayres Borghi-Zerni, Vincenzo Bettoni, Nelda Garrone	Carlo Sabajno; Teatro alla Scala orchestra and chorus	LP: Bongiovanni; Cat: GB 1024
1927–28	Luigi Piazza, Tino Folgar, Lina Pagliughi, Salvatore Baccaloni, Vera de Christoff	Carlo Sabajno; Teatro alla Scala orchestra and chorus	CD: Radiex; Cat: RXC1113-14
1927	Riccardo Stracciari, Dino Borgioli, Mercedes Capsir, Ernesto Dominici, Anna Masetti-Bassi	Lorenzo Molajoli; Teatro alla Scala orchestra and chorus	LP: Columbia Records; Cat: GQX 10028-10042; CD: Aura Music; Cat: LRC 11099-2
1935	Lawrence Tibbett, Frederick Jagel (act 1) / Jan Kiepura (act 2), Lily Pons, Virgilio Lazzari, Helen Olheim	Ettore Panizza; Metropolitan Opera orchestra and chorus	CD: Naxos Historical; Cat: 8.110020-1
1944	Heinrich Schlusnus, Helge Rosvaenge, Erna Berger, Josef Greindl, Margarete Klose	Robert Heger, Berlin State Opera orchestra and chorus (performed in German translation)	LP: Heliodor; Cat: 2700 702; CD: Berlin Classics; Cat: 0033002 BC
1945	Jussi Björling, Leonard Warren; Bidu Sayão, Norman Cordon, Martha Lipton	Cesare Sodero; Metropolitan Opera orchestra and chorus	CD: Naxos Historical; Cat: 8.110051-52
1950	Leonard Warren, Jan Peerce, Erna Berger, Italo Tajo, Nan Merriman	Renato Cellini; RCA Victor Orchestra; Robert Shaw Chorale	LP: RCA Victrola; Cat: AVM2-0698; CD: RCA Red Seal; Cat: 88883729002
1950	Josef Metternich, Rudolf Schock, Rita Streich, Wilhelm Lang, Margarete Klose	Ferenc Fricsay, Deutsches Symphonie-Orchester Berlin, RIAS Kammerchor	CD: Myto Records; Cat: 945111
1952	Piero Campolonghi, Giuseppe Di Stefano, Maria Callas, Alberto Herrera, Gilberto Cerda	Umberto Mugnai, Palacio de Bellas Artes orchestra and chorus	LP: Melodram; Cat: MEL 405; CD: Mondo Musica; Cat: MMO 91112
1954	Giuseppe Taddei, Ferruccio Tagliavini, Lina Pagliughi, Giulio Neri, Irma Colasanti	Angelo Questa; RAI Orchestra Sinfonica and chorus	CD: Warner-Fonit; Cat: 8573 82647-2
1954	Aldo Protti, Mario Del Monaco, Hilde Gueden, Cesare Siepi, Giulietta Simionato	Alberto Erede; Accademia di Santa Cecilia orchestra and chorus	CD: Decca; Cat: 440242
1955	Tito Gobbi, Giuseppe Di Stefano, Maria Callas, Nicola Zaccaria, Adriana Lazzarini	Tullio Serafin, Teatro alla Scala orchestra and chorus	CD: EMI Classics; Cat: 747469
1956	Robert Merrill, Jussi Björling, Roberta Peters, Giorgio Tozzi, Anna Maria Rota	Jonel Perlea, Teatro dell'Opera di Roma orchestra and chorus	LP: RCA Victrola; Cat: VIC-6041; CD: RCA Victor; Cat: 60172-2-RG
1960	Ettore Bastianini, Alfredo Kraus, Renata Scotto, Ivo Vinco, Fiorenza Cossotto	Gianandrea Gavazzeni, Maggio Musicale Fiorentino orchestra and chorus	CD: >BMG Classics-Ricordi; Cat: 74321 68779 2
1961	Cornell MacNeil, Renato Cioni, Joan Sutherland, Cesare Siepi, Stefania Malagu	Nino Sanzogno, Accademia di Santa Cecilia orchestra and chorus	CD: Decca; Cat: 443 853-2
1961	Cornell MacNeil, Gianni Raimondi, Leyla Gencer, Jorge Algorta, Carmen Burello	Argeo Quadri, Buenos Aires Philharmonic and Chorus	CD: Myto Records; Cat: 3225
1963	Robert Merrill, Alfredo Kraus, Anna Moffo, Ezio Flagello, Rosalind Elias	Georg Solti, RCA Italiana Orchestra and chorus	LP: RCA Red Seal; Cat: LSC-7027; CD: RCA Red Seal; Cat: 88875073425
1963	Nicolae Herlea, Ion Buzea, Magda Ianculescu, Nicolae Rafael, Dorothea Palade	Jean Bobescu, Romanian Opera Bucharest orchestra and chorus	CD: VOXBOX; Cat: CDX5162
1964	Dietrich Fischer-Dieskau, Carlo Bergonzi, Renata Scotto, Ivo Vinco, Fiorenza Cossotto	Rafael Kubelík, Teatro alla Scala orchestra and chorus	CD: Deutsche Grammophon; Cat: 477 5608
1967	Cornell MacNeil, Nicolai Gedda, Reri Grist, Agostino Ferrin, Anna di Stasio	Francesco Molinari-Pradelli, Teatro dell'Opera di Roma orchestra and chorus	CD: EMI Classics; Cat: 3932822
1971	Sherrill Milnes, Luciano Pavarotti, Joan Sutherland, Martti Talvela, Huguette Tourangeau	Richard Bonynge, London Symphony Orchestra; Ambrosian Opera Chorus	CD: Decca; Cat: 414-269-2
1977	Rolando Panerai, Franco Bonisolli, Margherita Rinaldi, Bengt Rundgren, Viorica Cortez	Francesco Molinari-Pradelli, Staatskapelle Dresden; State Opera Dresden Chorus	CD: Arts Music; Cat: 43073; DVD: Encore; Cat: 2022
1977	Cornell MacNeil, Plácido Domingo, Ileana Cotrubaș, Justino Díaz, Isola Jones	James Levine, Metropolitan Opera orchestra and chorus (Production: John Dexter)	DVD: Deutsche Grammophon; Cat: 00440 073 0930; Met Opera on Demand
1978	Sherrill Milnes, Alfredo Kraus, Beverly Sills, Samuel Ramey, Mignon Dunn	Julius Rudel, Philharmonia Orchestra; Ambrosian Chorus	CD: EMI Classics; Cat: CMS 5 66037-2
1979	Piero Cappuccilli, Plácido Domingo, Ileana Cotrubaș, Nicolai Ghiaurov, Elena Obraztsova	Carlo Maria Giulini, Vienna Philharmonic; Vienna State Opera Chorus	CD: Deutsche Grammophon; Cat: 457 753-2
1981	Louis Quilico, Luciano Pavarotti, Christiane Eda-Pierre, Ara Berberian, Isola Jones	James Levine, Metropolitan Opera (Production: John Dexter) (Performance of 15 December)	Streaming SD video Met Opera on Demand
1982	Ingvar Wixell, Luciano Pavarotti, Edita Gruberová, Ferruccio Furlanetto, Victoria Vergara	Riccardo Chailly, Vienna Philharmonic; Vienna State Opera Chorus (film by Jean-Pierre Ponnelle)	DVD: Deutsche Grammophon; Cat: 00440 073 4166 7 DVD: Decca; Cat: 071401
1984	Renato Bruson, Neil Shicoff, Edita Gruberová, Robert Lloyd, Brigitte Fassbaender	Giuseppe Sinopoli, Accademia di Santa Cecilia orchestra and chorus	CD: Decca; Cat: 470 437-2
1985	Bernd Weikl, Giacomo Aragall, Lucia Popp, Jan-Hendrik Rootering, Klara Takacs	Lamberto Gardelli, Bavarian Radio Symphony Orchestra and chorus	CD: Eurodisc; Cat: 610 115; BMG-RCA; Cat: 74321 25286-2
1988	Giorgio Zancanaro, Vincenzo La Scola, Daniela Dessì, Paata Burchuladze, Martha Senn	Riccardo Muti, Teatro alla Scala orchestra and chorus	CD: EMI Classics; Cat: 7 49605-2
1989	Leo Nucci, Luciano Pavarotti, June Anderson, Nicolai Ghiaurov, Shirley Verrett	Riccardo Chailly, Teatro Comunale di Bologna orchestra and chorus	CD: Decca; Cat: 425 864-2
1993	Vladimir Chernov, Luciano Pavarotti, Cheryl Studer, Roberto Scandiuzzi, Denyce Graves	James Levine, Metropolitan Opera orchestra and chorus	CD: Deutsche Grammophon; Cat: 447 064-2
1994	Renato Bruson, Roberto Alagna, Andrea Rost, Silvestro Sammaritano, Mariana Pentcheva	Riccardo Muti, Teatro alla Scala orchestra and chorus	CD: Sony Classical; Cat: S2K 66314
1999	John Rawnsley, Arthur Davies, Helen Field, John Tomlinson, Jean Rigby	Mark Elder, English National Opera orchestra and chorus	CD: Chandos; Cat: CHAN 3030
2001	Leo Nucci, Aquiles Machado, Inva Mula, Mario Luperi, Milena Josipovic	Marcello Viotti, Arena di Verona orchestra and chorus (Stage director:Charles Roubaud)	DVD: Arthaus Musik; Cat: 107096
2002	Paolo Gavanelli, Marcelo Álvarez, Christine Schäfer, Eric Halfvarson, Graciela Araya	Edward Downes, Royal Opera House orchestra and chorus (Stage director: David McVicar)	DVD: Opus Arte; Cat: OA0829D
2004	Carlos Álvarez, Marcelo Álvarez, Inva Mula, Julian Konstantinov, Nino Surguladze	Jesús López Cobos, Liceu orchestra and chorus (Stage director: Graham Vick)	DVD: Arthaus Musik; Cat: 107147
2006	Leo Nucci, Piotr Beczała, Elena Moșuc, László Polgár, Katharina Peetz	Nello Santi, Zurich Opera orchestra and chorus (Stage director: Gilberto Deflo)	DVD: Arthaus Musik; Cat: 108057
2008	Leo Nucci, Francesco Demuro, Nino Machaidze, Marco Spotti, Stefanie Irányi	Massimo Zanetti, Teatro Regio di Parma orchestra and chorus (Stage director: Stefano Vizioli)	DVD: C Major; Cat: 723208
2013	Željko Lučić, Piotr Beczała, Diana Damrau, Stefan Kocán, Oksana Volkova	Michele Mariotti, Metropolitan Opera (Production: Michael Mayer) (Performance of 16 February)	Streaming HD video Met Opera on Demand
2015	George Petean, Saimir Pirgu, Aleksandra Kurzak, Andrea Mastroni, Judith Schmid	Fabio Luisi, Orchestra and chorus of the Oper Zürich, Tatjana Gürbaca, stage director	DVD: Accentus MusicCat:PHR0203
2016	Quinn Kelsey, Michael Fabiano, Olga Peretyatko, Rafal Siwek, Vesselina Kasarova	Nicola Luisotti, Paris Opera Orchestra & Chorus (Stage director: Claus Guth; recorded live, Opéra Bastille)	Full HD: Paris Opera Play
2017	Dmitri Hvorostovsky, Francesco Demuro, Nadine Sierra, Andrea Mastroni, Oksana Volkova	Constantine Orbelian, Kaunas Symphony Orchestra, Kaunas State Choir	DVD:Delos; Cat:DE3522
2019	Vladimir Stoyanov, Stephen Costello, Mélissa Petit, Miklós Sebestyén, Katrin Wundsam	Enrique Mazzola, Wiener Symphoniker, (Stage director: Philipp Stölzl)	DVD:C Major; Cat: 751704
2022	Quinn Kelsey, Piotr Beczała, Rosa Feola, Andrea Mastroni, Varduhi Abrahamyan	Daniele Rustioni, Metropolitan Opera (Production: Bartlett Sher) (Performance of 29 January)	Streaming HD video Met Opera on Demand
