= Gottbegnadeten list =

List of artists considered crucial to National Socialist culture

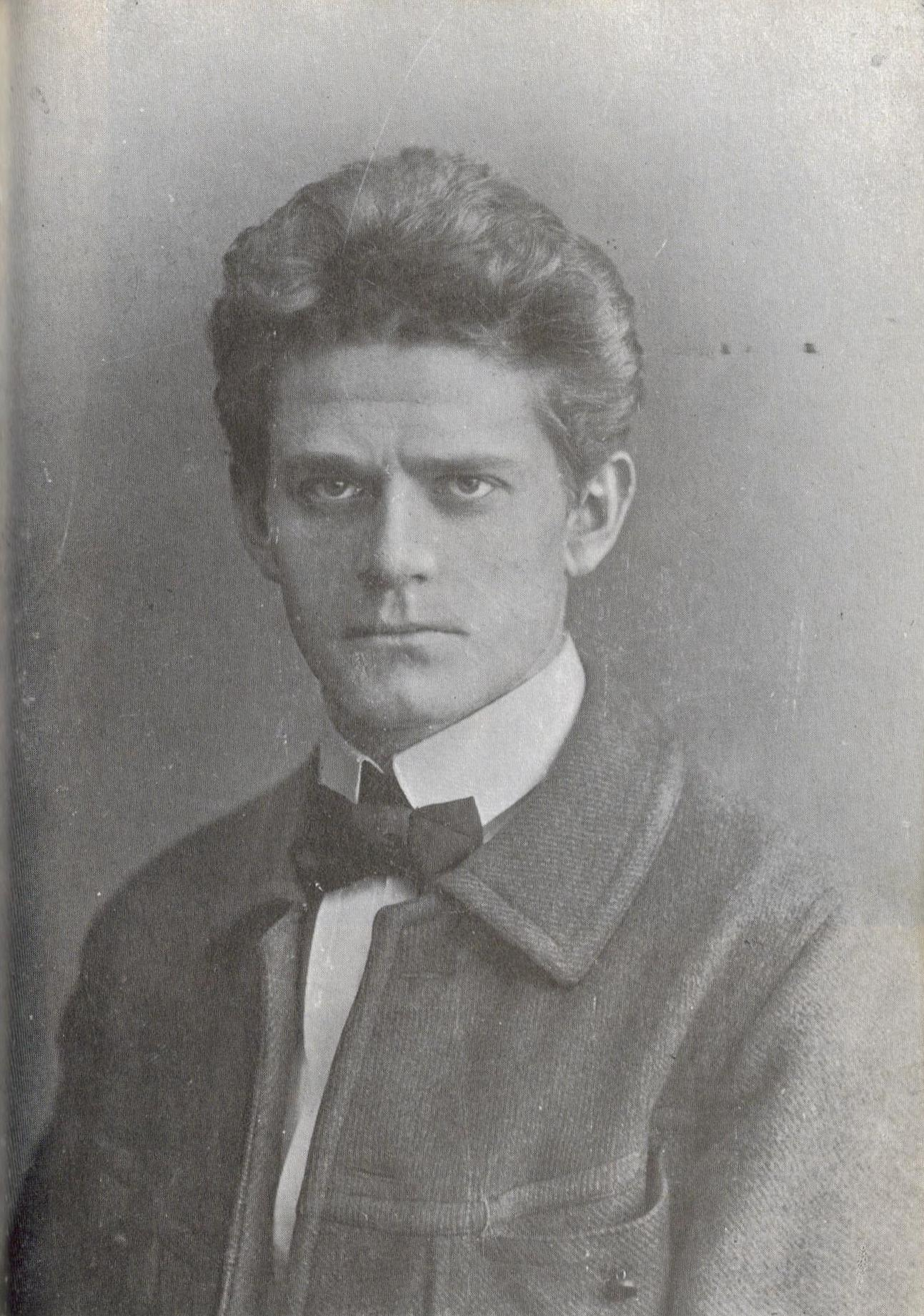
Friedrich Kayßler, one of the "irreplaceable actors" on the list

The Gottbegnadeten-Liste ("God-gifted list" or "Important Artist Exempt List") was a 36-page list of artists considered crucial to National Socialist culture. The list was assembled in September 1944 by Joseph Goebbels, the head of the Ministry of Public Enlightenment and Propaganda, and Germany's supreme leader Adolf Hitler.

== History ==
The list exempted the designated artists from military mobilisation during the final stages of World War II. Each listed artist received a letter from the German Propaganda Ministry which certified his or her status. A total of 1,041 names of artists, architects, music conductors, singers, writers and filmmakers appeared on the list. Of that number, 24 were named as especially indispensable; they thus became the equivalent of National Socialism's "national treasures".

Goebbels included about 640 motion picture actors, writers and directors on an extended version of the list. They were to be protected as part of his propaganda film efforts, which persisted through the end of the war (and culminating in the expensive final UFA production Kolberg, released in January 1945).

Many of the cultural figures appearing on the list are no longer widely remembered but there are exceptions, including a number of renowned classical musicians such as the composers Richard Strauss, Hans Pfitzner, and Carl Orff, the orchestral conductors Wilhelm Furtwängler and Herbert von Karajan, and the Wagnerian baritone Rudolf Bockelmann. The only foreigner (Ausländer) on the list was Dutch actor Johannes Heesters.

== Special listed artists ==
=== Architects ===
- architect Leonhard Gall (1884–1952), "Reichskultursenator"
- architect Hermann Giesler (1898–1987), "Reichskultursenator"
- architect Wilhelm Kreis (1873–1955)
- architect and critic Paul Schultze-Naumburg (1869–1949)

=== Visual artists ===
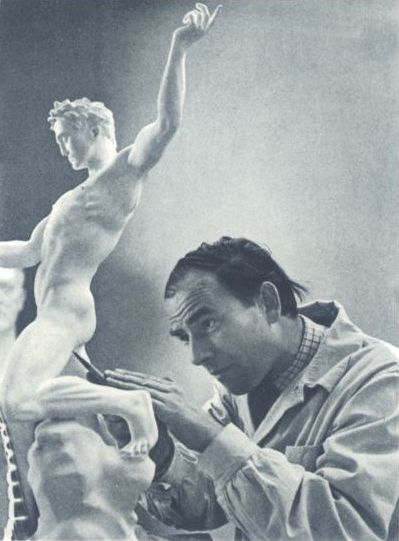
Sculptor Arno Breker

- sculptor Arno Breker (1900–1991), named as "Reichskultursenator" (Reich Culture Senator)
- sculptor Fritz Klimsch (1870–1960)
- sculptor Georg Kolbe (1877–1947)
- sculptor Josef Thorak (1889–1952)
- history painter Arthur Kampf (1864–1950)
- painter Werner Peiner (1897–1984)

=== Authors ===
- Gerhart Hauptmann (1862–1946)
- Hans Carossa (1878–1956)
- Hanns Johst (1890–1979), "Reichskultursenator"
- Erwin Guido Kolbenheyer (1878–1962)
- Agnes Miegel (1879–1964)
- Ina Seidel (1885–1974)

=== Musicians ===
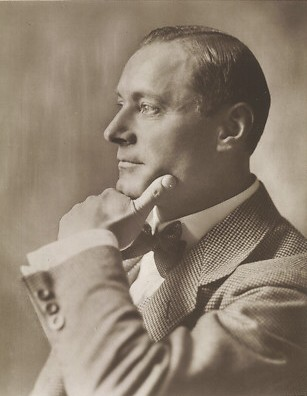
Actor Heinrich Schroth

- Richard Strauss (1864–1949)
- Hans Pfitzner (1869–1949)
- Wilhelm Furtwängler (1886–1954) (removed on December 7, 1944 because of his relationships with German resistance.)

=== Actors ===
- Otto Falckenberg (1873–1947)
- Gustaf Gründgens (1899–1963)
- Johannes Heesters (1903–2011)
- Friedrich Kayßler (1874–1945)
- Eugen Klöpfer (1886–1950)
- Karl Kneidinger (1882–1952)
- Hermine Körner (1878–1960)
- Heinz Rühmann (1902–1994)
- Heinrich Schroth (1871–1945)

=== Singers ===
- Rudolf Bockelmann (1892–1958)
- Josef Greindl (1912–1993)
- Heinrich Schlusnus (1888–1952)
- Wilhelm Strienz (1899–1987)
- Peter Anders (1908-1954)

== Further listed artists on the "Führerliste" ==
There was also an extended list, the so-called "Führerliste" that included "God-gifted artists" who were not to be drafted but worked as "Künstler im Kriegseinsatz" (artists in the war effort).

=== Authors ===
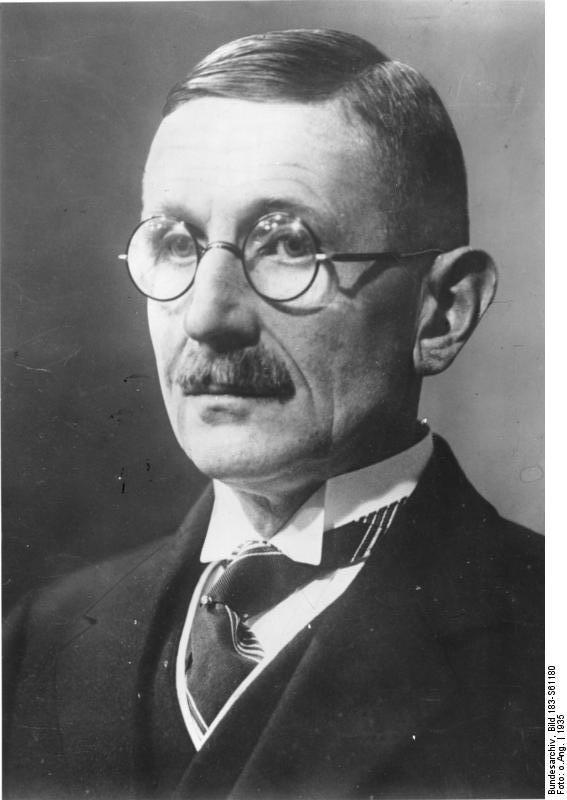
Writer Hans Grimm

- Hans Friedrich Blunck (1888–1961)
- Friedrich Griese (1890–1975)
- Josef Weinheber (1892–1945)
- Gustav Frenssen (1863–1945)
- Hans Grimm (1875–1959)
- Max Halbe (1865–1944)
- Heinrich Lilienfein (1879–1952)
- Börries Freiherr von Münchhausen (1874–1945)
- Wilhelm Schäfer (1868–1952)
- Helene Voigt-Diederichs (1875–1961)

=== Composers ===
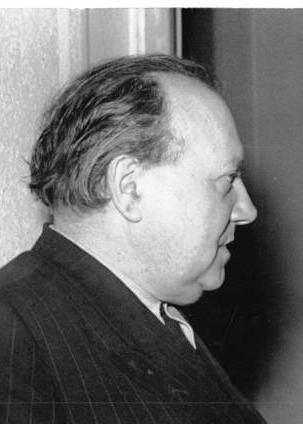
Conductor and composer Ottmar Gerster

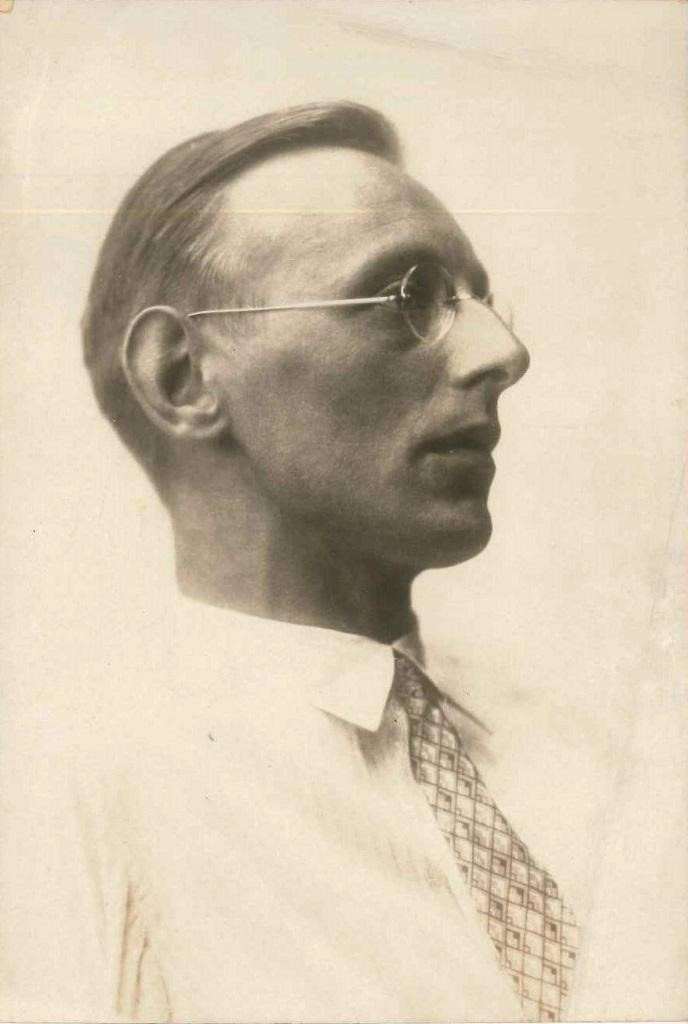
Composer Carl Orff

- Johann Nepomuk David (1895–1977)
- Werner Egk (1901–1983)
- Gerhard Frommel (1906–1984)
- Harald Genzmer (1909–2007)
- Ottmar Gerster (1897–1969)
- Kurt Hessenberg (1908–1994)
- Paul Höffer (1895–1949)
- Karl Höller (1907–1987)
- Mark Lothar (1902–1985)
- Joseph Marx (1882–1964)
- Gottfried Müller (1914–1993)
- Carl Orff (1895–1982)
- Ernst Pepping (1901–1981)
- Max Trapp (1887–1971)
- Fried Walter (1907–1996)
- Hermann Zilcher (1881–1948)

=== Conductors ===
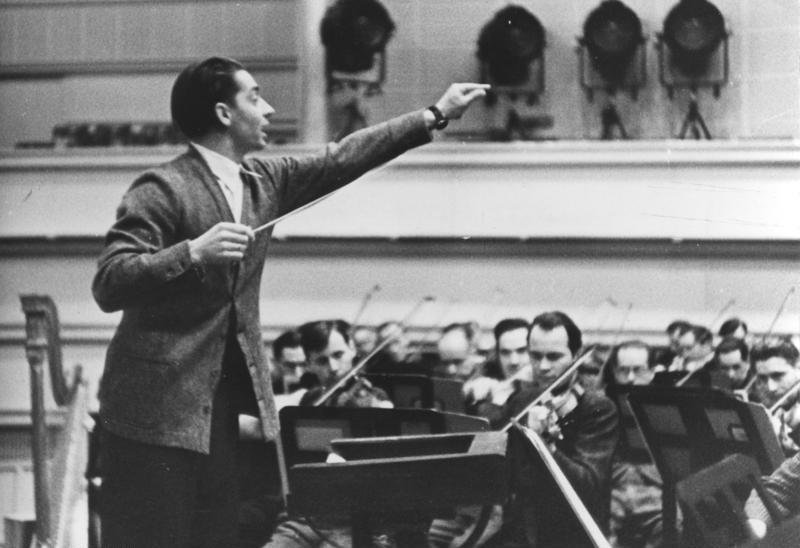
Conductor Herbert von Karajan

- Hermann Abendroth (1883–1956)
- Karl Elmendorff (1891–1962)
- Robert Heger (1886–1978)
- Oswald Kabasta (1896–1946)
- Herbert von Karajan (1908–1989)
- Johannes Schüler (1894–1966)
- Karl Böhm (1894–1981)
- Eugen Jochum (1902–1987)
- Hans Knappertsbusch (1888–1965)
- Joseph Keilberth (1908–1968)
- Rudolf Krasselt (1879–1954)
- Clemens Krauss (1893–1954)
- Hans Schmidt-Isserstedt (1900–1973)
- Carl Schuricht (1880–1967)

=== Instrumentalists ===
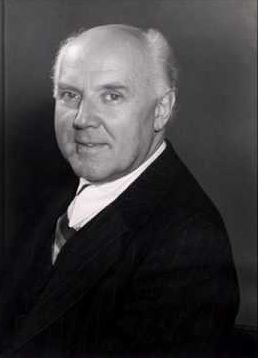
Composer and pianist Walter Gieseking

- Ludwig Hoelscher (1907–1996), cellist
- Elly Ney (1882–1968), pianist
- Walter Morse Rummel (1887–1953), pianist
- Günther Ramin (1898–1956), organist and choirmaster
- Walter Gieseking (1895–1956), pianist
- Wilhelm Stross (1907–1966), violinist
- Gerhard Taschner (1922–1976), violinist

=== Theater and opera ===
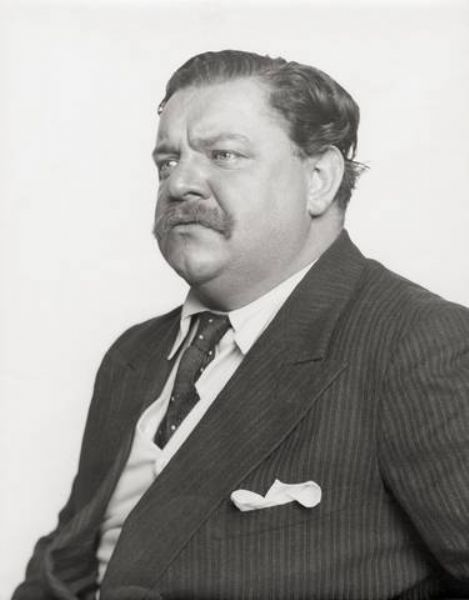
Actor Heinrich George

- Raoul Aslan (1886–1958), director and actor
- Heinrich George (1893–1946), actor
- Werner Krauß (1884–1959), actor
- Karl-Heinz Stroux (1908–1985), actor and director
- Heinrich Schlusnus (1888–1952), singer
- Wilhelm Strienz (1899–1987), singer
- Paula Wessely (1907–2000), actress

=== Fine Arts ===
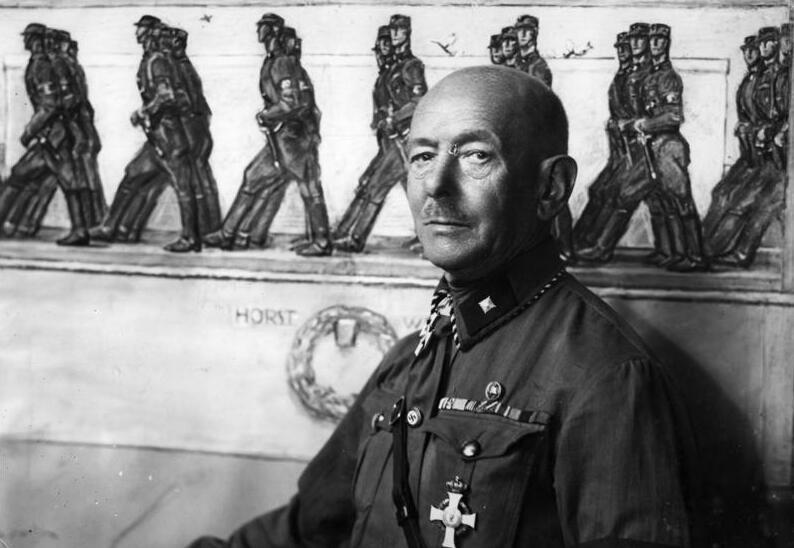
Painter Ludwig Dettmann

- Claus Bergen (1885–1964), marine painter
- Ludwig Dettmann (1865–1944), war painter (member of the Berlin Secession)
- Fritz Mackensen (1866–1953), painter
- Franz Stassen (1869–1949), painter
- Clemens Klotz (1886–1969), architect
- Alfred Mahlau (1894–1967), painter
- Ernst Neufert (1900–1986), architect
- Bruno Paul (1874–1968), architect
- Richard Scheibe (1879–1964), sculptor
- Joseph Wackerle (1880–1959), sculptor

== Special film-list initiated by Goebbels ==
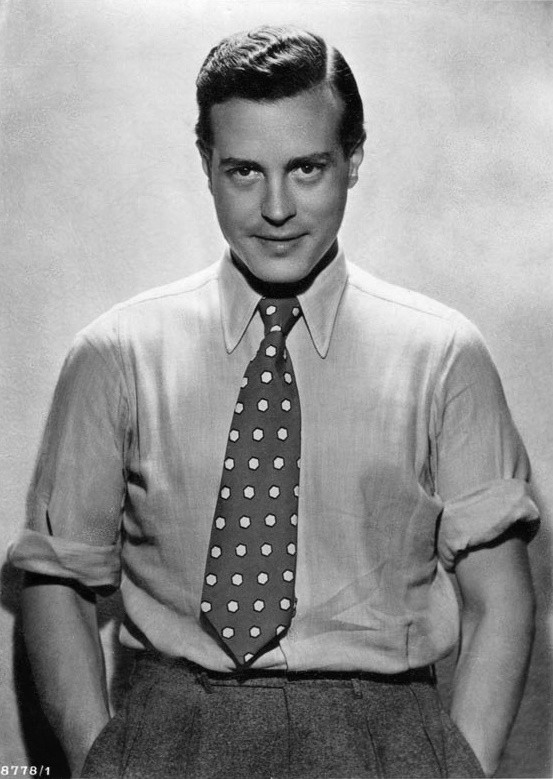
Actor Wolf Albach-Retty

- Wolf Albach-Retty (1908–1967)
- Willy Fritsch (1901–1973)
- Attila Hörbiger (1896–1987)
- Viktor de Kowa (1904–1973)
- Harry Piel (1892–1963)
- Hans Albers (1891–1960)
- Karl Dannemann (1896–1945)
- O. W. Fischer (1915–2004)
- Hans Holt (1909–2001)
- Paul Hörbiger (1894–1981)
- Ferdinand Marian (1902–1946)
- Armin Schweizer (1892–1968)
- Hermann Thimig (1890–1982)

== See also ==
- Reserved occupation
- Reich Cultural Senate
- List of honorary professorships awarded by Adolf Hitler
