= Sebastian Peschko =

German classical pianist (1909–1987)

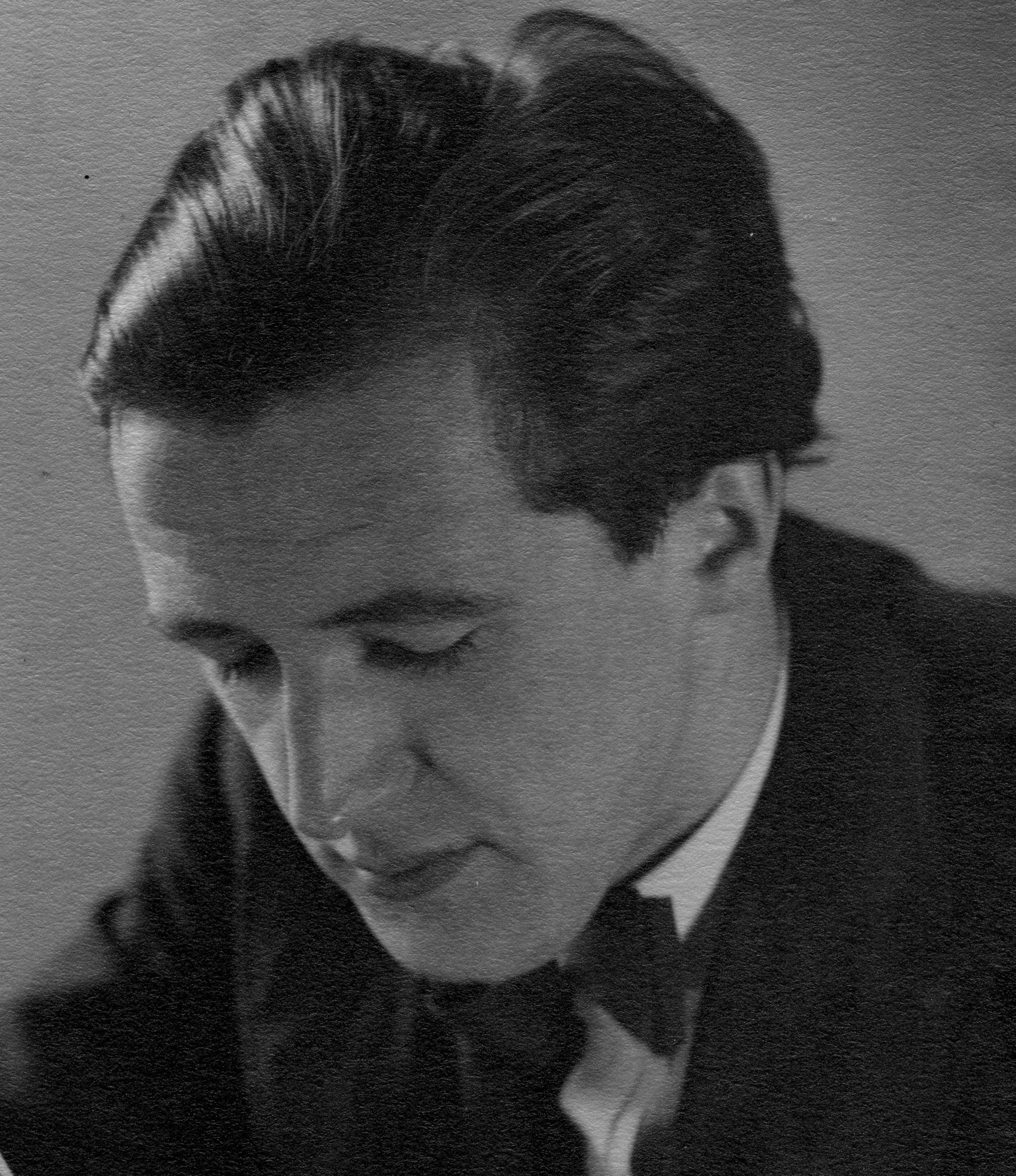
- Born: 30 October 1909; Berlin, German Empire
- Died: 29 September 1987 (aged 77); Celle, West Germany
- Education: Berlin University of the Arts
- Occupation: Classical pianist
- Years active: 1949–1998

Sebastian Peschko (30 October 1909 – 29 September 1987) was a German classical pianist renowned for his skill in performing lieder. He served as an accompanist to some of the most prominent lyrical singers of the 20th century.

== Life and career ==
Peschko was born 30 October 1909 in Berlin, Germany. His father, Paul Peschko, was an organist and private lecturer. Peschko studied at the Hochschule für Musik, now known as the Berlin University of the Arts, from 1927 to 1933. In 1930, he received a Bechstein scholarship. During that period, he studied under pianist Edwin Fischer. Three years later in 1933, Peschko won the Mendelssohn Award. Following this, he played alongside Germany's foremost lyric baritone singer, Heinrich Schlusnus, touring globally from 1934 until 1950.

Peschko was the piano partner of a number of notable singers, including Theo Altmeyer, Erna Berger, Walter Berry, Rudolf Bockelmann, Grace Bumbry, Franz Crass, Lisa Della Casa, Karl Erb, Nicolai Gedda, Agnes Giebel, Ernst Haefliger, Ilse Hollweg, Werner Hollweg, Heinz Hoppe, Christa Ludwig, Maria Müller, Hermann Prey, Ruth-Margret Pütz, Walther Pützstück, Erna Sack, Hanna Schwarz, Franz Völker, Bernd Weikl, and Marcel Wittrisch.

Peschko also played chamber music. Well known examples of these were projects with violinist Georg Kulenkampff, and cellists Enrico Mainardi and Hans Adomeit.

From 1953 to 1958, Peschko was responsible for lieder, choir, and church music at Radio Bremen. In 1958, Rolf Liebermann created a lieder department at Norddeutscher Rundfunk, selecting Peschko because of his knowledge and significant work in lieder music. Peschko went on to work there for multiple decades. In addition to working as a producer, creative artist, and journalist, he also invented the format Meister des Liedes (Masters of lieder).

Peschko performed as tutor for lieder interpretations at the Mozarteum in Salzburg in the early 1970s.

Peschko composed musical arrangements for four poems by Christian Morgenstern, which were performed by singer Helen Donath and pianist Klaus Donath globally.

In 1974, Peschko was awarded the Federal Cross of Merit for his contributions to lieder interpretation and his impactful work as a music producer.

Peschko played an early role in supporting baritone, Thomas Quasthoff.

On 29 September 1987, at the age of 77, Peschko died in Celle, Germany. He had five children: three daughters and two sons, one son having been adopted. Dancer and choreographer Susanne Linke was Peschko's niece.

== Partial discography ==
- 1975: Heinrich Schlusnus sings lieder by Franz Schubert accompanied by Peschko (Teldec)
- 1977: Schlusnus sings lieder by Robert Schumann accompanied by Peschko (Deutsche Grammophon)
- 1994: Lisa Della Casa sings lieder by Richard Strauss accompanied by Peschko (Sbt)
- 1999: Schlusnus sings lieder accompanied by Peschko (Preiser)
- 2002: Erna Berger sings lieder accompanied by Peschko (Orfeo d'Or)
- 2002: Casa, Lieder and Arias, accompanied by Peschko (EMI/Electrola)
- 2004: Grace Bumbry – early recordings, accompanied by Peschko (Deutsche Grammophon)
