= Gottfried Müller (composer) =

German composer and organist (1914–1993)

Joachim Gottfried Müller (born 8 June 1914 in Dresden; died 3 May 1993 in Nuremberg) was a German composer, cantor, and organist.

== Life ==
He was the son of theologian Adolf Müller (de:Adolf Müller).

He studied with Dresden church music director Bernhard Pfannstiehl, and also for a year at the University of Edinburgh with Donald Francis Tovey. In 1932 Karl Straube taught him to play the organ in Leipzig. In the same year, Fritz Busch performed Müller's 90th Psalm for soloists, choir and orchestra. A little later, Müller's variations and fugue on the folk song "Morgenrot" op. 2 were premiered at the International Music Festival in Venice.

With effect from May 1, 1933, Müller joined the NSDAP (membership number 2,458,091). In 1934, his German Heroes' Requiem (op. 4), was premiered by Karl Elmendorff at the 1934 Tonkunstlerfest in Wiesbaden. It was dedicated "into the hands of the Führer", and based on a text by Klaus Niedner. Joseph Goebbels noted it impressed Adolf Hitler. In a biographical note in 1961, the composer instead dedicated it "to the fallen soldiers of the First World War." The work underwent several revivals in the following years. On the occasion of a performance in 1934, his teacher Karl Straube wrote: "In humility and awe it will be obvious to you that you are a gifted person, you have been given the pound of primal musical power". In the same year, Dresden Mayor Ernst Zörner granted him an honorary salary and awarded Müller the City of Dresden Art Prize in 1937 for his op. 4. In 1937, Hitler attended a rehearsal and commanded the work to be performed on May Day. However, a later choral work based on a theme from a speech of Hitler's in 1936, disappointed when performed in 1944.

Müller began military service in 1935, but after the performance of his Morgenrot Variations op. 2 at the annual meeting of the Reich Chamber of Culture in 1936 in the Berlin Philharmonie under Wilhelm Furtwängler, he was exempted from the second year of military service through the intervention of Adolf Hitler. In 1937, the Variations on “Innsbruck, I must leave you” were premiered at the same time under Rudolf Volkmann in Jena and Karl Elmendorff in Mannheim, and in 1939 Müller's Concerto for large orchestra op. 5 was premiered under Karl Elmendorff in Mannheim. Germany stands up! was published in 1940 . Marching song against England, for voice and piano to a text by his brother Christoph Müller. In 1942, Gottfried Müller was granted a state subsidy by the Reich Ministry for Public Enlightenment and Propaganda . From 1942 to 1945 Müller was a lecturer at the Leipzig University of Music. In 1944, Müller's 5-movement symphonic choral work Führerwords op. 7 based on texts by Adolf Hitler was premiered in Dresden under the direction of Elmendorff. In the same year, Gottfried Müller was the youngest of 16 composers to be included in the Gottbegnadeten list.

In 1945, Gottfried Müller took the role of cantor in Glaubitz, near Riesa. In 1951 his motet Tröstet, Tröstiert mein Volk for 7-part mixed choir a cappella was premiered at the Protestant Church Congress in Berlin under Günther Arndt . From 1952 he worked as a church musician in Berlin-Hermsdorf . His music for strings and timpani was premiered in Vienna in 1958 by Heinrich Hollreiser . From 1961 to 1979 Müller was a lecturer in music theory at the Meistersinger Conservatory in Nuremberg. In 1962 Müller's Capriccio for large orchestra was premiered under Heinrich Hollreiser in Mannheim and in 1967 his Symphony after Dürer under the same conductor in Nuremberg. In the 1980s and 90s, the Windsbacher Boys' Choir, under its then director Karl-Friedrich Beringer, performed numerous motets as part of its concert tours at home and abroad. In 1993, Albrecht Mayer recorded Müller's Oboe Quintet with the Bamberg String Quartet on CD and in 1996 Peter Gülke recorded the Concerto for large orchestra op. 5 with the Bamberg Symphony Orchestra, also for a CD. In 2004, Müller's Rufe into the Night, a sequence for trumpet solo, was released on CD in a recording by Ludwig Güttler.

Müller wrote choral and orchestral works (in addition to the above-mentioned mass, the cantata Von den Plagen und vom Licht, Fantasy - Aria - Finale for orchestra and Toccata on BACH for large orchestra), solo concerts, etc. for piano and orchestra, 2 pianos and orchestra, violin and orchestra, oboe and orchestra, piano and chamber music as well as sacred music (organ works, vocal compositions a cappella).

== Selected works ==
90th Psalm for mixed choir and large orchestra (premiere 1932 Dresden) Organ Chorales (1932, premiere 1934 Wiesbaden) Variations and Fugue on a German Folk Song (premiere 1932 Venice) German Hero Requiem for tenor solo, choir and orchestra (premiere 1934 Wiesbaden) Variations on Innsbruck, I have to leave you for small orchestra (premiere 1937 Jena and Mannheim) Concerto for large orchestra (premiere 1939 Mannheim) Canzona in mirror counterpoint for strings (1944, premiere 1965 Nuremberg) Sonata for oboe solo (1948) Now come the Gentile Savior. Organ partita (1949–1950) Comfort, comfort my people. Motet for 7-part choir (premiere 1951 Berlin) Come God Creator Holy Spirit. Organ Partita (1952) Oboe Concerto (1952) Fantasy for flute and orchestra Concertino for three pianos (premiere 1963 Nuremberg) Symphony after Dürer (premiere 1967 Nuremberg) String Quartet in C (premiere 1968 Nuremberg) Fuga apokalyptica (premiere 1971 Nuremberg)

== Bibliography ==
Fred K. Prieberg : Music in the Nazi state . Fischer paperback publisher, Frankfurt a. M., 1982, ISBN 3-596-26901-6, pp. 234–241. Thomas Schinköth: Between Psalm 90 and the words of the leader: The composer Gottfried Müller, in: Dresden and advanced music in the 20th century. Part II: 1933–1966, ed. by Matthias Herrmann and Hanns-Werner Heister, Laaber 2002, pp. 305–310 ( Music in Dresden 5), ISBN 3-89007-510-X
