= Franz Stassen =

German painter (1869–1949)

- Born: 12 February 1869; Hanau, Kingdom of Prussia
- Died: 18 April 1949 (aged 80); Berlin, Allied-occupied Germany
- Known for: Painting, drawing, illustrating
- Movement: Jugendstil, Art Nouveau

Franz Stassen (12 February 1869, Hanau – 18 April 1949, Berlin) was a German painter and illustrator.

== Life ==
Educated at the Berlin University of the Arts, Stassen worked within the German Jugendstil tradition, inspired by artist such as Max Klinger, Gustav Klimt and other symbolist painters. He is best known for illustrating the works of Richard Wagner, particularly Der Ring des Nibelungen and Parsifal. Stassen was a friend of Wagner's son Siegfried and closely associated with the nationalistic Bayreuth Circle, centered around the Bayreuth Festival.

His Wagner illustrations were popular in Wilhelmine Germany and widely reproduced. They have been said to anticipate the heroic American Comic book style. His elaborate incorporation of musical staves and leitmotifs into his illustrations have also been commented upon.

Stassen joined the NSDAP in 1930. He created four tapestries for Hitler's Reich Chancellery, which depicted mythological motifs from the Icelandic Eddas. Important solo exhibitions took place in Bayreuth in 1937 and in Dresden in 1940. In 1939 Hitler awarded him the title of professor. In 1944, towards the end of World War II, he was placed on the Gottbegnadeten list by Joseph Goebbels, a list of artists considered crucial to Nazi culture. Stassen died in Berlin in 1949.

== Works ==
In addition to his Wagnerian works, Stassen created illustrations for The Brothers Grimm's Fairytales, Goethe's Faust and Hans von Wolzogen's Die Edda, Germanische Götter- und Heldensagen among other literary subjects.

== Gallery ==
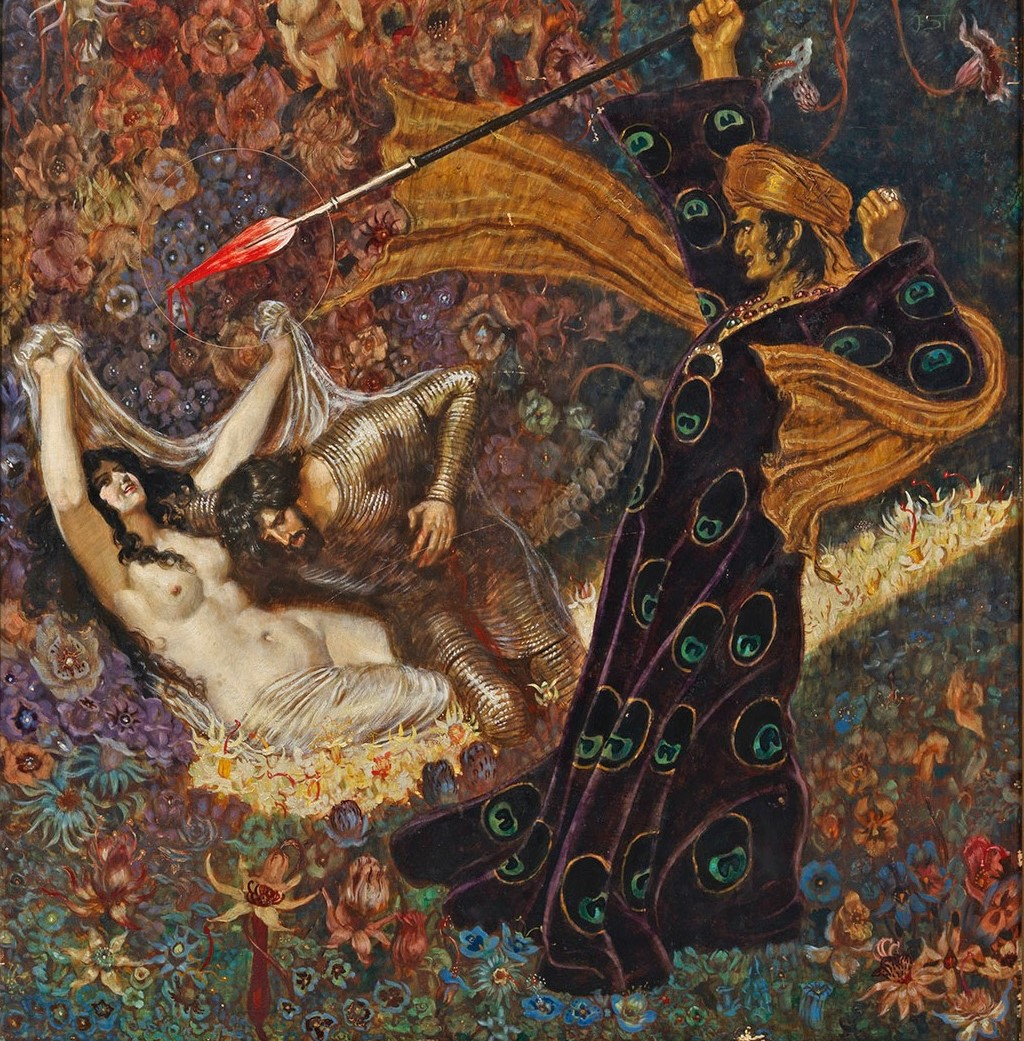
Klingsor's spear

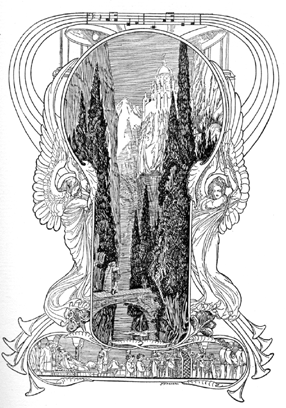
Monsalvat (1903)

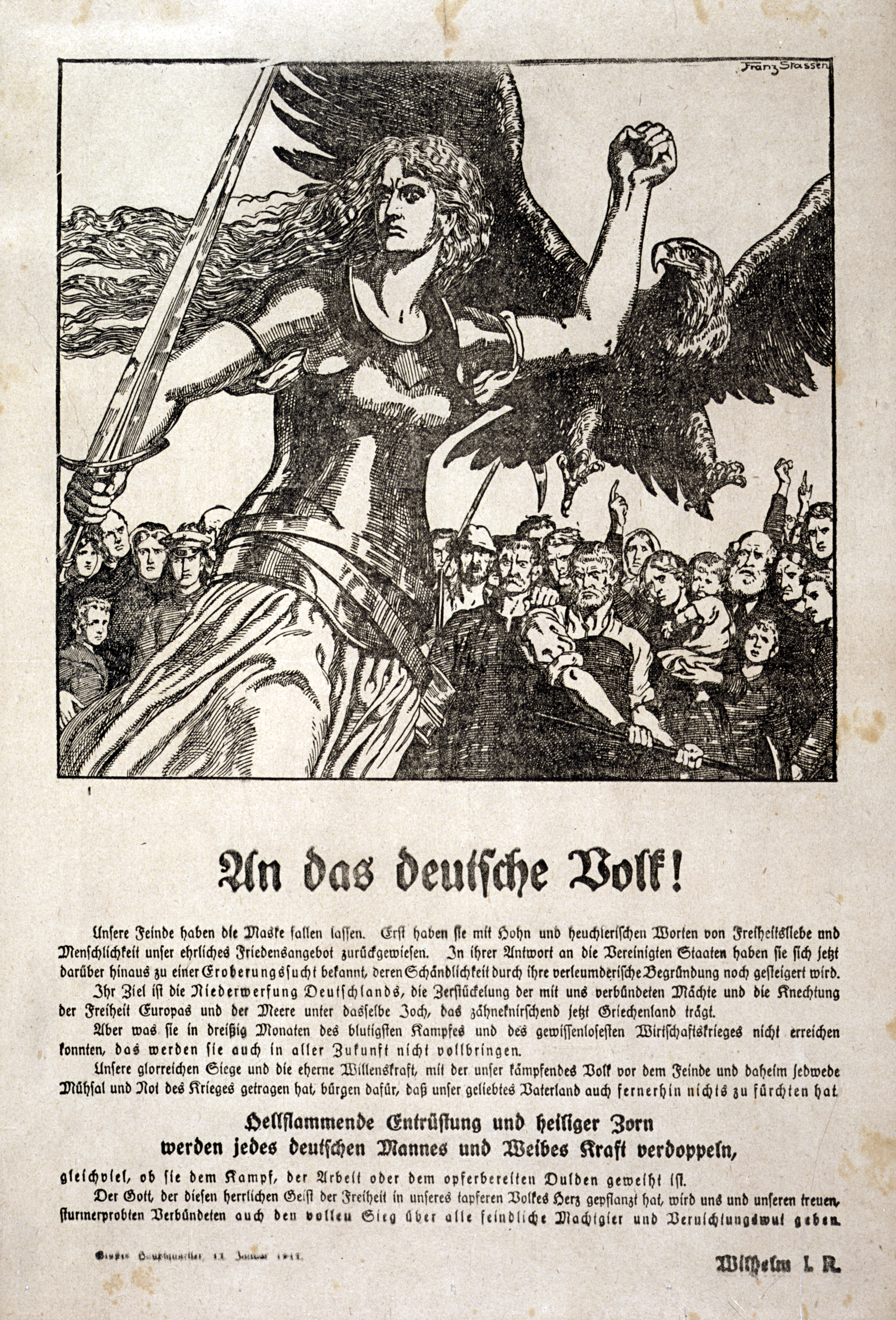
An das deutsche Volk, World War I German propaganda poster, 1917

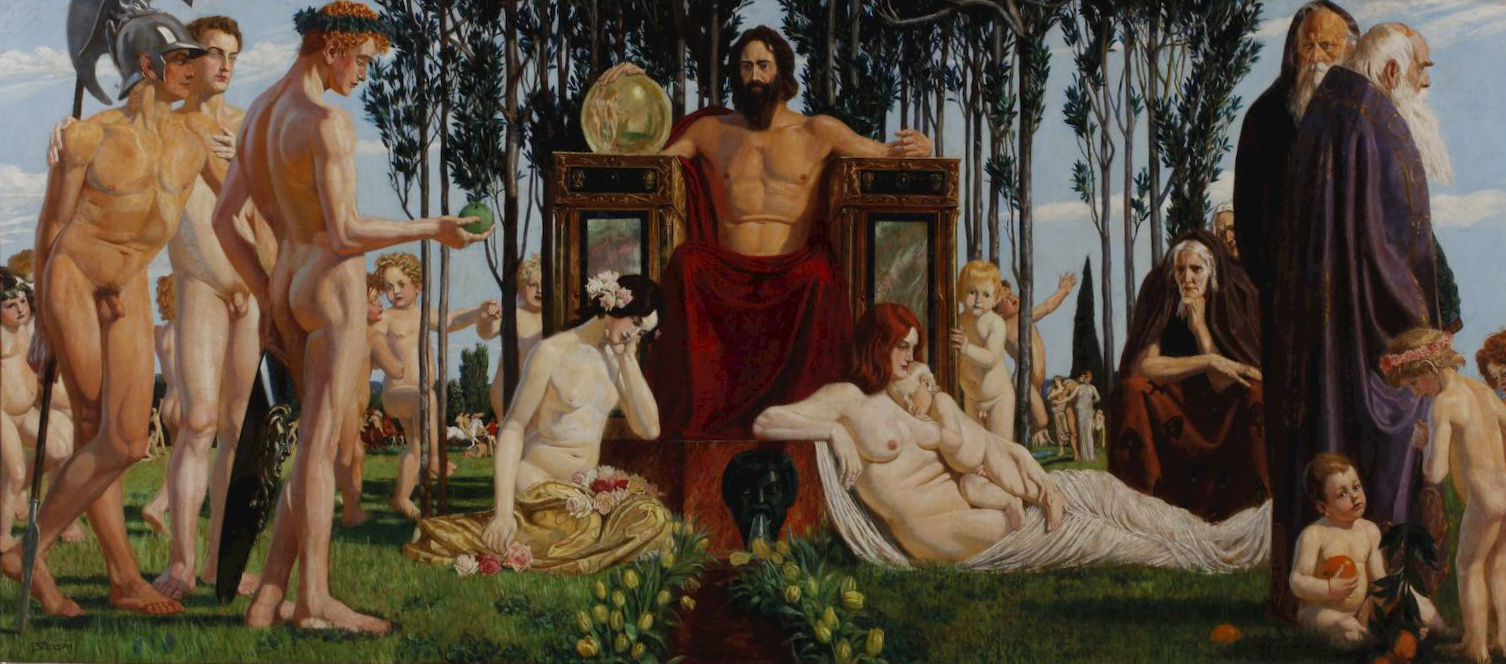
Die Lebensalter, Große Berliner Kunstausstellung, 1905

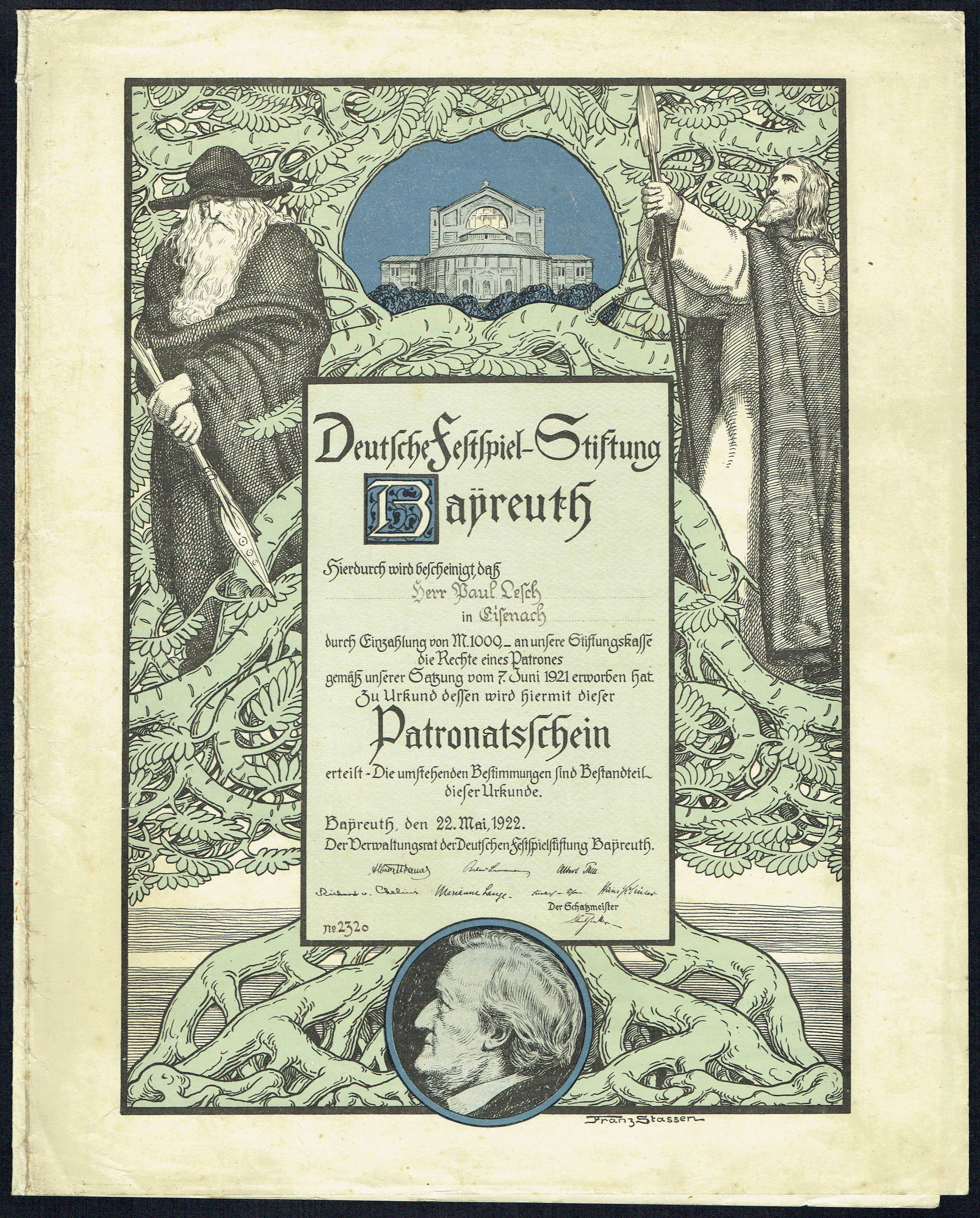
Patronage certificate of the Deutsche Festspiel-Stiftung, 1922

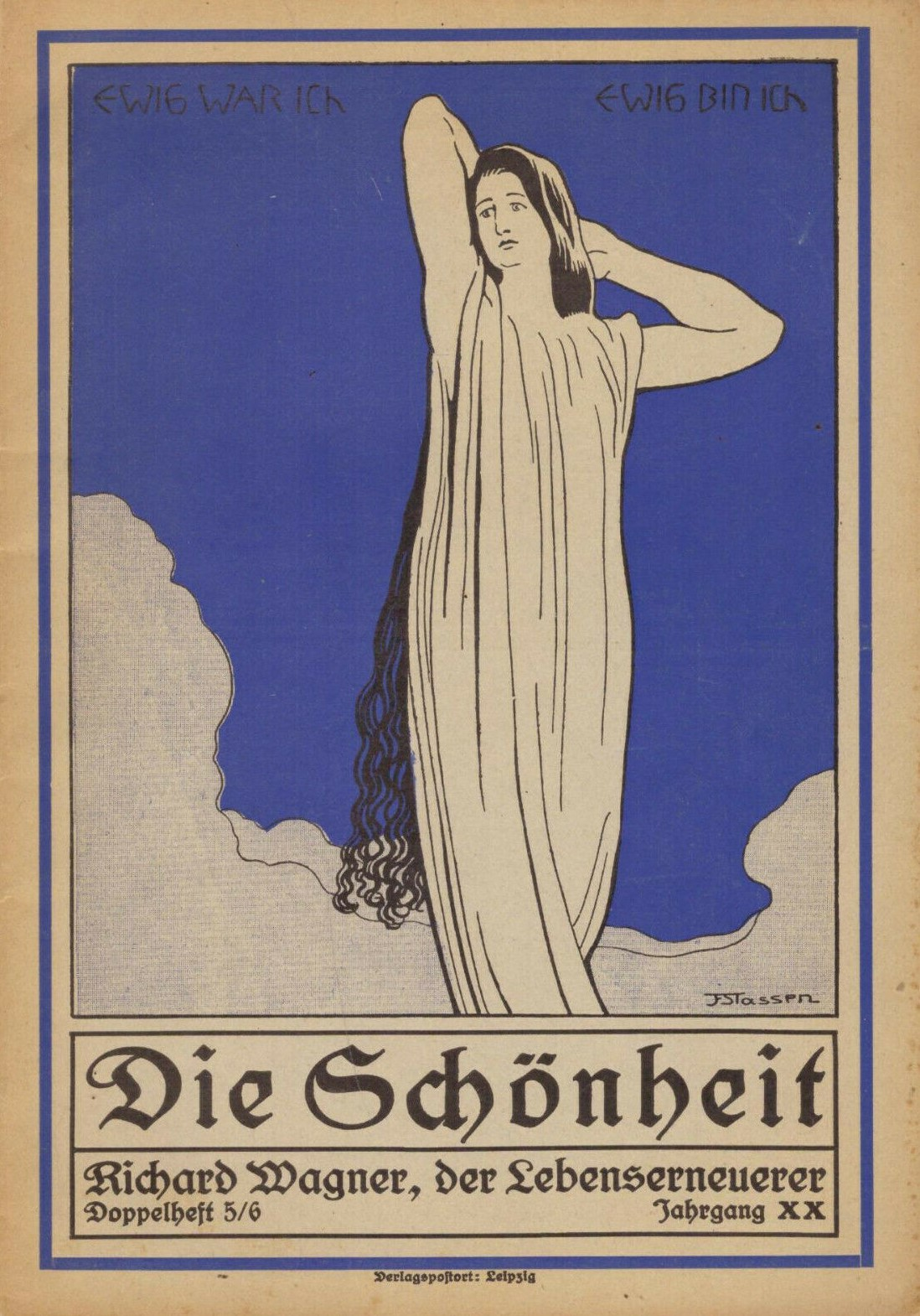
Die Schönheit, 1923

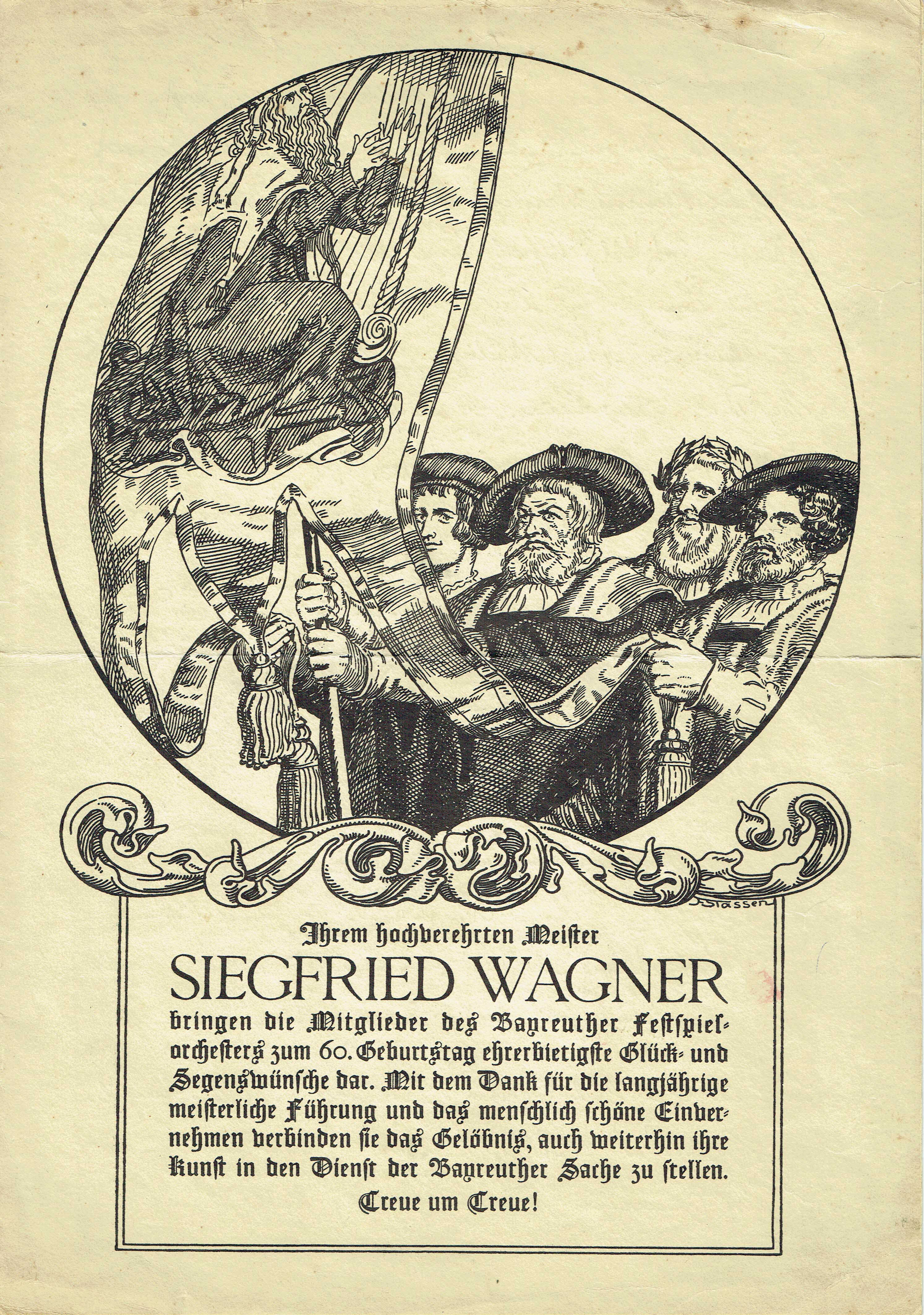
Birthday card from the Bayreuther Festspiel-Orchester from 1929

== Literature ==
- Anton Merk: Franz Stassen, 1869–1949. Maler, Zeichner, Illustrator. Leben und Werk. Museum Hanau Schloss Philippsruhe, 18. April bis 23. Mai 1999.
- Die Schönheit – Franz Stassen-Heft. Heft 1, 17. Jg. (mit Abbildungen von Illustrationen, Gemälden und Exlibris). Dresden 1921, Verlag der Schönheit.
- Franz Stassen. In: Hans Vollmer (Hrsg.): Allgemeines Lexikon der Bildenden Künstler von der Antike bis zur Gegenwart. Begründet von Ulrich Thieme und Felix Becker. Band 31: Siemering–Stephens. E. A. Seemann, Leipzig 1937, S. 488–489.
- Franz Stassen. In: Hans Vollmer (Hrsg.): Allgemeines Lexikon der bildenden Künstler des XX. Jahrhunderts. Band 4: Q–U. E. A. Seemann, Leipzig 1958, S. 345.
