= Riccardo Stracciari =

Italian opera singer

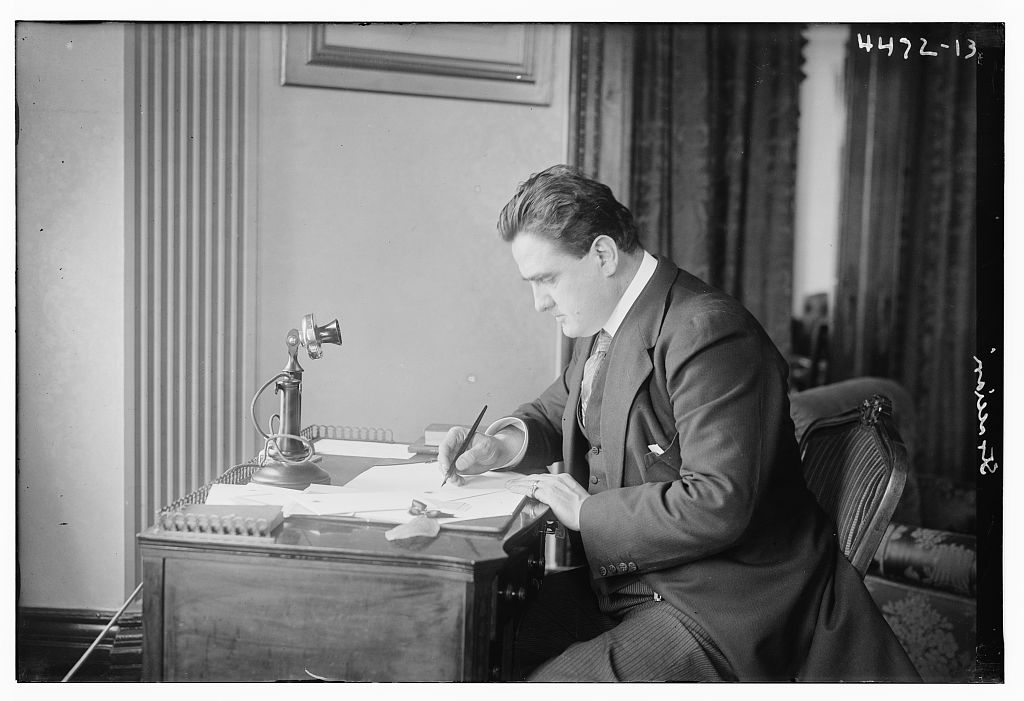
Riccardo Stracciari in 1918

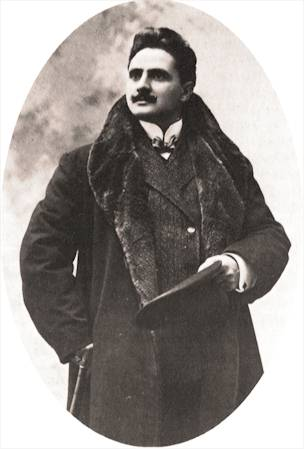
Riccardo Stracciari

Riccardo Stracciari (June 26, 1875 – October 10, 1955) was a leading Italian baritone. His repertoire consisted mainly of Italian operatic works, with Rossini's Figaro and Verdi's Rigoletto becoming his signature roles during a long and distinguished career which stretched from 1899 to 1944.

== Life and career ==
Born in Casalecchio di Reno near Bologna, Italy, Stracciari first sang in an operetta chorus during 1894. He then entered the Bologna Conservatory, undertaking vocal studies with Umberto Masetti. He made his professional debut in 1899, at the Teatro Communale in Bologna, in Pesori's sacred work La risurrezione di Christo. The following year he made his operatic debut as Marcello in Puccini's La bohème in Rovigo. After appearing in various Italian opera houses, he made his debut at Italy's leading operatic venue, La Scala, Milan, in 1904.

Stracciari's career quickly became international, with debuts at the Royal Opera House in London in 1905, followed by his first appearance at the New York Metropolitan Opera on December 1, 1906, as Germont in La traviata with Marcella Sembrich and Enrico Caruso. During his two seasons at the Met, his roles included: Rigoletto, Ashton, Amonasro, Nélusko, Valentin, Marcello, Sharpless, Lescaut, Alfio, Tonio, and Di Luna. He also appeared with the Chicago Opera, the San Francisco Opera, the Paris Opéra, the Teatro Real in Madrid and the Teatro Colón in Buenos Aires.

Stracciari performed widely, too, in his native Italy and retired from the stage in 1944. He is above all associated with Rossini's great comic creation Figaro, in Il barbiere di Siviglia, which he sang an estimated 1000 times, and Rigoletto, in Verdi's tragic opera of the same name. He made complete recordings of these two works in 1929, opposite Mercedes Capsir and Dino Borgioli. Both of these recordings are of particular historical value as illustrations of Italian singing styles of that period.

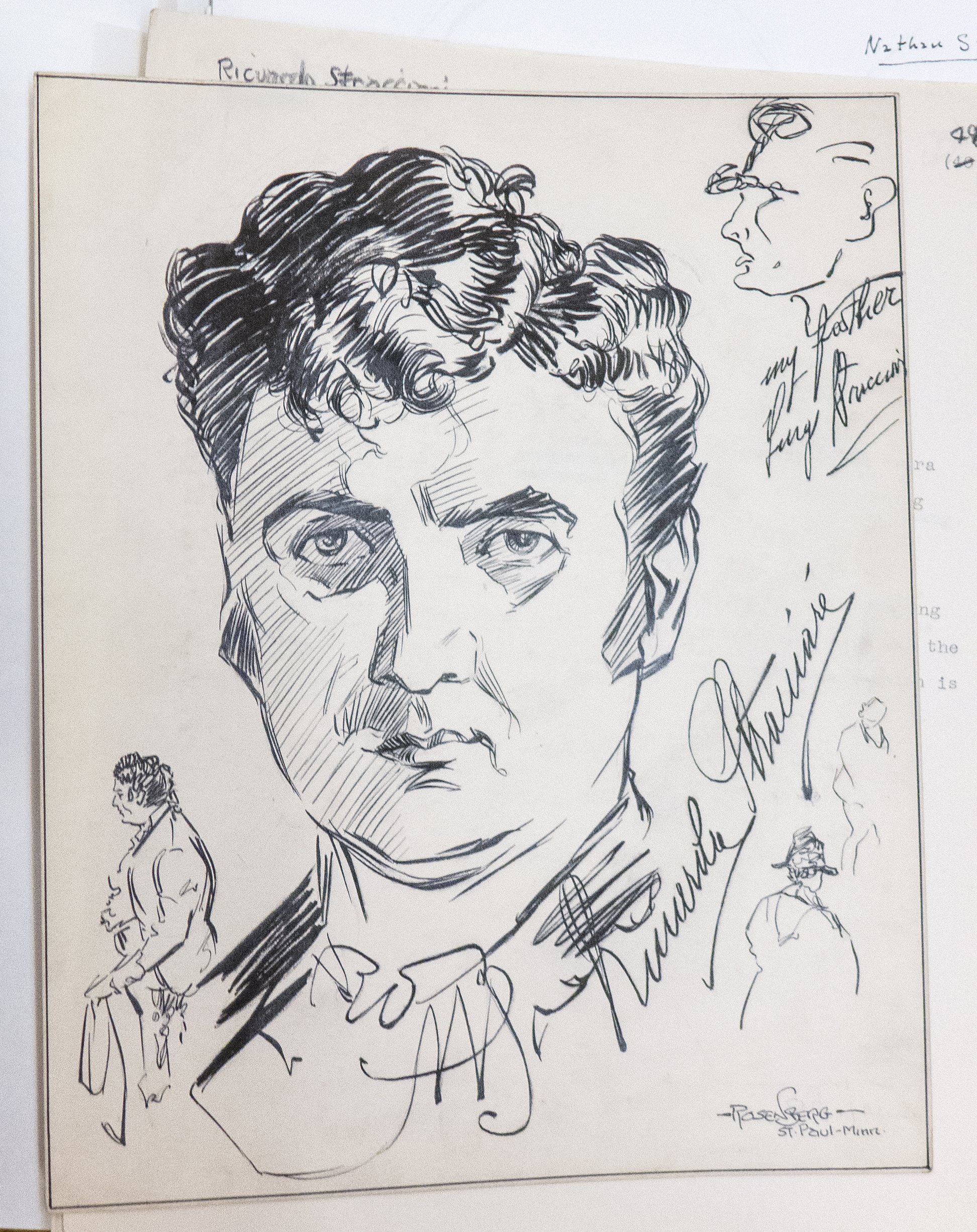
Ricardo Stracciari autographed drawing by Manuel Rosenberg, St. Paul, Mn 1921

Stracciari sang in an era that was rich in outstanding operatic voices. But despite the high quality of the competition which he faced from rival singers, he is still widely considered to have been one of the finest Italian baritones of the 20th century, owing to the beauty of his voice during its peak period, his imposing interpretive style and his first-rate vocal technique. America's foremost soprano of the post World War I-era, Rosa Ponselle, was an enthusiastic admirer of his singing, evaluating his voice as "brilliant and penetrating, alternately dark and light ... like a shower of diamonds."

He also became a distinguished teacher at the music conservatories of Naples and Rome. Among his most notable students were Raffaele Arié, Paolo Silveri, Giulio Fioravanti, Zdeněk Otava, Mario Laurenti, Louis Quilico and Boris Christoff. He died in Rome aged 80.

== Recordings/Discography ==
In addition to the numerous recordings of duets and individual arias which Stracciari made for Fonotipia Records and Columbia Records before, during and after World War One, he participated in the production of two complete Columbia opera recordings which have been reissued, first on LP and then on CD. The respective casts are as follows:

- Verdi, Rigoletto:

Riccardo Stracciari (Rigoletto); Mercedes Capsir (Gilda); Dino Borgioli (Mantua); Ernesto Dominici (Sparafucile); Anna Masetti Bassi (Maddalena); Diulio Baronte (Monterone); Aristide Baracchi (Marullo); Ida Mannarini (Giovanna/Contessa). (La Scala Milan soloists chorus and orchestra.) Conductor: Lorenzo Molajoli; Chorus Master: Vittore Veneziani. (Columbia records, 30 sides, C-GQX 10028-42.)

- Rossini, Il barbiere di Siviglia:

Riccardo Stracciari (Figaro); Mercedes Capsir (Rosina); Dino Borgioli (Almaviva); Vincenzo Bettoni (Basilio); Salvatore Baccaloni (Bartolo); Cesira Ferrari (Berta); Attilio Bordonali (Fiorello); Aristide Baracchi (Ufficiale). (La Scala Milan soloists chorus and orchestra.) Conductor: Lorenzo Molajoli; Chorus Master: Vittore Veneziani. (Columbia Records, 31 sides, D14564-79.)

== Sources ==
- D. Hamilton (ed.),The Metropolitan Opera Encyclopedia: A Complete Guide to the World of Opera (Simon and Schuster, New York 1987). ISBN 0-671-61732-X
- Roland Mancini and Jean-Jacques Rouveroux, (French edition of work by H. Rosenthal and J. Warrack), Guide de l’opéra, Les indispensables de la musique (Fayard, 1995). ISBN 2-213-59567-4
- R. D. Darrell, The Gramophone Shop Encyclopedia of Recorded Music (New York 1936).
- M. Scott, The Record of Singing, Volume 2, (Duckworth, London, 1977)
