= Giovanni Malipiero =

Italian opera singer

Giovanni Malipiero (photo with dedication)

Giovanni Malipiero (20 April 1906 – 10 April 1970) was an operatic tenor who enjoyed a prominent career on stage and on radio in his native Italy during the 1930s and 1940s.

== Career and recorded legacy ==
Malipiero was born in Padua, Italy, where he also studied singing. Lonigo, near Vicenza, was the scene of his professional debut in 1930, as the Duke of Mantua in Verdi's Rigoletto. The following year he sang the same role at the Teatro Ponchielli in Cremona. This performance marked the true start of his career as a leading artist.

The fine quality of Malipiero's lyric voice soon attracted the attention of impresarios, and he was invited to sing at principal venues throughout Italy, including the Teatro Costanzi in Rome, La Fenice in Venice and the Verona Arena. Other major Italian cities that heard him sing were Naples, Parma, Turin and Genoa, and he travelled also to Monaco.

In 1937, he made the first of what would prove to be many appearances at Italy's foremost opera house, the Teatro alla Scala in Milan, as Ramiro in Rossini's La cenerentola. Nine years later, following World War II, he took part in an historic concert held to mark the re-opening of La Scala, performing under the baton of Arturo Toscanini.

Much admired in parts written by the bel canto composers Rossini, Donizetti and Bellini, Malipiero was also acclaimed for his performances in Verdi's La traviata, Falstaff and Rigoletto. Other Italian operas in which he sang with considerable successes included Puccini's La bohème, Manon Lescaut and Gianni Schicchi, and Boito's Mefistofele. He did not ignore French music, either. During the 1930s and 1940s he appeared, for instance, in Offenbach's Les Contes d'Hoffmann, Gounod's Faust, and Massenet's Werther and Le jongleur de Notre-Dame.

The political turmoil of the late 1930s, culminating in the outbreak of the six-year-long Second World War, restricted Malipiero's opportunities to establish an international career. He was said to have disliked overseas travel, too, although he did accept engagements to sing in South America. His schedule of performances wound down in the 1950s and he began to assume character parts from the middle of that decade onwards. He retired in 1962 after a final appearance at the Teatro San Carlo, Naples.

Malipiero possessed a clear, bright, well-trained voice with a slightly husky timbre. Italian music critics and audiences of the 1930-1960 period praised his singing style, regarding it as belonging to the elegant 'old school' of pre-verismo vocalism.

He can be heard as Edgardo in a complete recording of Donizetti's Lucia di Lammermoor, with the coloratura soprano Lina Pagliughi in the title role and Ugo Tansini conducting, that was made by Cetra Records at the height of the tenor's powers in 1939. This performance was remastered in 2001 and released on CD by Naxos Records. In 2009, the Preiser label issued a CD devoted to Malipiero. It contains a selection of arias, ranging in compositional date from the bel canto era through to the verismo period, that he recorded in Italy between 1937 and 1941.

Malipiero died 10 days short of his 64th birthday, in Padua.

== Sources ==
- Grove Music Online, J.B. Steane, Oxford University Press, April 2008.
