= Cetra Records =

Italian record company

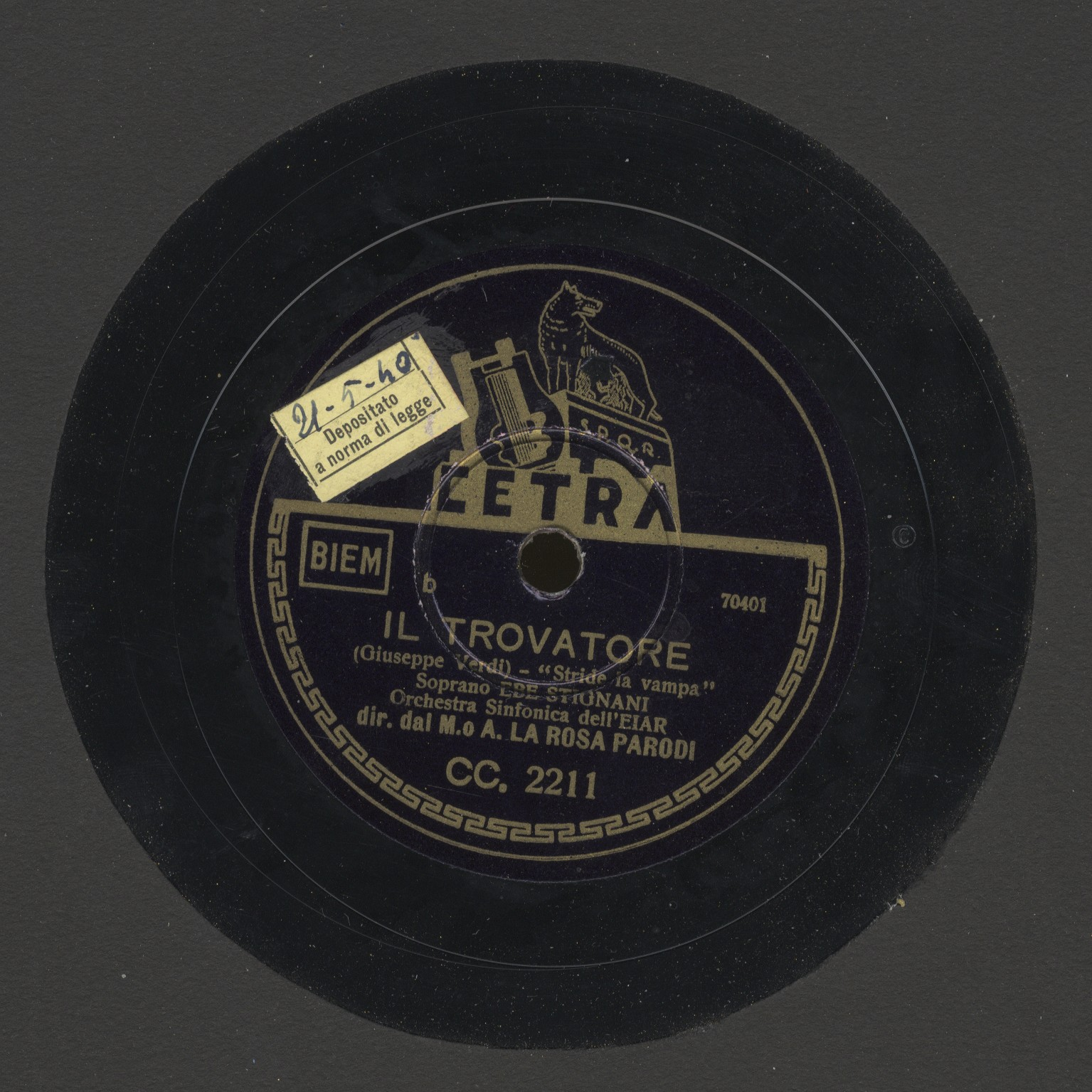
Image of a 78rpm of an aria from Giuseppe Verdi's Il trovatore, recorded by Cetra

Cetra (Compagnia per edizioni, teatro, registrazioni ed affini) was an Italian record company, active between 1933 and 1957, the year in which, by merging with Fonit (Fonodisco Italiano Trevisan), it gave birth to Fonit Cetra. Its roster of artists included Maria Callas, Renata Tebaldi, Lina Pagliughi, Ebe Stignani, Carlo Bergonzi, Galliano Masini, Giovanni Malipiero, Ferruccio Tagliavini, Carlo Tagliabue, Rolando Panerai, Italo Tajo, Giuseppe Taddei, Tancredi Pasero and Cesare Siepi, among other leading Italian opera singers.

Cetra was notable for issuing many recordings of obscure or rarely performed operas and the more obscure operas of Giuseppe Verdi to coincide with the 50th anniversary of the composer's 1901 death in 1951. Cetra recordings are often now reissued by the company Fonit Cetra. Cetra opera albums were first distributed in the United States on the Cetra-Soria label (founded by Dario and Dorle Soria, who later founded Angel Records). In 1966, Everest Records began distribution of several Cetra opera recordings in the United States.

Cetra also produced popular music recordings from at least the World War II years through the 1960s. One of their instrumental artists is accordionist Michele Corino, a soloist with Italy's prominent Angelini Orchestrauntil he moved to San Francisco (California), in 1948. "Mike" ran a prominent accordion studio in "North Beach Music" (a.k.a. Corino Music) and taught, worked and recorded with brothers Fabio and Gianfranco Giotta, part of the San Francisco-based Caffé Trieste (see also "Cavalier Records", "Caffé Trieste" and "Trieste Records"). Gianfranco shared the studio with Mike on the 1963 Cetra album titled "Rome to Paris".

== History of the Cetra ==
C.e.t.r.a. (the name is the acronym of Compagnia per edizioni, teatro, registrazioni ed affini) was born in Turin on April 10, 1933, on the initiative of the Italian Agency for Radio Auditions (EIAR), which decides to transform the Edizioni musicali Radiofono, active since 15 September 1923 (and owned by him) in the record company, changing its name to Cetra Società Anonima; later the company will become a joint stock company.

Initially, the Cetra only made its own recordings and the distribution of the discs, for the printing of which it used instead of the Parlophon as easily found on the labels.

In a short time, also starting the printing of its own records and with its own machinery, it became one of the leading companies in the Italian discography (at the time only 78 rpm records were printed), thanks above all to the link with the radio company EIAR, that all the major singers broadcast by the radio then recorded for the Cetra.

After the war it continues to have a prominent position on the market, thanks to artists such as Nilla Pizzi, Achille Togliani, Claudio Villa (since 1957), and to the work of its general manager, Edgardo Trinelli.

La Cetra also distributed some small satellite labels, such as Fon and Mayor.

With an act dated December 16, 1957, Fonit and Cetra decided to merge into a new company, Fonit Cetra; the Cetra brand continues to exist within the new company.

== Bibliography ==
- Various authors (edited by Gino Castaldo), Dictionary of Italian song, Curcio editions, 1990; under the entry Fonit Cetra, by Mario De Luigi, pp. 695–696.
- The data concerning the house's record releases were taken from the phonographic supports issued and stored (like all those published in Italy) at the State Discotheque in Rome.
- Various issues of the magazines Musica e dischi (years from 1948 onwards), TV Sorrisi e Canzoni (years from 1954), and many other musical magazines.
- Mario De Luigi, The record industry in Italy, Lato Side editions, Rome, 1982.
- Mario De Luigi, History of the phonographic industry in Italy, Musica e Dischi editions, Milan, 2008.
