= Wilhelm Strienz =

German singer and opera singer

Wilhelm Strienz (2 September 1900 – 10 May 1987) was a German bass operatic singer.

Strienz was born in Stuttgart in 1910, and made his debut in 1922 at the Deutsche Oper Berlin as the hermit in Weber's Der Freischütz. In subsequent years, he performed at the opera houses of Wiesbaden, Kaiserslautern and Stuttgart. His roles included Mephistopheles in Gounod's Faust, van Bett in Lortzing's Zar und Zimmermann, and numerous Wagnerian roles.

Between 1926 and 1933, Strienz worked for the newly founded Westdeutscher Rundfunk in Cologne. After the seizure of power in Germany by the Nazis in 1933, broadcasting director Ernst Hardt was dismissed but Strienz joined the S.A. and was engaged by the Berlin State Opera. In 1935, he recorded Deutsch sein heißt treu sein! (To be German is to be loyal) and Flieg', Deutsche Fahne Flieg'! (Fly, German flag) on the Electrola label, and subsequently became a popular performer on radio best known by the nickname Willi Strienz. In 1936, he sang in the Nationalsozialistische Kulturgemeinde-produced film Ewiger Wald (Eternal Forest). He continued to fulfill operatic engagements and guested at the Royal Opera House, Covent Garden. in London. In 1937 and 1938, he sang Sarastro in the first complete recording of Mozart's opera Die Zauberflöte (The Magic Flute) with the Berlin Philharmonic under Sir Thomas Beecham, and in 1943 Falstaff in the first complete recording of Nicolai's opera Die lustigen Weiber von Windsor (The Merry Wives of Windsor) under Artur Rother, also in Berlin, both of these major German roles with overpowering magnificence and grandeur of voice and interpretation. He was also known for his renditions of the ballads Der Nöck (The Water Sprite) by August Kopisch and Die Uhr (The Clock) by Johann Gabriel Seidl, both set to music by Carl Loewe.

Because of his great popularity, the Nazi regime called on him after the start of World War II to sing on the popular radio music show Wunschkonzert für die Wehrmacht (Request Concert for the Armed Forces), where he was particularly renowned for his rendition of Gute Nacht, Mutter (Good Night, Mother) by Werner Bochmann. From 1940, he recorded various other war songs as a soloist. He also appeared in the propaganda films Wunschkonzert (1940) and Fronttheater (1942). In the final phase of the Second World War, Adolf Hitler included Strienz in the Gottbegnadeten list (list of those graced by God) as one of nine major concert singers in August 1944, exempting him from military service during the final stages of the war.

In the immediate post-war period, German broadcasters, especially in the Soviet occupation zone, boycotted Strienz since his name was associated with Nazi propaganda of the war years. He continued his singing career nonetheless, making successful tours and receiving a record contract from Decca. He ended his singing career in 1963 and retired into private life. Strienz died in Frankfurt am Main in 1987.
