= Giulio Fioravanti =

Italian opera singer (1923–1999)

- Giulio Fioravanti (photo with 1951 dedication)
- Born: 17 October 1923; Ascoli Piceno
- Died: 3 May 1999 (aged 75); Milan
- Occupation: opera singer

Giulio Fioravanti (17 October 1923, Ascoli Piceno – 3 May 1999, Milan) was an Italian operatic baritone, particularly associated with the Italian repertory.

He studied first jurisprudence and work one year as a jurist in his native city before turning to music studies at the Accademia di Santa Cecilia in Rome, with famed baritone Riccardo Stracciari. He made his stage debut in Turin, as Germont in La traviata, in 1951. He sang throughout Italy and in 1957 made his debut at both the San Carlo in Naples and La Scala in Milan.

He established himself in the standard Italian repertory, singing all the great baritone parts from bel canto to verismo. He also took part in several creations of contemporary works such as Rappresentazione e Festa by Gian Francesco Malipiero, Alamistakeo by Giulio Viozzi, Vivì by Franco Mannino, Suocera Rapita by Lidia Ivanova, and La regina delle nevi by Giuseppe Zanaboni. From 1991 he dedicated himself to teaching, activity that he carried out with passion until his death in 1999.

Fioravanti did not record prolifically commercially. He can be heard in Manon Lescaut, opposite Maria Callas, La fille du régiment, opposite Anna Moffo, and Adriana Lecouvreur, opposite Renata Tebaldi. He appeared as Scarpia in a TV production of Tosca, opposite Magda Olivero, and Enrico in a film version of Lucia di Lammermoor, opposite Anna Moffo, both recently released on DVD. There are also a number of live (sound) recordings including Edipo Re in Leoncavallo's eponymous opera, recorded in 1972.
