= Fried Walter =

German composer and conductor (1907–1996)

Fried Walter (9 December 1907 in Ottendorf-Okrilla as Walter Emil Schmidt, 8 April 1996 in Berlin) was a German composer. He composed over 500 pieces and arranged more than 250 songs, including many Volkslieder, and he is considered one of the most versatile and prolific composers of German light music.

== Life ==
Fried Walter was born as the son of an elementary school teacher near Dresden. His mother died when Walter was only 5 years old. Although his father encouraged him to also become a teacher, Walter focused his studies on musical instruments, including piano, cello, organ, and French horn. At the age of 17, he was accepted as a student for music theory and conducting at the Semperoper opera house in Dresden. He earned his first paycheck as a horn player playing Richard Wagner operas as an ensemble musician. After completing his education, he volunteered for the state theater in Gotha, after which he moved to the Reußisch-Fürstliche Theater in Gera. The Great Depression forced him to give up his position.

Walter moved to Berlin, where he studied the techniques of silent film accompaniment from Giuseppe Becce; however, with the advent of sound film, his career as silent film accompanist never came to fruition. Walter applied to the Prussian Academy of Arts, where he received a scholarship to study under Arnold Schoenberg. Although he rehearsed two of Schoenberg's operas in the Kroll Opera House, Walter categorically rejected dodecaphony.

After his training under Schoenberg, Walter worked as musician in German kabarett, variety shows, and circus. He also was an accompanist for various vocal ensembles, including the Humoresk Melodios and Comedian Harmonists. In 1933, Walter married the Dutch cabaret performer Elisabeth Stuy. When the National Socialists came to power, Walter avoided all contact with the party and military, which helped him receive a position as a freelancer for the Rundfunksender Leipzig radio station. During his time as a freelancer, he took lessons under Hermann Ambrosius at the Leipzig Conservatory. He lived in the Netherlands for a short period of time with his wife, where he was unable to find work as an expatriate from Germany. In 1938, he composed the opera Königin Elisabeth (Queen Elizabeth), which one year later was performed at the Royal Swedish Opera in Stockholm with the attendance of the King of Sweden Gustav V. After the great success of his opera, the conductor Heinz Tietjen commissioned Walter to compose a new stage work, which also ensured that Walter would not be drafted into the German military. The opera Andreas Wolfius premiered at the Berlin State Opera in 1940. In 1943, Walter went to Prague and directed his ballet Kleopatra (Cleopatra). Walter Fried's success as a composer led to his name being compiled in Adolf Hitler's infamous August 1944 Gottbegnadeten list, which venerated artists important to the Nazi party.

Despite his veneration by the Nazi Party, Walter was not classified as a Belastete (offender) by the Allied forces during denazification at the end of World War II, so he was able to receive a post at the Berlin State Opera as a répétiteur and concert pianist. There he premiered his ballet Der Pfeil (The Arrow). In 1947, he was hired at the broadcasting station RIAS, which was established by the allied forces. He worked there for 25 years as a music director, conductor, and arranger of musical pieces. There he met his second wife Edith. His recordings with the RIAS radio orchestra include classics such as the operetta Zigeunerliebe (Gypsy Love) and the ballet Swan Lake, and many young composers premiering their works through the German broadcaster ARD recorded with his orchestra. In addition, Walter performed throughout West Germany and Austria. His last opera Die fünf Bräute (The Five Brides) premiered in 1998 under the direction of Claus Martin, with musical direction by Franns Wilfried Promnitz.

After the reunification of Germany, Walter's hometown of Ottendorf-Okrilla honored him as an exemplary citizen, and after his death in 1996, the town commemorated a street in his honor. He is buried in the Friedhof Dahlem cemetery in Berlin.

== Selected compositions ==
- Marionetten und Masken, 1935
- Die Tageszeiten, 1937
- Hymnus, 1937
- Tanz-Suite für Bratsche und kleines Orchester, 1937
- Die wilden Schwäne, 1937
- Lustspiel-Ouvertüre, 1941
- Ballett-Szene, 1942
- Bergsommer, 1947
- Der Paradiesvogel, 1953
- Bremer Capriccio, 1953
- Ballettszenen, 1953
- Heidebilder, 1953
- Karawane, 1953
- Märchen und Tanzszene, 1958
- „Frühlings-Sonnenschein“, Koloratur-Walzer, 1958
- Polonaise, 1958
- Marokkanisches Tagebuch, 1958
- Rhapsodie Nr. 1, 1960
- Klavierkonzert, 1961
- Rhapsodie Nr. 2, 1963
- Impressionen aus meinem Garten, 1964
- Ferien im Tessin, 1967
- Spanische Ouvertüre, 1972
