= Heinrich Schlusnus =

German baritone (1888–1952)

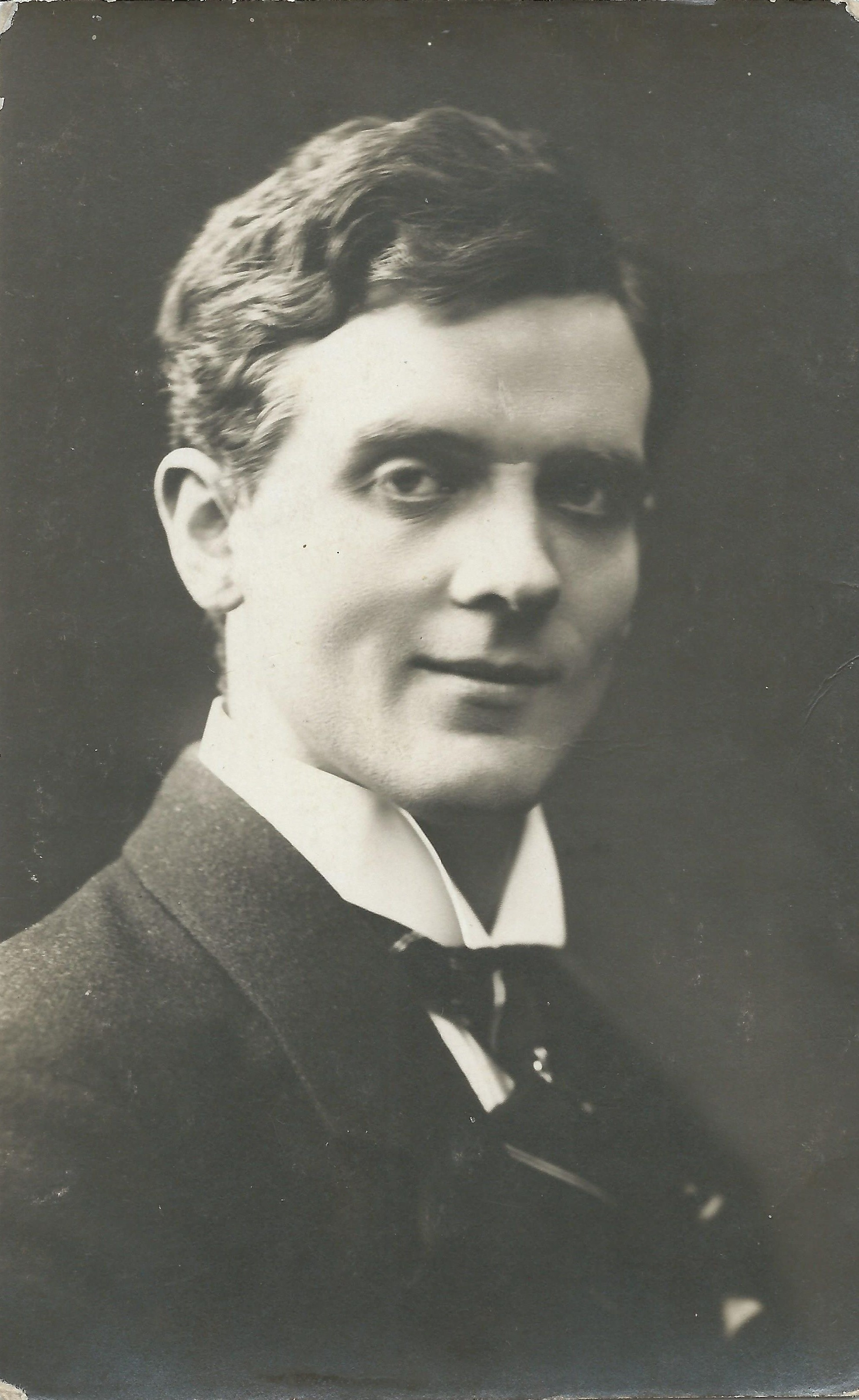
- Portrait of Schlusnus
- Born: 6 August 1888; Braubach, German Empire
- Died: 18 June 1952 (aged 63); Frankfurt, West Germany
- Occupation: Baritone

Signature
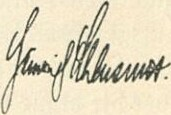

Heinrich Schlusnus (6 August 1888 – 18 June 1952) was Germany's foremost lyric baritone of the interwar period. He sang opera and lieder with equal distinction.

== Career ==
A native of Braubach, Schlusnus studied with voice teachers in Berlin and Frankfurt before making his debut at Hamburg's opera house in 1915. During World War I, he had fought and been severely wounded. Schlusnus sang at Nuremberg from 1915 to 1917 and at the prestigious Berlin State Opera from 1917 until 1951. He was engaged by the Chicago Opera for its 1927–28 season and appeared at the Bayreuth Festival in 1933.

In 1919, an event of fundamental importance occurred. Schlusnus was already a successful singer, and yet he started again from scratch under the tutelage of Louis Bachner. During his earlier studies, it was fashionable to "cover" the voice, making it throaty, dark, and limited. Under Bachner, Schlusnus liberated his timbre and expanded his range. He sang simply as one speaks, naturally and distinctly. Louis Bachner: "with yield, not with capital." Schlusnus: "[He] has given me freedom of voice, my vocal technique, and an understanding of proper singing. What I am, is thanks to him."

Schlusnus was considered Germany's greatest performer of Verdi's baritone roles. Schlusnus excelled in the lighter Wagnerian parts and in operatic works by other German composers.

Furthermore, Schlusnus earned critical renown as a concert artist and lieder singer despite facing stiff competition on the recital platform (and the operatic stage) from such outstanding rival baritones as Herbert Janssen, Willi Domgraf-Fassbaender, Gerhard Hüsch, Karl Hammes, Rudolf Bockelmann and Karl Schmitt-Walter. As an interpreter of lieder, he often performed with the German pianists Franz Rupp and Sebastian Peschko.

=== National Socialist activities ===
In 1924 Schlusnus formed a successful partnership with Franz Rupp that helped establish Rupp as one of the leading chamber musicians in Germany. Rupp was an outspoken critic of Hitler and struggled after Hitler's rise to power in 1933. This led to a rupture in his relationship with Schlusnus, who had joined the Nazi Party in 1934. After arguing with Rupp, Schlusnus sent him one of many letters saying that he could no longer work with an "enemy of the state". Shortly after Rupp's farewell letter, Schlusnus denounced him to the Reich Chamber of Culture; Rupp only escaped being sent to a labour camp after an adjutant of Goebbels' interceded on his behalf.

=== Later life ===
By all accounts, Schlusnus was not a magnetic actor like two famous fellow Verdi baritones of subsequent generations: Lawrence Tibbett and Tito Gobbi. By way of compensation, however, he had an exceedingly beautiful high baritone voice and an impeccable legato style of singing to go with it. Indeed, Schlusnus' polished bel canto technique, coupled with the prudent management of his vocal resources, enabled him to enjoy an unusually long career. He died in Frankfurt, not long after retiring from the stage, at the age of 63.

== Recordings ==
Schlusnus frequented German recording studios during the 1920s, '30s and '40s—committing to disc an impressive array of lieder and a panoply of standard German and Italian operatic arias and duets. Many of these recordings are available on CD, notably a complete Rigoletto sung in German opposite Erna Berger, Helge Rosvaenge, Margarete Klose and Josef Greindl. He was also heard often on German radio broadcasts made prior to, and during, World War II. The English music critic, J.B. Steane, writes highly of the baritone's legacy of recordings in his survey of classical singing on disc, "The Grand Tradition". Steane praises him for the fine-grained beauty of his tone, his musicality, and the smoothness of his legato.
