= Luigi Piazza =

Italian opera singer

Luigi Piazza (1884 – 22 March 1967) was an Italian operatic baritone, particularly associated with the Italian repertory, especially the role of Rigoletto.

Piazza was born in Bologna, where he studied at the Bologna Conservatory with Alberoni. He made his stage debut there in 1908, as Enrico in Lucia di Lammermoor.

His main career spanned from 1910 until 1930, during which time he sang at most of the major opera houses in Italy, with the "Teatro Communale" in Bologna remaining his anchor. Outside Italy, he appeared in France and Spain, and in 1916 at the Teatro Colón in Buenos Aires. In 1924, he went on a guest tour of Australia. Although he was invited twice to sing at the Metropolitan Opera, he never appeared there. He retired from the stage in 1935, and died in his native city of Bologna over thirty years later.

While active, he was appreciated as a fine "provincial" baritone. He achieved a degree of international fame through his only recording, a complete Rigoletto from 1927, opposite Lina Pagliughi, Tino Folgar and Salvatore Baccaloni, which reveals a voice of considerable beauty and power, backed by a strong theatrical sense.

== Sources ==
- Operissimo.com, "Piazza, Luigi"
