= Isola Jones =

Mezzo-soprano opera singer

Isola Jones (born December 27, 1949) is an American mezzo-soprano opera singer. She sang at the Metropolitan Opera for 16 seasons and has performed with many opera companies throughout the U.S. and abroad.

== Biography ==
Jones was born in Chicago, Illinois. She is part African American and part Cherokee, and also has European ancestry. She received her undergraduate degree at Northwestern University in Evanston, Illinois. Among her musical influences, she credits Leontyne Price.

After college, she joined the Chicago Symphony Chorus and was the understudy for Yvonne Minton the Verdi Requiem in 1975. During the next two years, she sang in Der Fliegende Holländer in Chicago and in Porgy and Bess in Cleveland. She joined the Metropolitan Opera in 1977, first playing Olga in Tchaikovsky's Eugene Onegin. She sang at the Met for 16 seasons and more than 500 performances. In her first year at the Met, she sang the role of Maddalena in Rigoletto in a live telecast, and she later sang in 10 Live from the Met telecasts.

She has also sung with Arizona Opera, Baltimore Opera, Calgary Opera, Chicago Lyric Opera, Cincinnati Opera, Dallas Opera, the Hungarian Opera Company, Palm Beach Opera, Seattle Opera, at the Spoleto Festival and at Kennedy Center with Washington Opera. In 1999, she joined the faculty at South Mountain Community College in Phoenix, Arizona. The title role in the opera, Guadalupe, Our Lady of the Roses, was written for Jones, who wrote one of the arias. The opera was composed by James DeMars of Arizona State University, and its recording was nominated in four categories for the 2010 Grammy Awards.

She continues to perform and teach.

Ms. Jones has recently completed her coursework at Arizona State University and is now Dr. Isola Jones.
