= Lina Pagliughi =

American opera singer

- Lina Pagliughi as Gilda in Rigoletto, Teatro alla Scala, Milan, 1939-1940 (photo with 1943 dedication)
- Occupation: opera soprano singer

Lina Pagliughi (27 May 1907 – 2 October 1980) was an Italian-American opera singer. Based in Italy for the majority of her career, she made a number of recordings and established herself as one of the world's finest lyric coloratura sopranos of the 1930s and 1940s.

== Career ==
Pagliughi was born in Brooklyn, New York, to Italian immigrants. Her parents took her to live in San Francisco when still a child and she displayed a love of singing at an early age. She was noticed by the legendary soprano Luisa Tetrazzini who sensed her potential and encouraged her to study toward an operatic career.

At the age of 15, Pagliughi moved to Italy with her family and she took voice lessons from the conductor/pedagogue Gaetano Bavagnoli in Milan. She made her debut in 1927, at Milan's Teatro Communale, as Gilda in Rigoletto. Her success was such that she was immediately engaged to sing the part in a complete recording of the opera, with the baritone Luigi Piazza and the tenor Tino Folgar performing the leading male roles. She also provided the singing voice of the titular character in the original Italian dub of Disney's Snow White and the Seven Dwarfs in 1938.

Pagliughi's fame spread throughout Italy and she was invited to sing at all the major opera centres, including Turin, Parma, Venice, Florence, Rome and Naples. Critics acclaimed her as the successor of Toti dal Monte (1893–1975) in the Rossini-Donizetti-Bellini repertory, in which her sweetly limpid voice, agile technique and expressive phrasing were shown to best effect. However, apart from a successful tour of Australia in 1932 and a few performances that she gave in Monte Carlo and London during the same decade, she hardly ever sang outside Italy.

She became extremely stout as she grew older, which limited her capacity to be convincing in 'girlish' roles, no matter how well she sang them, and she quit the stage in 1947; but she continued to be heard on Italian radio RAI until 1956, when she retired for good and turned to teaching with students such as the Swedish soprano Hjördis Schymberg.

During her prime, Pagliughi recorded her interpretations of showpiece operatic arias. She also recorded complete operas for Cetra Records, including such bel canto works as Lucia di Lammermoor (opposite Giovanni Malipiero), La fille du régiment, Un giorno di regno, Rigoletto and La sonnambula (opposite Ferruccio Tagliavini and Cesare Siepi). Many of these recordings are available on CD re-issues.

Pagliughi was married to the tenor Primo Montanari (1895–1972). She died in Gatteo at the age of 73.

== Sources ==
- Dictionnaire des interprètes, Alain Pâris, (Éditions Robert Laffont, 1989). ISBN 2-221-06660-X
- Guide de l’opéra, Roland Mancini & Jean-Jacques Rouveroux, (Fayard, 1995). ISBN 2-213-59567-4
