= Dino Borgioli =

Italian opera singer

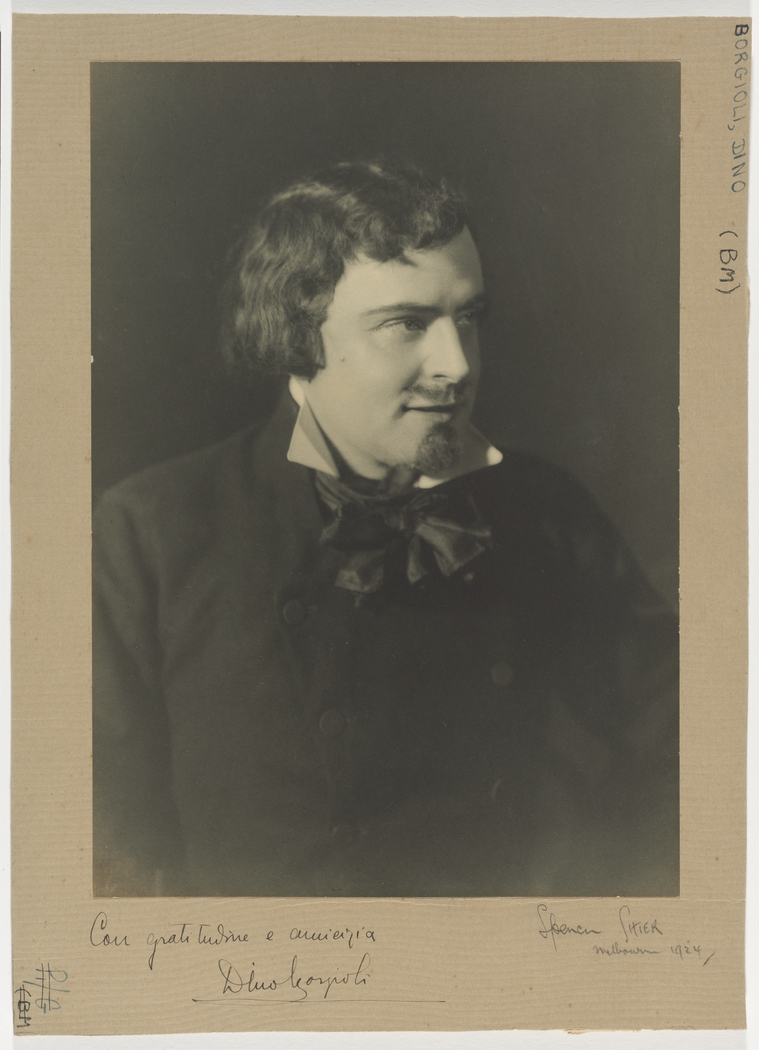
Dino Borgioli

Dino Borgioli (15 February 1891 – 12 September 1960) was an Italian lyric tenor. Praised by critics for his musicianship, he was particularly associated with roles in operas composed by Mozart, Rossini, and Donizetti.

== Life and career ==
Dino Borgioli was born and died in Florence, where he studied with Eugenio Giachetti. He made his operatic debut in 1914, as Arturo in I puritani, at the Teatro Corso in Milan. He then sang the role of Fernand in La favorite at the Teatro Dal Verme, before making his La Scala debut in 1918 as Ernesto in Don Pasquale.

In 1924, he was the lead tenor in the Melba-Williamson Grand Opera tour of Australia, opening the Sydney season opposite Nellie Melba in La bohème.

On the international scene, Borgioli debuted at the Royal Opera House in London, as Edgardo in Lucia di Lammermoor, opposite Toti Dal Monte in 1925—and at the Glyndebourne Festival where he sang as Ottavio in Don Giovanni, and as Ernesto. He also appeared in Paris, at both the Opéra-Comique and the Palais Garnier, as Almaviva in The Barber of Seville, Ramiro in La Cenerentola, the Duke of Mantua in Rigoletto, Ottavio, Edgardo and des Grieux in Manon.

The role of Cavaradossi in Tosca was his debut role for both the San Francisco Opera in 1932, and the Lyric Opera of Chicago in 1933. He made his debut at the Metropolitan Opera in New York City on 31 December 1934 as Rodolfo in La bohème. Borgioli appeared there for one season only: his other roles were Ottavio and des Grieux (Manon).

He gave singing lessons to Charles Craig and Joan Hammond.

== Recordings ==
Borgioli made a number of gramophone records which confirm the attractiveness of his lyric voice and the elegance of his phrasing. These qualities can be discerned in his two famous near-complete recordings of The Barber of Seville and Rigoletto which he made in 1929 and 1928 respectively for Columbia opposite baritone Riccardo Stracciari under the baton of Lorenzo Molajoli. He was overshadowed, both live and on disc, by another stylish lyric tenore di grazia of that era, Tito Schipa.

In 1949 Borgioli became director of vocal studies at the New Opera Company of London, where he directed stage productions of The Barber of Seville and La bohème. He died at 69 in his native Florence.

== Sources ==
- D. Hamilton (ed.),The Metropolitan Opera Encyclopedia: A Complete Guide to the World of Opera (Simon and Schuster, New York 1987). ISBN 0-671-61732-X
- Roland Mancini and Jean-Jacques Rouveroux, (orig. H. Rosenthal and J. Warrack, French edition), Guide de l’opéra, Les indispensables de la musique (Fayard, 1995). ISBN 2-213-59567-4
- Bob Rideout, "Dino Borgioli" (in "Étude" n°15, October–November–December 2000, pp. 3–9, Journal of Association internationale de chant lyrique "Titta Ruffo", Prof. Jean-Pierre Mouchon, ed., Marseilles, France).
- Tom Kaufman, "Dino Borgioli: Chronology" (in ibid., n°15, October–November–December 2000, pp. 10–25, Journal of Association internationale de chant lyrique "Titta Ruffo", Prof. Jean-Pierre Mouchon, ed., Marseilles, France).
- Katherine Brisbane (ed.), "Entertaining Australia : an illustrated history" (Sydney : Currency Press, 1991). ISBN 0-86819-286-4, ISBN 0-86819-367-4 (pbk.)
