= Tino Folgar =

Spanish operatic tenor

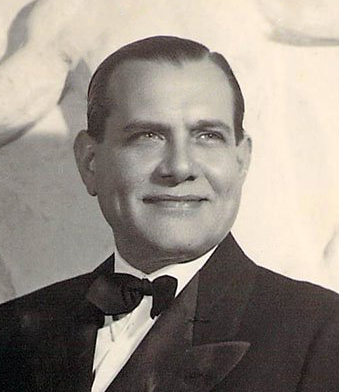
Tino Folgar

Tino Folgar (1892–1982) was a Spanish operatic tenor, primarily active in Spain and Italy.

== Early life and career ==
Born Juventino Folgar Ascaso in Barcelona, on 25 January 1892, he studied in his native city with Esteban Pasqual and made his stage debut at the Liceu as Rodolfo in La bohème, in 1922. He made his debut in Italy in Acqui Terme, as Almaviva in Il barbiere di Siviglia, in 1925.

He went on appearing in Genoa, Turin, Cremona, and scored a triumph at the Teatro Adriano in Rome, as Lindoro in L'italiana in Algeri, opposite Conchita Supervia, in 1926. He is partly responsible for the Rossini renaissance, alongside Supervia.

From 1929, he appeared mainly in Spain, singing in zarzuela and operetta. In 1932, he went to London, on tour with a zarzuela-ensemble. He then sang mostly in concert and on radio, he also appeared in a feature film La Canción del Dia.

== Later life and death ==
In 1945, he went to Mexico City where he worked as a teacher, later moving to Buenos Aires, where he remained until his death in December 1982.

A stylish and refined artist, Folgar possessed a rather small but attractive voice, which he passed to posterity through his 1927 recording of the Duke of Mantua in a complete Rigoletto, opposite Luigi Piazza, Lina Pagliughi, and Salvatore Baccaloni.

== Sources ==
- Operissimo.com, "Folgar, Tino"
- Enciclopèdia Catalana, "Juventí Folgar i Ascaso"
