= Andrea Mastroni =

Italian opera singer

Andrea Mastroni is an Italian basso profondo. Born in Milan, he first studied clarinet before training as a singer and studying philosophical aesthetics.

== Career ==
Mastroni made his opera debut in Aida (Re / Ramphis), followed by operas in different styles, such as Die Zauberflöte (Sarastro), Turandot (Timur), La Bohème (Colline), Rigoletto (Sparafucile), Le Nozze di Figaro (Figaro), Lucia di Lammermoor (Raimondo), Il Trovatore (Ferrando), Don Giovanni (Leporello), Don Pasquale (Don Pasquale), Il barbiere di Siviglia (Don Basilio), L’Italiana in Algeri (Mustafa), Il matrimonio segreto (Conte Robinson), Die sieben Todsünden by Weill (Vater) and the world premiere of Romeo e Giulietta by Marchetti (Baldassarre).

In later seasons he has incorporated roles such as Lord Sidney (Il Viaggio a Reims conducted by Alberto Zedda in an Emilio Sagi production at the Rossini Opera Festival in Pesaro), Oroveso (Norma), Frère Laurent (Roméo et Juliette), Osmin (Die Entführung aus dem Serail), Pirro (I Lombardi), Banquo (Macbeth), Frate (Don Carlo), Oroe (Semiramide) and Caronte (L’Orfeo).

Andrea Mastroni has performed in the main opera houses and festivals in Italy, Spain, Germany and Austria and his recordings include operas such as Romeo e Giulietta by Marchetti (Dynamic), I Vespri Siciliani (Naxos, DVD and CD), Roméo et Juliette by Gounod (Decca), Semiramide (Naxos, Grammy 2012) and Lamento (Brilliant Classics), with Henri Duparc's songs for voice and piano. Lied and song form an important facet of his career, with a focus on song cycles such as Schubert's Die Schöne Müllerin and Winterreise and Schumann's Dichterliebe, while his concert repertoire features pieces such as Mozart's Requiem, Krönungsmesse and Litaniae Lauretanae, Rossini's Petite Messe Solennelle Verdi's Requiem.

He has performed in the world premieres of Messa Chigiana by Lavagnino, Hazon's Requiem, Arnaboldi's Dante Racconta l’Inferno, La Signora di Monza by Belisario and, opening the 2016/2017 season at La Fenice in Venice, Aquagranda, by Filippo Perocco.

In the 2017/2018 season, as well as having opened the seasons at Hamburg (Die Zauberflöte) and Venice (Aquagranda), he made his debut at the New York Metropolitan and he will make his debut at the Royal Opera House in Covent Garden, London (Don Carlo and Rigoletto).
