= Vincenzo Bettoni =

Italian opera singer (1881–1954)

Signed photograph of Vincenzo Bettoni

Vincenzo Bettoni (1 July 1881, Melegnano – 4 November 1954, Milan) was an Italian operatic bass who performed internationally from 1902 to 1950. He was a resident artist at La Scala in Milan from 1926 to 1940, and afterwards continued to appear periodically as a guest artist at that house through 1950. Other opera houses he sang with during his career included the Liceu in Barcelona, the Royal Opera House in London, the Teatro Colón in Buenos Aires, the Teatro di San Carlo in Naples, the Teatro Regio in Turin, the Vienna State Opera, and the Zürich Opera among others.

Vincenzo Bettoni in The Fair at Sorochyntsi, Teatro alla Scala, Milan (autographed photo).

Vincenzo Bettoni in L'italiana in Algeri, Teatro alla Scala (photo with dedication).

Vincenzo Bettoni in Mârouf, Teatro alla Scala, 1938-1939.
