= Erna Berger =

German soprano (1900–1990)

- Born: 19 October 1900
- Died: 14 June 1990 (aged 89)
- Occupation: Soprano

Erna Berger (19 October 1900 – 14 June 1990) was a German lyric coloratura soprano. She was best known for roles such as Queen of the Night and Konstanze.

== Career ==
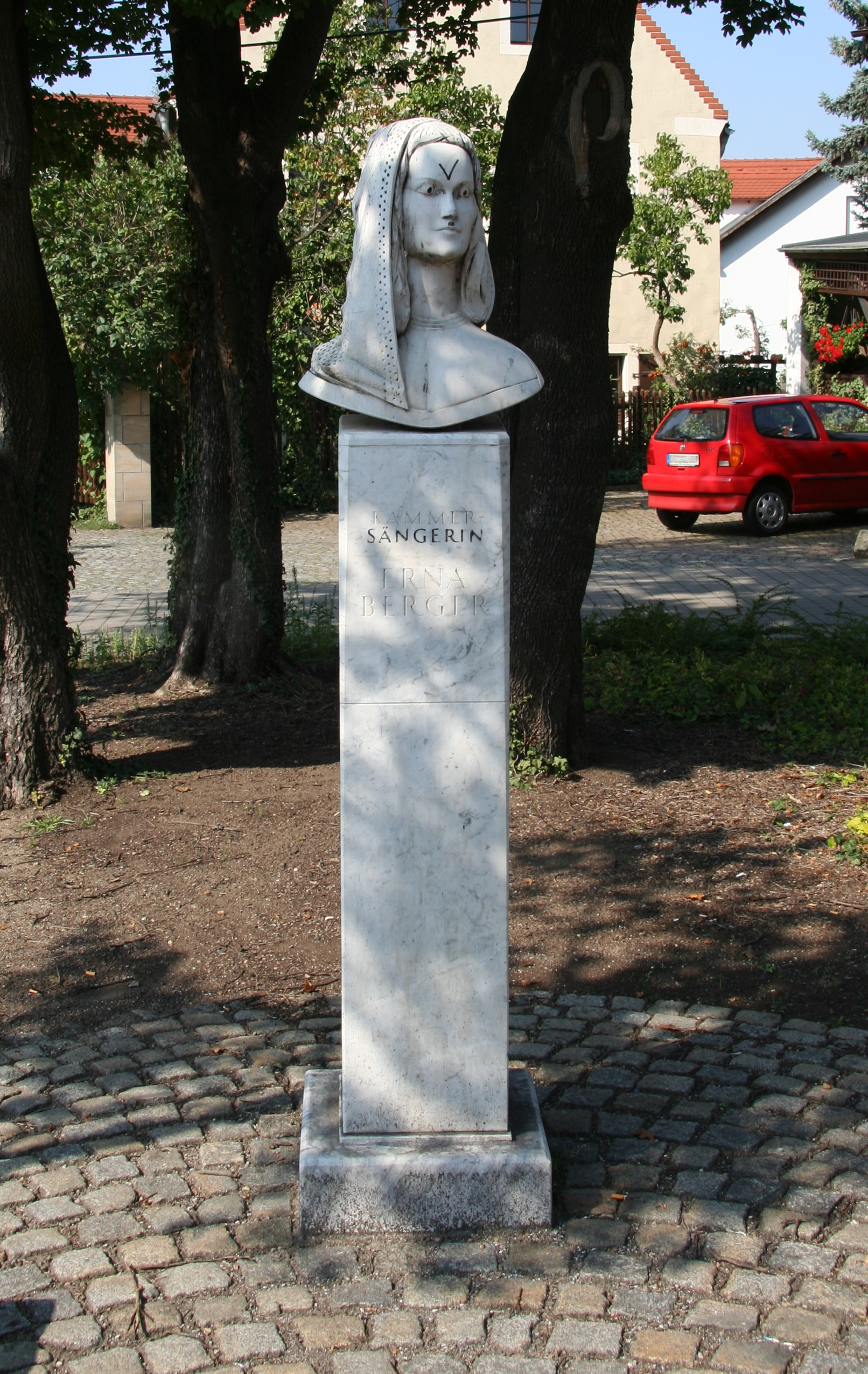
Commemorative stele of Erna Berger in Dresden-Cossebaude

Born in Dresden, Germany, Berger spent some years as a child in India and in Paraguay where the family lived in a rainforest. She worked as a governess, taking piano and singing lessons before borrowing enough money for the trip back to Germany.

At age 26, she secured a position as a soubrette soprano at the Semperoper in Dresden, and had her first success as Hannele in Paul Graener's opera Hanneles Himmelfahrt, based on Gerhart Hauptmann's play The Assumption of Hannele. She later held leading positions at the Vienna State Opera, the Berlin State Opera, and the Deutsche Oper Berlin. She gave concerts in Japan, the United States, and Australia.

Her discography features complete recordings of Die Zauberflöte (as the Queen of Night, conducted by Sir Thomas Beecham, 1937–38, for EMI), and Rigoletto, with Jan Peerce and Leonard Warren, conducted by Renato Cellini (1950) which was the first complete opera recording (with a few minor cuts) made in the United States by RCA Victor for commercial release on the then-new LP format.

Erna Berger was a member of the Berlin State Opera from 1934 to 1946. She is listed on 'Gottbegnadeten-Liste [God's Gifted List]' by Goebbels as an important artist of the Nazi state.

Berger made her debut at the Metropolitan Opera in 1949. In October 1949, May and June 1951, she sang three Gildas (Rigoletto) at Covent Garden, London. During the 1949/50 and 1950/51 seasons, she appeared in Der Rosenkavalier (opposite Eleanor Steber and Risë Stevens, conducted by Fritz Reiner and directed by Herbert Graf), Rigoletto (with Warren, then Enzo Mascherini), Die Zauberflöte, and Il barbiere di Siviglia (with Giuseppe Valdengo). She also sang Woglinde and the Waldvogel in Der Ring des Nibelungen, with Kirsten Flagstad and Helen Traubel alternating as Brünnhilde.

She sang the role of Zerlina in the 1954 Salzburg Festival production of Don Giovanni conducted by Wilhelm Furtwängler, filmed by Paul Czinner and released on DVD by Deutsche Grammophon. As an interpreter of Lieder, she often performed with the German pianist Sebastian Peschko.

== Later years and death ==
Despite advancing years Berger's voice did not lose its purity, range and beautiful tone. Though she retired from the operatic stage in 1955, she continued to sing in recitals well into her 60s, giving her last song recital in Munich in 1968. In 1980, to celebrate her eightieth birthday, she "spontaneously sang over live German television Schubert's 'Im Abendroth' with moving devotion and a fine, warm quality."

Between 1960 and 1971 Berger taught at Hamburg and Essen. She was highly respected by her colleagues; as Furtwängler said: ‘She is music, through and through…the best’. She died in Essen in 1990, aged 89. She was buried at the Zentralfriedhof, Vienna. In 1992, the Bästleinstraße in Dresden was renamed the Erna-Berger-Straße in her honour.

== Selected filmography ==
- Schlußakkord (1936)
- Ave Maria (1936, staging of La traviata)
- Maria Ilona (1939)
- Opera Ball (1939, vocals)
- Falstaff in Vienna (1940)
- The Swedish Nightingale (1941, vocals)
- Whom the Gods Love (1942)
- Immensee (1943, vocals)
- The Marriage of Figaro (1949, vocals for Susanna)
- Don Giovanni (1955, directed by Paul Czinner, as Zerlina)

== Sources ==
- Höcker, Karla (1961). Erna Berger: die singende Botschafterin. Rembrandt Verlag.
