= Rudolf Bockelmann =

German opera singer

Rudolf Bockelmann (born 2 April 1892 in Bodenteich, died 9 October 1958 in Dresden) was a German dramatic baritone and Kammersänger. He built an international career as an outstanding Wagnerian singer but damaged his reputation during the 1930s by joining the Nazi Party.

== Biography ==
Bockelmann, the son of a village schoolmaster, was born at Bodenteich near Celle. He studied philology and music at the University of Music and Theatre Leipzig. Soon after his graduation he volunteered as a soldier during World War I, and was wounded several times while fighting for his country. After the war he made his operatic debut in 1920 in Celle, and from 1921 to 1926 he sang as a member of the Oper Leipzig's company.

Bockelmann's opera career in Germany would hit its peak during the 1930s and last until the 1950s. At the height of his vocal powers, in 1932, he was engaged by the Berlin State Opera, remaining connected to the company until 1944. He sang often at Germany's Bayreuth Festival, too. His first Bayreuth appearance occurred in 1928, and he returned there regularly until 1942. Above all, he was famed for his performances of heroic baritone roles such as that of Wotan in Die Walküre and Das Rheingold. He was equally renowned for his assumption of the dramatically demanding part of Hans Sachs in The Mastersingers of Nuremberg.

Bockelmann enjoyed a successful overseas career as well. He undertook many guest performances prior to World War II at the Royal Opera House, Covent Garden, in London, and at the Chicago Opera in the United States, performing Wagner's works in the main.

In 1937, Bockelmann joined the NSDAP (Nazi Party) and was registered under the membership number 5,849,261. He then became a member of the Präsidialbeirat Comradeship of German Artists within the Ministry of Arts. In August 1944, during the final phase of World War II, Adolf Hitler included him in the Gottbegnadeten list, which gave the names of the most important artists active in Germany under the Third Reich. He was also appointed a music professor to the Imperial School of Music in Salzburg.

Bockelmann made a number of 78-rpm recordings of Wagnerian arias and other pieces of vocal music in the 1930s and '40s, including songs with a Nazi agenda. His voice was impressively powerful, steady and wide-ranging, with a warm and attractive timbre. It can be heard on various CD re-issues.

After World War II, Bockelmann was criticised for his Nazi links and his career was restricted thenceforth to the German stage. He sang mainly at the Hamburg State Opera and Hans Hotter succeeded him as Germany's foremost heroic baritone in the international arena. His death occurred in 1958 at the age of 66, in Dresden.
