= Maria Ivogün =

German opera singer

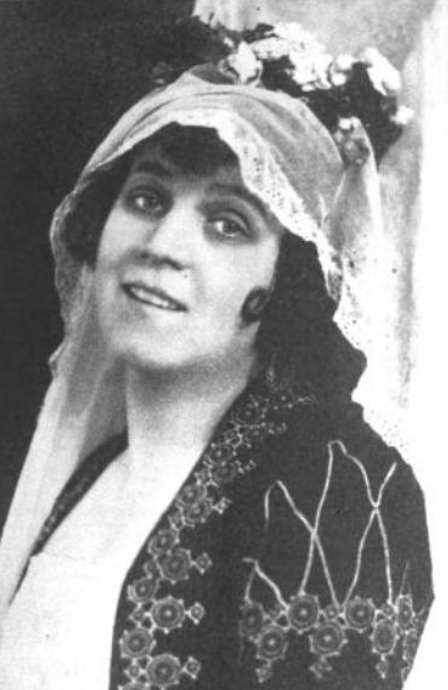
- Ivogün in 1922
- Born: Mária Ida Jolán Kempner; 18 November 1891; Budapest, Austria-Hungary
- Died: 3 October 1987 (aged 95); Beatenberg, Canton of Bern, Switzerland
- Other names: Maria Raucheisen; Maria Erb
- Education: Imperial Academy of Music and the Performing Arts
- Spouses: Karl Erb (m. 1921; div. 1932) Michael Raucheisen (m. 1933)

Maria Ivogün (married name Raucheisen; formerly Erb; 18 November 1891 – 3 October 1987), born Mária Ida Jolán Kempner, was a Hungarian opera singer, soprano and educator active in Germany. She was an especially outstanding interpreter of the works of Mozart: her recording of the aria of the Queen of the Night (Die Zauberflöte) became legendary.

== Early life and education ==
Ivogün was born Mária Ida Jolán Kempner (Note: Also cited as Ilse Kempner.) on 18 November 1891 in Budapest, Austria-Hungary (present-day Hungary). Ivogün's mother, Ida von Günther, was a singer from whom she devised her stage name and her father, Colonel Pál Kempner, was an Austro-Hungarian colonel. She spent the greater part of her childhood and youth in Zürich.

From 1907 to 1913, Ivogün studied at the Imperial Academy of Music and the Performing Arts under Irene Schlemmer-Ambros.

== Career ==
When the young soprano sang in 1913 at the Vienna Hofoper, she was overlooked. However, the house conductor there, Bruno Walter, recognized her outstanding talent and engaged her for his new workplace at the Hofoper in Munich. She gave her debut in Munich in the role of Mimi in Puccini's La bohème. Three years later, in 1916, she sang the role of Zerbinetta in the re-worked version of Ariadne auf Naxos in Vienna at the express wish of the composer Richard Strauss. In the same year she replaced an indisposed singer as Queen of the Night in Mozart's The Magic Flute, a role for which Maria Ivogün became very highly regarded and with which she laid the foundation of her success.

By 1916 Ivogün was reckoned among the best female singers in Europe and had roles in operas such as Fidelio (Marzelline), Così fan tutte, The Marriage of Figaro and many others. Moreover she became well known as Zerbinetta in Richard Strauss’ Ariadne auf Naxos.

In 1917 the title of Royal Bavarian Kammersängerin was bestowed upon her. In the same year she sang the boy-role of Ighino in the original production of Hans Pfitzner's Palestrina opposite the tenor Karl Erb, her future husband, in the title-role. In two further important original productions in Munich, Ivogün took on leading roles: in Der Ring des Polykrates of the then barely 19-year-old Erich Wolfgang Korngold (first performance 28 March 1916) she sang Laura, and in Walter Braunfels's Die Vögel (first performance 4 December 1920) she took the part of the Nightingale. In the theatrical season of 1925/1926 Ivogün followed Bruno Walter to the State Opera in Berlin. She remained there as a member of the regular company until 1932.

The highly celebrated soprano made countless concert-tours and guest opera appearances both within Germany and beyond. She appeared above all at La Scala, Milan, the Vienna State Opera, Covent Garden, London and the Chicago Opera. When she fell ill with an eye illness, she ended her operatic career in 1932 and in 1934 her career as a singer of lieder. From 1948 to 1950 Ivogün taught at the Music High School in Vienna, and finally she became a professor at the Hochschule in Berlin.

== Work ==
Today, Maria Ivogün is considered to have been one of the best and most distinguished female opera singers of the twentieth century. In the period between the two World Wars. Very many recorded performances (also with Karl Erb, her first husband) are to be included among her artistic achievements.

Maria Ivogün worked as the teacher and mentor of many distinguished female singers of opera and entertainment music. Among her students are numbered above all the opera singers Elisabeth Schwarzkopf, Rita Streich, Evelyn Lear, Renate Holm and Helga Kosta; the theatrical singer Gitta Lind, much loved in the 1950s, was her also one of her students.

== Personal life ==
In 1921, Ivogün married Karl Erb but later divorced in 1932. The following year Ivogün married her pianist-accompanist Michael Raucheisen.

She spent her twilight years in Switzerland, virtually blind, and died in Beatenberg, Switzerland in 1987. The singer's last resting place was at the side of her second husband, Michael Raucheisen, in the city cemetery of Rain, Switzerland.

== Selected filmography ==
- The Loves of Casanova (1927)

== Discography (selected) ==
- Maria Ivogün – The complete recordings – 17 unpublished items 1916–1919
- Die goldene Stimme – Maria Ivogün
- Ivogün – Prima Voce Nimbus 7832
