= Heinrich Rehkemper =

German opera singer

Heinrich Rehkemper (23 May 1894 in Schwerte - 30 December 1949 in Munich) was a German baritone singer whose repertoire was in opera and Lieder, and whose career was principally in Germany between the First and Second World War. The greater part of his career was spent as leading baritone at the Munich opera house.

Rehkemper studied at Düsseldorf, and made his debut in opera in Die Faschingsfee by Emmerich Kálmán in 1919, at Coburg. Over the next two years he also sang there in Nicolai's Die lustigen Weiber von Windsor, in Lohengrin, Carmen and Cavalleria rusticana. From 1921 to 1924 he was engaged at the Stuttgart opera, and during the first three years of this time he sang over forty different lead roles. At the end of three years he broke his contract, and was therefore legally forbidden to make stage appearances for the final year. In that time he began to develop his concert repertoire and persona. He gave recitals of songs by Schubert, Schumann, Wolf and Mahler: he also took the baritone solo role in a performance of Beethoven's 9th Symphony, and in J. S. Bach's St. John Passion in a performance at Vienna.

In 1925, he returned to the operatic stage, joining the Munich opera house company, where Hans Knappertsbusch was taking over direction from Bruno Walter. The leading baritone Friedrich Brodersen found a successor in Rehkemper, who remained at Munich for the next eighteen years. His operatic repertoire was extensive. He played Mozart's Papageno, both the Conte and Figaro, Guglielmo and Don Giovanni; Wagner's Amfortas, Beckmesser and Donner; Verdi's Macbeth, Posa and Don Carlo; Puccini's Marcello and Michele; and Malatesta in Don Pasquale. In the German repertoire he had roles in Pfitzner's Palestrina and Das Herz; Schultze's Schwarzer Peter; Eugen d'Albert's Tiefland, Goetze's Widerspenstigen Zähmung, Jokanaan in Richard Strauss's Salome, and others. He seldom sang outside Germany, but he made guest appearances at other centres such as Berlin, Bremen, Darmstadt and Cologne. After the Munich opera house was bombed in a 1943 air-raid, his connection with it came to an end.

Rehkemper also had a wide repertoire of Lieder, notably songs by Schumann, Schubert, Hugo Wolf, Grieg, Richard Strauss and the Austrian composer Siegmund von Hausegger. In 1931 he gave a recital of Strauss Lieder at Munich with the composer as pianist. He performed song-cycles, notably Winterreise, von Hausegger's Hymns to the Night, and Mahler's Lieder eines fahrenden Gesellen and Kindertotenlieder, the latter being preserved in an effective recording.

== Recordings ==
Rehkemper made many recordings. Three compilations are available on CD published by Preiser Records in the Lebendige Vergangenheit series.

== Sources ==
- A. Eaglefield-Hull, A Dictionary of Modern Music and Musicians (Dent, London 1924).
- R. D. Darrell, The Gramophone Shop Encyclopedia of Recorded Music (New York, 1936).
- M. Scott, The Record of Singing Volume II (Duckworth, London 1979), 223-225.
