= Karl Erb =

German opera singer

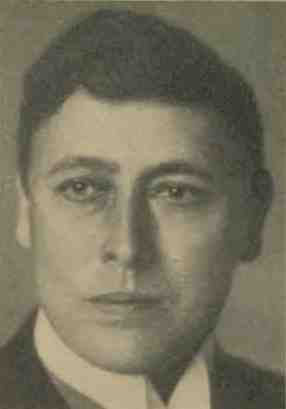
- Karl Erb in 1912
- Born: Karl Erb; 13 July 1877; Ravensburg, German Empire
- Died: 13 July 1958 (aged 81); Ravensburg, West Germany
- Occupation: Operatic tenor
- Spouse: Maria Ivogün (m. 1921; div. 1932)

Karl Erb (13 July 1877 – 13 July 1958) was a German tenor who made his career first in opera and then in oratorio and lieder recital. He excelled in all these genres, and before 1920 gave classic performances of key roles in modern works, and created lead roles in those of Hans Pfitzner. He was the first husband of Maria Ivogün and was considered by many the ideal Evangelist in Bach's St Matthew Passion.

== Origins and early training ==
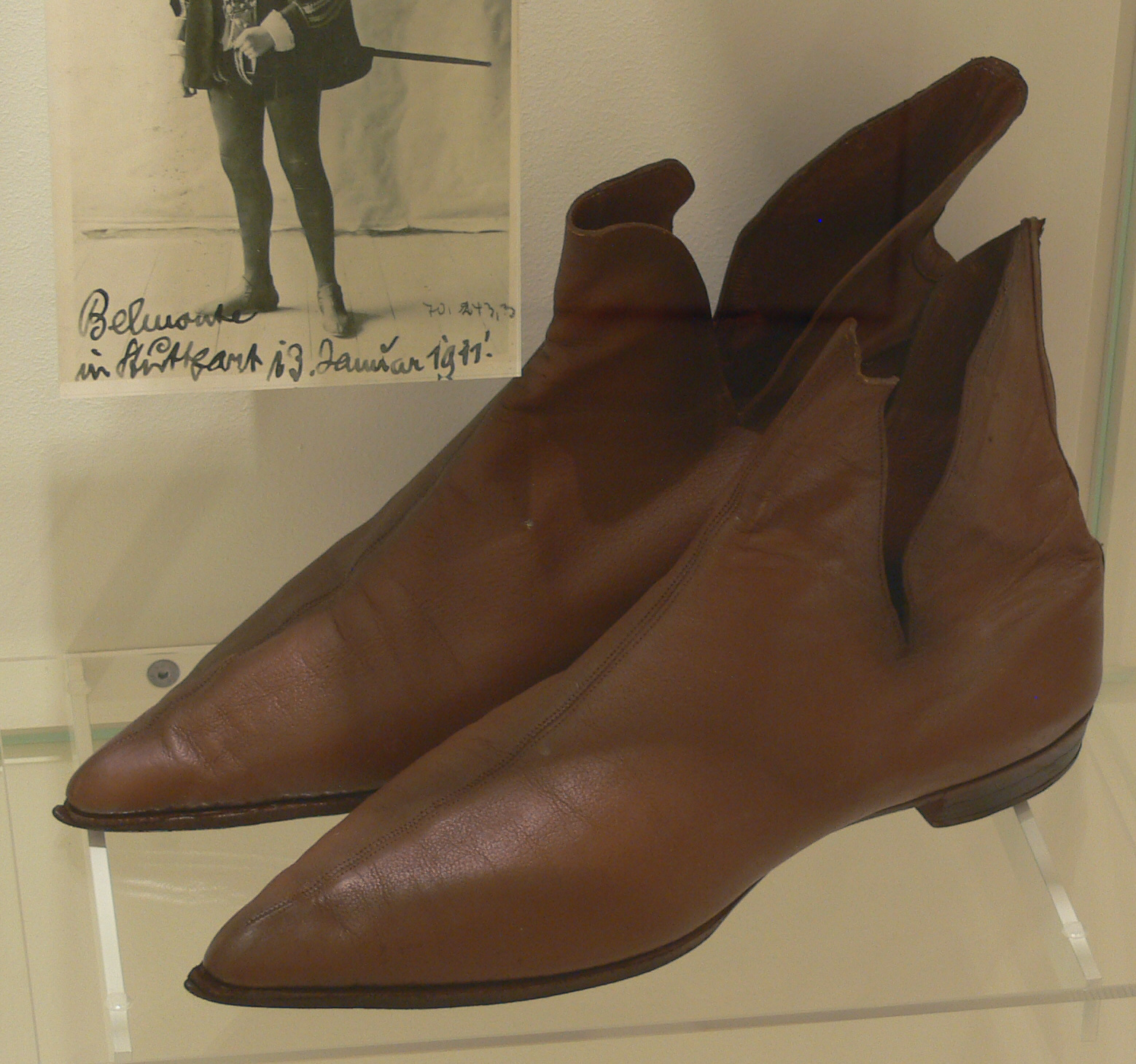
Karl Erb stageshoes at the Humpis-Quartier museum in Ravensburg, Germany

Erb was born in Ravensburg. As a child, he was enrolled in the local Liebfrauenkirche charity choir and music class. His mother taught him to love poetry and he excelled at school. His voice did not break abruptly, but deepened and intensified to a beautiful and spiritual timbre. He was sought out for private musical events and performed in amateur theatre at the Ravensburg Konzerthaus. He later worked at Wolfegg and at Rot as cashier for the State Gas and Waterworks. In 1902, the Königliches Hoftheater in Stuttgart burnt down, and the company worked temporarily in Ravensburg. Erb, assisting the choir in Cavalleria rusticana, was noticed by Joachim Gans zu Putlitz. Von Putlitz had been appointed Theatre Intendant at Munich long before through the personal efforts of Richard and Cosima Wagner, cf Ernest Newman, and offered a chance to sing solo. He declined, but further offers were made.

== Stuttgart ==
In 1906, aged 29, Erb started an unpaid probationary year at Stuttgart (beginning January 1907, which led to a five-year paid contract. He had the help of a young répétiteur, a singing teacher, a drama tutor (Hans Islaub, who got rid of his Swabian accent) and a ballet master. He studied the roles of Max in Weber's Der Freischütz, Lionel in Flotow's Martha, Walter in Wagner's Die Meistersinger von Nürnberg and Mathias in Der Evangelimann by Wilhelm Kienzl. Through the singer Elsa Wiborg, he was given the chance to sing privately for the King and Queen; then, on 14 June 1907, he made his debut in Evangelimann at the new Hoftheater. Erb was also gave recitals and made oratorio appearances during his probation at Stuttgart.

He then appeared as Wagner's Lohengrin (in which the shimmering brightness of his voice was especially effective), as Buddha in Adolf Vogel's Maja, as Little Massarena in Le domino noir, Achilles i Gluck's Iphigenia in Aulis, Walter and as Gounod's Faust. By the end of the trial year he had sung at the Hoftheater at 30 evenings or masterclasses: an unparalleled success. Soon afterwards, at von Putlitz's urging, Erb took singing lessons from Felix Decken, a tenorbuffo, who tried to break and rebuild his technique. Erb, deeply undermined, sacked him and nearly broke with von Putlitz, but instead they agreed that he pass the winter season 1908 as leading lyric tenor for the brand-new Theatre at Lübeck.

== Lübeck ==
Erb opened triumphantly (October 1908) in Lohengrin. He maintained a sober existence, but gravitated to the social circle of Ida Boy-Ed, where he mixed with Hermann Abendroth, Wilhelm Furtwängler and others. He travelled to Hamburg to see Caruso and Edith Walker in Puccini's Tosca. Greatly inspired, he added Lionel (Martha), Manrico (Il trovatore), Gomez (Das Nachtlager in Granada (Kreutzer)), Froh (Das Rheingold), Florestan (Fidelio), Alessandro Stradella in Friedrich von Flotow's opera, the Duke of Mantua (Rigoletto), Turiddu (Cavalleria rusticana), Fenton (Die lustigen Weiber von Windsor (Carl Otto Nicolai)), Hoffmann in Jacques Offenbach's opera, and Alfred in Die Fledermaus to his repertoire. All these roles were sung in German.

In April 1909 at the end of his first season in Lübeck, he returned to Stuttgart and showed how he had benefited from the experience. He returned to Lübeck for a second season in Autumn 1909, adding Tannhäuser, Les Huguenots, Die Zauberflöte, Die Entführung aus dem Serail, the Götterdämmerung Siegfried, Naraboth in Salome, The Barber of Seville, and Fredy Wehrburg in The Dollar Princess to his repertoire. He made his May 1910 farewell in Martha. He then sang in Kiel and Hamburg, returning to Stuttgart for the winter season of 1910.

Through Frau Boy-Ed, Erb was invited to Graf von Bernstorff's house at Lake Starnberg, where he also met Felix Mottl, Stenka Fassbender and Graf Sporck (poet-author for Cyrill Kistler's music-drama Kunihild). He sang Schubert for Mottl, who was deeply impressed, and started planning to get him to Munich. Graf Spork, a friend of the Wahnfried house, was also interested, and Erb and Frau Boy-Ed attended a Bayreuth Parsifal with him. But amid the rivalry, a place at Munich was already secure (through Mottl) when, at a concert under Siegfried Wagner's baton, Erb realized he could not work for the latter.

== Stuttgart and Munich ==
Hans Pfitzner as Director of the Strasbourg Opera from 1910, sought to stage his Der Arme Heinrich at Stuttgart, but needed a suitable tenor to convey the spiritual depths of the work. Von Putlitz decided that Erb was the only singer suitable. Pfitzner himself came to Stuttgart to ask him, and he made a great success. The Munich Hoftheater, urged by Mottl, offered to engage him when the Stuttgart contract ended. Erb wanted to go, but there were three years remaining at Stuttgart: he declined a Munich offer of a guest Tannhaüser as too heavy for his voice.

However Pfitzner, seeking to raise a Munich Hoftheater boycott on performance of his works, rewrote the Arme Heinrich role for Erb, and staged it with him at the Prinzregententheater at Munich, privately, whereupon von Speidel for the Hoftheater asked Erb his price and was told 24,000 Marks per year. Munich offered a guest role in Lohengrin, which he took, and later a Florestan and a Hoffmann. In 1912 and 1913 he sang six performances a month at Stuttgart and fitted in guest appearances at Tübingen, Ulm, Lübeck, Berlin, and Wiesbaden. In September 1912 the new Stuttgart Hoftheater was completed and Erb sang Walter in Meistersinger.

A month later, 25 October, at Stuttgart, Richard Strauss conducted the première of his Ariadne auf Naxos. The first and third performances were with the élite soloists Maria Jeritza, Margarethe Siems, Herman Jadlowker: the second was the Stuttgart team, Erb as Bacchus. In May 1913 at the Imperial performance at Wiesbaden he sang Hüon in Oberon. The Kaiser said to him, 'You must be a good Lohengrin. Tell Baron von Putlitz I thank him for having sent such a good performer of Huon.' Erb's farewell to Stuttgart after his six years there was as Lohengrin.

== Munich ==
Soon after arrival at Munich in 1913, where Bruno Walter (from Vienna) had succeeded Mottl, Erb appeared as Loge in Das Rheingold. He completely rethought the part, dispensing with Briesemeister's flaming and dancing impersonation. Walter realised he was a thinking artist, and the Press had 'not seen such a Loge since Bayreuth'. He sang this role (his 42nd) for 12 years at the Munich Festivals. In a September 1913 double-bill Caruso sang Canio at Munich but left Turiddu to Erb. He now sang Erik, Tannhäuser, Loge, Pinkerton and Cavaradossi. His dramatic skills were admired as Achilles in Gluck's Iphigenia in Aulis, and he sang Graf Adolar in Weber's Euryanthe. In 1914, when Parsifal was first freely given in Germany, he was the first Munich Parsifal, bringing spiritual and religious insight.

He was already singing Strauss's Bacchus and Naraboth, and Pfitzner's Arme Heinrich. Bruno Walter brought Hugo Wolf's Der Corregidor to Munich Festival for him, at some expense, and Erb became completely, almost exclusively associated with it. The theatre valued his growing dramatic power and insight, and he relished such works as Franz Schreker's Der ferne Klang and (later) Die Gezeichneten.

During the War the work of the theatre was reduced, and restricted to German and Italian music. In summer 1916, he travelled with the Stuttgart Theatre ensemble to France and Belgium to sing and play to the German troops. He encountered Ravensburger soldiers at Lille. In Brussels, after a concert, an officer gave him his gold finger-ring as the token of homage to his art, from him, an unknown soldier returning to the front who should perhaps be dead tomorrow. Erb wore it until the outbreak of the second war.

St Matthew Passion
In 1914, Bruno Walter persuaded Erb that he should sing the Evangelist in Bach's St Matthew Passion. His first performance was at the Munich Odeon, March 28, 1915, with Paul Bender as Jesus. In that period he was learning the Pfitzner, Wolf and Schreker roles, and (by his own account) increasingly sought to develop the emotional, spiritual and intellectual depth of his interpretations. He sank his whole artistic personality into the Evangelist, reading what Albert Schweitzer and Heuser had written.

In 1915, Paul Ehlers described him as the finest Evangelist since Heinrich Vogl. A 1916 performance in Cologne received favorable reviews and praise for his versatility from [Hermann Abendroth] and members of the press. The poet Romain Rolland attended a performance on 10 March 1916 at Basel Minster, conducted by Herman Suter with Maria Philippi, and subsequently wrote favorably about the performance. His performances also received attention in Amsterdam.

Pfitzner's Palestrina
Munich's greatest wartime artistic project was the premiere of Hans Pfitzner's Palestrina in 1917. Erb created the title role, with Maria Ivogün as Ighino. Fritz Feinhals and Friedrich Brodersen also sang and Walter conducted. The Swiss took the whole show with the Munich ensemble, in midst of war, to Basel, Bern and Zürich. Thomas Mann, who had seen Erb's St Matthew Passion, described how he completely grasped the spiritual meaning of Palestrina, and Pfitzner felt he had found his ideal interpreter. (Ivogün had come to Munich in Walter's troupe in 1913, and in 1916 she and Erb realised they were in love, during a performance of Erich Wolfgang Korngold's Der Ring des Polykrates.)

Erb always wanted to sing Wolfgang Amadeus Mozart roles, but it was during rehearsals for a Schreker work that he suddenly had to stand in as Belmonte in Die Entfuhrung. Erb was a very great Mozartian singer, and thereafter he played many roles, including Octavio, Belfiore, Tamino and Ferrando, as well as Belmonte. In 1918, shortly before the end of the war, the King of Bavaria bestowed on Erb (the last) title Königlich Bayerische Kammersänger. During the Rhine occupation early in 1919 Erb was touring the Rhine towns and in the Netherlands with St Matthew Passion. He was held up, returning, at Ingolstadt, and the Munich revolution had settled by the time of his return there.

== The Erb-Ivogün partnership ==
In July 1921, Erb and Maria Ivogün were married. That week Erb sang five Parsifals and a Belmonte at Zürich Festival. Over the next years their musical partnership in theatre, concert, and 'Lieder-abend', grew increasingly famous. Their voices and personalities seemed ideally matched. They appeared together as Ernesto and Norina, Almaviva and Rosina, Chateauneuf and Marie, Hoffegut and Nachtigall, Martha and Lionel, Fenton and Frau Fluth, Max and Aennchen, Wilhelm Meister and Mignon, Ritter Hugo and Undine, Fenton and Alice, Duke and Gilda, Palestrina and Ighino, Bacchus and Zerbinetta, Rudolf and Mimi, Hoffmann and Olympia, and above all in the Mozart roles, Belmonte and Konstanze, Tamino and the Queen of the Night, Ferrando and Despina and Ottavio and Zerlina. In the concert hall they sang Italian duets, duets of Handel, Schumann and Schubert, and of modern composers as yet less well-known.

Between 1920 and 1924, Ivogün toured twice in the United States on her own, and developed a large following there. The couple toured there widely together between December 1924 and late February 1925, when, after Willem Mengelberg had failed to persuade Erb to sing the St Matthew Passion in New York City, amid press sensations offering to 'buy' the performance, Erb left Maria to complete her tour and went home. He had to deliver Matthew Passions twice each in Munich, Elberfeld, Dortmund, Hagen, Cologne and Haarlem, all between 22 March and 13 April. America did not suit Erb as it suited Ivogün, and although their partnership continued for several years, they began to go their separate ways. They divorced in 1932.

== Tribulations ==
During the voyage home in March 1925, news came to the ship that Friedrich Ebert had died – and for the first time Adolf Hitler spoke again openly in Munich. His April engagements complete, and with Maria back, Erb returned to Munich ready to resume his work. But Bruno Walter had left Munich for the Berlin-Charlottenburg Städtische Oper in 1922: his successor Hans Knappertsbusch had little time for the Swabian tenor, whose contract expired in summer 1925. It was not renewed. After 12 years at Munich he was permitted a farewell (15 June) in Das Nachtlager in Granada (hardly a showcase) and Erb, who loved Munich, left in bitterness. A year later his baritone colleague Brodersen died, and was replaced by Heinrich Rehkemper: the bass Paul Bender, at Munich since 1903, remained.

Ivogün would not remain under Knappertsbusch, and went to the Berlin-Charlottenburg Oper. In 1926 Erb, Ivogün and their accompanist Michael Raucheisen were giving recitals in Bremen, and shortly before a Duetten-abend Erb tripped on the hotel steps and broke his right leg. Two painful months later in Berlin he resumed singing with Lieder-abends and a Matthew Passion. In 1927 he appeared in London, Covent Garden, as Belmonte, with Paul Bender as Osmin, and after this he sang in Berlin, in The Hague, in Halle, Düsseldorf and Mannheim, as Belmonte, Tamino, Loge, Bacchus, Ernesto and Florestan and in Der Corregidor. In summer of 1929, he sang the Matthew Passion at La Scala in Milan, to a very enthusiastic audience.

That July while swimming in the Starnbergersee Erb was dashed against a rock by the sea and found later on the beach by Frau Ivogün. By luck his life was saved, but the convalescence was long and painful and he never fully recovered. In January 1930 he reappeared before the public with Ivogün, and still in much pain travelled to the Netherlands to sing Florestan. In June 1930, he made his last operatic appearance, a performance worthy of his powers, at the Berlin-Charlottenburg Oper under Furtwängler, as Florestan. In April 1931, Erb and Ivogün were divorced, torn apart by deep and conflicting feelings. Two years later, he learnt that she had married Michael Raucheisen, his former accompanist, with whom he had hoped to work again: it was a doubly crushing blow.

== Later career ==
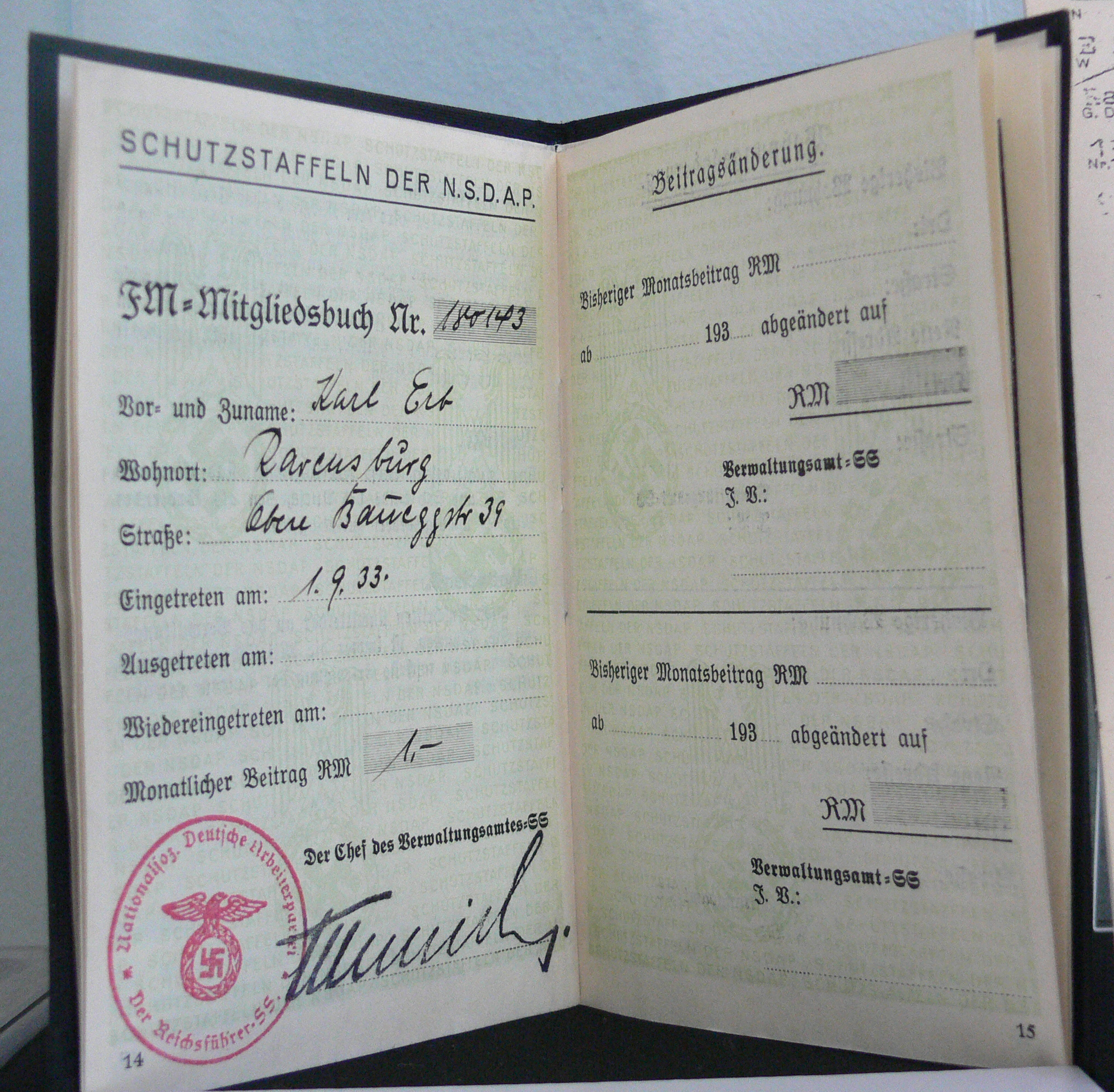
The "Förderndes Mitglied der SS" membership book of Karl Erb.

Erb continued to sing the Matthew Passion Evangelist yearly at Amsterdam for Willem Mengelberg, and in the course of thirty years sang it some 360 times, in most major German town and cities, and in Zürich, Bern, Basel, Lucerne, Solothurn, Lausanne, Milan and Brussels, under Bruno Walter, William Mengelberg, Hermann Suter, Fritz Busch, Hermann Abendroth, Alfred Sittard, Wilhelm Furtwängler, Karl Straube and Eugen Papst. With the passage of decades his interpretation grew and was increasingly called authoritative. He sang it throughout the second war, and after, in Germany: a 1940 reviewer described his Cologne cathedral performance as an 'unfassbaren, übermenschlichen, unirdisch wirklichen Vollendung' (an inconceivable, more-than-human, supernally real perfection).

When Erb left the stage his career was just entering its last great development, which was as one of the most serious and accomplished lieder singers of his age. Between 1935 and 1940 he made an impressive series of records (HMV) of Schubert, Schumann, Brahms and Wolf songs, accompanied by Sebastian Peschko, Bruno Seidler-Winkler or Gerald Moore. The many strands of his singing experience, the thoughtfulness of his Pfitzner, Wolf and Schreker, the musical discipline of his Bach and his Mozart, Beethoven, Gluck, Weber and lyric Wagner roles, had laid the foundations for this last work, in which he excelled. His vocal technique, breath control and distinctive tone survived almost unchanged into his mid-seventies. Hans Hotter, who held Erb in high esteem, said that 'it was Paul Bender and Karl Erb who sparked my great love for the art song.'

In 1947, aged 70, he gave a concert for his mother's 90th birthday in his home church at Ravensburg. His last records, five songs by Schubert, were made in December 1951 when he was 74. He died in Ravensburg, on his 81st birthday, in 1958.

== Literary reference ==
In his Doktor Faustus, Thomas Mann refers to the first performance of Adrian Leverkühn's work Apocalypse as being under Otto Klemperer in 1926 at Frankfurt. The narrator role 'is here written for a tenor..., one of castrato-like high register, whose chilly crow, objective, reporter-like, stands in terrifying contrast to the content of his catastrophic announcements.... This extremely difficult part was taken and sung by a tenor with the voice of a eunuch, named Erbe ('von einem Tenoristen eunuchalen Typs names Erbe gesungen')... the singer had with the greatest intelligence grasped the idea.' (Ch XXXIV, conclusion). The famous Mann irony applies here to the slight change of the name Erb, which has here become the German word for "heritage" – Erbe.

== Sources ==
- H. Hotter, Hans Hotter: Memoirs (Edited and translated by Donald Arthur, with foreword by Dietrich Fischer-Dieskau) (UPNE 2006). ISBN 1-55553-661-1.
- M. Müller-Gögler, Karl Erb – Das Leben eines Sängers (Verlag Franz Huber, Offenburg 1948).
- L. Riemens, 'Karl Erb, tenor' paragraph in Schumann and Brahms Lieder on Record 1901–1952 (HMV Treasury RLS 1547003), booklet compiled and ed. by Hugh Graham, 48pp. (EMI, London 1983).
- H. Rosenthal & J. Warrack, Concise Oxford Dictionary of Opera (London, 1974 vsn).
