= Patzak =

Patzak is a surname. Notable people with the surname include:

- Julius Patzak (1898–1974), Austrian tenor
- Peter Patzak (1945–2021), Austrian film director and screenwriter
