= Franz Gruber (tenor) =

German operatic tenor

Franz Gruber was a German operatic tenor who had an active career in his native country and in Austria during the first half of the 20th century.

== Professional career ==
Born in Munich, Gruber initially trained as an actor before making his opera debut in his native city in 1900. From 1901 to 1902, he worked at the Thalia-Theater in Saarbrücken. By that time, he had already begun studies as a singer, partly with his father. In 1902, he made his debut in the Stadttheater Regensburg and already in 1903, he was offered a position at the Staatstheater am Gärtnerplatz in Munich, where he achieved success primarily as an operetta singer.

Gruber continued his singing studies, and in 1915 he was engaged at the National Theatre Munich, where he made his debut as Manrico in Verdi's Il Trovatore. On 28 March 1916, he sang in the double-bill world premiere performances of Korngold's Violanta (in the role of Alfonso) and Der Ring des Polykrates (in the role of Florian). Further roles in this theater included Hoffmann in Offenbach's The Tales of Hoffmann, Don José in |Bizet's Carmen and Pedro in Albert's Tiefland. In 1918, he sang in the world premiere performance of Paul Graener's opera Theofano.

In 1921, Gruber moved to the Landestheater Dessau, where he started singing Heldentenor roles like Lohengrin, Siegmund, Siegfried, and also the Emperor in Strauss' Die Frau ohne Schatten. From 1924 to 1926, he worked at the Staatsoper Hannover, and he finished his professional career at the Stadttheater in Nuremberg, where he was active from 1926 till 1932. During this period, he also made guest appearances at the Vienna State Opera and at several major German opera houses.
