= Der Ring des Polykrates (opera) =

1916 one-act opera by Erich Wolfgang Korngold

- Opera by Erich Wolfgang Korngold
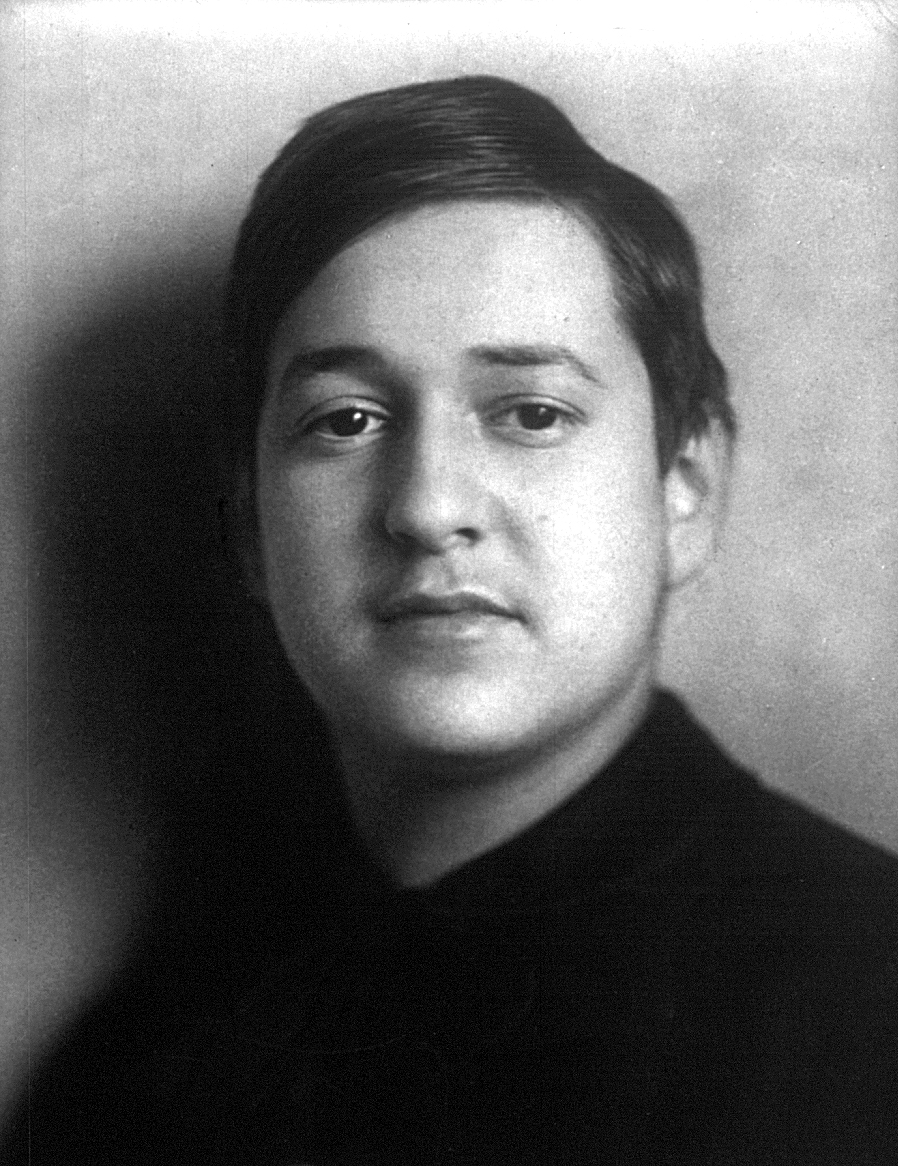
- The composer
- Translation: The Ring of Polykrates
- Librettist: Leo Feld
- Language: German
- Based on: drama by Heinrich Teweles
- Premiere: 28 March 1916; Nationaltheater München

Der Ring des Polykrates (The Ring of Polykrates), Op. 7, is a one-act opera by Erich Wolfgang Korngold. The libretto, written by Leo Feld and reworked (unattributed) by the composer's father Julius Korngold, is based on a drama by Heinrich Teweles.

== Performance history ==
Korngold composed the opera (his first) in 1914, when he was only seventeen years old. The one-act domestic comedy was contrasted by his second opera Violanta, a one-act tragedy. Both were successfully premiered together on 28 March 1916 at the National Theatre Munich. Bruno Walter conducted and the cast included Karl Erb and Maria Ivogün. The operas were repeated in Vienna, with Selma Kurz and Alfred Piccaver in Polykrates and Maria Jeritza as Violanta. In November 1916, it was given at the Dresden Hofoper, with Richard Tauber and Elisabeth Rethberg in the leading roles.

== Roles ==
Role	Voice type	Premiere cast 28 March 1916 (Conductor: – Bruno Walter)
Wilhelm Arndt, Hofkapellmeister	tenor	Karl Erb
Laura, his wife	soprano	Maria Ivogün
Florian Döblinger, timpanist and music copyist	tenor	Franz Gruber
Lieschen, Laura's servant	soprano	
Peter Vogel, Wilhelm's friend	bass	

== Synopsis ==
The librettist Leo Feld placed the story in the 18th century, when Friedrich Schiller's ballad of the same title was new.

The musician Wilhelm Arndt seems to have everything going for him: he is happily married to Laura, he has been appointed Hoffkapellmeister and he has just inherited a small fortune. Only the return of his long-lost friend Peter Vogel could make him even more happy. When Vogel actually returns, he is jealous of Wilhelm's happiness, and convinces him that in order not to challenge fate, he should sacrifice something (after the example set in Schiller's ballade Der Ring des Polykrates). Wilhelm starts an argument with his wife about her former life, but the couple's love is strong enough to overcome all difficulties. In the end, all agree that the sacrifice that has to be offered is the intriguer that tried to ruin their happiness: Peter Vogel has to leave again.

== Recordings ==
In 1996 CPO released a 1995 recording, with Klauspeter Seibel conducting the Deutsches Symphonie-Orchester Berlin and singers Beate Bilandzija, Dietrich Henschel and Jürgen Sacher.

== Piano music ==
A potpourri from Der Ring des Polykrates for piano arranged by L. Ruffin was recorded by Nimbus Records in 2001.

== Bibliography ==
- Specht, Richard. Thematische Führer zu Erich W. Korngold's "Violanta" und "Der Ring des Polykrates". Mainz and Leipzig: B. Schott's Söhne, 1916. iv, 68 pp.
