= Irene von Fladung =

Austrian opera singer

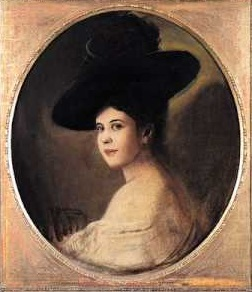
Irene von Fladung, Austrian operatic soprano

Irene von Fladung (1879–1965) was an Austrian operatic soprano. Her voice is preserved on a few recordings made with Odeon Records.

== Life and career ==
Fladung studied singing in Graz before making her professional opera debut at the Vienna State Opera in 1906. In 1907 she made her first appearances at the Bavarian State Opera (BSO) and the Bayreuth Festival. She sang annually with the BSO through 1925, during which time she also appeared as a guest artist at the Opern- und Schauspielhaus Frankfurt, Semperoper, and Staatsoper Stuttgart. She notably portrayed the role of Bice in the world premiere of Erich Wolfgang Korngold's Violanta at the National Theatre Munich in 1916. Among the other roles she performed on stage were Adele in Die Fledermaus, Blondchen in Die Entführung aus dem Serail, Cherubino in Le nozze di Figaro, Hänsel in Hänsel und Gretel, Marzelline in Fidelio, Musetta in La bohème, and Urbain in Les Huguenots.
