= Paul Kuhn (tenor) =

German opera singer (1874–1966)

Paul Kuhn (12 September 1874, Silesia – 20 June 1966, New York City) was a German operatic tenor who specialized in the buffo repertoire. He studied singing in Breslau and performed at important opera houses and festivals in Germany and Austria like the Bavarian State Opera, the Bayreuth Festival, the Darmstadt Opera, and the Salzburg Festival. He notably portrayed the role of Mateo in the world premiere of Erich Wolfgang Korngold's Violanta at the National Theatre Munich in 1916. In 1917, he created the role of Bernardo Novagerio in the premiere of Hans Pfitzner's Palestrina at the Prinzregententheater. In 1933, he and his wife, Charlotte Kuhn-Brunner, moved to the United States for political reasons.
