= Michael Raucheisen =

External audio
- Shellac recordings with Michael Raucheisen in the Online Archive of the Österreichische Mediathek

Michael Raucheisen (10 February 1889, Rain, Swabia – 27 May 1984, Beatenberg) was a German pianist and song accompanist.

== Life and career ==
Raucheisen's father was a master-glazier, and also an organist, church choir leader and musical pedagogue. The musical development of his only son was so important to the family that they left the small town in which they lived.

From 1902 Raucheisen lived in Munich, and from 1920 until the end of his pianistic activity in 1958, in Berlin. He studied at the Munich High School for Music. Around 1906 he played first violin at the Prinzregententheater and was organist in St. Michael. In 1912 he founded the musical Matinees which have become famous.

From the beginning of the 1920s until the end of the Second World War, he was song accompanist for many singers, including Frida Leider, Erna Berger, Hans Hotter, Elisabeth Schwarzkopf, Karl Schmitt-Walter, Karl Erb, Heinrich Schlusnus and Helge Rosvaenge.

As an innovation he played his accompaniments with the piano lid open, in order to obtain a better tonal balance between the voice and the instrument.

In 1933 he married the soprano Maria Ivogün, following her divorce from Erb.

From 1933 he strove to create a complete catalogue of German language songs on gramophone recordings, for which, from 1940, he became head of the department of Song and Chamber-music at the Berlin Rundfunk, for the organization of the studios there.

After the war, Raucheisen was banned from his work for some years because of his collaboration with the Nazi regime, and afterwards he appeared only occasionally in public. In 1958, after a very successful tour with Schwarzkopf, he returned to private life and moved with Ivogün to Switzerland.

On the occasion of his 95th birthday he was granted the Free Citizenship of the town of Rain.

He and his wife (who survived him by three years) are buried in the municipal cemetery of Rain.

== Literature ==
- Harald Mann: Biografie Michael Raucheisen. In: Sieh auf: Beiträge zu Geschichte und Kultur der Stadt Rain und ihrer Umgebung. Nr. 7 (April 1984)
