= Förderndes Mitglied der SS =

Voluntary financial support structure of the Allgemeine SS

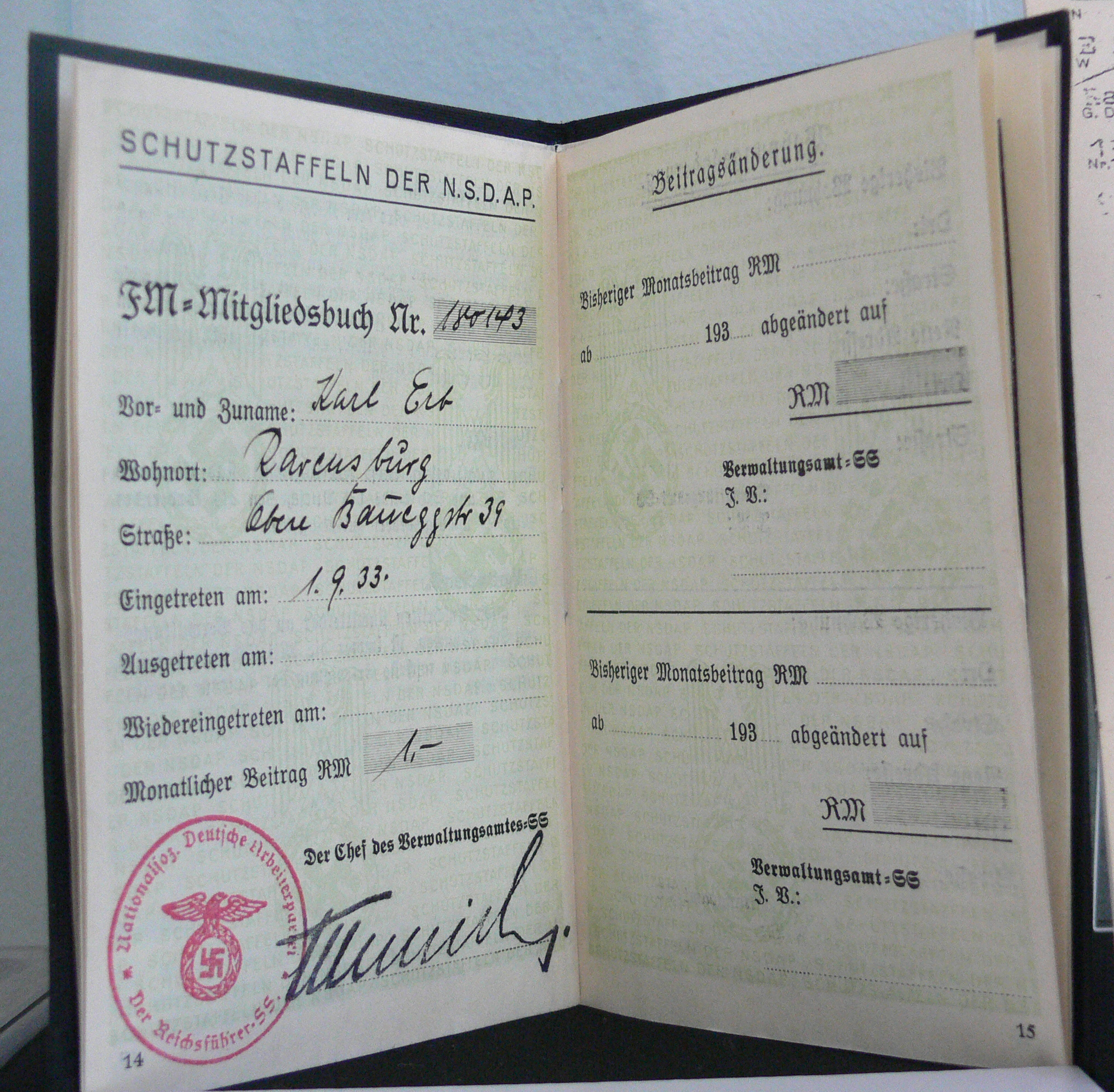
The "Fördernden Mitglieds der SS" membership book of Karl Erb.

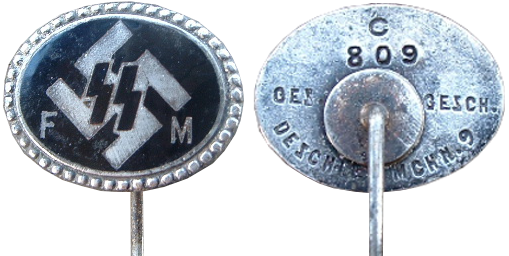
"Fördernden Mitglieds der SS" lapel pin

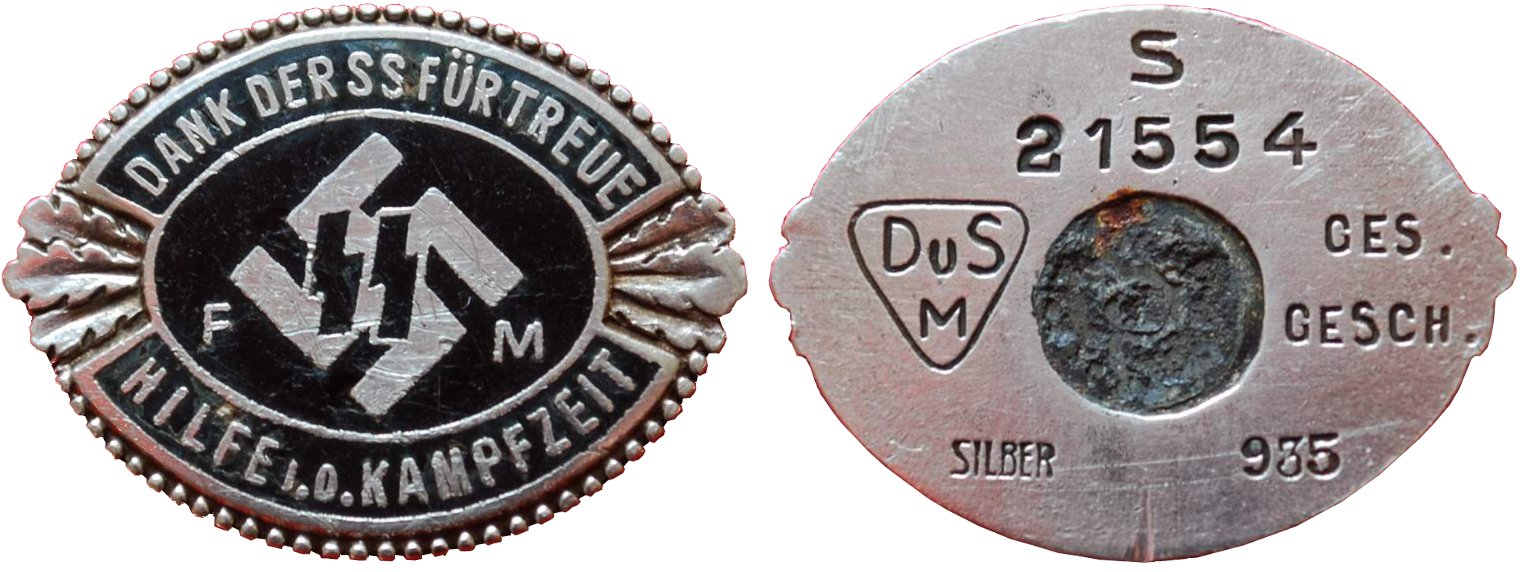
"Fördernden Mitglieds der SS" lapel pin (in silver)

A Förderndes Mitglied der SS (SS-FM; SS Patron Members) was a member of the Allgemeine SS (General SS) who did not take part in active duty, but instead contributed financially to the SS. The SS-FM was organised by the SS Main Economic and Administrative Office, and started in 1926. Members of the SS-FM made monthly payments towards the work of the SS at their local SS headquarters. For people with low income, contributions were low; no minimum contribution was prescribed. Each member was issued with a lapel pin and a receipt book. From April 1934, members also received a monthly magazine - FM-Zeitschrift- which was produced by the SS High Command. By 1939, circulation of FM-Zeitschrift was approximately 365,000, but few copies of the magazine survive today.

== FM SS members ==
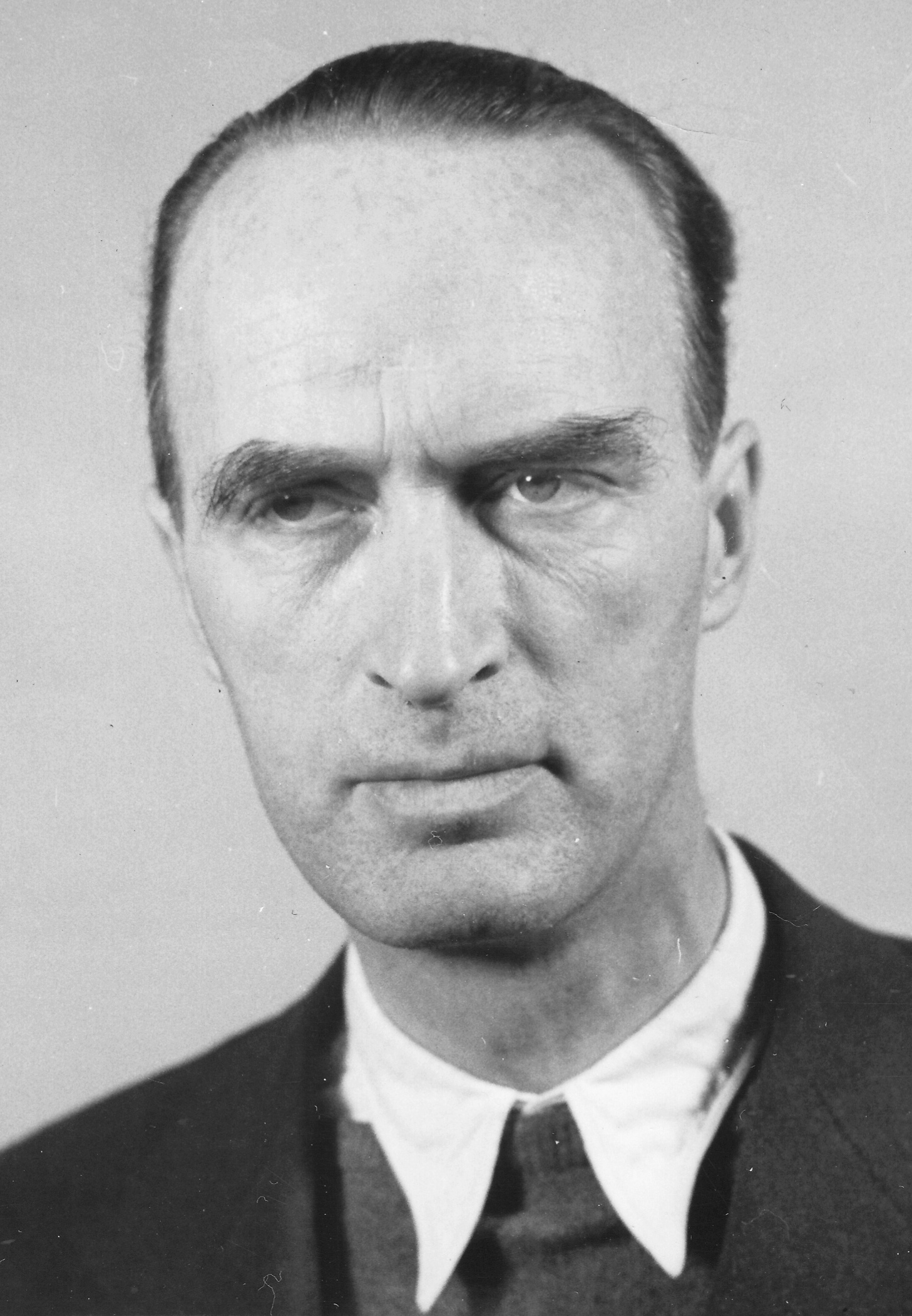
Alfried Krupp von Bohlen und Halbach

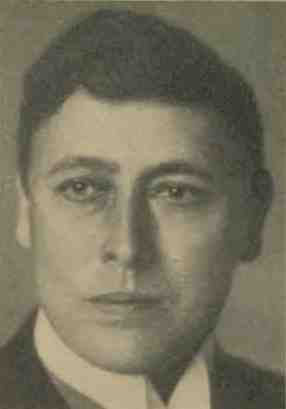
Karl Erb

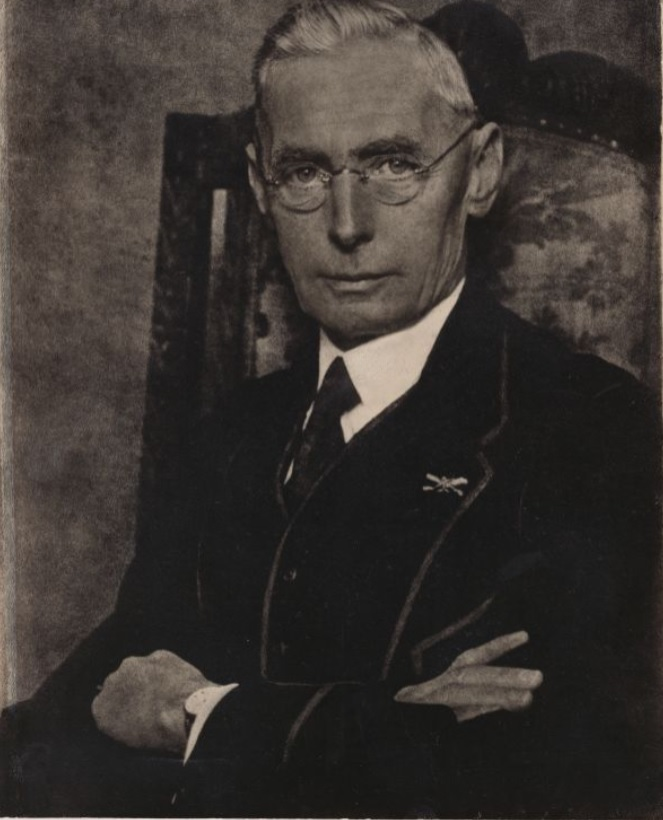
Professor Hans von Haberer-Kremshohenstein

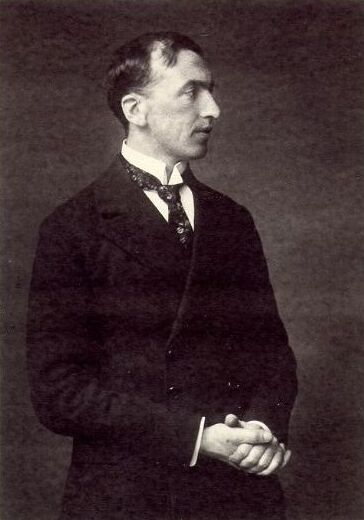
Hans Gerhard Creutzfeldt
