= Julius Patzak =

Austrian opera singer

External audio
- Recordings with Julius Patzak in the Online Archive of the Österreichische Mediathek

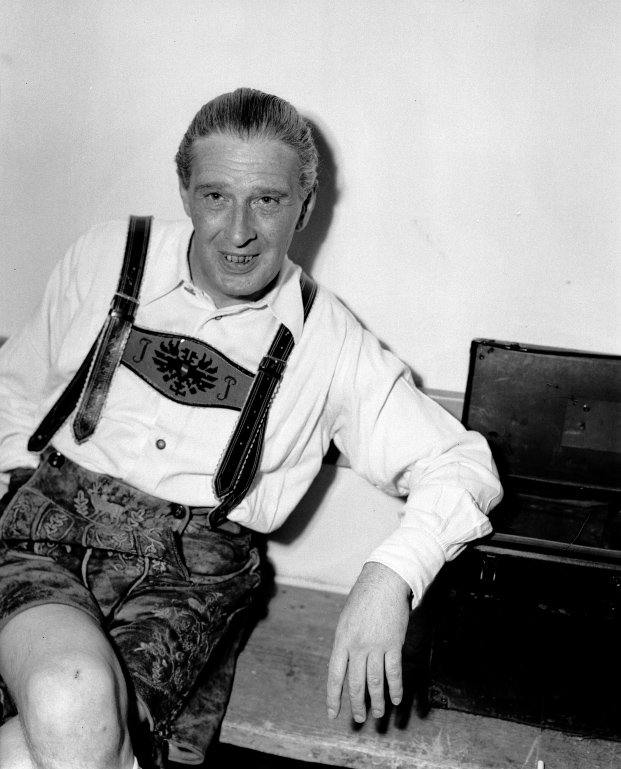
Julius Patzak

Julius Patzak (9 April 1898 – 26 January 1974) was an Austrian tenor distinguished in operatic and concert work. He was particularly noted in Mozart, Beethoven and in early 20th-century German repertoire.

== Biography ==
Julius Patzak was born in Vienna and originally studied conducting. He was also taught composition, by Franz Schmidt, Guido Adler and Eusebius Mandyczewski. It was in 1926 that he decided instead upon a career as a singer, and he made his debut as Radames in Aida at Reichenberg in that year. He sang regularly at the Munich State Opera from 1928 to 1945, and at Vienna from 1946 to 1960. He appeared in London at Covent Garden in 1938 as Tamino in The Magic Flute, alternating with Richard Tauber, and again several times after the war, notably as Florestan in Fidelio. This role and the title role in Hans Pfitzner's opera Palestrina were considered to be among his finest roles. In the latter he was pre-eminent among the followers of his Munich predecessor Karl Erb.

Patzak appeared in a number of operatic premieres, notably Richard Strauss's Friedenstag, Carl Orff's Der Mond and Gottfried von Einem's Dantons Tod.

Patzak sang the role of Gabriel von Eisenstein, a rich banker, in the recording of Die Fledermaus, with Clemens Krauss conducting the Vienna Philharmonic Orchestra, issued by London Records LLP 305.

Although he did not possess the most powerful of voices, it had a distinctive and attractive timbre and was used with such style, intelligence, charm and musicianship, and with such dramatic conviction, as to warrant a very high place among the operatic singers of his time. He was the very effective partner of Kathleen Ferrier in the recording of Mahler's Das Lied von der Erde under Bruno Walter, issued by Decca Records in 1952. Patzak also performed and recorded in the Viennese popular style called Schrammelmusik.

He was awarded the Lilli Lehmann Medal in 1950.

Patzak died on 26 January 1974, at Rottach-Egern in Bavaria, aged 75.

== Sources ==
- Warrack, John, and Ewan West (1992). The Oxford Dictionary of Opera. Oxford: Oxford University Press. ISBN 0-19-869164-5.
