= Luise Willer =

German opera singer

Luise Willer (1888–1970) was a German operatic contralto. She made her professional opera debut in 1910 as Annius in Wolfgang Amadeus Mozart's La clemenza di Tito. She spent most of her career performing at the Bavarian State Opera in Munich. At the Bayreuth Festival, she portrayed Brängane in Tristan und Isolde. She created roles in several world premieres during her career, including Barbara in Erich Wolfgang Korngold's Violanta (1916), Lukrezia in Hans Pfitzner's Palestrina (1917), Graben-Liese in Franz Schreker's Das Spielwerk (1920), and Herzogin in Pfitzner's Das Herz (1931) among others.
