= Violanta =

1916 one-act opera by Erich Wolfgang Korngold

- Opera by Erich Wolfgang Korngold
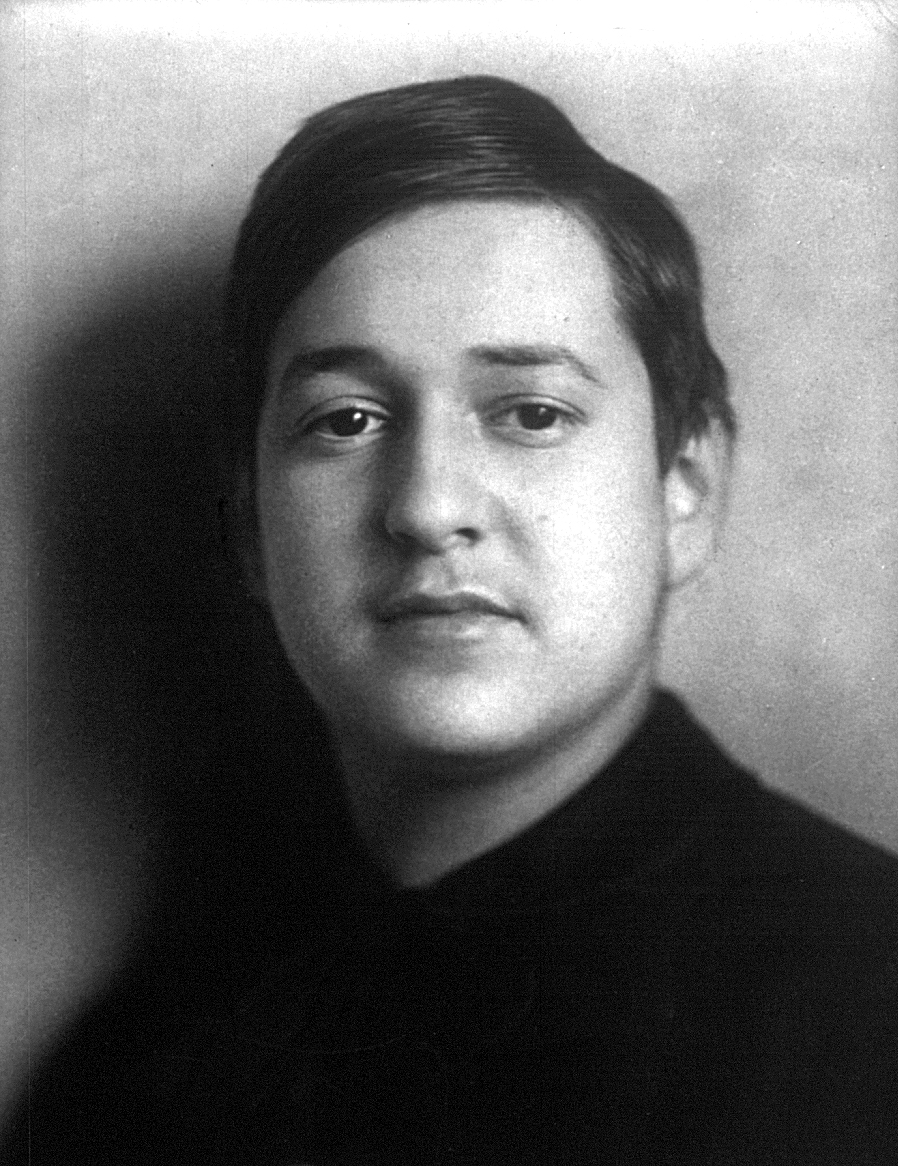
- The composer
- Librettist: Hans Müller-Einigen
- Language: German
- Premiere: 28 March 1916; National Theatre Munich

Violanta, Op. 8, is a one-act opera by Erich Wolfgang Korngold. The libretto is by the Austrian playwright Hans Müller-Einigen. It is Korngold's second opera, written when he was seventeen years old.

== Performance history ==
It was premiered on 28 March 1916 at the National Theatre Munich together with the composer's other one-act opera Der Ring des Polykrates, Op. 7, with Bruno Walter conducting. The North American premiere was given on 5 November 1927 at the Metropolitan Opera in New York City with Maria Jeritza as Violanta, Walter Kirchhoff as Alfonso, Clarence Whitehill as Simone, Angelo Badà as Giovanni, and Artur Bodanzky conducting.

== Roles ==
Roles, voice types, premier cast
Role	Voice type	Premiere cast, 28 March 1916 (Conductor: Bruno Walter)
Simone Trovai, military commander of the Venetian republic	baritone	Friedrich Brodersen
Violanta, his wife	soprano	Emmy Krüger
Alfonso, illegitimate son of the King of Naples	tenor	Franz Gruber
Giovanni Bracca, a painter	tenor	Alfred Bauberger
Bice	soprano	Irene von Fladung
Barbara, Violanta's nurse	contralto	Luise Willer
Mateo	tenor	Paul Kuhn
First soldier	tenor	Fritz Birrenkoven
Second soldier	baritone	
First maid	soprano	
Second maid	mezzo-soprano	

== Synopsis ==
The opera is set in 15th-century Venice, at the house of Simone Trovai, military commander of the Venetian Republic.

On the night of the great Carnival, Simone in vain searches his house for his wife Violanta. Ever since her sister Nerina committed suicide (after having been seduced by Alfonso, the Prince of Naples), she has been bent on vengeance. Simone is about to leave for the Carnival with the painter Giovanni Bracca, when Violanta appears. After dismissing Bracca, she reveals to Simone that she has (anonymously) arranged a meeting with Alfonso in their house, where she wants her husband to murder him. Initially Simone is horrified at this plan, but he finally succumbs to Violanta's promises and threats. The plan is that Violanta will receive Alfonso in her room, and once he is disarmed she will sing the Carnival song as a signal that Simone should enter and murder him.

Alfonso arrives. During their meeting Violanta reveals her true identity and her intention to avenge her sister. However, when Alfonso explains to her the course of his life and talks about his longing for death, Violanta realises that she really loves him and refuses to give the signal. Violanta bemoans her fate, but Alfonso implores her to think only of the present moment: they embrace and sing of the sublimity of pure love.

Their ecstatic bliss is interrupted by Simone who calls out to his wife. The lovers realise that their dream is over, and spurred on by Alfonso Violanta sings the fateful song with hysterical abandon. Simone enters and tries to stab Alfonso, but Violanta interposes herself and is mortally wounded. She dies in Simone's arms.

== Bibliography ==
- Carroll, Brendan. "Korngold's Violanta". The Musical Times 122, no. 1653 (November 1980): 695–98.
- Krebs, Wolfgang. "Dramaturgie der Entgrenzung. Erich Wolfgang Korngolds Operneinakter Violanta", Frankfurter Zeitschrift für Musikwissenschaft 1, no. 1 (1998): 26–39; also doi:10.5450/ejm.1998.1.6090
- Krebs, Wolfgang. Violanta, Erich Wolfgang Korngolds dionysisches Bühnenwerk. Berlin: Rhombos-Verlag, 2014. 158 pp. (excerpt)
- Specht, Richard. Thematischer Führer zu Erich W. Korngold's "Violanta" und "Der Ring des Polykrates". Mainz and Leipzig: B. Schott's Söhne, 1916. iv, 68 pp.

== Recordings ==
- Marek Janowski conductor/Éva Marton/Siegfried Jerusalem/Walter Berry, Herkulessaal, Munich, 1980, BR recording released on CBS and Sony Classical
- Stefan Lano conductor/Senda/Bowers/Wolfgang Schöne, live in Buenos Aires, Oct 12–19, 2010, SoundCloud
- Pinchas Steinberg conductor/Kremer/Reinhardt/Kupfer, filmed in Torino, Jan 21 and 23, 2020, Dynamic
