= Die Vögel (opera) =

Opera in two acts by Walter Braunfels

- Opera by Walter Braunfels
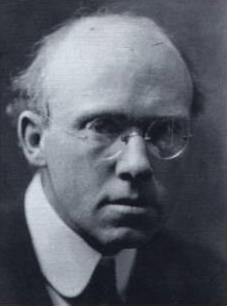
- Walter Braunfels in 1920
- Librettist: Braunfels
- Language: German
- Based on: The Birds by Aristophanes
- Premiere: 30 November 1920; National Theatre Munich

Die Vögel (The Birds), Op. 30, is an opera in a prologue and two acts by Walter Braunfels. The libretto, written by the composer, is a free adaptation of Aristophanes' comedy The Birds which was performed at the Dionysos Theatre in Athens in 414 BC.

== Composition history ==
Composition of the opera started in 1913 and was finished in 1919. The score was published by Universal Edition Vienna in 1920.

== Performance history ==
The opera was first performed on 30 November 1920 at the National Theatre Munich, with Bruno Walter conducting and Maria Ivogün (the Nightingale) and Karl Erb (Good Hope) in the principal roles. This was followed by more than 50 performances in Munich alone the following two years, and by further performances in Berlin, Vienna and Cologne (where Otto Klemperer conducted).

The first post-war staging of the opera took place in Karlsruhe in 1971. Another production was staged in Bremen in 1991, followed by a concert performance in Berlin in December 1994.

Recently, the opera has been given in various opera houses in Europe:

- at the Grand Theatre Geneva in February 2004, with Ulf Schirmer conducting the Orchestre de la Suisse Romande
- at the Teatro Lirico di Cagliari in April/May 2007 (the Italian premiere, conducted by Roberto Abbado)
- at the Konzerthaus Berlin in March 2009 (two concert performances including video-installations, with Lothar Zagrosek conducting the Konzerthausorchester Berlin)

The United States premiere was staged in 2005 at the Spoleto Festival USA in Charleston, South Carolina, with Julius Rudel conducting. It was later performed in April 2009 at the Los Angeles Opera, with James Conlon conducting. The Canadian premiere was given by Pacific Opera Victoria in February, 2023, conducted by Timothy Vernon and staged by Glynis Leshon.

== Roles ==
Role	Voice type	Premiere Cast 30 November 1920 (Conductor: Bruno Walter)
Nachtigall (Nightingale)	high soprano	Maria Ivogün
Hoffegut (Good Hope), human citizen of a big city	tenor	Karl Erb
Ratefreund (Loyal Friend), human citizen of a big city	high bass	
Zaunschlüpfer (Wren)	soprano	
Wiedhopf (Hoopoe), once a human, now King of the Birds	baritone	Friedrich Brodersen
1. Drossel (1st Thrush)	low soprano	
2. Drossel (2nd Thrush)	soprano	
Prometheus	baritone	
Adler (Eagle)	bass	
voice of Zeus	baritone	
Flamingo	tenor	
Rabe (Raven)	bass	
3 swallows, 2 tits, 4 doves, 4 wrynecks, 2 peewits, 3 cuckoos, chorus of birds, voices of the scent of flowers, voices of the winds

== Synopsis ==
=== Prologue ===
The Nightingale welcomes the audience to the realm of the birds, extolling its utopian virtues. Nevertheless, she confesses to an unfulfilled longing within her own soul.

=== Act 1 ===
Good Hope and Loyal Friend, disillusioned with their fellow men, have journeyed to a desolate region in search of the Hoopoe, king of the birds. They encounter the Wren, who is suspicious of humans, but they manage to persuade her to summon her master. Awakened from sleep, the Hoopoe-who had once been a man himself-confronts Good Hope and Loyal Friend, who declare their desire to live among the carefree birds. When the Hoopoe sighs that the birds have no real kingdom to call their own, Good Hope observes that the sky is their domain. The Hoopoe demurs, remarking that the air belongs to all creatures. Loyal Friend has a sudden brainstorm. He proclaims that the birds should build a great city in the clouds, fortified against men below and the gods above. Good Hope is skeptical, but the Hoopoe embraces the scheme wholeheartedly and summons the birds to his side, announcing that two men have arrived with a plan that will benefit the birds. The birds' first reaction is to denounce the men as wicked and treacherous. However, despite a warning from the Eagle, the Hoopoe prevails upon the mob to hear them out. Playing on their emotions, Loyal Friend harks back to a golden age when the birds were revered by men, and incites them to reclaim their lost glory. Galvanized, the birds commit to the scheme hatched by Loyal Friend, even if it means war. Good Hope is caught up in the excitement too, naively envisioning a better world within reach. Emboldened by his success, Loyal Friend demands that the birds honor him as their lord and master, and they willingly acquiesce. Amid much rejoicing, the birds rush off to begin their grand undertaking.

=== Act 2 ===
It is the following night. Good Hope is awakened by the song of the Nightingale. He feels revitalized, intoxicated by her sweet voice. Good Hope entreats the Nightingale to come closer, and asks her to teach him to see the world through her eyes. At first she tells him that he can never understand what it means to live in harmony with the universe, but his declaration of love sways her, and she imparts a kiss to his forehead, granting his desire. The air is filled with the voices of the scent of flowers, and Good Hope succumbs to their enchantment, sinking unconscious to the ground. Daybreak illuminates the citadel in the sky built by the birds. Led by the Hoopoe and Loyal Friend, the birds vaunt their lofty achievement and their imminent dominion over all living things. A wedding procession makes its way through the crowd, led by the Wren, who proudly heralds the arrival of the first newlyweds to enter the great city. Everyone joins the nuptial celebration, which culminates in a ceremonial dance led by two Doves as the bride and groom. The mood is shattered when more birds rush in, clamoring that a mighty creature has broken through the barricades. The stranger enters, heavily cloaked, and the birds cower in fear. The Hoopoe and Loyal Friend challenge the intruder, who announces that he has come as a friend to admonish them; through the grace of Zeus, they have been given a chance to mend their ways and submit to the will of the gods. The birds react defiantly, whereupon the stranger reveals that he is the titan Prometheus, who himself had once rebelled against the gods and had been punished severely. Despite this dire warning and the misgivings voiced by Good Hope and the Hoopoe, Loyal Friend brashly exhorts the birds to wage war against the gods. Suddenly a terrible storm breaks forth, manifesting the wrath of Zeus, and a thunderbolt destroys the citadel of the birds. Chastened, the birds sing a hymn of praise and thanksgiving to Zeus. Loyal Friend emerges from hiding, clearly rattled but putting up a good front. Dismissing the whole adventure among the birds as a foolish lark, he urges Good Hope to return with him to the comforts of home in the city. Good Hope lingers for a moment, reflecting upon his brief encounter with the Nightingale, an experience which will live forever in his heart. As he turns to leave, the call of the Nightingale is heard once more; overwhelmed with emotion, Good Hope sets out on his journey home.

== Instrumentation ==
The orchestral score requires:

- 3 flutes (3rd doubling piccolo), 1 flute behind the scenes, oboe, English horn (doubling oboe 2), 2 clarinets in A, 2 bassoons (2nd doubling contrabassoon);
- 4 horns in E, 2 trumpets in B-flat, 3 trombones, tuba;
- timpani, percussion (2 players), 2 harps, celesta;
- strings (violins I, violins II, violas, violoncellos, double basses).

== Recordings ==
In 1996 Decca released the world premiere recording in their Entartete Musik series. This recording was made in the Jesus-Christus-Kirche in Berlin-Dahlem in December 1994, with Lothar Zagrosek conducting the Deutsches Symphonie-Orchester Berlin. In 2010 Arthausmusik released a DVD recording of a production of Die Vogel at LAOPERA. The Los Angeles Opera performances on April 23 and 26, 2009, conducted by James Conlon were used, with soloists Desirée Rancatore, Brandon Jovanovich and James Johnson, directed by Tresnjak. DVD catalogue No.NTSC 101 529 Arthaus Musik GmbH.
