= Palestrina (opera) =

Opera by Hans Pfitzner

- Musikalische Legende (Opera) by Hans Pfitzner
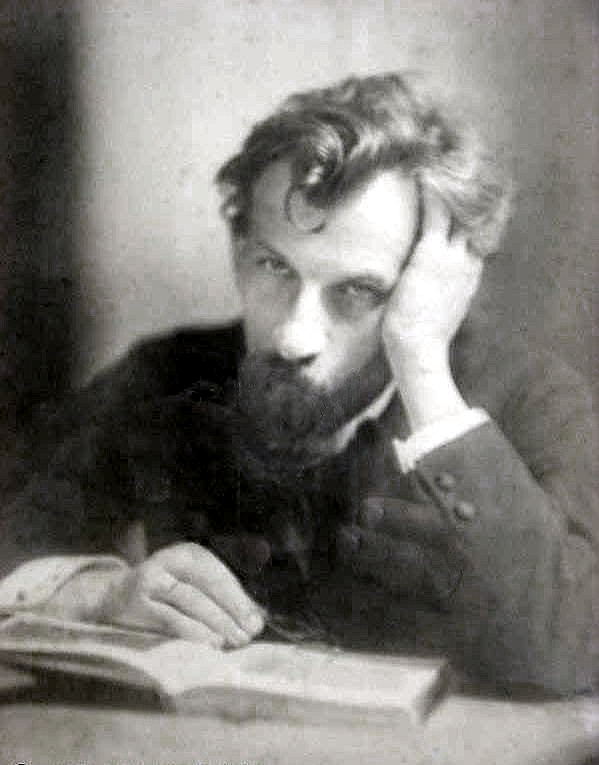
- Pfitzner, by Wanda von Debschitz-Kunowski, ca 1910
- Librettist: Hans Pfitzner
- Language: German
- Premiere: 12 June 1917; Prinzregententheater, Munich

Palestrina is an opera by the German composer Hans Pfitzner, first performed in 1917. The composer referred to it as a Musikalische Legende (musical legend), and wrote the libretto himself, based on a legend about the Renaissance musician Giovanni Pierluigi da Palestrina, who saves the art of contrapuntal music (polyphony) for the Church in the sixteenth century through his composition of the Missa Papae Marcelli. The wider context is that of the European Reformation and the role of music in relation to it. The character of Cardinal Borromeo is depicted, and a General Congress of the Council of Trent is the centrepiece of act 2.

The conductor of the premiere was Bruno Walter. On 16 February 1962, the day before he died, Walter ended his last letter with: "Despite all the dark experiences of today I am still confident that Palestrina will remain. The work has all the elements of immortality".

== Critical appreciation ==
Claire Taylor-Jay has discussed Pfitzner's depiction of the political relationship between Palestrina and the Council of Trent in the light of several German "artist-operas" such as Paul Hindemith's Mathis der Maler. Mosco Carner has written on Pfitzner's own expression of the role of spontaneous inspiration in composition, as expressed in Palestrina. Several scholarly articles have delved into Pfitzner's musical and ideological conservatism, as expressed in this opera. Gottfried Scholz has written of Pfitzner's depiction of the title character as a surrogate for himself. Karen Painter has discussed commentary on the opera in Nazi Germany.

== Performance history ==
The work was first performed at the Prinzregententheater, Munich, on 12 June 1917. The title role was created by the tenor Karl Erb. Pfitzner wrote in his copy of the score:

Ich erachte es als einen der seltenen Glücksumstände in meinem Künstlerleben, dass mein grösstes Werk bei seinem ersten Erscheinen in der Welt für seine Haupt- und Titelrolle einen solch idealen Vertreter gefunden hat, wie Sie, lieber Karl Erb es sind. Ihr Name ist mit diesem Stück deutscher Kunst für alle Zeiten ruhmreich verbunden.

[I consider it as one of the very occasional fortunate circumstances in my life as an artist, that my greatest work at its first appearance in the world has found for its chief and title role such an ideal interpreter as you, dear Karl Erb, are. Your name is for all time praiseworthily united with this piece of German art.]

In the original performances, Maria Ivogün (later wife of Karl Erb) sang the role of Ighino, Fritz Feinhals and Emil Schipper sang Borromeo, Willi Birrenkoven was Budoja, and Bruno Walter conducted. More recently the role of Palestrina has been played by Julius Patzak, a successor to the style of tenor singing developed or maintained by Karl Erb.

Palestrina was Pfitzner's most successful opera and is still regularly performed in German-speaking countries, though revivals abroad are rarer. The first UK performance was a semi-professional production in 1981 at Abbey Opera, and the first fully professional UK production was at the Royal Opera House, Covent Garden, in 1997.

== Main roles ==
Roles, voice types, premiere cast
Role	Voice type	Premiere cast, 12 June 1917 Conductor: Bruno Walter
Giovanni Pierluigi da Palestrina	tenor	Karl Erb
Lukrezia, his wife, recently died	contralto	Luise Willer
Ighino, his son	soprano	Maria Ivogün
Silla, his pupil	mezzo-soprano	Emmy Krüger
Bernardo Novagerio, cardinal legate	tenor	Paul Kuhn
Bishop of Budoja	tenor	Willi Birrenkoven
Carlo Borromeo, a Roman cardinal	baritone	Fritz Feinhals
Giovanni Morone, cardinal legate	baritone	Friedrich Brodersen
Count Luna, ambassador of the King of Spain	baritone	Alfons Gustav Schützendorf
Pope Pius IV	bass	Paul Bender
Bishop Ercole Severolus, Master of Ceremonies of the Council of Trent	bass-baritone	Alfred Bauerberger
Cardinal Christoph Madruscht, Prince Bishop of Trent	bass	Max Gillman
Theophilus, Bishop of Imola	tenor	
The Cardinal of Lorraine	bass	
Abdisu, Patriarch of Assyria	tenor	
Anton Brus von Müglitz, Archbishop of Prague	bass	
Avosmediano, Bishop of Cadiz	bass-baritone	

== Synopsis ==
=== Act 1 ===
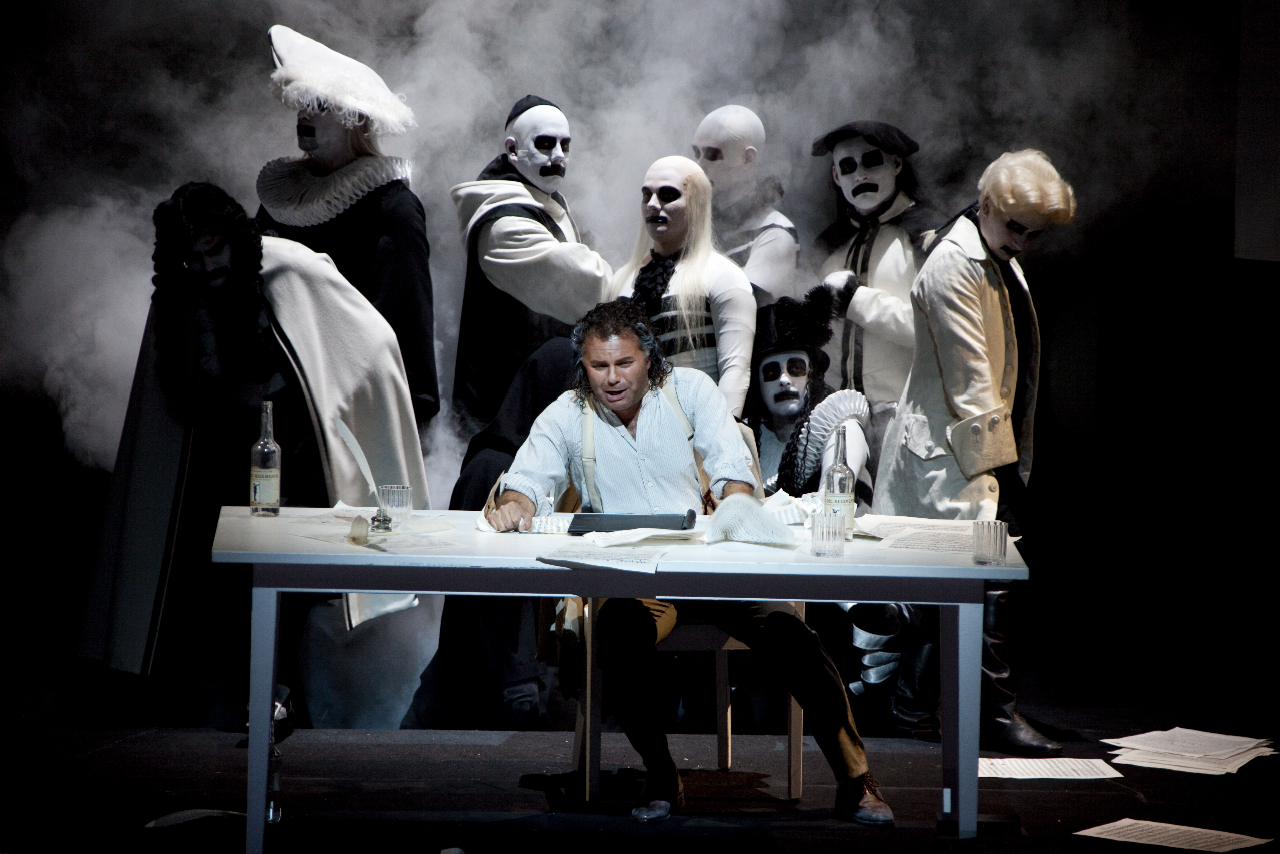
Act 1, scene 5 (Roberto Saccà, Hamburg State Opera 2011)

A room in Palestrina's house, Rome, around 1560
(Scene 1) Palestrina's student Silla is trying over a secular lyric he has written, and planning to make a new life in Florence, where he hopes to find his own voice as a singer and songwriter. Rome clings to its old-fashioned polyphony as closely as it defends its religion. (2) Ighino and Silla discuss their singing: Silla thinks a singer should stand alone, but Ighino thinks that real strength lies subordinating the individual self to the larger complex idea. He is sad because his father has lost heart: fame made others jealous, his marriage led the Pope to dismiss him, and his wife died knowing this. Since then Palestrina has written nothing. Silla sings to him his new song. (3) Cardinal Borromeo is visiting Palestrina to explain that, because of growing secularism, the Pope plans to banish polyphony from the Mass and other offices, to burn the polyphonic masterpieces, and to revert entirely to the Gregorian chant. Emperor Ferdinand I hopes that a new polyphonic Mass can be written which will appease his fears. Borromeo wants Palestrina to undertake this, but, lacking the spirit, he refuses, and Borromeo leaves in anger. (4) Palestrina ponders his loss of faith and the weakness of love. In his despair, spirits of the great music-masters of previous ages appear and surround him. (5) The spirits tell Palestrina he belongs to their elect and must fulfil the task. He protests that in the modern consciousness, art cannot thrive. The spirits reply that this is his earthly mission: he must bring the light to his generation. They vanish. (6) In the darkness of his room angels begin to appear, singing the Mass, and his dead wife's spirit approaches. Not seeing them, Palestrina feels a surge of joy as the walls and ceiling open up to celestial light full of glory and angels, who sing the Gloria. In a creative transport Palestrina's pen is inspired, and as it all fades, he sinks exhausted to sleep, surrounded by sheets of music strewn all around. (7) Silla and Ighino enter while he sleeps, and find the music: it is a complete Mass, written in one night. Ighino rejoices, but Silla is sceptical.

=== Act 2 ===
The Great Hall in Cardinal Madruscht's Palace in Trent
(Scene 1) Bishop Severolus and the Papal legate Novagerio prepare the hall for the final General Congress of the Council of Trent. The Cardinal of Lorraine (who has reached compromise with the Pope) and Count Luna, representative of the King of Spain (favouring Protestantism) must be seated equally and without precedence. (2) Cardinal Madruscht and Novagerio discuss the coming decision while awaiting the delegates, and they greet Borromeo. (3) While delegates arrive, Borromeo and Novagerio talk politics: Emperor Ferdinand and his son Maximilian plan to have dominion of the Catholic world (including Germany) from the throne of Spain, in union with the Kingship of Rome, which is offered to Maximilian even though he is secretly inclined to Lutheranism. But the Pope will preserve dogma by the interpretation of imperial decrees. Borromeo explains that Palestrina has refused the commission for the new polyphonic Mass. Novagerio insists that Palestrina must be forced into subordination, or be crushed. (4) Cardinal Madruscht deplores Lorraine's compromise with Rome, and urges the Cardinal of Prague to stand fast for doctrinal Reforms. The Spanish arrive and look scornfully at the Italians and the Bishop of Budoja. Morone, the other papal legate, arrives and the Council begins. (5) Morone opens the meeting hoping for unity of purpose between Emperor, Pope and Princes. The question of the polyphonic Mass is raised, but Borromeo tells them it is unfinished. The issue of the vernacular Mass and breviary arises, but then Count Luna and Cardinal of Lorraine dispute precedence, and Budoja disrupts proceedings to deflect Count Luna's case. Chaos breaks out: the meeting is adjourned till the afternoon, when everything must be resolved. The delegates disperse. (6) Lorraine protests to Morone that he should have precedence, but Morone is angry that he has provoked Count Luna. Novagerio appeals to Lorraine to consider the interests of the Pope. Badoja makes himself objectionable. (7) The Spanish servants, and a group of German and Italian servants, shout abuse at each other and a battle with daggers ensues. Cardinal Madruscht appears with a troop of soldiers, and commands them to shoot to kill. A volley is fired, and many fall dead and wounded: all the survivors are seized and carried off for torture.

=== Act 3 ===
Palestrina's house in Rome, as in the First Act.
(Scene 1) Palestrina, aged and very tired, waits in his room with Ighino and some choristers. Borromeo imprisoned him for refusing the commission, but Ighino handed the music of the Mass over to save his father from the hangman. Now it is being sung before the Pope. Ighino begs his father to reawaken to life and to embrace the son who loves him. Suddenly the voices of singers from the Papal chapel are heard from the street singing 'Evviva Palestrina, the Saviour of Music!' (2) Papal singers come into the room, saying how greatly the Mass has pleased everyone. Pope Pius IV himself enters with eight Cardinals (including Borromeo), Palestrina kneels, and the Pope asks him to return and lead the Sistine Choir until the end of his days. Then they leave, but Borromeo remains and prostrates himself in tears, begging Palestrina's forgiveness. Palestrina raises him up, kisses him on the cheek and embraces him, for both are shattered vessels that must be filled with the breath of love. Borromeo, much chastened, departs: Ighino embraces his father, and asks if he will now be happy. Silla has gone to Florence, but Ighino will remain: in joy the boy rushes out into the street. Palestrina looks at his wife's portrait, and with an expression of devotion to God sits at the organ and begins to play.

== Recordings ==
- (Studio recording, Munich, 1973), Deutsche Grammophon 427 417-2 (CD reissue): Nicolai Gedda, Karl Ridderbusch, Bernd Weikl, Herbert Steinbach, Dietrich Fischer-Dieskau, Victor von Halem, John van Kesteren, Peter Meven, Hermann Prey, Friedrich Lenz, Adalbert Kraus, Franz Mazura, Helen Donath, Brigitte Fassbaender, Gerd Nienstedt; Bavarian Radio Chorus; Tölzer Knabenchor; Bavarian Radio Symphony Orchestra, Rafael Kubelík, conductor
- (Live off-air performance 1951), Opera D'Oro 3MCD 975.170 (CD reissue): Julius Patzak, Hans Hotter, Ferdinand Frantz, Georg Wieter, Franz Klarwein, Katja Sabo, Kathe Neuburg, Bavarian State Opera Chorus and Orchestra (Prinzregententheater), Robert Heger, conductor
- (Studio recording, Cologne 1952), Mytho Records 3CD 021.H060 (CD reissue): Julius Patzak, Hans Hotter, Dietrich Fischer-Dieskau, Gottlob Frick, Anny Schlemm, Richard Kraus, conductor
- (Live recording, Berlin 1986, 1988), Berlin Classics 3CD 0310001: Peter Schreier, Siegfried Lorenz, Ekkehard Wlaschiha, Fritz Hübner, Hans-Joachim Ketelsen, Peter-Jürgen Schmitd, Carola Nossek, Rosemarie Lang; Chorus of the Berlin State Opera; Staatskapelle Berlin; Otmar Suitner, conductor

== Bibliography ==
- Viking Opera Guide edited by Amanda Holden (Viking, 1993)
- M. Müller-Gögler, Karl Erb, Das Leben eines Sängers (Verlag Franz Huber, Offenburg c. 1948).
- H. Rosenthal and J. Warrack, The Concise Oxford Dictionary of Opera (London 1974).
- M. Scott, The Record of Singing to 1914 (Duckworth, London 1977).
