= Leo Feld =

Austrian librettist, dramaturge, stage director, translator and writer

Leo Feld (14 February 1869, Augsburg - 5 September 1924 Florence) was an Austrian librettist, dramaturge, stage director, and writer. He also worked as a translator for publishing companies, and was notably responsible for translating many of Charles Dickens' English language works for their first German language publications.

Born with the name Leo Hirschfeld in Augsburg, he was the younger brother of librettist Victor Léon and educator Eugenie Hirschfeld. He moved with his family to Vienna in 1875 and was educated at the University of Vienna; earning a doctorate in philosophy in 1892. He began contributing articles to various Vienna based magazines while a college student. Two of his mentors in writing were Jakob Julius David and Hermann Bahr. His first play was awarded the Bauernfeld-Preis in the late 1890s. In 1900 he lived for some months in Berlin where he was actively involved the Überbrettl literary society. He then worked as a dramaturge and stage director in Brunswick. One of his closest friends was the actor Josef Kainz. He wrote opera libretti for composers Eugen d'Albert, Erich Wolfgang Korngold, and Alexander von Zemlinsky. He died in Florence.

== Works (selection) ==
The Rags (1898) Miss Teacher (folk play) (1905) The Stone of Pisa (1906) The Big Name (folk play) (1909) The Dombacher (1917) The Ornate Lattice (1923) Walk in the Fog (1925)

== Sources ==
- "Leo Feld", Österreichisches Biographisches Lexikon 1815–1950
