= Friedrich Brodersen =

German opera singer

Friedrich Brodersen (1 December 1873 - 19 March 1926) was a German operatic baritone. Born in Bad Boll, he studied singing with Heinrich Bertram. He made his professional opera debut in 1900. He created roles in several world premieres during his career, including Pantalone in Ermanno Wolf-Ferrari's Le donne curiose (1903), Count Gil in Wolf-Ferrari's Il segreto di Susanna (1909), Simone Trovai in Erich Wolfgang Korngold's Violanta (1916), Morone in Hans Pfitzner's Palestrina (1917), Sang in Heinrich Rohr's Das Vaterunser, and roles in Paul von Klenau's Sulamith (1913), and Walter Braunfels's Die Vögel (1920).
