= Bruno Walter =

German-born conductor, pianist, and composer (1876–1962)

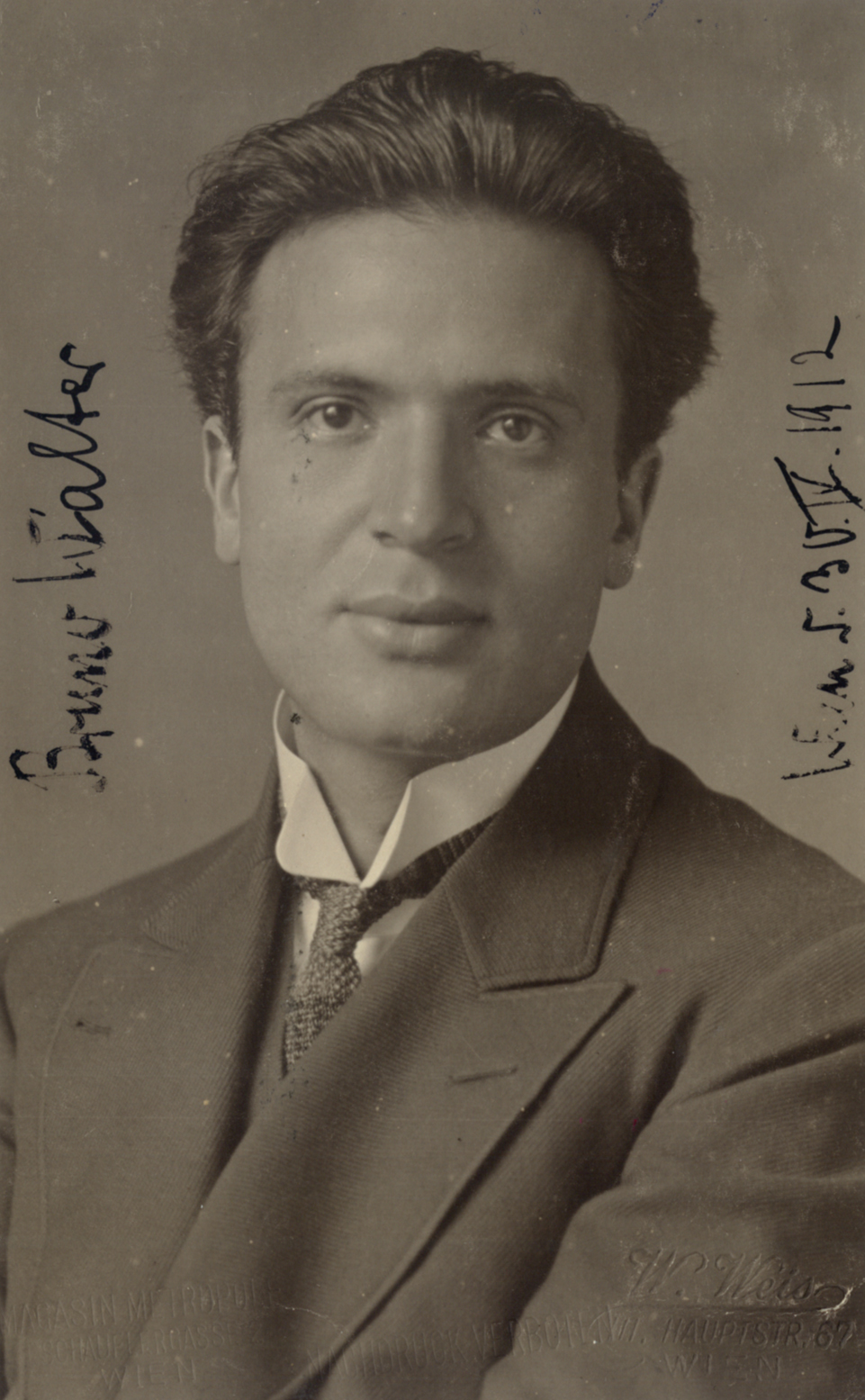
- Walter, Vienna, 1912
- Born: Bruno Schlesinger; September 15, 1876; Berlin, Kingdom of Prussia, German Empire
- Died: February 17, 1962 (aged 85); Beverly Hills, California, U.S.
- Occupations: Composer, conductor, pianist

Bruno Walter (born Bruno Schlesinger, September 15, 1876 – February 17, 1962) was a German-born conductor, pianist, and composer. Born in Berlin, he left Nazi Germany in 1933. After the Anschluss of Austria in March 1938, he first emigrated to Lugano. Later in 1938, was naturalised as a French citizen in 1938. In November 1939, he emigrated to the United States. He worked closely with Gustav Mahler, conducting the premieres of his Ninth Symphony and Das Lied von der Erde. He held major positions with the Leipzig Gewandhaus Orchestra, New York Philharmonic, Concertgebouw Orchestra, Salzburg Festival, Vienna State Opera, Bavarian State Opera, Staatsoper Unter den Linden and Deutsche Oper Berlin, among others. He is known for making recordings of historical and artistic significance, and is widely considered to be one of the great conductors of the 20th century.

== Biography ==
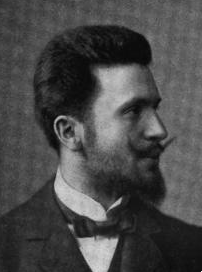
The young Bruno Walter

=== Early life ===
Born near Alexanderplatz in Berlin to a middle-class Jewish family, he began his musical education at the Stern Conservatory at the age of eight, making his first public appearance as a pianist when he was nine; he performed a concerto movement with the Berlin Philharmonic in 1889 and a full concerto with them in February 1890. He studied composition at Stern with Robert Radecke, and remained active as a composer until about 1910 (see list of compositions below). But it was hearing a concert in 1889 by the Berlin Philharmonic led by Hans von Bülow, he wrote, that "decided my future. Now I knew what I was meant for. No musical activity but that of an orchestral conductor could any longer be considered by me." He made his conducting début at the Cologne Opera with Albert Lortzing's Der Waffenschmied in 1894. Later that year he left for the Hamburg Opera to work as a chorus director. There he first met and worked with Gustav Mahler, whom he revered and with whose music he later became strongly identified.

=== Conducting ===
In 1896, he was appointed Kapellmeister of the Stadttheater (Wrocław Opera) in Breslau, on the strength of a recommendation from Mahler to the theater's director, Theodor Löwe. However, Löwe required that before taking up this position the young conductor change his last name from Schlesinger—which literally means Silesian—"because of its frequent occurrence in the capital of Silesia". In a letter to his brother, paraphrased by biographers Erik Ryding and Rebecca Pechefsky, Walter said that he had "suggested several names, which Mahler wrote down and gave to Löwe, who returned the contract with the name Bruno Walter". These biographers add that Walter wrote to his parents that he found that "having to change his name was 'terrible'". They report that Mahler and his sisters "pressed" Walter to make the change of name, and add that contrary to occasional unsubstantiated reports, it "is unknown" whether Löwe's stipulation had anything to do with a desire to conceal Walter's Jewish origins.

In 1897, Walter became chief conductor at the municipal opera in Pressburg (now Bratislava). He found the town provincial and depressing, and in 1898 took the position of chief conductor of the Riga Opera, Russian Empire. While there, he converted to Christianity, probably Roman Catholicism. In 1899 Walter was appointed music director of the Temeswar, Austria-Hungary (now Timișoara, Romania) Opera, the current Banatul Philharmonic of Timișoara. Walter then returned in 1900 to Berlin, where he assumed the post of Royal Prussian Conductor at the Staatsoper Unter den Linden, succeeding Franz Schalk; his colleagues there included Richard Strauss and Karl Muck. While in Berlin he also conducted the premiere of Der arme Heinrich by Hans Pfitzner, who became a lifelong friend.

In 1901, Walter accepted Mahler's invitation to be his assistant at the Court Opera in Vienna. Walter led Verdi's Aida at his debut. In 1907 he was elected by the Vienna Philharmonic to conduct its Nicolai Concert. In 1910, he helped Mahler select and coach solo singers for the premiere of Mahler's Symphony No. 8. In the following years Walter's conducting reputation soared as he was invited to conduct across Europe—in Prague, in London where in 1910 he conducted Tristan und Isolde and Ethel Smyth's The Wreckers at Covent Garden, and in Rome.
When Mahler died on May 18, 1911, Walter was at his deathbed. On June 6, he wrote to his sister that he was to conduct the premiere of Mahler's Das Lied von der Erde; he did so in Munich on November 20, 1911, in the first half of an all-Mahler concert (the second half contained Mahler's Symphony No. 2). On June 26, 1912, he led the Vienna Philharmonic in the world premiere of Mahler's Symphony No. 9.

=== Munich ===
Although Walter became an Austrian citizen in 1911, he left Vienna in 1913 to become the Royal Bavarian music director and general music director of the Bavarian State Opera in Munich. While there, argue Erik Ryding and Rebecca Pechefsky, "Walter's contribution to the history of Wagner performance [was] more significant than many realize. The Bayreuth Festival was suspended after 1914 and resumed only in 1924. During those nine years, Munich was the centre of authentic Wagner performance; its Prinzregenttheather was closely patterned after the Bayreuth Festspielhaus, and its National Theatre had seen the world premieres of Das Rheingold, Die Walküre, and Tristan und Isolde. Walter was the city's music director for most of this period, and he presided over most of the Wagnerian repertoire."

In January 1914, Walter conducted his first concert in Moscow. During the First World War he remained actively involved in conducting, giving premieres of Erich Wolfgang Korngold's Violanta and Der Ring des Polykrates as well as Hans Pfitzner's Palestrina. In 1920, he conducted the premiere of Walter Braunfels' Die Vögel.

However, Walter's most significant achievement while Director in Munich was his bond with Mozart: "My greatest artistic gain in Munich was the increased depth of my relation to Mozart...I recognized in Mozart the Shakespeare of the opera...With him, everything was dramatically true: nobility as well as baseness, kindness as well as malice, wisdom as well as stupidity, and he turned all truth in beauty." [Walter: Theme and Variations, pg. 217]

In Munich, Walter was a good friend of Cardinal Eugenio Pacelli (later Pope Pius XII). Walter's close friendship with Thomas Mann seems to have begun in Munich by 1914.

=== United States ===
Walter ended his Munich appointment in 1922 (being succeeded by Hans Knappertsbusch) and left for New York in 1923, working with the New York Symphony Orchestra in Carnegie Hall; he later conducted in Detroit, Minnesota and Boston.

=== Berlin, Leipzig, Vienna ===
Back in Europe, Walter made his debuts with both the Leipzig Gewandhaus Orchestra and the Royal Concertgebouw Orchestra in 1923, and was music director of the Deutsche Oper Berlin (Städtische Oper) from 1925 to 1929. He made his debut at La Scala in 1926, and was chief conductor of the German seasons at Covent Garden in London from 1924 to 1931.

Walter served as principal conductor of the Leipzig Gewandhaus Orchestra from 1929 until March 1933, when his tenure was cut short by the new Nazi government, as detailed below.

In speeches in the late 1920s, Nazi leader Adolf Hitler had complained bitterly about the presence of Jewish conductors at the Berlin opera, and mentioned Walter a number of times, adding to Walter's name the words "alias Schlesinger." When the Nazi regime took power, it undertook a systematic process of barring Jews from artistic life.

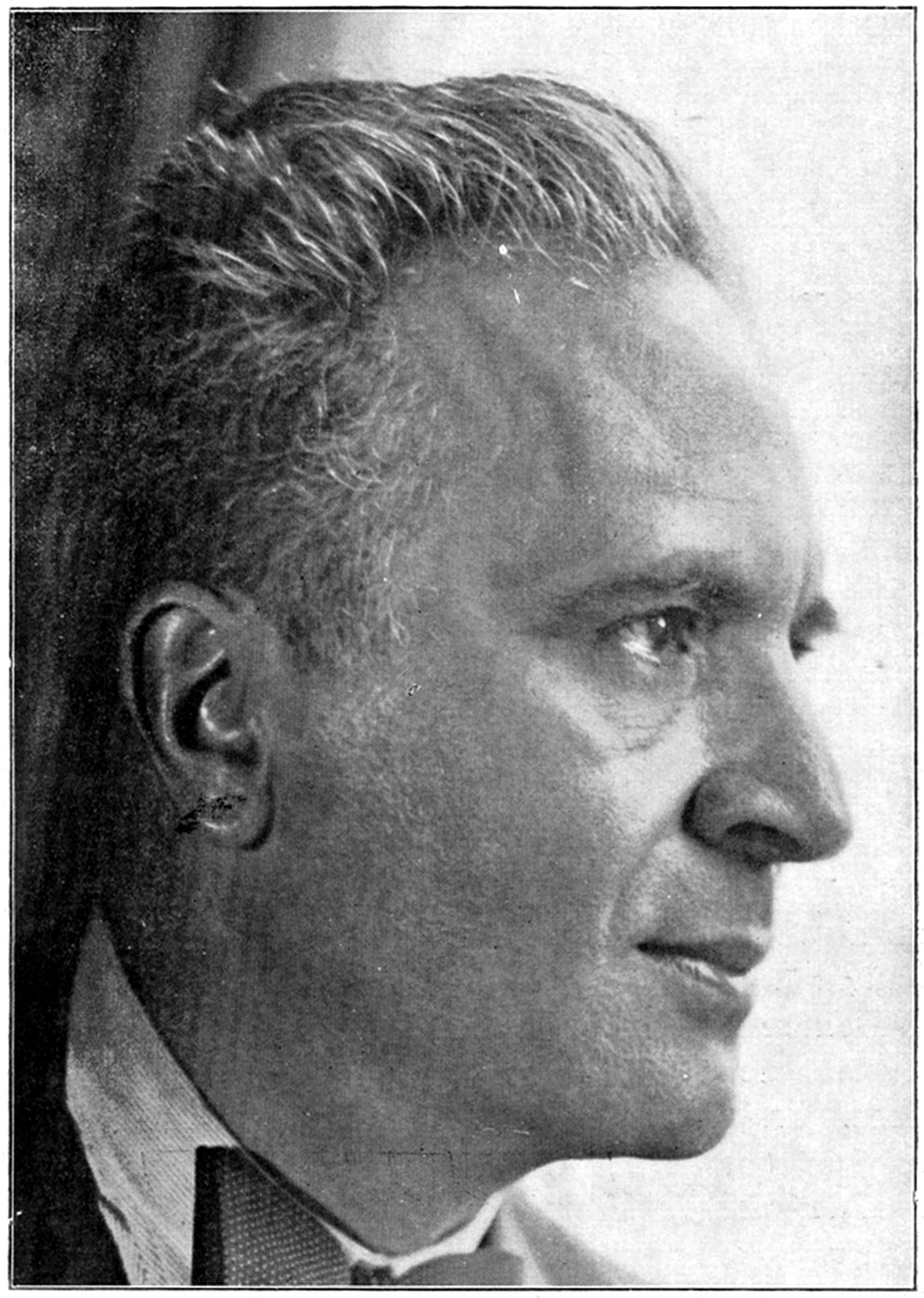
Bruno Walter, 1937

As reported by biographers Erik Ryding and Rebecca Pechefsky, when Hitler became Reichskanzler on 30 January 1933, Walter was conducting in New York, but the next month sailed back to Leipzig planning to conduct his previously scheduled concerts with the Gewandhaus Orchestra in March. However, Leipzig's chief of police informed management that he would cancel the concerts if Walter was to conduct them. Management resisted and Walter led rehearsals, but on the day that the first concert was to take place, the police, "in the name of the Saxon ministry of the interior," forbade the dress rehearsal and the concerts; Walter left Leipzig. Walter was then scheduled to conduct the Berlin Philharmonic on March 20, but its management was warned by Joseph Goebbels that "unpleasant demonstrations" might occur at the concert, and the Propaganda Ministry clarified this by saying that there would be violence in the hall. Hearing of this, Walter chose to withdraw, saying to management, "Then I have no further business here." The concert in the end was conducted by Richard Strauss. Walter later wrote, "The composer of Ein Heldenleben ["A Hero's Life"] actually declared himself ready to conduct in place of a forcibly removed colleague." A concert that Walter was scheduled to lead in Frankfurt was also cancelled. Walter left Germany and was not to conduct there again until after the war.

External audio
- You may listen to Bruno Walter conducting the Vienna Philharmonic Orchestra in Johannes Brahms' Symphony No. 3 in F major Opus 90 in 1936 here on archive.org

Austria became his main center of activity for the next several years. He and his family moved to Vienna, where he regularly conducted the Vienna Philharmonic—with whom he made a number of momentous recordings during this period—and at the Salzburg Festival. In 1936 he accepted an offer to be Artistic Director of the Vienna State Opera, where he occupied the same office that had once been Mahler's. He was also appointed Permanent Guest Conductor (eerste dirigent) of the Amsterdam Concertgebouw Orchestra from 1934 to 1939, and made guest appearances such as in annual concerts with the New York Philharmonic from 1932 to 1936. When Nazi Germany annexed Austria – the Anschluss – in March 1938, Walter was in the Netherlands conducting the Concertgebouw Orchestra. His elder daughter Lotte was in Vienna at the time and was arrested by the Nazis; Walter was able to use his influence to free her. He also used his influence to find safe quarters in Scandinavia for his brother and sister during the war.

During his time in Vienna, Walter "he developed a painful 'professional cramp' in his left arm that prevented him from conducting and playing the piano.... Walter consulted all kinds of specialists ... nothing helped. Finally, as a psychological element was suspected, Walter decided to consult [Sigmund] Freud, probably on the advice of his friend Max Graf". The cramp did not disappear under Freud's treatment, but, "[l]ittle by little, adapting his conducting to his physical handicap, Bruno Walter ended up regaining full use of his arm. He never had a problem again."

Walter's daughter Marguerite "Gretel" (born 1906) was murdered on August 21, 1939, by her husband Robert Neppach, who then killed himself; his motive was jealousy over her growing relationship with the Italian bass singer Ezio Pinza. Walter's wife Elsa, née Korneck (born in 1871) fell into a permanent depression and died in 1945, and Walter blamed himself for the tragedy, as his daughter had met Pinza only because Walter had made special efforts to hire him to sing the role of Don Giovanni.

=== Return to the United States ===
Bruno Walter conducting (photo with dedication from 1952)

On September 1, 1939, the Wehrmacht began (on orders of Hitler) the Invasion of Poland. World War II began. On November 1, 1939, Walter set sail for the United States, which became his permanent home. He settled in Beverly Hills, California, where his many expatriate neighbors included Thomas Mann.

While Walter had many influences within music, in his Of Music and Making (1957) he notes a profound influence from the philosopher Rudolf Steiner. He notes, "In old age I have had the good fortune to be initiated into the world of anthroposophy and during the past few years to make a profound study of the teachings of Rudolf Steiner. Here we see alive and in operation that deliverance of which Friedrich Hölderlin speaks; its blessing has flowed over me, and so this book is the confession of belief in anthroposophy. There is no part of my inward life that has not had new light shed upon it, or been stimulated, by the lofty teachings of Rudolf Steiner ... I am profoundly grateful for having been so boundlessly enriched ... It is glorious to become a learner again at my time of life. I have a sense of the rejuvenation of my whole being which gives strength and renewal to my musicianship, even to my music-making."

External audio
- You may listen to Bruno Walter conducting the New York Philharmonic in: Wolfgang Amadeus Mozart's Symphony No. 40 in G minor Richard Strauss' tone poem Don Juan in E major, Op. 20 with commentary in 1953 here on archive.org

During his years in the United States, Walter worked with many famous American orchestras. In December 1942, he was offered the music directorship of the New York Philharmonic, but declined, citing his age; then in February 1947, after the resignation of Artur Rodzinski, he accepted the position but changed the title to "Music Adviser" (he resigned in 1949). Among other orchestras he worked with were the Chicago Symphony Orchestra, the Los Angeles Philharmonic, the NBC Symphony Orchestra, and the Philadelphia Orchestra. From 1946 onwards, he made numerous trips back to Europe, becoming an important musical figure in the early years of the Edinburgh Festival and in Salzburg, Vienna and Munich. He also coached & accompanied Kathleen Ferrier in London throughout the post war period until her premature death in 1953 and was an ardent fan of her singing. In September 1950 he returned to Berlin for the first time since the aborted concert of 1933; he conducted the Berlin Philharmonic in a program of Beethoven, Mozart, Richard Strauss, and Brahms, and "gave a lecture for the students of the Municipal Conservatory – formerly his old school, the Stern Conservatory – at the students' request". His late life was marked by stereo recordings with the Columbia Symphony Orchestra, an ensemble of professional musicians assembled by Columbia Records for recordings. He made his last live concert appearance on December 4, 1960, with the Los Angeles Philharmonic and pianist Van Cliburn. His last recording was a series of Mozart overtures with the Columbia Symphony Orchestra at the end of March in 1961.

=== Death ===
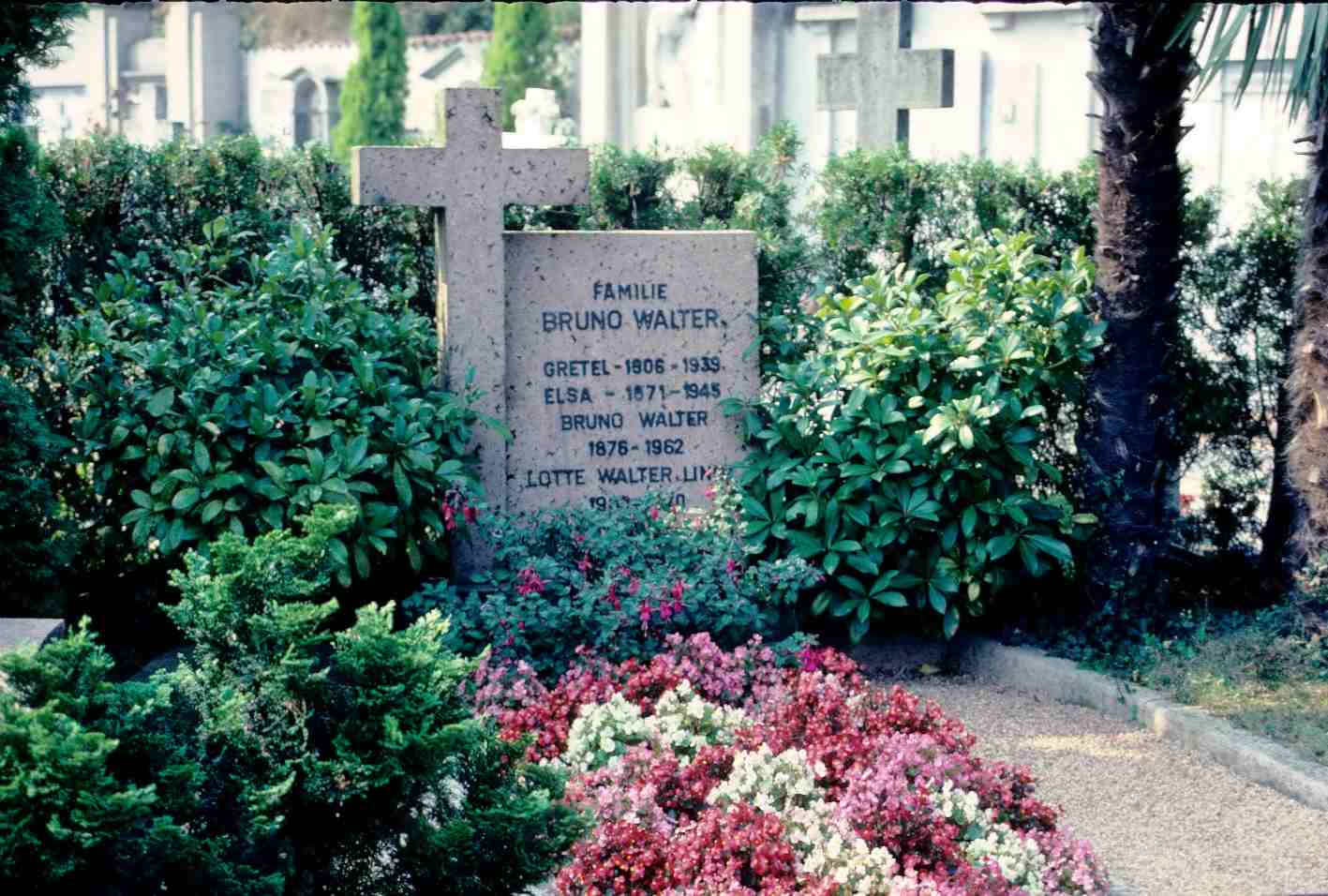
The family grave in 1998.

Bruno Walter died of a heart attack in his Beverly Hills home in February 1962. His final resting place is in the cemetery of Gentilino near Lugano in the Canton of Ticino, Switzerland, in the same grave where his wife and their daughter Gretel had already been buried. Their daughter Lotte (1903–1970) was buried there as well.

== Work ==
=== Recordings ===
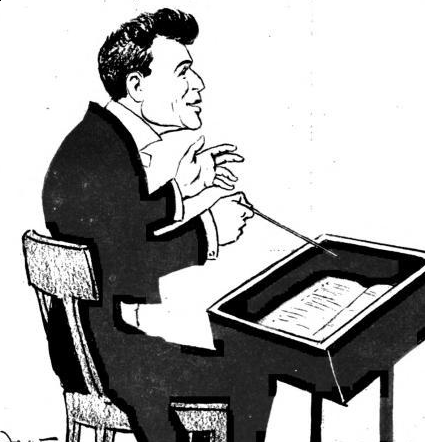
Caricature of Walter conducting (1913)

External audio
- You may listen to Bruno Walter performing Wolfgang Amadeus Mozart's Piano Concerto No. 20 in D minor K.466 with the Vienna Philharmonic Orchestra in 1937 here on archive.org

Walter's work is documented on hundreds of recordings made between 1900 (when he was 24) and 1961. Most listeners became familiar with him through the stereo recordings made in his last few years, when his health was declining. Some critics have suggested that these recordings do not fully convey what Walter's art must have sounded like in its prime. The late recordings are said to have a geniality that contrasts with the energetic, intense and mercurial performances of earlier decades. Furthermore, Walter's late recordings focus mostly on older compositions, whereas in his youth he often conducted what was then considered newer music.

Walter worked closely with Mahler as an assistant and protégé. Mahler did not live to perform his Das Lied von der Erde or Symphony No. 9, but his widow, Alma Mahler, asked Walter to premiere both. Walter led the first performance of Das Lied in 1911 in Munich and of the Ninth in 1912 in Vienna with the Vienna Philharmonic. Decades later, Walter and the Vienna Philharmonic (with Mahler's brother-in-law Arnold Rosé still a concertmaster) made the first recordings of Das Lied von der Erde in 1936 and of the Ninth Symphony in 1938. Both were recorded live in concert, the latter only two months before the Nazi Anschluss drove Walter (and Rosé) into exile.

These recordings are of special interest for the performance practices of the orchestra and also for intensity of expression. Walter was to re-record both works successfully in later decades. His famous Decca Das Lied von der Erde with Kathleen Ferrier, Julius Patzak and the Vienna Philharmonic was made in May 1952, and he recorded it again in stereo, with the New York Philharmonic, in 1960. He conducted the New York Philharmonic in the 1957 stereo recording of the Second Symphony. He recorded the Ninth in stereo in 1961. These recordings, as well as his other American recordings, were released initially by Columbia Records and later on CD by Sony.

Since Mahler himself never conducted the Ninth Symphony and Das Lied von der Erde, Walter's performances cannot be taken as documentations of Mahler's interpretations. However, in the light of Walter's personal connection with the composer and his having given the original performances, they have another kind of primary authenticity. In his other (greatly esteemed) recordings of Mahler—various songs and the First, Second, Fourth, and Fifth Symphonies—there is the great added interest that he had heard Mahler's own performances of most of them.

Walter made several acclaimed recordings of other Germanic composers, such as Bach, Haydn, Mozart, Beethoven, Schubert, Schumann, Brahms, Johann Strauss II, and Wagner. Walter was a leading conductor of opera, and recordings of Mozart's Don Giovanni, and The Marriage of Figaro from both the Metropolitan Opera and the Salzburg Festival, of Beethoven's Fidelio, and Verdi's Aida are now available on CD. Also of interest are recordings from the 1950s of his rehearsals of Mozart, Mahler and Brahms, which give insight into his musical priorities and into the warm and non-tyrannical manner—as contrasted with some of his colleagues—with which he related to orchestras.

=== Compositions ===
Walter composed actively until at least 1910. As detailed in the biography by Erik Ryding and Rebecca Pechefsky, his compositions include:

- Symphony No. 1 in D minor (composed circa 1907; premiered in Vienna, 1909; recorded by CPO 777 163–2, 2007)
- Symphony No. 2 in E (composed circa 1910)
- Symphonic Fantasia (composed 1904; premiered by Richard Strauss in 1904)
- String Quartet in D major (1903; premiered in Vienna by the Rose Quartet)
- Piano Quintet (premiered in 1905 in Vienna by the Rose Quartet)
- Piano Trio (premiered in 1906 in Vienna by Walter and members of the Rose Quartet)
- Sonata for Violin and Piano in A (circa 1908; premiered by Walter and Rose in Vienna in February 1909; recorded VAI vaia 1155, 1997)
- Incidental music for "King Oedipus" (1910. The production was an adaptation of the Sophocles play by Hugo von Hofmannsthal. It was directed by Max Reinhardt, and premiered in September 1910 in Munich, followed by performances in Berlin, Cologne, and Vienna.
- Numerous songs
- Choral Works

=== Written works ===
- Gustav Mahler's III. Symphonie. In: Der Merker 1 (1909), 9–11
- Mahlers Weg: ein Erinnerungsblatt. In: Der Merker 3 (1912), 166–171
- Über Ethel Smyth: ein Brief von Bruno Walter. In: Der Merker 3 (1912), 897–898
- Kunst und Öffentlichkeit. In: Süddeutsche Monatshefte (Oktober 1916), 95–110
- Beethovens Missa solemnis. In: Münchner Neueste Nachrichten (30. Oct. 1920), Beethoven suppl., 3–5
- Von den moralischen Kräften der Musik. Vienna 1935
- Gustav Mahler. Wien 1936
- Bruckner and Mahler. In: Chord and Discord 2/2 (1940), 3–12
- Thema und Variationen – Erinnerungen und Gedanken. Stockholm 1947
- Von der Musik und vom Musizieren. Frankfurt 1957
- Mein Weg zur Anthroposophie. In: Das Goetheanum 52 (1961), 418–21
- Briefe 1894–1962. Hg. L.W. Lindt, Frankfurt a.M. 1969

== Notable recordings ==
- 1935: Richard Wagner, Die Walküre (Act I), with the Vienna Philharmonic Orchestra, feat. soloists Lotte Lehmann, Lauritz Melchior, Emanuel List, et al. (EMI Great Recordings of the Century, Naxos Historical)
- 1938: Gustav Mahler, Symphony No. 9, with the Vienna Philharmonic Orchestra. (Dutton, EMI Great Artists of the Century, Naxos Historical) (This was the work's first recording)
- 1941: Ludwig van Beethoven, Fidelio, with the Metropolitan Opera, feat. soloists Kirsten Flagstad, Alexander Kipnis, Herbert Janssen, et al. (Naxos Historical)
- 1952: Gustav Mahler, Das Lied von der Erde, with the Vienna Philharmonic Orchestra, feat. soloists Kathleen Ferrier and Julius Patzak. (Decca Legends, Naxos Historical)
- 1956: The Birth of a Performance: Walter's rehearsals and finished performance of Mozart's "Linz" Symphony, with the Columbia Symphony Orchestra. A then-rare instance of rehearsals of a performance being issued on a commercial recording. (Sony Masterworks)
- 1958–1961: Ludwig van Beethoven, Symphony No. 4, Symphony No. 6 and Symphony No. 9, with the Columbia Symphony Orchestra. (Sony Bruno Walter Edition)
- 1960: Johannes Brahms, Symphony No. 2 and Symphony No. 3, with the Columbia Symphony Orchestra. (Sony Bruno Walter Edition)
