= National Theatre (Munich) =

Opera house in Munich, Germany

Coordinates: 48°08′22″N 11°34′46″E

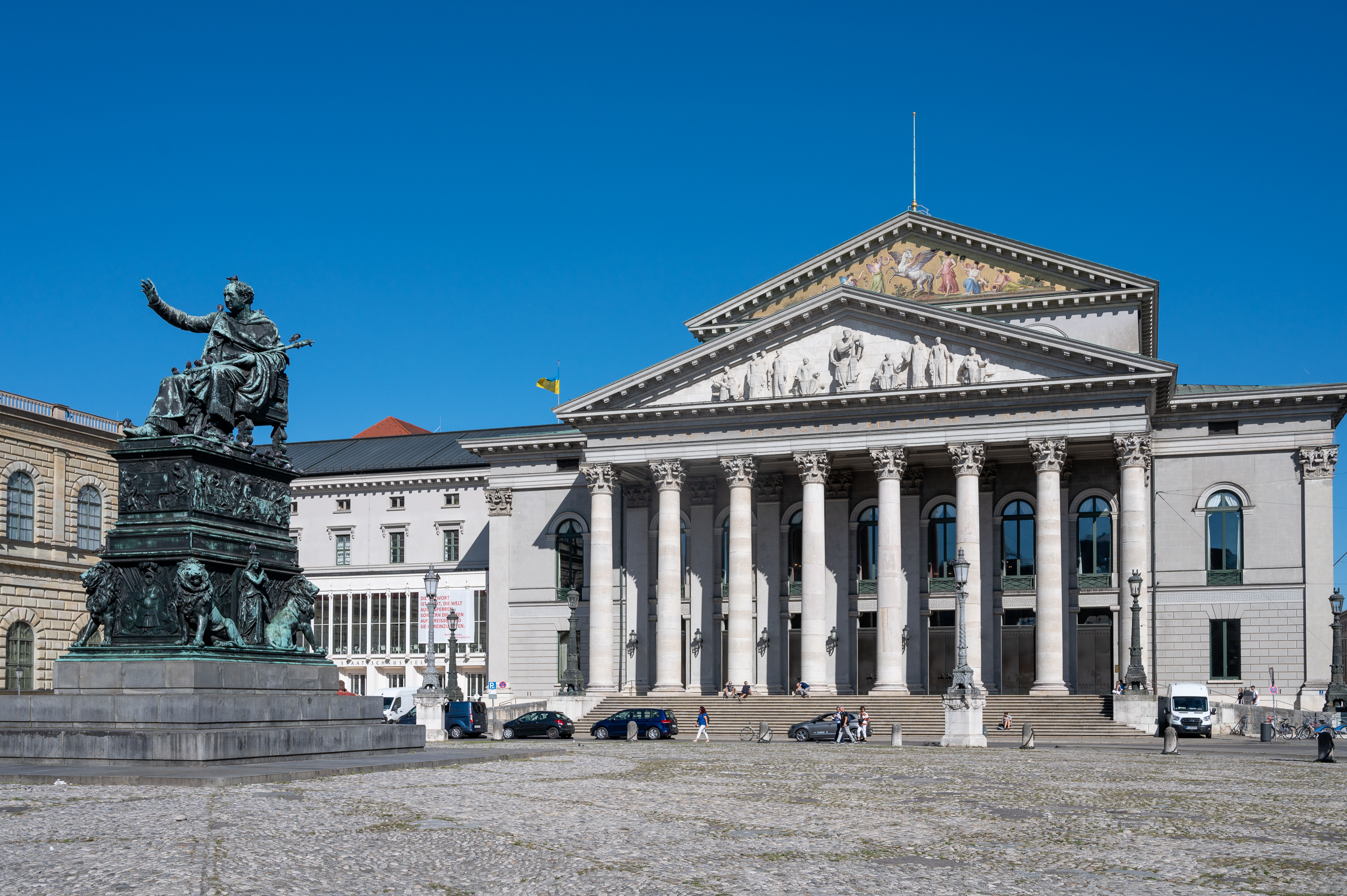
National Theatre in Munich (2022)

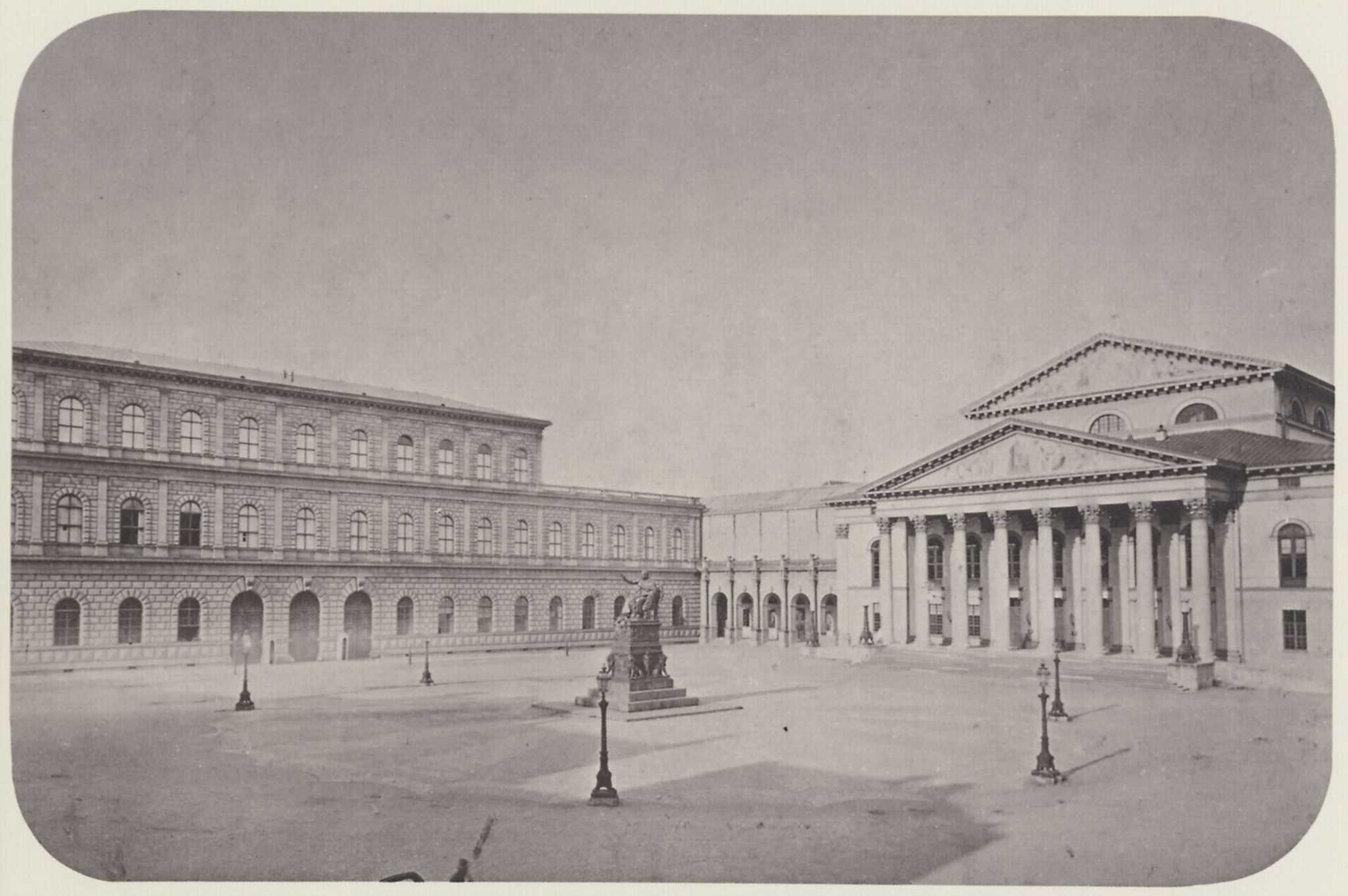
Königsbau of the Munich Residenz (left) and National Theatre (right), photographed by Joseph Albert (1860)

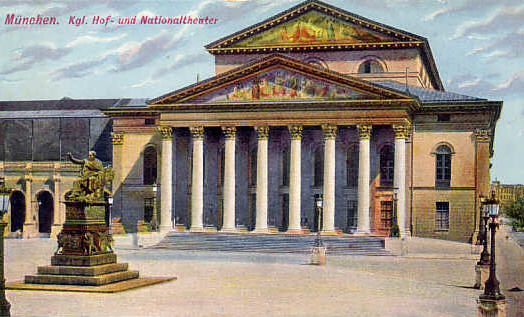
National Theatre, around 1900

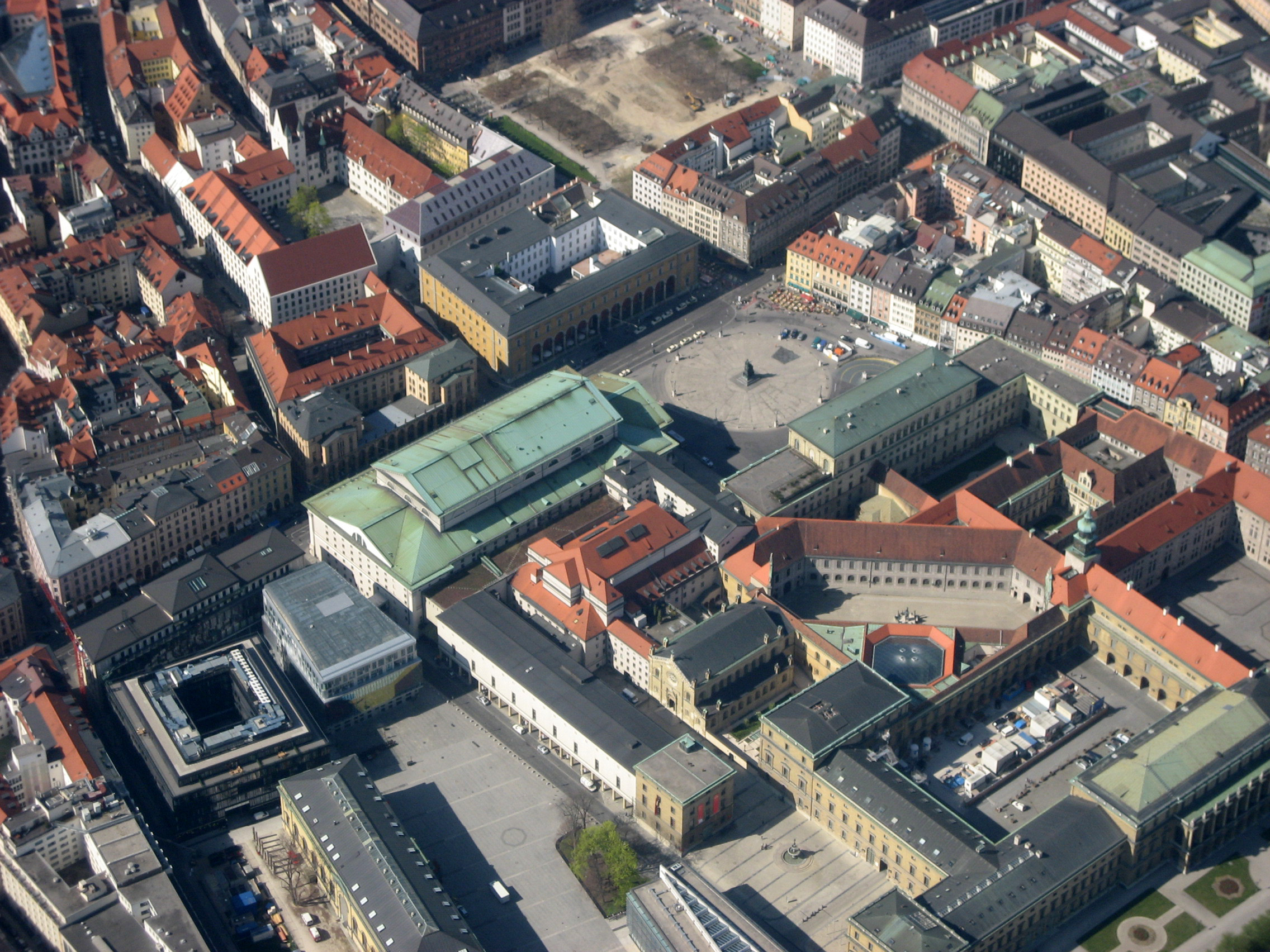
Aerial view (looking southwest) showing location of National Theatre (green roof) in relation to Max-Joseph-Platz (circle) and Residenz (right), 2007

The National Theatre (German: Nationaltheater) on Max-Joseph-Platz in Munich, Germany, is a historic opera house, home of the Bavarian State Opera, Bavarian State Orchestra and the Bavarian State Ballet.

With 2,101 seats, the theatre is the country's largest opera house.

== Building ==
=== First theatre – 1818 to 1823 ===
The first theatre was commissioned in 1810 by King Maximilian I of Bavaria because the nearby Cuvilliés Theatre had too little space. It was designed by Karl von Fischer, with the 1782 Odéon in Paris as architectural precedent. Construction began on 26 October 1811 but was interrupted in 1813 by financing problems. In 1817 a fire occurred in the unfinished building.

The new theatre finally opened on 12 October 1818 with a performance of Die Weihe by Ferdinand Fränzl, but was soon destroyed by another fire on 14 January 1823; the stage décor caught fire during a performance of Die beyden Füchse by Étienne Méhul and the fire could not be put out because the water supply was frozen. Coincidentally the Paris Odéon itself burnt down in 1818.

=== Second theatre – 1825 to 1943 ===
Designed by Leo von Klenze, the second theatre incorporated Neo-Grec features in its portico and triangular pediment and an entrance supported by Corinthian columns. In 1925 it was modified to create an enlarged stage area with updated equipment. The building was gutted in an air raid on the night of 3 October 1943.

=== Third theatre – 1963 to present ===
The third and present theatre (1963) recreates Karl von Fischer's original neo-classical design, though on a slightly larger, 2,100-seat scale. The magnificent royal box is the centre of the interior rondel, decorated with two large caryatids. The new stage covers 2,500 square metres (3,000 sq yd), and is thus Europe's third largest, after the Opéra Bastille in Paris and the Grand Theatre, Warsaw.

Through the consistent use of wood as a building material, the auditorium has excellent acoustics. Architect Gerhard Moritz Graubner closely preserved the original look of the foyer and main staircase. It opened on 21 November 1963 with an invitation-only performance of Die Frau ohne Schatten under the baton of Joseph Keilberth. Two nights later came the first public performance, of Die Meistersinger von Nürnberg, again under Keilberth.

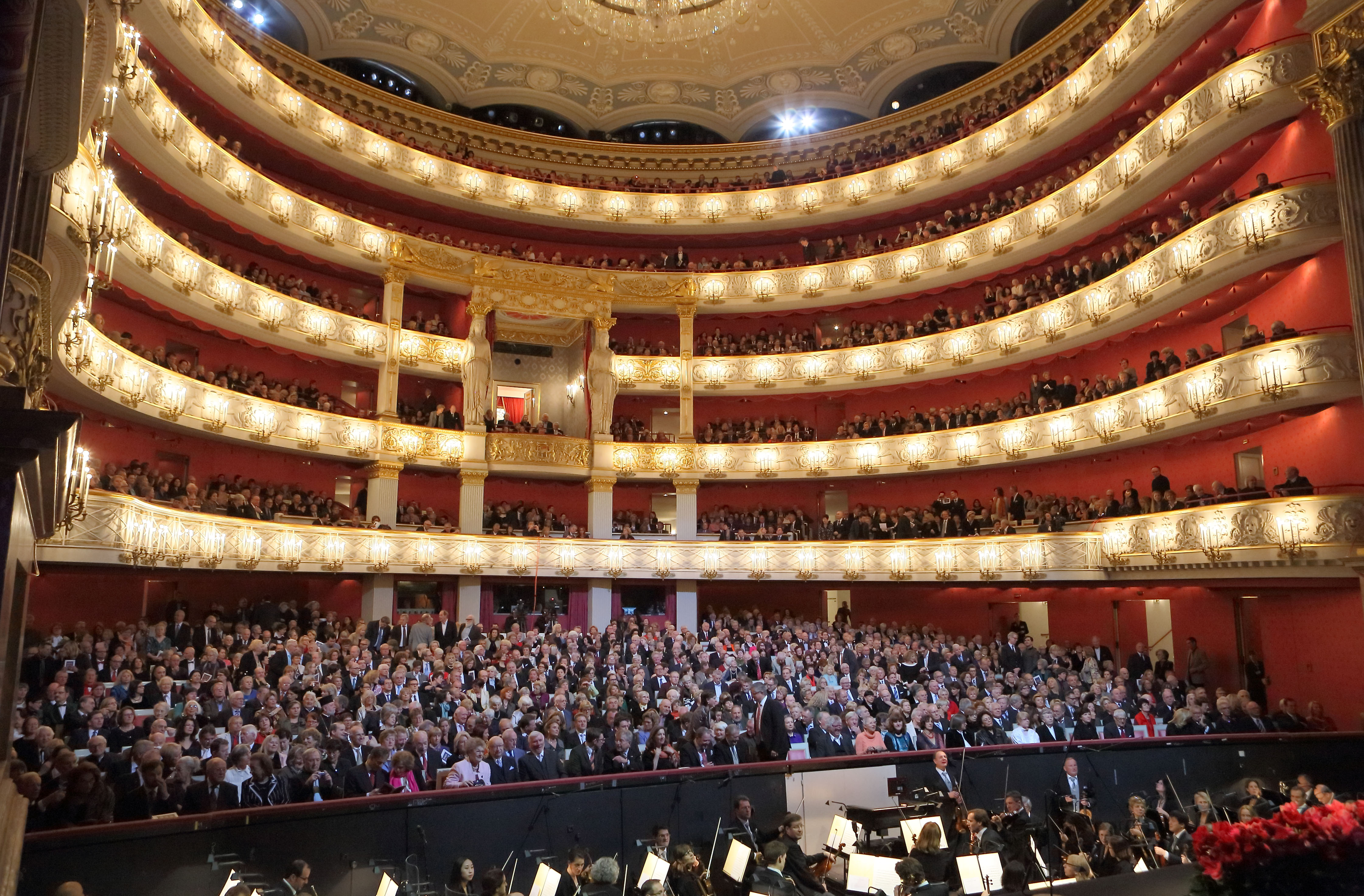
Interior of the National Theatre

== Opera ==
During its early years, the National Theatre saw the premieres of a significant number of operas, including many by German composers. These included Wagner's Tristan und Isolde (1865), Die Meistersinger von Nürnberg (1868), Das Rheingold (1869) and Die Walküre (1870), after which Wagner chose to build the Bayreuth Festspielhaus and staged his works there.

== Richard Strauss ==
During the latter part of the 19th century, it was Richard Strauss who would make his mark on the theatre in the city in which he was born in 1864. After accepting the position of conductor for a short time, Strauss returned to the theatre to become principal conductor from 1894 to 1898. His Friedenstag (1938) and Capriccio were premièred in Munich.

== Bavarian State Opera ==
The list refers only to those premiers of the Bavarian State Opera staged in the National Theatre Munich.

- 7 October 1849, Benvenuto Cellini by Franz Lachner, Henri Auguste Barbier and Léon de Wailly
- 10 June 1865, Tristan und Isolde by Richard Wagner
- 21 June 1868, Die Meistersinger von Nürnberg by Richard Wagner
- 22 September 1869, Das Rheingold by Richard Wagner
- 26 June 1870, Die Walküre by Richard Wagner
- 29 June 1888, Die Feen by Richard Wagner
- 23 January 1897, Königskinder (Melodrama edition) by Engelbert Humperdinck and Elsa Bernstein
- 10 October 1897, Sarema by Alexander von Zemlinsky, Adolf von Zemlinszky and Arnold Schoenberg
- 22 January 1899, Der Bärenhäuter by Siegfried Wagner
- 19 March 1906, I quatro rusteghi (Die vier Grobiane) by Ermanno Wolf-Ferrari and Giuseppe Pizzolato (German by Hermann Teibler)
- 11 December 1906, Das Christ-Elflein by Hans Pfitzner and Ilse von Stach
- 4 December 1909, Il segreto di Susanna (Susannens Geheimnis) by Ermanno Wolf-Ferrari and Enrico Golisciani (German by Max Kalbeck)
- 28 March 1916, Der Ring des Polykrates by Erich Wolfgang Korngold, Leo Feld and Julius Korngold and Violanta by Erich Wolfgang Korngold and Hans Müller-Einigen
- 30 November 1920, Die Vögel by Walter Braunfels (freely adapted from Aristophanes)
- 15 November 1924, Don Gil von den grünen Hosen by Walter Braunfels (after Tirso de Molina)
- 12 November 1931, Das Herz by Hans Pfitzner and Hans Mahner-Mons
- 24 July 1938, Friedenstag by Richard Strauss, Joseph Gregor and Stefan Zweig
- 5 February 1939, Der Mond by Carl Orff
- 28 October 1942, Capriccio by Richard Strauss and Clemens Krauss
- 27 November 1963, Die Verlobung in San Domingo by Werner Egk (after Heinrich von Kleist)
- 1 August 1972, Sim Tjong by Yun I-sang and Harald Kunz
- 9 July 1978, Lear by Aribert Reimann and Claus H. Henneberg
- 10 May 1981, Lou Salomé by Giuseppe Sinopoli and Karl Dietrich Gräwe
- 22 July 1985 Le Roi Bérenger (König Bérenger I.) by Heinrich Sutermeister (after Eugène Ionesco)
- 8 November 1985, Night by Lorenzo Ferrero and Peter Wehran (after Novalis)
- 25 January 1986, Belshazar by Volker David Kirchner and Harald Weirich
- 7 July 1986, Troades by Aribert Reimann and Gerd Albrecht (after Euripides and Franz Werfel)
- 6 July 1991, Ubu Rex by Krzysztof Penderecki (after Alfred Jarry)
- 1 July 1996, Schlachthof 5 by Hans-Jürgen von Bose (after Kurt Vonnegut)
- 24 May 1998, Was ihr wollt by Manfred Trojahn and Claus H. Henneberg
- 30 October 2000, Bernarda Albas Haus by Aribert Reimann (after Federico García Lorca)
- 27 October 2006, Das Gehege by Wolfgang Rihm and Botho Strauß
- 30 June 2007, Alice in Wonderland by Unsuk Chin and David Henry Hwang
- 22 February 2010, Die Tragödie des Teufels by Peter Eötvös and Albert Ostermaier
- 27 October 2012, Babylon by Jörg Widmann and Peter Sloterdijk
- 31 January 2016, South Pole by Miroslav Srnka and Tom Holloway
