= Alfredo Costa =

Italian opera singer (1874–1913)

Alfredo Costa (1874 in Rome – 1913 in Naples) was an Italian operatic baritone who had an active international career from 1900 until his death in 1913 at the age of 39. He appeared in French and Italian language operas of the 19th century and early 20th century, performing throughout the Italian provinces, and in Brazil, Chile, France, Portugal, Ukraine, and the United States. His voice is preserved on recordings made for Pathé Records in 1908, and for Odeon Records and the Gath & Chaves department store in Buenos Aires.

== Life and career ==
Born in Rome, Costa initially worked as a photographer alongside his father, Mariano, in the studio of Fotografia Reale di Montabone. He began his training at the Accademia Nazionale di Santa Cecilia under Antonio Cotogni in 1894. In 1900 he made his professional opera debut as Renato in Giuseppe Verdi's Un ballo in maschera at the Teatro Sociale in Pinerolo. That same year he portrayed Lescaut in Jules Massenet's Manon at the Teatro Nuovo in Mirandola. He remained active performing operas throughout the Italian provinces for the next decade. In 1901 he performed at the Teatro dell'Opera di Roma as Alfio in Cavalleria rusticana and Silvio in Pagliacci, and was seen at the Teatro Verdi in Sassari as Lotario in Ambroise Thomas' Mignon, De Siriex in Umberto Giordano's Fedora, and Rodolfo in Leoncavallo's La bohème. He also portrayed several roles on stage at the Teatro Metastasio in Prato that year, including Alfio, Escamillo in Carmen, and at the Politeama Rossetti in Trieste; including Marcello in Puccini's La bohème and Valentin in Charles Gounod's Faust.

In 1903, Costa gave his first performances at the Teatro Massimo Bellini in Catania and at the Teatro Carignano in Turin as Marcello. In 1904, he made his debut at the Teatro Lirico in Milan as Michonnet in Francesco Cilea's Adriana Lecouvreur. He appeared in many operas at that house through 1906, including Cascart in Leoncavallo'a Zazà, the Count in Francisco José Lopez's Aben, Elio in Giacomo Orefice's Chopin, Gleby in Giordano's Siberia, Hermogenes in Lorenzo Filiasi's Manuel Menéndez, and Tassilo in Antonio Francesco Carbonieri's Editha. In 1905 he performed the role of Carlo Gérard in Andrea Chénier for his debut at the Teatro Grande in Brescia, and he performed the role of Figaro in Rossini's The Barber of Seville singing Largo al factotum (Make way for the factotum) for his debut at the Teatro di San Carlo in Naples in 1906. In 1907 he was committed to the Teatro Reinach in Parma where he appeared as Cascart and Silvio. In 1908-1909 he was committed to the Teatro Verdi in Padova where he appeared as Cascart, De Siriex, and Figaro.

In 1901 Costa gave his first performance outside of Italy at the National Theatre Bucharest as Silvio. From 1901 to 1903 he was committed to the Teatro Nacional de São Carlos in Lisbon where he appeared as Caoudal in Massenet's Sapho, and reprised the roles of De Siriex, Marcello, and Silvio. In 1902 he made his South American debut as Rossini's Figaro at the Teatro Apollo in Rio de Janeiro, followed by a reprisal at the Teatro Santana in São Paulo. In 1903-1904 he was committed to the Odessa Opera where he appeared as Caoudal, Rossini's Figaro, and Puccini's Marcello. In 1905 he performed the roles of De Siriex and Elio at the Théâtre de la Ville in Paris. In 1908, he portrayed the role of Cascart for his debut at the São João National Theatre, and appeared in numerous operas at the Municipal Theatre of Santiago in Chile. In 1910 he performed the role of Scarpia in Puccini's Tosca at the Teatro Parisiana in Alexandria, Egypt. In 1910 he joined the roster of the Chicago Grand Opera Company with whom he also toured frequently to the city of Philadelphia for performances at the Philadelphia Metropolitan Opera House. He remained with that company through 1912, performing such roles as Amonasro in Aida, Count di Luna in Rigoletto, Count Gil in Il segreto di Susanna, Lord Enrico Asthon in Lucia di Lammermoor, and Silvio in Pagliacci among others. He died of nephritis in Naples in 1913. He was married to soprano Isabella Orbellini.
