= Francesco Maria Bonini =

Italian opera singer

- Born: 1865
- Died: 11 January 1930 (aged 64–65)
- Occupation: Italian baritone

Francesco Maria Bonini (1865 – 11 January 1930) was an Italian baritone who had a major international opera career from 1896 through 1927. He was one of the first wave of musicians to be recorded, having made a number of recordings with Fonotipia Records in Milan in 1905–1906.

== Career ==
Born in Naples, Bonini studied singing with Beniamino Carelli at the Conservatory of San Pietro a Majella in his native city. He made his stage debut in 1896 at the Teatro Mercadante in Foggia as Don Carlo di Vargas in Giuseppe Verdi's La forza del destino. In 1897–1898 he made appearances at the Amazon Theatre in Brazil, the Valletta Royal Opera House in Malta and at the Cairo Opera House in Egypt.

In 1899 Bonini returned to Italy to appear in operas in Brescia and Cremona. He sang at the Odessa Opera and Ballet Theater in 1900 and 1902 and in 1901 he was committed to the Teatro Colón in Buenos Aires. In 1903 he made his debuts at the Teatro Massimo in Palermo and at La Scala in Milan, the latter in the role of Arnoldo in Amilcare Ponchielli's I Lituani . On 17 October 1903 he portrayed the role of Athanaël in the Italian premiere of Jules Massenet's Thaïs at the Teatro Lirico Internazionale in Milan opposite Lina Cavalieri in the title role.

On 19 December 1903, Bonini made his debut at the Teatro di San Carlo in Naples as Michonnet in that house's first staging of Francesco Cilea's Adriana Lecouvreur with Solomiya Krushelnytska in the title role. He remained committed to that theatre through 1905, portraying such roles as Walitzin/Commissario in Umberto Giordano's Siberia and Johannes Rathenow in the Italian premiere of Ruggero Leoncavallo's Der Roland von Berlin. He also made appearances in the world premiere of Leopoldo Mugnone's Vita Brettona and the Naples premiere of Lorenzo Filiasi's Manuel Menendez.

From 1905–1907, Bonini was engaged at the Teatro Nacional de São Carlos in Lisbon. While there he appeared in the world of premiere of João Arroyo's Amor de Perdição. He sang at the Teatro Regio di Parma in 1907–1908, portraying such roles as Carlo Gérard in Andrea Chénier, David in L'amico Fritz, Kurwenal in Tristan und Isolde, and Rinaldo in Amica among others. From 1909–1911 he appeared mostly at the Teatro Regio in Turin in such roles as Kurwenal, Wolfram von Eschenbach in Tannhäuser, and the title roles in Boris Godunov, Falstaff, Hérodiade, and Rigoletto.

In 1911–1912 Bonini returned to La Scala where he was seen as Hidraot in Christoph Willibald Gluck's Armide, King Raimondo in Isabeau, and Hans Sachs in Die Meistersinger von Nürnberg. He returned to the Teatro Regio in Turin in 1913 where he assailed the role of Friedrich of Telramund in Lohengrin for the first time. That same year he made a few appearances at the Teatro Real in Madrid.

Bonini spent the latter part of his career working as a freelance artist, mainly in Italy. In 1918 he made his first appearance at the Teatro Costanzi in Rome as Falstaff. That same year he had a major success at the Teatro Comunale di Bologna as Germont in La traviata with Ester Mazzoleni as Violetta. He returned to Bologna numerous times through 1922 in such roles as Comte de Nevers in Les Huguenots, Rigoletto, and Wolfram. In 1919 he portrayed Amenofi in Amilcare Ponchielli's Il figliuol prodigo at the Arena di Verona Festival. In 1922 he sang Germont at La Fenice and in 1923 he sang Nevers and Germont at the Teatro Municipale Piacenza. He also made several appearances at the Teatro Regio di Parma in the 1920s.

== Later life ==
Bonini retired from the stage in 1927, after which he lived in Milan where he taught singing. Other roles which he performed during his career included Alfonso in La favorita, Amonasro in Aida, Barnaba in La Gioconda, Nélusko in L'Africaine, Renato in Un ballo in maschera, Scarpia in Tosca, and Valentin in Faust. He died in Milan at the age of 65.

== Sources ==
- The American Record Guide, Volume 54
- Opera on record, Volume 1
- Opera premieres: an index of casts by Charles H. Parsons
- Baker's biographical dictionary of musicians, Volume 6, page 4191
