= Teatro Flavio Vespasiano =

Theatre and opera house in Rieti, Italy

Coordinates: 42.4031°N 12.8625°E

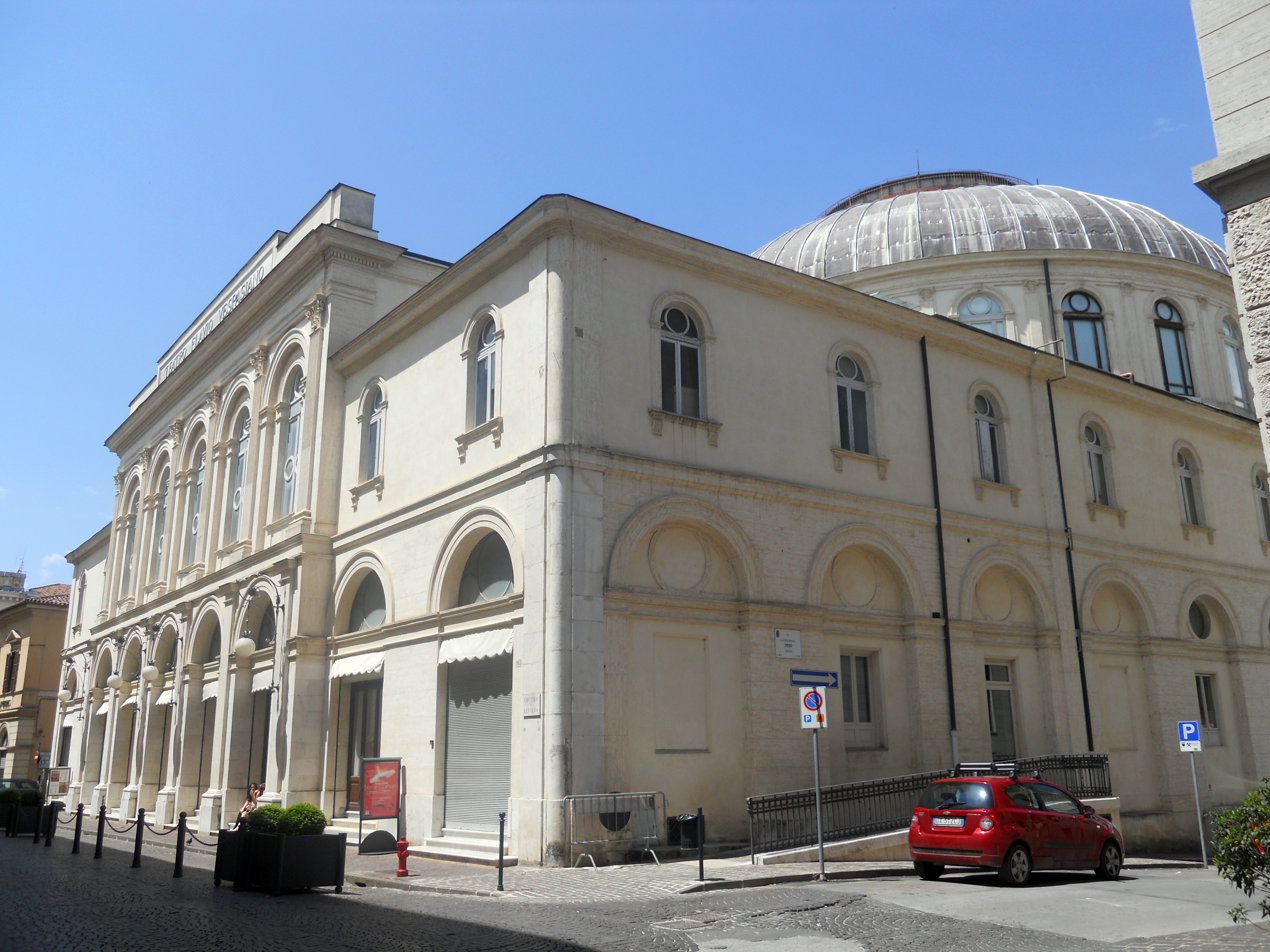
- Exterior of Teatro Flavio Vespasiano
- Interactive map of Teatro Flavio Vespasiano
- Address: Via Garibaldi 104; Rieti; Italy
- Owner: City of Rieti
- Capacity: 550

Construction
- Opened: 20 September 1893
- Architect: Achille Sfondrini

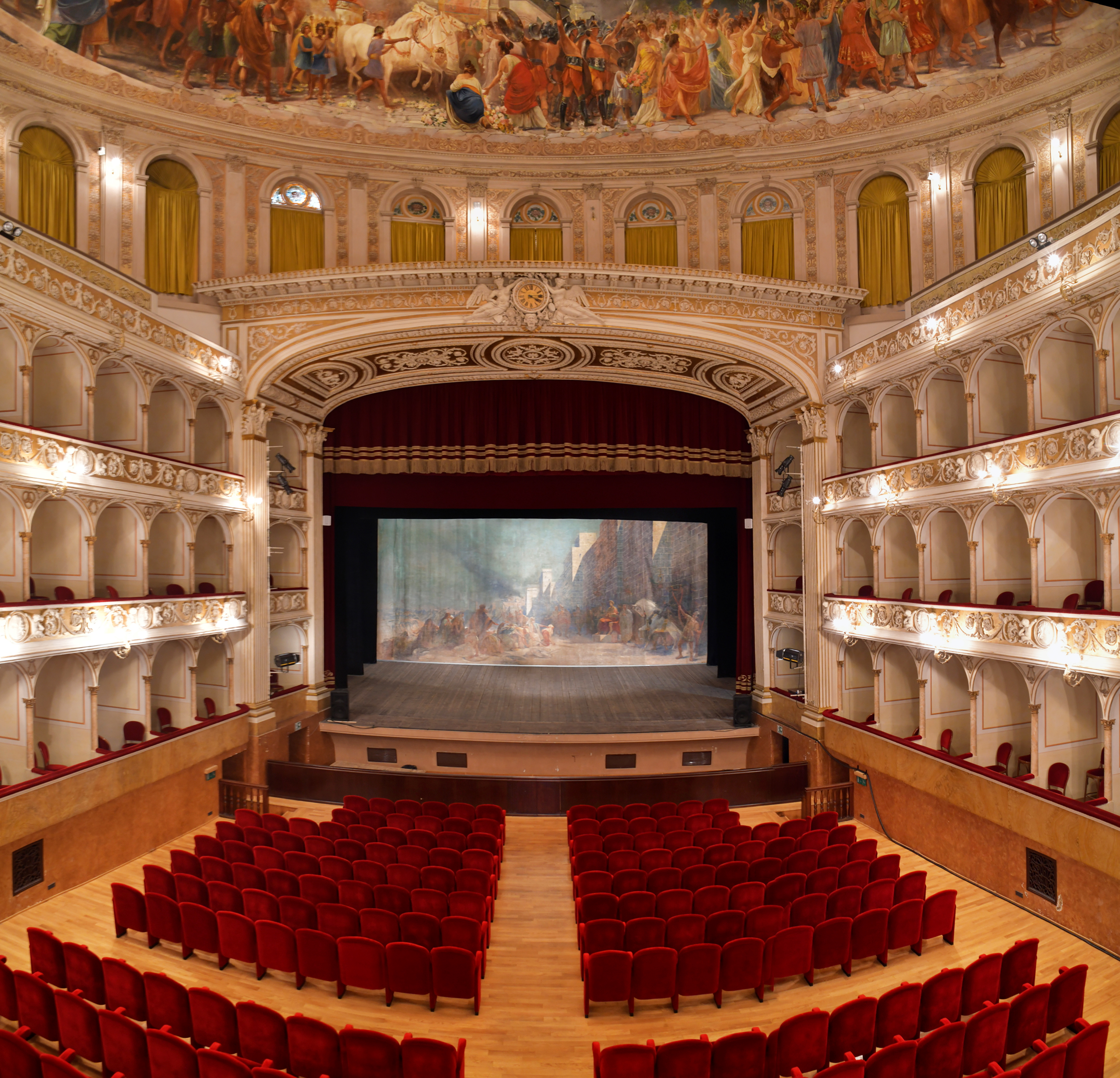
Theatre interior

The Teatro Flavio Vespasiano is the main theatre and opera house in Rieti. It was opened on 20 September 1893, after ten years of work and finishing touches; directed by architect Achille Sfondrini. It takes its name from the Roman emperor Titus Flavius Vespasian (Italian: Tito Flavio Vespasiano) who was born in Sabina (more precisely in Vicus Phalacrinae, now Cittareale).

== History ==
=== Precursors ===
The first information about the presence of a theatre in Rieti dates to the 15th - 16th centuries, with confraternities organizing plays in main city squares.

At the end of the 1500s, the need to organize plays in closed and sheltered settings lead to Teatro dell'Accademia del Tizzone, located in via Terenzio Varrone, in a former hospital.

Nevertheless, places used as theatres were too small. For this reason between 1765 - 1768, the building was demolished and replaced with Teatro dei Condomini. This new building was made of wood and was wider than the previous, making it the first real theatre in Rieti.

=== Design and construction ===
At the beginning of the 1800s people in Rieti felt the need to build a bigger and grounder theatre, both for the increasing number of spectators and for the will to make a building of greater architectural renown. The city wanted a building to compete with the counterparts built in the rest of Italy.

In 1838 the architect Luigi Poletti made an initial design, imagining a structure in piazza Oberdan. The idea got set aside and the project was entrusted to the architect Vincenzo Ghinelli. Ghinelli designed an area in via Garibaldi for the building.

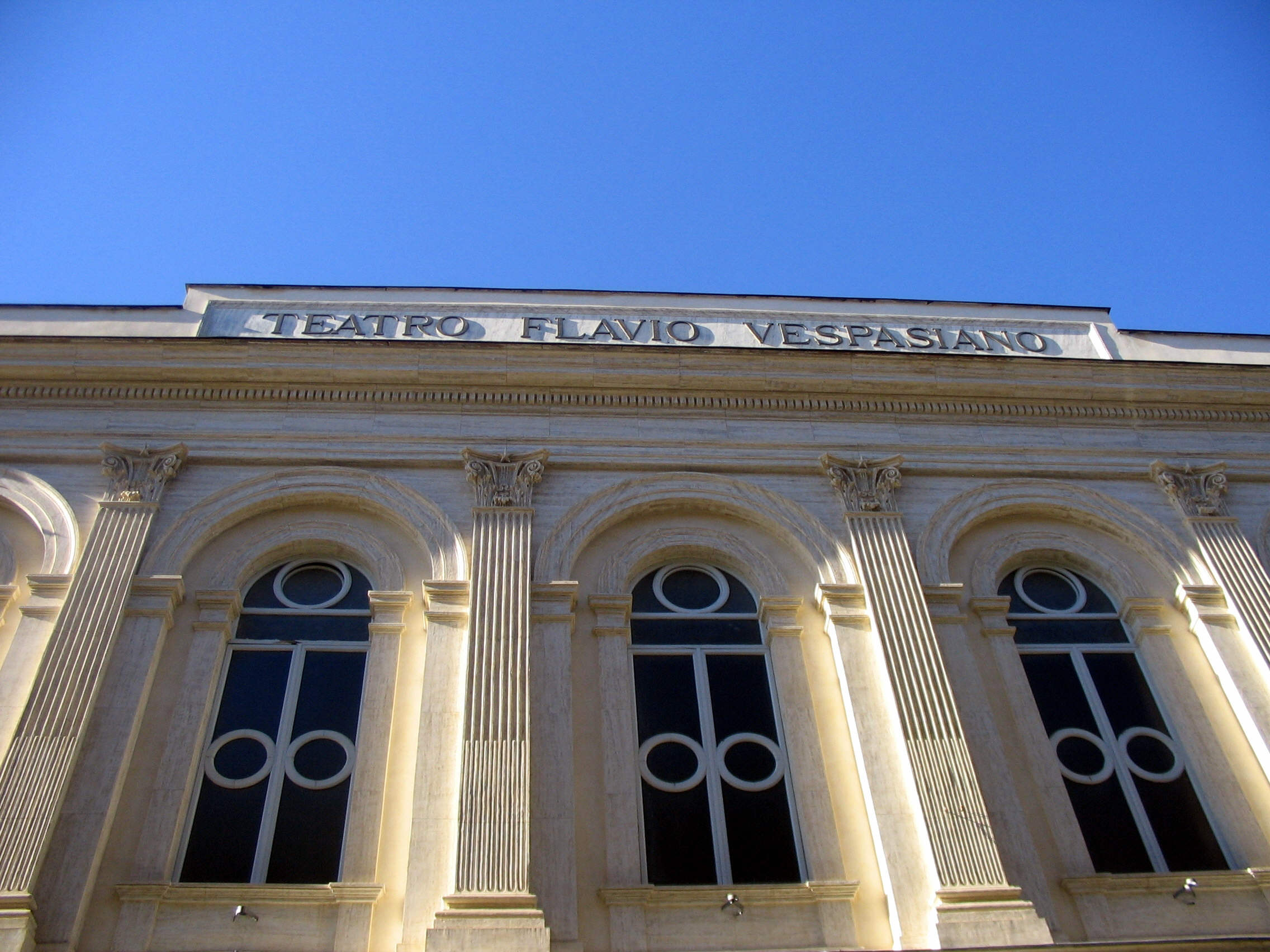
Façade's detail

Due to high costs, in 1859 city's bank (Cassa di Risparmio di Rieti) was involved. In 1867 the municipality took over the works entrusting them to the architect Achille Sfondrini, who already designed Teatro Costanzi di Roma.

Deciding a name proved to be a hard task as well. One faction asked the theatre to be named after the composer from Rieti Giuseppe Ottavio Pitoni. The other faction asserted the former composer to be too clerical, thus proposing the name of the Roman emperor Titus Flavius Vespasian. Eventually, the latter won.

A law in 1882 condemned buildings made of wood, because they were too dangerous. This law raised the need for a new theatre much more pressing, as the older Teatro dei Condomini closed. As a consequence, 16 December 1883 saw the lay of the foundation stone.

The building was erected quickly and was completed in 1885. Interior decoration took much more time. In 1893, a road connection between the back side of the theatre and the underlying piazza Oberdan was built. The road connection consists of two ramps and it is nicknamed "pincetto" after Rome's pincio ramp.

Works completed the same year, with the theatre opening on 20 September 1893 with a double bill of Gounod's Faust and Pietro Mascagni's Cavalleria rusticana.

=== Activity ===
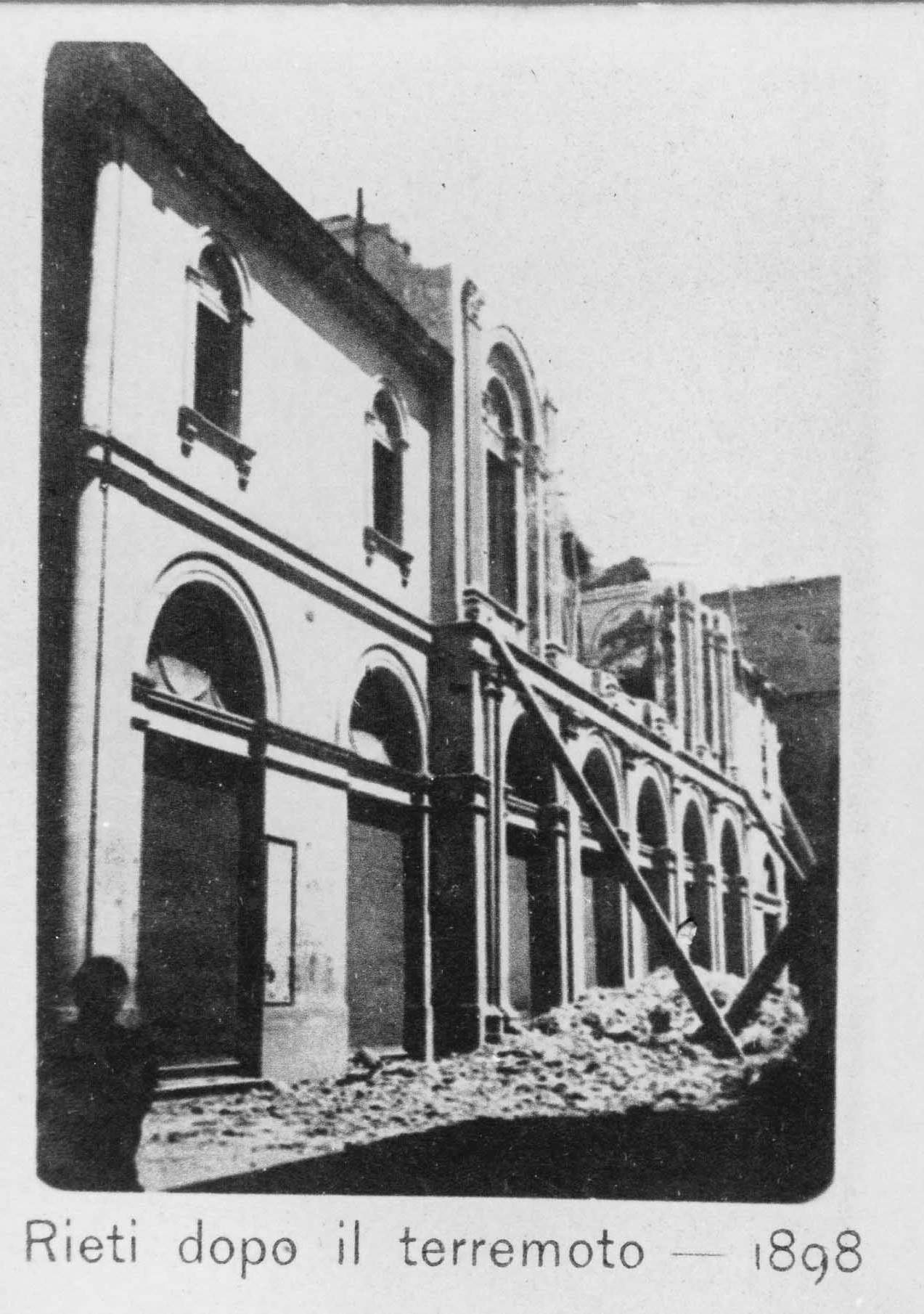
The theatre after the 1898 earthquake in Rieti

Just five years after opening, an earthquake in Rieti damaged the theatre, making collapse the dome and part of the façade. With the collapse, the painting on the dome by Giuseppe Casa was destroyed. Within a few years, the theatre was fixed and newly working. The dome got a new painting made in tempera in 1901 by Giulio Rolland.

During World War II, the excavation of an air raid shelter caused the cave-in of the foundation and caused severe damages to the theatre itself. Due to low inflow, it was used as a movie theatre during the post-war.

In memory of the Holocaust, celebrating the siege of Jerusalem and its perpetrator Vespasian seemed inopportune. For this reason, both naming and internal works' themes were questioned. The anti-fascist city mayor Angelo Sacchetti Sassetti demanded the theatre be named after Giuseppe Ottavio Pitoni and the hiding of both dome and curtain. Nevertheless, the city hall council rejected his demands as well as his resignation. Eventually, Sacchetti Sassetti himself changed his mind.

At the end of the nineties, the theater has been restored, making the façade looking respectable again.

Due to new safety regulations, some of the spaces designed for public events were closed. After four years of work to make the spaces compliant, on 10 January 2009 it was opened again with an inaugural concert performed by Opera studio of Accademia nazionale di Santa Cecilia and directed by Marcello Rota. In the event, four solo artists performed: sopranos Karina Grigoryan and Jessica Pratt, mezzo-soprano Anna Goryachova, and baritone Roman Burdenko. Among the audience, was the Undersecretary of State to the Presidency of the Council Gianni Letta, and senator Franco Marini. Along with compliance works, golds and stuccos were restored. In total, the work cost was € 3.3mln.

In 2009 comune di Rieti approved works for creating space designed for theatre play production on the theatre's west side. Those works, still in progress, will accommodate the theatre not only for shows but for production as well.

More works, financed by regione Lazio in 2016, will allow the recovery of sala degli specchi and sites where circolo di lettura was located. Such work did not start yet.

== Description ==
=== Exterior ===
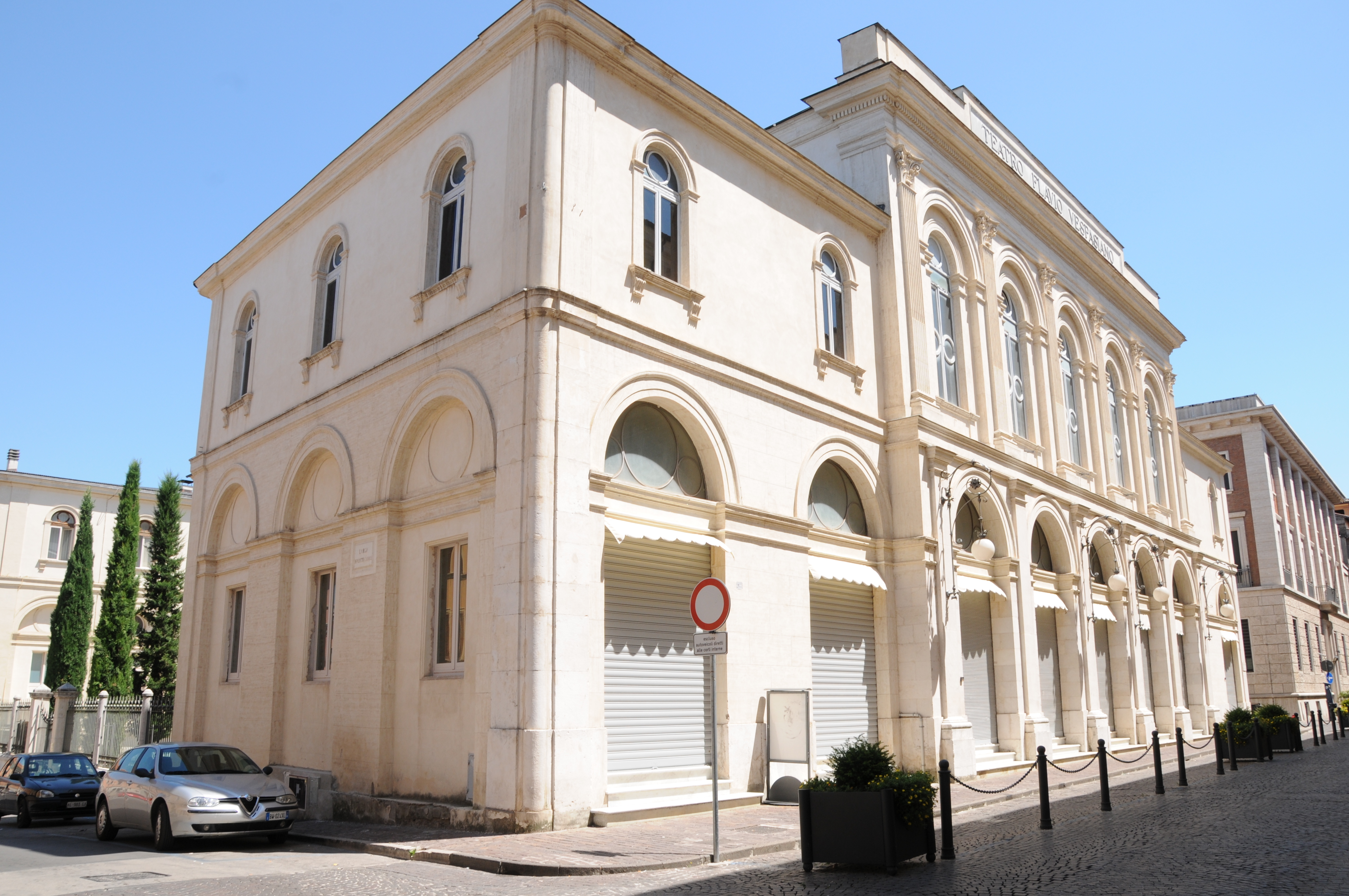
Façade

From the outside, the theatre looks hidden by surrounding buildings. Because of that, it is impossible to contemplate it in its entirety. For the exterior, Sfondrini used Teatro Costanzi as a model.

The south-facing façade is on via Garibaldi, one of the arterial roads of the old town. Due to its proximity to Palazzo Vincenti Mareri, located on the other side of the road, the theatre can be observed only from a quasi-lateral position. In a renaissance revival style, it is composed of two orders of round arches alternated with lesene.

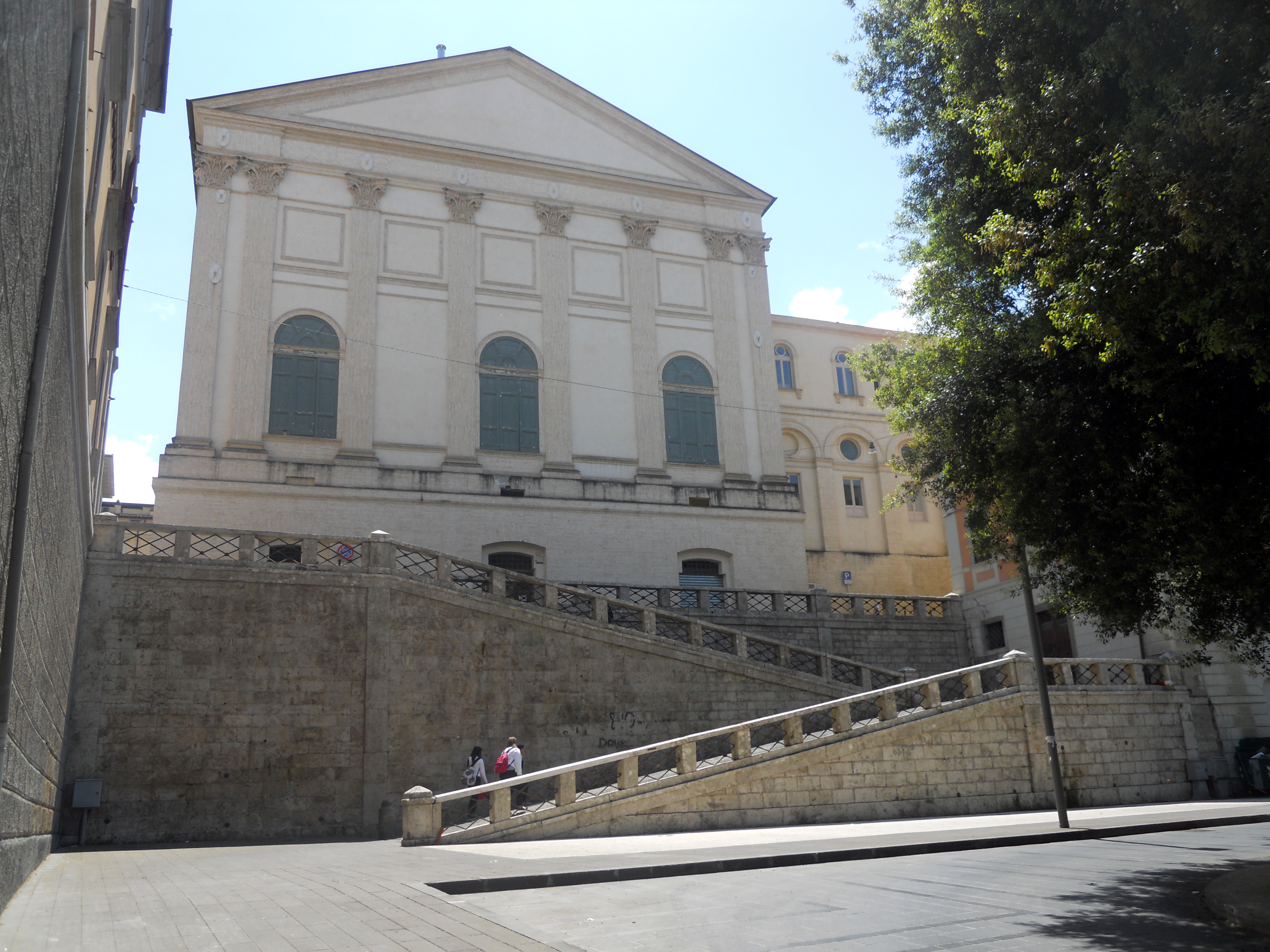
Back side as seen from piazza Oberdan, with "pincetto" connecting the square to via Centuroni

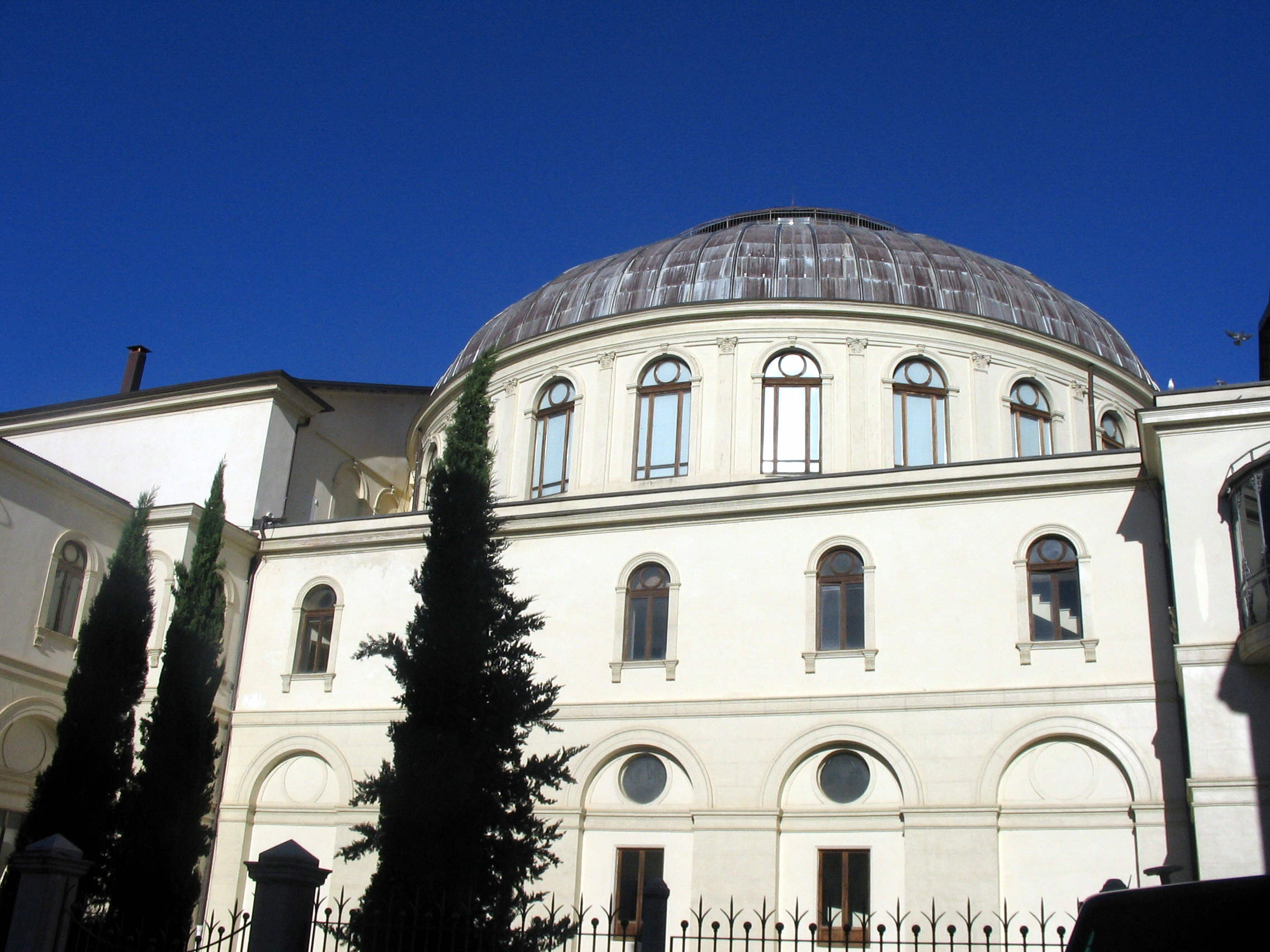
West side as seen from Largo Carioli

The theatre's back side, north-facing, is on via Centuroni. Compared to the façade, the back side is more exposed. Thus it is almost completely visible from the piazza Oberdan. Not like the façade, the back side is in neoclassical style with a tympanum crowning element (originally decorated) hiding the side of the dome.

The west side, on Largo Carioli, offers a more airy visual of the structure. On this side, it is possible to see the tholobate on which the lead slab-covered dome raises.

=== Interior ===
For the interior, Sfondrini used as a model the Teatro Verdi that he previously designed.

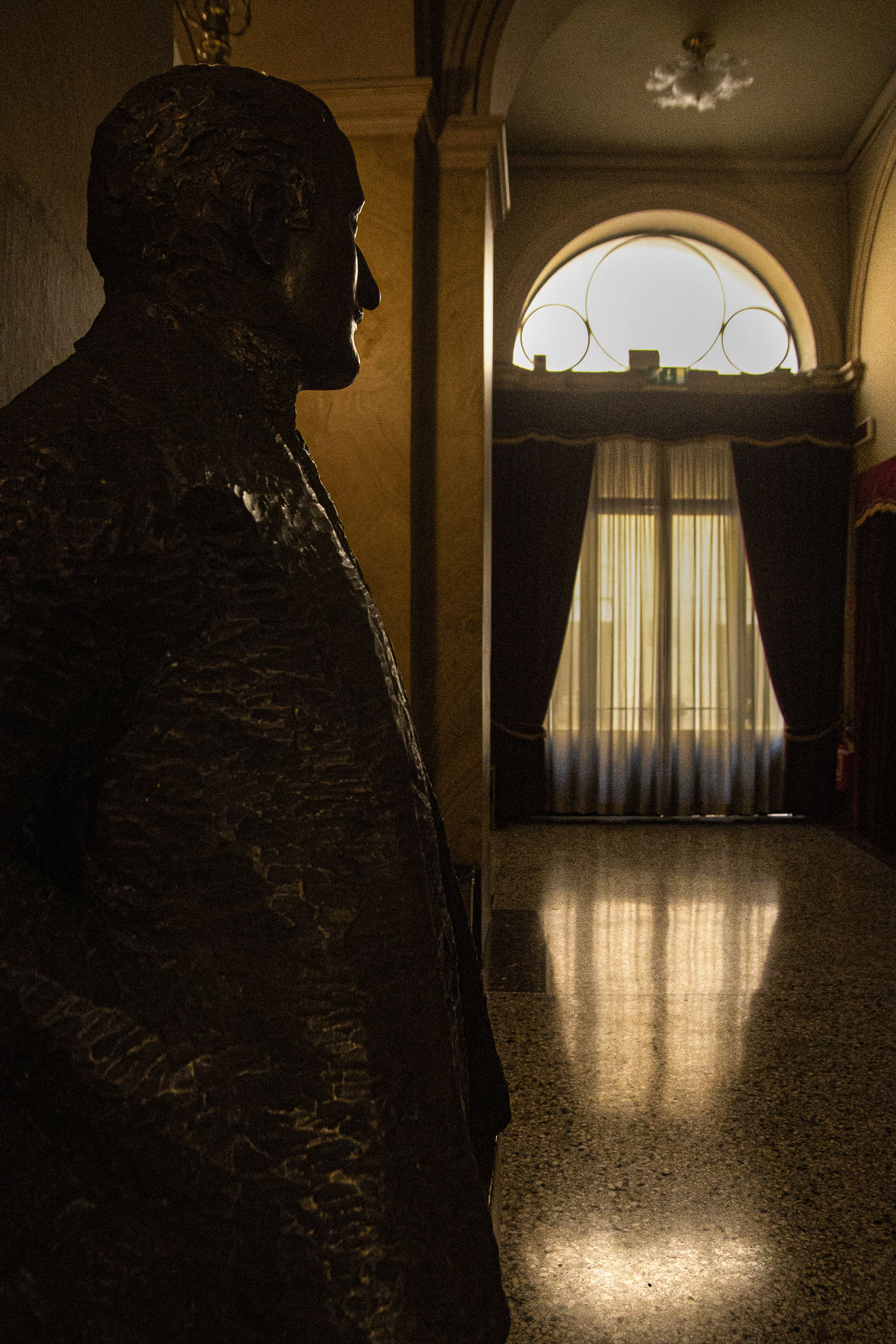
The foyer

Foyer

The foyer is located at the entrance. Composed of five pillars, it is often used for temporary exhibitions. Next to the hall, there are spaces for smoking and coffee, as well as the box office. Inside the hall, there are busts and commemorative plaques to celebrate the most important artists who played in the theatre, among them the baritone Mattia Battistini.

The foyer's ceiling is decorated with an oval tempera painting depicting the Allegory of Music. The painting was made in 1892 by Federico Ballester. Also there is a tempera painting depicting the muses, made in 1916 by Antonino Calcagnadoro. Other decorations are made by Giuseppe Casa.

Circolo di Lettura e Sala degli Specchi

Among other places, the theatre contains the Circolo di lettura, consisting of a set of finely decorated rooms designed for balls and concerts. The main room is Sala degli Specchi, a room furnished with huge mirrors (Italian: specchi, hence the name) on the walls, and an allegoric painting by Giulio Rolland named Le ebbrezze della Musica.

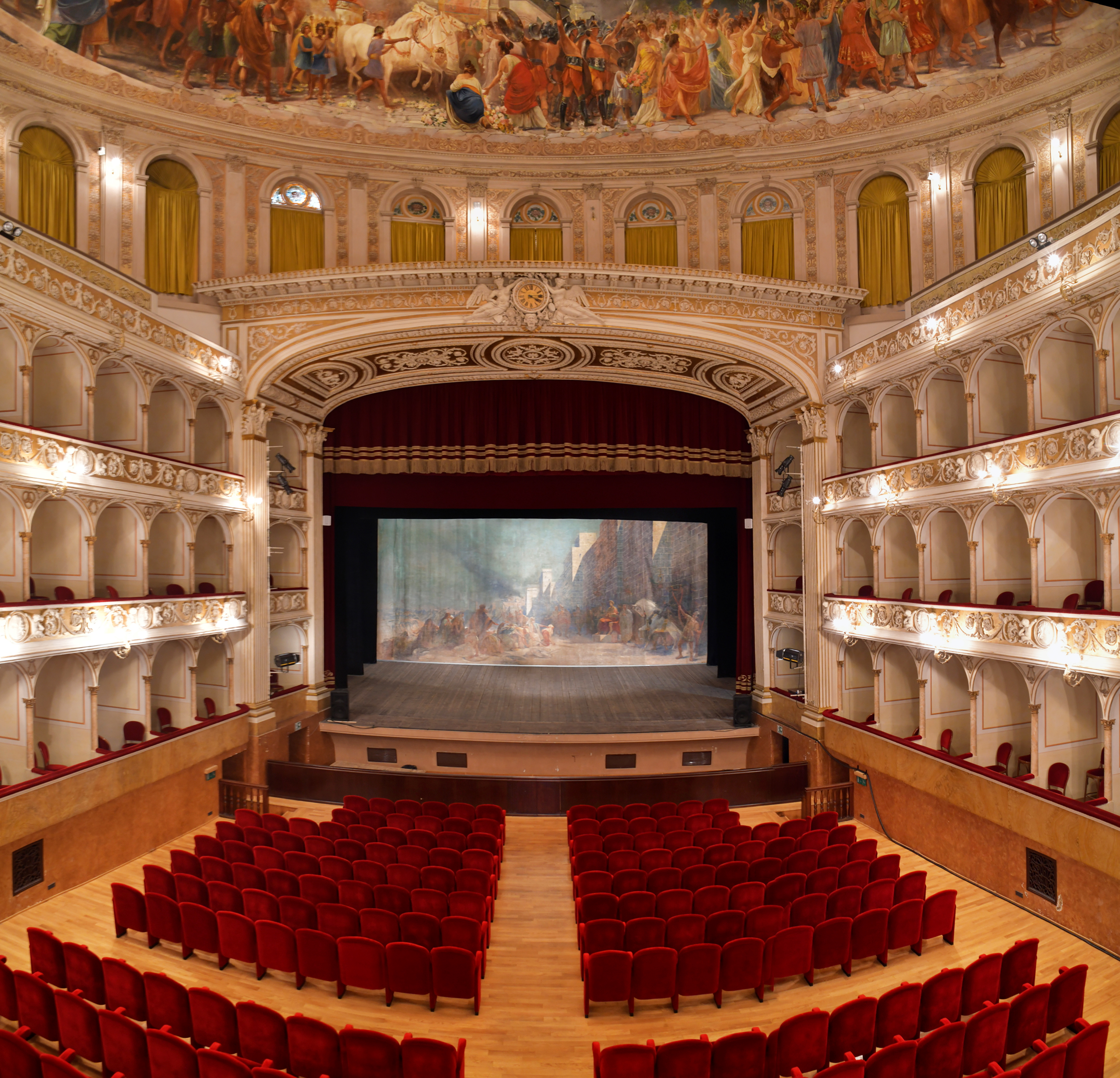
Main room

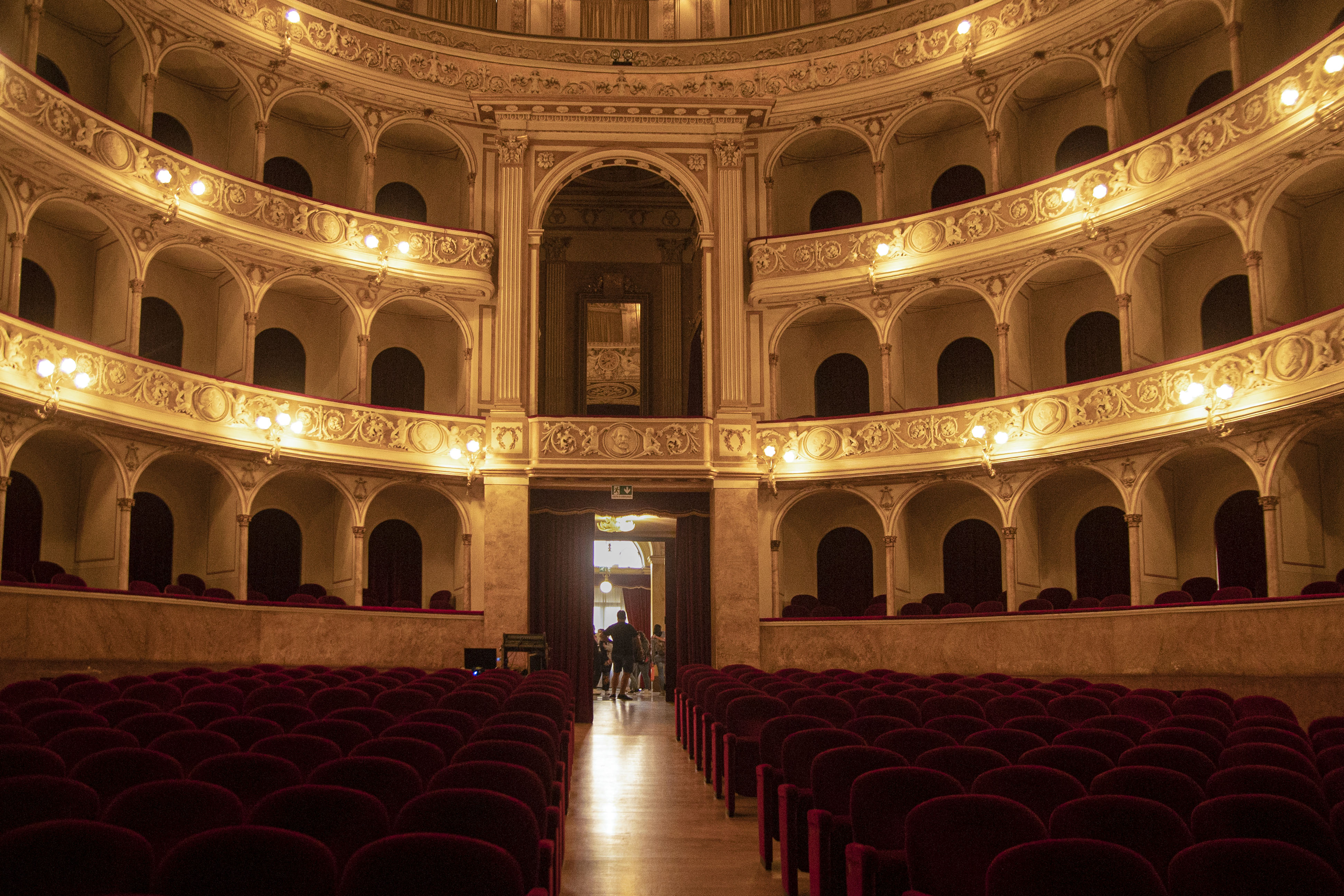
Royal loge

Main room

The main room is composed of a stall including 230 red seats, split in two by a central aisle. After the 2005 restoration, the room regained its cream tone.

On the perimeter, there are three orders of loges, for a total of 72 loges: 24 per floor. The gods are on top of the loges, while the stage is in front of them. On the loges' second order is the royal loge, decorated on the ceiling with an oval tempera painting by Giuseppe Casa depicting three putti, while the balcony is decorated with stucco low relief depicting Giuseppe Verdi. The balconies in the second and third order, as well as the ones in the gods, are decorated with putti and stuccos depicting musicians with their names written right below. Originally, the gods was meant to host more than one hundred people; nowadays, because of security measures, it can host up to thirty-three people.

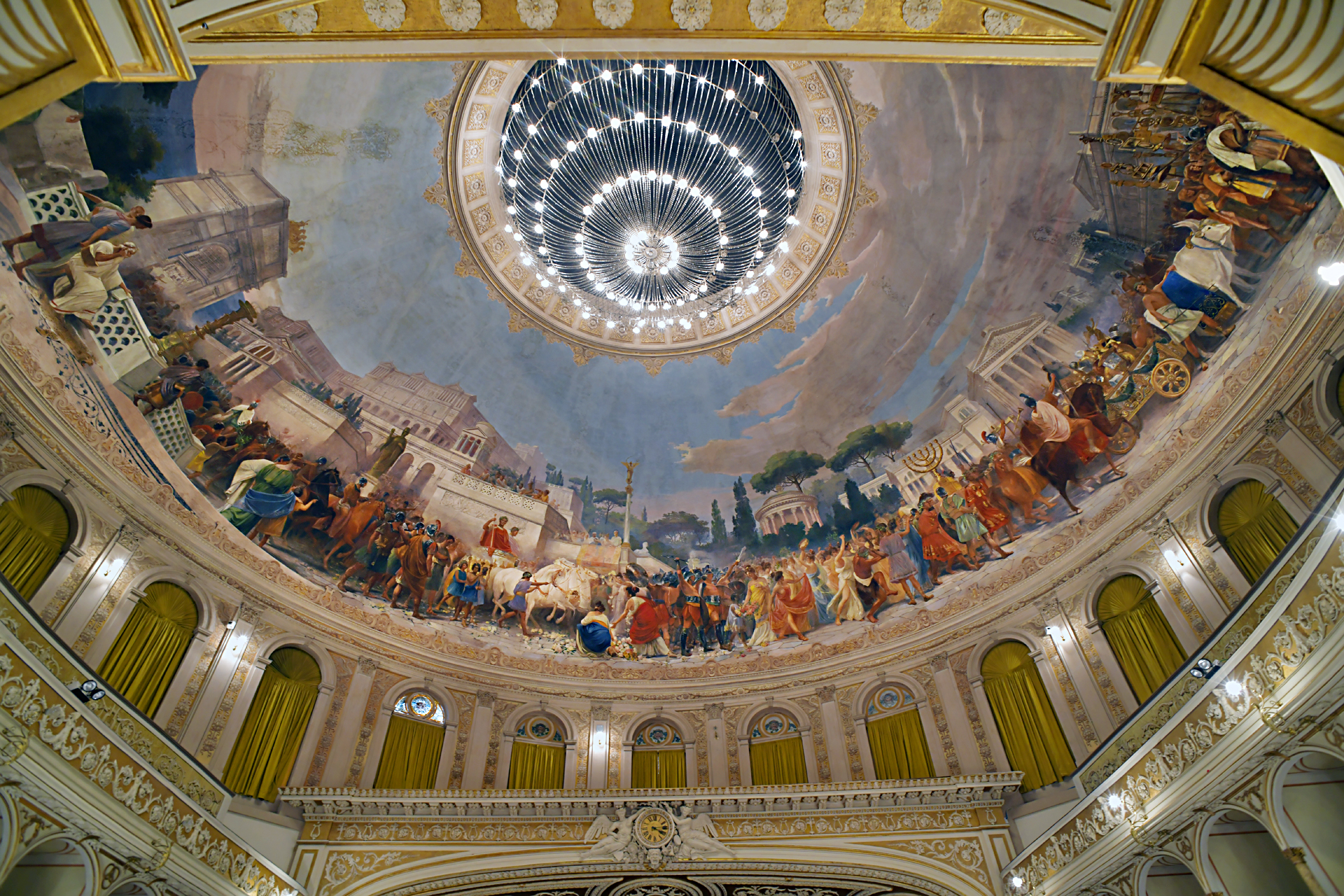
The dome, including the chandelier and tempera painting Il trionfo di Tito by Giulio Rolland (1901)

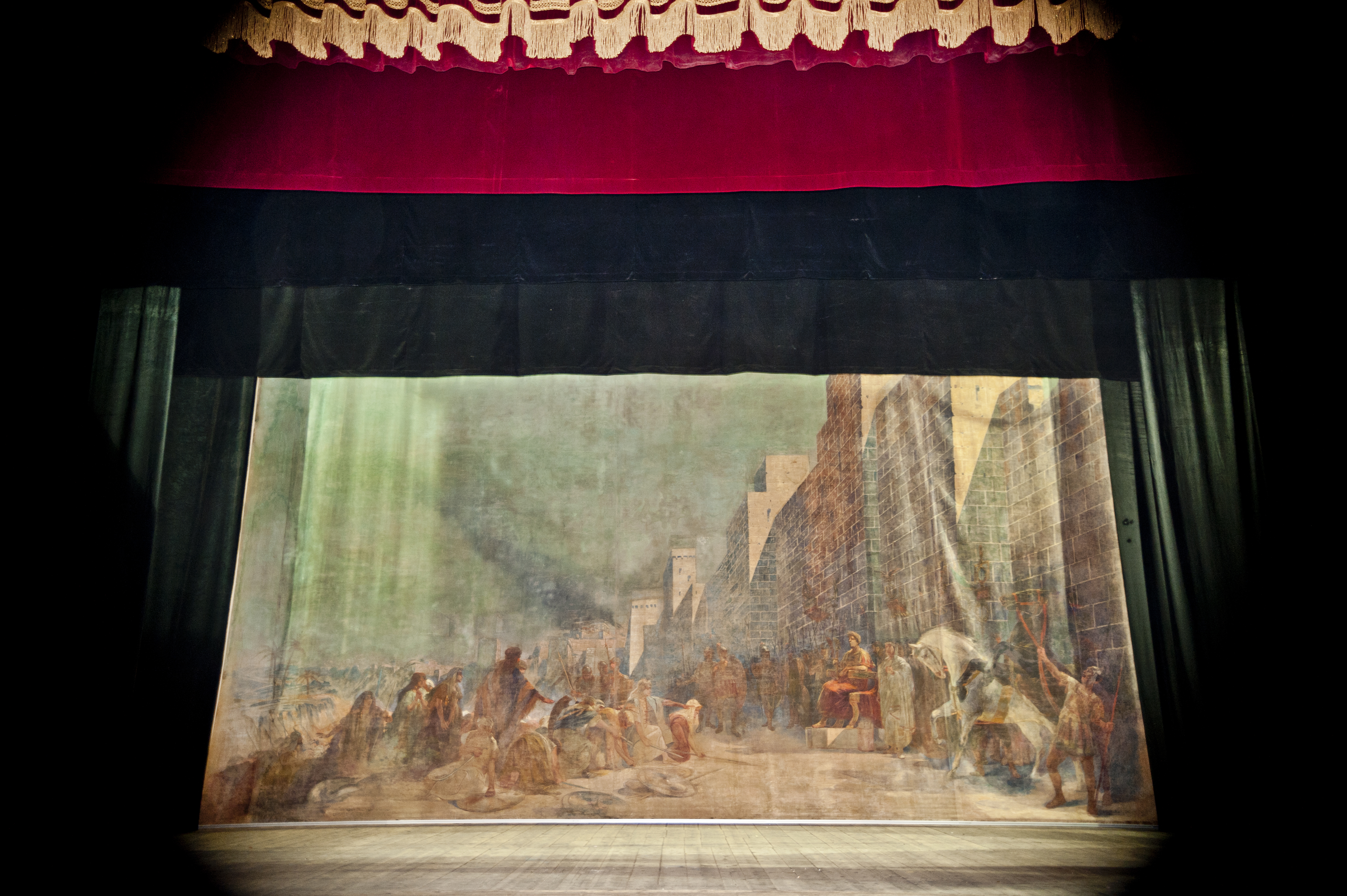
The curtain with Resa di Gerusalemme by Antonino Calcagnadoro (1910)

A big dome overlooks the whole space. The dome is adorned with a rich chandelier and frescoed in 1901 with a tempera painting by Giulio Rolland. The fresco celebrates the triumph of Titus and Flavius in Rome after the victory in Jerusalem.

The stage is enclosed by a front curtain on which in 1910 Antonino Calcagnadoro painted the surrender of Jerusalem over Vespasian after the siege of Jerusalem. The painting is made with tempera on canvas with a size of 13.4m x 7.6m. The curtain was long forgotten until, in 2019, it has been restored by Accademia di Belle Arti dell'Aquila and was newly exhibited to the audience.

In front of the stage, it is located the orchestra pit.

== Acoustics ==
The theatre is well known for its great acoustic. Thanks to this feature, in 2002 it won official recognition; when Uto Ughi assigned the first edition of the national award for acoustic to the theatre. Professor Bruno Cagli president of Accademia nazionale di Santa Cecilia, defined the theatre as the best in the world from an acoustic standpoint.

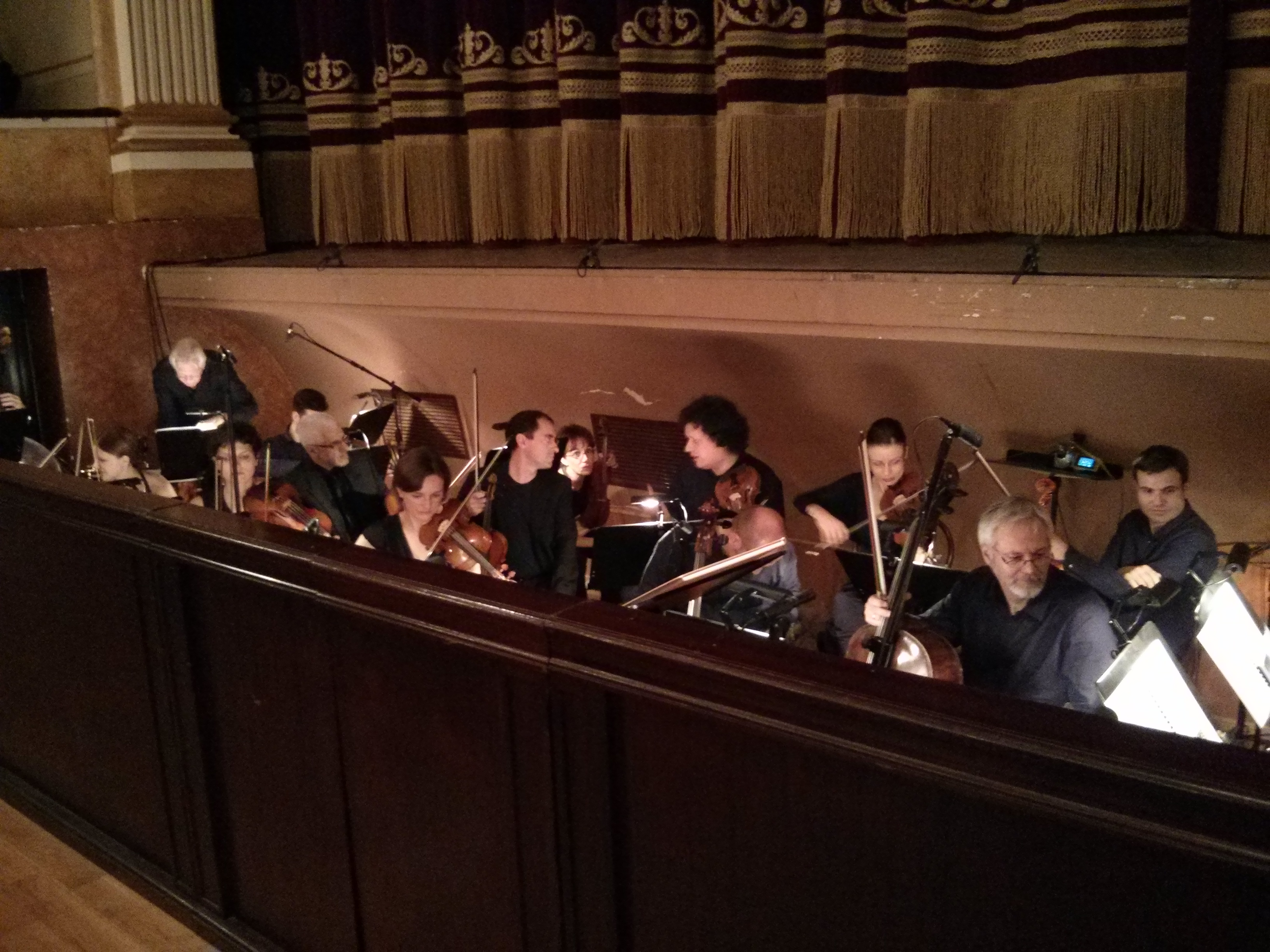
The orchestra pit

== The Foundation ==
Around this theater, many things that will bring the Italian tradition and Rieti prestige high in the world can be born, and I will try to carry out this task with the utmost responsibility and great joy. It is not easy to be good enough for a theater with such a long and ancient history.

— Gianni Letta, during the opening ceremony after 2005-2009 works.

Along with the theatre reopening, it was established the Flavio Vespasiano Foundation. The main goal of the foundation is to promote artistic and musical ventures internationally. Privates can support the foundation through donations, getting in exchange a position within the board of directors. During the opening ceremony, the presidency has been offered to the Undersecretary of State to the Presidency of the Council Gianni Letta, who accepted the role.
