= Emma Carelli =

Italian opera singer (1877–1928)

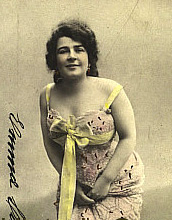
- Emma Carelli in Lorenza
- Born: 12 May 1877; Naples
- Died: 17 August 1928 (aged 51); Rome
- Citizenship: Italian
- Occupation: operatic soprano

Emma Carelli (12 May 1877 in Naples – 17 August 1928 near Rome) was an Italian operatic soprano who was particularly associated with the dramatic soprano roles of the verismo repertoire and the works of Richard Wagner. After a singing career which lasted almost two decades, she managed the Teatro Costanzi in Rome for almost fifteen years.

== Early life ==
After studying with her father, Beniamino Carelli, at the Conservatorio San Pietro a Majella, she made her professional debut in 1895 in the title role of Mercadante's La vestale during the centenary celebrations at Altamura and went on to appear in the opera houses of many Italian cities. In 1898 she married the left-wing politician, self-made millionaire, and later impresario, Walter Mocchi.

== Career ==
She sang in several world premieres including: Pietro Floridia's La Colonia libera (1899); Meryem in Cesare Galeotti's Anton (1900) and Rosaura in Mascagni's Le maschere at La Scala in 1901. For several years she also sang in South America, primarily Argentina, as part of a touring troupe organized by her husband. In Buenos Aires (1902) she triumphed in the premiered of "Khrysé" by Arturo Berutti (after Pierre Louys ´s "Aphrodite"), singing the title role. In 1903, she sang the title role in Edoardo Mascheroni's opera Lorenza for its South American premiere in Buenos Aires. She became particularly associated with the title role in Leoncavallo's Zazà and sang in several operas by Richard Wagner, including the roles of Kundry in Parsifal and Elisabeth in Tannhäuser. She also sang the title role in Puccini's Tosca, the title role in Giordano's Fedora, Santuzza in Mascagni's Cavalleria rusticana, and Margherita in Boito's Mefistofele among other roles.

In 1908, Carelli's husband purchased the Teatro Costanzi. His company, Società Teatrale Internazionale, produced the world premiere of Leoncavallo's Maia during its second season. Carelli took over the management from her husband in 1912 with a new company (Impresa Teatro Costanzi), while he concentrated on running the South American the touring troupe and the Teatro Municipal in Rio de Janeiro and the Teatro Colón in Buenos Aires. During her 14-year management of the theatre, several operas received their first Rome performances including Richard Strauss's Elektra (in which she sang the title role), La fanciulla del West, Turandot and Il trittico by Giacomo Puccini; Parsifal by Richard Wagner; Francesca da Rimini by Riccardo Zandonai; Boris Godunov by Modest Mussorgsky; Samson et Dalila by Camille Saint-Saëns. Apart from Elektra, her only other performance as a singer during that time was in the title role of Mascagni's Iris. In 1926, Carelli and Walter Mocchi sold the Costanzi to the Rome City Council and withdrew from most of their other business interests in South America. Carelli died two years later in a car accident. A few years after her death, Mocchi married Bidu Sayão, whose career Carelli had fostered.

== Recordings ==
Vissi d'arte
Performed by Carelli in 1906

- Harold Wayne Collection Volume 37: Eugenia Burzio, Emma Carelli, Ester Mazzoleni contains six arias recorded by Carelli between April and July 1906—"Je suis encour tout étourdie" from Manon; "Vissi d'arte" from Tosca; "Io son l'umile ancella" and "Poveri fiori" from Adriana Lecouvreur; and "No! se un pensier torture" and "Non odi là il martir" from Siberia. Label: Symposium 1244.

== Sources ==
- J.B. Steane: "Emma Carelli", Grove Music Online ed. L. Macy (Accessed October 29, 2008), (subscription access)
- Riemens, Leo (1969). A concise biographical dictionary of singers; from the beginning of recorded sound to the present. Chilton Book Co.
- Emma Carelli biography from Operissimo.com (In German)
- Bio of Amedeo Bassi at grandi-tenori.com
- Rome Opera House website
