= Accademia Nazionale di Santa Cecilia =

Musical institution in Rome, Italy

Coordinates: 41°55′44″N 12°28′28″E

The Accademia Nazionale di Santa Cecilia (English: National Academy of St Cecilia) is one of the oldest musical institutions in the world, founded by the papal bull Ratione congruit, issued by Sixtus V in 1585, which invoked two saints prominent in Western musical history: Gregory the Great, for whom the Gregorian chant is named, and Saint Cecilia, the patron saint of music. Since 2005 it has been headquartered at the Renzo Piano designed Parco della Musica in Rome.

It was founded as a "congregation", or "confraternity", and over the centuries has grown from a forum for local musicians and composers to an internationally acclaimed academy active in music scholarship (with 100 prominent music scholars forming the body of the Accademia), music education (in its role as a conservatory) and performance (with an active choir and a symphony orchestra, the Orchestra dell'Accademia Nazionale di Santa Cecilia). The category of alumni of the associated conservatory (which in 1919 succeeded a liceo) includes many noted composers and performers.

== History ==
The first seat of the Congregation from 1585 to 1622 was the church of Santa Maria ad Martires, better known as the Pantheon. Successive relocations were to the church of San Paolino alla Colonna (1622–52), Santa Cecilia in Trastevere (1652–61), San Nicola dei Cesarini (1661–1663), Chiesa della Maddalena (1663–85), and, finally, San Carlo ai Catinari in 1685.

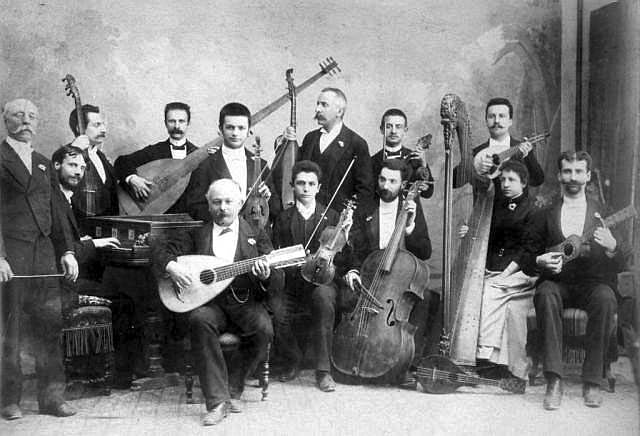
Musicians of the academy posing before the concert they gave at the Palazzo Doria Pamphili, Rome. Giuseppe Branzoli, seated in the foreground, holds a mandolone

During the first century of existence, the Congregation was the workshop of a number of prominent musicians and composers of the day, including Giovanni Pierluigi da Palestrina. The institution in that period was often in rivalry with the other important musical organization of Papal Rome of the day, the Sistine Choir. Rivalry centred on the rights to control access to the musical profession, to train musicians, and to publish music. The rivalry never really ended and can be said to have lasted through the entire existence of the Papal States, that is, until 1870, when the "temporal power of the Church" was ended by military action of the new nation state of Italy.

The early 18th century is considered to have been a particularly glorious time for the Accademia. Among names associated with the organization during that period are Arcangelo Corelli, Alessandro and Domenico Scarlatti, and Niccolò Jommelli. In 1716, Pope Clement XI decreed that all musicians practising their profession in Rome were required to become members of the Congregation. The Accademia suspended operations during the revolutionary period of the Napoleonic Wars but opened regularly again in 1822 a few years after the Restoration brought about by the Congress of Vienna.

The years between that reopening and the end of the Papal States in 1870 were ones of great change. The organization opened its membership to hitherto excluded categories, such as dancers, poets, music historians, musical instrument makers, and music publishers. In 1838, the Congregation of Santa Cecilia was officially proclaimed an academy and then a Papal Academy. The list of active and honorary members of the Accademia during that period is formidable and includes Cherubini, Mercadante, Donizetti, Rossini, Paganini, Auber, Liszt, Mendelssohn, Berlioz, Gounod, and Meyerbeer. Among the crowned heads of Europe who were honorary members was Queen Victoria.

After the unification of Italy, the Accademia reestablished itself with the formation of a permanent symphony orchestra and choir, beginning in 1895. It went from being the seat of a Liceo musicale—a music "high school"—to being a full-blown conservatory; also, it hosts the "Eleonora Duse" Drama School, as well as a centre for experimental cinema. The most recent innovation has been the digitisation and cataloguing of centuries of musical documents—including an important collection of traditional music in the ethnomusicological archives—and their preservation and eventual display in the Accademia's multimedia library and archive also available to the public online. The Accademia also maintains a musical instruments museum (the MUSA).

== Alumni ==
- Lola Rodríguez Aragón
- Elisabetta Barbato
- Gaqo Çako
- Alfredo Costa
- Franco Donatoni
- Ferenc Farkas
- Jorgjia Filçe-Truja
- Nicolas Flagello
- Carlo Forlivesi
- Beniamino Gigli
- Aristodemo Giorgini
- Aurelio Giorni
- Gaetano Giuffrè
- Preng Jakova
- Ramiz Kovaçi
- Sylvia Kersenbaum
- Jacqueline Martel
- Hersi Matmuja
- Marco Misciagna
- Anna Moffo
- Lúcia Moniz
- Bruno Nicolai
- Piero Niro
- Carlo Peroni
- Zoltán Peskó
- Franco Piersanti
- Sergei Rachmaninoff
- Diogenes Rivas
- Sonya Scarlet
- Victor Togni
- Tessie Mobley
- Luca Antignani
