= Achille Sfondrini =

Italian architect (1836 –1900)

Achille Sfondrini (1836 –1900) was an Italian architect specializing in the design, construction and modernization of theaters. He was born and died in Milan.

He completed his university studies in Milan, graduating as an architectural engineer. In 1862, he designed a project for the economic of development of the Tiri a Segno, and was awarded first prize and a gold medal by the Provincial Commission of Milan. In 1863, he formed part of the Italian Deputation sent to the Gran Tiro Federale della Chaux de Fonds. In 1864, he won a contest for a project competition for the Gran Tiro Nazionale. For this project King Vittorio Emanuele awarded Sfondrini the Cross of the Order of Santi Maurizio e Lazzaro. In 1869, he designed and built the National Baths in Milan; in 1870, the theater of Salò. In 1872, he rebuilt the Teatro Carcano of Milan. In 1876, designed and built in four months, the monument to the Battle of Legnano. The statue was designed by the sculptor Pozzi of Milan. In 1878 he reconstructed the Theater of Pavia. His masterwork was the reconstruction of the Theater Costanzi in Rome (inaugurated in 1880), although he had financial overruns in completing the project. The theater has three rows of box seats, and it was much lauded for its acoustic setting and the modern lines. He was awarded the Order of the Crown of Italy for his work.

== Works ==
- Teatro Carcano in Milan (1872)
- Teatro Sociale in Salò (1873)
- Casinò Lugano in Lugano, Switzerland (1804)
- Teatro Flavius Vespasian in Rieti (1893)
- Teatro Costanzi in Rome (1878–1880)
- Teatro Lirico in Milan
- Teatro Verdi in Padova
