= Ester Mazzoleni =

Italian soprano (1883–1982)

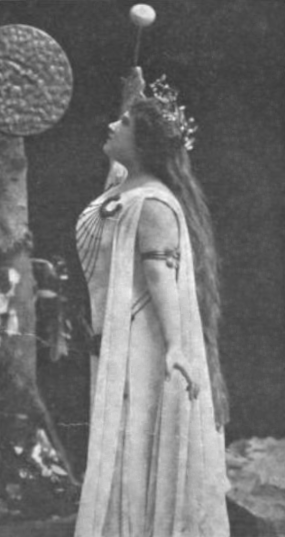
Ester Mazzoleni

Ester Mazzoleni (12 March 1883 – 17 May 1982) was an Italian soprano active on the opera stage from 1906 until her retirement in 1926. She continued to periodically sing in concerts until 1939. In her later life she had a distinguished career as a voice teacher at the Palermo Conservatory from 1929 through 1953. Her voice is preserved on several recordings made with Fonotipia Records. She died in 1982 at the age of 99. A singing prize named for Mazzoleni is given out annually in Palermo.

According to musicologist Leo Riemens and music biographer Karl-Josef Kutsch, Mazzoleni "possessed a dramatic soprano voice, in which masterful vocal technique and intensity of expression complemented each other." Music critic J. B. Steane stated that Mazzoleni "sang and acted in a highly charged, emotional style, her voice vibrant and her treatment of the vocal line emphatic, so that her many recordings offer some excitement as well as instructive demonstration of the methods of another age." She was highly regarded for her performances in operas of the bel canto era of the early 19th century, and in the operas of Giuseppe Verdi.

== Early life and education ==
The daughter of Paolo Mazzoleni and his wife Filomena Mazzoleni (née Rossini), Ester Mazzoleni was born on 12 March 1883 in Sebenico, Kingdom of Italy in what is today Šibenik, Croatia. Her parents were wealthy, and musical talent ran in the family. Her uncle was the operatic baritone Francesco Mazzoleni. Her cousin, Ida Mazzoleni, also had a career as a soprano.

While receiving a general education in her youth Mazzoleni studied music in Trieste with nuns at the convent attached to the Congregation of Our Lady of Sion and at the Conservatorio di Sant'Anna in Pisa. In both cities she sang sacred music for events attached to the Roman Catholic. She studied opera initially with A. Ravasio in her native city, and gave her first public performance while quite young at the Sociale di Sebenico. However, music at this point was a hobby and she was originally interested in pursuing a career as a painter rather than a musician.

In 1906 Mazzoleni traveled to Milan to train as an artist. She was drawn to singing after being encouraged in that direction while traveling in Italy; with a chance encounter with the conductor Rodolfo Ferrari of the Teatro Costanzi reorienting her life into a career in opera. She later was a private voice student of Amelia Pinto.

== Career ==
With the backing of Ferrari, Mazzoleni made her professional opera debut in 1906 at the Teatro Costanzi in Rome as Leonora in Il Trovatore. She was head later that year at the same theatre as Rachel in Fromental Halévy's La Juive and Fricka in Richard Wagner's Das Rheingold. In November 1906 she gave her first performance in Milan at the Teatro Dal Verme as Bathsheba in Amintore Galli David, and the following month performed for the first time at the Teatro Petruzzelli as Amelia in Giuseppe Verdi's Un ballo in maschera. She returned to the Teatro Petruzzelli the following year as Stephana in Umberto Giordano's Siberia.

Mazzoleni had a rapid rise on the Italian stage; appearing in that nation's major opera houses. She sang the title roles in Alfredo Catalani's Loreley, Giacomo Puccini's Tosca and Verdi's Aida at multiple opera houses in 1907, including the Teatro Politeama, Lecce, Teatro Verdi, Brindisi, the Teatro Regio, Parma and at the Politeama Rossetti. On January 18, 1908 she gave her first performance at La Scala under the baton of Arturo Toscanini as Isabella I of Castile in Alberto Franchetti's Cristoforo Colombo. Later that year she made her debut at the Teatro Massimo in the title role of La Gioconda.

Mazzoleni was a regular performer at La through 1917. At La Scala she had triumphs in two rarely staged operas; portraying Julia in Gaspare Spontini's La vestale in 1908, and the title role in Italy's first staging of Luigi Cherubini's Médée (1909). Other roles she sang at La Scala included Leonora in Verdi's La forza del destino (1908), Francesca in Luigi Mancinelli's Paolo e Francesca (1908), Elena in Verdi's I vespri siciliani (1909), Amazily in Fernand Cortez (1916), Elvira in Ernani (1917), Violetta in La traviata (1917), and the title role in Lucrezia Borgia (1917) among others.

In 1910 Mazzoleni performed the title role in Vincenzo Bellini's Norma for the first time at the Teatro Comunale di Bologna. She later returned to that opera house in 1913 to give her first performance of Giselda in Verdi's I Lombardi alla prima crociata. In 1910-1911 she appeared at the Teatro Lirico Giuseppe Verdi in performances of La vestale. In 1911 she returned to the Teatro Costanzi as Valentine in Meyerbeer's Les Huguenots. In 1912 she gave her first performance at La Fenice as Elisabeth of Valois in Verdi's Don Carlos; a part that became one of her most beloved roles.

In 1913 she sang the title role of Aida for the inaugural performance of the newly created Arena di Verona Festival (AVF) with Giovanni Zenatello as her Radamès. She was later honored at the 50th anniversary festival of the AVF. She portrayed the part of Amelia in Giuseppe Verdi's Un ballo in maschera at the Teatro Dal Verme in 1915, and returned to that house the following year as Leonora in Verdi's Il trovatore. In 1923 she returned to the AVF as Bellini's Norma. Other roles in her repertoire included Damara in Adriano Lualdi's La figlia del re, Isolde in Tristan und Isolde, Selika in Meyerbeer's L'Africaine, Teresa in Arturo Berutti's Los Héroes, Valentine in Meyerbeer's Les Huguenots, and the title role in Dejanice.

Mazzoleni also performed as a guest artist in opera houses in South America, Portugal, France, Hungary, and Spain. In 1909 she performed the title role of La vestale for her debut at the Paris Opera; a role in which she had a critical success at the Teatro Colón in Argentina in 1910. In 1913 she portrayed Mimì in La bohème and the title role in Tosca at the Coliseu dos Recreios in Lisbon. In 1918 she portrayed Alice Ford in Verdi's Falstaff at the Teatro Real in Madrid, and in 1919 she returned to the Teatro Colón in Buenos Aires in the title role of Puccini's Suor Angelica.

== Later life ==
Mazzoleni retired from opera performance in 1926; a decision made following her marriage that year to Giovan Battista Cavarretta. She occasionally still sang in concerts up until 1939. After leaving the stage, she was active as a voice teacher in Palermo; notably serving as chair of the vocal music program at the Palermo Conservatory from 1929 to 1953. She concurrently held the post of chair of opera performances at the Accademia Musicale Chigiana in Sienna from 1939 to 1942.

Mazzoleni died in Palermo on May 17, 1982 shortly before her 100th birthday. A singing prize named for Ester Mazzoleni is given out in the city of Palermo every year in her memory. In 1942 she was part of commission established by Italy's Ministry of Public Education that was tasked with revising the singing instruction methods employed in Italy's schools.
