= Luca Antignani =

- Born: 1976 (age 49–50); Italy
- Genre: Contemporary classical
- Occupation: Composer
- Label: Suvini Zerboni
- Website: lucaantignani.net

Luca Antignani (born 1976 in Italy) is an Italian composer of contemporary classical music. He also teaches various theory music classes in Switzerland and France.

== Life ==
Luca Antignani graduated in piano, orchestral conducting, electronic music and composition at the Scuola Civica "Claudio Abbado" in Milan, at the Accademia Nazionale of Santa Cecilia in Rome and at the IRCAM in Paris. His compositions have been committed by prestigious institutions and performed in several international music festivals such as the Biennale (Venice), Teatro dell'Opera, MiTo, Accademia Nazionale di Santa Cecilia (Rome), Nouvel Ensemble Moderne (Montréal), Opéra Comique, Radio France, Présences, Résonances and Agora (Paris), Orchestra della RAI (Turin), Orchestre des Pays de Savoie (Annecy), Opéra, Orchestre National, Société de Musique de Chambre, Festival Biennale en Musiques, Ensemble Orchestral Contemporain and Chœur Britten (Lyon), Musica (Strasbourg), Les Musiques, Orchestre des Jeunes de la Méditerranée (Marseille), Dresdner Musikfestspiele (Dresde), and numerous other cities such as San Francisco, Philadelphia, Bloomington, Ithaca (USA), Tallinn (Estonia) and Rostock (Germany). Several works by Antignani have been broadcast on TV by RAI and by numerous national radios (like Radio France and Radio Canada).

He currently teaches orchestration at the Lyon CNSMD (France) as well as contemporary music and orchestration at the Haute École de Musique de Lausanne (Suisse). His scores are edited by Edizioni Suvini Zerboni (Milano).

== Honors and awards ==
- Winner of the international composition competition GRAME / EOC of Lyon (France) (2008)
- 3rd prize in the international composition competition Molinari of Montréal (Canada) (2006)
- Winner of the international composition competition Barlow Prize (USA) (2005)
- 2nd prize in the international composition competition Méditerranéen Music Centre of Lamia (Greece) (2004)
- 1st prize in the international composition competition Città di Como (Italy) (2003)
- 1st prize in the international composition competition Fattoria Paradiso (Italy) (2002)
- 2nd prize (1st prize not assigned) in the international composition competition Guido d'Arezzo (Italy) (2001)

== Works ==
Selected works include:

- Azulejos (2014) for harp
- Il canto della pietra (2004) for cello
- Reiten, reiten, reiten (2004) for guitar
- Overlook Hotel (2002) for accordion and live electronics
- The icy light of the moon (1998) for piano
- Là et ailleurs (2003) for choir and orchestra
- Und dieses einen Weges kamen sie (1998) for guitar
- Un regard dans l'onde (2013-2014) for soprano, flute and accordion
- As the fainting Bee (2014) for soprano, violin, viola and cello
- Batte botte (2013) for children (or women) choir
- Litanie briganti (2015) for flute, oboe, clarinet, basson, horn, trumpet, trombone and piano
- Trio del sogno e del gabbiano (2014) for violin, cello and piano
- Etude sur "La vie" (2012) for cimbalom, flute, clarinet, violin, viola and cello
- Nix et nox (2012) for flute, clarinet, violin and cello
- Il re della foresta (2008) for string quartet
- Il Giuoco delle perle di vetro (2006) for 2 flutes, 2 Oboes, 2 Clarinets, horn, trumpet, trombone, tuba, 2 percussions, harp, piano, 2 violins, 2 viole, cello and double bass
- Giselle... (2021) transcription of Giselle by Adolphe Adam for 1 flute, 1 harpe, 1 violin and 1 saxophone for François Gremaud's theater production Giselle...
- Carmen. (2023) transcription of Carmen by Gerges Bizet for 1 flute, 1 harpe, 1 violin, 1 saxophone and 1 accordeon for François Gremaud's theater production Carmen.

== Discography ==
Selected recordings include:

- Frasi nella luce nascente on Ema, Vinci
- Azulejos on Continuo Classics
- Forum 2000/2002 on Atma
- Voix de Strass
- Concourse Molinari 2005/2006
