= Beniamino Carelli =

Italian singing teacher and composer

Beniamino Carelli (9 May 1833 – 14 February 1921) was an Italian singing teacher and composer.

Carelli was born in Naples on 9 May 1833 and was educated at the Naples Conservatory. There he studied piano with Francesco Lanza, harmony with Federico Parisi, counterpoint with Carlo Conti, singing with A. Busti, and music composition with Saverio Mercadante.

Carelli spent many years teaching at the Conservatory of San Pietro a Majella. One of the most sought after vocal teachers in Italy during the late 19th century and early 20th century, his pupils included opera singers Pasquale Amato, Giannina Arangi-Lombardi, Francesco Maria Bonini, Maria Capuana, Fernando De Lucia, Franco Lo Giudice, Riccardo Martin, and Raimund von zur-Mühlen, among others. His book, L'Arte del canto: metodo teorico-pratico (188?), remains an important text on the art of singing.

His daughter, Emma Carelli, also studied under him and had a successful career as a dramatic soprano before taking over the management of the Rome Opera House in 1912-1926.

== Sources ==
- Tosti by Francesco Sanvitale
