= Amelia Pinto =

Italian operatic soprano

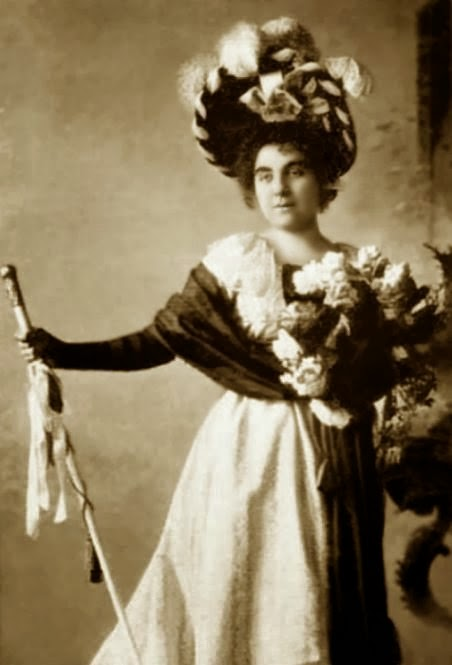
Amelia Pinto as Tosca (1899)

Amelia Pinto (1876–1946) was an Italian operatic soprano who first performed at the Teatro Grande in Brescia in December 1899 in La Gioconda. She developed a particular liking for Wagner, excelling in Tristan and Isolda at La Scala. She is also remembered for her interpretation of Tosca, appreciated by Puccini himself.

== Biography ==
Born in Palermo on 21 January 1876, Amelia Pinto was the daughter of Giuseppe Mancuso, a fencing master, and his wife Francesca. Thanks to her father who was interested in music, she took piano lessons as a child. In 1897, when she was 21, she began studying at the Conservatorio di San Pietro a Majella in Naples but the following year, her family sent her to the Santa Cecilia music school in Rome where she studied mezzosoprano singing under Zaira Cortini Falchi.

She made her début on 29 December 1899 at the Teatro Grande in Brescia where her dramatic qualities were noted as she sang in Amilcare Ponchielli's La Gioconda. The following February she took the role of Zuana in Stanislao Falchi's Tartini, o Il trillo del Diavolo. In September 1900, she proved to be a resounding success in Puccini's Tosca, capturing the composer's admiration. As a result, she was invited to perform the female title role in Wagner's Tristan and Isolda at its Milan première. Old recordings of her Isolda testify to the strength of Pinto's voice but also to her modulated and controlled penetrating treble.

In February 1901, at a commemorative concert for Verdi, together with Enrico Caruso, she sang in the Act II finale of La forza del destino. After a period in Argentina, that December she played Brünnhilde in Wagner's Die Walküre. On 11th March 1902, she sang in the premiere of Alberto Franchetti's Germania with Enrico Caruso and Mario Sammarco. Later that year she performed in Tristan and Isolde in Ravenna before travelling to the United States with Pietro Mascagni's opera company to perform in Cavalleria rusticana and Zanetto. In 1903 she sang Desdemona in Francesco Tamagno’s farewell performance of Otello at the Teatro Argentina in Rome. After performing in Palermo in 1904, she went on tour to Egypt, singing in Gabriel Dupont's La Cabrera. The following year she sang in the Paris premiere of Umberto Giordano's Siberia, then in Madrid in L'Africaine and La Gioconda. In 1906, in Santiago de Chile, she performed in Otello, Il trovatore and Les Huguenots.

She sang at the Teatro Colón, Buenos Aires, in 1908 and then at the end of the season married a Sicilian doctor and retired from the stage. She returned to the stage at La Scala in 1914 to sing Tristan und Isolde under Arturo Toscanini, and accepted a season in Madrid in 1916, appearing in La Gioconda, Tristan and Isolde and Die Walküre. Following the death of her daughter Rosa Isotta in 1917, she retired definitively.

Amelia Pinto died in Palermo on 21 June 1946 after a serious illness.

== Recordings ==
Pinto made 18 published records over the period 1902-1914. She recorded 6 sides for G&T in 1902, including an aria from Germania, and 2 versions of Vissi d'arte from Tosca. 4 sessions for Fonotipia in 1908 produced only 3 published sides, including one from Siberia. She returned to the Fonotipia studios in 1914 when she recorded 9 more published records, including souvenirs of her Isolde and Eva (from Die Meistersinger von Nürnberg).
