= Giannina Arangi-Lombardi =

Italian operatic soprano

Giannina Arangi-Lombardi (20 June 1891, Marigliano – 9 July 1951, Milan) was a spinto soprano, particularly associated with the Italian operatic repertory.

== Life and career ==
After studies in Naples at the Conservatory of San Pietro a Majella with Beniamino Carelli, she made her debut in Rome in 1920, singing mezzo-soprano roles for the next three years. After further studies with the retired singers Adelina Stehle and Tina Poli-Randaccio, she made a second debut as a soprano in 1923. She sang at the Teatro alla Scala in Milan from 1924 to 1930, making her debut as Elena in Boito's Mefistofele, under the baton of Arturo Toscanini. Rapidly invited to all the great opera houses of Europe, although she never appeared in Paris or London, she also sang to great acclaim in South America. She was chosen by Dame Nellie Melba to take part in her farewell tour of Australia in 1928. The tour included Arangi-Lombardi creating the title role in the Australian premiere of Puccini's Turandot.

Arangi-Lombardi was especially renowned in roles such as La vestale, Lucrezia Borgia, La Gioconda, and Aida. She sang in the first Italian performance of Ariadne auf Naxos. She appeared at the Salzburg Festival in 1935 but retired from the stage, while still in good voice, three years later. She then taught at the Music Conservatory in Milan, and later in Ankara, where Leyla Gencer was a pupil.

== Death ==
She died in Milan in 1951 shortly after her 60th birthday from undisclosed causes.

== Legacy ==
Arangi-Lombardi can be heard to impressive effect in four complete opera recordings: Aida (1928), Cavalleria Rusticana (1930), La Gioconda (1931), and Mefistofele (1931).

== Sources ==
- Le guide de l'opéra, les indispensables de la musique, R. Mancini & J-J. Rouvereux, (Fayard, 1986), ISBN 2-213-01563-5
