= Antonino Calcagnadoro =

Italian painter

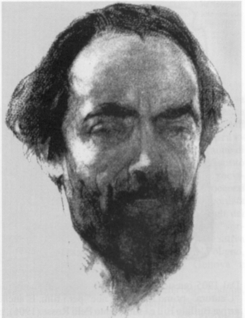
Antonino Calcagnadoro

Antonino Calcagnadoro (February 12, 1876 – 1935) was an Italian painter.

== Biography ==
Born in Rome, he initially trained with his father, an ornamental painter. He then studied at the Institute of Fine Arts in Rome (1894–1898). He often painted subjects of social discomfort among the poor, including Emigranti, and I disoccupati that won a gold medal at the 1904 Florentine Exposition.

In Rieti, he painted a number of fresco decorations, including in the Casa Matricardi, Casa San Rufo, and the Chapel of the Crucifix in the City Cathedral, and the former Courthouse (Palazzo Sanizi). He helped decorate the Foyer of the Flavio Vespasiano Theater in Rieti.

Many of his works are exhibited in the Museo Comunale of Rieti. The schools for arts in Rieti, part of the Istituto di Istruzione Superiore Marco Terenzio Varrone are named after Calcagnadoro.

He died in Rome in 1935.

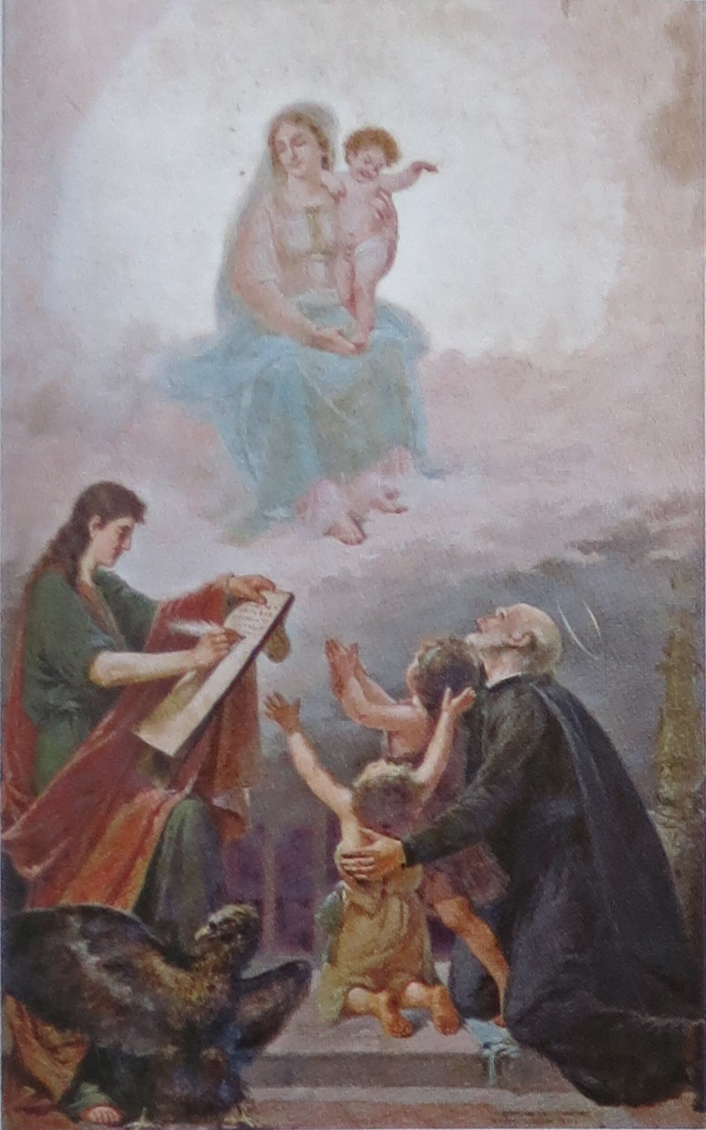
L'apparizione della Vergine a San Giovanni Evangelista e a San Giuseppe Calasanzio (1903), oil on canvas, preserved at Chiesa di Santa Scolastica in Rieti

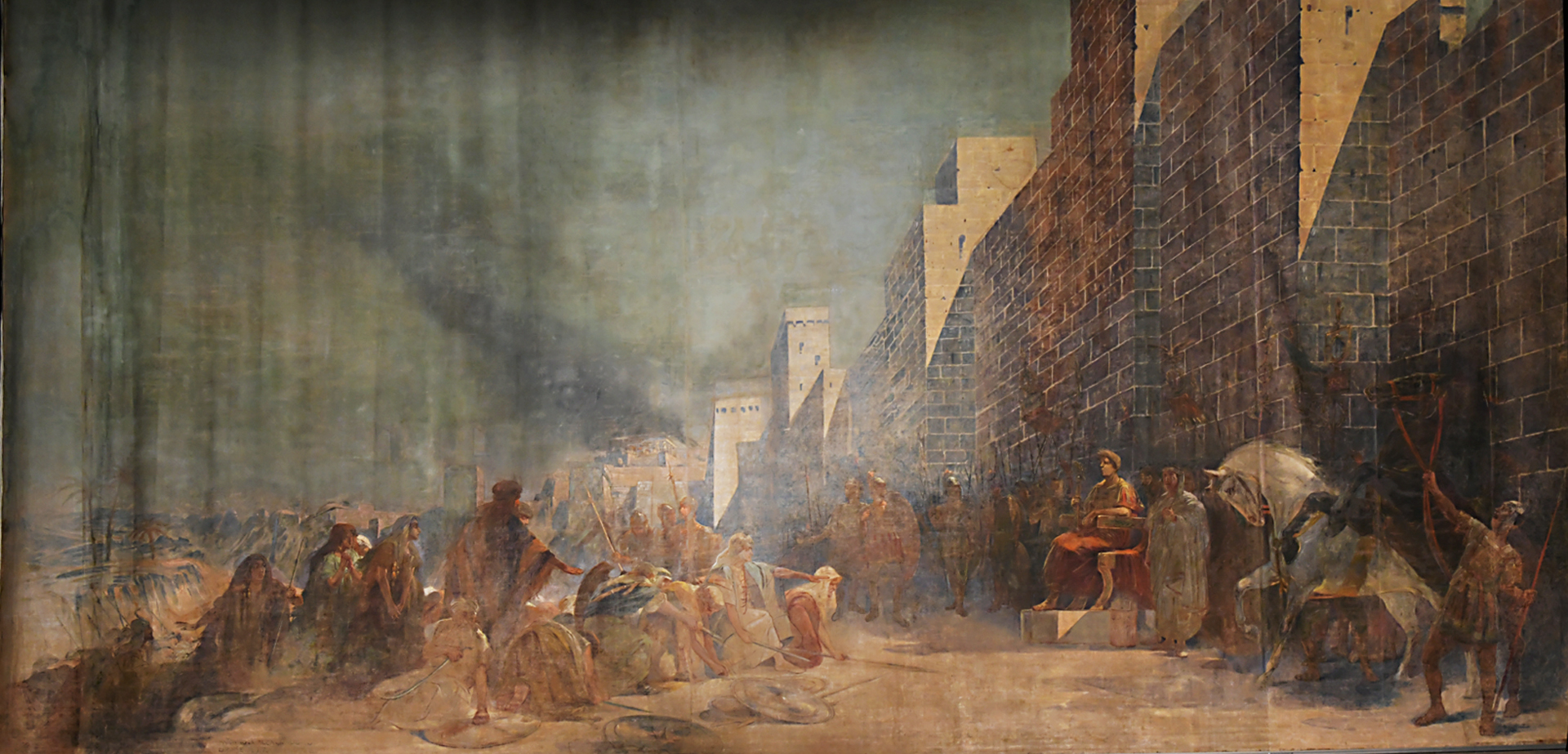
La Resa di Gerusalemme a Vespasiano (1910), tempera painted on the curtain of the Teatro Flavio Vespasiano in Rieti
