= Thaïs (opera) =

Opera by Jules Massenet

- comédie lyrique by Jules Massenet
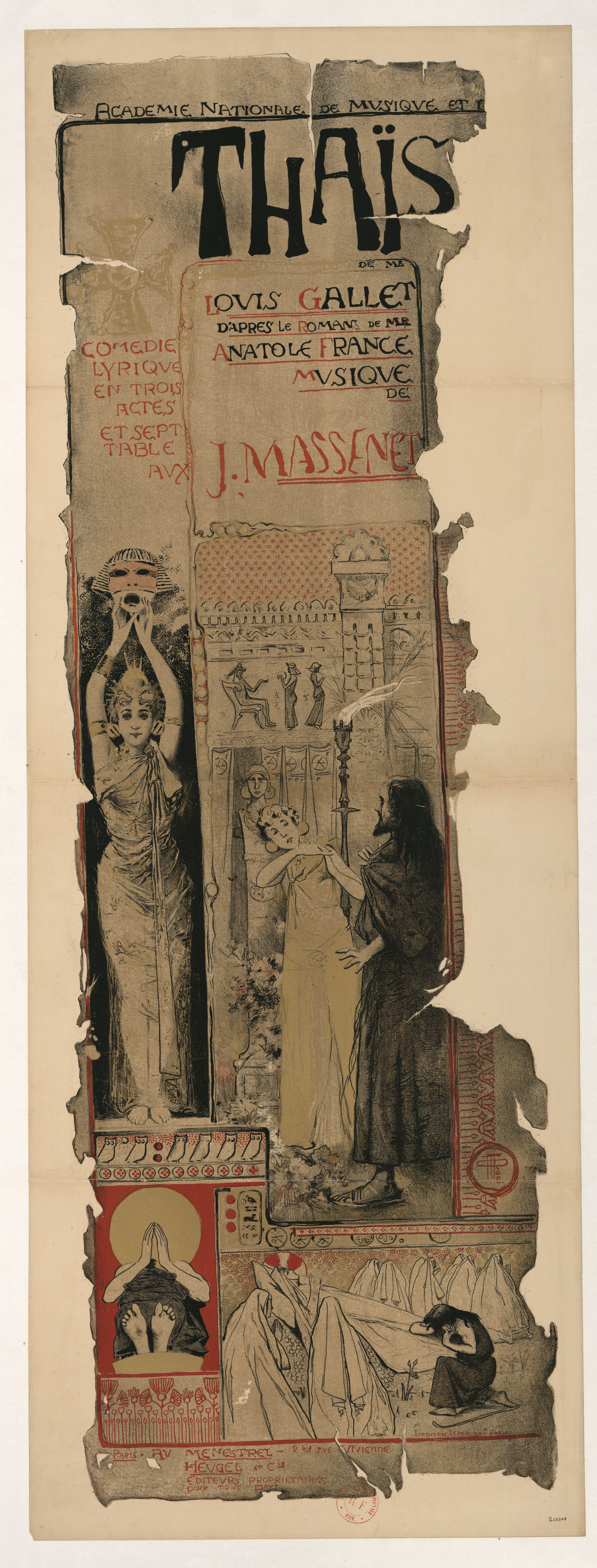
- Original poster, design by Manuel Orazi
- Librettist: Louis Gallet
- Language: French
- Based on: novel Thaïs by Anatole France
- Premiere: 16 March 1894; Opéra Garnier, Paris

Thaïs (French pronunciation: [ta.is]) is an opera, a comédie lyrique in three acts and seven tableaux, by Jules Massenet to a French libretto by Louis Gallet, based on the novel Thaïs by Anatole France. It was first performed at the Opéra Garnier in Paris on 16 March 1894, starring the American soprano Sibyl Sanderson, for whom Massenet had written the title role. The original production was directed by Alexandre Lapissida, with costumes designed by Charles Bianchini and sets by Marcel Jambon (act 1, scene 1; act 3) and Eugène Carpezat (act 1, scene 2; act 2). The opera was later revised by the composer and was premiered at the same opera house on 13 April 1898.

The work was first performed in Italy at the Teatro Lirico Internazionale in Milan on 17 October 1903 with Lina Cavalieri in the title role and Francesco Maria Bonini as Athanaël. In 1907, the role served as Mary Garden's American debut in New York in the U.S. premiere performance.

Thaïs takes place in Egypt under the rule of the Roman Empire, where a Cenobite monk, Athanaël, attempts to convert Thaïs, an Alexandrian courtesan and devotee of Venus, to Christianity, but discovers too late that his obsession with her is rooted in lust; while the courtesan's true purity of heart is revealed, so is the religious man's baser nature. The work is often described as bearing a sort of religious eroticism, and has had many controversial productions. Its famous Méditation, the entr'acte for violin and orchestra played between the scenes of act 2, is an oft-performed concert music piece; it has been arranged for many different instruments.

The role of Thaïs, similar to another Massenet heroine also written for Sibyl Sanderson, Esclarmonde, is notoriously difficult to sing and is reserved for only the most gifted of performers. Modern interpreters have included Carol Neblett, Anna Moffo, Beverly Sills, Leontyne Price, Renée Fleming, and Elizabeth Futral. Géori Boué was the first to record the opera, in 1952.

== Differences between two versions ==
In the 1894 version the end of act 1, the supposed striptease of Thaïs (which caused a great scandal on the first night due to a mishap with Sibyl Sanderson's costume) is a long symphonic interlude "L'amours d'Aphrodite" that leads without a break into act 2 and the scene with the mirror aria "Dis-moi que je suis belle". In the first edition vocal score, this is 18 pages – 196 bars – almost a fifth of the entire first act. There is a strangely experimental middle section, that is in an amorphous 5/4 time signature (unusual for Massenet) with a sultry whole-tone feel. In 1898 this was cut, though the climax is retained in part as the peroration for act 1 – a mere 17 bars.

In Thaïs's famous Mirror Aria at the opening of act 2 there are some text changes, though this does not affect the music.

In the 1898 revision, there is an extended ballet sequence in act 2 for Nicias' followers, including the little vocal intermezzo for La charmeuse. This replaced the 1894 ballet in the last act. The 1898 ballet is entirely new music.

The most comprehensive revisions concern the final act, act 3. In 1894, there is no scene at the Oasis, the act opens with the monks in the Thébaïde. When Athanaël falls asleep there is an extended ballet sequence "Les Sept esprits de la Tentation" – which is modeled on Flaubert's epic poem La tentation de Saint Antoine. In it Athanaël is tormented by spirit voices, La perdition, L'étoile de la rédemption (star of redemption), Les sphinges (Sphinxes), Âmes perdues (lost souls) and Esprits de L'abîme (spirits of the abyss) culminating in an orgiastic black sabbath.

This was cut. The first scene becomes scene 2. The new scene 1 (the Oasis scene) shows Athanaël delivering Thaïs to Mère Albine and les filles blanches, and leaving her.

1894: In the final scene, after the famous final duet "Te souvient-il du lumineux voyage" there is extra music and text. Voices from heaven curse Athanaël, Mère Albine and the nuns cry out Un vampire and run away (as in the final chapter of the Anatole France novel) and the opera concludes with voices of angels calling Pitié and a soft reminiscence of the famous Méditation. In 1898, this is all cut and reduced to Athanaël's single cry of Pitié and a brief three bar coda.

| | | Original version (1894) | Revised version (1898) |
|---|---|---|---|
| Act 1 | Scene 1 | The Thébaïde | The Thébaïde |
| Act 1 | Scene 2 | Alexandria – followed by a poéme symphonique 'L'amours d'Aphrodite' that segues into act 2 without a break | Alexandria |
| Act 2 | Scene 1 | At the House of Thaïs | At the House of Thaïs |
| Act 2 | Scene 2 | Before the House of Thaïs | Before the House of Thaïs (Ballet: Nos. 1–7) |
| Act 3 | Scene 1 | The Thébaïde | The Oasis |
| Act 3 | Scene 2 | La Tentation | The Thébaïde (formerly scene 1) |
| Act 3 | Scene 3 | The Death of Thaïs | The Death of Thaïs |

== Roles ==
Roles, voice types, premiere cast
| Role | Voice type | Premiere cast, 16 March 1894 Conductor: Paul Taffanel |
|---|---|---|
| Thaïs, a courtesan | soprano | Sibyl Sanderson |
| Athanaël, a Cenobite monk | baritone | Jean-François Delmas |
| Nicias, a nobleman | tenor | Albert Alvarez |
| Crobyle, servant of Nicias | soprano | Jeanne Marcy |
| Myrtale, servant of Nicias | mezzo-soprano | Meyrianne Héglon |
| Palémon, leader of the Cenobites | bass | François Delpouget |
| Albine, an abbess | mezzo-soprano | Laure Beauvais |
| A servant | bass | Euzet |
Cenobites, Nuns, Citizens of Alexandria, Nicias's friends.

== Synopsis ==
=== Act 1 ===
Scene 1

A group of Cenobite monks go about their daily business. Athanaël, the most rigorous ascetic of them all, enters and confesses to the senior monk, Palémon, that he has lately been disturbed by visions of a courtesan and priestess of Venus named Thaïs, whom he had seen many years ago in his native city of Alexandria. Believing these visions to be a sign from God, he resolves, against Palémon's advice, to return to Alexandria, convert Thaïs to Christianity, and persuade her to enter a convent.

Scene 2

Athanaël arrives in Alexandria and visits his old friend Nicias, a wealthy voluptuary. Nicias welcomes him with open arms and reveals himself to be Thaïs's current lover. Upon hearing Athanaël's plan, he laughs and warns him that the revenge of Venus can be terrible. Nevertheless, he procures clothing for his friend in preparation for a feast that evening at which Thaïs will appear. His slaves, Crobyle and Myrtale, dress Athanaël and mock his prudery.

The feast begins. Thaïs arrives and sings a bittersweet love duet with Nicias: this is their last night together. She then asks him about Athanaël, who overhears her and tells her that he has come to teach her "contempt for the flesh and love of pain." Not tempted by this proposition, she offends his sense of propriety with a seductive song. He leaves, angrily promising to come back later, while she taunts him with a parting shot: "Dare to come, you who defy Venus!" and begins to disrobe as the curtain falls.

=== Act 2 ===
Scene 1

Méditation
Performed by Bomsori Kim and Pallavi Mahidhara

Exhausted after the feast, Thaïs expresses dissatisfaction with her empty life and muses on the fact that one day, old age will destroy her beauty. Athanaël enters at this vulnerable moment, praying to God to conceal her beauty from him. He tells her that he loves her according to the spirit rather than the flesh, and that his love will last forever instead of a single night. Intrigued, she asks him to teach her the ways of this love. He nearly succumbs to her physical charm, but succeeds in explaining to her that if she converts, she will gain eternal life. She nearly succumbs to his eloquence, but then reasserts her nihilistic worldview and drives him away. However, after a long meditation she changes her mind.

Scene 2

Thaïs has joined Athanaël and resolved to follow him into the desert. He orders her to burn down her house and possessions in order to destroy all traces of her wicked past. She agrees, but asks if she can keep a statuette of Eros, the god of love, explaining to Athanaël that she sinned against love rather than through it. When he hears that Nicias gave it to her, however, Athanaël demands that she destroy it. Nicias appears with a group of revelers, who see Athanaël taking Thaïs away. Furious, they begin to stone him. Although Nicias is astonished at Thaïs' decision to leave, he respects it and throws handfuls of money to distract the crowd. Thaïs and Athanaël escape.

=== Act 3 ===
Scene 1

Thaïs and Athanaël travel on foot through the desert. Thaïs is exhausted, but Athanaël forces her to keep going and thus do penance for her sins. They reach a spring, where Athanaël begins to feel pity rather than disgust for her, and they share a few moments of idyllic, platonic companionship as they rest. Shortly afterwards, they reach the convent where Thaïs is to stay. Placing her in the care of Mother Superior Albine, Athanaël realizes that he has accomplished his mission – and that he will never see her again.

Scene 2

The Cenobite monks express anxiety over Athanaël's asocial and morose behavior since his return from Alexandria. Athanaël enters and confesses to Palémon that he has begun to experience sexual longing for Thaïs. Palémon castigates him for having attempted to convert her in the first place. Athanaël falls into a depressed sleep and has an erotic vision of Thaïs. He tries to seize her, but she laughingly evades him. Then, a second vision tells him that Thaïs is dying.

Scene 3

Feeling that existence is worth nothing without her, he repudiates all his vows and rushes off to find her. He reaches the convent and finds her on her deathbed. He tells her that all he taught her was a lie, that "nothing is true but life and the love of human beings", and that he loves her. Blissfully unaware, she describes the heavens opening and the angels welcoming her into their midst. She dies, and Athanaël collapses in despair.

== Noted arias ==
- "Voilà donc la terrible cité" (Athanaël) – act 1
- "Dis-moi que je suis belle" (Thaïs) – act 2
- "C'est toi, mon père" (Thaïs, Athanaël) – act 3

== Recordings ==
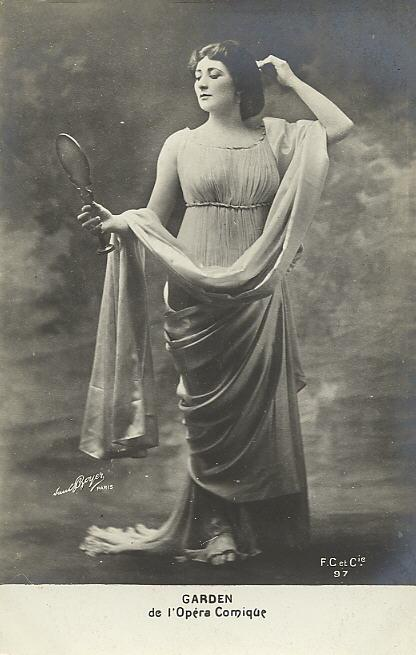
Mary Garden in the opera Thaïs

- 1952 – Géori Boué, Roger Bourdin, Jean Giraudeau – Choeurs et Orchestre de l'Opéra de Paris, Georges Sébastian
- 1959 – Andrée Esposito, Robert Massard, Jean Mollien – French National Radio Orchestra and Chorus, Albert Wolff (Chant du Monde)
- 1961 – Renée Doria, Robert Massard, Michel Sénéchal – Choeurs et Orchestre de Radio France, Jésus Etcheverry
- 1974 – Anna Moffo, Gabriel Bacquier, José Carreras – Ambrosian Opera Chorus, New Philharmonia Orchestra, Julius Rudel (RCA Red Seal)
- 1976 – Beverly Sills, Sherrill Milnes, Nicolai Gedda – John Alldis Choir, New Philharmonia Orchestra, Lorin Maazel (EMI)
- 1997 – Renée Fleming, Thomas Hampson, Giuseppe Sabbatini – Choeur et Orchestre National Bordeaux Aquitaine, Yves Abel (Decca)
- 2004 – Eva Mei, Michele Pertusi, William Joyner – Orchestra e Coro del Teatro La Fenice di Venezia (Dynamic Srl Italy, 2004)
- 2009 – Barbara Frittoli, Lado Ataneli, Stefano Poda (stage director), Orchestra and Chorus of the Teatro Regio (Turin) (ArtHaus), Gianandrea Noseda – DVD
- 2010 – Renée Fleming, Thomas Hampson, John Cox (director), Metropolitan Opera Orchestra, Chorus, and Ballet, Jesús López Cobos – DVD
- 2020 – Erin Wall, Joshua Hopkins, Andrew Staples, Toronto Mendelssohn Choir, Toronto Symphony Orchestra Andrew Davis – 2 CD's Chandos Records Cat:CHSA5258(2)

These are all of the revised, definitive 1898 version. There are no recordings of the original 1894 version. However, there are two recordings of the Thaïs ballet music which are of the original ballet music La tentation, though the recordings, confusingly, do not specify this.

- 1997 – Academy of St Martin in the Fields, Sir Neville Marriner (Capriccio)
- 2013 – Barcelona Symphony Orchestra, Patrick Gallois (Naxos)
