= Andrée Esposito =

French opera singer

Andrée Esposito (born 7 February 1934) is a French opera singer, a lyric soprano particularly associated with the French repertory and contemporary works.

== Biography ==
Andrée Esposito was born in Algiers, Algeria, into a family of French-Italian origin. She began her musical studies at the Music Conservatory of her native city, obtaining a first prize there. She completed her studies at the Paris Music Conservatory, where she was a pupil of Louis Noguéra and Charles Panzéra. She made her professional debut at Metz, as Suzel in Camille Erlanger's Le Juif Polonais.

Esposito was then quickly invited to all the major opera houses of France, including the Paris Opéra-Comique, singing the standard French light lyric repertory: Olympia in Les contes d'Hoffmann, Philline in Mignon, Mireille, Micaela in Carmen, Leila in Les pêcheurs de perles, Lakmé. She made her debut at the Paris Opéra in 1959, as Violetta in La traviata. Other roles there included, Rosina in Il barbiere di Siviglia, the title role in Lucia di Lammermoor, Gilda in Rigoletto, Xenia in Boris Godunov, Marguerite in Faust, Juliette in Roméo et Juliette, as well as Massenet's Manon and Thais.

She was also a very active recitalist, especially of French songs by Chausson and Duparc. She participated in the creation of many contemporary works, such as Le chevalier de neige by Delerue and Andrea del Sarto by Daniel-Lesur and performed The Mines of Sulphur by Bennett, and The Devils of Loudun by Penderecki.

She also enjoyed singing in operettas, such as Die Fledermaus, and The Merry Widow.

Esposito was married to French baritone Julien Haas, with whom she often appeared on stage; the two were also active as voice teachers at the Strasbourg Music Conservatory.

== Sources ==
- Alain Pâris, Dictionnaire des interprètes et de l’interprétation musicale au XX siècle (2 vols), Editions Robert Laffont (Bouquins, Paris 1982, 4th ed. 1995, 5th Edn 2004). ISBN 2-221-06660-X
