= Teatro Reinach =

Former theatre (1871–1944) in Parma, Italy

Coordinates: 44°48′17″N 10°19′38″E

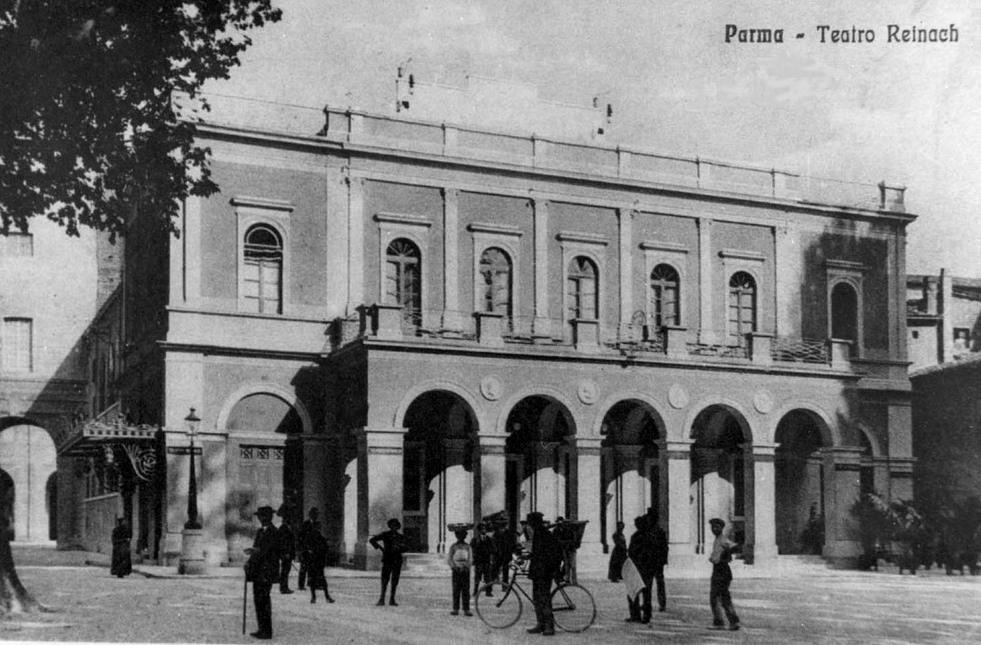
Teatro Reinach

The Teatro Reinach (also known as the Politeama Reinach, since 1939: Teatro Paganini) was a theater in Parma, Italy, that was designed by architect Pancrazio Soncini. Built in 1871, the venue was host to performance of operas, ballets, plays, and concerts. It was destroyed in 1944 during an air raid in World War II.
