= Lorenzo Filiasi =

Italian composer

Lorenzo Filiasi (25 March 1878, Naples – 30 July 1963, Rome) was an Italian composer. His opera Manuel Menendez won the Sonzongo publisher's composition competition in 1904. This led to the work's premiere at the Teatro Lirico in Milan on 15 May 1904. Popularly received, the opera was mounted by opera houses throughout Italy, including the Teatro Costanzi in Rome and the Teatro di San Carlo in Naples in 1905. His opera Fior di Neve was given its premiere at La Scala on 1 April 1911 and his opera Mattutino d'Assisi premiered at the Teatro di San Carlo on 16 January 1941.

== Sources ==
- Blume, Friedrich (ed.), "Filiasi, Lorenzo", Die Musik in Geschichte und Gegenwart: allgemeine Enzyklopädie der Musik, Volume 16, Bärenreiter, 1979, p. 277.
- Casaglia, Gherardo (2005)."Lorenzo Filiasi". L'Almanacco di Gherardo Casaglia (in Italian).
