= Crowned heads of Europe (phrase) =

Term used to describe monarchs in Europe

Crowned heads of Europe is a phrase used to describe monarchs in Europe.

The phrase was used in Robert Plumer Ward's 1795 two-volume book, An Enquiry Into the Foundation and History of the Law of Nations in Europe.

The painting on the side of Professor Marvel's coach in the film The Wizard of Oz reads, "Acclaimed by the Crowned Heads of Europe."

In 1952 the Chicago Tribune used the phrase "Crowned heads of Europe" to describe the mourners at the funeral of George VI that included Queen Juliana of the Netherlands, and the then Crown Prince Olav of Norway.

Monarchy researcher and historian, Rolf-Ulrich Kunze used the phrase when he said, "Every king or queen has the right to step down from the throne. If the pope can do it, so can the crowned heads of Europe."
