= Teatro Verdi (Padua) =

Theater in Padova, Italy

Coordinates: 45.4093°N 11.8715°E

The Teatro Verdi is a theater and opera house in Padua, Italy named after composer Giuseppe Verdi. Constructed in 1749–1751, the theater was inaugurated in 1751. It was modernized in 1884.

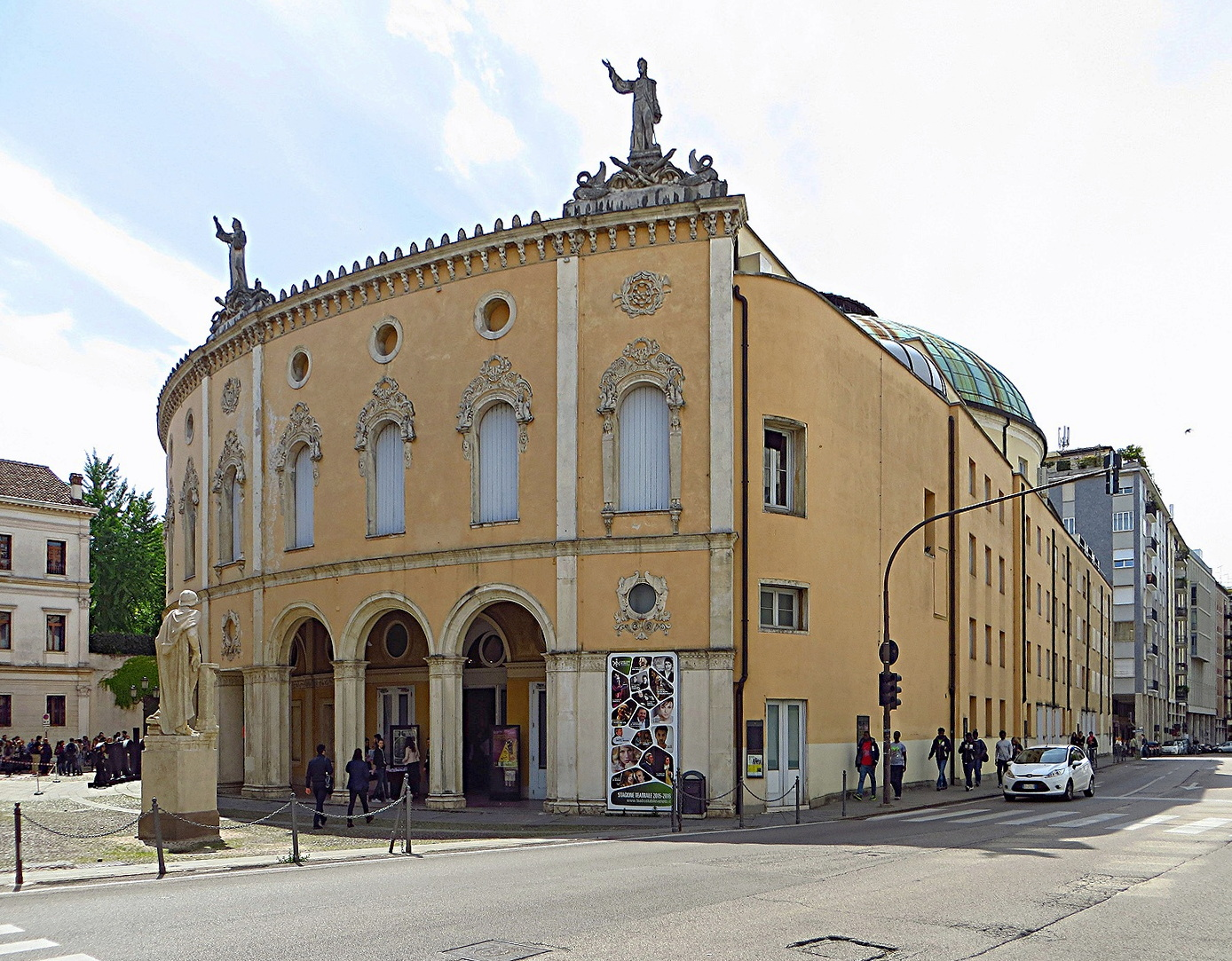
Teatro Verdi
