= Siberia (opera) =

Opera by Umberto Giordano

- Opera by Umberto Giordano
- Poster for the premiere performance
- Librettist: Luigi Illica
- Premiere: 19 December 1903; La Scala, Milan

Siberia is an opera in three acts by Umberto Giordano from a libretto by Luigi Illica. It premiered on 19 December 1903 at La Scala in Milan. There is no direct source for the plot of Siberia and it is quite possible that this is an original work by Illica. It was suggested at the New York premiere in 1908 that it was based on Leo Tolstoy's 1899 novel Resurrection or one of the stories within it.

== Performance history ==
The opera premiered on 19 December 1903 at La Scala in Milan. The première was not successful, despite having an illustrious first-night cast (Puccini's Madama Butterfly had been cancelled and Siberia took the same vocal distribution so the singers were re-engaged for Giordano's opera), and it received more praise in its opening in Genoa and then in Paris in May 1905. It was premièred in the US in New Orleans at the French Opera House on 31 January 1906. The composer Gabriel Fauré thought highly of the first act when he heard it in Paris in 1905. Cleofonte Campanini conducted its New York premiere at the Manhattan Opera House on 5 February 1908.

The composer revised and shortened the opera in 1927, and it was his favourite among his operas. The music critic of the New York Times Zachary Woolfe, commenting on a 2015 concert performance by Teatro Grattacielo in New York City, remarked that it hardly deserves its current obscurity.

== Roles ==
Roles, voice types, premiere cast
Role	Voice type	Premiere cast, 19 December 1903 Conductor: Cleofonte Campanini
Stephana	soprano	Rosina Storchio
Vassili	tenor	Giovanni Zenatello
Gleby	baritone	Giuseppe De Luca
Walitzin	bass	Vittorio Pozzi-Camola
Nikona, Stephana's godmother	mezzo-soprano	Palmira Maggi
The Girl	soprano	Emma Trentini
Prince Alexis	tenor	Oreste Gennari
Ivan	tenor	Emilio Venturini
Ipranivick	tenor	Federico Ferraresi
Walinoff	baritone	Pozzi-Camola
Miskinski	baritone	Antonio Pini-Corsi
Commissario	bass	Antonio Volponi

== Synopsis ==
Place: Russia
Time: First half of the 19th century

=== Act 1: "The Woman" ===
Saint Petersburg, August, during the Festival of Saint Alexander

Stephana is the mistress of Prince Alexis, living in an elegant palace, who was once seduced by Gleby, a scoundrel, who sold her to the Prince and has been living off a pension granted to him by the Prince. Stephana loves Vassili, a lieutenant who corresponds with her but assumes she is a simple working girl, because they always meet in disguise outside her house. When summoned to war he goes to meet Stephana and learns the truth about her, but he is still smitten with her. The Prince enters and demands an explanation which develops into a duel during which Vassili kills the Prince with his sword; he is detained and sent to the police.

=== Act 2: "The Lover" ===
The frontier between Russia and Siberia in winter

Several prisoners are making their way through the snow on foot to the mines where they are forced to work. Amongst them is Vassili worn almost out, he is despairing, a group of women and children are waiting along the road to bid farewell to the prisoners. Stephana arrives in a sleigh, she has left all to join her beloved in whatever fate awaits him, she does not listen to his pleas to return, when ordered to, they both march into the vastness of Siberia.

=== Act 3: "The Heroine" ===
A hut of convicts in the mines of Trans-Baikal on the eve of Russian Easter

Due to the upcoming festivities, the prisoners are allowed to organize a feast. Stephana, excited by this, devises a scheme with an old convict to escape with Vassili, but Gleby has arrived to the prison camp after finally being arrested in one of his many crimes. He recognizes Stephana and insults her in front of everybody, including Vassili, who tries to defend her but is stopped by the other inmates. The church bell rings and prayers start. During the night Vassili and Stephana execute their plan to escape, but Gleby gives the alarm, the troops pursue the prisoners and a shot is heard, they bring Vassili back and carry Stephana, who was wounded, she bids farewell to Vassili and dies.

== Recordings ==
The original cast members (Zenatello, Storchio, De Luca and Pini-Corsi) made a series of recordings of scenes and arias from the opera in 1903/1904 in Milan for the Gramophone & Typewriter Company.

- 2004: With Luisa Maragliano, Amedeo Zambo, Walter Monachesi. RAI Milan Orchestra and chorus, conductor: Danilo Bernardinelli (2 CD Bongiovanni, 2004. Recorded 5 February 1974).
- 2004: With Francesca Scaini, Jeon-Won Lee, Vittorio Vitelli. Orchestra Internazionale d'Italia, Bratislava Chamber Choir, conductor: Manlio Benzi (2 CD Dynamic, 2004. Recorded 2003).
- 2022: With Sonya Yoncheva, Giorgi Sturua, Caterina Piva, Antonio Garés, George Petean. Maggio Musicale Fiorentino Orchestra and chorus, conductor: Gianandrea Noseda (CD/DVD/Blu-ray Dynamic 2022. Recorded 7 July 2021).
- 2023 with Ambur Braid, Clarry Bartha, Alexander Mikhailov, Scott Hendricks, Fredrika Brillembourg, Wiener Symphoniker, Prague Philharmonic Choir. conductor Valentin Uryupin Stage Director: Vasily Barkhatov Bregenzer Festspiele DVD/Blu-Ray.C-Major
