= The Record of Singing =

Classical music compilation album

The Record of Singing is a compilation of classical-music singing from the first half of the 20th century, the era of the 78-rpm record.

It was issued on LP (with accompanying books) by EMI, successor to the Gramophone Company — perhaps the leading organization in the early history of audio recording.

The project was accompanied initially by two illustrated books, containing singers' biographies and appraisals, which were published in London, by Duckworth, in the late 1970s. It covers the period running from circa 1900, when the earliest recordings were made, through until the early 1950s, when the last 78-rpm records were produced. Singers are divided into groups arranged according to national 'schools' and fach or voice type. In practice, this means that there are separate Italian, German, French, Anglo-American and East European classifications.

Nonetheless, no such compilation can ever be exhaustive, and the project has sometimes been criticised for the omission of important performers who once enjoyed substantial careers and made notable contributions to the art of singing.

== Origins ==
The original idea for the series came from the collector Vivian Liff, who chose the recordings used in the first two volumes, almost all of which came from the Stuart-Liff Collection, as well as the photographs of the singers which were published in the books that accompanied volumes 1 and 2 of the project. Michael Scott was asked to write these two books. They contained brief singers' biographies, too and featured a critical (sometimes controversial) commentary (see below) about their accomplishments, as gleaned from certain discs they had made. Bryan Crimp of EMI was responsible for the transfers of the original recorded material to LP. Keith Hardwick, however, was responsible for the transfers, etc., on the final two volumes of the survey (which were not accompanied by books).

== Publication on LPs ==
EMI first released the collection on vinyl LP (long-playing) records.

Volume 1 first appeared in 1977, with a second edition in 1982 including corrections to the pitch of many of the recordings. The supplement also appeared around 1982. Volume 2 was published in 1979. Volume 3 and Volume 4 were released around 1984 and 1989 respectively.

The complete set was on 47 discs. Volumes 1, 2 and 3 each occupied 13, with Volume 4 having 8 discs. The original intention was apparently to produce 12 LPs per volume; but the selection of singers included in Volume 1 proved controversial, and an extra record (entitled a 'Supplement') was added to partly correct oversights. Volumes 2 and 3 were then assigned 13 records each.

== Compact discs ==
Volume 4 was republished on seven compact discs (CD) by EMI Classics under the title The Record of Singing Volume Four in 1991. This was not apparently a commercial success and the firm did not proceed to reissue the first three volumes in the same format.

Volume 3, however, was subsequently republished in 1999 on 10 CDs by Testament under the title The EMI Record of Singing Volume Three: 1926–1939. This was still available through retail outlets (as of 2010).

Two related sets, each containing 10 CDs, were issued by EMI Classics in 2009. The Record of Singing, 1899–1952: The Very Best of Vols. 1–4 consists of selections previously released in the original four volumes of LPs. The Record of Singing, Vol. 5: 1953–2007 – From the LP to the Digital Era is a new compilation which brings the series up to the present day. It has been criticised, however, for not being properly representative of non-EMI artists.

== MP3 download ==
Volume 2 is available as MP3 download on several internet platforms. The original LPs are now spread over 13 parts. Each part comes with an individual cover, resembling the original cover picture, but varying in color.

== Documentation ==
The collection was published with extensive documentation, including the numbers of the original recordings and full biographies of the singers.

The first two volumes were accompanied by books by Michael Scott:

- The Record of Singing to 1914, London, Duckworth, 1977, ISBN 978-0-7156-1030-5
- The Record of Singing Volume Two: 1914–1925, London, Duckworth, 1979, OCLC 6765624

They were republished in paperback by Northeastern University Press in 1993, ISBN 978-1-55553-163-8

(The books are still widely available from second hand book sellers.)

== The Record of Singing Volume 1 (1899–1919) ==
- The Castrato Voice: Alessandro Moreschi
- The Old School: Adelina Patti, Emma Albani, Marcella Sembrich
- Melba and the Marchesi Pupils: Nellie Melba, Sigrid Arnoldson, Emma Eames, Lillian Blauvelt, Suzanne Adams, Ellen Beach Yaw, Blanche Marchesi

=== English-speaking singers ===
- Dramatic sopranos: Agnes Nicholls, Lillian Nordica, Olive Fremstad, Susan Strong, Zélie de Lussan
- Lyric sopranos: Geraldine Farrar
- Contraltos: Louise Homer, Louise Kirkby Lunn, Clara Butt
- Tenors: Edward Lloyd, Ben Davies, Dan Beddoe, Evan Williams
- Baritones and basses: Charles Santley, George Henschel, Harry Plunket Greene, Robert Watkin-Mills, Andrew Black, David Bispham, Emilio de Gogorza, Clarence Whitehill

=== The French ===
- Tenors: Émile Scaremberg, Charles Dalmorès, Lucien Muratore, Charles Rousselière
- Lyric tenors: Victor Capoul, Edmond Clément, Adolphe Maréchal, Albert Vaguet
- High Cs and Heroic Voices: Léon Escalais, Agustarello Affré, Georges Imbart de la Tour, Albert Alvarez
- Baritones: Jean Lasalle, Victor Maurel, Maurice Renaud, Henri Albers, Jean Noté, Léon Melchissédec, Lucien Fugère, Gabriel Soulacroix, Jean Périer, Charles Gilibert
- Basses: Pol Plançon, Édouard de Reszke, Pedro Gailhard, Jean-François Delmas, Juste Nivette, Hippolyte Belhomme
- Dramatic Sopranos: Emma Calvé, Félia Litvinne, Aino Ackté, Mary Garden
- Lyric sopranos: Julia Guiraudon, Marguerite Carré, Lucette Korsoff, Lise Landouzy, Alice Verlet, Blanche Arral
- Contraltos: Blanche Deschamps-Jéhin, Marie Delna, Jeanne Gerville-Réache

=== The Emergence of Verismo ===
- 'La Gloria d'Italia': Mattia Battistini, Antonio Cotogni, Giuseppe Kaschmann, Francisco D'Andrade, Antonio Magini-Coletti, Giuseppe Pacini, Mario Ancona
- Scotti, de Luca and Pini-Corsi: Antonio Scotti, Giuseppe De Luca, Antonio Pini-Corsi
- Verismo triumphant: Eugenio Giraldoni, Mario Sammarco, Pasquale Amato, Titta Ruffo
- The basso: Francesco Navarini, Giovanni Gravina, Andres de Segurola, Adamo Didur
- Tradition and the Italian tenor: Francesco Marconi, Fernando Valero, Fernando De Lucia, Francesco Vignas, Florencio Constantino
- Lyric tenors: Alessandro Bonci, Giuseppe Anselmi, Aristodemo Giorgini, Edoardo Garbin
- Dramatic tenors: Francesco Tamagno, Giovanni de Negri, Giuseppe Borgatti, Fiorello Giraud, Amadeo Bassi, Giovanni Zenatello, Antonio Paoli, Enrico Caruso
- Sopranos 'B.C.': Ines de Frate, Elena Teodorini, Fanny Torresella, Medea Mei-Figner, Olimpia Boronat, Ada Adini
- After Cavalleria: Gemma Bellincioni, Angelica Pandolfini, Emma Carelli, Cesira Ferrani, Lina Cavalieri, Rosina Storchio, Solomiya Krushelnytska, Teresa Arkel, Amelia Pinto, Janina Korolewicz-Wayda
- Four dramatic sopranos: Maria de Macchi, Eugenia Burzio, Giannina Russ, Celestina Boninsegna
- Tetrazzini and some 'coloraturas': Luisa Tetrazzini, Regina Pacini, Josefina Huguet, Maria Galvany
- Italian contraltos: Guerrina Fabbri, Eugenia Mantelli, Armida Parsi-Pettinella, Maria Gay

=== Wagner and the German Style ===
- The instrumental example: Irene Abendroth, Margarethe Siems, Erika Wedekind, Hermine Bosetti, Marie Gutheil-Schoder, Hedwig Francillo-Kaufmann, Gertrude Förstel, Frieda Hempel, Selma Kurz
- Lilli Lehmann: Lilli Lehmann
- Sopranos of the Bayreuth school: Sophie Sedlmair, Pelagie Greef-Andriessen, Hatharina Senger-Bettaque, Ellen Gulbranson, Thila Plaichinger, Anna Bahr-Mildenburg, Katharine Fleischer-Edel, Felice Kaschowska, Lucie Weidt
- Gadski and Destinn: Johanna Gadski, Emmy Destinn
- Contraltos: Marianne Brandt, Ernestine Schumann-Heink, Rosa Olitzka, Edyth Walker, Margarete Matzenauer
- Heldentenors: Hermann Winkelmann, Erik Schmedes, Ernest van Dyck, Andreas Dippel, Heinrich Knote, Karel Burian, Alfred von Bary, Wilhelm Herold, Jacques Urlus, Leo Slezak, Karl Jörn,
- Lieder singers: Gustav Walter, Felix Senius
- Baritones and basses: Karl Scheidemantel, Baptist Hoffmann, Anton van Rooy, Theodor Bertram, Leon Rains, Leopold Demuth, Wilhelm Hesch

=== Singers of Imperial Russia ===
- Sopranos and contraltos: Natalia Yuzhina, Antonina Nezhdanova, Marie Michailova, Alma Fohrström, Nina Friede, Eugenia Zbujeva, Anastasia Vialtzeva
- Tenors, baritones and basses: Nikolay Figner, Ivan Erschov, Leonid Sobinov, Andrei Labinsky, Alexander Davidov, Ivan Altchevsky, Tadeusz Leliva, Joachim Tartakov, Nicholai Shevelev, Waclav Brzezinski, Lev Sibiriakov, Vladimir Kastorsky, Feodor Chaliapin

=== Supplement ===
- Félia Litvinne, Georgette Bréjean-Silver, Léon Lafitte, Méyriane Héglon, Gemma Bellincioni, Elisa Bruno, Alice Cucini, Mario Gilion, Francesco Maria Bonini, Giuseppe De Luca, Enrico Nani, Vittorio Arimondi, Oreste Luppi, Nazzareno De Angelis, Elise Elizza, Marie Dietrich, Minnie Nast, Marie Götze, Wilhelm Grüning, John Forsell

== The Record of Singing Volume 2 (1914–1925) ==
=== Revolution and Russian Songs ===
- Chaliapin: Feodor Chaliapin (1873–1938), George Baklanov (1880–1938), Alexander Bragin (1881–1955), Ivan Grizounov (1897–1919), Ivan Ivantzov (c.1880–?)
- Smirnov: Dimitri Smirnov (1881–1944)
- Kouznetsova to Koshetz: Maria Nikolaevna Kouznetsova (1880–1966), Marianne Tcherkasskaya (1884–1919), Nina Koshetz (1891–1965)
- Two 'Coloraturas': Lydia Lipkowska (1882–1958), Eugenia Bronskaya (1882–1953)
- Contraltos: Elisaveta Petrenko (1880–1951), Vera Petrova-Zvanceva (1875–1944), Klavdia Tugarinova (1877–?)

=== The French Tradition in Decline ===
- Franz, Ansseau and Fontaine: Paul Franz (1876–1950), Fernand Ansseau (1890–1972), Charles Fontaine (1878–1955)
- A Quintet of Lyric Tenors: David Devriès (1881–1936), Fernand Francell (1880–1966), Charles Friant (1890–1947), Louis Cazette (1887–1922), René Lapelletrie (1884–1956)
- Baritones of the Opéra: Dinh Gilly (1877–1940), Louis Lestelly (1877–1936)
- Journet and the Basses: Marcel Journet (1867–1933), Hector Dufranne (1870–1951), Paul Payan (1878–1959)
- Singing Actors: Vanni Marcoux (1877–1962), Jean Aquistapace (1888–1952), Alfred Maguenat (c. 1880–?), Armand Crabbé (1883–1947)
- Contraltos: Suzanne Brohly (1882–1943), Marie Charbonnel (1880–1969), Jacqueline Royer (1884–?)
- Five International Sopranos: Marie-Louise Edvina (1880–1948), Marthe Chenal (1881–1947), Geneviève Vix (1879–1939), Yvonne Gall (1885–1972), Fanny Heldy (1888–1973)
- Lyric Sopranos at the Opéra-Comique: Marguerite Mérentié (1880–?), Aline Vallandri (1878–1952), Zina Brozia (1876–1958)
- A Trio of Concert Singers: Gabrielle Ritter-Ciampi (1886–1974), Berthe Auguez de Montalant (1865–1937), Georgette Leblanc-Maeterlinck (1860–1941)

=== The Heyday of Verismo ===
- The Duse of Song: Claudia Muzio (1889–1936)
- Raisa and some Dramatic Sopranos: Rosa Raisa (1892–1963), Elena Ruszkowska (1878–1948), Maria Labia (1880–1953), Adelina Agostinelli (1880–1954), Ester Mazzoleni (1883–1982)
- Verismo Sopranos: Tina Poli-Randaccio (1879–1956), Carmen Melis (1885–1967), Juanita Caracciolo (1890–1924), Gilda Dalla Rizza (1892–1975)

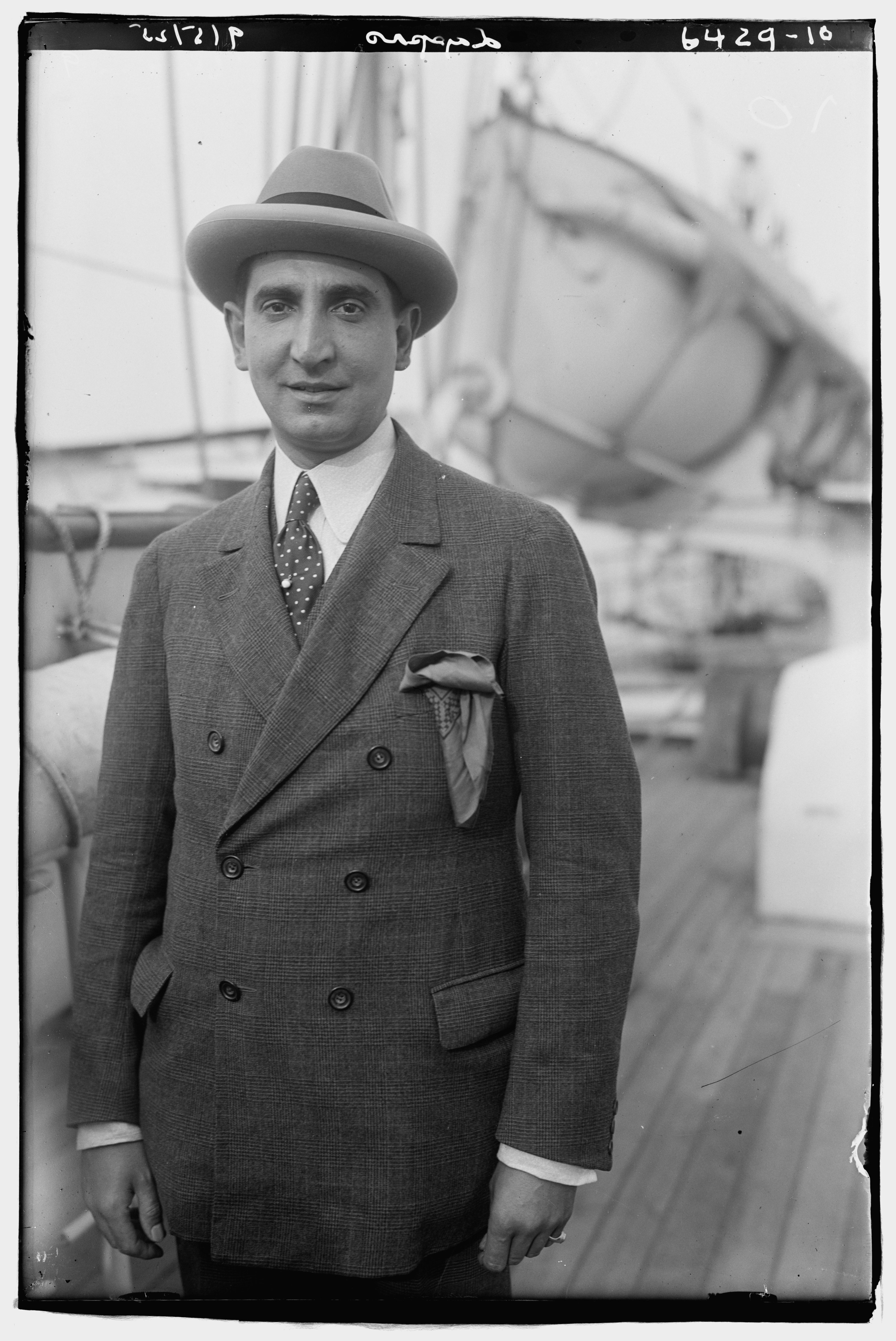
Ulysses Lappas

- Galli-Curci and the 'Coloraturas': Amelita Galli-Curci (1882–1963), Maria Barrientos (1884-1946), Graziella Pareto (1889–1975), Elvira de Hidalgo (1892–1980), Lucrezia Bori (1887–1960)
- Italian Contraltos: Gabriella Besanzoni (1888–1962), Fanny Anitùa (1887–1968), Luisa Bertana (1898–1933)
- Lyric Tenors: Tito Schipa (1889–1965), Fernando Carpi (1876–1959),
- Tradition and the Italian Tenor: Beniamino Gigli (1890–1957), Hipólito Lázaro (1887–1974), Miguel Fleta (1893–1938), Giulio Crimi (1885–1939), Ulysses Lappas (1881–1971)
- Four Dramatic Tenors: Bernardo de Muro (1881–1955), Edoardo Ferrari-Fontana (1878–1936), Icilio Calleja (1882–1941), Giovanni Martinelli (1885–1969)
- Principal Baritones: Giuseppe De Luca (1870–1950), Riccardo Stracciari (1875–1955), Domenico Viglione-Borchese (1877–1957), Renato Zanelli (1892–1935), Emilio Sagi-Barba (1875–1949)
- Mardones: José Mardones (1868–1932)

=== Singers from the English-Speaking World ===
- Alda and Mason: Frances Alda (1879–1952), Edith Mason (1892–1973)
- American Concert Sopranos: Alma Gluck (1884-I938), Hulda Lashanska (1893–1974), Anna Case (1889–1984), Éva Gauthier (1885–1958)
- American Lyric Sopranos: Anna Fitziu (1888–1967), Carolina White (1886–1961), Lucille Marcel (1887–1921), Julia Heinrich (1880–1919), Marguerite Namara (1888–1977)
- Gramophone Singers: Eleanor Jones-Hudson (1874–1946), Ruth Vincent (1877–1955), Lucy Isabelle Marsh (1878–1956), Olive Kline (1887–1976)
- A Quartet of 'Coloraturas': Evelyn Scotney (1886–1967), Mabel Garrison (1886–1963), Florence Macbeth (1891–1966), Luella Paikin (1900–?)
- English Lyric Sopranos: Maud Perceval Allen (1880–1955), Rosina Buckman (1880–1948)
- Miura and Bryhn-Langard: Tamaki Miura (1884–1946), Borghild Bryhn-Langard (1883–1939)
- Ponselle and Easton: Rosa Ponselle (1897–1981), Florence Easton (1882–1955)
- Contraltos: Carmen Hill (1883–?), Leila Megane (1891–1960), Carolina Lazzari (1891–1946), Edna Thornton (1875–1958), Sophie Braslau (1892–1935), Eleonora de Cisneros (1878–1934)
- A Quartet of American Tenors: Riccardo Martin (1874–1952), Orville Harrold (1878–1933), Charles Hackett (1887–1941), Mario Chamlee (1892–1966)
- A British Born Trio: Edward Johnson (1878–1959) (actually born in Canada), Alfred Piccaver (1883–1958), Joseph Hislop (1884–1977)
- High Cs and Heroic Voices: John O'Sullivan (1878–1948), Frank Mullings (1881–1953)
- The Ballad and Oratorio Tradition: John Coates (1865–1941), Gervase Elwes (1866–1921), Walter Hyde (1875–1951), Paul Reimers (1877–1942)
- McCormack: John McCormack (1884–1945)
- Baritones and Basses: Reinald Werrenrath (1883–1953), Peter Dawson (1882–1961), Horace Stevens (1876–1954), Malcolm McEachern (1883–1945)

=== The German Style in Evolution ===
- Lyric Sopranos: Eva von der Osten (1881–1936), Luise Perard-Petzl (1884–1936), Zinaida Jurjevskaya (1896–1925), Elisabeth Rethberg (1894–1976), Grete Stückgold (1895–1977)
- Lyric-Dramatic Sopranos: Elsa Bland (1880–1935), Lily Hafgren-Dinkela (1884–1965), Barbara Kemp (1881–1959), Charlotte von Seebök (1886–1952)
- Dramatic Sopranos: Melanie Kurt (1880–1941), Berta Morena (1878–1952), Helene Wildbrunn (1882–1972), Gertrude Bindernagel (1894–1932), Gertrude Kappel (1884–1971), Frida Leider (1888–1975)
- Schumann: Elisabeth Schumann (1888–1952), Berta Kiurina (1881–1933), Lola Artôt de Padilla (1880–1933), Claire Dux (1885–1967), Vera Schwarz (1884–1964), Maria Ivogün (1891–1987)
- Jeritza and Lehmann: Maria Jeritza (1887–1982), Lotte Lehmann (1888–1976)
- Five Contraltos: Margarethe Arndt-Ober (1885–1971), Ottilie Metzger (1878–1943), Ankar Horvat (1888– c.1921), Sabine Kalter (1889–1957), Emmi Leisner (1885–1958)
- The Great Lieder Singers: Elena Gerhardt (1883–1961), Julia Culp (1880–1970)
- Baritones: Julius von Raatz-Brockmann (1870–1944), Friedrich Broderson (1873–1926), Heinrich Rehkemper (1894–1949), Hans Duhan (1890–1971), Hermann Weil (1876–1949), Cornelis Bronsgeest (1878–1957), Joseph Groenen (1885–1959), Joseph Schwarz (1880–1926)
- Basses: Michael Bohnen (1887–1965), Paul Bender (1875–1947), Richard Mayr (1877–1935), Walter Soomier (1878–1955), Carl Braun (1886–1960), Alexander Kipnis (1891–1978)
- Tauber and the Lyric Tenors: Richard Tauber (1891–1948), Alexander Kirchner (1876–1948), Johannes Sembach (1881–1944), Herman Jadlowker (1877–1953)
- East European Tenors: Ottokar Marak (1872–1939), Ignacy Dygas (1881–1955), Joseph Mann (1883–1921), Tino Pattiera (1890–1966)
- Heldentenors: Richard Schubert (1885–1969), Walter Kirchhoff (1879–1951), Lauritz Melchior (1890–1973)

== The Record of Singing Volume 3 (1926–1939) ==
=== The German School ===
- Lauritz Melchior, Max Lorenz, Franz Völker, Helge Rosvaenge, Torsten Ralf, Richard Tauber, Marcel Wittrisch, Herbert Ernst Groh, Joseph Schmidt, Julius Patzak, Karl Erb, Leo Slezak, Gerhard Hüsch, Heinrich Schlusnus, Herbert Janssen, Willi Domgraf-Fassbaender, Karl Hammes, Rudolf Bocklemann, Friedrich Schorr, Hans-Hermann Nissen, Alfred Jerger, Leo Schützendorf, Wilhelm Strienz, Ivar F. Andresen, Alexander Kipnis
- Sigrid Onégin, Karin Branzell, Kerstin Thorborg, Maria Olczewska, Margarete Klose, Rosette Anday, Marta Fuchs, Elena Gerhardt, Lula Mysz-Gmeiner, Jo Vincent, Ria Ginster, Ursula van Diemen, Elisabeth Schumann, Lotte Schöne, Fritzi Jokl, Adele Kern, Miliza Korjus, Erna Berger, Emmy Bettendorf, Felicie Hüni-Mihacsek, Margherita Perras, Luise Helletsgruber, Meta Seinemeyer, Margarete Teschemacher, Delia Reinhardt, Tiana Lemnitz, Maria Cebotari, Elisabeth Rethberg, Rose Pauly, Göta Ljungberg, Lotte Lehmann, Maria Müller, Maria Nemeth, Elisabeth Ohms, Nanny Larsén-Todsen, Frida Leider, Kirsten Flagstad

=== The Italian School ===
- Conchita Supervía, Gianna Pederzini, Irene Minghini-Cattaneo, Ebe Stignani, Florica Christoforeanu, Pia Tassinari, Giannina Arangi-Lombardi, Bianca Scacciati, Dusolina Giannini, Maria Caniglia, Lina Bruna Rasa, Gina Cigna, Iva Pacetti, Margaret Burke Sheridan, Rosetta Pampanini, Claudia Muzio, Hina Spani, Maria Farneti, Maria Zamboni, Mafalda Favero, Licia Albanese, Magda Olivero, Bidu Sayão, Conchita Badía, Adelaide Saraceni, Mercedes Capsir, Toti Dal Monte, Lina Pagliughi
- Ezio Pinza, Tancredi Pasero, Nazzareno De Angelis, Salvatore Baccaloni, Afro Poli, Mariano Stabile, Mario Basiola, Apollo Granforte, Cesare Formichi, Carlo Galeffi, Benvenuto Franci, Giovanni Inghilleri, Carlo Tagliabue, Riccardo Stracciari, Dino Borgioli, Enzo de Muro Lomanto, Tito Schipa, Tino Folgar, Luigi Fort, Alessandro Ziliani, Galliano Masini, Francesco Merli, Renato Zanelli, Beniamino Gigli, Jussi Björling, Antonio Cortis, Giacomo Lauri-Volpi, Aureliano Pertile

=== The French School ===
- Lily Pons, Leila Ben Sedira, Emma Luart, Germaine Féraldy, Eidé Norena, Ninon Vallin, Povla Frijsh, Jane Bathori, Madeleine Grey, Germaine Martinelli, Suzanne Cesbron-Viseur, Suzanne Balguerie, Germaine Lubin, Germaine Cernay, Claire Croiza, Alice Raveau
- Georges Thill, René Maison, José Luccioni, César Vezzani, René Verdière, Gaston Micheletti, Miguel Villabella, André d'Arkor, Giuseppe Lugo, Joseph Rogatchewsky, Jean Planel, Charles Panzéra, Pierre Bernac, Martial Singher, Roger Bourdin, Arthur Endrèze, Robert Couzinou, André Balbon, Lucien Fugère, Vanni Marcoux, Yvonne Printemps, Reynaldo Hahn

=== The Anglo-American School ===
- Lawrence Tibbett, John Charles Thomas, Dennis Noble, John Brownlee, Harold Williams, Peter Dawson, John McCormack, Roland Hayes, Charles Kullman, Heddle Nash, Thomas Burke, Richard Crooks, Walter Widdop, Norman Allin
- Marguerite d'Alvarez, Madame Charles Cahier, Muriel Brunskill, Clara Butt, Marian Anderson, Susan Metcalfe Casals, Grace Moore, Gladys Swarthout, Ina Souez, Maggie Teyte, Isobel Baillie, Dora Labbette, Joan Cross, Florence Easton, Rosa Ponselle, Marjorie Lawrence, Eva Turner, Florence Austral

=== The East European/Slavic School ===
- Jarmila Novotná, Nathalie Vechor, Ada Nordenova, Maria Kurenko, Xenia Belmas, Ada Sari, Oda Slobodskaya, Maria Krasová, Maria Basilides, Mark Reizen, Feodor Chaliapin, Imre Palló, Vladimir Rosing, Sergei Lemeshev

== The Record of Singing Volume 4 (1939 to the end of the 78 era, circa 1955) ==
=== The Anglo-American School ===
- Margaret Ritchie, Gwen Catley, Dorothy Kirsten, Florence Quartararo, Elsie Houston, Eleanor Steber, Maggie Teyte, Dorothy Maynor, Joan Hammond, Astrid Varnay, Helen Traubel, Rose Bampton, Blanche Thebom, Jennie Tourel, Flora Nielsen, Gladys Ripley, Kathleen Ferrier, David Lloyd, Webster Booth, Peter Pears, Jan Peerce, Walter Midgley, James Johnston, Richard Tucker, Alfred Deller, Robert Irwin, Frederick Fuller, Igor Gorin, Mack Harrell, Leonard Warren, Robert Merrill, Norman Walker, George London, Oscar Natzka

=== The French School ===
- Mado Robin, Martha Angelici, Irène Joachim, Géori Boué, Ginette Guillamat, Renée Doria, Victoria de los Ángeles, Suzanne Danco, Suzanne Juyol, Irma Kolassi, Solange Michel, Hélène Bouvier, Rita Gorr, Hugues Cuénod, Raoul Jobin, Pierre Bernac, Camille Maurane, Gérard Souzay

=== The German School ===
- Elisabeth Schumann, Erika Köth, Maria Stader, Elisabeth Schwarzkopf, Irmgard Seefried, Maria Reining, Elisabeth Grümmer, Sena Jurinac, Ljuba Welitsch, Gré Brouwenstijn, Leonie Rysanek, Inge Borkh, Friedel Beckmann, Hilde Konetzni, Elisabeth Höngen, Hugo Meyer Welfing, Anton Dermota, Walther Ludwig, Julius Patzak, Peter Anders, Rudolf Schock, Dietrich Fischer-Dieskau, Karl Schmitt-Walter, Erich Kunz, Marko Rothmuller, Paul Schöffler, Hans Hotter, Ludwig Weber, Josef Herrmann, Theo Herrmann, Gottlob Frick

=== The Scandinavian School ===
- Kirsten Flagstad, Lorri Lail, Gjurgja Leppée, Aksel Schiøtz, Stefán Íslandi, Nicolai Gedda, Jussi Björling, Hugo Hasslo, Bernhard Sönnerstedt, Joel Berglund, Kim Borg

=== The Russian and Slavonic Schools ===
- Mascia Predit, Zara Dolukhanova, Claudia Novikova, Nadezhda Obukhova, Georgi Vinogradov, Ivan Zhadan, Georgi Nelepp, Beno Blachut, Ivan Kozlovsky, Pavel Lisitsian, Andrei Ivanov, Boris Christoff, Mark Reizen, Boris Gmyrya, Endre Koréh

=== The Italian School ===
- Ferruccio Tagliavini, Beniamino Gigli, Giuseppe Di Stefano, Luigi Infantino, Giovanni Malipiero, Giacinto Prandelli, Mario Del Monaco, Paolo Silveri, Tito Gobbi, Giuseppe Valdengo, Giampiero Malaspina, Gino Bechi, Raffaele Arié, Nicola Rossi-Lemeni, Tancredi Pasero, Cloe Elmo, Giulietta Simionato, Fedora Barbieri, Ebe Stignani, Alda Noni, Elena Arizmendi, Margherita Carosio, Magda László, Alba Anzellotti, Gabriella Gatti, Renata Tebaldi, Sara Scuderi, Margherita Grandi, Zinka Milanov, Maria Callas

== The Record of Singing Volume 5 (From the LP to the digital era 1953–2007) ==
=== Wagner singers of the 1950s and early 1960s ===
- Kirsten Flagstad, Birgit Nilsson, Elisabeth Grümmer, Régine Crespin, Rita Gorr, Gottlob Frick, Ludwig Weber, Dietrich Fischer-Dieskau, Fritz Wunderlich, Astrid Varnay, Ludwig Suthaus, Martha Mödl, Hans Hotter, Otto Edelmann, Rudolf Schock, Ferdinand Frantz, Josef Greindl

=== Sopranos and mezzo-sopranos: 1953–1968 ===
- Joan Hammond, Joan Sutherland, Maria Callas, Rita Streich, Erika Köth, Renate Holm, Elsie Morison, Antonietta Stella, Martha Angelici, Janine Micheau, Graziella Sciutti, Aase Nordmo Løvberg, Anna Moffo, June Bronhill, Hilde Gueden, Victoria de los Ángeles, Melitta Muszely, Amy Shuard, Lisa Della Casa, Hanny Steffek, Pilar Lorengar, Andrée Esposito, Sari Barabas, Lucia Popp, Renata Scotto, Elisabeth Schwarzkopf, Mirella Freni, Anneliese Rothenberger, Reri Grist, Gwyneth Jones, Christa Ludwig

=== Tenors: 1953–1968 ===
- Jussi Björling, Henri Legay, Léopold Simoneau, Albert Lance, Eugenio Fernandi, João Gibin, Richard Lewis, Charles Craig, Giuseppe Campora, Fritz Wunderlich, Ronald Dowd, Alfredo Kraus, Luigi Alva, Wilfred Brown, Jess Thomas, Franco Corelli, Peter Schreier, Nicolai Gedda, James King, Luciano Pavarotti

=== Baritones and basses: 1955–1967 ===
- Tito Gobbi, Boris Christoff, Rolando Panerai, Nicola Zaccaria, Michel Dens, Eberhard Wächter, Ernest Blanc, Hermann Prey, Nicolai Ghiaurov, Cornell MacNeil

=== Sopranos: 1969–1988 ===
- Martina Arroyo, Mady Mesplé, Elly Ameling, Montserrat Caballé, Helga Dernesch, Gundula Janowitz, Edda Moser, Margaret Price, Beverly Sills, Galina Vishnevskaya, Heather Harper, Leontyne Price, Ileana Cotrubaș, Elisabeth Söderström, Kiri Te Kanawa, Ghena Dimitrova, Jessye Norman, Edita Gruberová, Hildegard Behrens, Luciana Serra

=== Mezzo-sopranos: 1969–1984 ===
- Grace Bumbry, Shirley Verrett, Yvonne Minton, Frederica von Stade, Fiorenza Cossotto, Irina Arkhipova, Elena Obraztsova, Teresa Berganza, Tatiana Troyanos, Agnes Baltsa, Janet Baker, Marilyn Horne, Ann Murray

=== Tenors: 1969–1988 ===
- Carlo Bergonzi, Jon Vickers, René Kollo, Ian Partridge, Donald Smith, Franco Bonisolli, José Carreras, Alain Vanzo, Neil Shicoff

=== Baritones and basses: 1966–1986 ===
- John Shirley-Quirk, Piero Cappuccilli, Geraint Evans, Gabriel Bacquier, Gérard Souzay, Kurt Moll, Walter Berry, Peter Glossop, Ruggero Raimondi, Sherrill Milnes, Martti Talvela, Aage Haugland, José van Dam, Thomas Allen

=== Sopranos: 1989–2004 ===
- June Anderson, Barbara Hendricks, Cheryl Studer, Katia Ricciarelli, Dagmar Schellenberger, Karita Mattila, Solveig Kringelborn, Ruth Ann Swenson, Felicity Lott, Christine Brewer, Jane Eaglen

=== Mezzo-sopranos: 1988–2001 ===
- Brigitte Fassbaender, Anne Sofie von Otter, Waltraud Meier, Hera Lind, Michelle DeYoung, Bernarda Fink, Katarina Karnéus, Lorraine Hunt-Lieberson

=== Tenors: 1989–2001 ===
- John Aler, Plácido Domingo, Chris Merritt, Ben Heppner, Michael Schade, Roberto Alagna, José Cura

=== Baritones and basses: 1991–1995 ===
- Bryn Terfel, Bernd Weikl, François le Roux, Thomas Hampson, Simon Keenlyside, Thomas Quasthoff

=== Singers of Baroque and early music and early music 1953–2005 ===
- Female: Montserrat Figueras, Helen Donath, Arleen Auger, Emily Van Evera, Nancy Argenta, Emma Kirkby, Catherine King, Patricia Petibon, Susan Graham, Véronique Gens
- Male: Alfred Deller, James Bowman, Nigel Rogers, Paul Esswood, Aris Christofellis, Charles Brett, René Jacobs, Michael Chance, Harry van der Kamp, Dominique Visse, Derek Lee Ragin, Gérard Lesne, Philippe Jaroussky, Bejun Mehta

=== Singers of the new millennium: 2000–2007 ===
- Sopranos, mezzo-sopranos and contraltos: Angela Gheorghiu, Sandrine Piau, Natalie Dessay, Violeta Urmana, Patrizia Ciofi, Joyce DiDonato, Sine Bundgaard, Deborah Voigt, Christine Rice, Nina Stemme, Diana Damrau, Hyunah Yu, Kate Royal, Stephanie Blythe, Vivica Genaux
- Tenors and countertenors: Daniil Shtoda, Jonas Kaufmann, Ian Bostridge, Yu Qiang Dai, David Daniels, Lawrence Brownlee, Rolando Villazón, Max Emanuel Cenčić, Toby Spence, Franco Fagioli
- Baritones and basses: Laurent Naouri, Giovanni Furlanetto, Luca Pisaroni, Erwin Schrott, Jonathan Lemalu, Rodion Pogossov, Ildebrando D'Arcangelo

== Bibliography ==
- Albright, William (1990) 'The Record of Singing: A Brief Overview of a Monumental Project' in The Opera Quarterly 1990 7(1):31–42, Oxford University Press

== Discography ==
- The EMI Record of Singing, Volume 3 (1926–1939) (Testament Records) alt
- The Record of Singing – The Very Best of Volumes 1–4 (From 1899 to the end of the 78 era: 1899–1952 (EMI Records) alt
