= Torsten Ralf =

Swedish opera singer

Torsten Ralf (2 January 1901 – 27 April 1954) was a Swedish operatic tenor, particularly associated with Wagner and Strauss roles, one of the leading dramatic tenors/heldentenors of the inter-war period.

Ralf was born in Malmö. He began his vocal studies in Stockholm with Haldis Ingebjart and John Forsell, and later studied in Berlin with Hertha Dehmlow. He made his debut in 1930, as Cavaradossi in Stettin. After singing in Chemnitz (1931–33) and Frankfurt (1933–35), he joined the Staatsoper Dresden in 1935. He also appeared regularly at the Munich State Opera and the Vienna State Opera, establishing himself in roles such as Florestan, Tannhäuser, Lohengrin, Stolzing, Siegmund, Tristan, Parsifal, Bacchus, but also Radames, Otello.

He created Apollo in Strauss's Daphne in 1938, and was part of the premiere of Heinrich Sutermeister's Die Zauberinsel in 1942.

Ralf made guest appearances at the Royal Opera House in London, the Teatro Colón in Buenos Aires. During the war, Ralf sang with the Berlin State Opera and the Royal Swedish Opera. He made his debut at the New York Metropolitan Opera in 1945, as Lohengrin under the baton of Fritz Busch; he sang at the Met for three seasons.

In 1952 he received the title of Hovsångare (Court Singer). Ralf died unexpectedly in Stockholm in 1954, but several recordings survive, notably his excerpts of Lohengrin with Tiana Lemnitz as Elsa, as Tristan with Helen Traubel as Isolde, as well as scenes from Die Frau ohne Schatten with Hilde Konetzni.

His brothers were the tenor and translator Oscar Ralf (1881–1964) and the tenor and composer Einar Ralf (1888–1971). The German tenor Peter Schreier named his two sons Torsten and Ralf after him.

== Selected recording ==
- Verdi – Otello, with Hilde Konetzni, Paul Schöffler – Vienna State Opera Chorus and Orchestra, Karl Böhm – Cantus Classic (complete recording sung in German, 1944)
- Wagner – Die Meistersinger, act 3, with Margarete Teschemacher, Hans-Hermann Nissen, others, Dresden Staatsoper Chorus and Staatskapelle Dresden [(Karl Böhm)] in German (1938) on Hänssler Profil
- Wagner – Die Walküre, with Helene Werth, and Gertrude Grob-Prandl, with Robert F. Denzler conducting the Orchestre de la Suisse Romande
