= Konetzni =

Konetzni is a surname. Notable people with the surname include:

- Anny Konetzni, Austrian soprano
- Hilde Konetzni, Austrian soprano, sister of Anny Konetzni
