= Erik Schmedes =

Danish tenor (1868–1931)

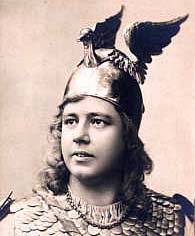
Erik Schmedes as Lohengrin, 1902.

Erik Anton Julius Schmedes (27 August 1868, in Gentofte, Denmark – 21 March 1931, in Vienna) was an operatic tenor, particularly known for his roles in operas by Richard Wagner. He was a brother-in-law by marriage of Vaslav Nijinsky.

== Career ==
Schmedes was born into a family of musicians, the most prominent of which was his brother Hakon, a noted violinist and composer. After studying in Paris, Berlin, and Vienna, he made his debut as a baritone (following encouragement from Pauline Viardot) in Wiesbaden, in 1891, as the Herald in Lohengrin. He continued to sing as a baritone until 1897. However, after further study with August Iffert in Vienna, his Heldentenor emerged. He made his debut as a tenor in 1898, singing the title role in Siegfried at the Vienna State Opera. His career remained largely based at that opera house, where he was a Kammersänger and one of the most prominent tenors during the years of Gustav Mahler's direction of the company.

Schmedes sang frequently at Bayreuth from 1899 through 1906. He also appeared at the Metropolitan Opera in the 1908–09 season, singing in Die Walküre (with Johanna Gadski, Olive Fremstad, and Louise Homer), Tiefland (the United States premiere, opposite Emmy Destinn), Parsifal, Götterdämmerung (conducted by Arturo Toscanini), and Tristan und Isolde (conducted by Mahler).

Although he primarily sang roles from the Wagnerian repertoire, Schmedes was also an admired interpreter of Florestan in Beethoven's Fidelio and the title role of Hans Pfitzner's Palestrina. During his career, he sang 1,130 performances of forty-two roles and recorded for several companies, including Gramophone and Pathé, from 1900 to 1911.

== Legacy ==
The Heldentenor recorded excerpts from Der Evangelimann, Die Walküre, Lohengrin, Das Rheingold, Siegfried, Pagliacci, Die Meistersinger, Rienzi, Dalibor, Cavalleria rusticana, Tristan und Isolde, Parsifal, Otello, Carmen, Il trovatore, Lucia di Lammermoor, Faust, Tannhäuser, Norma, Die Rose vom Liebesgarten, Pique-dame, Der Templer und die Jüdin, Rigoletto, Guillaume Tell, Le prophète, Manon, Le muette de Portici, Die Königin von Saba, Samson et Dalila, Götterdämmerung, Iphigénie en Tauride, Werther, and, in Italian, Tosca. He is heard in Volume I of EMI's The Record of Singing, in an excerpt from Tiefland.

Often regarded as a greater actor than singer, Schmedes appeared in two films, the more notable of which was Paul Czinner's 1919 silent Inferno, which is considered a lost film.

Schmedes' last performance was in 1924 in the title role of Wilhelm Kienzl's Der Evangelimann. When he retired from the stage, he became a voice teacher in Vienna. Among his pupils were Maria Müller and Anny Konetzni.

Erik Schmedes is a character in the 2012 novel, Death and the Maiden: A Max Liebermann Mystery, by Frank Tallis.

== Notes and references ==
- Cervenka, G., 2006, 'Ein legendärer Helden-Tenor', Österreichischer Rundfunk. Accessed 30 April 2007.
- Hefling, S., 2003, Liner Notes for Mahler's Decade in Vienna: Singers of the Court Opera 1897–1907, Marston Records 53004-2. Accessed 30 April 2007.
- Erik Schmedes at IMDb. Accessed 30 April 2007.
- Metropolitan Opera Archives (accessed 30 April 2007)
- Rosenthal, H. and Warrack, J.,1979, The Concise Oxford Dictionary of Opera, 2nd Edition, Oxford University Press. p. 446.
- Schmedes family grave in the Gentofte Kirke cemetery. Accessed 30 April 2007.
- Thompson, H. (September 1902). "Wagner at Bayreuth and at Munich". The Musical Times.
