= Peter Anders =

Peter Anders may refer to:

- Peter Anders (tenor) (1908–1954), German tenor and favorite under the Hitler regime
- Peter Anders (songwriter), (Peter Andreoli, 1941–2016) American songwriter and record producer, who collaborated with Vini Poncia among others
