= Melanie Kurt =

Austrian opera singer

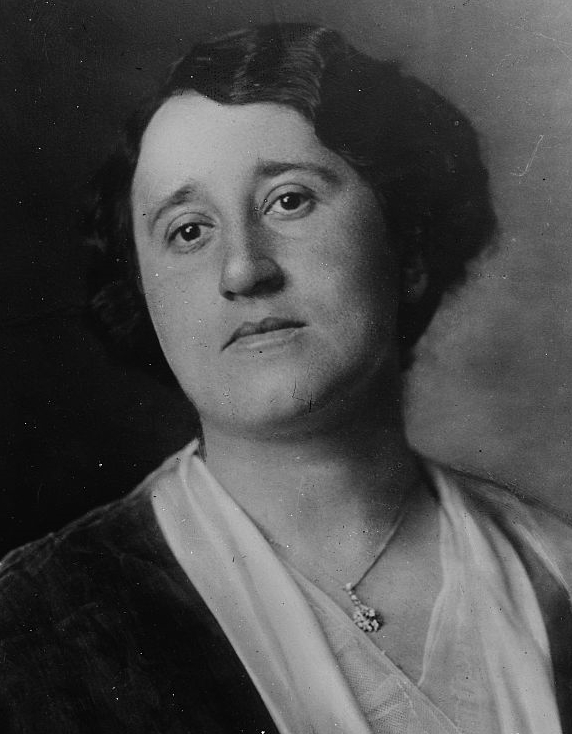
- Kurt, George Grantham Bain collection (Library of Congress)
- Born: 6 August 1886; Diemarden
- Died: 12 March 1965 (aged 78); New York City, N.Y., U.S.
- Occupations: Dramatic soprano; Music pedagogue
- Organizations: Metropolitan Opera

Melanie Kurt (8 January 1879 – 11 March 1941) was an Austrian dramatic soprano.

== Life and career ==
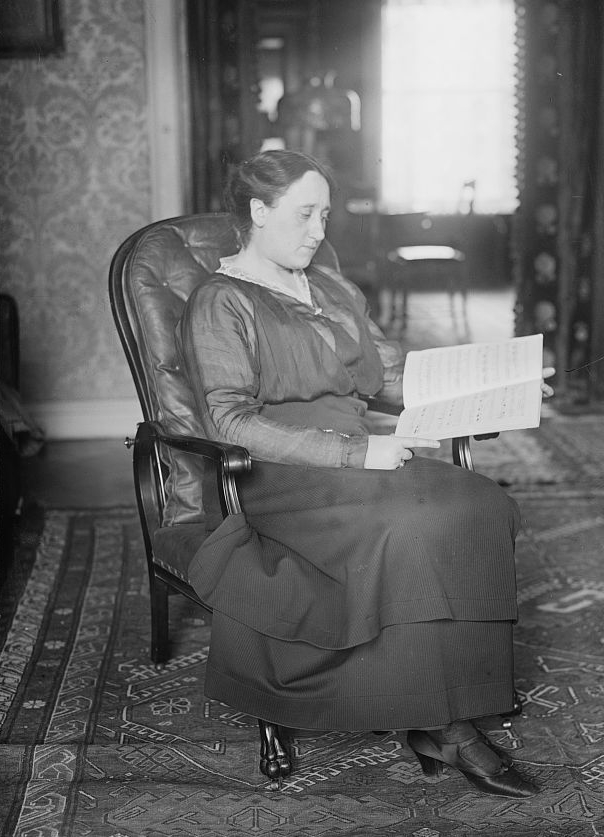
Another photograph from the Bain Collection, c. 1915

Melanie Kurt (originally Kohn; she legally changed her name to Kurt in 1902) was born in Vienna. She first studied to become a pianist before starting to take singing lessons. Her teacher was the famous Polish pianist Theodor Leschetizky, who had been a pupil of Carl Czerny's. She was successful at the piano, winning the coveted Liszt Prize. Later she went to Berlin, where Marie Lehmann, sister of the great soprano Lilli Lehmann, became her teacher. From 1897 to 1900 she only appeared as a pianist, before she gave her début at the civic theatre in Lübeck as Elisabeth in Wagner's Tannhäuser in 1902.

From 1903 to 1904 she was engaged at Oper Leipzig. After further studies in Berlin she worked in Braunschweig from 1905 to 1908 before returning to Berlin where she sang at the Berlin Hofoper (today's Staatsoper Unter den Linden), then (from 1912 to 1915) at the Städtische Oper in Charlottenburg (today's Deutsche Oper Berlin).

From her Berlin base, Kurt started her international career, giving successful guest performances at the Royal Opera House in London (since 1910), and during the Salzburg Mozart-Fest in 1910 (which would become the Salzburg Festival later). Later she added La Scala in Milan, the Vienna State Opera, the Dresden Hofoper (the Semperoper) and the Münchner Hofoper (today's Bavarian State Opera) to the list.

Her career reached its peak when she joined the Metropolitan Opera (Met) in New York City in 1915 where she succeeded Olive Fremstad as the company's leading Wagner soprano for three seasons. She appeared in 85 Met productions in that time. Her contract ended when the USA joined World War I in 1917 and Wagner operas were banned as being to German. Though the situation was difficult for Kurt she didn't return to Europe at once but stayed in the US until 1919 before returning to Germany.

In the following years she sang mainly in Berlin again, in Leipzig, Stuttgart, Dresden, Vienna and at the famous Wagner Festival in Zoppot (1922), then a serious rival to the Bayreuth Festival.

Around 1930 the singer retreated gradually from stage and started working as a teacher in Berlin. After 1933 Kurt had to emigrate to Vienna. In 1938, when the Nazis took over Austria Kurt left the continent for good and returned to the US, arriving in New York in November 1939. Until her death in 1941 she lived and taught in New York City.

== Repertoire ==
Kurt was most famous as a Wagner singer; she appeared as Isolde in Tristan und Isolde 49 times during her three years with the Met. Her Verdi roles included the title role in Aida and Amelia in Un ballo in maschera. She portrayed the title role in Beethoven's Fidelio, Mozart's Pamina in Die Zauberflöte and Donna Anna in Don Giovanni, Rachel in Halévy's La Juive, several roles in operas by Ruggiero Leoncavallo, Richard Strauss including in Marschallin in Der Rosenkavalier, Christoph Willibald Gluck and George Frideric Handel.

She made many recordings – often with partners like Jacques Urlus or Friedrich Schorr – that are sought after by collectors today, especially those from the period between 1910 and 1915.

The famous German critic Jürgen Kesting in his book about the great singers of the 20th century closed his article about Kurt: "Eine wundervolle Stimme und eine zentrale Sängerin." ("A wonderful voice, a central singer", p. 246)

== Literature ==
- Kesting, Jürgen: Die großen Sänger des 20. Jahrhunderts. ECON Verlag GmbH, Düsseldorf 1993, ISBN 3-517-07987-1.
