= Heldentenor =

Tenor voice type

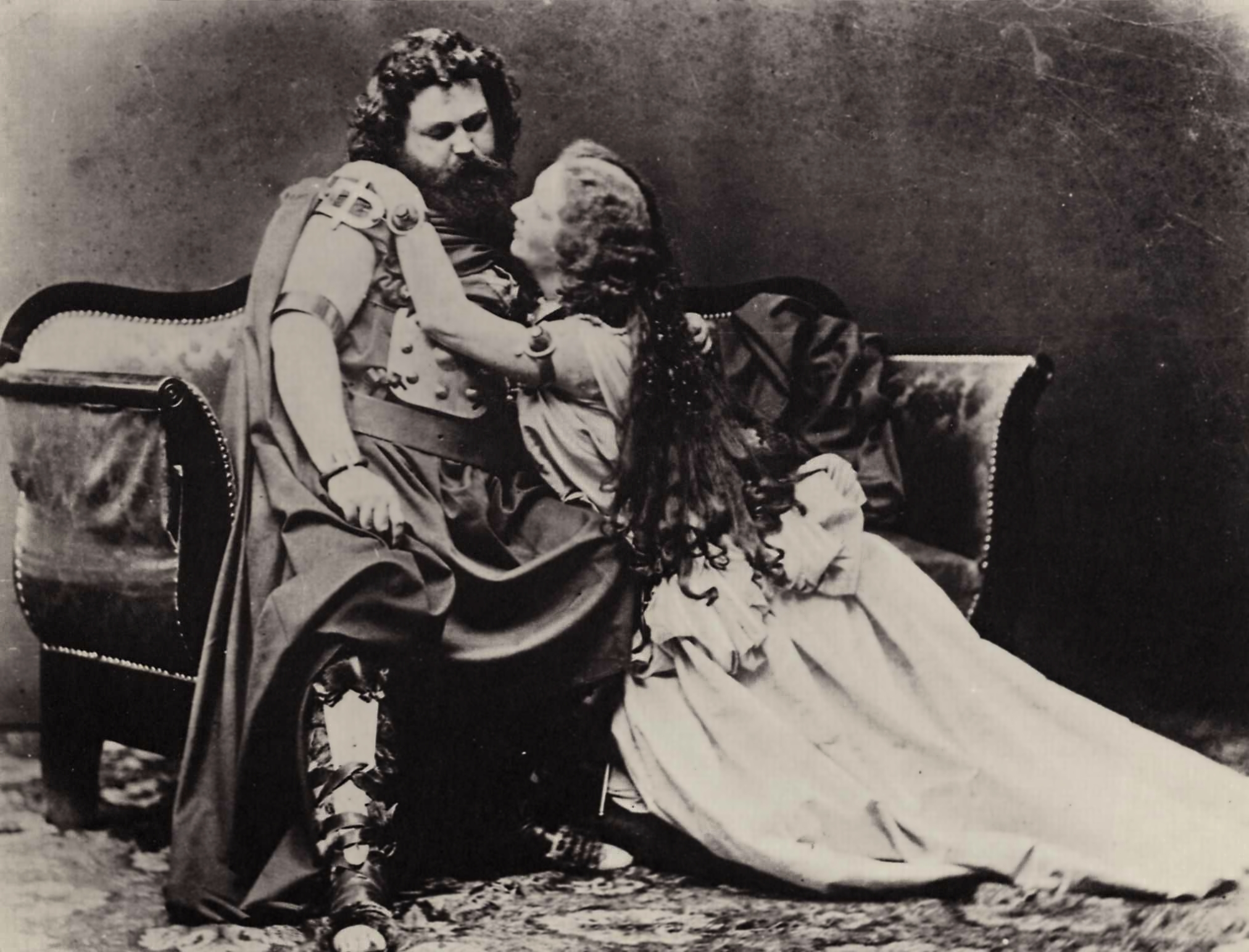
Heldentenor Ludwig Schnorr von Carolsfeld and his wife, Malvina, in the title roles of Tristan und Isolde, 1865.

A heldentenor (German: [ˈhɛl.dn̩.teˌnoːɐ̯]; English: heroic tenor), earlier called tenorbariton, is an operatic tenor voice, most often associated with Wagnerian repertoire.

It is distinct from other tenor fächer by its endurance, volume, and dark timbre, which may be, in its middle register, like that of a baritone. The voice may also sound clear or metallic. It is one of the rarest voice types in opera. Heldentenor roles, such as the title roles in Siegfried and Lohengrin, often require commanding stage presence and strong acting ability. In some cases, due to reasons such as voice misidentification, singers may begin their careers as baritones before later transitioning. The term heldentenor may be used to refer to both a singer and their voice.

The treble counterpart of the heldentenor is the Wagnerian soprano.

The heldentenor range from approximately (B_{2}) to (C_{5})

== Roles ==
The following roles are in the standard heldentenor repertoire:

=== Richard Wagner ===
- Lohengrin, Lohengrin
- Parsifal, Parsifal
- Rienzi, Rienzi
- Siegfried, Siegfried and Götterdämmerung
- Siegmund, Die Walküre
- Tannhäuser, Tannhäuser
- Tristan, Tristan und Isolde
- Walther von Stolzing, Die Meistersinger von Nürnberg

=== Richard Strauss ===
- Aegisth, Elektra
- Apollo, Daphne
- Bacchus, Ariadne auf Naxos
- Guntram, Guntram
- Herodes, Salome
- Der Kaiser (The Emperor), Die Frau ohne Schatten
- Menelaus, Die ägyptische Helena

=== Other ===
- Aeneas, Les Troyens (Berlioz)
- Florestan, Fidelio, (Beethoven)
- Otello, Otello (Verdi)
- Paul, Die tote Stadt (Korngold)
- Peter Grimes, Peter Grimes (Britten)
- Samson, Samson et Dalila (Saint-Saëns)
- Tambourmajor (Drum Major), Wozzeck (Berg)

== Example singers ==
"In fernem Land"
Lohengrin's grail aria, performed by Latvian tenor Hermann Jadlowker, 1912.

=== Germany ===
- Ludwig Schnorr von Carolsfeld
- Peter Hofmann
- Siegfried Jerusalem
- Heinrich Knote
- René Kollo
- Max Lorenz
- Albert Niemann
- Johannes Sembach
- Georg Unger
- Wolfgang Windgassen

=== Northern, Central, and Western Europe ===
- Karel Burian
- Lauritz Melchior
- Karl Aagaard Østvig
- Jean de Reszke
- Erik Schmedes
- Leo Slezak
- Set Svanholm
- Josef Tichatschek
- Jacques Urlus
- Christopher Ventris
- Walter Widdop

=== North and South America ===
- Richard Cassilly
- Stephen Gould
- Ben Heppner
- James King
- Gary Lakes
- Robert Dean Smith
- Jon Vickers
- Ramon Vinay
