= Anny Konetzni =

Austrian opera singer

- Born: Anny Konerczny; February 12, 1902; Ungarisch-Weisskirchen, Austria-Hungary (now Bela Crkva, Serbia)
- Died: September 6, 1968 (aged 66); Vienna, Austria
- Other names: Anni Konetzni; Anny Konetzni-Wiedmann
- Education: Vienna Conservatory
- Occupation: Operatic soprano
- Years active: 1925–1955
- Spouse: Albert Wiedmann
- Relatives: Hilde Konetzni (sister)

Anny Konetzni (sometimes given as Anni Konetzni), also known by her married name Anny Konetzni-Wiedmann, (born Anny Konerczny, 12 February 1902 – 6 September 1968) was an Austrian soprano. She began her career as a contralto at the Vienna Volksoper in 1925 but rapidly shifted into a career as a dramatic soprano at the Staatstheater Augsburg and the Opernhaus Wuppertal. She was a member of first the Berlin State Opera from 1931 to 1934, and then the Vienna State Opera from 1933 until her retirement in 1955.

Konetzni sang as a guest artist at numerous organizations internationally, including the Paris Opera, the Metropolitan Opera, La Scala, the Salzburg Festival, and the Royal Opera House, Covent Garden. In 1950 her performance of the title role of Richard Strauss's Elektra at the Maggio Musicale Fiorentino was recorded in what was the first complete recording of the opera. She taught on the voice faculty of the Vienna Music Academy from 1954 to 1957, but abandoned teaching due to ill health. Her sister was the opera singer Hilde Konetzni. She was married to the Viennese physician and academic Albert Wiedmann.

== Early life and education ==
Anny Konerczny was born on 12 February 1902 in Ungarisch-Weisskirchen, Austro-Hungarian Empire in what is today Bela Crkva, Serbia. She was the sister of soprano Hilde Konetzni. She studied singing at the Vienna Conservatory with Erik Schmedes from which she graduated. She later pursued further vocal studies with Jacques Stückgold in Berlin. She joined the chorus of the Vienna State Opera in 1923 but was fired as "stimmlos" (German for "without voice").

== Career ==
When Konetzni made her debut as principal singer in 1925 at the Vienna Volksoper (VV) it was as a contralto. Her first soprano role came not long after at the VV in 1926 when she appeared as Adriano in Wagner's Rienzi. Soon she became a dramatic soprano, and was active at the Staatstheater Augsburg and the Opernhaus Wuppertal in the last half of the 1920s into the early 1930s. In 1929 she starred in Richard Wagner's Ring Cycle at the Paris Opera. In Wuppertal she performed the title role in the world premiere of Hermann Grabner's Die Richterin on May 7, 1930.

Konetzni was a member of the Berlin State Opera from 1931 until 1934. There she sang Hélène in Berlin's first staging of Giuseppe Verdi's I vespri siciliani in 1932. In 1933 she was a guest artist at the Teatro Colón in Buenos Aires, and that same year she became a resident principal artist at the Vienna State Opera (VSO). She remained a member of the VSO until her retirement in 1955.

While the VSO was her home, Konetzni concurrently maintained an international career as a guest artist at various theaters; including performances at La Scala and the Teatro dell'Opera di Roma. In the summer of 1934 she appeared at the Salzburg Festival as Isolde in Tristan und Isolde and at the Munich Opera Festival as Brünnhilde in Siegfried. She subsequently returned to Salzburg for further engagements as Reiza in Oberon (1934), Leonore in Beethoven's Fidelio (1936), and The Marschallin in Der Rosenkavalier. She also appeared at the 1935 Salzburg Festival.

In December 1934 Konetzni made her debut at the Metropolitan Opera ("the Met") as Brünnhilde in Die Walküre under the baton of Artur Bodanzky. She subsequently appeared at the Met in Siegfried (1934) with Lauritz Melchior in the title role, and Venus in Tannhäuser (1935) with Lawrence Tibbett as Wolfram.

In 1935 Konetzni sang excerpts from Fidelio and lieder by Robert Schumann and Hugo Wolf with the Vienna Philharmonic and Hugo Wolf for international radio broadcast. That same year she sang Brünnhilde in the complete Ring Cycle at the Royal Opera House (ROH) in London; performing these operas with conductor Thomas Beecham. She returned to London every year until World War II. Other appearance at the ROH included Wagner's Isolde (1936, a touring production from the Semperoper), and a reprisals of the Ring Cycle in 1938 and 1939.

In 1937 Konetzni performed in radio broadcasts with the Leipzig Gewandhaus Orchestra, and in 1939 she performed Act III of Siegfried for radio broafcast with the London Philharmonic led by Beecham. When the Theater an der Wien re-opened as the new home of the VSO, she sang Leonore in Fidelio for the company's inaugural performance their on October 6, 1945 with Josef Krips conducting. In 1947 she appeared at the Dutch National Opera as The Marschallin, and in 1949 she portrayed Ortrud in Wagner's Lohengrin at the Arena di Verona Festival.

In 1950 Konetzni performed the title role in Strauss's Elektra at the Maggio Musicale Fiorentino; a performance which was recorded. It was the first complete recording of that opera. At the time of her retirement she was an honored guest at the reopening of the VSO (closed after damage during WWII) in November 1955. In assessing her career, Peter Branscombe stated, "Her voice, in its prime a strong, pure dramatic soprano, was not supported by a particularly impressive stage presence."

== Later life ==
From 1954 to 1957 Konetzni was a lecturer at the Vienna Music Academy. Ill health forced her to stop teaching. She was married to the Viennese dermatologist and syphilologist Albert Wiedmann (1901–1970).

Anny Konetzni died in Vienna on 6 September 1968.

== Awards ==
- 1935: Appointment as Austrian chamber singer
- 1955: Honorary membership of the Vienna State Opera
