= Ella Gmeiner =

German opera singer

Ella Gmeiner, married Ella Gmeiner-Klein (12 November 1874 in Brașov (Kronstadt), Transylvania - 24 December 1954 in Stuttgart) was a German opera singer (mezzo soprano).

== Life ==
Her sister was the famous Lied singer Lula Mysz-Gmeiner, her brother the bass baritone Rudolf Gmeiner. She was a student of Etelka Gerster. She made her debut in 1904 at the Konzerthaus Berlin. This was followed by engagements at the Weimarer Hoftheater and the Münchner Hofoper and guest performances in Wiesbaden, Stuttgart, Köln, Amsterdam, Covent Garden in London, Amsterdam and Bucarest.

From 1922 she devoted herself exclusively to concert and Lied singing. She also worked as a music teacher and singing teacher.

== Bibliography ==
- Kutsch/Riemens: Gmeiner, Ella, in: Großes Sängerlexikon, p. 9113 (vgl. Sängerlex. Bd. 2, p. 1352) (c) Verlag K.G. Saur
