= Mascia Predit =

Latvian actress and opera singer (1912–2001)

- Cover for Mascia Predit

Background information
- Born: December 21, 1912; Dvinsk, Latvia, Russian Empire
- Died: October 7, 2001 (aged 88) Baltimore, Maryland, US
- Genre: opera
- Occupations: opera singer, actress, voice teacher

Mascia Predit (December 21, 1912 – October 7, 2001) was a Latvian actress and opera singer. Although she was acclaimed as a singer for her strong soprano voice and intense interpretation, her career and personal life were disrupted by World War II and its aftermath. Her recordings are rare, but several have been re-released.

== Early career in Europe ==
Born December 21, 1912, in Dvinsk, Russian Empire (now, Daugavpils, Latvia), Predit is described as having grown up in an upper-class home in Riga, Latvia, before World War II. Interested in becoming an actress, she studied with Constantin Stanislavski in Moscow. After her singing voice was discovered by Feodor Chaliapin, a Russian bass, she studied with Salvatore Salvati in Switzerland and Rosina Storchio in Milan, Italy. She toured in Poland, Austria, Switzerland and Italy. In 1946 she sang the role of Ellen Orford in the first broadcast of Benjamin Britten's opera Peter Grimes on Italian radio.

After traveling to Italy during World War II, she was not allowed to return to Latvia. Her husband and the rest of her family, excepting her son, were killed or deported during the Soviet occupation of Latvia. Her son was sent to Siberia.

== Career in England ==
Predit went to London, England where she continued her singing career. During the 1940s and 1950s, she recorded on the labels Cetra and His Master's Voice.

She performed Russian songs with accompanist Gerald Moore, appearing on the BBC Third Programme. Moore included her in his Singer And Accompanist: The Performance Of Fifty Songs. Applauded for her "beautiful recording" showing how Tchaikovsky's At the Ball should be sung. Moore notes her use of voix blanche, and commends the strength and control underlying "the expressive rise and fall of the vocal line": "The intelligent listener will feel this iron hand in the velvet glove." Some of the songs she performed with Moore have been re-released by Naxos.

A 1952 monophonic recording of Predit singing songs by Modest Mussorgsky with orchestra conducted by Igor Markevitch, was re-released by Audite in 2009.

"She had a rich voice of the Slavic type without the unpleasant edge that can seep into the top of the range and she absolutely relishes the text without destroying the melodic line. In a word, she’s terrific."

Predit also toured in North America. She reportedly turned down the opportunity to sing Cherubino in The Marriage of Figaro at the Metropolitan Opera.

== Disappearance ==
Predit apparently remarried in Italy in the 1950s. Some time later, she returned to Latvia where she hoped to see her son. Once again she was trapped by borders: this time she was not allowed to leave Latvia. She was eventually presumed legally dead in Italy.

Italian artist Giovanni Omiccioli (Rome 1901-1975) made a portrait of Mascia Predit in 1952 (oil on canvas 50 x 40 cm); this work is published in a book

== Reappearance ==
Predit was finally allowed to leave Latvia in 1970. She appeared in a cameo in Luchino Visconti's film Death in Venice (1971). As an aristocratic Russian tourist, she sings a haunting Mussorgsky Lullaby to a deserted beach. She was credited as "Masha Predit".

She was included in The Russian and Slavonic Schools section of the classical collection The Record of Singing, Volume 4: From 1939 to the End of the 78 Era.

Predit moved to the United States, teaching voice at the Longy School of Music in Cambridge, Massachusetts, and the Catholic University of America in Washington, DC. She eventually retired in Wilmington, Delaware before moving to a nursing home in Baltimore where she died on October 7, 2001, aged 88.

Her recordings are rare, but a new release of her work was created by Philadelphia sound archivist Ward Marston on his personal label as of 2016. Opera Delaware music director Jeffrey Miller helped to find earlier recordings for use in the project.

"She had a shimmering quality to her voice . . . and every note that comes out of her mouth is connected to intent. There's not one empty note on the entire CD. So that's great singing." Jeffrey Miller.

== Selected discography ==
- Il Clearco in Negroponte: aria di Adrasto (in Italian). La Voce del Padrone. OCLC 1115259477.
- Original-soundtrack des Films von Luchino Visconti "Der Tod in Venedig." (in German). RCA Victor. 1971. OCLC 216114089.
- Markevitch, Igor, Predit, Mascia, others (2009). Symphony no. 3 (in Russian). Audite. OCLC 767880427.
- Mascia Predit (CD). Lagniappe. Marston Records. 2015. OCLC 1003588660.
