= Lula Mysz-Gmeiner =

German academic voice teacher (1876–1948)

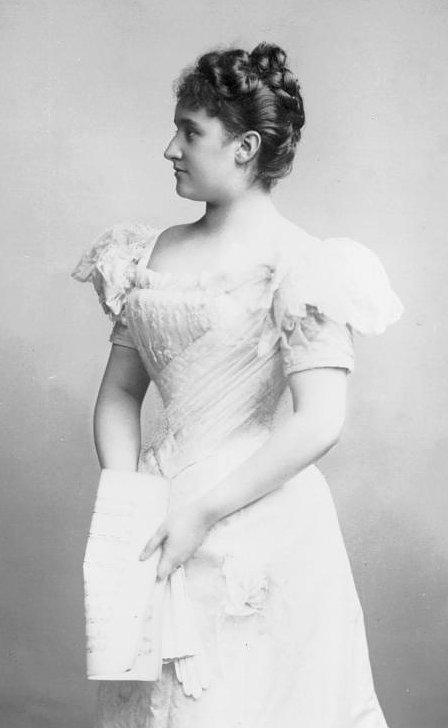
- Born: Julie Sophie Gmeiner; 15 August 1876; Brassó (Kronstadt), Austria-Hungary (today Brașov, Romania)
- Died: 7 August 1948 (aged 71); Schwerin, Germany
- Occupations: Contralto; Academic voice teacher
- Organizations: Musikhochschule Berlin
- Awards: Kammersängerin

Lula Mysz-Gmeiner (born Julie Sophie Gmeiner; 15 August 1876 – 7 August 1948) was a German concert contralto and mezzo-soprano born in Transylvania, who performed lieder recitals in Europe and the United States. She was an academic voice teacher in Berlin and taught both Elisabeth Schwarzkopf and Peter Anders.

== Career ==
She was born Julie Sophie Gmeiner in Kronstadt (Brassó), in the region of Transylvania, in Austria-Hungary (today Brașov, Romania). She was the third of ten siblings, called Lula. The children received early musical instruction, and several of her siblings also became professional musicians: the mezzo-soprano Ella Gmeiner, the bass-baritone Rudolf Gmeiner, the cellist Julius Gmeiner, and the pianist Luise Gmeiner.

Lula learned the violin at age six and played in the Kronstadt orchestra at age 15. A year later, she began voice lessons with the composer Rudolf Lassel, who dedicated a composition to her and premiered it with her. From age 18, she studied at the Vienna Conservatory with Gustav Walter, a notable voice teacher of the time. About 1898, she moved to Berlin, where she studied with Emilie Herzog, Etelka Gerster and Lilli Lehmann.

She performed Lieder by Johannes Brahms, Robert Schumann, Franz Schubert, Gustav Mahler, Richard Strauss, and Max Reger, among others, many of them written for her or dedicated to her. She married the Transylvanian engineer Ernst Mysz in Kronstadt in 1900. The couple had three daughters, two of whom died young, while the third, Susanne, would marry the tenor Peter Anders, who studied with her mother.

Lula Mysz-Gmeiner was awarded the title of an Austrian-Hungarian Kammersänger in 1905. She made concert tours in Europe and the United States. She often collaborated with the pianists Eduard Behm, Emil Mattiesen, Arthur Nikisch, Siegfried Ochs, and Reger. Reger dedicated several lieder to her including his Vier Gesänge, Op. 88, published in 1905. She also appeared in concerts, singing for example the Alto Rhapsody by Johannes Brahms and Lieder by Hugo Wolf with the Berlin Philharmonic, conducted by Oskar Fried, on 8 April 1907. In October 1923, she sang in two concerts of a program in memory of Reger at St. Nikolai in Kiel. Fritz Stein conducted the Oratorienverein and the Städtisches Orchester in Die Nonnen, Requiem and Der 100. Psalm.

From 1920, she was a voice teacher at the Staatlich akademische Hochschule für Musik zu Berlin. Among her students were Carla Henius, Maria Müller, Elisabeth Schwarzkopf and Carla Spletter. She lost her apartment in Berlin during World War II and taught from 1945 at the Landesakademie in Schwerin. She died in Schwerin on 7 August 1948.
