= The Canterbury Pilgrims (De Koven) =

Opera

- Opera by Reginald De Koven
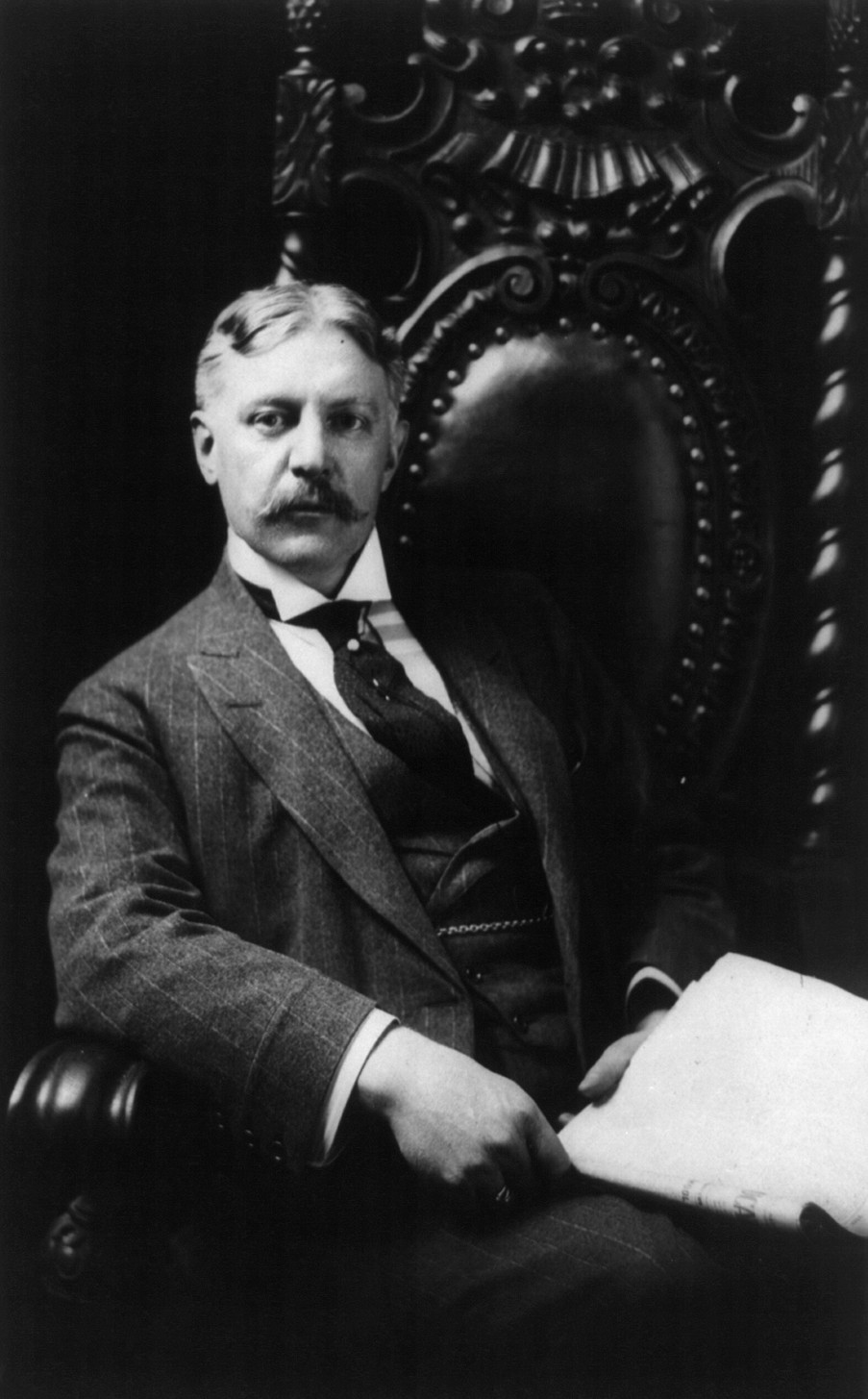
- The composer in 1904
- Librettist: Percy MacKaye
- Language: English
- Based on: The Canterbury Tales by Geoffrey Chaucer
- Premiere: March 8, 1917; Metropolitan Opera House

The Canterbury Pilgrims is an opera by the American composer Reginald De Koven. It premiered at the Metropolitan Opera House on March 8, 1917 just as the United States was on the verge of declaring war on Germany. The unfolding world events caused its cancellation after just five performances. The libretto, written by Percy MacKaye, is loosely based on Geoffrey Chaucer's The Canterbury Tales.

== Roles ==
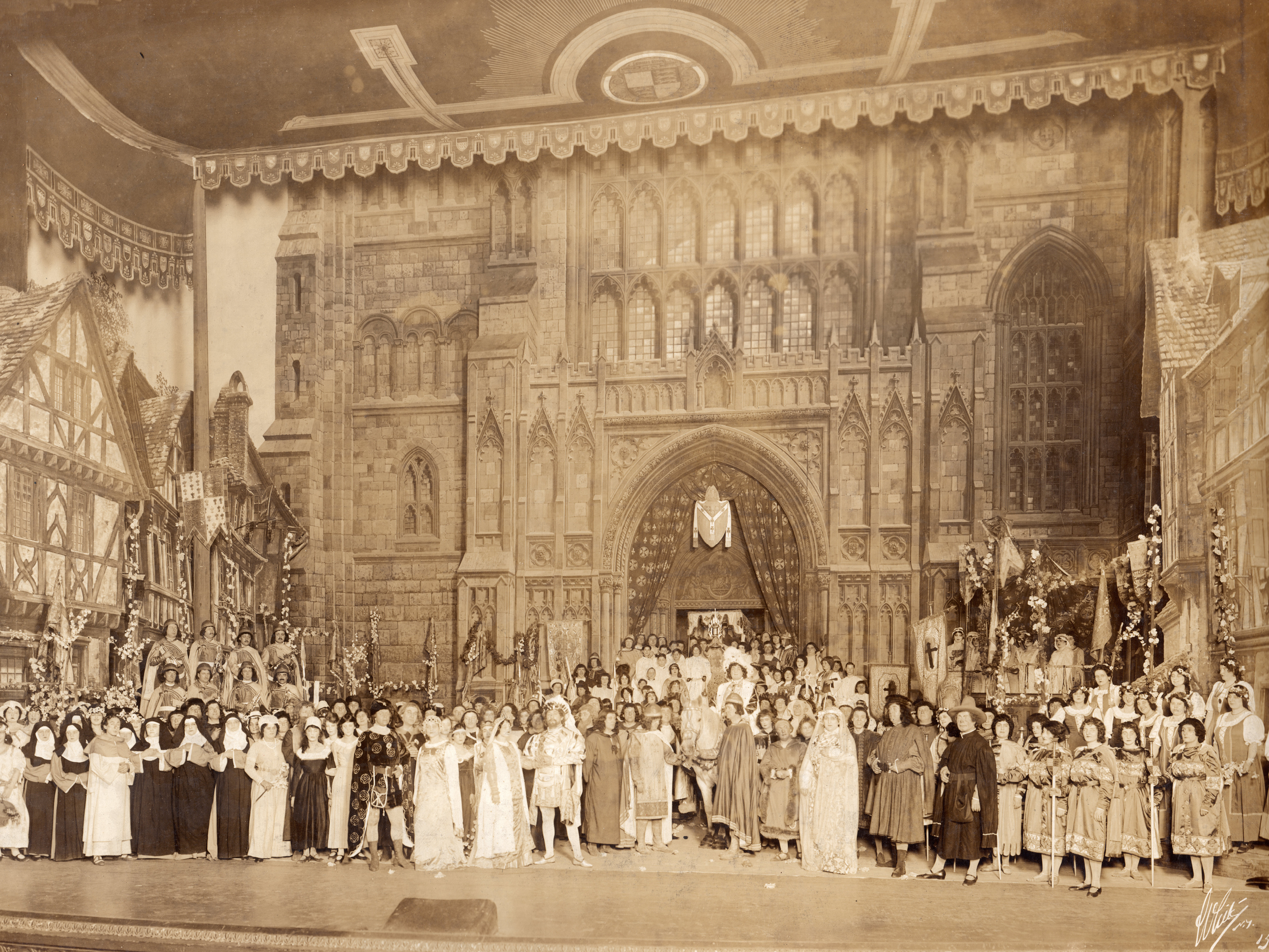
Scene from The Canterbury Pilgrims

Role	Voice type	Premiere cast, 8 March 1917 (Conductor: Artur Bodanzky)
Chaucer	baritone	Johannes Sembach
Alisoun, The Wife of Bath	contralto	Margarethe Arndt-Ober
The Prioress	soprano	Edith Mason
The Squire	tenor	Paul Althouse
King Richard II	tenor	Albert Reiss
Johanna	soprano	Marie Sundelius
The Friar	tenor	Max Bloch
The Knight	baritone	Robert Leonhardt
Joannes	tenor	Pietro Audisio
Man of Law	baritone	Robert Leonhardt
The Miller	bass	Basil Ruysdael
The Host	bass	Giulio Rossi
The Herald	bass	Riccardo Tegani
Two Girls		Marie Tiffany, Minnie Egener
The Pardoner	tenor	Julius Bayer
The Summoner	baritone	Carl Schlegel
The Shipman	baritone	Mario Laurenti
The Cook	bass	Pompilio Malatesta

== Synopsis ==
Place: England. Time: April, 1387.

The story has to do with the merry schemes of the Wife of Bath, who has fallen in love with Chaucer who in his turn loves the Prioress, and of her winning of a bet to gain possession of a certain brooch which carries with it Chaucer's promise of marriage. He is finally rescued by Richard II who decides that the Wife may marry a sixth time only on condition that she marry a miller. A devoted miller joyfully accepts the opportunity and the Prioress and Chaucer are reconciled.
