= Andrew Black (baritone) =

Scottish baritone

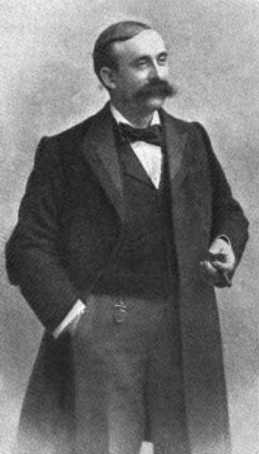
- In The Sketch, 1 July 1903
- Born: 15 January 1859; Glasgow, Scotland
- Died: 15 September 1920 (aged 61); Sydney, Australia
- Burial place: South Head Cemetery
- Occupation: Vocalist

Andrew Black (15 January 1859 – 15 September 1920) was a Scottish baritone who was primarily known for his performances in oratorios and other works from the concert repertoire. He was particularly admired for his performances of Felix Mendelssohn's Elijah which he first performed at the Birmingham Triennial Music Festival in 1894. He made several recordings for the Gramophone Company in London from 1901-1906 which are chronicled in volume one of The Record of Singing.

== Biography ==
Andrew Black was born in Glasgow on 15 January 1859. He began his career as a church organist with the United Presbyterian Church in Glasgow. He then studied singing with Alberto Randegger and John B. Welch in London, and later with Domenico Scafati in Milan. He began his career as a concert singer in Scotland, and had his first major critical success in 1887 at The Crystal Palace in London. In 1892 he made his debut at the Leeds Festival as the Spectre in Antonín Dvořák's The Spectre's Bride. In 1893 he was the tenor soloist in the world premiere of Dvořák's Mass in D major, and in 1903 he sang the role of Judas in the world premiere of Edward Elgar's The Apostles. He was appointed to the staff of the Royal Northern College of Music in 1893.

Following the death of his wife, a sister of Ivan Caryll, Black left for Australia on account of his health, and settled in Sydney. He subsequently toured Australia to great acclaim. He married a widow, Mrs Lichtscheindel.

He died on the morning of 15 September 1920 at his residence, the Cafe Français, George Street, Sydney. His remains were buried at the South Head Cemetery. Mrs Black was among those at the funeral.
