= Johannes Sembach =

German tenor (1881–1944)

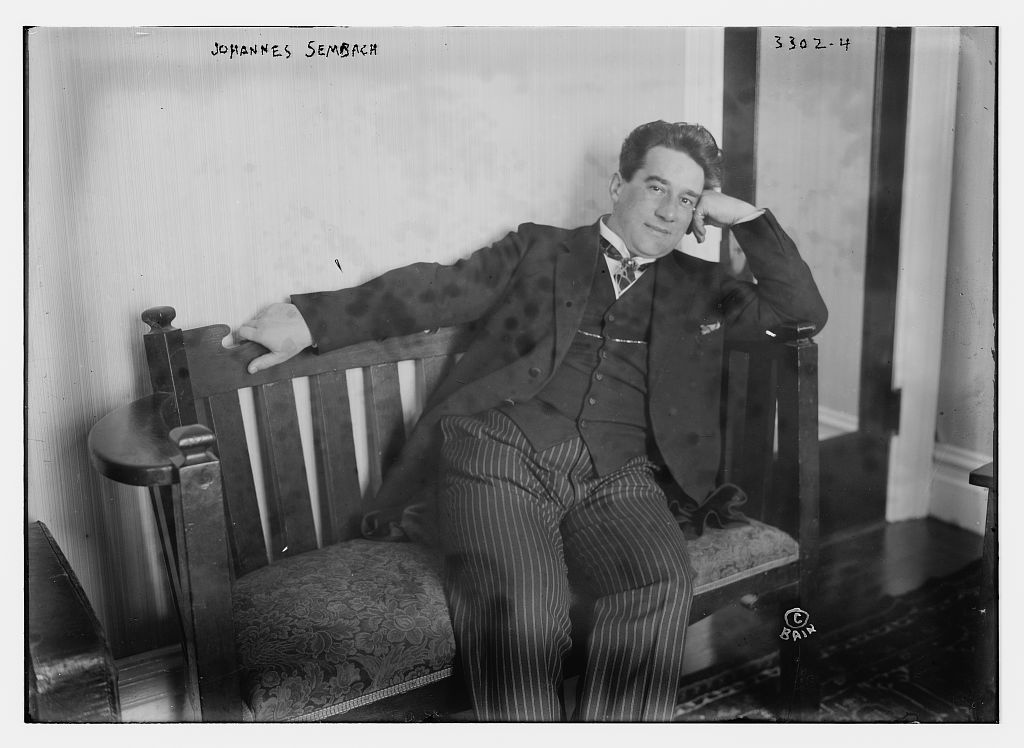
Johannes Sembach in 1914

Johannes Sembach (March 9, 1881 – June 20, 1944), also known as Johannes Semfke, began his musical career in German operetta and achieved international fame as a leading tenor in German opera, especially the works of Richard Wagner.

== Biography ==
Sembach was born Johannes Semfke in Berlin to glass craftsman Eduard Semfke and his wife Friederike Becker. His musical talent led to early work as an organist, choir director, and composer, publishing several compositions while still a teenager. He began vocal studies at the Stern Conservatory in 1899 as a baritone, but soon left to join the roster of the Apollo-Theater, an operetta and vaudeville entertainment palace in Berlin. Handsome, hardworking, and a superb musician, Sembach thrived at the Apollo from 1901 to 1904, appearing in several operettas by the Apollo's music director, Paul Lincke, including Frau Luna, Lysistrata, Nakiris Hochzeit, and Im Reiche des Indra.

In 1904 he auditioned for Gustav Mahler, then director of the Vienna Opera, and was offered a contract. Leaving the name "Semfke" and baritone roles behind, Sembach joined the Vienna Opera as a tenor and made his debut as Moser in Wagner's Die Meistersinger von Nürnberg on November 13, 1904. For three seasons, he sang primarily smaller roles in Vienna along with a few leading roles. In 1907 he joined the Dresden Opera, making his debut as Don José in Carmen on August 18. In Dresden, Sembach participated in many important performances including the Dresden premiere of Puccini's Madama Butterfly with Minnie Nast as Cio-Cio San and as Aegisth in the world premiere of Strauss's Elektra on January 25, 1909.

Sembach secured a leave from his Dresden post in 1911 to study with legendary tenor Jean de Reszke in Paris, staying with the tenor for a year and a half. He reemerged as a performer in 1913, singing in London, Berlin, Munich, and Paris. He joined the roster of the Metropolitan Opera in 1914 where he debuted in the title role of Wagner's Parsifal on November 26 and became known for the lyricism and beauty he brought to heldentenor roles in the Wagnerian repertory. In 1916 he performed the title role in Wagner's Siegfried in several open-air performances as part of a stadium tour of the northeast and midwest. Along with his achievement in works by Wagner, Sembach sang Pylades in the Met premiere of Gluck's Iphigénie en Tauride (performed in German as Iphigenie auf Tauris) on November 25, 1916, and the role of Chaucer in the world premiere of Reginald De Koven's The Canterbury Pilgrims. He sang in the American premieres of two works by his former mentor Gustav Mahler: Das Lied von der Erde with the Philadelphia Orchestra on December 15, 1916 and Lieder eines fahrenden Gesellen a month later in New York.

Due to growing anti-German sentiment and the formal entry of the United States into World War I, Sembach's Met contract, along with those of several other German members of the company, was abruptly cancelled on November 2, 1917. The tenor remained in the United States throughout the war, working occasionally with German colleagues in an ensemble called the Madrigal Quartet.

Of all of the German artists dismissed in 1917, Sembach was the only one to return to the Met after the war. During the 1920/21 season, he performed in Tristan und Isolde, Lohengrin, and Parsifal in English before these operas were reinstated in the repertory in their original language the following season. Following the illness of Enrico Caruso, Sembach also took on that tenor's assignment in Saint-Saëns' Samson et Dalila, though he did achieve success as Samson. His contract was not renewed after the 1921/22 season and Sembach returned to Germany, where he occasionally appeared as a guest artist in Hamburg, Berlin, and Dresden. After two barn-storming tours across the United States with soprano Johanna Gadski's German Grand Opera company which produced dozens of performances of Wagner's Ring of the Nibelung between 1929 and 1931, Sembach retired from the stage to teach voice in Berlin.

During the last year of World War II, Sembach fled the German capital for Bremerhaven where he died on June 20, 1944, presumably from injuries sustained during the June 18 bombing of the city by Allied forces.

== Recordings ==
Johannes Sembach made more than 150 recordings during a recording career that spanned 33 years. His earliest recordings as a baritone – 82 sides between 1900 and 1904 of German popular music, operetta, and lieder – were made for The Gramophone Company and issued under his given name, Johannes Semfke, while others were released under the pseudonym Siegfried Steiner for Gramophone's budget imprint, Zon-o-phone. Between 1905 and 1921, he recorded opera and lieder for Lyrophon, Gramophone, Columbia, and Vox. His final recordings were made for Clangor Records in Berlin in 1933 and feature excerpts from Fidelio, Cavalleria Rusticana, and two of his own compositions.
