= Zinaida Jurjewskaja =

Estonian operatic soprano (1892–1925)

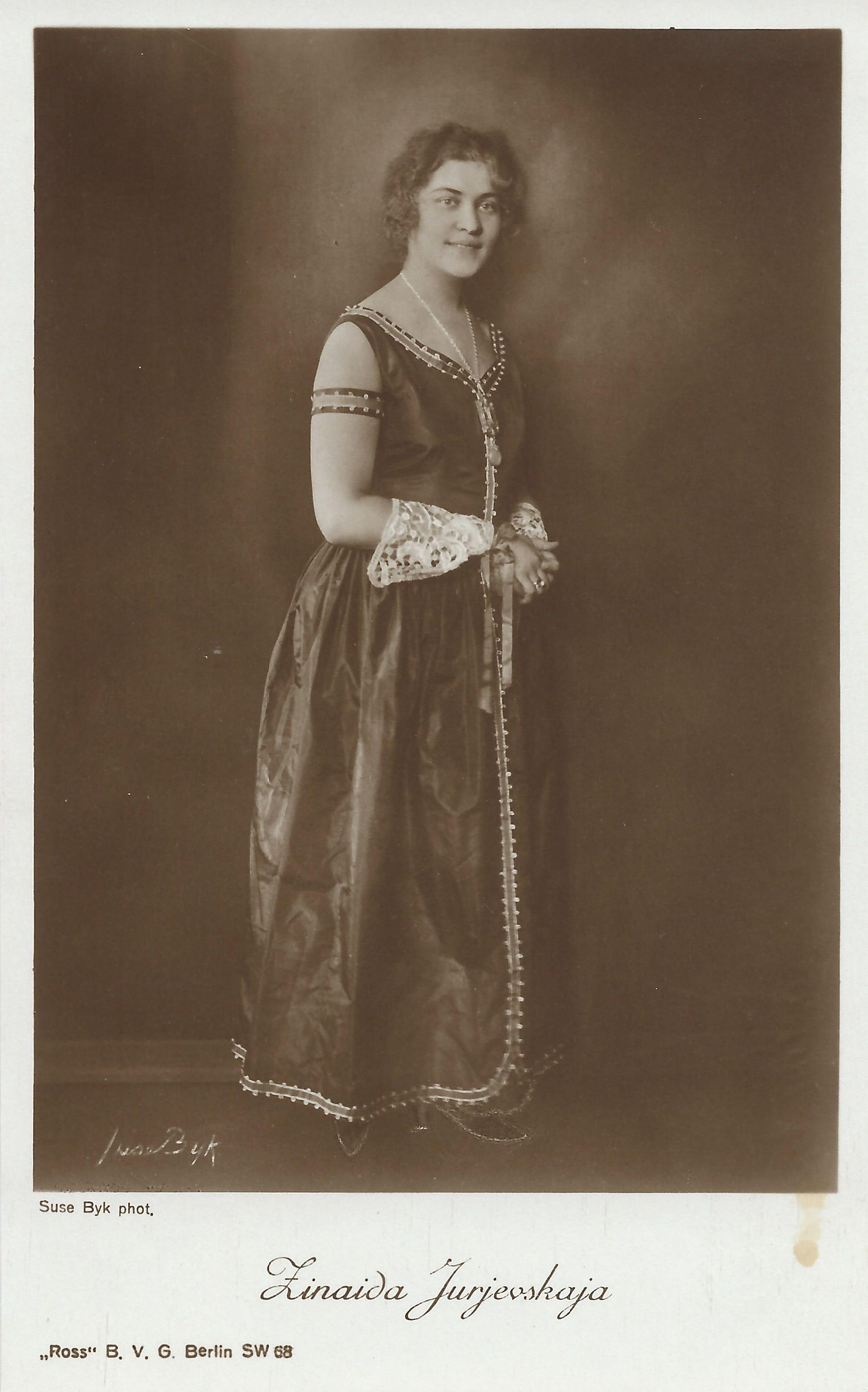
Photograph by Suse Byk, c. 1923

Zinaida Jurjewskaja (10 June 1892 – 3 December 1925; née Lenkin, married name Zinaida von Bremer) was an Estonian-born German operatic soprano singer. Alternative spellings of her surname found in sources include Jurjevskaja, Jurievskaia Yurievskaja and Yuryevskaja. She adopted this as her stage name as a tribute to her birthplace.

Zinaida Lenkina was born in Tartu, Estonia, on 19 June 1892. She was an intelligent child, speaking Estonian, German and Russian, and started to play the piano at the age of six. She graduated from the Tartu Puškin Girls' Gymnasium aged 15. She began studying in the history-philology department of the Tartu Higher Women's Course, but in 1912 moved to the Saint Petersburg Conservatory to study singing with Alma Fohström. She had met guards officer Georg von Brehmer (1890–1935) at Kuressaare in 1908, and met him again in St Petersburg. They married in 1918, the year in which she graduated from the conservatory.

She had a successful singing career in Estonia and then moved to the Berlin Opera House. Her first performance there, in 1922, was in Rimsky-Korsakov's The Golden Cockerel, and in 1924 she took the title role in the first Berlin performance of Janáček's Jenůfa. The Czech artist Emil Orlik painted her portrait, titled Sinaida Jurjewskaja, which is held in the National Gallery Prague. She made several recordings for Homocord, Parlophone and Deutsche Grammophon.

She died in Andermatt, Switzerland, apparently jumping into the Schöllenen Gorge from the Teufelsbrücke (Devil's Bridge) after attempting to cut her wrist and taking poison. Her body was recovered from the frozen river in the spring of 1926. Her disappearance and death were reported internationally.

Her husband commissioned a bas-relief plaque commemorating Jurjewskaja, with the words "Remember me", which was placed on their home at 41 Puiestee street, Tartu, in 1926, and unveiled by the mayor. The house was destroyed by fire in 1944. He also had a statue of her, dressed in her costume for the role of Marfana in Rimsky-Kirsakoff's The Tsar's Bride, erected in Andermatt, and wrote a memorial book Zinaida Jurjevskaja kuulsus ja Kolgata (Zinaida Jurjevskaja's Fame and Calvary)
