= Peter Anders (tenor) =

German opera singer (1908–1954)

External audio
- Shellac recordings with Peter Anders in the Online Archive of the Österreichische Mediathek
- Peter Anders sings Schubert on YouTube
- Richard Wagner: Lohengrin: "In fernem Land" - Chor und Sinfonieorchester des Kölner Rundfunks; Conductor: Richard Kraus; November, 1951

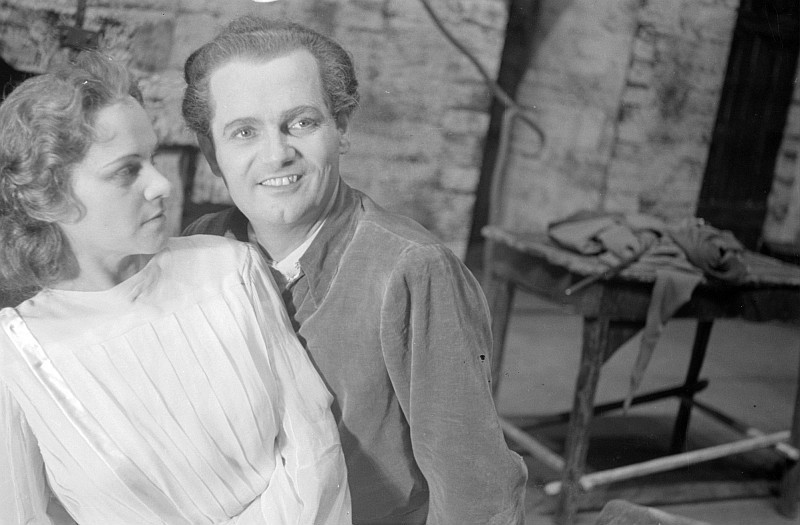
Peter Anders

Peter Anders (1 July 1908 – 10 September 1954) was a German operatic tenor who sang a wide range of parts in the German, Italian, and French repertories. He began by singing lyric roles and later took dramatic roles with equal success. He was also a prominent lieder singer.

== Life and career ==
Anders was born in Essen and studied at the Berlin Music Academy with Ernst Grenzebach, and later privately with Lula Mysz-Gmeiner, whose daughter Susanne he married. In 1931, he appeared in Berlin in La belle Hélène, and made his operatic debut the following year in Heidelberg, as Jacquino in Fidelio.

He sang in Darmstadt (1933–35), Cologne (1935–36), Hannover (1937–38), and then at the Munich State Opera (1938–40), where he took part in the creation of Strauss's Friedenstag. He returned next to Berlin and sang at the Berlin State Opera from 1940 until 1948. His repertory at that time included lyric roles such as Belmonte, Tamino, Lyonel, Hans, Hoffmann, Leukippos, Alfredo, Eisenstein and Rodolfo.

Beginning in 1949, Anders undertook heavier roles (e.g., Florestan, Max, Tannhäuser, Lohengrin, Walther, Siegmund, Radames, Otello) with equal success.

He made a few guest appearances at the Royal Opera House in London, La Monnaie in Brussels and Teatro di San Carlo in Naples, as well as appearing at the Glyndebourne Festival.

Anders sang not only an impressive range of operatic roles but also appeared in several operetta parts. He performed regularly on German radio and in concert and was also active in oratorio and lieder recitals.

He became a favorite of Adolf Hitler's regime and was not required to serve in the armed forces during the Second World War - instead entertaining German troops and participating in propaganda events. These activities tainted his reputation in the post-war world.

While at the height of his career, Anders died in a car accident in Hamburg at the age of 46. He made many recordings which have been reissued on CD.

== Sources ==
- Operissimo.com
