= Michael Scott (opera director) =

Author and impresario (died 2019)

Michael Scott was the founder of the London Opera Society. In his role as the society's sole artistic director, he brought to London Marilyn Horne, Joan Sutherland, and Boris Christoff. He was also responsible for introducing Sherrill Milnes, Ruggero Raimondi, and Montserrat Caballé. He was a highly regarded expert in the field of opera with an extensive knowledge of the history of vocal music, and his books include volumes 1 and 2 of The Record of Singing and The Great Caruso. In 1992, he also wrote Maria Meneghini Callas, being one of the few Maria Callas biographers to have seen her frequently on stage in her prime. He was also a contributor to Opera News.

In the review of this book for Opera News, Albert Innaurato writes, "His is the only biography to understand how Callas compares with and differs from Tetrazzini, Ponselle and Patti. And since Scott is neither a hysteric nor a fan, he is just and interesting in comparing Callas with Tebaldi and Sutherland. In fact his crisp, unsentimental manner may unsettle some readers—he responds to Callas as an artist, not as a tragedy queen, and does not linger over her miserable last years or indulge in psychologizing."

Michael Scott died in Minehead, England, on 6 April 2019, at the age of 84.
