= Olive Fremstad =

American opera singer (1871–1951)

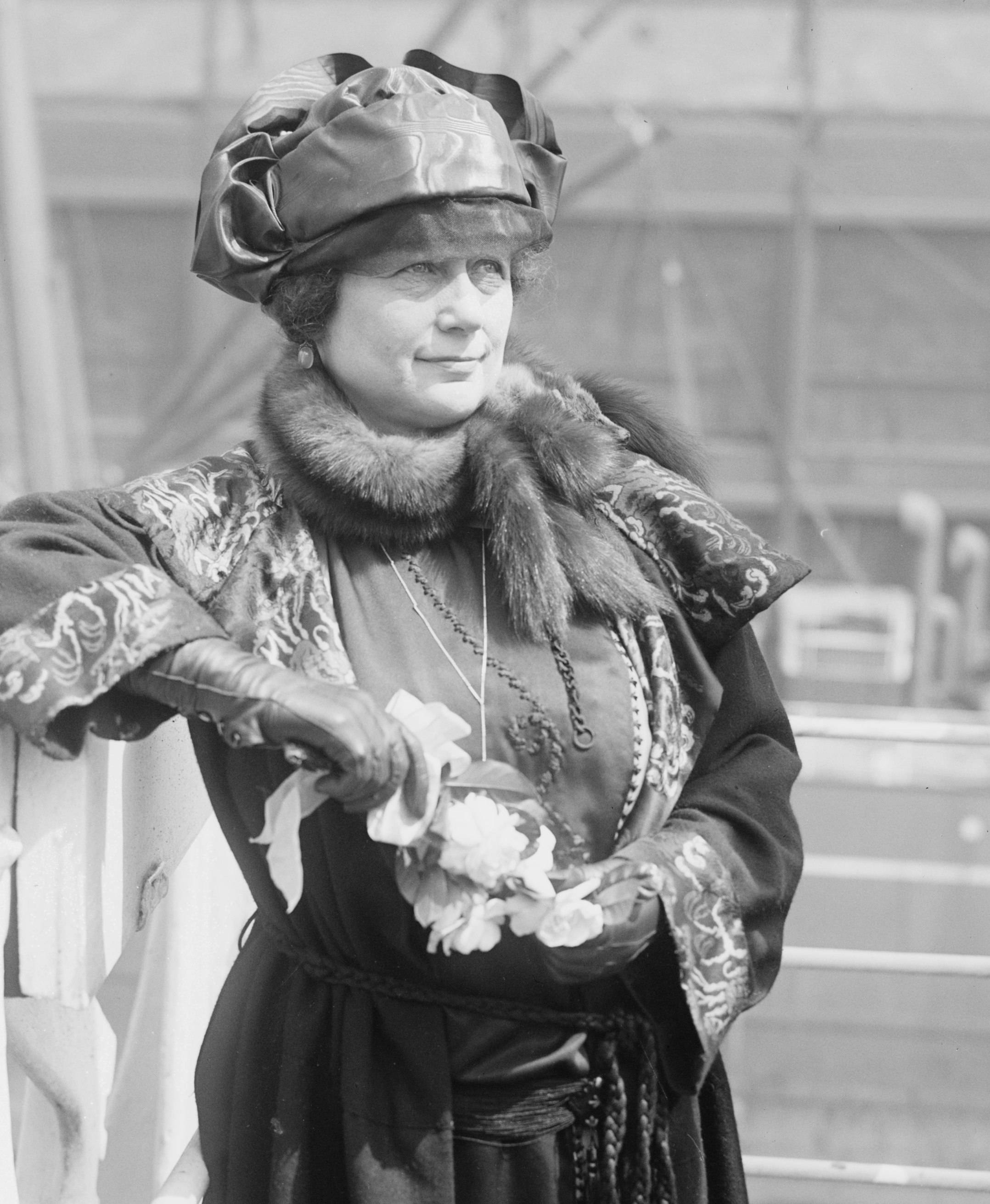
Fremstad in 1915

Olive Fremstad (14 March 1871 – 21 April 1951) was the stage name of Anna Olivia Rundquist, a celebrated Swedish-American dramatic soprano who sang in both the mezzo-soprano and soprano ranges.

== Background ==
Born in Stockholm, she received her early education and musical training in Christiania, Norway. When she was 12 years of age her parents moved to America, settling in Minneapolis, Minnesota. Even before leaving Christiania, her progress on the piano had been such that she had appeared as an infant prodigy. She was adopted by an American couple living in St. Peter, Minnesota, taking on their surname of Fremstad. In St. Peter, she worked as a church organist at the local Swedish Lutheran Church. She began her vocal training in New York City with Frederick Bristol in 1890 after singing in church choirs, then studied in Berlin with Lilli Lehmann before making her operatic debut as a mezzo-soprano as Azucena in Verdi's Il trovatore at the Cologne Opera in 1895. She remained there for at least three years, before going on to Vienna, Munich, Bayreuth and London.

== Career ==
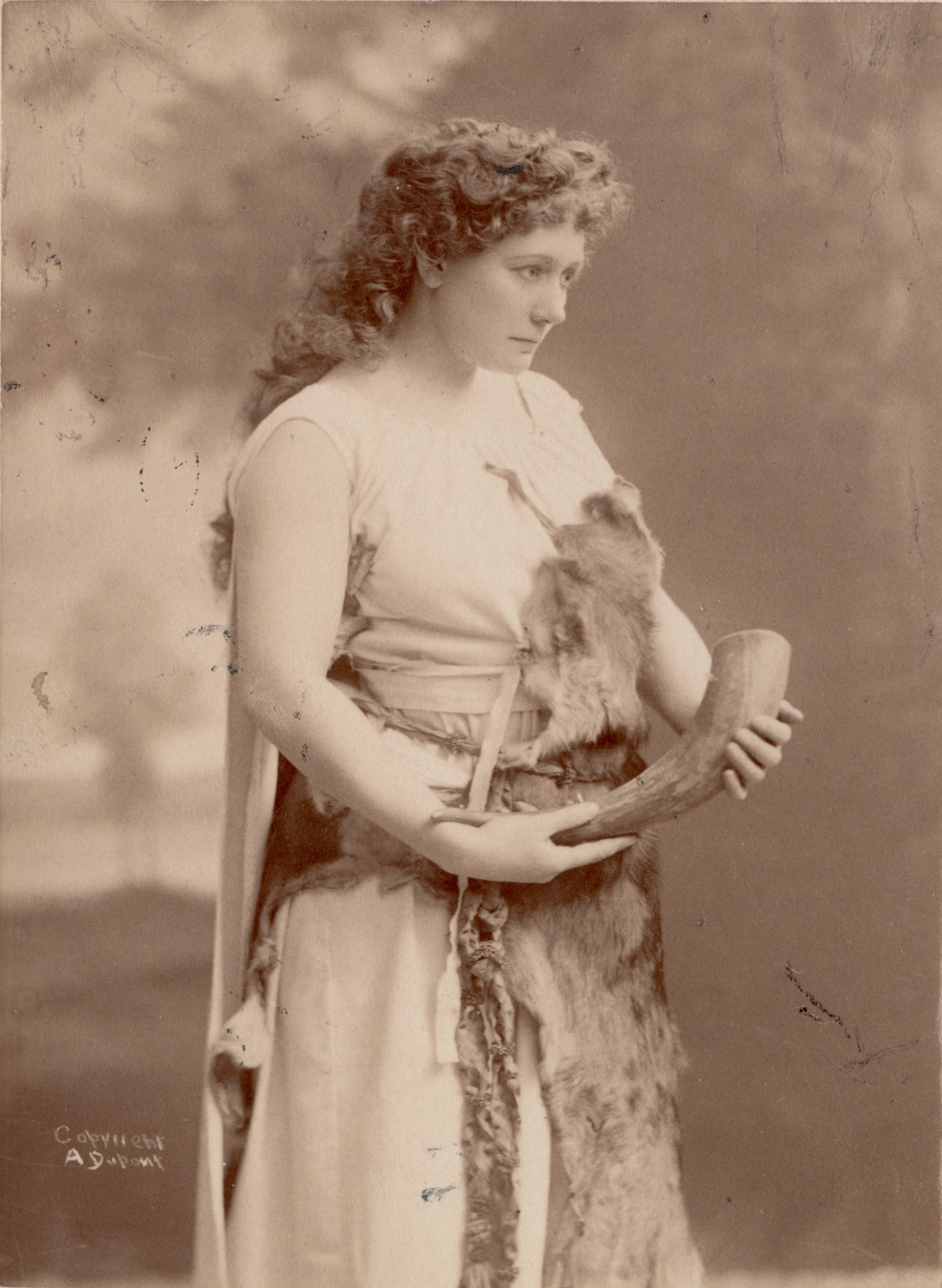
Fremstad in 1906, photographed in the studio of Aimé Dupont

She appeared at the Metropolitan Opera in New York City from 1903 until 1914, specializing in Wagnerian roles. By that time she was singing as a dramatic soprano. Fremstad appeared before the public 351 times as a member of the Met's stellar roster, most frequently as Venus in Tannhäuser, Kundry in Parsifal, Sieglinde, Isolde and Elsa in Lohengrin. American audiences never warmed much to her interpretation of the title role in Bizet's Carmen, but she had sung the role opposite Enrico Caruso in San Francisco the night before the city was wrecked by the 1906 San Francisco earthquake and ensuing fire. (She and Caruso escaped the disaster unharmed.) Later in her career, Fremstad experienced difficulties with the top notes of the dramatic soprano range. She retired from professional singing in 1920 and briefly attempted teaching, but her patience for anything less than perfection in her pupils proved to be slim. One "lesson" involved the close examination of a dissected human head preserved in a jar. The head was kept on a prominent shelf, right as you came into her studio. She was mystified when her few students fled in horror, unwilling to study the human larynx in such a setting. She used this head as a tool for determining whether or not prospective students had the "mettle" for an opera career. For Fremstad, this wasn't anything special; when studying for the role of Salome in the Metropolitan's premier production, she had gone to the morgue in New York to find out just how much she should stagger under the weight of the head of John the Baptist.

Her output of recordings is meager. In fact, she believed that recordings could not capture the magic of her performance, and insisted that people hear her live. She made approximately 40 recordings from 1911 to 1915, only 15 of which were ever released. Music critic J.B. Steane has called Fremstad "one of the greatest of Wagnerians"; but in his The Record of Singing, Volume 1, the opera historian Michael Scott describes her as always being more of a mezzo-soprano than a genuine soprano. Scott, however, acknowledges her impressive qualities as an interpretive artist.

Fremstad allegedly professed to have no interest in romantic entanglements. However, she wed twice, with both marriages ending in divorce. She and her secretary, Mary Watkins Cushing, also lived together for some time. She died in Irvington, New York, but was buried alongside her parents in a family plot in the village cemetery in Grantsburg, Wisconsin.

Fremstad was the model for Thea Kronborg, the heroine of Willa Cather's novel The Song of the Lark. Her relationship with Cushing was fictionalized in the novel Of Lena Geyer, by Marcia Davenport.

== Other sources ==
- Cushing, Mary Fitch Watkins. The Rainbow Bridge, a biography of Olive Fremstad (G. P. Putnam's Sons, 1954) OCLC 1077855272
- Rosenthal, H. and Warrack, J. The Concise Oxford Dictionary of Opera (2nd Edition, Oxford University Press. pp. 180–181. 1979)
- Steane, J.B., The Grand Tradition: Seventy Years of Singing on Record (Charles Scribner's Sons, 1974)
- Scott, Michael, The Record of Singing, Volume 1 (Duckworth, London, 1977), ISBN 978-0-7156-1030-5
