= Daphne (opera) =

Opera by Richard Strauss

- Opera by Richard Strauss
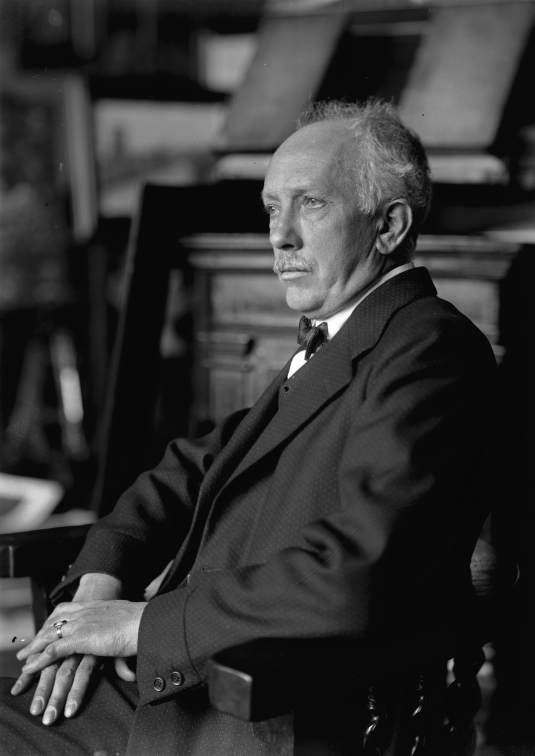
- The composer in 1922 (Photographer Schmutzer)
- Librettist: Joseph Gregor
- Language: German
- Premiere: 2 October 1938; Semperoper, Dresden

Daphne, Op. 82, is an opera in one act by Richard Strauss, subtitled "Bucolic Tragedy in One Act". The German libretto was by Joseph Gregor. The opera is based loosely on the mythological figure Daphne from Ovid's Metamorphoses and includes elements taken from The Bacchae by Euripides.

== Performance history ==
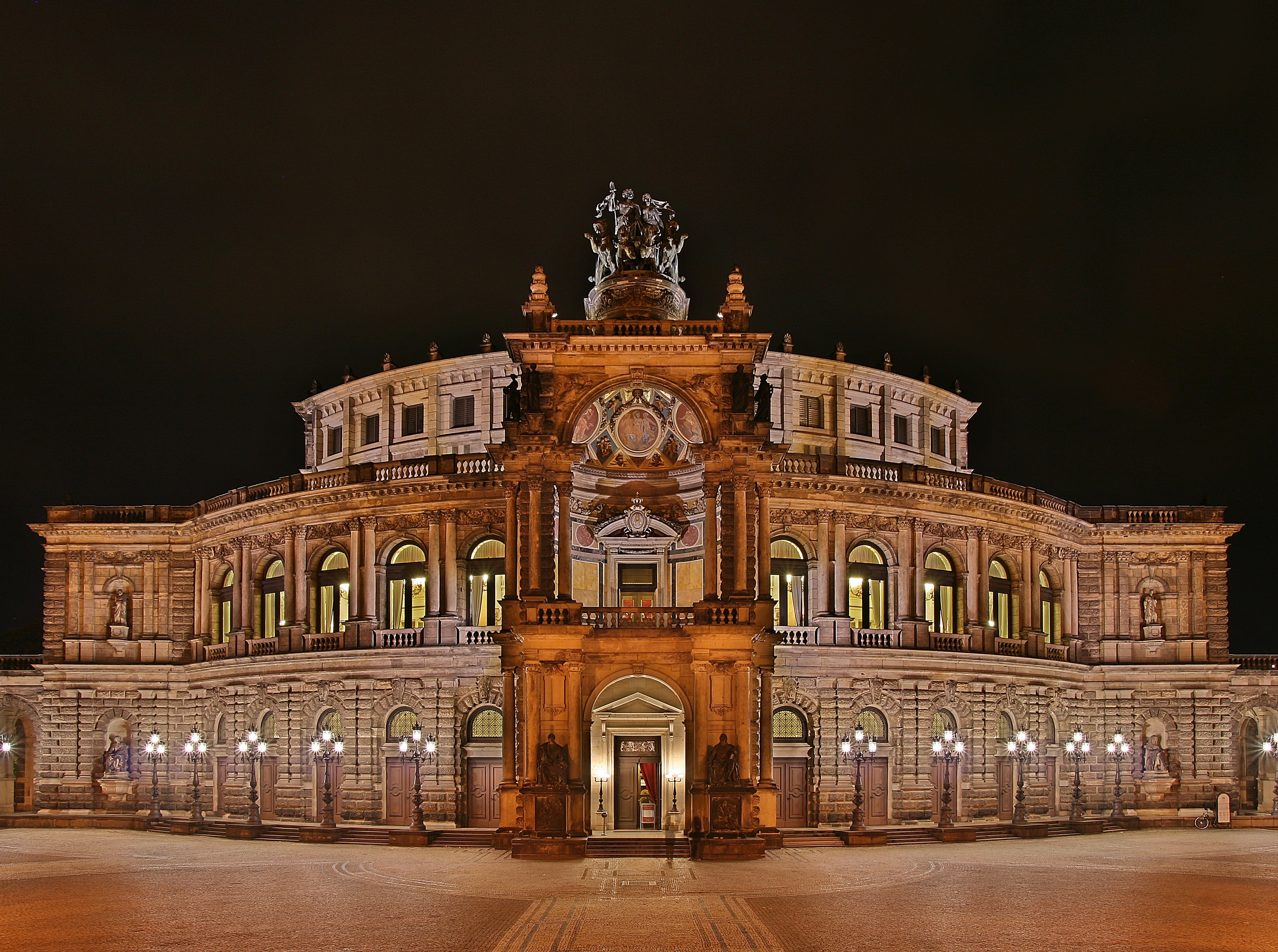
The Semperoper

The first performance of the opera took place at the Semperoper in Dresden on 15 October 1938. It was originally intended as a double bill with Strauss' Friedenstag, but as the scale of Daphne grew, that idea was abandoned. The conductor of the first performance was Karl Böhm, to whom the opera was dedicated. The United States premiere of the opera was performed on October 10, 1960 in a concert version at Town Hall in Manhattan with Gloria Davy in the title role, Florence Kopleff as Gaea, Robert Nagy as Leukippos, Jon Crain as Apollo, Lawrence Davidson as Peneios, and The Little Orchestra Society under conductor Thomas Scherman.

== Roles ==
Role	Voice type	Premiere cast, 15 October 1938 (Conductor: Karl Böhm)
Peneios, a fisherman	bass	Sven Nilsson
Gaea, his wife	contralto	Helene Jung
Daphne, their daughter	soprano	Margarete Teschemacher
Leukippos, a shepherd	tenor	Martin Kremer
Apollo	tenor	Torsten Ralf
Four shepherds	baritone, tenor, basses	Arno Schellenberg, Heinrich Tessmer, Hans Löbel, Erich Händel
Two maids	sopranos	Angela Kolniak, Marta Rohs

== Synopsis ==
The chaste girl Daphne sings a hymn of praise to nature. She loves the sunlight as trees and flowers do, but she has no interest in human romance. She cannot return the love of her childhood friend Leukippos, and she refuses to put on the ceremonial clothes for the coming festival of Dionysos, leaving Leukippos with the dress she has rejected.

Daphne's father Peneios tells his friends he is certain that the gods will soon return among men. He advises preparing a feast to welcome Apollo. Just then a mysterious herdsman appears. Peneios sends for Daphne to care for the visitor.

The strange herdsman tells Daphne that he has watched her from his chariot, and repeats to her phrases from the hymn to nature she sang earlier. He promises her that she need never be parted from the sun, and she accepts his embrace. But when he begins to speak of love she becomes fearful and runs out.

At the festival of Dionysos, Leukippos is among the women wearing Daphne's dress, and he invites her to dance. Believing him to be a woman she agrees, but the strange herdsman stops the dance with a thunderclap and says she has been deceived. Daphne answers that both Leukippos and the stranger are in disguise, and the stranger reveals himself as the sun-god Apollo. Daphne refuses both her suitors, and Apollo pierces Leukippos with an arrow.

Daphne mourns with the dying Leukippos. Apollo is filled with regret. He asks Zeus to give Daphne new life in the form of one of the trees she loves. Daphne is transformed, and she rejoices in her union with nature. This transformation scene, the metamorphosis, is opulently silvery in the string section.

== Recordings ==
Year	Cast: Daphne, Leukippos, Apollo, Paneios, Gaea	Conductor, Opera House and Orchestra	Label
1944	Maria Reining, Anton Dermota, Karl Friedrich, Herbert Alsen, Melanie Frutschnigg	Karl Böhm, Wiener Staatsoper (Vienna) Wiener Staatsoperchor and Wiener Philharmoniker, live	CD: Walhall Eternity Seriess; Cat: WLCD 0147
1948	Rose Bampton, Anton Dermota, Set Svanholm, Ludwig Weber, Lydia Kindermann	Erich Kleiber, Teatro Colón (Buenos Aires) Orchestra and Chorus, live	CD: Preiser Records; Cat: 90371
1950	Anneliese Kupper, Hans Hopf, Georg Hann, Lorenz Fehenberger, Res Fischer	Eugen Jochum, Bavarian State Orchestra and chorus	CD: Preiser Records; Cat: 90487
1964	Hilde Güden, Fritz Wunderlich, James King, Paul Schöffler; Vera Little	Karl Böhm, Vienna Symphony and Vienna State Opera chorus	CD (with cuts): Deutsche Grammophon; Cat: 445 322-2
1982	Lucia Popp, Peter Schreier, Reiner Goldberg, Kurt Moll, Ortrun Wenkel	Bernard Haitink, Bavarian Radio Symphony Orchestra	CD (First uncut complete recording): EMI Classics; Cat: CDS 7 49309-2
2005	Renée Fleming, Michael Schade, Johan Botha, Kwangchul Youn, Anna Larsson	Semyon Bychkov, WDR Symphony Orchestra Cologne (Recorded at the Kölner Philharmonie, 28 February - 12 March 2005)	CD: Decca; Cat: 475 6926
2005	June Anderson, Robert Sacca, Scott Mac Allister, Daniel Lewis Williams, Birgit Remmert	Stefan Anton Reck, Teatro La Fenice orchestra and chorus (Audio and video recordings made at performances in the Teatro La Fenice, June)	CD: Dynamic; Cat: 499/1; Video DVD: Dynamic; Cat.33499
