= Vienna Conservatory =

Vienna Conservatory may refer to:

- University of Music and Performing Arts Vienna, which incorporates the older Vienna Conservatory dating back to 1817, established by the Gesellschaft der Musikfreunde
- Konservatorium Wien University, established in 1938 as Musikschule der Stadt Wien, as of November 2015 Music and Arts University of the City of Vienna

Other music education establishments in Vienna with similar names include:

- Neues Wiener Konservatorium, established in 1909
- Wiener Volkskonservatorium, established in 1923
