= Jacques Urlus =

Dutch opera tenor (1867–1935)

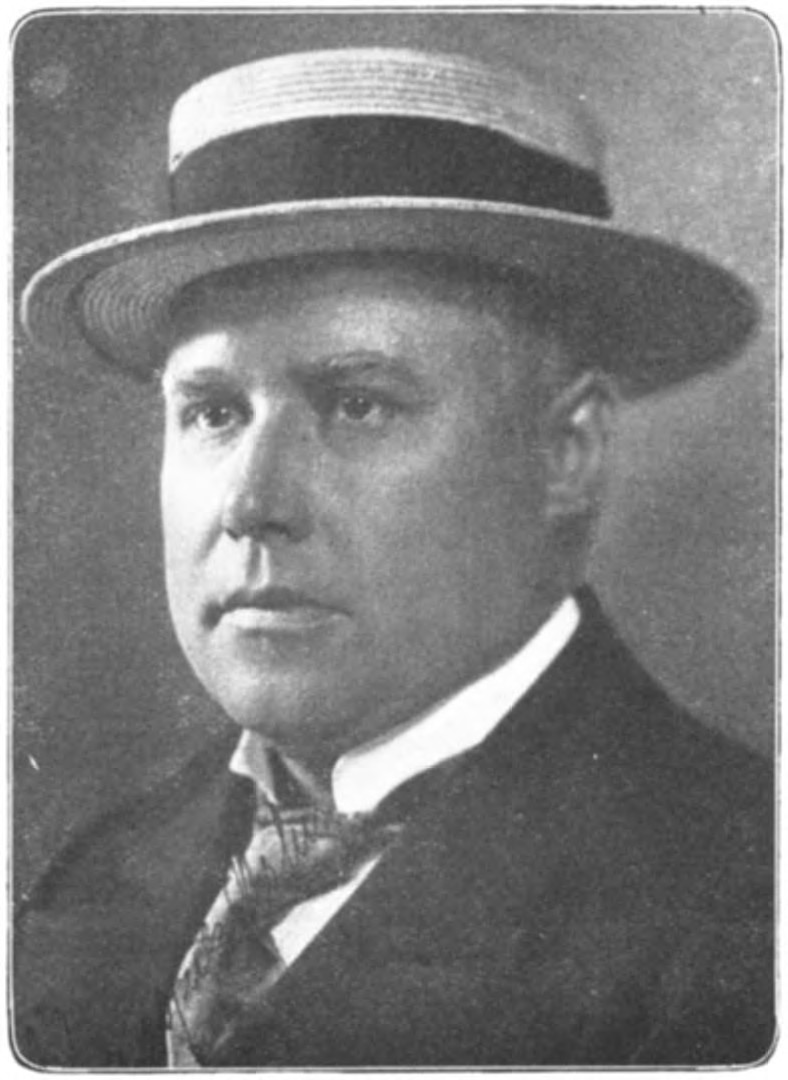
Jacques Urlus ca. 1911

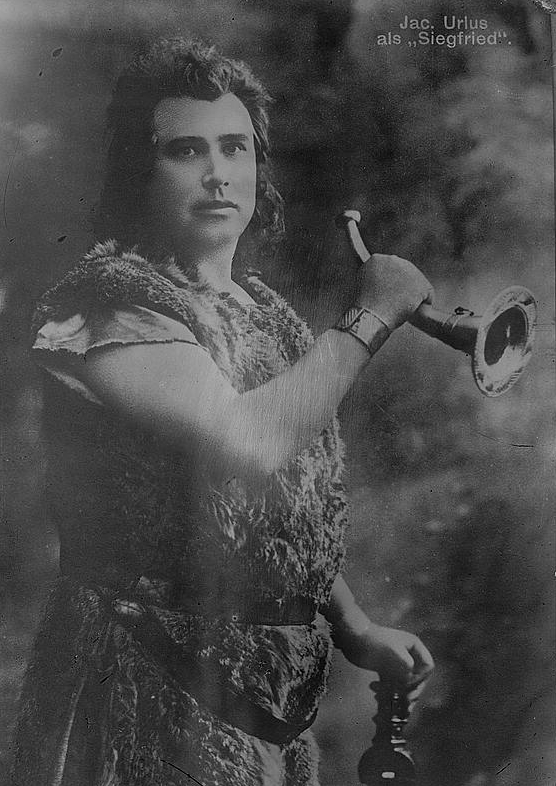
Urlus as Siegfried

Jacques Urlus (6 January 1867 – 6 June 1935) was a Dutch dramatic tenor. He sang to great critical acclaim at major opera houses on both sides of the Atlantic, and his recordings of the music of Richard Wagner are considered to be among the finest ever made.

== Biography ==
Jacques Urlus was born to music-loving Dutch parents in Hergenrath, then in the Rhine Province of the Kingdom of Prussia, now part of the Belgian municipality of Kelmis, and grew up in Tilburg in the Netherlands. Since the family was poor, they could not afford a musical education for their son who had to work at a steel mill in Utrecht instead, singing in choirs in his free time. During military service an officer recognised his musical talents and offered to pay for his musical lessons. But since this offer did not include money for food and lodging, the young man could not accept.

Although Cornelie van Zanten is credited in some reference books as being Urlus' teacher, the young tenor was more or less an autodidact when he made his stage début at the Amsterdam opera house on 20 September 1894 as Beppe in Leoncavallo's Pagliacci. He was 27 and a married man. Urlus stayed in Amsterdam for the next few years, gaining further musical training on the job. He appeared as a guest singer in other Dutch cities and built himself a small but growing reputation as a singer, especially in the part of Lohengrin.

In 1898, Urlus was invited to Hanover, where he sang his famous Lohengrin and another Wagner role, that of Tannhäuser. This journey won him an audition with Cosima Wagner, the composer's widow and matriarch of the Bayreuth Festival. But although Urlus had learned all his Wagner roles in German especially for this occasion, he was not invited to sing at the next festival.

Urlus auditioned for the opera company in Frankfurt on his way back to the Netherlands, and was offered a five-year contract there at a generous salary. Although Urlus and his wife had several children already, and needed the money, he turned down the Frankfurt offer because the company would not grant him time off each summer to attend Bayreuth: he still hoped for a call from the festival's directors which, as it transpired, would not be forthcoming for another 13 years.

After returning to the Netherlands, Urlus continued enlarging his repertoire and improving his singing technique until he earned a contract with the Leipzig opera house in Germany in 1900. This company would become his musical home for the next 14 years. In addition, he made a habit of returning to Amsterdam and Antwerp every year to give performances.

During the first decade of the 20th century, Urlus made a series of debuts in different European cities. They included: Berlin (the Berlin State Opera); Prague; Vienna (the Vienna State Opera); Munich (the Bavarian State Opera); Stuttgart; Dresden (the Dresden Opera); Frankfurt; and, lastly, London (the Royal Opera House, Covent Garden, where he sang in 1910 and 1914).

In 1911–12, the Bayreuth Festival's audience finally got to hear him for the first time, as Siegmund in Die Walküre.

In 1912, Urlus made his initial stage appearance in the United States of America. It took place in Boston, where he sang a Tristan in a series of performances opposite the dramatic sopranos Johanna Gadski and Lillian Nordica as Isolde. These performances secured him a contract with the Metropolitan Opera in New York City, where he succeeded the Wagnerian tenors Heinrich Knote and Karel Burian (Carl Burian). Urlus' Met début took place on 8 February 1913. It turned out to be one of the worst personal disasters in Met history. Urlus tried to sing in spite of a heavy head cold and lost his voice completely during the second act of Tristan und Isolde, having to resort to pantomime in act three. Still, when he sang the lead role in Siegfried only a week later he not only restored his reputation completely but cemented his position as the Met's number one (and, later, its sole) heldentenor.

Urlus' Metropolitan Opera career was cut short in 1917 when the United States entered World War I and Wagnerian operas were banned for the duration. That same year, he was elected as an honorary member of Phi Mu Alpha Sinfonia music fraternity at the New England Conservatory of Music.

He joined the Leipzig Opera after his return from the United States, giving occasional concerts in Amsterdam and in Scandinavia as well. From 1922 he sang at the new Wagner Festival at the Zoppoter Waldoper, helping to build its reputation as "Bayreuth of the North". His operatic schedule diminished during the 1920s, however, as he accepted an increasing number of concert engagements. Amsterdam, Rotterdam, Stockholm, Copenhagen and Berlin were all visited by him. When in Berlin, he performed at the Volksoper in 1923–24 and sang again at London's Royal Opera House in 1924.

On 19 November 1931, Urlus delivered his last Tristan in Amsterdam. It was his final operatic performance after more than 1000 nights spanning 37 years. He still appeared occasionally in concerts, however, until 1933.

Urlus died on 6 July 1935 in Noordwijk, Netherlands, while undergoing routine surgery. Upon receiving the news of his demise, the people of the Netherlands greatly lamented his passing, considering him to be a national hero.

== Repertoire, voice and recordings ==
Urlus is best remembered for his Wagnerian performances but he sang many other types of roles. He performed regularly, for example, the Evangelist in Johann Sebastian Bach's St Matthew Passion, always to much acclaim, as well as singing Tamino in Mozart's Die Zauberflöte and Florestan in Beethoven's Fidelio. He appeared, too, in such Verdi parts as Manrico (in Il trovatore), Radames (Aida) and Otello (Otello). He was not a stranger to the French repertoire either, appearing at various times as Samson (in Samson et Dalila), Faust (Faust), Raoul (Les Huguenots) and Don José (Carmen).

In later years Urlus developed a reputation as a specialist in the vocal works of the Austrian composer and conductor Gustav Mahler.

Although powerful, Urlus' voice was not like that of the usual 'monolithic' heldentenor, as epitomised by his mighty successor Lauritz Melchior (1890–1973). It was an elegant, flexible instrument with a lively vibrato and a smooth legato singing style. Urlus' voice also maintained its luminosity throughout a long career, despite the taxing demands placed upon it by the singer. This accounts for Urlus' continued success in a role as lyrical as Tamino.

Today, Urlus is regarded as being one of the very best Wagner singers of all time. He made many acoustic discs of operatic arias and duets, mainly for His Master's Voice and Edison Records, which have been reissued on CD—most notably by Marston Records and the Preiser label. These recordings confirm the outstanding quality of his voice and the excellence and versatility of his musicianship.
