= Lydia Kindermann =

Polish mezzo-soprano opera singer

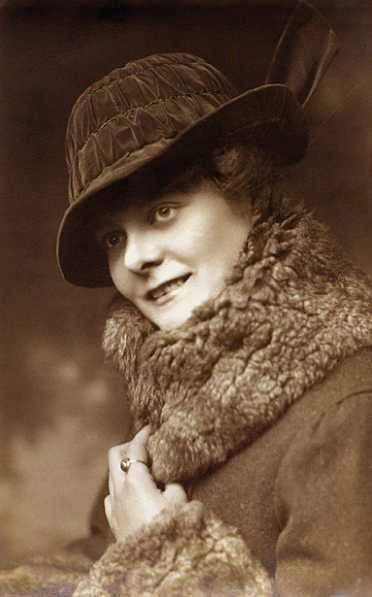
Lidia Kindermann

Lydia Kindermann (1892–1953) was a Polish mezzo-soprano opera singer who from 1917 sang principally in the opera houses of Graz, Stuttgart, Cologne, Berlin and Prague. As a Jew, fearing the rise of Nazism, she emigrated to Argentina in 1938 where she soon became a star of the Teatro Colón in Buenos Aires and acquired Argentine citizenship. She is remembered in particular for her Wagnerian roles, including Ortrud in Lohengrin, Erda and Waltraute in the Ring Cycle and Magdalene in the Meistersinger. In the 1940s, she also performed in Chile and Uruguay. She returned to Austria in 1949 where she appeared in a recital in Innsbrück and taught voice in Vienna.

== Biography ==
Born on 21 September 1892 in Łódź, Russian Empire (now in Poland), Lydia Kindermann was a German speaker of Jewish descent. She made her debut in 1917 at the Stadttheater (city theatre) in Teplitz, Austria-Hungary. From 1917, she performed in Graz, Austria, after which she was engaged by the Stuttgart Opera (1920–26), the Cologne Opera (1926–27) and the Berlin State Opera (1927–31) where she enjoyed particular success. In 1933, she was forced to leave Germany and became attached to the German Theatre in Prague.

Kindermann also gave concerts, frequently performing in Amsterdam's Concertgebouw under Willem Mengelberg, Her earlier performances included appearances in Madrid (1927), Barcelona (1928), Amsterdam (1931) and Paris (1931). In 1927, she appeared in Cologne in the title role of Arthur Honegger's Judith and in 1929 in Berlin in the German premiere of Ruggero Leoncavallo's Il Re. Her repertoire included Amme in Richard Strauss's Die Frau ohne Schatten, Azucena in Verdi's Il trovatore and Marthe in Gounod's Faust.

As a Jew, fearing the rise of Nazism, she emigrated to Argentina in 1938 where she soon became a star of the Teatro Colón in Buenos Aires and acquired Argentine citizenship. She is remembered in particular for her Wagnerian roles, including Ortrud in Lohengrin, Erda and Waltraute in the Ring Cycle and Magdalene in the Meistersinger. In the 1940s, she also performed in Chile and Uruguay. She returned to Austria in 1949 where she appeared in a recital in Innsbrück and taught voice in Vienna.

Lydia Kindermann died in Vienna on 4 December 1953 after suffering from a brain tumor.
