= Maria Müller =

Austrian opera singer

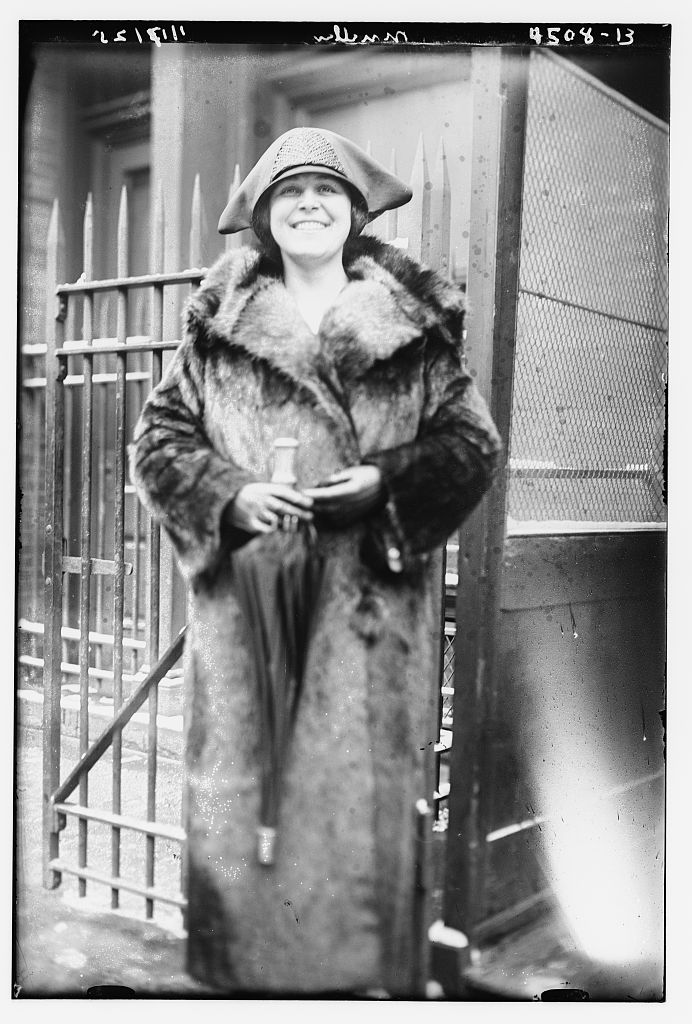
Maria Mueller standing at the stage door of the Metropolitan Opera House, New York City, 1925

Maria Müller (29 January 1889 – 13 March 1958) was a Czech-Austrian operatic lyric/dramatic soprano.

== Life and career ==
Müller was born in Terezín, Bohemia on 29 January 1889. She studied in Prague and in Vienna with Erik Schmedes, and debuted in Linz in 1919 as Elsa in Lohengrin. She also sang at the Neues Deutsches Theater in Prague in 1921-1923 (where she sang the role of Nettchen in the premiere of the revised version of Alexander Zemlinsky's opera Kleider machen Leute) and at the Staatsoper, Munich in 1923-1924. She studied with voice teacher Estelle Liebling, the teacher of Beverly Sills, in New York City after becoming a principal artist at the Metropolitan Opera (the "Met").

On 21 January 1925, Müller made her debut at the "Old Met" as Sieglinde in Die Walküre. The next day, Olin Downes wrote in The New York Times: “young Czech soprano...was warmly welcomed. She has a fresh and youthful voice, a little small for the demands of her role, much grace and sincerity as an actress. Not often is the figure of Sieglinde so human, so tender and so appealing to the beholder." The same year she sang Donna Elvira in Don Giovanni. She sang a total of 196 performances at the Metropolitan Opera between 1925 and 1935. She sang there in a number of American premieres including Franco Alfano's Madonna Imperia (8 February 1928), Pizzetti's Fra Gherardo (29 March 1929), also in the opera Švanda the Bagpiper by the Czech-American composer Jaromír Weinberger (11 July 1931), and Simon Boccanegra (29 January 1932). Concerning Met opening nights, in 1930 she sang the lead in "Aida" and in 1932 she sang Amelia in "Simon Boccanegra".

In 1930-1939, she was a regular Wagnerian singer in Bayreuth. Some of her major roles were Eva in Die Meistersinger von Nürnberg in 1933, plus Sieglinde and Elsa in 1936. The New York Herald Tribune wrote in 1936 from Bayreuth: "Müller's voice is fresher and more beautiful than when she was at the Metropolitan".

At Salzburg, she appeared as Eurydice (1931), Reiza (1933) and Donna Elvira (1934). She made her Covent Garden debut as Eva in 1934, and sang Sieglinde in the 1937 Ring Cycles. Her large repertory included the title roles in Die agyptische Helena, Jenůfa and Gluck’s Iphigénie en Tauride, Djula in Gotovac's Ero the Joker, Pamina, Tosca and Marguerite. Müller possessed a warm, vibrant voice and sang with a rare purity of tone. (Harold Rosenthal)

After World War II she retired to live at Bayreuth, where she died on 13 March 1958.

== Recordings ==
- Tannhauser (1930)
- Die Meistersinger von Nürnberg
- Lohengrin
- Walküre
- Freischütz
- (Lieder) (e.g., Schubert, Brahms, Pfitzner, Wagner)
