= Margarete Teschemacher =

German operatic soprano

Margarete Teschemacher (3 March 1903 – 19 May 1959) was a German operatic soprano, particularly associated with the German repertory, although she sang a wide range of roles. She possessed a warm lyrico-dramatic voice and a good stage presence.

== Life ==
Margarete Teschemacher was born in Cologne in 1903. She studied in Cologne and made her debut there in 1923, as Micaëla in Carmen. She sang at the Theater Aachen (1924–26), Theater Dortmund (1926–28), Mannheim National Theatre (1928–30), Staatsoper Stuttgart (1930–34), Semperoper in Dresden (1934–46) and Opernhaus Düsseldorf (1947-52). She created the title role in Daphne by Richard Strauss, and Miranda in Die Zauberinsel by Heinrich Sutermeister.

In 1931, she appeared at the Royal Opera House in London, as Pamina (The Magic Flute) and Elsa (Lohengrin), and again in 1936 on tour with the Staatsoper Dresden, as Countess Almaviva (The Marriage of Figaro) and Donna Elvira (Don Giovanni). She also appeared at the Teatro Colón in Buenos Aires in 1934, where she sang the title role in Arabella in its premiere in the Americas.

Other notable roles included: Senta (The Flying Dutchman), Eva (Die Meistersinger von Nürnberg), Sieglinde (Die Walküre), Jenůfa, Marenke (The Bartered Bride), Marguerite (Faust), Aida, and Minnie (La fanciulla del West).

She died in Bad Wiessee in 1959, aged 56.

== Sources ==
- Grove Music Online, Harold Rosenthal, Alan Blyth, May 2008.
