= Heinrich Knote =

German opera singer

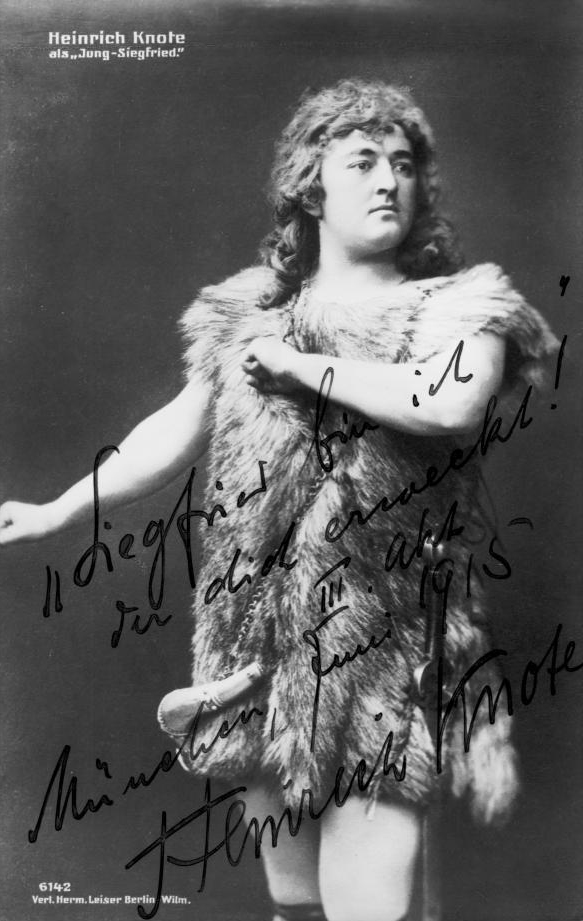
Heinrich Knote as Siegfried

Heinrich Knote (26 November 1870 – 15 January 1953) was an outstanding German dramatic tenor with an international reputation.

Born in Munich, he studied in that Bavarian city with Emmanuel Kirschner before joining the Munich Opera in 1892, debuting in Lortzing's Der Waffenschmied. Munich remained his base for the rest of the 19th century, although he did also appear at other German opera houses during this period.

Gradually Knote's voice, which had begun as a light lyric tenor, grew in size and stamina. By 1900, he was able to undertake Manrico in Verdi's Il trovatore as well as heavy Wagner roles.

The seeds of Knote's international reputation as a top-flight exponent of Wagnerian operatic parts were planted in 1901 when he sang for the first time at the Royal Opera House, Covent Garden. Although his debut season was not an unqualified success, he showed considerable promise, and he was invited back by Covent Garden's management, appearing there again in 1903, 1907–08, and 1913. During these subsequent Covent Garden seasons he sang even more impressively than he had during his first London season, and was now much admired in the Wagnerian roles of Tristan, Siegfried, Tannhauser, Erik, Walther and Lohengrin.

Knote made his American debut at the Metropolitan Opera on 3 December 1904 in Die Meistersinger. He was so successful in this and other Wagner operas that during his three seasons with the Met company, his popularity was said to have almost rivalled that of the Met's superstar tenors Enrico Caruso and, from the previous generation, Jean de Reszke.

Surprisingly enough, Knote never sang at the Bayreuth Festival. (His legato-based method of singing would not have been a good fit in any case with Bayreuth's then favoured sprechgesang style of vocalism.) He did, however, enter into a contract with the artistically esteemed Dresden Opera; but this was cancelled suddenly in 1909 after a dispute with management. Knote spent the First World War period in Germany and became the principal tenor of the Charlottenburg Opera in 1917. After the war, Munich once again became his artistic home although he was engaged for a short time by the Hamburg Opera. He sang in the United States for the last time in 1923-24, appearing as Tristan, Walther and Rienzi with a German opera company.

He retired from the operatic stage in Munich in 1932 and taught singing. At the age of 82, he died in Garmisch-Partenkirchen.

Knote had a handsome stage presence and possessed a strong, smooth, resonant voice with a lively, but rarely intrusive, vibrato. He was additionally praised by music critics of the day for the clarity of his diction. Vocal historians regard him as being one of Germany's best ever Wagnerian tenors.

== Recordings ==
Knote made a large number of recordings of operatic arias from circa 1906 to 1930. Some of these are available on CD transfers.
