= Hilde Konetzni =

Austrian opera singer (1905–1980)

Hilde Konetzni (March 21, 1905 in Vienna – April 20, 1980 in Vienna) was an Austrian operatic soprano, based largely at the Vienna State Opera. She was particularly associated with Wagner roles, especially Sieglinde.

She studied at the Vienna Music Conservatory with Rudolf Nillius, and in Prague with Ludmilla Prohaska-Neumann. She made her debut in Gablonz, as Sieglinde, in 1929, and sang in Prague from 1932 to 1938. In 1936, she made her debut at the Vienna State Opera and the Paris Opéra, as Donna Elvira in Don Giovanni. She appeared at the Royal Opera House in London (1938–39), returning in 1947, and at La Scala in Milan, in 1950, as Sieglinde with Wilhelm Furtwängler.

Other notable roles included; Agathe, Isolde, Brünnhilde, Elisabeth, Marschalin, Leonora, and Chrysothemis.

She was very popular in Vienna, and continued singing small roles until the 1970s. She had a sister, Anny Konetzni (1902–1968), who was also a soprano noted for Richard Wagner and Richard Strauss roles.

== Selected filmography ==
- Viennese Girls (1945)

== Sources ==
- Le guide de l'opéra, R.Mancini & J.J.Rouveroux, (Fayard, 1986), ISBN 2-213-01563-5
