= Elisabeth Schumann =

German soprano (1888–1952)

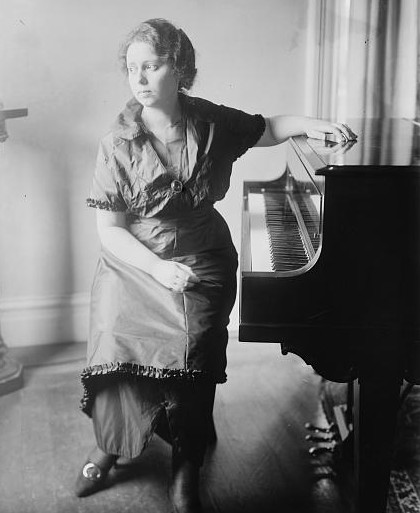
Elisabeth Schumann

Elisabeth Schumann (13 June 1888 – 23 April 1952) was a German lyric soprano who sang in opera, operetta, oratorio, and lieder. She left a substantial legacy of recordings.

== Career ==
Born in Merseburg, Schumann trained for a singing career in Berlin and Dresden. She made her stage debut in Hamburg in 1909. Her initial career started in the lighter soubrette roles that expanded into mostly lyrical roles, some coloratura roles, and even a few dramatic roles. She remained at the Hamburg State Opera until 1919, also singing during the 1914/1915 season at the Metropolitan Opera, New York.

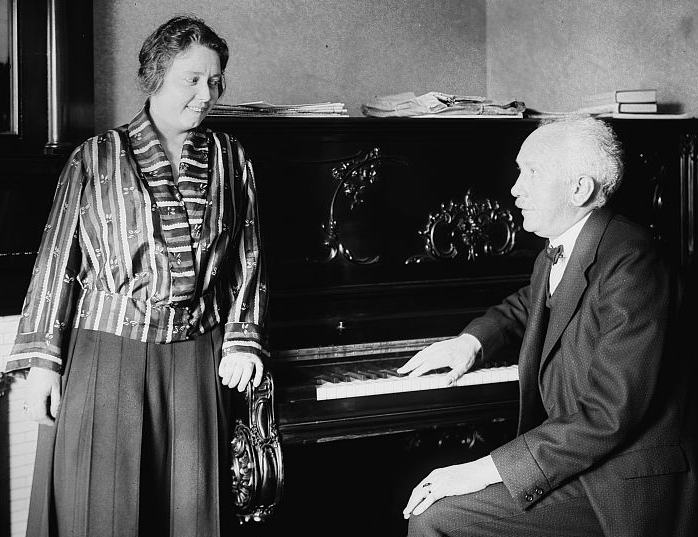
Schumann and Richard Strauss

From 1919 until 1938, she was a star of the Vienna State Opera. Her most famous role was that of Sophie in Richard Strauss's Der Rosenkavalier, but she also excelled in Mozart, taking the roles of Pamina in The Magic Flute, Zerlina in Don Giovanni, Blonde in Die Entführung aus dem Serail and Susanna in The Marriage of Figaro.

The conductor Karl Alwin was her second husband from 1920 until 1938. In 1938, she emigrated to New York City where she lived until her death on 23 April 1952, aged 64. During World War II she gave recitals but mainly taught singing, privately and at the Curtis Institute of Music in Philadelphia. One of her pupils at Curtis was soprano Florence Kirk. After the war she gave many recitals in Europe, making a particularly successful comeback in England.

She was closely connected with Richard Strauss, Otto Klemperer, Lotte Lehmann, Bruno Walter, Wilhelm Furtwängler, and other leading musicians of the first half of the 20th century.

== Death ==
Elisabeth Schumann died in New York City. She was buried in St Martin's Church, Ruislip, England. Her son is also interred in the same plot.

== Honors ==
- Honorary Member of the Vienna State Opera and the first female Honorary Member of the Vienna Philharmonic.

== Opera roles ==
In a career spanning 28 years, Schumann sang 91 roles. Her debut role was the Shepherd Boy in Tannhäuser on 2 September 1909 in Hamburg; on 1 November 1937 her last role was the First Flower maiden in Parsifal in Vienna.

- Abisag, Daniel in der Löwengrube (Joseph Weigl)
- Adele, Die Fledermaus (Johann Strauss II)
- Albertine, Die Brautwahl (Busoni) (role creator)
- Amore, Orfeo ed Euridice (Gluck)
- Anna, L'Africaine (Meyerbeer)
- Ännchen, Der Freischütz (Weber)
- Annina, La traviata (Verdi)
- Antonia, The Tales of Hoffmann (Offenbach)
- Apprentice, Die Meistersinger von Nürnberg (Wagner)
- Arsena, The Gypsy Baron (Johann Strauss II)
- Arsinoe, Die toten Augen (d'Albert)
- Barbarina, The Marriage of Figaro (Mozart)
- Bastienne, Bastien und Bastienne (Mozart)
- Bianca, Der Widerspänstigen Zähmung (Hermann Goetz)
- Blonde, Die Entführung aus dem Serail (Mozart)
- Flower Maiden, Parsifal (Wagner)
- Bronislawa, Der Bettelstudent (Millöcker)
- Cherubino, The Marriage of Figaro (Mozart)
- Chorknabe, Le prophète (Meyerbeer)
- The composer, Ariadne auf Naxos (Richard Strauss)
- Cornelia, Meister Grobian (Arnold Winternitz)
- Cupidon, Orpheus in the Underworld (Offenbach)
- Despina, Così fan tutte (Mozart)
- Dew fairy, Hänsel und Gretel (Humperdinck)
- Dianora, Mona Lisa (Max von Schillings)
- Esquire, Parsifal (Wagner)
- Eva, Die Meistersinger von Nürnberg (Wagner)
- First boy, The Magic Flute (Mozart)
- Forest bird, Siegfried (Wagner)
- Frasquita, Carmen (Bizet)
- Friedensbote, Rienzi (Wagner)
- Gerhilde, Die Walküre (Wagner)
- Goose girl, Königskinder (Humperdinck)
- Gretel, Hänsel und Gretel (Humperdinck)
- Hannerl, Das Dreimäderlhaus (Heinrich Berté)
- Heimchen, The Cricket on the Hearth (Karl Goldmark)
- Ida, Die Fledermaus (Johann Strauss II)
- Ilia, Idomeneo (Mozart)
- Laura, Der Ring des Polykrates (Korngold)
- Lola, Cavalleria rusticana (Mascagni)
- Luise, Ferdinand und Luise (Julius Zaiczek-Blankenau)
- Maid, Martha (Friedrich von Flotow)
- Malgherita, Meister Andrea (Felix Weingartner)
- Mařenka, The Bartered Bride (Smetana)
- Margiana, Der Barbier von Bagdad (Peter Cornelius)
- Marguerite, Faust (Gounod)
- Marie, Zar und Zimmermann (Albert Lortzing)
- Marzellina, Fidelio (Beethoven)
- Micaëla, Carmen (Bizet)
- Mignon, Mignon (Thomas)
- Mimì, La bohème (Puccini)
- Musetta, La bohème (Puccini)
- Najade (Naiad), Ariadne auf Naxos (Richard Strauss)
- Nanette, Der Wildschütz (Lortzing)
- Nannetta, Falstaff (Verdi)
- Nedda, Pagliacci (Leoncavallo)
- Norina, Don Pasquale (Donizetti)
- Nuri, Tiefland (d'Albert)
- Octavian, Der Rosenkavalier (Richard Strauss)
- Page, Lohengrin (Wagner)
- Page, Tannhäuser (Wagner)
- Pamina, The Magic Flute (Mozart)
- Papagena, The Magic Flute (Mozart)
- Pepa, Tiefland (d'Albert)
- Rhinemaiden, Götterdämmerung (Wagner)
- Rose, Lakmé (Delibes)
- Rose, Le postillon de Lonjumeau (Adam)
- Sandman, Hänsel und Gretel (Humperdinck)
- Serpina, La serva padrona (Pergolesi)
- Shepherd boy, Tannhäuser (Wagner)
- Sophie, Der Rosenkavalier (Richard Strauss)
- Susanna, Le nozze di Figaro (Mozart)
- Suschen, Die beiden Schützen (Lortzing)
- Valentin, La chanson de Fortunio (Offenbach)
- Veronika, Die Schneider von Schönau (Jan Brandts Buys)
- Vertraute, Elektra (Richard Strauss)
- Wellgunde, Das Rheingold (Wagner)
- Wellgunde, Götterdämmerung (Wagner)
- Woglinde, Das Rheingold (Wagner)
- Woglinde, Götterdämmerung (Wagner)
- Yvonne, Jonny spielt auf (Krenek)
- Zelmire, Le cadi dupé (Gluck)
- Zerlina, Don Giovanni (Mozart)
- Zerline, Fra Diavolo (Auber)

== Biography ==
- Elisabeth Schumann: a Biography by (her son) Gerd Puritz, edited and translated by her granddaughter, Joy Puritz, published 1993 by André Deutsch, London, ISBN 0-233-98794-0 (out of print); revised paperback edition published 1996 by Grant and Cutler, London, ISBN 9780729303941

== Recordings ==
- Great Voices of the Century sing Exotica, SCSH 005
- "Elisabeth Schumann: Silver thread of song", EMI Classics, 2011, digitally-remastered 6-CD set, 5099991848024.
