= Oh Those Glorious Old Student Days =

Oh Those Glorious Old Student Days (German: O alte Burschenherrlichkeit) may refer to:

- "O alte Burschenherrlichkeit" (song), a popular university song drinking song written in 1825; see Robert Leonhardt
- Oh Those Glorious Old Student Days (1925 film), a German silent film
- Oh Those Glorious Old Student Days (1930 film), a German sound film
