= Robert Leonhardt =

Austrian opera singer

- Also known as: Robert Leonard
- Born: December 27, 1872; Linz, Austria
- Died: February 2, 1923 New York City
- Genres: opera, German folk
- Occupation: singer
- Years active: 1900–1922
- Labels: Gramophone Company, Zonophone, Homokord, Edison, Columbia, Victor
- Formerly of: Enrico Caruso, Metropolitan Opera

Robert Leonhardt (December 27, 1872 – February 2, 1923) was an Austrian operatic baritone who sang several notable roles with the New York Metropolitan Opera between 1913 and 1922. He made numerous recordings for major record labels, both in Europe and in the United States.

== Biography ==
Leonhardt was born in 1872 in Linz. His operatic debut was in 1898, in Linz. For four years he found permanent employment at the German Theatre in Prague starting in 1905.

Specializing in Wagnerian roles, he sang in Brno from 1909 to 1911, and from 1911 until 1913 with the Vienna Volksoper while also guesting with the Vienna Imperial Opera in 1909 and the Berlin Gura Summer Opera in 1910. In October 1913 it was announced that Leonhardt had joined the New York Metropolitan opera.

Sailing from Bremen, he endured a difficult voyage before arriving in the U.S. on November 6. He first appeared on stage for his new employer in December in the role of Peter in Engelbert Humperdinck's opera Hänsel und Gretel. Receiving critical acclaim for his work in this role, he would appear in Met productions over the course of the next nine years.

He was expected to appear in an expanded role at the met, but world circumstances would prevent this. Beginning in December 1917 he billed himself as "Robert Leonard" to distance himself from his Germanic heritage. Nevertheless, Leonhardt, a citizen of Austria, was dropped by the New York Met in April 1918 because of his status as an enemy alien despite continued critical praise. The opera's manager, Mr. Gatti, expressed his regret at having to make such a move. Leonhardt's wife and children resided in Vienna for the duration of the war.

After the war his employment recommenced with the Met and he was performing on stage again as of November 1920. Here he continued to perform until shortly before his death. He developed an illness from which he never recovered and died at St. Mark's Hospital in New York City on February 2, 1923.

== Performance style ==
Reviews of Leonhardt's performances are wide-ranging. He has been noted for a "dark, steely, throaty bass" with mundane performance, although this is perhaps due to Leonhardt being out of his voice's comfort zone regarding range. Conversely, he was noted for having a "luscious and lovely Italian voice" with a splendid, spontaneous sense of humor.

== Operatic roles ==
=== United States ===
Year	Company	Opera	Role	Notes
1910	Gura Summer Opera	Die Meistersinger Von Nürnberg	Beckmesser	
1910	Gura Summer Opera	Der Ring des Nibelungen	Alberich	
1913	New York Met	Hänsel und Gretel	Peter	debut with the New York Met
1914	Boston Opera Company	Die Meistersinger Von Nürnberg	Beckmesser	
1914	New York Met	Königskinder	Innkeeper	
1914	New York Met	Die Meistersinger von Nürnberg	Nachtigall	
1914	New York Met	Der Rosenkavalier	Faninal	
1914	New York Met	L'Amore Medico	Macroton	U.S. Premier
1914	New York Met	Die Zauberflöte	Papageno	
1914	New York Met	La Bohème	Benoit	
1914	New York Met	Tosca	Sacristan	
1915	New York Met	Carmen	Dancaïre	
1915	New York Met	Madame Sans-Gêne	Leroy	World Premiere
1915	New York Met	Fidelio	Second Prisoner	
1915	New York Met	Siegfried	Alberich	
1915	New York Met	La Bohème	Alcindoro	
1915	New York Met	Manon	Innkeeper	
1916	New York Met	The Taming of the Shrew	Hortensio	
1916	New York Met	Iphigénie en Tauride	Temple Attendant	U.S. Premiere
1916	New York Met	Lohengrin	Herald	
1917	New York Met	Le Nozze di Figaro	Antonio	
1917	New York Met	The Canterbury Pilgrims	The Knight, Man of Law	World Premiere
1917	New York Met	Tristan und Isolde	Melot	
1917	New York Met	Mârouf	Ahmad (Pastry Cook)	U.S. Premiere
1918	New York Met	Saint Elisabeth (Liszt)	Steward	
1918	New York Met	Le Prophète	Anabaptist	
1920	New York Met	La Juive	Ruggiero	
1920	New York Met	Parsifal	Amfortas	
1921	New York Met	Louise	Philosopher	
1921	New York Met	Andrea Chénier	Fouquier Tinville	
1921	New York Met	The Polish Jew	Judge Schmitt	U.S. Premiere
1921	New York Met	Die tote Stadt	Frank	U.S. Premiere
1922	New York Met	Le roi d'Ys	St. Corentin	
1922	New York Met	Boris Godunov	Shchelkalov	

== Recordings ==
Leonhardt's career are a recording artist may be more important than his performing career. He recorded many popular songs, as well as operatic arias. His recording career began in 1900 for the Gramophone Company, recording prolifically for them through 1905. Many of these recordings were issued in the Standard German Catalogue. Several European recordings also appeared on the International Zonophone and Homokord labels. From 1903 to 1905 he also made records for the European Columbia branch. He recorded cylinders for the Edison company before coming to the United States, and these were marketed in the U.S. to the German-speaking population. After changing his residency to the United States, he continued his recording career with Columbia Records from 1915 through 1920. Although promoted as from the "Metropolitan Opeara Co.", not all of his recordings were operatic and like the Edison cylinders, his records were marketed to German-speaking Americans, in their E-prefix ethnic catalog, and not to the general public. An exception is Record #A2053, to which the prestigious tri-color banner label was applied. This record was released in 1916, and an announcement was made in the English-speaking trade press, but no other records by Leonhardt appeared in this series. His final recordings were made for Victor in 1921 and 1922, also released in their ethnic series. Collectors of operatic recordings were instructed to seek out these ethnic selections of Leonhardt's.

=== Discography ===
(incomplete)

Note: All Columbia listings are U.S. releases.

Label	Catalog #	Title	Format	Year	Notes
Gramophone	42609	Stell' auf den Tisch	78 rpm	1900	
Gramophone	42322	Carmen: Toreador (Georges Bizet)	78 rpm	February 1900	matrix 641A
Gramophone	42349	Bonn (August Bungert)	78 rpm	1901	
Gramophone	42461	Dem Buren die Ehre, oder Das verlorene Glück des Buren	78 rpm	1901	matrix 648A
Gramophone	42319	Zwei Äuglein braun (Ferdinand Gumbert)	78 rpm	October 1901	matrix 1102B
Gramophone	42320	Deine blauen Augen (Kötzschke)	78 rpm	October 1901	matrix 1112B
Gramophone	42325	Zwei dunkle Augen (Carl Heins)	78 rpm	October 1901	matrix 1113B
Gramophone	42326	Leicht' Gepäck (Hämmerlein)	78 rpm	October 1901	matrix 1114B
Gramophone	42322	Ach, könnt' ich noch einmal so lieben (Wilhelm Aletter)	78 rpm	October 1901	matrix 1115B
Gramophone	42324	Das Herz am Rhein - Es liegt eine Krone im tiefen Rhein (Wilhelm Hill)	78 rpm	October 1901	matrix 1146B
Gramophone	42473	Li-ti-ti, Rheinländer	78 rpm	October 1901	matrix 1302B
Gramophone	42383	Morgenhymne (George Henschel)	78 rpm	October 1901	matrix 119x
Gramophone	42380	Ach, könnt' ich noch einmal so lieben (Wilhelm Aletter)	78 rpm	October 1901	matrix 120x
Gramophone	42404	Bruder Liederlich (Blasser)	78 rpm	October 1901	matrix 185x
Gramophone	42407	Zwei dunkle Augen (Carl Heins)	78 rpm	October 1901	matrix 199x
Gramophone	44029	Die Haselnuss, Überbrettlgesang	78 rpm	October 1901	duet with Gertrud Runge
Gramophone	42327	Schneeglöckchen	78 rpm	1902	matrix 1162B
Gramophone	42664	Lehn' deine Wang' an meine Wang' (Jensen)	78 rpm	1902	matrix 2113B
Gramophone	42675	Steh' ich in finstrer Mitternacht, Volkslied	78 rpm	1902	matrix 2187B
Gramophone	42682	Ach, wie wär's möglich dann (Kücken)	78 rpm	1902	matrix 2188B
Gramophone	42684	Deutschland über alles (Haydn - August Heinrich Hoffmann von Fallersleben)	78 rpm	1902	matrix 2190B
Gramophone	42685	Muss i' denn zum Städtle hinaus, Volkslied	78 rpm	1902	matrix 2192B
Gramophone	42073	Es zogen drei Burschen, Volkslied	78 rpm	1902	matrix 2893B
Gramophone	42943	Freiheit, die ich meine (Karl Groos)	78 rpm	1902	matrix 1278x
Gramophone	42945	Wem Gott will rechte Gunst erweisen (Mathias Fröhlich)	78 rpm	1902	matrix 1280x
Gramophone	42982	Carmen: Torerolied (Bizet)	78 rpm	1902	matrix 1307x
Gramophone	42950	Die Schöne von New York: Du mein Girl (Gustave Kerker)	78 rpm	1902	matrix 1313x
Gramophone	42986	Waldandacht (Franz Wilhelm Abt)	78 rpm	1902	matrix 1371x
Gramophone	42980	Ich sieh einem jungen Mann	78 rpm	1902	matrix 1286x
Gramophone	42949	Das Grab auf der Haide (Heiser)	78 rpm	1902	matrix 1312x
Gramophone	2-42652	Aennchen im Garten (Hoelzel)	78 rpm	1903	matrix 1749x
Gramophone	2-42655	Ich sende diese Blumen dir (Gallrein)	78 rpm	1903	matrix 1768x
Gramophone	2-42656	Wenn die Schwalben heimwärts zieh'n	78 rpm	1903	matrix 1769x
Gramophone	2-42637	Die Puppe: Lied von der Zufriedenheit - Fragt jemand (Edmond Audran)	78 rpm	1903	matrix 1770x
Gramophone	2-42657	Morgens send' ich dir die Veilchen	78 rpm	1903	matrix 1784x
Gramophone	2-42658	Die Puppe: Lied des Maximus (Edmond Audran)	78 rpm	1903	matrix 1785x
Gramophone	2-42114	Lauf der Welt (Goldschmidt)	78 rpm	1903	matrix 3181B
Gramophone	3-42094	Ach, wie ist's möglich dann	78 rpm	1904	matrix 2475L
Gramophone	2-42247	Das Vergissmeinnicht	78 rpm	1904	matrix 1901k
Gramophone	44436	Das ist der Tag des Herrn (Conradin Kreutzer)	78 rpm	1904	duet with Gertrud Runge; matrix 2326h
Gramophone	3-42057	Zampa: Reizendes Mädchen (Ferdinand Hérold)	78 rpm	1904	matrix 2382L
Gramophone	3-42054	Das Vergissmeinnicht	78 rpm	1904	matrix 2404L
Gramophone	3-42093	Morgenrot, Morgenrot, Volkslied	78 rpm	1904	matrix 2478L
Gramophone	2-42252	Muss i' denn zum Städtle hinaus, Volkslied	78 rpm	1904	matrix 1916k
Gramophone	3-42065	Muss i' denn zum Städtle hinaus, Volkslied	78 rpm	1904	matrix 2407L
Gramophone	3-42422	Zu Mantua in Banden (Leopold Knebelsberger)	78 rpm	1905	matrix 234r
Gramophone	3-42335	Waldandacht (Franz Wilhelm Abt)	78 rpm	1905	matrix 236r
Gramophone	3-42310	Im Krug zum grünen Kranze, Volkslied	78 rpm	1905	matrix 238r
Gramophone	3-42311	O alte Burschenherrlichkeit, Studentenlied	78 rpm	1905	matrix 239r
Gramophone	3-42312	Franz Wilhelm Abt)	78 rpm	1905	matrix 240r
Gramophone	2-42320	Zwei dunkle Augen (Carl Heins)	78 rpm	1905	matrix 256q
Gramophone	2-42327	Die Schöne von New York: Du mein Girl (Gustave Kerker)	78 rpm	1905	matrix 257q
Gramophone	2-42322	Wem Gott will rechte Gunst erweisen (Mathias Fröhlich)	78 rpm	1905	matrix 260q
Gramophone	2-42323	O alte Burschenherrlichkeit, Studentenlied	78 rpm	1905	matrix 262q
Gramophone	3-42309	Zwei dunkle Augen (Carl Heins)	78 rpm	1905	matrix 5h
Gramophone	3-42093X	Morgenrot, Morgenrot, Volkslied	78 rpm	1905	matrix 17h
Gramophone	3-42199	Tief im Böhmerwald, Volkslied (Hans Bichert)	78 rpm	1905	matrix 3066L
Gramophone	3-42169	Der rote Sarafan, russische Volkslied	78 rpm	-	matrix 2662L
Gramophone	2-42231	Zampa: Reizendes Mädchen (Ferdinand Hérold)	78 rpm	-	matrix 1902k
Victor	61151	Die Musik kommt	78 rpm	-	
Homokord	1135	Die Loreley	10" 78 rpm	-	(backed with #1212)
Homokord	1212	Vom Rhein der Wein	10" 78 rpm	-	(backed with #1135)
Homokord	D238	Wenn du noch eine Mutter hast	10" 78 rpm	-	(reverse side by Rodulf Wang)
Homokord	D240	Ach, ich hab sie ja nur auf die Schulter geküsst (C. Millöcker)	10" 78 rpm	-	-
Homokord	D240	Ich weiss ein Herz, für das ich bete	10" 78 rpm	-	-
Pathé	1056	Nun ist's vollbracht (Lortzing)	10.5" vertical-cut 78 rpm	-	(reverse side by Peter Lordmann)
Edison	12236	Die Zauberflöte: Der Vogelfänger bin ich ja	2-minute cylinder	-	
Edison	12262	Zwei dunkle Augen	2-minute cylinder	1907	
Edison	12264	Aria (Pardon de Ploërmel: Ah! mon remords te venge)	2-minute cylinder	1907	
Edison	15189	Edelweiss	2-minute cylinder	1908	
Edison	15197	Stolzenfels am Rhein (J. Meissler)	2-minute cylinder	-	
Edison	15198	Ich sende diese Blume dir (Wagner)	2-minute cylinder	-	
Edison	15254	Muss I Denn Zum Staedtele Hinaus	2-minute cylinder	-	-
Edison	15302	Wie schön leuchtet der Morgenstern (Philipp Nicolai)	2-minute cylinder		
Edison	15334	Tief Im Böhmerwald	2-minute cylinder	-	
Edison	16090	Ballad of Nelusko (L'Africaine: Adamastor, roi des vagues profondes)	2-minute cylinder	~1909	
Columbia	40510	Tannhäuser: O du mein holder Abendstern	10" single-sided 78 rpm	-	-
Columbia	40515	An der Weser Pressl	single-sided 78 rpm	-	-
Columbia	E2565	Die Musik kimmt (Oskar Strauss)	10" 78 rpm	October 29, 1915	matrix 46163 take 2
Columbia	E2565	Prinz Eugen, der edle Ritter (Carl Löwe)	10" 78 rpm	October 29, 1915	matrix 46164 take 1
Columbia	E2566	Das goldene Kreuz - Lied des Bombardon	10" 78 rpm	October 29, 1915	matrix 46165 take 1
Columbia	E2566	Bonn (Wen nur der Rhein nicht wär'...)	10" 78 rpm	October 29, 1915	matrix 46166 take 1
Columbia	E2644	Heimweh (Hugo Wolf)	10" 78 rpm	November 1, 1915	matrix 46169 take 1
Columbia	E2644	Nachtigallenlied, from "Der Vogelhändler" (Zeller)	10" 78 rpm	November 1, 1915	matrix 46170 take 1
Columbia	A2053	Der Trompeter von Säkkingen: Es hat nicht sollen sein	10" 78 rpm	~April 1916	matrix 43921 take 1
Columbia	A2053	O schöne Zeit, o sel'ge Zeit (Götze)	10" 78 rpm	~April 1916	matrix 43922 take 1
Columbia	E2951	Andreas Hofer	10" 78 rpm	~April 1916	matrix 43923
Columbia	E2951	Gott erhalte (Austrian folk hymn)	10" 78 rpm	~April 1916	matrix 43924
Columbia	E3098	Die Schlesischen Zecher und die Teufel (Reissiger)	10" 78 rpm	~May 1916	matrix 43975 take 2
Columbia	E3098	Drei Wanderer	10" 78 rpm	~May 1916	matrix 43978 take 1
Columbia	E3140	Aus der Jugendzeit (Radecke)	10" 78 rpm	~May 1916	matrix 44070 take 1
Columbia	E3230	Vom Rhein beim Wein	10" 78 rpm	1916	
Columbia	E3230	Still wie die Nacht, tief wie das Meer	10" 78 rpm	1916	duet with Julia Kuebler
Columbia	E3273	Sechse, sieben oder acht (Herrmann)	10" 78 rpm	~May 1916	matrix 44069 take 1
Columbia	E3273	Loblied der Polin, from "Der Bettelstudent" (Millöcker)	10" 78 rpm	~May 1916	matrix 44071 take 2
Columbia	E3320	Küssen ist keine Sünd	10" 78 rpm	-	44033 take 1 (duet with Elinor Navarry)
Columbia	E3320	Sei nicht böse	10" 78 rpm	-	44032 take 2 (duet with Elinor Navarry)
Columbia	E4898	Wohlauf noch getrunken - Wanderlied	10" 78 rpm	October 1920	matrix 86736 take 1
Columbia	E4898	Loreley	10" 78 rpm	October 1920	matrix 86737 take 2
Columbia	E4935	Aus der Jugendzeit	10" 78 rpm	October 1920	matrix 86739 take 1
Columbia	E4935	Wenn die Schwalben wiederkehr'n	10" 78 rpm	December 1920	matrix 86891 take 2
Columbia	E4956	Die Beiden Grenadiere	10" 78 rpm	December 1920	matrix 86874 take 1
Columbia	E4956	Prinz Eugen der Ritter	10" 78 rpm	December 1920	matrix 86889 take 3
Columbia	E4997	Reiters Morgenlied	10" 78 rpm	October 1920	matrix 86738
Columbia	E4997	Andreas Hofer	10" 78 rpm	December 1920	matrix 86875
Columbia	E7073	Der Trompeter von Säkkingen:Behüt' dich Gott	10" 78 rpm	December 1920	matrix 86890 take 1
Columbia	E7073	Nachtigall Lied	10" 78 rpm	December 1920	matrix 86896 take 2
Columbia	E7489	Der letzte Gruss	10" 78 rpm	December 1920	matrix 86873
Columbia	E7489	Einst spielt' ich mit Szepter, from "Zar und Zimmermann"	10" 78 rpm	December 1920	matrix 86897
Victor	68583	Der Trompeter von Säkkingen: Behüt' dich Gott, es wär' zu schön gewesen	12" 78 rpm	December 27, 1921	Nathaniel Shilkret, conductor
Victor	68583	Erlkönig	12" 78 rpm	December 27, 1921	Nathaniel Shilkret, conductor
Victor	73258	Im Prater blüh 'n wieder die Bäume (Kurt Robitschek - Robert Stolz)	10" 78 rpm	February 21, 1922	matrix B 26208 take 2
Victor	73258	Weisst du, Muatterl, was I träumt hab? (A. Kutschera)	10" 78 rpm	February 21, 1922	matrix B 26208 take 2
