= L'amore medico =

Opera by Ermanno Wolf-Ferrari

- Opera by Ermanno Wolf-Ferrari
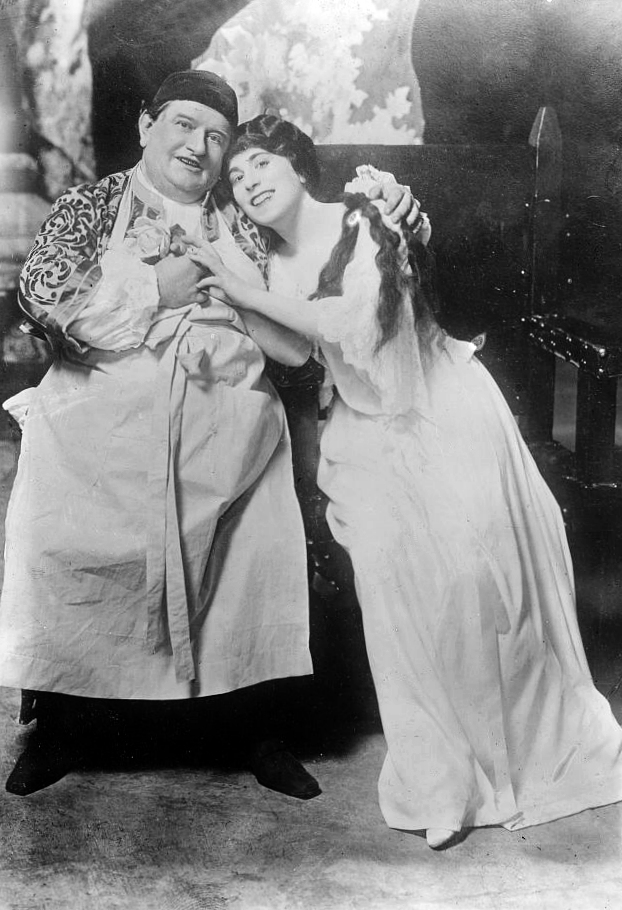
- A scene with Antonio Pini-Corsi and Lucrezia Bori, 1914
- Translation: Doctor Cupid
- Librettist: Enrico Golisciani
- Language: Italian
- Based on: L'Amour médecin by Molière
- Premiere: 4 December 1913 (in German); Hoftheater, Dresden

L'amore medico (Doctor Cupid, also known as The Love Doctor) is an opera in two acts by composer Ermanno Wolf-Ferrari. Based on Molière's comedy L'Amour médecin, the work uses an Italian libretto by Enrico Golisciani. It premiered in a German version by Richard Batka on 4 December 1913 at the Hoftheater in Dresden under the title Der Liebhaber als Arzt.

The opera's United States premiere took place on 25 March 1914 at the Metropolitan Opera in New York City, conducted by Arturo Toscanini. It was first performed in Italy on 6 March 1929 at the Teatro Regio (Turin), conducted by Franco Capuana.

== Roles ==
Roles, voice types, premiere cast
Role	Voice type	Premiere cast 4 December 1913	USA premiere cast, 25 March 1914 Conductor: Arturo Toscanini
Lucinda, Arnolfo's daughter	soprano		Lucrezia Bori
Clitandro, Lucinda's admirer	tenor		Italo Cristalli
Lisetta, a servant	soprano		Bella Alten
Arnolfo	baritone		Antonio Pini-Corsi
Tomes, a doctor	bass		Léon Rothier
Desfonandres, a doctor	bass		Andrés de Segurola
Macroton, a doctor	baritone		Robert Leonhardt
Bahis, a doctor	tenor		Angelo Badà
Notary	bass		Paolo Ananian

== Recordings ==
- Doctor Cupid (L'amore medico): Punch Opera
  - Music conducted by Rex Wilder
  - Directed by Nelson Sykes
  - Pianists: Robert Boberg and Barbara Ylvisaker
  - Sung in English by: Anita Beltram (Lucinda), John Miller (Clitandro), Martha Moore Sykes (Lisetta), Milton Gorman (Papa), Richard Roussin (Doctor Tomes); Bettie Harris Fox (Astrologer); Rex Coston (Magician); Margaret Fittz (Gypsy)
  - Recording date: 1952
  - Label: Abbey Records, LP No. 5
- Wolf-Ferrari: Orchestral Works, BBC Philharmonic
  - Conductor: Gianandrea Noseda
  - Recording date: 2009
  - Label: Chandos, 10511 (CD)
