= Marie Mattfeld =

German opera singer (1870–1927)

Marie Mattfeld (1870 – 18 September 1927) was a German opera singer who performed repertoire from the mezzo-soprano and soprano canon of performance literature during the last decade of the 19th century and the first three decades of the 20th century. Beginning her career performing in concerts and operas in Munich in the early 1890s, she joined Walter Damrosch's newly created American opera company in 1896. After performing for several years in operas in the United States, she returned to Germany where she was committed to Theater Bremen from 1901 to 1905. In 1906 she returned to the United States to join the roster of resident artists at the Metropolitan Opera ("The Met"); having previously made her debut with that company in 1901. She remained committed to the Met up until her death in 1927; giving a total of 900 performances in more than forty different operas. She was particularly admired for her portrayal of Hänsel in Engelbert Humperdinck's Hansel and Gretel.

Mattfeld is best remembered for creating roles in the world premieres of several operas at the Met; including Humperdinck's Königskinder (1910), Giacomo Puccini's La fanciulla del West (1910), Damrosch's Cyrano (1913), and Puccini's Suor Angelica (1918). Her voice is preserved on two recordings made with the Victor Talking Machine Company.

== Early life, education and initial career in Germany ==
Born Marie Schmid in Munich, Germany in 1870, Marie Mattfeld was the daughter of Herman Schmid and Mary Schmid (née Friedl). Her father worked as a musician at the Bavarian court. Her uncle, Franz Joseph Schmid, was a composer, conductor, and organist who directed the United Singing Societies of Germany.

Mattfeld married the German-American organist, pianist, composer, and music educator Wilhelm Mattfeld (1863-1925) in Munich in July 1890, and performed under her married name. She was trained as a vocalist at the Munich Conservatory (now the University of Music and Performing Arts Munich), and also studied piano at that institution with Ludwig Thuille. She began her career performing as an opera and concert singer in Munich in the early 1890s.

== Later career in the United States and Germany ==
Mattfeld left Germany when she was engaged by Walter Damrosch for his newly created opera company. She made her American debut with that company on 9 March 1896 at the Academy of Music (New York City) as the Shepherd boy in Richard Wagner's Tannhäuser with Riza Eibenschütz as Venus, Milka Ternina as Elizabeth, and Max Alvary in the title role. She remained with that company for three seasons, where her repertoire included the role of the Rhinemaidens Wellgunde in both Götterdämmerung (1896 and 1897) and Das Rheingold (1897) among other parts.

In 1899 Mattfeld joined Henry Wilson Savage's Boston based Castle Square Opera Company with whom she performed in both Massachusetts and New York. She appeared with that organization at T. Henry French's The American Theatre in New York City in 1899 as Magdalena in Wagner's Die Meistersinger von Nürnberg; a role she later repeated with the company at the 1899 Worcester Music Festival, Massachusetts. In 1900 she was engaged by Marcella Sembrich's touring Sembrich Opera Company for performances of the roles of Siebel in Faust, Alisa in Lucia di Lammermoor, and Bertha in The Barber of Seville. In April 1901 she made her debut at the Metropolitan Opera ("the Met") in New York as the Valkyrie Siegrune in Die Walküre.

Mattfield returned to Germany, and was a resident artist at Theater Bremen from 1901 to 1905. There she performed roles in the soubrette repertoire. She then returned to New York in 1906 to join the roster of principal artist at the Met where she was initially under contract as a soprano. She made her first return appearance at that house in 1906 as Hänsel in Engelbert Humperdinck's Hansel and Gretel. It was this role for which she was most closely associated during her career. She remained committed to the Met up until her death 21 years later, giving a total of 900 performances at the Metropolitan Opera House during her tenure with the company. Highlights of her career at the Met included creating roles in the world premieres of four operas: Engelbert Humperdinck's Königskinder (1910, as the Stable girl), Giacomo Puccini's La fanciulla del West (1910, as Wowkle), Walter Damrosch's Cyrano (1913, as Duenna) and Puccini's Suor Angelica (1918, as Sister Dolcina). She also performed in the United States premieres of several operas at the Met, including Ludwig Thuille's Lobetanz in 1911; Leo Blech's Versiegelt in 1912 in the role of Willmers; Gustave Charpentier's Julien in 1914; Xavier Leroux's La reine Fiammette in 1919 in the role of Chiarina; and Leoš Janáček's Jenůfa in the role of the aunt.

Most of Mattfield's other roles at the Met were smaller comprimario parts, although she did occasionally get larger parts in addition to Hansel such as Lady Harriet in Martha, Ludmila in The Bartered Bride, Mamma Lucia in Cavalleria rusticana, Marcellina in The Marriage of Figaro, the Marquise of Berkenfield in La fille du régiment, Musetta in La bohème, Suzuki in Madama Butterfly, and Teresa in La sonnambula. Other roles Mattfield performed on the Met stage included Alisa in Lucia di Lammermoor, Altichiara in Francesca da Rimini, Annina in Der Rosenkavalier, Antonia in Tiefland, Berta in The Barber of Seville, Browe in Zar und Zimmermann, Curra in La forza del destino, Dimitri in Fedora, a Flower Maiden in Parsifal, Frasquita in Carmen, Gertrude in Roméo et Juliette, Giannetta in L'elisir d'amore, Giovanna in Rigoletto, the Governess in The Queen of Spades, both Hedvige and Lene in Germania, the Housekeeper in Der Widerspänstigen Zähmung, Hua-Qui in L'Oracolo, Ines in Il trovatore, the Innkeeper in Boris Godunov, Jouvenot in Adriana Lecouvreur, the Lady of Honor in Les Huguenots, La Rossa in Madame Sans-Gêne, Marthe in Faust, Rose in Lakmé, Rosette in Manon, the slave in Salome, the Solo Madrigalist in Manon Lescaut, Wellgunde in Götterdämmerung, and the Young Woman in L'amore dei tre re. She gave her last appearance at the Met as Annina in Giuseppe Verdi's La traviata on 4 March 1927.

During her career, Mattfeld made two recording with the Victor Talking Machine Company. These consisted of recorded excerpts of the roles of Pamina in The Magic Flute and Magdalena in Die Meistersinger von Nürnberg.

== Personal life and death ==
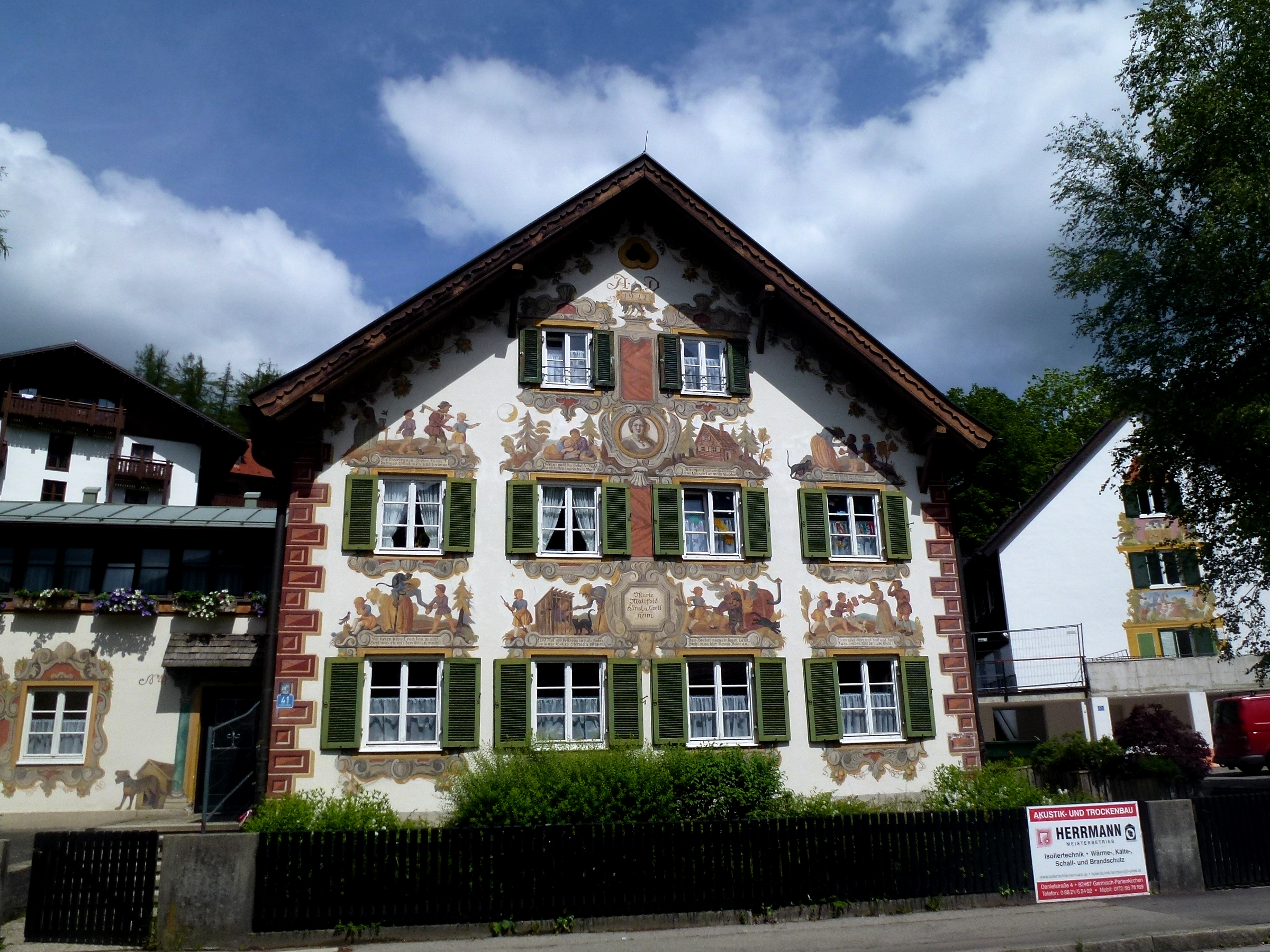
The Marie Mattfeld House in Oberammergau, Germany where Mattfeld established a home for orphan children in 1923.

In New York, Marie Mattfeld lived with her husband, Wilhelm Mattfeld, at 324 W. 51st St in Manhattan. Her husband was born in New York City to German parents, and like his wife, was trained as a musician in Munich where he was a pupil of Josef Rheinberger who trained him as an organist. He met and married his wife while in Munich in July 1890. When the couple moved to New York, he worked as a music teacher and chairman of the department of music at Washington Irving High School in New York City. He was also a composer who wrote several Catholic masses and songs for use in music education programs. He co-authored The American songbook : for the use of schools, academies, and teachers' institutes, and the family circle (1898, King-Richardson Publishing Company) with the educator and historian John Henry Haaren. In addition to his work as a teacher, he also worked as an organist at a variety of churches in Manhattan and Brooklynn during his career, and occasionally served as his wife's accompanist in concert and recitals. Wilhelm Mattfeld died in 1925.

Marie Mattfield died on 18 September 1927 while on vacation in Nauheim, Germany. Four years prior to her death she purchased a home in Oberammergau in which she established a charitable home for orphaned children through donated funds given by the citizens of New York City.
