= Le donne curiose =

Opera by Ermanno Wolf-Ferrari

- Opera by Ermanno Wolf-Ferrari
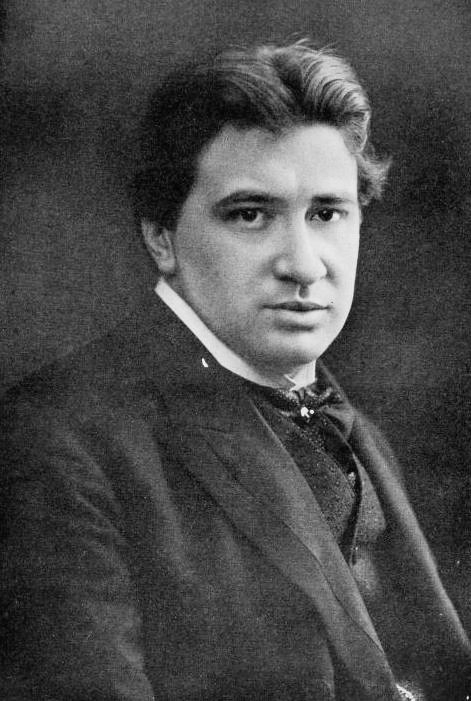
- The composer in 1906
- Translation: The Inquisitive Women
- Librettist: Luigi Sugana
- Language: Italian
- Based on: Le donne curiose by Carlo Goldoni
- Premiere: 27 November 1903 (in German); Hoftheater, Munich

Le donne curiose (English: The Inquisitive Women) is an opera in three acts by Ermanno Wolf-Ferrari to a text by Luigi Sugana after Carlo Goldoni's play of the same name.

== Performance history ==
The first dramatic work by Wolf-Ferrari to achieve more than local notice, it was first performed in Munich on 27 November 1903 in a German translation as Die neugierigen Frauen. The first performance in Italian was at the old Metropolitan Opera House in New York on 3 January 1912 with a cast led by Arturo Toscanini, including Geraldine Farrar and Hermann Jadlowker. Tullio Serafin conducted the first performance in Milan on 16 January 1913.

== Roles ==
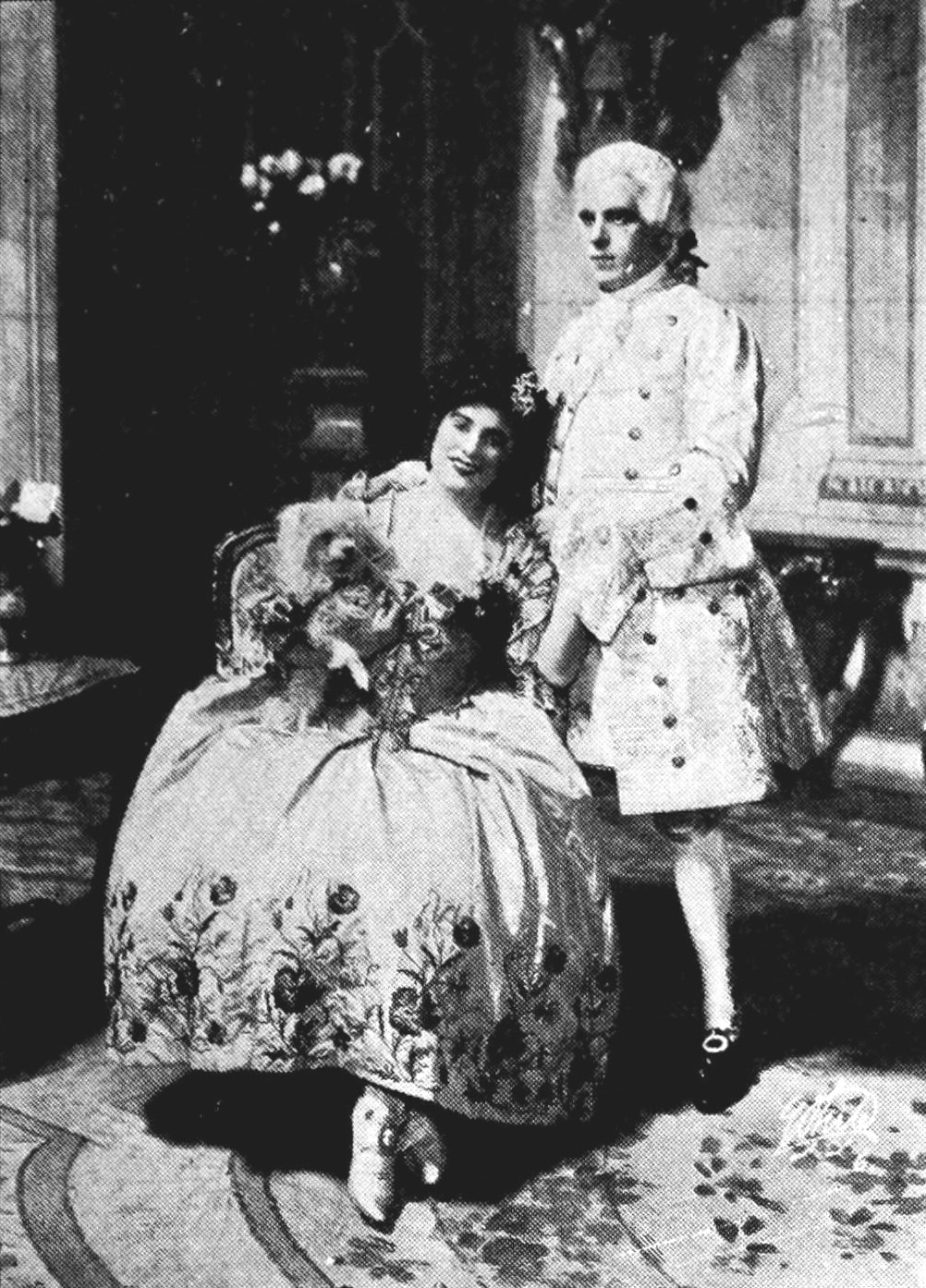
Geraldine Farrar and Hermann Jadlowker as Rosaura and Florindo

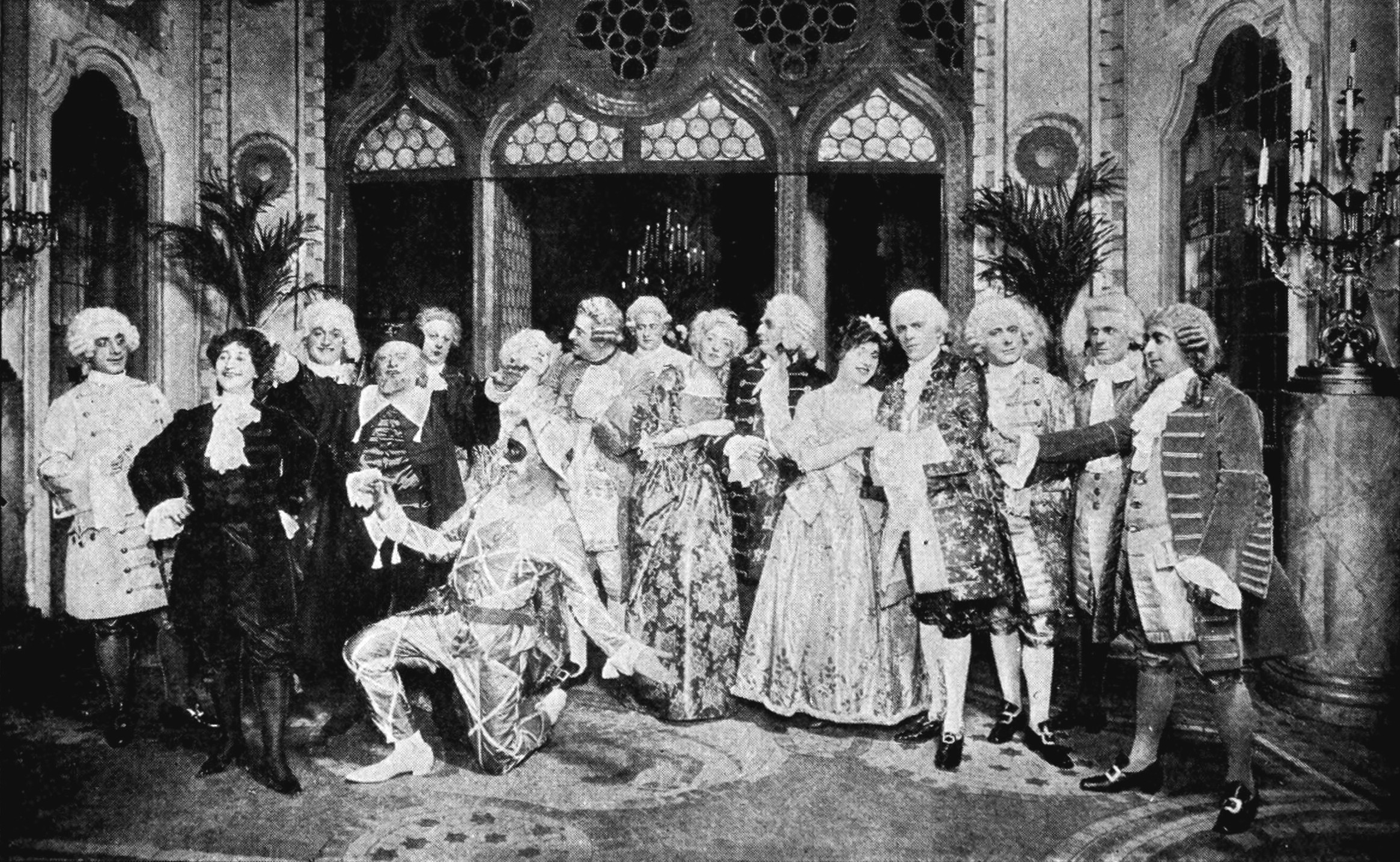
Scene from act 3

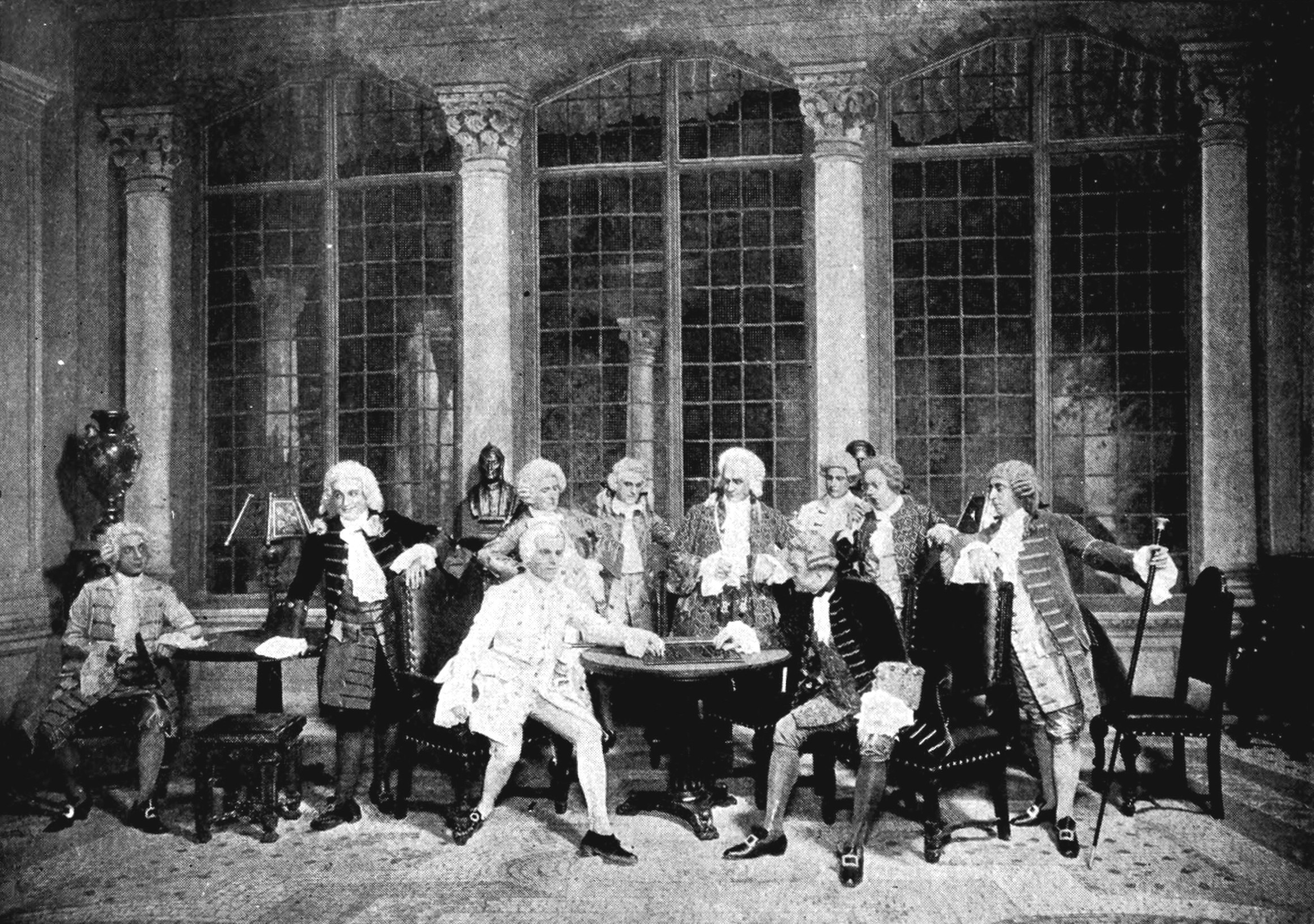
The men at their club, act 1

Roles, voice types, premiere casts
| Role | Voice type | Premiere cast, 27 November 1903 Conductor: Hugo Reichenberger | First performance in Italian, 3 January 1912 Conductor: Arturo Toscanini |
|---|---|---|---|
| Arlecchino | bass | Georg Sieglitz | Antonio Scotti |
| Beatrice | mezzo-soprano | Charlotte Huhn | Rita Fornia |
| Colombina | soprano | Hermine Bosetti | Geraldine Farrar |
| Florindo | tenor | Hans Koppe | Hermann Jadlowker |
| Leandro | tenor | Hans Breuer | Jeanne Maubourg |
| Lelio | baritone | | Andres de Segurola |
| Ottavio | bass | Paul Bender | Adam Didur |
| Pantalone | baritone | Friedrich Brodersen | Antonio Pini-Corsi |
| Rosaura | soprano | Ella Tordek | Bella Alten |
| Lunardo | bass | | |
| Mènego | bass | | |
| Mómolo | bass | | |
| Eleonora | soprano | | |
| Asdrubale | tenor | | |
| Almorò | tenor | | |
| Alvise | tenor | | |
| First gondolier | tenor | | |
| Second gondolier | bass | | |

== Synopsis ==
The story is a comedy set in 18th-century Venice about two wives checking up on the goings-on at their husband's club.
