= Vera Curtis =

American soprano and voice teacher

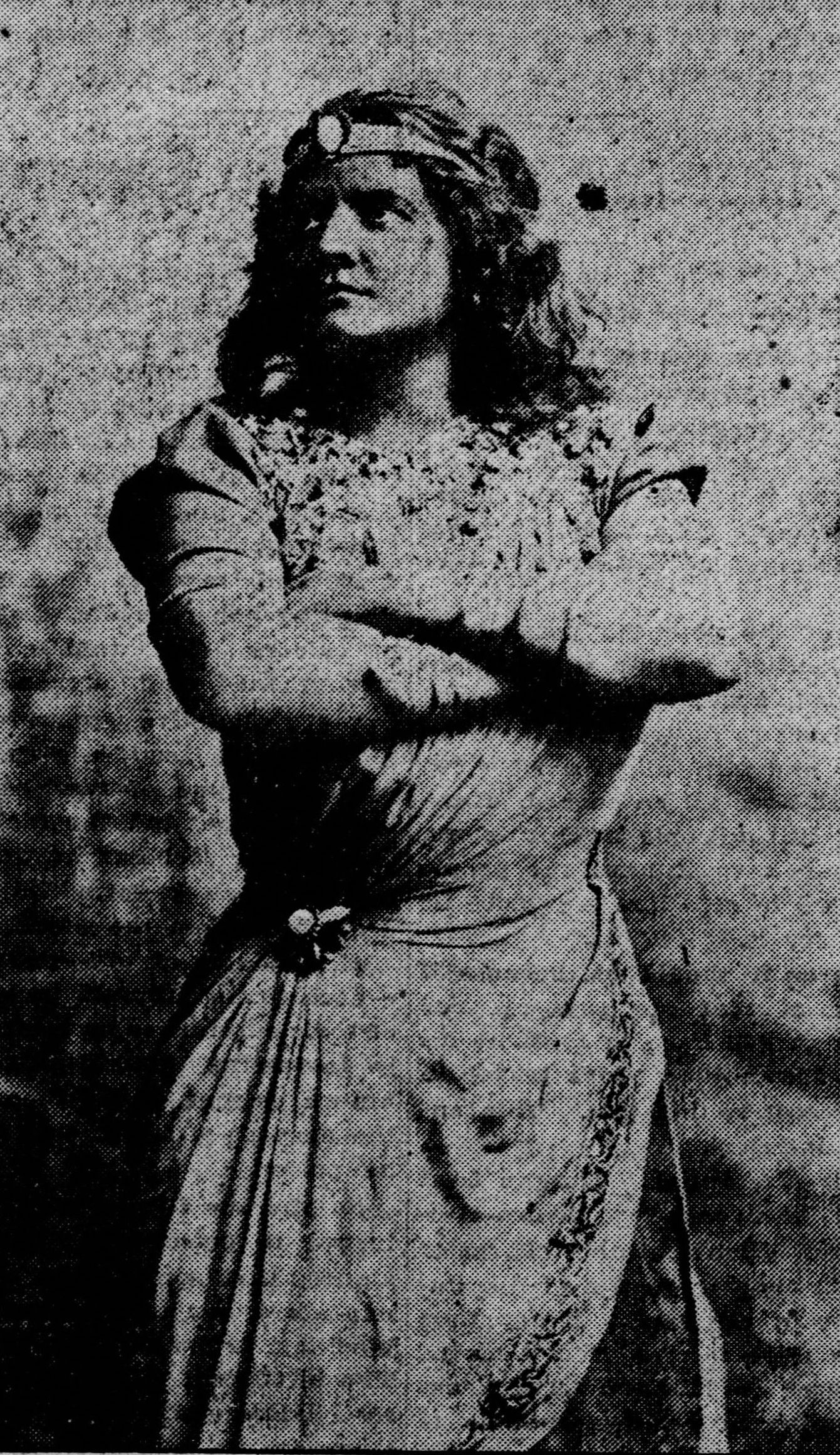
- Curtis as Aida in her professional debut at McVicker's Theater in Chicago, June 1910
- Born: 1879 or 1880; Stratford, Connecticut, U.S.
- Died: February 6, 1962 (aged 82); Fairfield, Connecticut, U.S.
- Education: New England Conservatory; Institute of Musical Art
- Occupations: Soprano; voice teacher
- Organizations: Metropolitan Opera; Philadelphia Grand Opera Company

Vera C. Curtis (1879 or 1880 – February 6, 1962) was an American soprano and voice teacher. Educated at the New England Conservatory and the Institute of Musical Art (now the Juilliard School), she was the first singer who was trained exclusively in the United States to become a principal singer at the Metropolitan Opera (Met); performing with that company from 1912 through 1920. She created roles in two world premieres staged at the Metropolitan Opera House: Lise in Damrosch's Cyrano in 1913 and Queen Carolina in Giordano's Madame Sans-Gêne in 1915. She remained active as an opera and concert singer in the 1920s, notably portraying the title role in Verdi's Aida for the inaugural performance of the Philadelphia Grand Opera Company in 1926. Her final appearance in an opera was as Venus in Wagner's Tannhäuser in a 1929 touring production of the opera staged by the Cincinnati Opera.

After retiring from the opera stage, Curtis continued to sing in a series of lecture-recitals which she presented in cities throughout the United States in the 1930s and 1940s. In 1930 she began working as a voice teacher out of studios in Harlem and Port Chester, New York, and continued to work as a teacher of singing for over three decades. She ceased teaching in May 1961 just nine months before her death in February 1962 at the age of 82.

== Early life and education ==
Vera Cameron Curtis was born in Stratford, Connecticut, one of seven children of John C. Curtis and his wife Adeline Curtis (née Stuart). Sources vary on the year of her birth, with her obituary in Opera News stating she was born in 1880 and the abstract for her papers held in the Schlesinger Library Archives at Harvard University stating she was born in 1879. Her father was a descendant of one of the first Europeans to settle in what became the state of Connecticut. He was also a veteran of the American Civil War and was a recipient of the Medal of Honor for his work with the 9th Connecticut Infantry Regiment. For many years he was the Superintendent of the New England division of the Adams Express Company. Her mother was from a prominent New Haven family.

At the age of 17, Vera Curtis entered the New England Conservatory where she was a pupil of voice teacher William L. Whitney for four years. She also studied with Alfred Giraudet in Boston. After completing her studies at the conservatory, Curtis began her professional stage career in 1905 performing the role of Suzette in the national tour of Alfred Baldwin Sloane and R. H. Burnside's operetta Sergeant Kitty. By the autumn of 1907, she was once again studying singing; this time in New York City at the Institute of Musical Art (now the Juilliard School). There she was a voice student of George Henschel. She also studied with Victor Maurel in New York City.

== Singing career ==
While a student in New York, Curtis made her New York concert debut at a Young People's Concert on December 21, 1907, as the soprano soloist in Mendelssohn's A Midsummer Night's Dream with the New York Philharmonic (NYP) being led by conductor Walter Damrosch. She performed under Damrosch again in 1909; this time with the New York Symphony Orchestra at Carnegie Hall as the Widow in Mendelssohn's Elijah, She also performed in a second Young People's Concert with the NYP in 1909 under the baton of Frank Damrosch (Walter's brother); performing the Mother, the Sandman, and the Dewman in a concert version of Humperdinck's Hansel and Gretel.

Curtis made her grand opera debut with the Aborn English Opera Company at McVicker's Theater in Chicago in the title role of Verdi's Aida on June 1, 1910; using the pseudonym Marie Victor. After this she worked as a leading soprano with Albert Clerk-Jeannotte's short lived Montreal Opera Company. In the spring of 1912 she went on a national tour as a featured soloist with the Russian Symphony Orchestra under conductor Modest Altschuler. She was working as a contract singer at St. Mark's Church in-the-Bowery at the time that she was engaged by the Metropolitan Opera in 1912; notably becoming the first principal singer trained solely in the United States to be offered a contract with the company. She made her debut at the Metropolitan Opera House as the First Lady in Mozart's The Magic Flute on November 23, 1912, with Alfred Hertz conducting.

Curtis sang with the Met through 1920 in a variety of roles; although she achieved her greatest successes in the stage works of Richard Wagner. Her Wagnerian repertoire included the parts of Freia in Das Rheingold, Gutrune in Götterdämmerung, both the Shepherd Boy and Venus in Tannhäuser, and both Sieglinde and Ortlinde in Die Walküre. Her other repertoire at the Met included Desdemona in Verdi's Otello, Euridice in Gluck's Orfeo ed Euridice, Giulietta in Offenbach's The Tales of Hoffmann, Marguerite in Gounod's Faust, Marianne in Richard Strauss's Der Rosenkavalier, Mimì in Puccini's La bohème, Nedda in Leoncavallo's Pagliacci, Santuzza in Mascagni's Cavalleria rusticana, and the tile role in Aida. In 1913 she created the role of Lise in the world premiere of Walter Damrosch's Cyrano at the Met; and two years later she appeared with the company as Queen Carolina in the world premiere of Giordano's Madame Sans-Gêne.

After leaving the Met, Curtis continued to perform. In 1921 she performed the role of Marguerite in a concert version of Faust at Jordan Hall in Boston. In 1922 she toured in concerts with the Cleveland Orchestra. She was a leading soprano with the Philadelphia Grand Opera Company; notably portraying Aida for that company's inaugural performance at the Academy of Music on October 28, 1926. She was heard again with that company as Verdi's Desdemona in 1927; a performance broadcast live on WINS (AM) (then WGBS). In 1929 she performed the role of Venus in Tannhäuser with the Cincinnati Opera; a production which toured to other American cities.

== Later life ==
In the 1930s Curtis ceased performing in operas and on the larger concert stage; although she remained an active performer as a recitalist. During the 1930s and 1940s she toured widely throughout the United States giving a series of lecture-recitals in which she would lecture on specific operas or composers in conjunction with performing arias and excerpts from the works being discussed. In 1930 she began to work as a voice teacher out of two studios; one at 1 East 124th St. in Harlem and the other at the parish house of St. Peter's Episcopal Church in Port Chester, New York. She continued to work as a voice teacher until May 1961; just nine months prior to her death. She died in Fairfield, Connecticut, on February 6, 1962, at the age of 82.
