= Antonio Pini-Corsi =

Dalmatian Italian opera singer

Antonio Pini-Corsi photographed in 1912

Antonio Pini-Corsi (12 June 1859 – 21 April 1918) was a Dalmatian Italian operatic baritone of international renown. He possessed a ripe-toned voice of great flexibility and displayed tremendous skill at patter singing. Pini-Corsi participated in numerous operatic premieres, portraying on stage such characters as Ford in Giuseppe Verdi's Falstaff and Schaunard in Giacomo Puccini's La bohème. Part of the first generation of recorded musicians, Pini-Corsi was one of the finest buffo singers of his era.

== Career ==
Pini-Corsi was born into an Italian musical family in Zara, later known as Zadar, in what is now Croatia. His father Giovanni Pini (a tenor) and his mother Elisabetta Corsi had him educated in singing by Antonio Ravasio and his maternal uncle Achille Corsi, also a tenor. Achille's brother Giovanni and his daughter Emilia were also singers. Many of Pini-Corsi's relatives sang professionally, most notably his brother Gaetano, who was a successful operatic tenor.

He made his professional opera debut in Cremona in 1878 as Dandini in La Cenerentola. Pini-Corsi subsequently appeared in opera houses throughout Italy for the next 15 years, specializing in the comic operas of Gioachino Rossini and Gaetano Donizetti. He made his La Scala debut in 1892 as Don Rolando Ximenes in the first performance of the revised version of Alberto Franchetti's Cristoforo Colombo.

Pini-Corsi's career was now booming. In 1893, he returned to La Scala to portray the title role in Giuseppe Verdi's Rigoletto opposite Nellie Melba as Gilda. Shortly thereafter he portrayed Ford in the premiere of Verdi's final opera, Falstaff, at La Scala on 9 February 1893 at the behest of the composer, who admired his vocal skill and stage craft. During the course of that same year he also sang the role of Ford in Genoa, Rome, Venice and Brescia. He also made an appearance at the Vienna State Opera. On 14 May 1894 he made his Royal Opera House at Covent Garden debut as Lescaut in Giacomo Puccini's Manon Lescaut. Five days later he returned to the house to sing Ford in the company's first production of Falstaff. He then joined the roster of the Opéra de Monte-Carlo in 1895, singing there on and off for two years.

On 1 February 1896, Pini-Corsi portrayed the role of Schaunard in the original production of Puccini's La bohème at the Teatro Regio Torino. He later reprised the role in several productions throughout Italy. He appeared in another new opera, Franchetti's Signor di Pourceaugnac, in both Genoa and Rome in 1898.

The following year he made his debut in the United States when, on 11 October 1899, he performed to acclaim with the New York Metropolitan Opera as Bartolo in The Barber of Seville on tour in Springfield, Massachusetts. He sang with the company for the next two years, appearing as Alfio in Cavalleria rusticana, Bartolo in The Marriage of Figaro, Cajus in The Merry Wives of Windsor, Dr. Dulcamara in L'elisir d'amore, Leporello in Don Giovanni, Masetto in Don Giovanni, Monostatos in The Magic Flute, Sacristan in Tosca, and the title role in Don Pasquale.

In 1902, Pini-Corsi returned to Italy, where he spent seven years, performing mostly at La Scala. Most notably he took part in the premiere performances of Umberto Giordano's Siberia (1903) and Franchetti's La figlia di Iorio (1906), and appeared in Alfredo Catalani's La Wally (1905) and in Der Freischütz (1906). He also was a frequent guest artist at the Opéra de Monte-Carlo, appearing in productions with them in 1903, 1907, and 1909. In 1907 he performed at the Berlin State Opera and in 1908 performed in several operas throughout South America including performances at the Teatro Colón in Buenos Aires. That same year he also made a few appearances at the Vienna State Opera. In 1909 he sang Don Pasquale to Alice Nielsen's Norina with the Boston Opera Company.

On 16 November 1909 Pini-Corsi returned to the Met to portray the role of Bailiff in Werther. He remained with the Met until 1914, appearing in numerous world premieres, including those of the Monk in Walter Damrosch's Cyrano, Happy in La fanciulla del West, the Innkeeper in Engelbert Humperdinck's Königskinder, and Mauprat in Victor Herbert's Madeline. He also appeared in the American premieres of two operas by Ermanno Wolf-Ferrari, Arnolfo in L'amore medico and Pantalone in Le donne curiose, and that of Crisogono in Franchetti's Germania. His other roles at the Met included Alcindoro, Schaunard and Benoit in La bohème, Barnaba in Il maestro di cappella, Don Pasquale, Ford, Geronte in Manon Lescaut, Larivaudière in La fille de Madame Angot, the Night Watchman in Die Meistersinger von Nürnberg, Sacristan in Tosca, and Sir Tristram in Martha.

Pini-Corsi returned to Italy in 1914. In 1915 he sang Don Pasquale and Dulcamara at the Teatro Regio Parma. His last opera appearance was in 1917 in Rossini's Il signor Bruschino at the Teatro Dal Verme, Milan, when his voice, if not as powerful or as steady as it had been 40 years before, was still as agile as ever and used with the same keen intelligence that had always distinguished his performances.

He died in Milan, aged only 58, but his voice may be heard on a number of gramophone recordings which he made during the early years of the 20th century.

He wrote a song called "Tu non mi vuoi più bene", which was recorded by Enrico Caruso.
