= Cyrano (Damrosch) =

Opera by Walter Damrosch, 1976

- Opera by Walter Damrosch
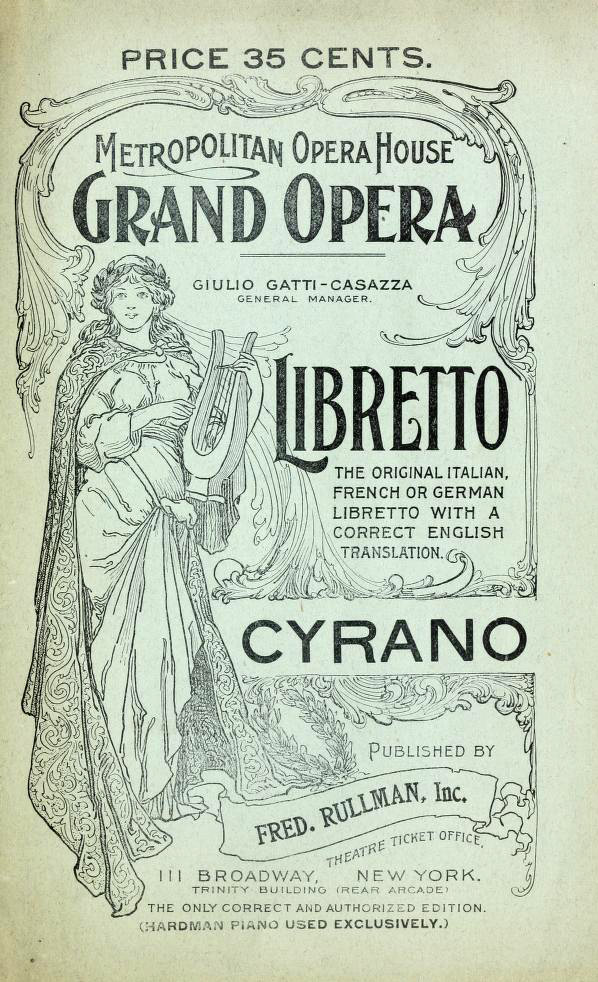
- Souvenir libretto printed for the world premiere of Cyrano at the Metropolitan Opera
- Librettist: William James Henderson
- Language: English
- Based on: Play Cyrano de Bergerac by Edmond Rostand
- Premiere: February 27, 1913; Metropolitan Opera, New York City

Cyrano is an opera in four acts composed by Walter Damrosch to an English language libretto by William James Henderson based on Edmond Rostand's 1897 play, Cyrano de Bergerac. It premiered at the Metropolitan Opera in New York City on February 27, 1913, with Pasquale Amato in the title role and Frances Alda as Roxane.

== Background and performance history ==
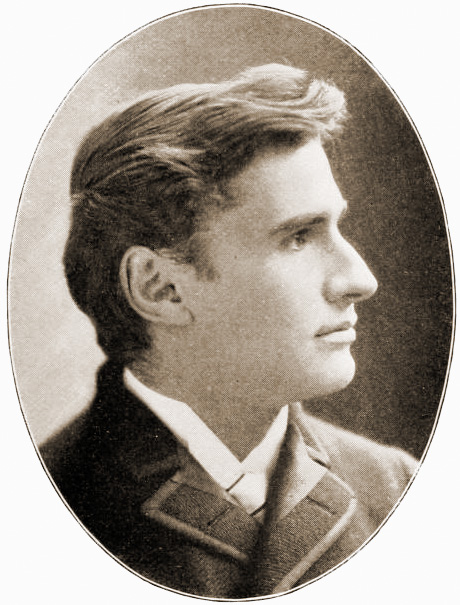
Walter Damrosch, the composer of Cyrano

By the time Damrosch began his Cyrano project, Rostand's play, Cyrano de Bergerac, on which the opera is based, was already well known in the United States. Its first US performance in English had taken place in New York City with Richard Mansfield in the title role in 1898, less than year after its Paris premiere. From 1900 to 1901, Constant Coquelin, who created the title role, had also toured North America performing the play in the original French with Sarah Bernhardt as Roxanne. When Damrosch decided to turn the play into an opera, he commissioned the Anglo-American critic and musicologist, William Henderson to write an English libretto. The libretto closely followed the actions and events of the play, apart from the final confrontation between Roxanne and Cyrano which takes place shortly after the battle at Arras instead of fifteen years later as in the play.

Damrosch had finished composing the opera by 1903, but its first performance opportunity did not come until ten years later. Giulio Gatti-Casazza, the Metropolitan Opera's General Manager from 1908 to 1935, had started a policy of producing at least one new English language opera each season. In 1911 Damrosch invited Gatti-Casazza and Arturo Toscanini to his house to hear excerpts from Cyrano, and it was chosen for the 1912/1913 season. He had revised his original score somewhat and further cuts were made to its original five-hour and half-hour running time during the rehearsal period. Shortly before the opera's opening, Edmond Rostand pronounced himself "indignant" at the liberties which Damrosch and Henderson had taken in adapting his play, particularly the ending. Rostand had never obtained copyright for the play in the United States and could not prevent adaptations there but vowed that he would never allow Damrosch's Cyrano to be performed in any country where the play had been copyrighted.

Cyrano premiered on February 27, 1913, with Pasquale Amato in the title role and Frances Alda (Gatti-Casazza's wife) as Roxanne in a performance conducted by Alfred Hertz. The sets were designed by Antonio Rovescalli while the costumes were designed by the famed Paris company, Maison Muelle. The work was warmly received by the audience at the opening night, but less so by the critics. The critic for the Boston Evening Transcript had praise for the libretto but found the music "lack[ing] individuality, imagination, and communicative force." Robert Aldrich in his opening night review for The New York Times likewise praised the libretto as a literary work and noted how well Henderson's verse was suited to the needs of the singers, but went on to say:

The music of Cyrano is undoubtedly composed with skill, with verve, and in many parts with spontaneity. It cannot be called music of inspiration, of originality, or, in the highest sense, of power.

Similar views were expressed by the critic for The Theatre magazine. Cyrano ran for four more performances at the Met that season and was performed by the company once in Atlanta, Georgia, in April 1913 but was never performed by the Met again. Damrosch revised his opera over the years and revived it in its new version in concert performances Carnegie Hall which opened on 21 February 1941. Damrosch himself conducted the Carnegie Hall revival. Ezio Pinza was originally scheduled to sing the title role, but in the end it was taken by Thomas L. Thomas after Pinza withdrew from the project less than a month before the opening night. The revival had not essentially changed the critics' assessment of the work. Edward O'Gorman of the New York Post wrote that its score was one that:

the average listener might not journey far to hear, but one that he would probably like once he got there, and remember with pleasure if he didn't stay too long.

The 1941 Carnegie Hall run marked the last time the opera was publicly performed.

== Roles ==
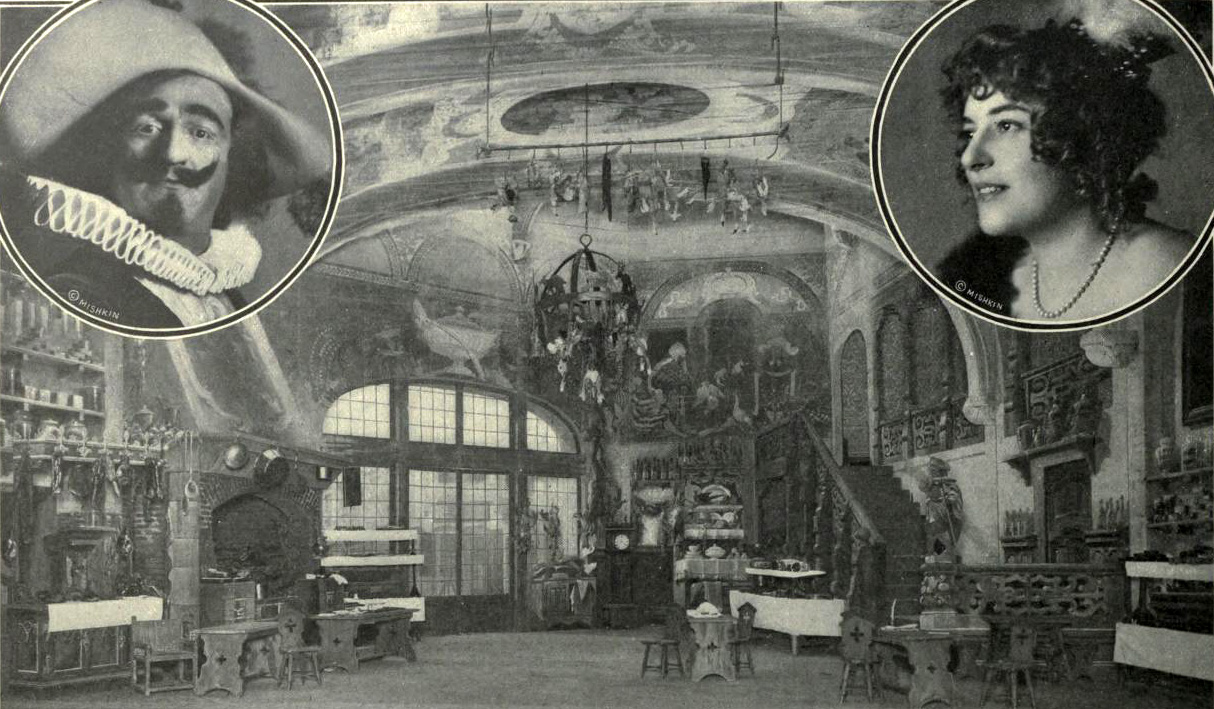
Stage setting for Act 2 of Cyrano with inset portraits of Pasquale Amato as Cyrano and Frances Alda as Roxanne

Role	Voice type	Premiere Cast, 27 February 1913 (Conductor: Alfred Hertz)
Cyrano de Bergerac, a poet and soldier in the Gascony cadets	baritone	Pasquale Amato
Roxane, Cyrano's cousin, in love with Christian	soprano	Frances Alda
Christian, a Gascony cadet in love with Roxanne	tenor	Riccardo Martin
Ragueneau, owner of a pastry shop in Paris	tenor	Albert Reiss
Lise, Ragueneau's wife	soprano	Vera Curtis
Duenna, Roxane's chaperone	contralto	Marie Mattfeld
De Guiche, commander of the Gascony regiment	bass	Putnam Griswold
Le Bret, Cyrano's close friend and fellow soldier	bass	William Hinshaw
Flower Girl	soprano	Louise Cox
Mother Superior	contralto	Florence Mulford
Montfleury, an actor	tenor	Lambert Murphy
Cadet	tenor	Lambert Murphy
Monk	bass	Antonio Pini-Corsi
Musketeer	bass	Basil Ruysdael
Musketeer	bass	Marcel Reiner
Cavalier	tenor	Austin Hughes
Cavalier	bass	Paolo Ananian
Cavalier	baritone	Louis Kreidler
Cavalier	bass	Maurice Sapio
Chorus of précieuses, pages, nuns, cavaliers, Gascony cadets, marquises

== Synopsis ==
The opera, like Rostand's play, is set in France in 1640 against the background of the Siege of Arras during the Thirty Years' War.

=== Act 1 ===
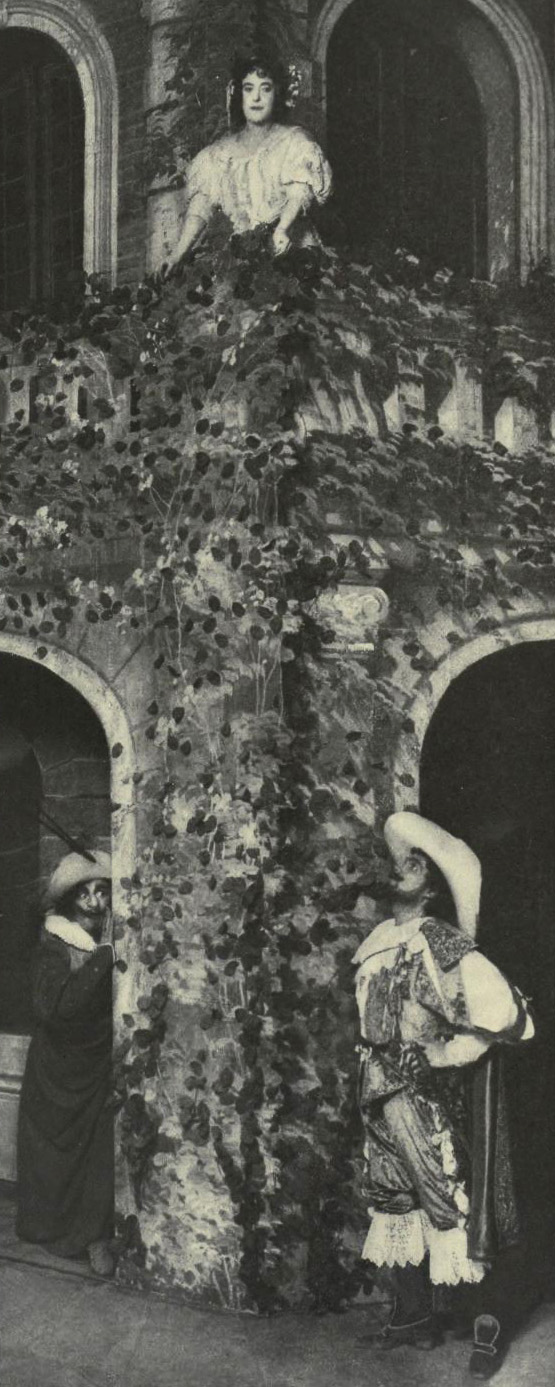
The balcony scene from Act 3 of Cyrano. Left to right are Pasquale Amato (Cyrano), Frances Alda (Roxane), and Riccardo Martin (Christian).

In the theatre of the Hôtel de Bourgogne in Paris the audience arrives for a performance. Cavaliers, marquises, a musketeer, a flower-girl, and pages enter and take their places as spectators. Christian and Le Bret enter. Christian asks him the name of the woman that usually sits in a certain box, and confesses that he has fallen in love with her. Le Bret replies that she is Roxane, a cousin of Cyrano de Bergerac. Ragueneau enters and tells of Cyrano's skill with both the pen and the sword. Roxane appears with her duenna and is immediately surrounded by suitors. De Guiche escorts to her box. The play begins.

Montfleury, an actor whom Cyrano had banished from the stage for a month because of his lack of acting skills and attentions to Roxanne begins his performance. Cyrano enters and commands him to stop. De Guiche protests the interruption of the play and insults Cyrano by referring to his large nose. Cyrano and Le Guiche engage in sword fight. De Guiche is wounded and leaves followed by the rest of the audience, including Roxane who greets Cyrano as she departs with her duenna. After they leave Cyrano reveals to Le Bret his love for Roxanne and the shame he feels at having such a large nose. A message from Roxane is brought in asking for an interview with her cousin the next day at Ragueneau's cook-shop. Le Bret goes out but returns immediately, saying that De Guiche with a hundred men is seeking Cyrano with intent to fight him again. In the meantime actors and actresses enter for a rehearsal, and Cyrano invites them all out to see the contest.

=== Act 2 ===
The next day at Ragueneau's pastry shop, a gathering place for poets, Cyrano awaits his appointment with Roxane and writes her a letter, telling of his love for her. When he sees her duenna approaching, he sends the rest of the people out of the shop and orders food for the duenna, telling her to eat it outside while he speaks with Roxane. Roxane thanks him for punishing De Guiche the night before and asks him if he is still the same friendly, "elder brother" to her that he used to be when they played together as children. She then tells him that she loves a man named Christian who has not yet declared his love for her, that he too is a Gascony cadet, and asks Cyrano he keep him safe. Cyrano promises her that he will and after Roxanne leaves, sorrowfully destroys his letter.

Several Gascony cadets enter, Le Bret and Christian among them, and congratulate Cyrano on his victory over De Guiche and his hundred men. De Guiche arrives with his attendants and announces that as they will shortly be in battle side by side, he will forget the past. Once De Guiche has left, the cadets demand that Cyrano tell them about his fight with De Guiche and his men. Christian asks a fellow cadet about Cyrano and the cadet tells him that no one ever dares to mention his nose because they would soon have a fight on their hands. As Cyrano is recounting the fight, Christian is overcome with bravado and interrupts him with a reference to his large nose. When Cyrano discovers who he is, he ignores the insult, but Christian repeats it two more times. Cyrano orders the room to be cleared. Once the cadets have left, Cyrano tells Christian that Roxane is in love with him and is expecting a letter. When Christian confesses that he is a fool, unskilled in speech, and cannot write, Cyrano offers to write the letter and to help him win Roxane's hand. Christian accepts the offer. The cadets re-enter and are amazed to see Christian and Cyrano unwounded and friendly towards each other.

=== Act 3 ===
In the square outside Roxane's house music is heard and soon she and her duenna come from the house opposite. Roxane lingers alone at the fountain. De Guiche comes to say farewell before going to war, and tells her that the Gascony cadets, including her cousin Cyrano, are in his command. She speaks kindly to him fearing for Christian, and he tries to embrace her. To keep Christian from going to war, she tells De Guiche that Cyrano loves the battlefield and if he really wants revenge on him, he will leave the Gascony cadets behind. De Guiche is delighted and tells Roxanne that he will meet her later.

Meanwhile, Cyrano and Christian enter the square, with Cyrano coaching Christian on the speech he is to make to Roxane. Cyrano sees Roxane approaching and goes away. Roxane, expecting to meet De Guiche, is surprised and delighted to find Christian instead. However, when he starts talking to her, he appears so stupid that Roxane impatiently leaves him and goes into her house. When Cyrano returns, Christian desperately pleads for his help. Cyrano relents and promises to prompt him in a serenade to Roxane. They stand under her balcony with Cyrano feeding his words to Christian. They are so successful that Roxanne says that she will come back into the square. Afraid of being caught out, Christian urges her to stay inside. She then invites Christian to climb up to the balcony. Cyrano tells Christian to go take his kiss, while he remains outside, vigilant and sorrowful. Cyrano hears someone approaching and calls out to Roxane.

As she and Christian come out into the square, a monk approaches with a letter for her. The letter is from De Guiche, saying that he will meet her there alone within an hour. Realising that monk does not know the contents of the letter, Roxane tells him that it is a command from De Guiche for her to be married to Christian immediately. Roxane, Christian, and the monk enter her house while Cyrano stays outside to delay De Guiche. As De Guiche approaches, Cyrano falls in front of him as from a great height, and starts giving him a lengthy and fantastic explanation of how he fell. Roxane and Christian, followed by the monk and the duenna, appear at the door of the house, and Cyrano tells De Guiche that they are man and wife. De Guiche angrily commands Christian to say farewell to his bride and hands him the order to go to war. Roxane entrusts Christian to Cyrano's care, and he promises that Christian will send her a letter every day.

=== Act 4 ===
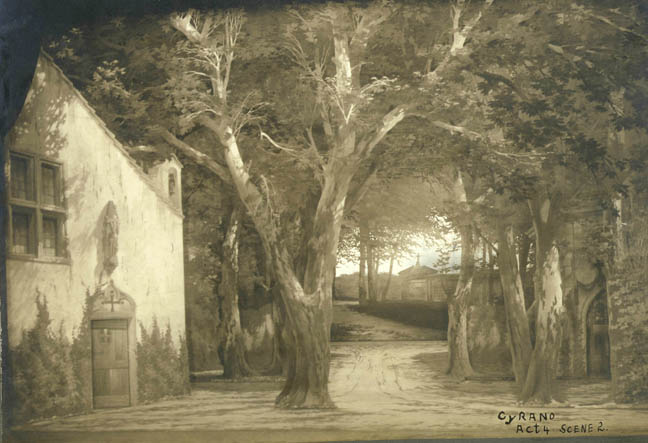
Antonio Rovescalli's stage design for Act 4, Scene 2 of Cyrano

Scene 1 At dawn in the camp of the Gascony cadets outside Arras all are asleep except Le Bret, who is on guard and Cyrano who is sneaking back into the camp. Le Bret rebukes him for risking his life to send off a letter for another man, but Cyrano tells Le Bret of his promise, and goes into his tent to write another letter. Christian comes into Cyrano's tent telling him that he wished he had time to write a last letter before they go into battle. Cyrano hands him the one he has just written and asks him if that will do. Christian discovers a tear stain on the paper. Cyrano explains this by saying that he had made himself believe he was Christian. He also tells Christian that because Roxane was so eager for letters, he had sent off more than Christian knew about, two a day sometimes. Christian realizes the risk Cyrano must have taken and looks at him in astonishment. Just then Roxane, attended by Ragueneau, arrives at the camp to see Christian. Cyrano protests that she must not stay, and De Guiche announces that within an hour there will be a battle where they now stand.

Roxane dismisses De Guiche, and Cyrano goes into his tent. She then tells Christian that his wonderful letters have revealed his spirit to her and that she loves him even more now. He protests, but can only break away by asking her to go speak with his comrades, who are about to go into battle. As she leaves Cyrano enters, and Christian tells him that it is he whom Roxane loves and not himself. Cyrano replies that Christian must then tell her of their compact and let her choose between them, but Christian rushes off. Roxane enters searching for him, and as she is speaking to Cyrano a shot is heard. Christian's body is brought in. Grief-stricken, Roxane throws herself on his body and draws from his pocket his last passionate letter to her. Cyrano realizes that now more than ever she will love the man she supposes her husband to have been, and that because of his death it is impossible for the real writer of the letters to be declared. Roxane is borne off and Cyrano rides into the battle, where he falls seriously wounded.

Scene 2 In the garden of a convent several miles from the battlefield, nuns are gathered praying. Roxane, pale and disheveled, enters with Ragueneau seeking shelter. The Mother Superior welcomes her and tells her that there are already two fugitives inside. As they all go into the convent, Cyrano, mortally wounded, wanders into the garden and sits on a stone bench. Roxane comes out, and recognizing him, expresses her pity and talks of their childhood days. He then speaks of Christian, and she takes out his last letter. Cyrano takes the letter and at her request begins to read it aloud. Night falls, but he keeps on reading. Roxane knows that he cannot see the pages. She tells him that she knows he is repeating not reading the letter, and that it must be his. Then she realizes what he has done, and that the man she had loved was really Cyrano. Cyrano denies everything, even that he loves her. He becomes delirious with pain and babbles of past battles before briefly regaining his senses. He speaks of his coming death, and rejoices that he will die with his soldier's honor unstained. He then collapses into the arms of Le Bret and Ragueneau and dies as Roxanne kisses him.

== Sources ==
- Alda, Frances. Women and Tenors. Read Books, 2007 (originally published in 1937 by Houghton Mifflin). ISBN 1-4067-3654-6
- Aldrich, Richard. "'Cyrano' Applauded at its Premiere". The New York Times. February 28, 1913
- Boston Evening Transcript. "Mr. Damrosch's New Opera". February 28, 1913, p. 12
- Damrosch, Walter, and Henderson, W. J. Cyrano. Fred Rullman Inc., 1913 (copy of the libretto printed for the premiere performance)
- Howard, Marjorie. "Muelle—Known to Every Singer", The New York Times Magazine, April 25, 1915, p. SM18
- Metropolitan Opera Archives. Cyrano. MetOpera Database
- The New York Times. "Rostand Indignant at 'Cyrano' Here". February 21, 1913
- The New York Times. "Damrosch's 'Cyrano' This Week's Opera Novelty". February 23, 1913
- The New York Times "Pinza and Novotna Quit 'Cyrano' Roles". 29 January 1941, p. 19
- Ordway, Edith Bertha. The Opera Book. Sully and Kleinteich, 1917, pp. 71–76
- Time, "Old Dr. Damrosch". 3 March 1941
- The Theatre. "'Cyrano' Heard at the Metropolitan Opera House". Vol. XVII, No. 146, April 1913, pp. 106–107

This article incorporates text from The Opera Book, by Edith Bertha Ordway, a publication from 1917, now in the public domain in the United States.
