= Carl Heins =

German musician

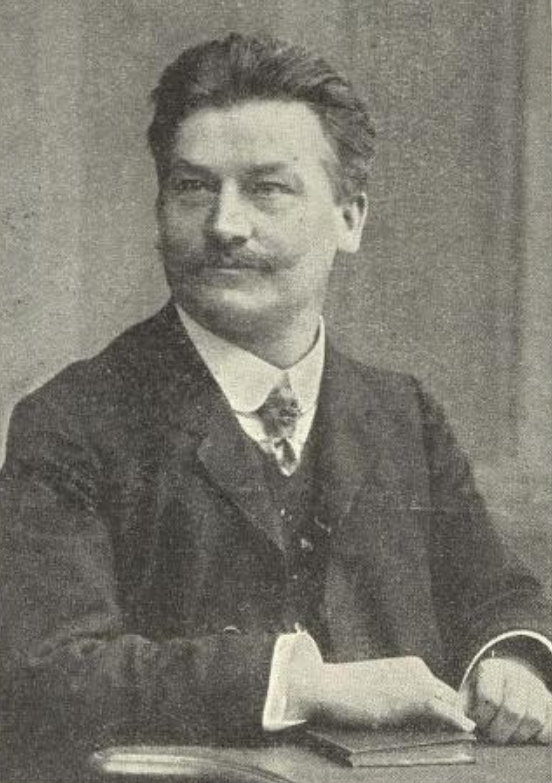

Carl Heins (8 June 1859 - 10 September 1923) was a German pianist, and a composer of light salon music in classical music style. He wrote both solo piano works and parlor songs.

Heins' pieces show a special pianoesque ability to fashion pretty melodies picturesquely in the salon style of the time. His competency on the keyboard led him to perform and compose. He composed the song 'Zwei Dunkle Augen', which was recorded by the tenor Fritz Wunderlich. Stylistically his music is similar to that of his older compatriot Carl Bohm.

Robert Leonhardt, an operatic baritone who sang with the New York Metropolitan Opera company between 1913 and 1922, made numerous recordings for many major record labels, both in Europe and in the United States. An early recording he made on Gramophone 42325 with matrix number 1113B[54] was "Zwei dunkle Augen" by Carl Heins. Leonhardt recorded it onto a 78 rpm in October 1901 when he was 24.

== Works ==
Thoughts of Home Traute Heimat Op. 279 No. 2

- Im Hochland. Charakterstück (In Highland. Character Piece)
- Village Idyll
- Bärentanz (Dance of the Bear)
- Senner Traum (Rêve du vache)
- Slumber Song: The Widow to Her Child, for voice & violin
- Die Spieluhr, (The Music Box). Bagatelle
- SCHLIESS'IN DEIN HERZ MICH WIEDER EIN! Fantasie - transcription
- Veilchen (Violets) Op.6
- Am Weihnachtsabend (Christmas-eve) (Veille de Noel), Op.43
- Rose D'or, Mazurka Brillante pour Piano, Op.106 No.3
- Gesang der Vöglein (Song of the Birds), Idylle for the Pianoforte, Op.120
- Gitana, Mazurka Brillante Op.156
- Unter dem Weihnachtsstern (Round the Christmas-tree/Sous l'étoile de Noël), Salonstück für Pianoforte, Op. 160
- Abschied von der Sennerin (Reapers Parting Kiss) Op.172
- Am Feensee (By the fairy lake), Op.173
- Hirtenidyll (Idylle de Berger), Op.174
- Mädchentraum, Salonstück, Op. 176
- Sommerlust- Summer's delight, Op.181, No.3
- Rosenfee (The Rose Fairy), Mazurka-Caprice, Op.185
- Rückkehr nach der Heimath (G dur). Op. 190/3. Werk Nr. 3 aus "Wanderleben. Vier melodiöse und instructive Characterstücke für Pianoforte".
- Mignon Lyrisches Tonstück, op. 206, No. 1
- Zwei Dunkle Augen (Two Dark Eyes), Op. 212
- Morgenthau, (In the morning Dew), Op.245
- Rotkäppchen (Little Red Riding Hood), Op.247
- Aus Tyrol! From the Tyrol. Depart four Tyrol. Op. 281/5. Tyrolienne.
