= Dell'Arte Opera Ensemble =

dell'Arte Opera Ensemble was an opera company in New York City devoted to nurturing emerging singers through rehearsal and performance opportunities, coaching, seminars, and master classes until its disbanding in 2026. It was founded in 2000 by opera coach and conductor Christopher Fecteau with the goal of training young opera artists and presenting them in professional productions. Through its Repertoire Development Program, the company features the work of emerging performers, designers, directors and conductors in both standard and rarely-heard masterworks. Several New York premieres have been presented, such as Salieris' "Falstaff," Titus' "Rosina" and (in 2018) Salieri's "La Cifra." In December 2010, the company presented the first performance in New York City of Engelbert Humperdinck's Königskinder since its premiere one hundred years earlier at the Metropolitan Opera.

== Participants ==
Singers performing with dell'Arte range from those who have just finished music school to those pursuing regional careers and even covering major roles at the Metropolitan Opera. Among dell'Arte's noteworthy recent projects is a 2010 performance of Engelbert Humperdinck's little-known "other opera," Königskinder, celebrating the centennial of its premiere at the Met. Each summer, the company engages up to 60 young artists in its Repertoire Development Project, preparing them to sing debut roles in frequently performed operas. Presentations have included Die Zauberflöte, Ariadne auf Naxos, Don Giovanni, Le nozze di Figaro, Lucia di Lammermoor, Il trittico, and La bohème. Performances during the past several seasons have taken place in the East Village at Theatre 80 St. Mark's and The East 13th Street Theatre and as a Summer Share at LaMama Theatre on East 4th Street.

Participation in the Ensemble is completely free for the singers, who are selected in open auditions, and is supported by individual and institutional donors. Current and former singers have performed at the Metropolitan Opera, New York City Opera, Glimmerglass Opera, Leipzig Opera, and English National Opera, among many others.

== Founder ==
The founder of dell'Arte Opera Ensemble, Christopher Fecteau, has been an opera coach and conductor for over 20 years, working with companies such as Bronx Opera, DiCapo Opera, Opera Illinois, Harrisburg Opera, Opera Theatre of Philadelphia, Opera Company of Brooklyn, Brooklyn Repertory Opera, Amore Opera, Amato Opera, Skylight Music Theatre, and Opera in the Heights. He counts over 50 operas in his repertoire, including several world and regional premieres. In 2000 he founded dell'Arte Opera Ensemble and remains its Artistic Director. Under his leadership dell'Arte has produced over 45 workshop and mainstage presentations of mainly standard repertoire, including full New York City productions of Ariadne auf Naxos, Der Rosenkavalier, I Capuleti e i Montecchi, La clemenza di Tito, Don Giovanni, Manon, La bohème, Anna Bolena, Le nozze di Figaro, Il trittico, Lucia di Lammermoor, and Königskinder.

Fecteau's special interest is re-examining orchestral and operatic works for their possibilities in chamber settings. He was commissioned by Skylight Opera Theatre in Milwaukee to create a new version of Gounod's Roméo et Juliette, adapting the original music and Shakespeare's text and story line into one another in a two-act format which the Milwaukee Sentinel called "a miracle." Other arranging projects have included chamber music reductions of Ariadne auf Naxos, La clemenza di Tito, and Anna Bolena for dell'Arte and I Capuleti e i Montecchi for Corleone Opera’s tour of the Czech Republic. Two new arrangements, for Ariadne auf Naxos and Die Zauberflöte have been featured in Berkeley/West Edge Opera productions, and his Ariadne auf Naxos reduction has also been featured at Winter Opera St. Louis. Fecteau has created arrangements for "Fünf Lieder" by Alma Mahler as well as for the album Sleep is Behind the Door by soprano Courtenay Budd. Notable recital appearances at the piano include a salon-style program with Sherrill Milnes for Orlando Opera, and the world premiere of Valerie Saalbach's song cycle Catarina to Camoens at the 2003 International Festival of Women Composers in Florida.
