= Gerd Puritz =

German biographer

Gerd Puritz (July 7, 1914 in Hamburg – June 5, 2007) was the son and biographer of the German soprano Elisabeth Schumann. He moved with his family to England in 1948 and worked for the German Service of the BBC. After the death of his first wife, Biddy, he remarried in 1997 and moved to the Netherlands with his Dutch wife in 2002 where he died. He is survived by his sons Christian and Rupert, his daughter Joy, and granddaughters Sophie and Alice.
