= Herman Jadlowker =

Operatic tenor (1877–1953)

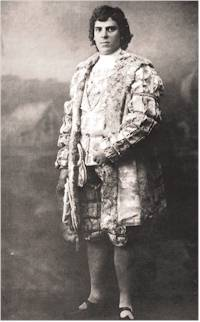

Background information
- Genres: opera
- Instrument: voice (tenor)

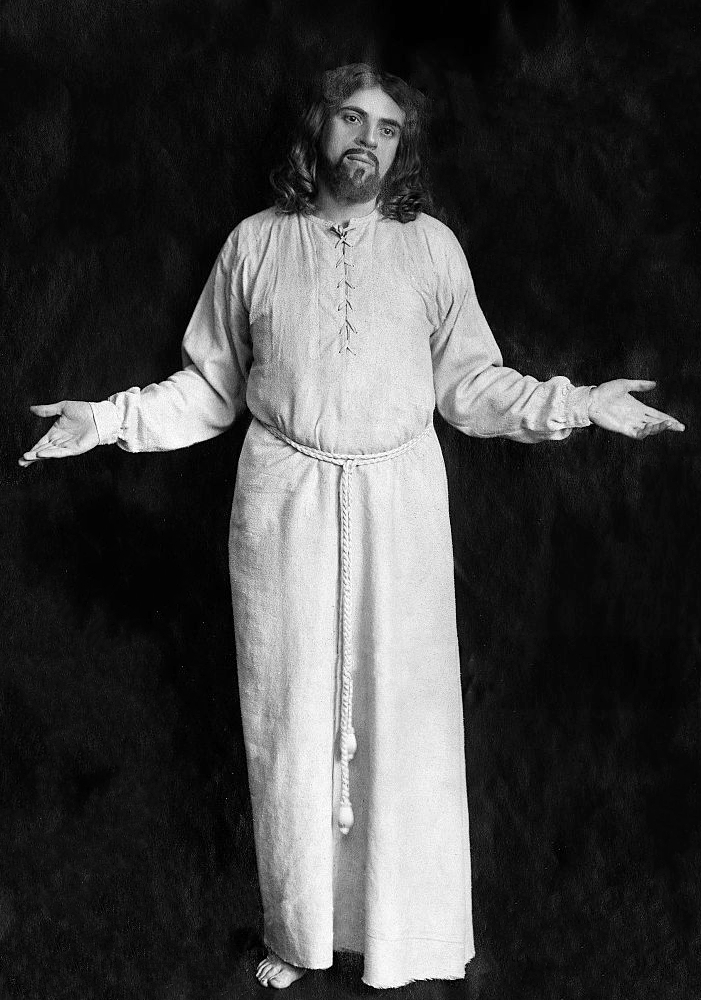
Hermann Jadlowker in 1914

Herman (Hermann) Jadlowker (17 July 1877, in Riga – 13 May 1953, in Tel Aviv) was a leading Latvian-born dramatic tenor of Russian (later Israeli) nationality who enjoyed an important international career during the first quarter of the 20th century.

His virtuoso recordings of arias from Idomeneo and The Barber of Seville, among others, are considered by some to be classics of the gramophone, although reviews of his operatic performances, especially during his brief tenure in New York with the Metropolitan Opera, were decidedly mixed. At the Met he was chosen to create the tenor role in Versiegelt, a one-act opera by Leo Blech, in January 1912. He also created the role of the Königssohn in the 1910 premiere of Königskinder by Engelbert Humperdinck.

== Career and recordings ==
In order to escape from a commercial career into which his father tried to force him, Jadlowker ran away from home as a lad of 15. He journeyed to Vienna, where he studied classical singing with Josef Gänsbacher. In 1899 (some sources say 1897), he made his operatic début at Cologne in Kreutzer's Nachtlager von Granada. He then secured engagements in Stettin and then at Karlsruhe. Here the German Kaiser Wilhelm II heard him and was so impressed that he offered the tenor a five-year contract at the Royal Opera in Berlin. Jadlowker sang also in Stuttgart, Hamburg, Amsterdam, Vienna, Lemberg, Prague, Budapest and Boston during the course of his career.

In 1910 and 1912, Jadlowker appeared at the New York Metropolitan Opera House, where he proved to be one of the company's most versatile artists in the major German, Italian, and French roles although his performances were overshadowed by those of Enrico Caruso and Leo Slezak.

He returned to Europe prior to the outbreak of World War I and continued his operatic career in a number of German cities. During the 1920s, Jadlowker sang increasingly on the concert platform and, in 1929, he was chosen to be chief cantor at the Riga synagogue. Jadlowker subsequently became a voice teacher at the Riga Conservatory before emigrating to Palestine with his wife in 1938. He taught in Jerusalem and Tel Aviv, dying in the latter city at the age of 75.

Jadlowker possessed a dark-hued, lyric-dramatic tenor voice of extraordinary flexibility. His agile vocal technique enabled him to sing runs, trills and other coloratura embellishments with astonishing ease and accuracy (although the basic timbre of his voice was not sweet or seductive). He made a large number of records in Europe and America across a 20-year period, commencing in 1907. Most of these recordings—which include arias by composers as diverse as Mozart, Auber, Verdi, Rossini and Wagner—can be heard on CD reissues, mainly on the Marston and Preiser labels.
