= Bella Alten =

Polish opera singer (1877–1962)

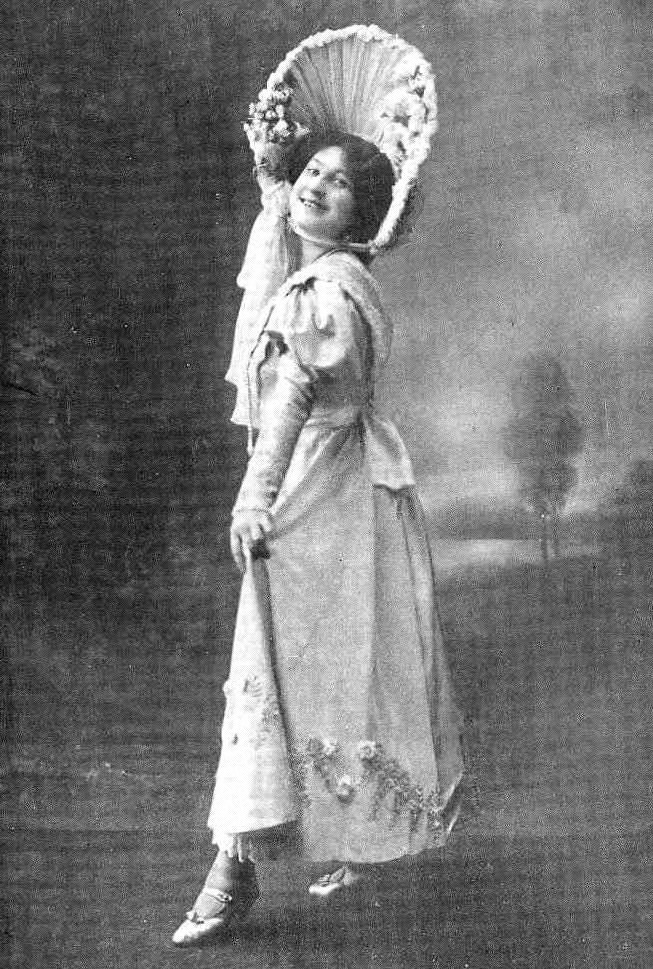
Bella Alten as Musetta in La bohème

Bella Alten (30 June 1877 – 31 December 1962) was an operatic soprano who performed at the Metropolitan Opera House during the early 1900s. Bella Alten was born in Zaskaczewo, Poland. She studied with Gustav Engel and Joachim at the Imperial Conservatory in Berlin, and later with Aglaja Orgeni in Dresden. Her first appearance in opera was as Aennchen in Der Freischütz in 1897 after which engagements followed in Berlin, Brunswick, Cologne and London. She was singing Cherubino in Le Nozze di Figaro, Nedda in Pagliacci and Eva in Die Meistersinger von Nürnberg under Hans Richter when Heinrich Conried, the Metropolitan Opera's General Manager, heard her at the Covent Garden and engaged her for the Met.

Her New York debut took place in November 1904 as Cherubino in Le Nozze di Figaro in a cast that included Emma Eames, Marcella Sembrich and Antonio Scotti.

During her nine seasons at the Metropolitan (1904–1908 and 1909–1914) she sang 31 different roles and a total of 426 performances. She appeared in casts that included famous singers such as Enrico Caruso, Frances Alda, Pol Plançon, Nellie Melba, Emmy Destinn, Ernestine Schumann-Heink, Pasquale Amato, Olive Fremstad, Louise Homer, and Geraldine Farrar, among others.

Her operatic career included six Metropolitan premiere performances – Adele in Die Fledermaus (1905), Gretel in Hänsel und Gretel (1905), Saffi in Der Zigeunerbaron (1906), Olga in Fedora (1906), Columbina in Le Donne Curiose (1912), and Lisetta in L'amore Medico (1914).

In November 1905 when she sang Gretel in the premiere Metropolitan performance of Hänsel und Gretel, the composer Engelbert Humperdinck was in the audience. This opera received 11 performances that first season and was selected by Theodore Roosevelt's wife as a benefit for the Legal Aid Society. Alten sang Gretel in this opera every season she was with the Met (77 times.) The one season she was not there the opera wasn’t presented. Her other most frequently performed roles were Musetta in La Bohème (68 times), and Nedda in Pagliacci (34 times).

From 1908 to 1909, Alten went to Braunchweig, Germany, where she created Madama Butterfly for that city. She also appeared in Bayreuth. Her only recordings date from this period; three selections from Madama Butterfly and the Ballatella from Pagliacci recorded for the Gramophone Company and all sung in German.

Alten also appeared on Broadway as Maid Marian in Reginald De Koven's Robin Hood with Wallace Hyde and Florence Wickham. This opened on 6 May 1912 at the New Amsterdam Theatre and ran for 64 performances. The popular air from this work, Oh Promise Me, is still heard frequently at weddings today.

During her Metropolitan career in 1912, Bella Alten married Hermann Deri, an Austrian State Banker, and became Bella Alten-Deri. She returned to Vienna and continued to sing at both the Wiener Hofoper and Volksoper. She gave concerts and radio broadcasts as late as 1936. When the Nazis came to power in Austria, she and her husband moved to London where she died on 31 December 1962, following her husband's death in 1941.
