= Hermann Goetz =

German composer (1840–1876)

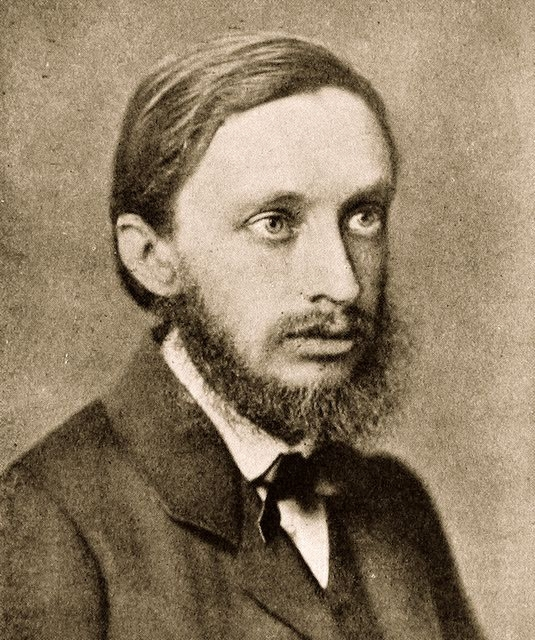
- Born: 7 December 1840; Königsberg, Province of Prussia
- Died: 3 December 1876; Hottingen, Switzerland
- Occupations: Composer; Organist; Music teacher

Hermann Gustav Goetz (7 December 1840 – 3 December 1876) was a German composer who spent much of his career in Switzerland. He is best known for his 1872 opera Der Widerspänstigen Zähmung, based on Shakespeare's The Taming of the Shrew.

== Life ==
Goetz was born in Königsberg in the Province of Prussia. The son of a salesman, he came into contact with music early in his life. However, he did not receive his first serious piano lesson until 1857 – although he already had begun to compose some years before. At the end of the 1850s, he began to study for a degree in mathematics, but broke this off after three terms to study at the Stern Conservatory in Berlin, where he studied piano and composition with Hans von Bülow. In 1862, he graduated from the conservatory. He then moved to Switzerland in 1863. The following year, Goetz was appointed as city organist of Winterthur in Switzerland (thanks to the assistance of Carl Reinecke), where he taught the piano and began to make his name as a composer. In 1868, he married, and two years later moved to the village of Hottingen, today a suburb of Zürich, but remained employed in Winterthur until 1872. Between 1870 and 1874, he wrote reviews for a music magazine.

After ten years spent as a critic, pianist and conductor, he spent the last three years of his life composing. Due to the increasing seriousness of his tuberculosis, from which he had suffered from the 1850s, Goetz had to withdraw from teaching and concert performance.

The conductor Felix Weingartner found it "incomprehensible that his delightful opera comique, Der Widerspänstigen Zähmung, should have entirely disappeared from the repertoire." Another great admirer of Goetz's compositions was George Bernard Shaw, who praised Goetz's Symphony in F above anything in the genre by Mendelssohn, Schumann, and Brahms.

Goetz died aged 35, at Hottingen, of tuberculosis.

== Style ==
Although Goetz showed active interest in the important artistic trends of his own time (on the one hand Liszt and Wagner, on the other Brahms), his own compositional style was more influenced by Mozart and Mendelssohn, and to a lesser degree by Schumann. Goetz's music is defined by lyricism and great clarity, and in general terms can be defined as quiet and introverted. Goetz almost completely avoided spectacular effects. Great mastery of compositional technique is characteristic of Goetz's style, which is particularly apparent in the connectedness of motifs and the technical depth of movements.

Goetz was no radical forger of new musical paths, but rather a composer in total control of his compositional technique. For a long time, he was almost forgotten, although Gustav Mahler performed a number of his works; only since the 1990s have his works been revived.

== Works ==
Goetz's compositions include a symphony, two piano concertos, a violin concerto in one movement, much piano music, a piano trio, piano quartet, piano quintet, and sonata for piano four-hands (two players). There are also two operas, Der Widerspänstigen Zähmung (based on Shakespeare's The Taming of the Shrew) and, much less successful, the three-act opera Francesca von Rimini, to a libretto by the composer and Joseph Victor Wildmann, based on Dante's Inferno (premiered at Mannheim, 30 September 1877).

=== Operas ===
- Der Widerspänstigen Zähmung, opera (1868–73)
- Francesca von Rimini, incomplete opera (1875–77, overture and act 3 completed by Ernst Frank)

=== Vocal works ===
- Psalm 137 for soprano, choir and orchestra, Op. 14 (1864)
- Nenie (a poem by Friedrich Schiller) for choir and orchestra, Op. 10 (1874)
- songs
- choral anthems

=== Orchestral works ===
- Symphony in E minor (1866, only fragments survive)
- Symphony in F major, Op. 9 (1873)
- Spring Overture, Op. 15 (1864)
- Piano Concerto No. 1 in E♭ major (1861)
- Piano Concerto No. 2 in B♭ major, Op. 18 (1867)
- sketches of a third piano concerto in D major
- Violin Concerto in G major Op. 22 (1868)

=== Chamber music ===
- Piano trio in G minor, Op. 1 (1863)
- Three Light Pieces, for violin and piano (1863)
- String Quartet in B♭ major (1865–66)
- Piano Quartet in E major, Op. 6 (1867)
- Piano Quintet in C minor, Op. 16 (1874)

=== Piano music ===
- 2 Sonatinas (F major, E♭ major), Op. 8 (1871)
- Lose Blätter (Loose Sheets), Op. 7 (1864–69)
- Genrebilder (Genre Paintings), Op. 13 (1870–76)
- Four handed sonata for piano in D major (from 1855)
- Four handed sonata for piano in G minor, Op. 17 (1865)

== Discography ==
- Hermann Goetz and Heinrich Schulz-Beuthen, Piano Music, Kirsten Johnson, piano, Guild GMCD 7282; includes Goetz' Lose Blätter, op. 7, and Genrebilder, op. 13.
- Robert Schumann, Hermann Goetz and Stephen Heller, L'oiseau-Prophète, Ziad Kreidy, piano; includes Goetz' Lose Blätter, op. 7, and Schumann's Waldszenen, Op. 82.
- Hermann Goetz – Orchestral Works and Concertos: Volker Banfield (piano), Gottfried Schneider (violin), Stephanie Stiller (soprano), NDR Chor, Radio-Philharmonie Hannover des NDR / Werner Andreas Albert (conductor) – cpo 999939-2 (3 CDs)
