= Königskinder =

- Märchenoper by Engelbert Humperdinck
- Geraldine Farrar as the Goose-Girl in the premiere
- Translation: The King's Children
- Librettist: Else Bernstein-Porges
- Language: German
- Based on: fairy-tale
- Premiere: 28 December 1910; Metropolitan Opera, New York City

Königskinder (German for King's Children or “Royal Children”) is a stage work by Engelbert Humperdinck that exists in two versions: as a melodrama and as an opera or more precisely a Märchenoper. The libretto was written by Ernst Rosmer (pen name of Else Bernstein-Porges), adapted from her play of the same name.

In 1894, Heinrich Porges asked Humperdinck to write incidental music for his daughter Else's play. Humperdinck was interested in making the story into an opera but since Else Bernstein-Porges initially refused, he opted for the play to be staged as a melodrama – that is with spoken dialogue taking place along with an instrumental backdrop. (The work also included operatic arias and choruses, as well as unaccompanied dialogue.)

In the melodramatic passages, Humperdinck designed an innovative hybrid notation that called for a text delivery somewhere between singing and speech. With this notation, the singer was expected to deliver a substantial portion of the text with approximate pitched melodies. This version was first staged at the Munich Hoftheater, with Hedwig Schako as the goose girl, on 23 January 1897 and enjoyed some success. However, Else Bernstein-Porges finally relented in 1907 and agreed that Humperdinck could transform the work into an opera.

== Performance history ==
Königskinder was first performed at the Metropolitan Opera in New York on 28 December 1910, conducted by Alfred Hertz, with Geraldine Farrar as the Goose-Girl, Herman Jadlowker as the King's Son, Louise Homer as the Witch and Otto Goritz as the Fiddler. Farrar trained her own flock of geese in preparation for the role; according to a New-York Tribune review of the first performance, "Miss Farrar caused 'much amusement' by appearing before the curtain with a live goose under her arm."

A Berlin premiere followed on 14 January 1911, conducted by Leo Blech with Lola Artôt de Padilla as the Goose-Girl and Walter Kirchhoff as the King's Son. Though the work lay in the shadow of its "sister" fairy-tale work Hänsel und Gretel for many years, it has been regularly revived in Germany, and with increasing frequency abroad since 1986 (Wexford Festival). Other notable productions include the 1992 English National Opera, directed by David Pountney and conducted by Sir Mark Elder; a 1997 staging at Sarasota Opera; from 2005 to 2007 at the Bavarian State Opera; and in 2007 at the Zürich Opera House. In 2010, dell'Arte Opera Ensemble gave a performance celebrating the hundredth anniversary of its premiere in New York City. A production by Christof Loy with Olga Kulchynska (Gänsemagd) and Daniel Behle (Königssohn), conducted by Marc Albrecht, was performed in October 2022 at the Dutch National Opera in Amsterdam. It has also been frequently recorded.

== Roles ==
Roles, voice types, premiere cast
| Role | Voice type | Premiere cast, 28 December 1910 Conductor: Alfred Hertz |
|---|---|---|
| Goose-Girl (Gänsemagd) | soprano | Geraldine Farrar |
| Witch (Hexe) | contralto | Louise Homer |
| King's son (Königssohn) | tenor | Herman Jadlowker |
| Fiddler (Spielmann) | baritone | Otto Goritz |
| Woodcutter | bass | Adamo Didur |
| Broom-maker | tenor | Albert Reiss |
| Stable girl | contralto | Marie Mattfeld |
| Innkeeper's daughter | mezzo-soprano | Florence Wickham |
| First gatekeeper | tenor | Ernst Maran |
| Second gatekeeper | baritone | William Hinshaw |
| Innkeeper | bass | Antonio Pini-Corsi |
| First child | soprano | Edna Walter |
| Second child | soprano | Lotte Engel |
| Senior councillor | baritone | Marcel Reiner |
| Tailor | tenor | Julius Bayer |

== Synopsis ==
=== Act 1 ===
The scene plays in a sunny meadow outside a rustic little hut, in the hills above a town called Hellabrunn. In the distance we can see a mountain, the Hellagebirge. Twelve geese are milling around, splashing in the pond, nibbling at grass; the Goose-Girl is lying face down and aimlessly kicking the earth. The Witch calls from the hut to scold the Goose-Girl. The Witch lives here in this remote location because she hates human society; through magic she keeps the Girl here as her slave, although the Goose-Girl longs for sunshine and human contact. The Witch compels her, very much against her will, to bake a magic loaf of bread. It will not grow hard or stale, but it will kill anyone who eats just half of it. The Witch then takes her basket and heads off for the swamp, to gather more poisonous snakes, worms, and creepy-crawlies.

The Goose-Girl is staring at her reflection in the stream when a young man enters from the direction of the mountains. This character, the King's Son, has left his father's castle and is travelling incognito, disguised as a simple huntsman, in search of adventure. In an extended scene he falls in love with the Goose-Girl; they kiss, and her wreath of flowers blows away. He offers her a crown instead. But she says it's too much for her, so he throws it down on the grass and begs her to run off with him. She says she will go; but she cannot break the spell which keeps her prisoner in the Witch's domain, and does not know how to explain her situation to the King's Son. Finally he grows angry and storms off, vowing that she will not see him again—not until a star has fallen into a lily growing on her lawn.

Hearing the Witch returning, the Goose-Girl hides the crown left behind by the King's Son. But the Witch figures out what has happened, and casts another magic spell to prevent the Goose-Girl's escape. They hear the offstage voice of the Fiddler, and the Witch drags the Goose-Girl inside.

Enter the Fiddler, followed by the Woodcutter and the Broom-maker, emissaries from the nearby town who have come to parley with the Witch. (Self-referential moment: when the Broom-maker knocks at the door and asks the Witch if she would like to buy a broom, we hear the "Broom" motif from Humperdinck's Hansel and Gretel.) After much hemming and hawing from the Woodcutter and Broom-maker, the Fiddler explains why they are there: the city fathers, proud of their wealth and affluence, want the wise woman to identify a king to lead them. The Witch foretells that the first person, be it man or woman, to enter the town gates when the bells toll noon the following day must be their next king. "Though he be clad like a clown, he is worthy to wear the crown." Happy with this prophecy, the Broom-maker and Woodcutter return to town. The Fiddler, however, has glimpsed the Goose-Girl through the window, and stays behind.

As the sun sets, the Fiddler confronts the Witch about the Goose-Girl. The Goose-Girl complains to the Fiddler that she is prisoner to the Witch's magic, and even tells him about the prince who came calling that afternoon. The Fiddler immediately proposes that the Goose-Girl should marry the King's Son and come rule over his town. The Witch objects that the Goose-Girl is not noble-born. She tells the grim story of the Goose-Girl's parents: a greedy young lord sought the love of the hangman's daughter. Her boyfriend murdered him, then impregnated the daughter the night before he was executed—by her father, of course. The Goose-Girl is aghast, but the Fiddler comforts her: he knew her parents, he says, and their love and sufferings made them noble indeed; she is indeed a Königskind, a kingly child. The Goose-Girl cheers up and vows to win the King's Son. One of her geese brings her the golden crown; she tears off the shawl she has been wearing, revealing a head of glorious golden hair, prays to her parents for help, and suddenly a star falls down from the starry sky and into the lily, which glows. "Redeemed!" the Goose-Girl cries, and rushes away, followed by the Fiddler and her flock of geese.

=== Act 2 ===
In the central square of the town, just outside the inn, the people are in a turmoil of excitement, eager to welcome their new ruler. The Stable-Girl is scolded by the Innkeeper's Daughter. The King's Son enters, stretching; the Stable-Girl let him sleep in the pigsty last night, and although he is a bit of a mess the Innkeeper's Daughter takes a great liking to him. She offers him food and drink, and even a tumble in the hay, but he is repulsed by her, and compares her unfavorably to the Goose-Girl he met the day before. He overcomes disappointment and dismay and renews his commitment to a year of wandering and learning, which he hopes will make him a worthy ruler. While the crowd gathers and the young people dance to music, the King's Son speaks with the Innkeeper and gets a job tending his swine.

More people assemble, including the Woodcutter, the Broom-maker, and his thirteen daughters. The youngest daughter tries to sell the King's Son a broom; he does not have any money, but he plays Ring-Around-the-Rosy with her. She runs away from him once the town council are all assembled. The Woodcutter, considerably embellishing the story of his trip to the Witch, announces that their king will enter the town at noon, drawn in a golden chariot. The King's Son challenges his superficial description of a king: "Could you even recognize a true king, if he was not nicely dressed? Do you just want a puppet, a figurehead?" Questioning the town's wisdom fails to make him popular. The Innkeeper's Daughter accuses him of not paying for the food she gave him, everyone starts calling him a thief, and a great melée threatens.

But just at that moment the bells toll midday. The great gates of the town swing open. Enter the Goose-Girl, accompanied by the Fiddler (and her geese). She wears the golden crown, and greets the King's Son with delight. He falls to her knees and calls her his queen. The townspeople mock and object to this in a noisy ensemble, the Fiddler struggling to be heard as he insists these are their destined rulers. The people grab sticks and stones and drive the young beggar and the Goose-Girl out of town. When all is quiet again, an Old Councilor asks the Broom-maker's little Daughter why she is crying: "That was the King and his wife!" she sings.

=== Act 3 ===
Winter has come. We are back at the location from act 1, only now the Witch's hut is dilapidated, its windows broken as if by thrown stones. The Witch was burned at the stake because the townspeople did not like her prophecy about the ruler. They maimed and imprisoned the Fiddler, who is now living in the hut and tending the birds. He comes outside and feeds a flock of doves, then asks whether, in their flight, they have seen anything of the Goose-Girl and the King's Son. "I am growing old with waiting and sadness," he sings.

The Woodcutter and Broom-maker enter, accompanied by a crowd of children. They have come to fetch the Fiddler back to town. He swore he would never return there, but the Broom-maker says they need him: everything has gone to pieces in town; the children do not trust the adults, and there is conspiracy and mutiny everywhere. The Innkeeper's little Daughter shoves them away and addresses the Fiddler directly: the children, she says, know he was right and their parents were wrong; the King's Son and the Goose-Girl belong on the throne. She asks them to lead a search for the royal couple, and he does so, singing a sweet lullaby which is drowned out by the sound of the snow and wind. The Fiddler and the children disappear into the snowy mountains while the Woodcutter and Broom-maker try to warm themselves inside the hut.

Enter the King's Son, carrying the exhausted Goose-Girl. Worn out with wandering, they knock at the hut and beg for food and shelter; the Woodcutter slams the window on them. They sing of the cave where they were living, up in the mountains, and the various steps along the journey that has led them to this place. The Goose-Girl tries to cheer the King's Son up with merry song and dance, but she collapses. She seems to be near death. He again pounds on the door and asks the Woodcutter and Broom-maker for food, offering them even his crown. They found a loaf of bread in the hut, and the King's Son splits it with the Goose-Girl; but it is the magic bread of death baked in the first scene. The King's Son and the Goose-Girl both die, locked in each other's arms, singing of their love. The Fiddler and the children return too late; they lay the youthful lovers on a bier and carry them away, to bury them on a high crag, where the Fiddler promises to sing the song of the Kingly Children.

== Recordings ==
- 1952: Käthe Möller-Siepermann (Goose-Girl), Ilsa Ihme-Säbisch (Witch), Peter Anders (King's Son), Dietrich Fischer-Dieskau (Fiddler), WDR Symphony Orchestra Cologne, conducted by Richard Kraus, live in Cologne, Walhall
- 1976: Helen Donath / Hanna Schwarz / Adolf Dallapozza / Hermann Prey, Münchner Rundfunkorchester, conducted by Heinz Wallberg, EMI (released on CD in 1989)
- 1996: Dagmar Schellenberger / Marilyn Schmiege / Thomas Moser / Dietrich Henschel, Münchner Rundfunkorchester, conducted by Fabio Luisi, Calig
- 2005: Ofelia Sala / Nora Gubisch / Jonas Kaufmann / Detlef Roth, Orchestre national de Montpellier Languedoc-Roussillon, conducted by Armin Jordan, live in Montpellier, Accord
- 2007: Isabel Rey / Liliana Nikiteanu / Jonas Kaufmann / Oliver Widmer, Opernhaus Zürich, conducted by Ingo Metzmacher, videorecording from Zurich, Encore
- 2008: Juliane Banse / Gabriele Schnaut / Klaus Florian Vogt / Christian Gerhaher, Deutsches Symphonie-Orchester Berlin, conducted by Ingo Metzmacher, live in Berlin, Premiere Opera (also released Crystal Classics : Deutschlandradio Kultur, 2011)
