= Der Widerspänstigen Zähmung =

Opera by Hermann Goetz

Der Widerspänstigen Zähmung (also: Der Widerspenstigen Zähmung) (English: The Taming of the Shrew) is a German-language comic opera in four acts by the German composer Hermann Goetz. It was written between 1868 and 1872 and first performed at the National Theatre Mannheim on 11 October 1874 under the conductor Ernst Frank. The libretto, by Joseph Victor Widmann and the composer, is based on Shakespeare's The Taming of the Shrew. The style of the opera shows Goetz turning away from the musical ideas of Richard Wagner towards the classicism of Mozart. Der Widerspänstigen Zähmung was a huge success, not only in Germany but in the United States and in Great Britain, where it received high praise from George Bernard Shaw.

== Roles ==
Roles, voice types, premiere cast
Role	Voice type	Premiere cast, October 11, 1874 Conductor: Ernst Frank
Baptista, a rich gentleman of Padua	bass	Karl Ditt
Katharine, Baptista's daughter	soprano	Ottilie Ottiker
Bianka (Bianca), Baptista's daughter	soprano	Ida Auer-Herbeck
Petruchio, a gentleman from Verona	baritone	Eduard Schlosser
Grumio, Petruchio's servant	bass	
Lucentio, Bianca's suitor	tenor	Carl Slovak
Hortensio, Bianca's suitor	baritone	August Knapp
Hortensio's wife	mezzo-soprano	
A tailor	tenor	

== Recordings ==
- 1944: Sächsische Staatsoper Dresden chorus and orchestra, conducted by Karl Elmendorff (Urania)
- 2007: Bayerischer Rundfunk chorus and orchestra, conducted by Joseph Keilberth (Profil)
