= Teatro Grattacielo =

Opera company in New York City

- Company logo
- Formation: 1994
- Founder: Duane Printz
- Type: opera company
- Location: New York City
- Artistic director: Stefanos Koroneos
- Website: grattacielo.org

Teatro Grattacielo is a professional opera company based in New York City specializing in concert performances of rarely heard verismo operas. The company's past performances have included the North American premieres of Mascagni's Il piccolo Marat and Riccardo Zandonai's I cavalieri di Ekebù and La farsa amorosa. Its name means "Skyscraper Theatre" in Italian, a reference not only to the New York skyline but also to the Teatro Grattacielo in Genoa, a cinema which was the city's temporary opera house while the Teatro Carlo Felice was rebuilt after extensive damage in World War II.

== Company history ==
Teatro Grattacielo was founded in 1994 by the former soprano and voice teacher, Duane Printz. The company gave its first performance in 1997 – Italo Montemezzi's L'amore dei tre re. Most of its performances have taken place in the Alice Tully Hall, although other venues were used while the hall underwent renovation between 2006 and 2009 and in recent years the company performs at the Rose Theater at Jazz at Lincoln Center and at the Gerald W. Lynch Theater.

Teatro Grattacielo's Honorary Director is Jolanda Tarquinia Zandonai, the daughter of composer Riccardo Zandonai. Notable singers who have appeared with the company include Lando Bartolini (who sang Giannetto in La cena delle beffe and the title role in Guglielmo Ratcliff) and Aprile Millo (who sang the title role in Zazà). Bartolini also served on the company's Advisory Board.

On May 24, 2011, the company performed Umberto Giordano's last opera, Il re (1929), as well as I Compagnacci (1923) of composer Primo Riccitelli. The 2012 performance featured the epic opera La Nave by Italo Montemezzi, which was written in 1918, and not seen internationally since 1938. In the United States, La Nave was last performed in Chicago in 1919, conducted by the composer.

In 2019, Stefanos Koroneos was appointed new artistic and general director of the company.

=== Performance history ===
- L'amore dei tre re (Italo Montemezzi) 26 March 1997
- Iris (Pietro Mascagni) 23 November 1998
- L'arlesiana (Francesco Cilea) 15 November 1999
- I cavalieri di Ekebù (Riccardo Zandonai) 20 November 2000 – North American premiere
- Risurrezione (Franco Alfano) 30 November 2001
- La Wally (Alfredo Catalani) 18 November 2002
- Guglielmo Ratcliff (Pietro Mascagni) 25 November 2003
- La cena delle beffe (Umberto Giordano) 20 November 2004
- Zazà (Ruggero Leoncavallo) 12 November 2005
- La farsa amorosa (Riccardo Zandonai) 11 November 2006 – North American premiere
- L'incantesimo (Italo Montemezzi) and L'oracolo (Franco Leoni) 13 November 2007
- Il piccolo Marat (Pietro Mascagni) 13 April 2009 – North American premiere
- I gioielli della Madonna (Ermanno Wolf-Ferrari) 24 May 2010
- I Compagnacci (Primo Riccitelli) with Il re (Umberto Giordano) 24 May 2011
- La nave (Italo Montemezzi) 29 October 2012
- Sakùntala (Franco Alfano) 19 November 2013
- Twentieth Anniversary Concert – 18 November 2014
- Siberia (Umberto Giordano) 24 October 2015
- Cassandra (Vittorio Gnecchi) 8 October 2016
- Il grillo del focolare 14 October 2017 (New York premiere)
- Gloria (Francesco Cilea) 29 September 2018 (New York premiere)
