= Sándor Svéd =

Hungarian singer (died 1979)

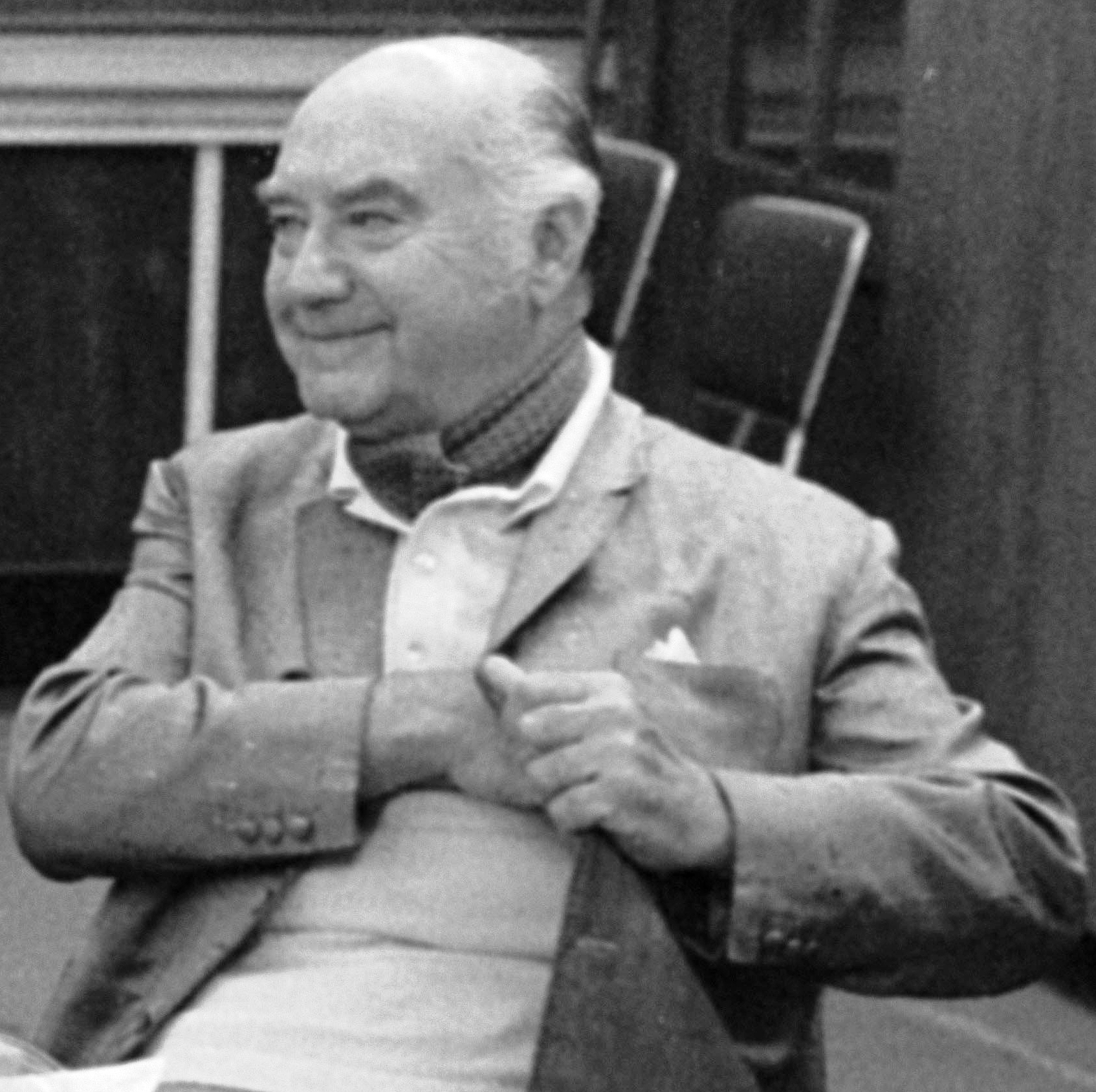
Sándor Svéd (1969)

Sándor Svéd (28 May 1906, Budapest — 9 June 1979), also known as Alexander Sved in the United States, was a Hungarian baritone who had an active international career in operas and concerts from 1928 until his retirement from the stage in 1958. He performed lead roles at several important opera houses, including the Metropolitan Opera, the Vienna State Opera, and the Royal Opera House, Covent Garden. In 1943 he performed the role of Folco in the world premiere of Italo Montemezzi's L'incantesimo. He made several recordings during his career, both on record and on radio; including multiple performances for the Metropolitan Opera radio broadcasts.

== Life and career ==
Born Sándor Svéd in Budapest, Hungary, Svéd was trained as a violinist at the Franz Liszt Academy of Music. After graduating he pursued vocal training in Milan with baritones Mario Sammarco and Riccardo Stracciari. He later studied singing with Estelle Liebling in New York City.

Svéd made his professional debut at the Hungarian State Opera House in 1928 as the Count di Luna in Giuseppe Verdi's Il trovatore. From 1935 through 1939 he was a resident artist at the Vienna State Opera under Bruno Walter where he achieved an international reputation for heroic roles in the Italian repertory; including the part of the Marquis of Posa in Don Carlo. At that house he had a major critical triumph in 1938 as Amonasro in Aida under the baton of Victor de Sabata. Outside of the Italian repertory, he also appeared in Vienna as Escamillo in Carmen, Hans Sachs in Die Meistersinger von Nürnberg, Lysiart in Euryanthe, Wolfram in Tannhäuser, and the title role in Eugene Onegin.

In 1936 Sved made several appearances at the Royal Opera House, Covent Garden where he was positively received in the roles of Scarpia in Tosca, Amonasro, and the title role in Rigoletto. On December 2, 1940, he made his debut at the Metropolitan Opera ("the Met") in New York City using the name Alexander Sved as Renato in Un ballo in maschera. He remained committed to the Met for the next ten years, performing the roles of Alfio in Cavalleria rusticana, Amonasro, Barnaba in La Gioconda, the Count Di Luna, Escamillo, Iago in Otello, Michele in Il tabarro, Telramund in Lohengrin, Wolfram, and the title role in Simon Boccanegra. His final appearance with the Met was on tour to Chicago as Scarpia on May 8, 1950.

In 1943 Svéd performed the role of Folco in the world premiere Italo Montemezzi's L'incantesimo with NBC Symphony Orchestra and soprano Vivian Della Chiesa for a broadcast of the work on NBC Radio. Montemezzi conducted the performance.

In the 1950s Svéd performed in operas in Rome, Paris, and at the Bayreuth Festival. During his career he also toured as a concert singer, and made multiple appearances with the Hungarian State Opera House. At the Teatro Comunale, Florence he performed the roles of Simon Boccanegra and Rossini's Guglielmo Tell. He performed the latter role at the end of his stage career in 1958 at the Vienna Volksoper.

In 1956 Svéd relocated to Stuttgart where he worked as a voice teacher after ceasing performing in the late 1950s.

Svéd died on June 9, 1979, in Budapest, Hungary.
