= Virgilio Lazzari =

Italian opera singer (1887–1953)

Signed photograph of Virgilio Lazzari, 1919

Virgilio Lazzari (20 April 1887 – 4 October 1953) was an Italian operatic bass who had an active international performance career from 1908 to 1953. He had lengthy associations with the Chicago Civic Opera (1918–1932) and the Metropolitan Opera (1933–1950), and frequently performed at the Salzburg Festival during the 1930s. He appeared as a guest artist with opera houses internationally, including the Royal Opera House, the Teatro Colón, and the Teatro Carlo Felice, among others.

Lazzari was particularly known for his performances of Archibaldo in L'amore dei tre re and Leporello in Don Giovanni. In 1943, he created the role of Salomone in the world premiere of Italo Montemezzi's L'incantesimo. Music critic Harold Rosenthal stated that Lazzari was "one of the best singing actors in his particular repertory". While working in Chicago he became a naturalized citizen of the United States. His voice is preserved on complete recordings of Verdi's Rigoletto and Mozart's Don Giovanni which he made with the Metropolitan Opera.

== Life and career ==
Born in Assisi, Lazzari began his career performing with the Vitale Operetta Company from 1908 to 1911; making his professional debut as L'Incognito in Franz von Suppé's Boccaccio. He then pursued studies in opera with Antonio Cotogni in Rome before making his first appearance in that city in 1914 at the Teatro Costanzi. He was committed to the Teatro Colón in Buenos Aires for the 1914–1915 season, and appeared at the Municipal Theatre of Santiago in 1915 as Aldobrandino dei Rangoni in Mascagni's Parisina.

In 1916 Lazzari performed the role of Archibaldo in L'amore dei tre re at the Palacio de Bellas Artes in Mexico City and gave his first appearance in North America in Saint Louis. In 1917 he was committed to the Boston Opera House, and made his New York City debut performing Colline in Giacomo Puccini's La bohème with Maggie Teyte as Mimi and Luca Botta as Rodolfo at Columbia University to an audience of 2,000 people.

Lazzari was a principal artist with the Chicago Opera Association (COA) and the Chicago Civic Opera (CCO) from 1918 to 1932. He had earlier portrayed Ramfis in the Chicago premiere of Verdi's Aida with Rosa Raisa in the title role at the Auditorium Building, Chicago, in 1916; a role which he repeated for the grand opening of the Civic Opera House in Chicago in 1919. With the COA he sang Archibaldo to Mary Garden's Fiora in 1920. He performed in several operas opposite Amelita Galli-Curci in Chicago, including Count Rodolfo to Galli-Curci's Amina in Vincenzo Bellini's La sonnambula in 1921. He also performed the role of Claudius in the Chicago premiere of Ambroise Thomas's Hamlet in 1921. In 1925 he performed the role of Don Basilio in Gioachino Rossini's The Barber of Seville in Paris, and performed the role of Archibaldo to Lucrezia Bori's Fiora at the Ravinia Festival with the Chicago Symphony Orchestra. Other opera roles he sang in Chicago included Sparafucile in Verdi's Rigoletto, Raimondo Bidebent in Donizetti's Lucia di Lammermoor, Plunkett in Flotow's Martha, Figaro in The Marriage of Figaro, and the title role in Boito's Mefistofele among others.

From 1933 to 1950 Lazzari was a leading bass at the Metropolitan Opera in New York City. He made his debut at the Metropolitan Opera House on 28 December 1933, as Don Pedro in L'Africaine. Other roles he sang at the Met included Alvise in La Gioconda, Archibaldo, Colline, Count Rodolfo, Don Basilio, Dr. Bartolo in Mozart's The Marriage of Figaro, Ferrando in Verdi's Il trovatore, Leporello, Lothario in Mignon by Ambroise Thomas, Oroveso in Bellini's Norma, the Prefect in Linda di Chamounix, Raimondo Bidebent, Ramfis, Samuel in Verdi's Un ballo in maschera, Simone in Puccini's Gianni Schicchi, Sparafucile, Talpa in Puccini's Il tabarro, and Varlaam in Mussorgsky's Boris Godunov. His final performance at the Met was as Leporello to Paolo Silveri's Don Giovanni on 5 December 1950.

Lazzari appeared annually at the Salzburg Festival from 1934 to 1939; portraying such roles as Bartolo in The Barber of Seville, Leporello in Don Giovanni, and Pistola in Falstaff. He made his debut at the Royal Opera House in London in 1939 as Leporello in Don Giovanni. In 1943 he sang the role of Salomone in the world premiere of Italo Montemezzi's L'incantesimo on a radio broadcast with the NBC Symphony Orchestra. One of his final appearances was as Archibaldo at the Teatro Carlo Felice in 1953.

Lazzari died on 4 October 1953 at his home in Castel Gandolfo when he was 66 years old.

== Recordings ==
- Wolfgang Amadeus Mozart, Don Giovanni, Metropolitan Opera Orchestra and Chorus, conducted by Tullio Serafin, Ezio Pinza, Virgilio Lazzari, Rosa Ponselle (1934, Andromeda)
- Giuseppe Verdi, Rigoletto, Metropolitan Opera Orchestra and Chorus, conducted by Ettore Panizza, Lawrence Tibbett, Frederick Jagel, Jan Kiepura, Lily Pons, Virgilio Lazzari (1935, Naxos Records)
