= Primo Riccitelli =

Italian composer

Primo Riccitelli (9 August 1875 – 27 March 1941), was an Italian composer.

One of six children, he was born in the village of Cognoli, Campli in the Abruzzo region of Italy. His father, Giuseppe, was a small landowner and his mother, Maria Maiaroli, a homemaker. The one-day-old infant was baptized at the local parish hall of Molviano with the first name Pancrazio. He would later perform under the stage name, Primo Riccitelli.

Primo Riccitelli began his studies in the town of Teramo and then transferred to the Rossini Conservatory in Pesaro where he soon became the protégé of Pietro Mascagni. He is perhaps best remembered for two operas, I Compagnacci and Madonna Oretta. Lesser known compositions include Madonnetta, Francesca da Rimini, Lory, Nena; Heremos, Suora Maddalena and Maria sul Monte. The one-act opera I Compagnacci was performed in Rome and at the Metropolitan Opera House in New York City, and was performed in concert by Teatro Grattacielo in New York City in 2011. All traces of several other of Primo Riccitelli's operas have been lost.

After a brief illness, Riccitelli died on 27 March 1941 in Giulianova where he is now buried. A street in the town of Teramo bears his name. Also carrying the name of this composer is a musical and theater society headquartered in Teramo and performing in Bellante. In April 2006, a bronze statue was dedicated to Riccitelli at the entrance to the cemetery in the small village of Sant'Onofrio, near his birthplace.

== Sources ==
- D. Taylor & R. Kerr (eds.), The Biographical Dictionary of Musicians, New York (1940).
- Raffaele Aurini, Dizionario Bibliografico della gente D'Abruzzo, Teramo, 1973, volume V;
- Dizionario Bibliografico della gente D'Abruzzo, 2° edizione, a cura di Fausto Eugeni, Luigi Ponziani e Marcello Sgattoni, Colledara, 2002, Andromeda Editrice, vol. 5, pp. 106–114;
- Fernando Aurini, I Compagnacci, Teramo, Fondazione Cassa di Risparmio della Provincia di Teramo, November 1999;
