= La cena delle beffe =

Italian opera by Umberto Giordano

- Opera by Umberto Giordano
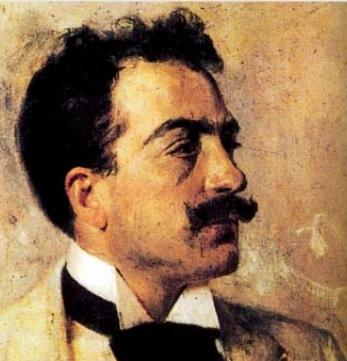
- The opera's composer, Umberto Giordano
- Librettist: Sem Benelli
- Premiere: 20 December 1924; La Scala, Milan

La cena delle beffe (The Jesters' Supper) is an opera in four acts composed by Umberto Giordano to an Italian libretto by Sem Benelli adapted from his 1909 play of the same name. The opera premiered on 20 December 1924 at La Scala. Milan. The story, set in Florence at the time of Lorenzo de' Medici, recounts the rivalry between Giannetto Malespini and Neri Chiaramantesi for the affections of the beautiful Ginevra and Giannetto's thirst for revenge over a cruel joke played on him by Neri and his brother Gabriello. Giannetto's revenge "joke" ultimately leads Neri to murder both Ginevra and (by mistake) his own brother. The opera ends with Neri's descent into madness.

== Composition history ==
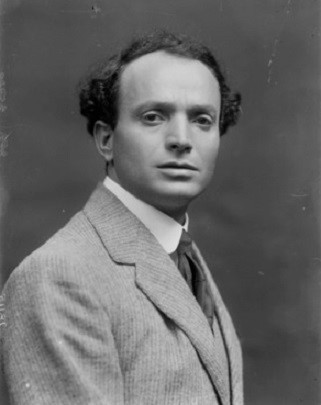
The opera's librettist Sem Benelli

The libretto for Giordano's opera was adapted by the Italian playwright and poet, Sem Benelli, from his verse play, La cena delle beffe. Described as a poema drammatico (dramatic poem), it premiered in 1909 at the Teatro Argentina in Rome with original music composed by 14-year-old Manoah Leide-Tedesco. Like several other works by Benelli it is written in neo-romantic florid verse, with an historical setting and a melodramatic, violent plot. Benelli's play was an immediate and extraordinary success in Italy. At one time it was being performed simultaneously by four different Italian touring companies, and remains in the repertoire today. A version of the play adapted by Jean Richepin and titled La beffa (The Joke), was performed in Paris in 1910 with Sarah Bernhardt playing the role of Giannetto. It ran for 21 performances, but her plan to present the play in New York later that year had to be abandoned when the wrong sets were shipped from Paris. Considerably more successful was the 1919 English adaptation by Edward Sheldon, The Jest, starring John Barrymore as Giannetto Malespini and Lionel Barrymore as Neri Chiaramantesi, which ran for 256 performances at the Plymouth Theatre in New York City.

Giordano approached Benelli in 1917 to propose setting the play as an opera. Benelli initially refused as the composer Tommaso Montefiore had obtained the right to compose a work based on the play in 1910, although by 1917, he had still not begun work on it. After lengthy negotiations via Giordano's publisher, Casa Sonzogno, Giordano finally obtained the rights to compose the opera on 15 September 1923. Benelli himself adapted his play for the libretto.

== Performance history ==
La cena delle beffe premiered in Milan on 20 December 1924 at La Scala in a performance directed by Giovacchino Forzano and conducted by Arturo Toscanini, with Carmen Melis as Ginevra and Hipólito Lázaro as Giannetto. The sets and costumes were designed by Galileo Chini, who had also designed the premiere production of Benelli's original play in 1909.

The opening night was a triumphal success with the conductor and cast taking 24 curtain calls. and this success at La Scala led to performances throughout Italy and abroad. The following year La cena delle beffe had its first performances at La Fenice and the Teatro Comunale di Bologna. Its US premiere was at the Metropolitan Opera on 2 January 1926 with a stellar cast that included Frances Alda as Ginevra, Beniamino Gigli as Giannetto, and Titta Ruffo as Neri.

By 1930, the opera had been seen in more than 40 cities around the world. However, it only ran for 12 performances over two seasons at the Met, and performances after 1930 have become sporadic although the opera has never completely dropped out of the repertoire. It had major revivals in 1987 at Wexford Festival Opera and in 1999 at Zurich Opera and the Teatro Comunale di Bologna in a production directed by Liliana Cavani. It also received a concert performance by Teatro Grattacielo at Alice Tully Hall in 2004. In 2016, it received a new production at the Teatro alla Scala in Milan.

The 1942 film The Jester's Supper is an adaptation of Benelli's original play, rather than the opera.

== Roles ==
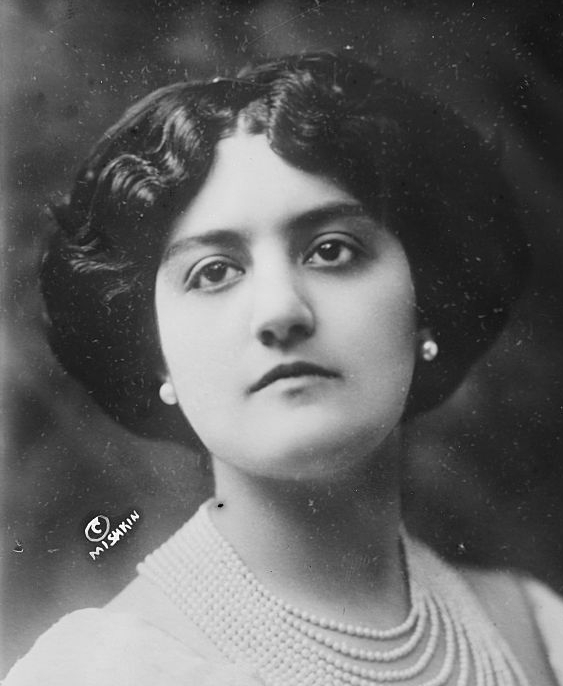
Carmen Melis, who created the role of Ginevra

Roles, voice types, premiere cast
Role	Voice type	Premiere cast, 20 December 1924 Conductor: Arturo Toscanini
Ginevra	soprano	Carmen Melis
Giannetto Malaspini	tenor	Hipólito Lázaro
Neri Chiaramantesi	baritone	Benvenuto Franci
Gabriello Chiaramantesi	tenor	Emilio Venturini
Tornaquinci	bass	Fernando Autori
Calandra	bass	Giuseppe Menni
Fazio	baritone	Aristide Baracchi
Cintia	mezzo-soprano	Gina Pedroni
Lapo	tenor	Palmiro Domenichetti
Doctor	baritone	Ernesto Badini
Trinca	tenor	Francesco Dominici
Laldomine	mezzo-soprano	Cesira Ferrani
Fiammetta	soprano	Lina Lanza
Lisabetta	soprano	Cesarina (Cesira) Valobra
Singer	tenor	Alfredo Tedeschi
Servants of Tornaquinci and the Medici

== Synopsis ==
Poster by Galileo Chini for Benelli's 1909 play, La cena delle beffe. The same image was used for the posters advertising Giordano's opera in 1924.

Place: Florence
Time: Lorenzo de' Medici's time

=== Act 1 ===
Lorenzo de' Medici has ordered Tornaquinci to host a dinner at his house to make peace between Giannetto Malespini and the Chiaramantesi brothers, Neri and Gabriello. Neri had taken Giannetto's mistress, Ginevra, for himself, and as a "joke", both he and his brother had tormented Giannetto by putting him into a sack, pricking him with their swords, and throwing him into the Arno river. Bent on vengeance, Giannetto convinces Neri, who has become drunk at Tornaquinci's dinner, to dress in his full armour and seek out a fight in an unsalubrious quarter of Florence. After rumours spread by Giannetto's servant, Neri is branded as a mad man and is locked up for the night, while Giannetto spends the night with Ginevra, who in the darkness believes him to be Neri.

=== Act 2 ===
In Ginevra's house the next morning, she learns who her real lover had been the previous night. She is pleased rather than appalled, regretting only that she did not know it at the time as it would have made the tryst all the more exciting. Neri bursts in and is enraged by both Ginevra's reaction and Giannetto's perfidy. The Medici servants enter and drag Neri off again.

=== Act 3 ===
Neri is tied up in the Medici cellars. Giannetto and a doctor pretend to treat him for his madness by bringing in several people whom he has wronged in the past to taunt him. Lisabetta, one of the women Neri had wronged, is still in love with him and feels pity for him. When the others leave, she urges him to act truly mad, whereupon she will ask for him to be released into her custody. Giannetto returns and is horrified to see that he has actually driven Neri mad. He begs Neri's forgiveness, but Neri continues to behave like a madman and ignores him. Giannetto decides to continue with his revenge by telling Neri that he will once again sleep with Ginevra that night.

=== Act 4 ===
In her house, Ginevra awaits another tryst with Giannetto. Unbeknownst to her, Giannetto has told Gabriello that Ginevra loves him and is waiting for him that night. Neri, now freed from the Medici cellars, bursts into Ginevra's bedroom and stabs both Ginevra and the man he believes to be Giannetto to death. He then encounters Giannetto waiting for him outside the room. Neri now realizes that Giannetto's last "joke" has led him to killing his own brother. He rushes back into the bedroom and emerges now genuinely insane and calling out for Lisabetta. Giannetto's revenge is now complete, but tormented by what he has done, he takes no pleasure in his victory.

== Recordings ==
There are no complete studio recordings of the work. Remastered recordings of live performances released on CD include:.

- Oliviero De Fabritiis (conductor), Orchestra Sinfonica di Milano della RAI, with Antonio Annaloro as Giannetto, Gigliola Frazzoni as Ginevra, and Anselmo Colzani as Neri. Live recording of a radio performance in Milan, 1956. Label: Myto CD
- Nino Bonavolontà (conductor), RAI Orchestra & Chorus, Milan, with Giangiacomo Guelfi, Amedeo Zambon, Anna Maria Rosati, Plino Clabassi, and Alfredo Mariotti. Live performance, December 5, 1972, Opera d'Oro, OPD 1478
- Gian Paolo Sanzogno (conductor), Orchestra Sinfonica di Piacenza, with Fabio Armiliato as Giannetto, Rita Lantieri as Ginevra, and Marco Chingari as Neri. Live recording of a stage performance in Piacenza, 1988. Label: Bongiovanni CD
