= Riccitelli =

Riccitelli is an Italian surname. Notable people with the surname include:

- Alessandro Riccitelli (born 1965), Italian figure skater
- Primo Riccitelli (1875–1941), Italian composer
- Ricky Riccitelli (born 1995), New Zealand rugby union player
