= Daniela Dessì =

Italian operatic soprano (1957–2016)

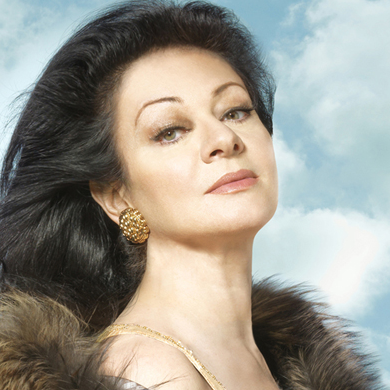
Dessì in 2009

Daniela Dessì (14 May 1957 – 20 August 2016) was an Italian operatic soprano.

== Life and career ==
Born in Genoa, Italy, Dessì completed her studies at the Arrigo Boito Conservatory in Parma and the Accademia Musicale Chigiana in Siena. She made her operatic debut on 7 December 1978 at Sanremo Casino's theatre as Serpina in La serva padrona by Pergolesi during the season of Savona's Teatro dell'Opera Giocosa.

In 1980, she distinguished herself as a finalist at the Maria Callas International Competition organized by Italy's RAI TV. Her international career took her to a variety of opera theatres, singing under the direction of conductors such as Riccardo Muti, Claudio Abbado, and the Metropolitan Opera's James Levine.

Dessì's 2008–2009 season began with Tosca in Florence, where she performed an encore of "Vissi d'arte", the first encore at Teatro Comunale di Firenze since Renata Tebaldi's "Amami Alfredo" in 1956. She later performed at the Verdi Theatre in Trieste, and also performed Adriana Lecouvreur in Palermo, Puccini's La fanciulla del West in Seville, Manon Lescaut in Warsaw, Madama Butterfly in Hanover, and Aida in Verona and Cagliari. She closed the season in Barcelona with Turandot. In January 2009, she opened the season of recital at La Scala.

Dessì's partner was the Italian tenor Fabio Armiliato, with whom she frequently performed and recorded. She died of colon cancer at Poliambulanza Hospital in Brescia on 20 August 2016, at age 59.

== Repertoire ==
Giuseppe Verdi

- Ernani, Elvira
- Luisa Miller, Luisa
- Rigoletto, Gilda
- Il trovatore, Leonora
- La traviata, Violetta
- I Vespri Siciliani, Elena
- Simon Boccanegra, Amelia
- Un ballo in maschera, Amelia
- La forza del destino, Leonora
- Don Carlos, Elisabetta
- Aida, Aida
- Otello, Desdemona
- Falstaff, Alice

Giacomo Puccini

- Manon Lescaut, Manon
- La bohème, Mimì
- Tosca, Tosca
- Madama Butterfly, Cio-Cio-San
- La fanciulla del West, Minnie
- Il tabarro, Giorgetta
- Suor Angelica, Angelica
- Gianni Schicchi, Lauretta
- Turandot, Turandot / Liù

Vincenzo Bellini

- Norma, Norma

Gaetano Donizetti

- Maria Stuarda, Maria
- Lucrezia Borgia, Lucrezia
- Alina, regina di Golconda, Alina
- Don Pasquale, Norina
- L'elisir d'amore, Adina
- Le convenienze ed inconvenienze teatrali, Corilla
- Poliuto, Paolina

Gioachino Rossini

- Ciro in Babilonia, Amira
- Il signor Bruschino, Sofia
- La pietra del paragone, Fulvia
- Elisabetta, regina d'Inghilterra, Matilde
- Mosè in Egitto, Amaltea
- Guglielmo Tell, Matilde
- Il Barbiere di Siviglia, Berta

Wolfgang Amadeus Mozart

- Le nozze di Figaro, Contessa
- Così fan tutte, Fiordiligi
- Don Giovanni, Donna Elvira
- La Clemenza di Tito, Vitellia

Pietro Mascagni

- Cavalleria rusticana, Santuzza
- Iris, Iris

Umberto Giordano

- Andrea Chénier, Maddalena
- Fedora, Fedora
- La cena delle beffe, Ginevra

Francesco Cilea

- Adriana Lecouvreur, Adriana

Ruggero Leoncavallo

- Pagliacci, Nedda
- I Medici, Simonetta

Christoph Willibald Gluck

- Iphigénie en Tauride, Iphigénie
- Orfeo ed Euridice, Euridice

Claudio Monteverdi

- L'incoronazione di Poppea, Poppea

Georg Friedrich Händel

- Giulio Cesare, Sesto Pompeo

Arrigo Boito

- Mefistofele, Margherita

Georges Bizet

- Carmen, Micaela

Giovanni Battista Pergolesi

- La serva padrona, Serpina
- Adriano in Siria, Sabina
- Il Flaminio, Flaminio

Domenico Cimarosa

- Gli Orazi e i Curiazi, Curiazio
- Le astuzie femminili, Bellina
- Il convito, Lisetta

Jacques Offenbach

- Les Contes d'Hoffmann, Antonia

Amilcare Ponchielli

- La Gioconda, Gioconda

Sergei Prokofiev

- Igrok, Polina

Nino Rota

- Il cappello di paglia di Firenze, Elena

Antonio Salieri

- Les Danaïdes, Ipermestra

Tommaso Traetta

- Le serve rivali, Carlina

Antonio Vivaldi

- Farnace, Selinda

Ermanno Wolf-Ferrari

- Sly, Dolly

Riccardo Zandonai

- Francesca da Rimini, Francesca

== Discography ==
- Giuseppe Verdi: I Vespri Siciliani, recorded 2010 for the Verdi Bicentenary, with Fabio Armiliato and Leo Nucci, Orchestra of Teatro Regio Di Parma, Massimo Zanetti (conductor).
- Giuseppe Verdi: La Traviata. Orchestra del Teatro Regio di Parma, John Neschling, conductor. SoloVoce
- Giuseppe Verdi: Aida. Armiliato, Fiorillo. Opus Arte (BBC)
- Daniela Dessì sings Verdi. Orchestra della Fondazione Toscanini, Steven Mercurio, conductor. Decca
- Giacomo Puccini: Madama Butterfly. Armiliato, Pons, Plácido Domingo, conductor. Dynamic
- Giacomo Puccini: Tosca. Armiliato, Raimondi. Opus Arte (BBC)
- Giacomo Puccini: Manon Lescaut. Armiliato, Vanaud, Mercurio. Real Sound
- Puccini Arias. Orchestra dell'Arena di Verona, Marco Boemi, conductor. Decca
- Francesco Cilea: Adriana Lecouvreur. Borodina, Larin, Guelfi; Rizzi-Brignoli. TDK
- Domenico Cimarosa: Gli Orazii e i Curiazii. Angeloni, Bolognesi, Alaimo; De Bernart, conductor. Bongiovanni
- Umberto Giordano: Andrea Chénier. Armiliato, Guelfi, Rinaldi; Orchestra Sinfonica Verdi Milano, Vjekoslav Šutej, conductor. Universal
- Gioachino Rossini: Il barbiere di Siviglia. Raffanti, Depuy, Portella; Zedda, conductor. Frequenz
- Gioachino Rossini: Ciro in Babilonia. Palacio, Calvi, Antonucci; Rizzi, conductor. Bongiovanni
- Enrico Toselli: Le Romanze Ritrovate. Armiliato, Leonardo Previero, piano. Real Sound
- Antonio Vivaldi: Il Farnace. Dupuy, Angeloni, Malakova, Gamberucci; De Bernart, conductor. Arkadia Fonit Cetra/Agora Musica
- Love Duets. conductor: Marco Boemi. Philips
- Various authors, Ave Maria. Decca, 2012. Roberto Scarpa Meylougan, organ.

== Awards ==
- Premio Flaviano Labó (2010)
- Premio Operaclick (2009)
- Premio Città di Varese (2009)
- Premio Myrta Gabardi (2009)
- Pentagramma d'Oro Comune di Marnate (2009)
- Premio Abbiati (2008)
- Regina della Lirica dalla Associazione Tiberini a San Lorenzo in Campo (2007)
- Premio Le Muse (2007)
- Premio Zenatello Arena di Verona
- Premio Giordano Comune di Baveno
- Premio Giacomo Puccini Torre del Lago
- Premio Cilea di Reggio Calabria
- Gigli d’Oro Comune di Recanati
- Premio Liguria Comune di Genova
- Premio E. Mazzoleni Palermo
- Mascagni d’Oro Bagnara di Romagna
- Premio Giuditta Pasta Saronno
