= Sem Benelli =

Italian writer

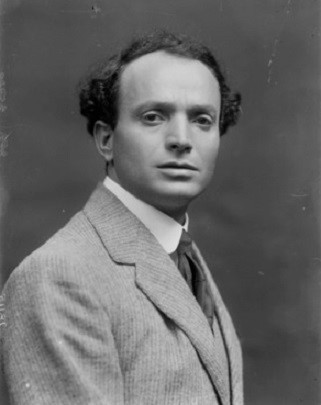
- Sem Benelli
- Born: 10 August 1877; Prato, Kingdom of Italy
- Died: 18 December 1949 (aged 72); Zoagli, Italy
- Resting place: San Domenico, Prato
- Occupations: Dramatist; Poet
- Writing career
- Language: Italian
- Period: 20th century
- Genres: Drama; libretto
- Movement: Decadent movement

Signature
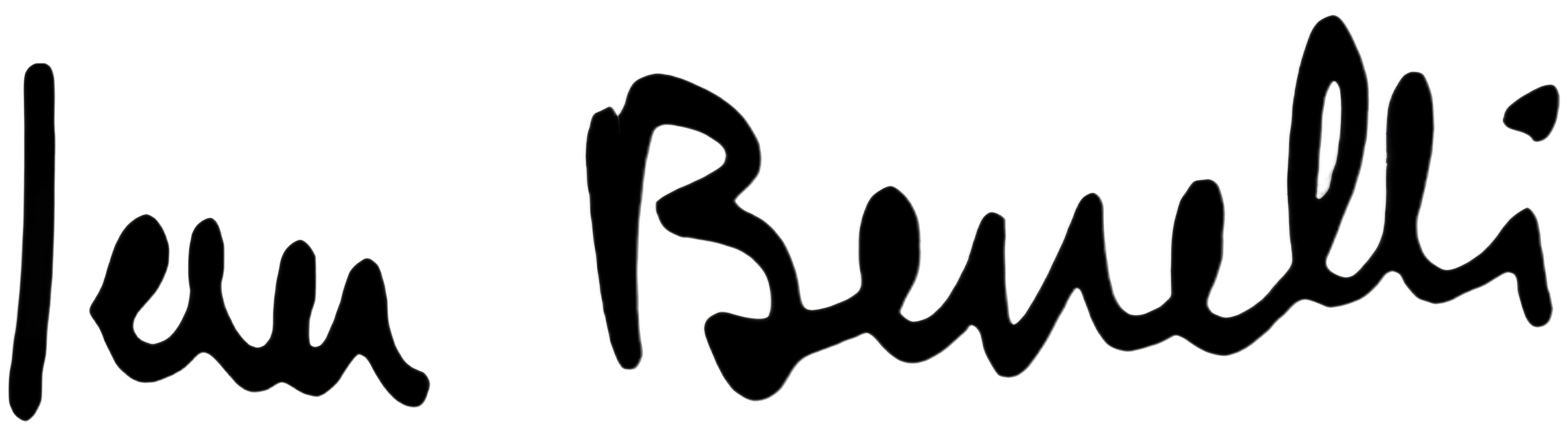

Sem Benelli (August 10, 1877 – December 18, 1949) was an Italian playwright, essayist and librettist. He provided the texts for several noted Italian operas, including Italo Montemezzi's L'amore dei tre re and L'incantesimo, and Umberto Giordano's La cena delle beffe, based on Benelli's own play of the same title.

== Biography ==
Sem Benelli was born in Prato on August 10, 1877. He studied at the Piarist school in Florence, where his chief teacher was the scholar Ermenegildo Pistelli. He achieved widespread recognition for his historical dramas in verse. The first of these was La maschera di Bruto (1908), in which Lorenzaccio, the murderer of Duke Alessandro de' Medici, is likened to the Roman politician Brutus.

The second and better known, The Jester's Supper (1909), is a theatrical adaptation of a story by Antonio Francesco Grazzini set in Renaissance Florence. A revenge drama, it caught the popular taste of the period and its leading role, Giannetto, attracted great actors such as John Barrymore and Sarah Bernhardt. The play was a great New York theatre success in 1919 under the title The Jest, starring Lionel and John Barrymore. In Italy Paola Pezzaglia was considered the best male protagonist of La cena delle beffe, after an incident in 1913 when the leading man collapsed before playing the character of Giannetto; she took his place achieving resounding success. Ever since Pezzaglia carried on doing the same role again and again. Benelli wrote the screenplay for the 1942 film The Jester's Supper based on his own famous play.

Benelli's tragedies can be compared to D'Annunzio's for their use of verse, elaborate sets, and costume, but they had a stronger appeal to middle-class audiences and might usefully be regarded as caricatures of D'Annunzio's more lofty attempts at tragic revival. Benelli also wrote several prose plays; his bourgeois comedy, Tignola (1908), treated the same themes as Luigi Chiarelli's La maschera e il volto (1916) some eight years earlier.

After serving in World War I, Benelli joined the Fascist movement, but left the party after the Matteotti affair (1924). The book Io in Africa (1936) gives his impressions of the war of Ethiopia, in which he served as a volunteer. At the outbreak of World War II, however, he rejected Fascism again and emigrated to Switzerland, returning to Italy only after fall of the Fascist regime.

in 1914, Benelli commissioned the Sem Benelli Castle in Zoagli where he would die.

== Sources ==
- Marotti, Ferruccio (1966). "BENELLI, Sem". Dizionario Biografico degli Italiani (in Italian). Vol. 8: Bellucci–Beregan. Rome: Istituto dell'Enciclopedia Italiana. ISBN 978-88-12-00032-6.
