= La nave =

Opera by Italo Montemezzi

- Opera by Italo Montemezzi
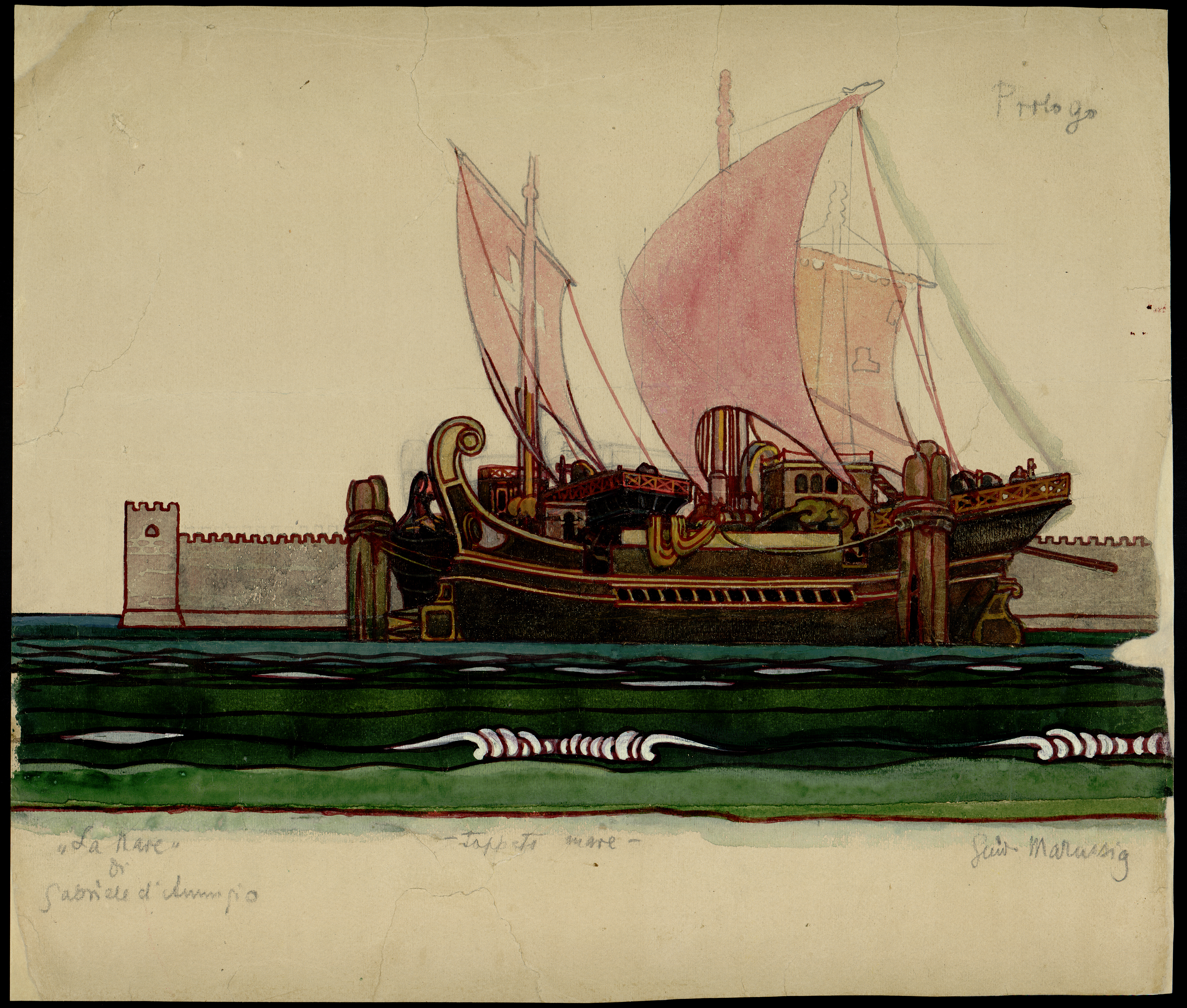
- Set design by Guido Marussig for the 1918 premiere
- Translation: The Ship
- Librettist: Tito Ricordi
- Language: Italian
- Based on: Gabriele D'Annunzio's play
- Premiere: 4 November 1918; La Scala, Milan

La nave (The Ship) is an opera in a prologue and three "episodes" by Italian composer Italo Montemezzi. Its Italian-language libretto was adapted by Tito Ricordi from Gabriele D'Annunzio's 1908 play of the same name. (Note: D'Annunzio's play was also the basis of two silent films, the first in 1912 and the second in 1921 which was directed by his son and starred Ida Rubinstein.) It premiered at La Scala in Milan on 3 November 1918.

== First performance ==
The opera premiered at La Scala in Milan on 3 November 1918, conducted by Tullio Serafin. La nave is a work which contains strongly patriotic and imperialistic themes, and fortune seemed to smile on its first performance when, after the conclusions of the first and second episodes, the performance was interrupted by announcements that Italian troops had entered Trento and Trieste respectively, thus signaling a successful end to Italy's involvement in World War I. A myth later developed that La nave had been a great popular and critical success in 1918. The source of this error appears to be a statement Serafin made in Opera News in 1953: "La nave was received as well as – perhaps better than – [Montemezzi's great hit] L'Amore [dei tre re]. ... it was received with warm enthusiasm by the critics of all the Milan papers" In fact, Serafin was misremembering, and none of the reviews was particularly enthusiastic. The critics praised Montemezzi's orchestral and choral writing, but criticised the opera for being insufficiently tuneful, too Germanic in style, and based on an unsuitable source. The most positive review, which appeared in the Corriere della Sera (attributed to Renato Simoni by David Chandler), described the opera as a "sincere success" with the public, but also noted that the audience response had been "only occasionally truly enthusiastic."

== Later performances ==
Productions followed in Chicago in 1919 and Verona in 1923. It was also revived in Rome in 1938. But many factors militated against the opera's long-term success. It was extremely expensive to stage, due to its large choruses, extravagant scenery, and, especially, the requirement of having a full-sized ship heading out to sea, on stage, in the final act. The lead roles are also very difficult. In addition, La nave's extremely violent and aggressively imperialistic rhetoric seemed out of place after the fall of Mussolini at the end of the Second World War.

La nave was performed in New York City by Teatro Grattacielo in concert on October 31, 2012, the first time the opera had been heard in the United States since Montemezzi conducted it in Chicago in 1919. The performance was conducted by Israel Gursky, and featured the Dessoff Symphonic Choir with a cast led by Tiffany Abban as Basiliola, Robert Brubaker as Marco, and Daniel Ihn-Kyu Lee as Sergio Gràtico.

== Roles ==
Roles, voice types, premiere cast
Role	Voice type	Première cast: 3 November 1918 Conductor: Tullio Serafin
Basiliola	soprano	Elena Rakowska
Orso Faledro	bass	Giulio Cirino
Marco Gràtico	tenor	Edoardo Di Giovanni (Edward Johnson)
Sergio Gràtico	baritone	Francesco Cigada
Gauro Pietro Orseolo	tenor	'Unknown'
Zosimo	bass	Oreste Carozzi

== See also ==
- L'amore dei tre re, 1913 opera by Montemezzi
- L'incantesimo, 1943 opera by Montemezzi
