= Sant'Omero =

- Comune
- Comune di Sant'Omero
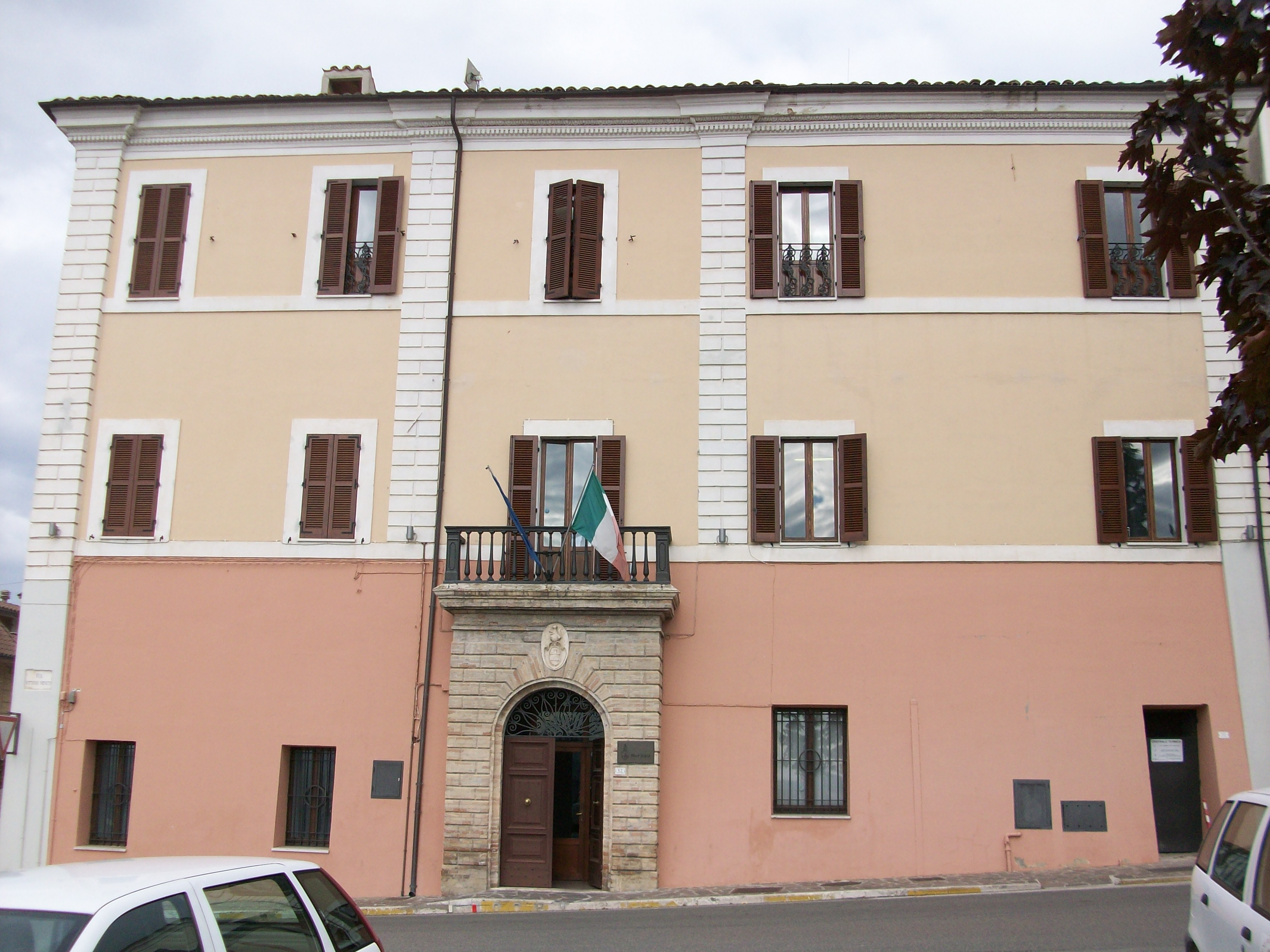
- Town hall.

- Location within Italy Location within Abruzzo
- Coordinates: 42°46′N 13°48′E
- Country: Italy
- Region: Abruzzo
- Province: Teramo (TE)
- Frazioni: Barracche, Case Alte, Casette, Fontana Vecchia, Garrufo, Mediana, Pignotto, Poggio Morello, Santa Maria a Vico, Villa Gatti, Villa Ricci

Government
  - Mayor: Andrea Luzii

Area
  - Total: 34.2 km^{2} (13.2 sq mi)
- Elevation: 209 m (686 ft)

Population (1 January 2016)
  - Total: 5,243
  - Density: 153/km^{2} (397/sq mi)
- Demonym: Santomeresi
- Time zone: UTC+1 (CET)
  - Summer (DST): UTC+2 (CEST)
- Postal code: 64027
- Dialing code: 0861
- ISTAT code: 067039
- Patron saint: Sant'Omero
- Saint day: 3 June
- Website: Official website

Sant'Omero (Abruzzese: Sand'Mirë) is a town and comune in the province of Teramo in the Abruzzo region of eastern Italy.

Near the town is the 10th-century church of Santa Maria a Vico.

The Town Is twinned with the polish town of Szamocin
