= Il grillo del focolare =

- Opera by Riccardo Zandonai
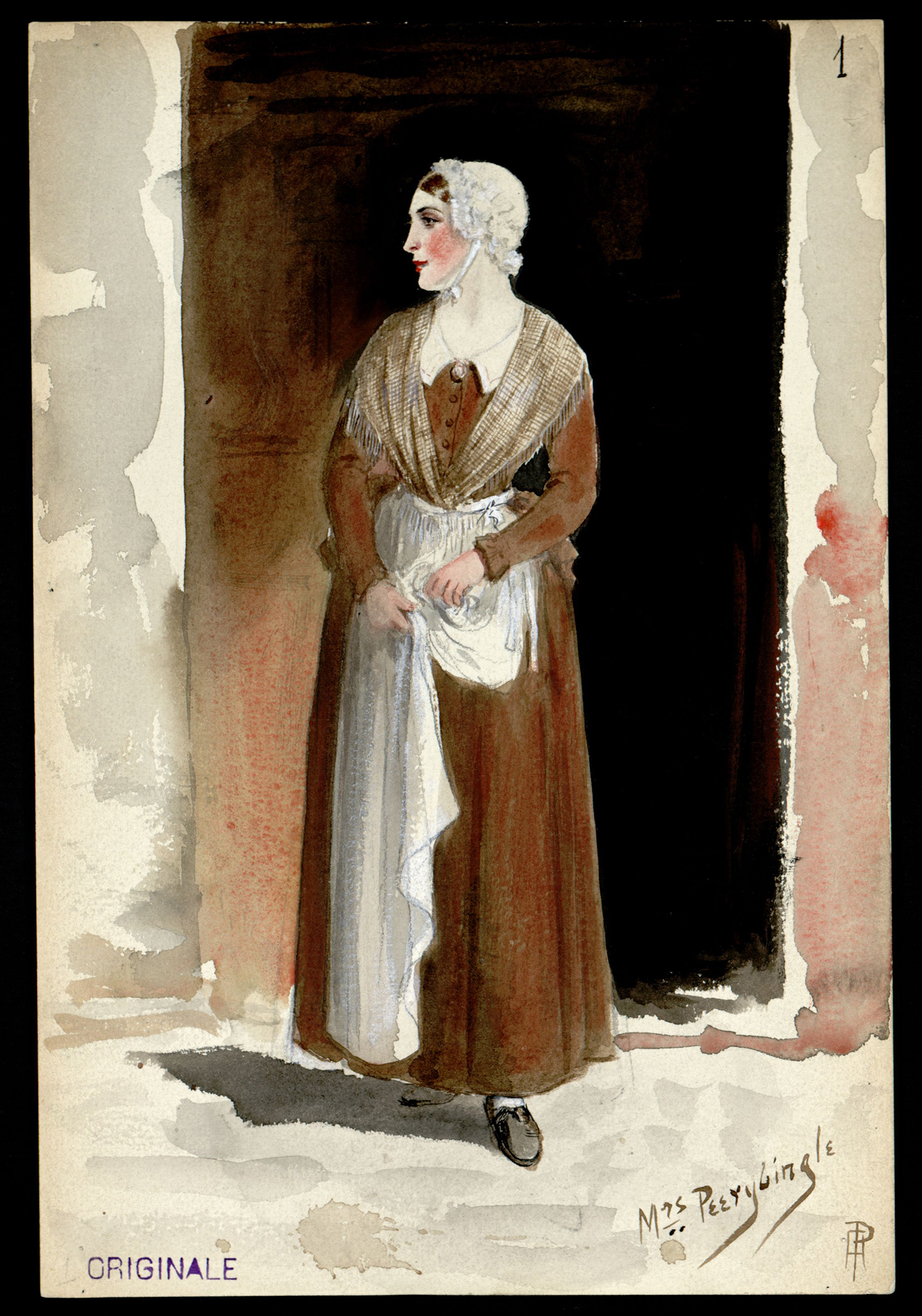
- 1.2
- Librettist: Cesare Hanau
- Language: Italian
- Based on: The Cricket on the Hearth by Charles Dickens
- Premiere: 28 November 1908; Teatro Politeama Chiarella, Turin

Il grillo del focolare is an opera in three acts by Riccardo Zandonai to an Italian libretto by Cesare Hanau based on The Cricket on the Hearth by Charles Dickens. It premiered on 28 November 1908 at the Teatro Politeama Chiarella in Turin (Politeama Chiarella di Torino).

== History ==
Dickens' popular novella was the basis for several operas, including Giuseppe Gallignani's Il grillo del focolare which premiered in Genoa in 1873, Karl Goldmark's Das Heimchen am Herd (libretto by A. M. Willner) which premiered in Berlin (1896) and New York (1910), and a setting by English composer Alexander Mackenzie (president of the Royal Academy of Music) which was composed to a libretto by Julian Sturgis in 1900. All of these predated Zandonai's setting, which helped bring him to the attention of publisher Giulio Ricordi. Following success in Torino, Zandonai's opera had successful performances in Nice and Genoa. It has received occasional performances in Europe throughout the century and a live performance with the Orchestra filarmonica "G. Rossini" di Pesaro conducted by Ottavio Ziino (presented by Città di Osimo, Festival Opera lirica) was broadcast by RAI in 1986 and was made available on DVD by House of Opera. The North American premiere was given in a concert version by Teatro Grattacielo in October 2017, conducted by Israel Gursky.

== Roles ==
Role	Voice type	Premiere cast, 28 November 1908 (Conductor: Pietro Cimini)
John Peerybingle, a carrier	baritone	Edmondo Grandini
Dot, his wife	soprano	Albertina Baldi
Caleb Plummer, a poor toymaker working for Tackleton	baritone	Francesco Federici
Bertha Plummer, his blind daughter	mezzo-soprano	Bice Lucchini
Edward Plummer, her brother (son of Caleb)	tenor	Angelo Pintucci
May Fielding, the fiancée of Edward	soprano	Ernestina Bertinetti
Tackleton, a toy-maker	bass	Ugo Cannetti
Chorus
