= Beniamino Gigli Prize =

Award organization

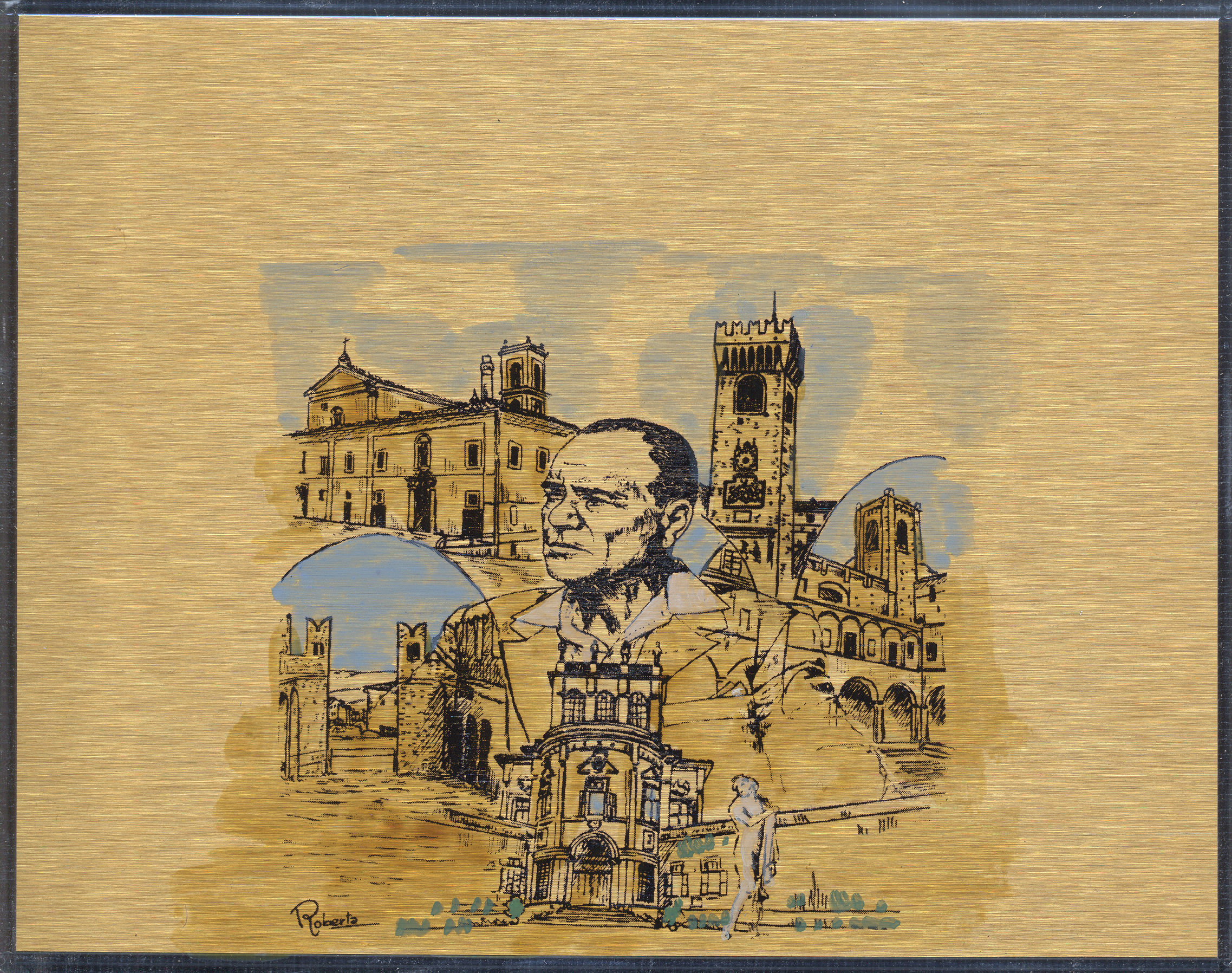
- Awarded for: Honour who know and study Beniamino Gigli
- Country: Finland
- First award: 1993

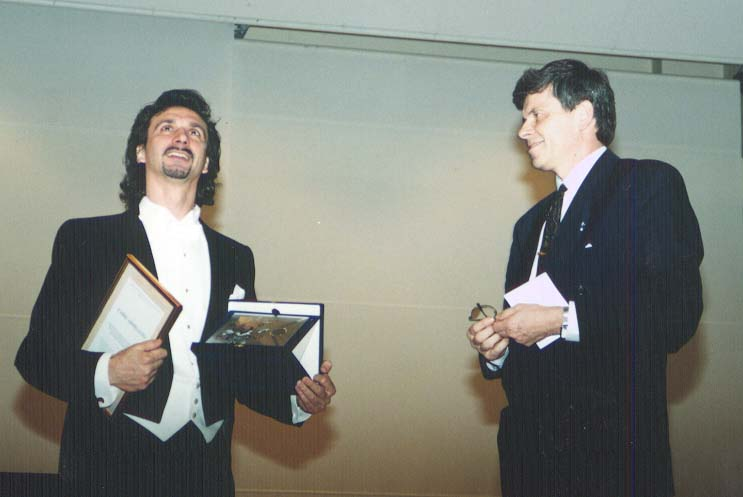
Italian tenor Fabio Armiliato receiving the Beniamino Gigli Prize of 2000

The Beniamino Gigli Prize is a Finnish music award, given to artists who carry out research and musical studies about Beniamino Gigli. The Finnish Beniamino Gigli Club, affiliated with the Finnish National Opera and Ballet, established the award in 1993 and the winner is chosen by the company's board of directors.

The award was designed by the Marche company Roberta Arti Grafiche and depicts Beniamino Gigli and some glimpses of Recanati.

== Awarded ==
Year	Winner	Category
1993	Raimo Sirkiä	Tenore
1994	Peter Lindroos	Tenore
1995	Raili Viljakainen	Soprano
1996	Pietro Ballo	Tenore
1997	Riitta-Liisa Kyykkä	Pianista
1998	Roberto Bencivenga	Tenore
1999	Rossella Redoglia	Soprano
2000	Fabio Armiliato	Tenore
2001	Stefano Secco	Tenore
2002	Hannu Jurmu	Tenore
2003	Salvatore Fisichella	Tenore
2004	Gabriella Colecchia	Mezzosoprano
2005	Giorgio Casciarri	Tenore
2006	Simona Baldolini	Soprano
2007	Francisco Casanova	Tenore
2008	Andrea Cesare Coronella (also as Cesare Dina)	Tenore
2010	Maurizio Graziani	Tenore
2011	Roberto De Biasio	Tenore
2012	Domenico Menini	Tenore
2013	Ivanna Speranza	Soprano
2014	Andrea Carè	Tenore
2015	Mika Kares	Basso
2015	Liisa Pimiä	Pianista
2016	Mario Leonardi	Tenore
2016	Torsten Brander	Musical influencer
2017	Camilla Nylund	Soprano
2018	Gilda Fiume	Soprano
