= Nicolaus Ricci de Nucella Campli =

Italian composer

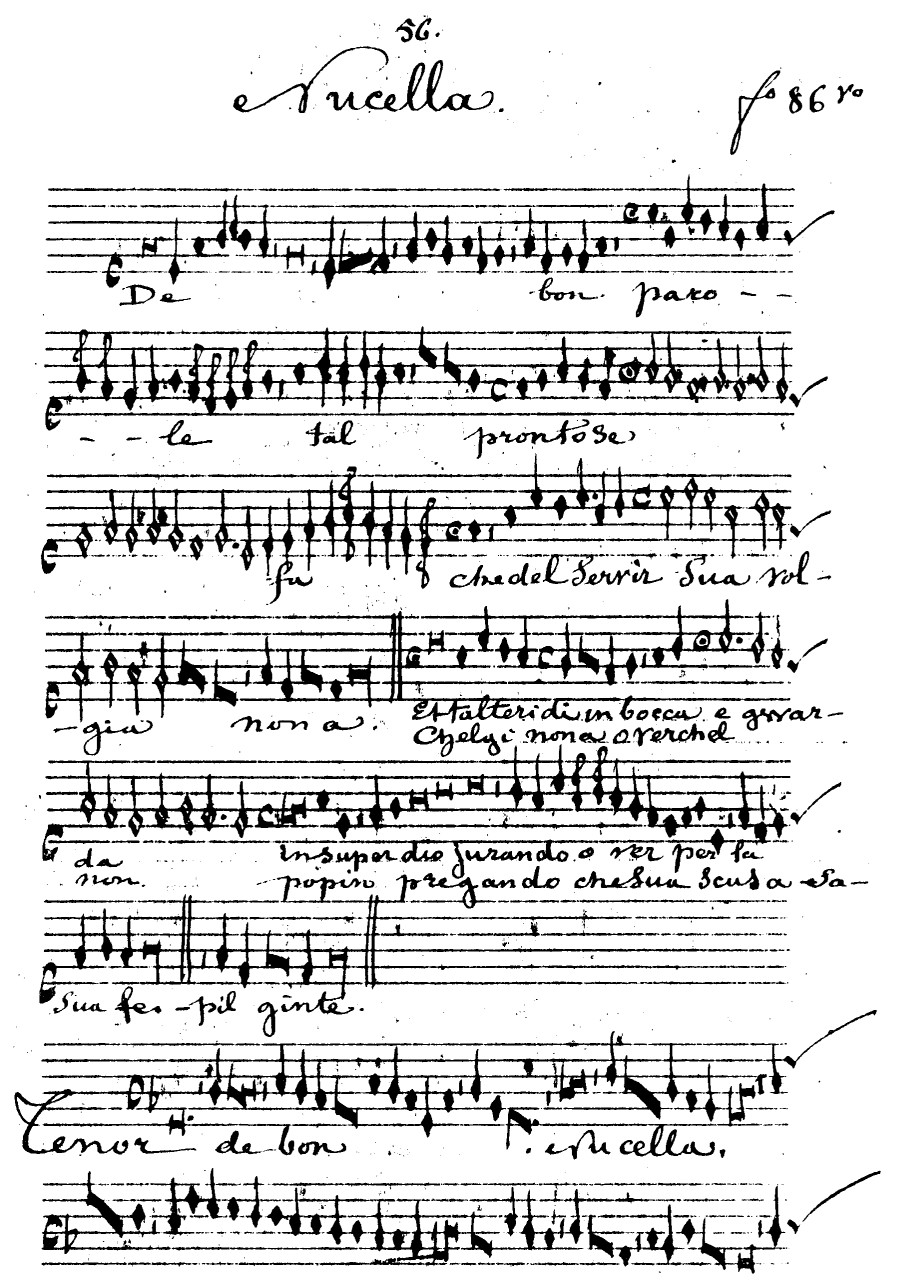
Ballata "De bon parole" by Niccolò Ricci, in its only surviving source, a 19th-century copy of a burned 15th-century manuscript.

Nicolaus Savini Mathei alias Ricci de Nucella Campli, (fl. 1401–1425; d. 1438 or after), also Niccolò Ricci and Nucella, was an Italian composer, singer, and scribe of the late fourteenth and early fifteenth centuries. Only a single work by Nicolaus is known, the ballata De bon parole.

== Life ==
Nothing was known of this composer until the discoveries of Giuliano Di Bacco and John Nádas, published in summary form in 1998 and more completely in 2004. From his name it seems he was born or active in Abruzzo, since "Nucella" or "Nocella" is a small località less than 2 km south-east of Campli.

He is documented as a member of the papal chapels of Popes Boniface IX, Innocent VII, and Gregory XII of the Roman obedience from 1401–1410. He was listed as "cantor dnp" (singer for the lord, the pope) and "prepositus ecclesie S. Victorie de Nucella Campli Aprutin. dioc." ("Provost of the church of Saint Victoria of Nocella, Campli in the diocese of Teramo") in a document from November 10, 1401. He is later listed as also being a familiar of the pope (March 27, 1405), then a priest (July 15, 1407), then a scribe for the pope (May 5, 1410), while gaining affiliations with several other churches. On October 17, 1435 Nicolaus Ricci was given a six-month release from his duties to visit his father who was about to celebrate his hundredth birthday. On February 13, 1436 he is noted as released from obligations ("absolutio"). On the recommendation from the Cardinal of S. Clemente, Pope Eugenius IV appointed Baptista Maco Palazzo as Niccolò's successor on July 6, 1438.

== Music ==
Nicolaus Ricci is known as the composer of a single, extant piece, De bon parole. It is attributed to "Nucella" on folio 86r in its single source, the manuscript Strasbourg M222 C22 (destroyed in 1870 by a fire started by a bombardment in the Franco-Prussian War but surviving in a copy by Edmond de Coussemaker now in Brussels). The attribution to "Nucella" was thought to be a corruption of the word "Micinella", the title of a Gloria by Antonio "Zachara" da Teramo and thus a possible work of Zachara's. The new biographical evidence invalidates this theory, and some stylistic similarities can be explained by both composers being active in Rome in the Papal Chapel at the same time. This three-voice piece is in tempus imperfectum cum prolatione minori (2/4) in the lower voices while coloration and ars subtilior note shapes in the cantus let that voice move through the two major prolations (6/8 and 9/8).

== Edition and recording ==
Nicolaus Ricci's ballata "De bon parole" was edited in Polyphonic Music of the Fourteenth Century vol. 10, W. Thomas Marrocco, ed. (Monaco: Éditions de L'oiseau-lyre, 1977), pp. 101–2, 152, and has been recorded on Menando gli anni. La Musica in Abruzzo tra Medioevo e Rinascimento, Le Cantrici di Euterpe CD02, by the Italian group Aquila Altera ensemble (2002) and Un Fior Gentile. L'Ars Nova di Zacara da Teramo, Micrologus CDM 0012.00, by the Italian group "Ensemble Micrologus" (2004).
