= San Pietro, Campli =

Church building in Campovalano, Campli, Italy

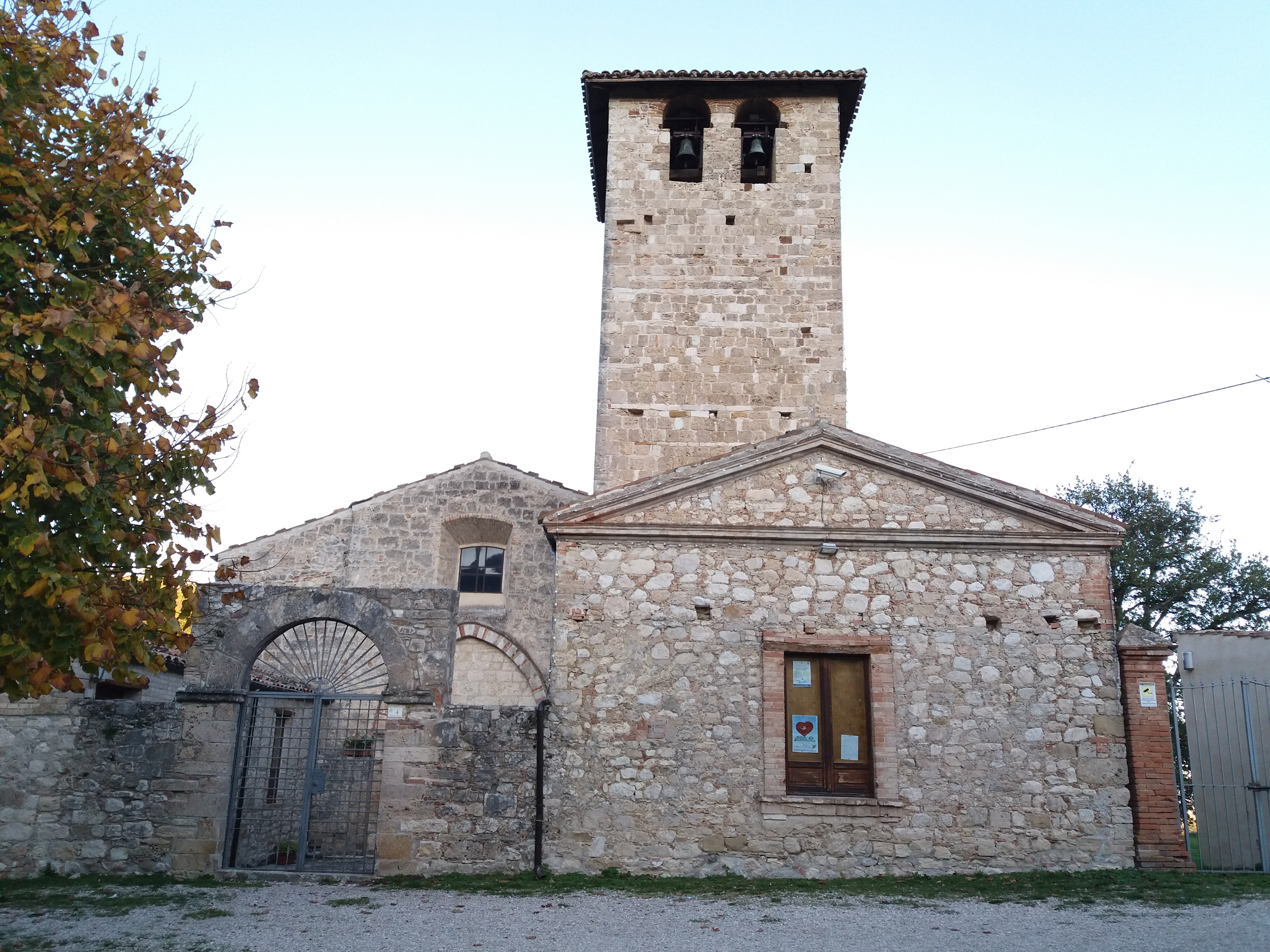
Campovalano - Chiesa di San Pietro 04.jpg

San Pietro is a Romanesque, Roman Catholic church in the frazione of Campovalano of the town of Campli, Province of Teramo, Region of Abruzzo, Italy.

== History ==
The stone church is adjacent to ruins of a former Benedictine order. The convent was founded in the 8th century, and rebuilt in the 12th-13th century by the Premonstratensians or Norbertines, that is, monks of St Norbert.

The church presents a ground plan with three naves divided by four broad rectangular pillars; it ends with three Romanesque-style apses. The church has walls made of both ashlar stone, interspersed with brick. Some of the arches are pointed, showing the influence of Gothic architecture.

The first pillar on the right has a 13th-century fresco of the Madonna with Child attributed to an unknown local master. The third pillar on the left has a 15th-century fresco depicting St Onophrius attributed to Aurelio Andronico of Nicomedia. The church also has a paleo-Christian bas-relief depicting Biblical scenes.
