= Santa Maria a Vico, Sant'Omero =

Roman Catholic Church in Sant'Omero, Abruzzo, Italy

Santa Maria a Vico is a Romanesque-style, Roman Catholic church located near the town of Sant’Omero, province of Teramo, region of Abruzzo, Italy.

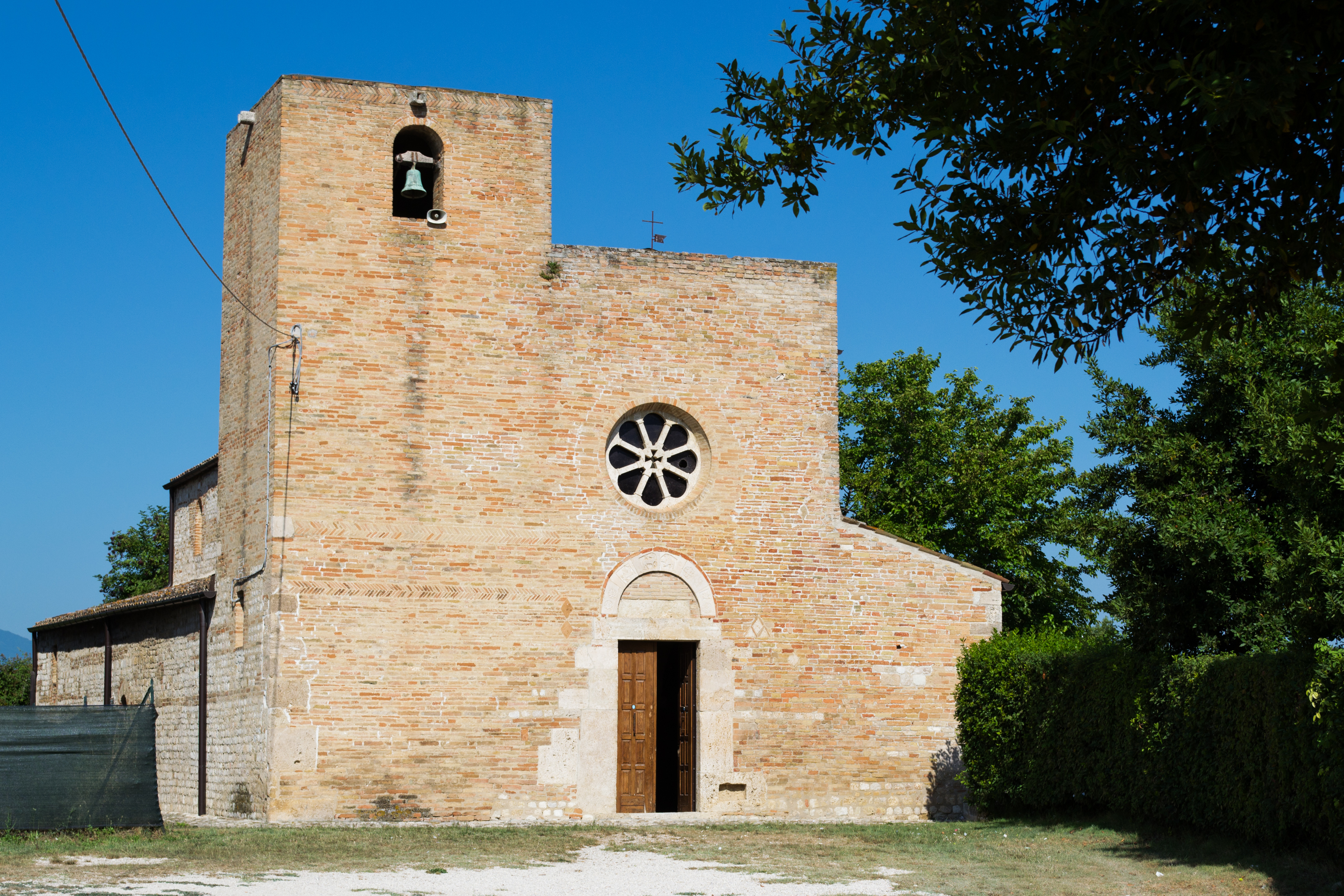
Church facade

== History ==
Tradition holds the church was built before the year 1000, atop the remains of a pagan temple dedicated to Hercules. It was rebuilt in Romanesque style.

The rectangular layout is divided into three naves; the central one ends in a rounded apse. Arches with pillars with square capitals separate the naves. The windows are small except for the round window in the main façade. In 1300, the bell tower was built.

The interior houses 14th-century frescoes, in poor state of conservation, depicting an Enthroned Madonna and Child, an Annunciation, another Madonna with Child, a half-length Blessing Christ inside a clypeus (shield), and a Saint John the Evangelist.

The portal is carved with the Agnus Dei surrounded by the symbols of the Evangelists: as well as floral and geometric motives.
