= Andrea Carè =

Italian opera tenor (born 1981)

Andrea Carè (born 12 August 1981) is an Italian tenor. Born in Turin, he studied at the Giuseppe Verdi Conservatory in Turin.

== Career ==
Carè is a representative of the School of Raina Kabaivanska and he was also among the last students who had the privilege to study with Luciano Pavarotti. He was also the winner of the Spoleto International Opera Competition in 2005.

Since his debut, he has appeared with the Royal Opera House Covent Garden, Grand Théâtre de Genève, Royal Swedish Opera, Bolshoi Theater, Gran Teatre del Liceu, Teatro Regio in Turin, Opéra national du Rhin, Opera di Roma, Deutsche Oper Berlin, Hamburg State Opera, Teatro alla Scala, La Fenice in Venice, Teatro Comunale in Bologna, Teatro Massimo in Palermo, Beijing's National Centre for the Performing Arts, Canadian Opera Company, Vancouver Opera, Palau de Les Arts in Valencia and Savonlinna Opera Festival.

Conductors he has worked with include Daniele Callegari, Paolo Arrivabeni, Bruno Bartoletti, Riccardo Chailly, Gianandrea Noseda, Evelino Pidò, Domingo Hindoyan, Nayden Todorov, Pier Giorgio Morandi, Daniel Oren and Pinchas Steinberg, among others. His operatic roles engagements include the title roles of Don Carlo, Stiffelio, Samson and Sigurd and other prominent roles including Gustavo (Un ballo in maschera), Cavaradossi (Tosca), Enzo Grimaldo (La Gioconda), Pollione (Norma), Giasone (Medea), Pinkerton (Madama Butterfly), and Ctirad (Šárka). His signature roles include Don José (Carmen), which he performed with the Singapore Symphony Orchestra, Bolshoi Theatre in Moscow and most notably at the Royal Opera House Covent Garden.

In 2014 he was awarded with Beniamino Gigli Prize.

He features on the Royal Opera House DVD release of Nabucco also featuring Plácido Domingo, released on Sony Classical (2015).
