= L'incantesimo =

- Opera by Italo Montemezzi
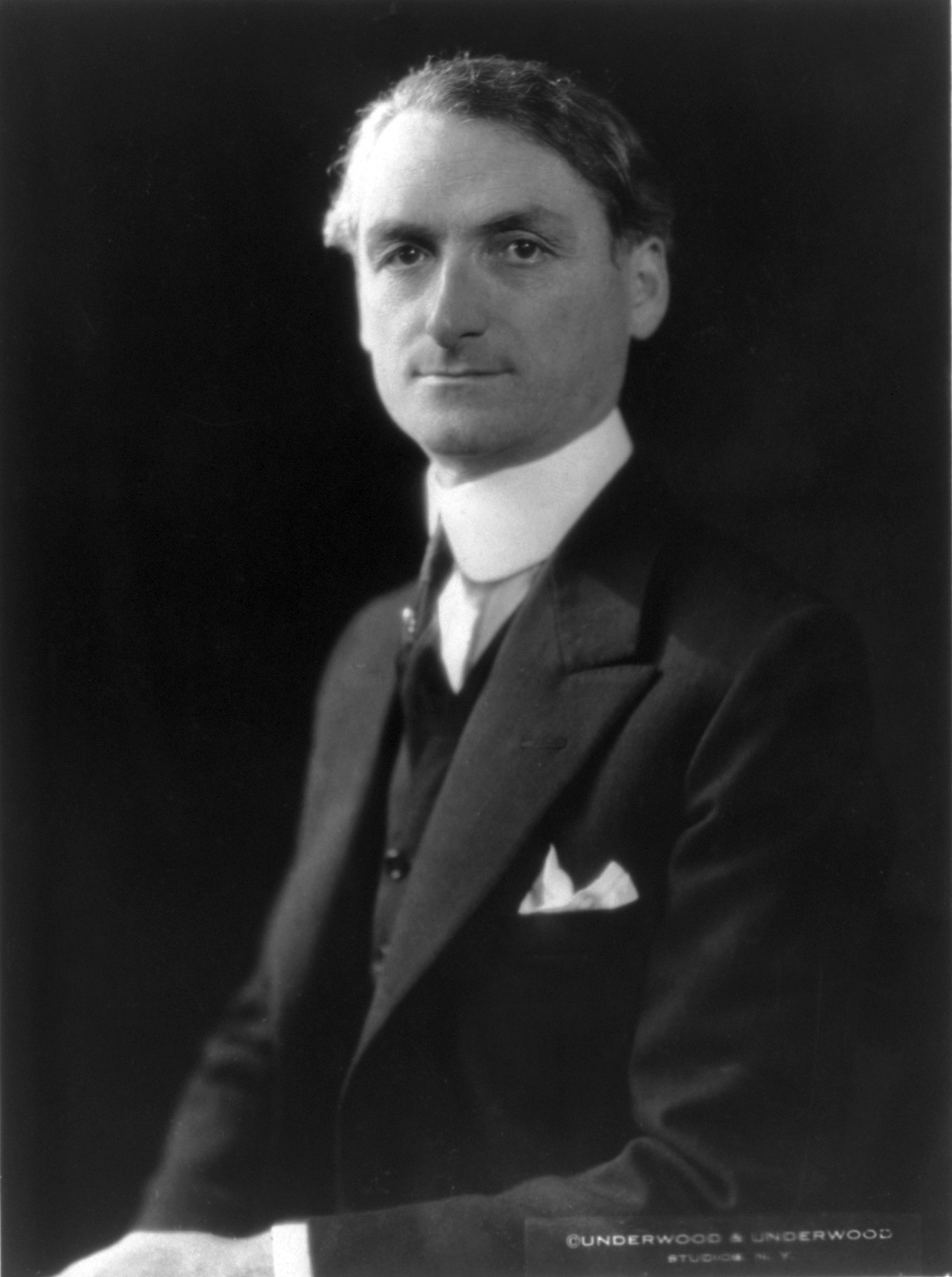
- The composer in 1925
- Librettist: Sem Benelli
- Language: Italian
- Premiere: 9 August 1952; Verona

L'incantesimo (“The Spell”) is a short opera in one act by Italian composer Italo Montemezzi. Its libretto was written by playwright Sem Benelli who had previously collaborated with the composer on his most famous opera, L'amore dei tre re. Benelli finished the text in 1933, and Montemezzi started work on the score, but the composer's unpleasant relationship with Mussolini's government made Italy inconducive to creative work. Montemezzi resumed work on L'incantesimo during the summer of 1943 in Beverly Hills, his home during a 10-year sojourn in the United States. Upon completion of the score, he offered it to the NBC Symphony, professing admiration for their orchestra.

== Performance history ==
L'incantesimo received its broadcast premiere on October 9, 1943, in New York City. The composer conducted the NBC Symphony Orchestra. The opera's stage premiere took place on 9 August 1952, in Verona, Italy, only a few months after Montemezzi's death. The following year, L'incantesimo was performed for Italian radio, and broadcast in 1954. On November 13, 2007 Teatro Grattacielo, a New York group dedicated to reviving neglected verismo scores, performed L'incantesimo in a concert performance at Avery Fisher Hall in Manhattan.

A production (believed to be the first fully staged production of the work in America) was mounted in Pittsburgh, Pennsylvania, in the Hall of Sculpture at the Carnegie Museum of Art by the Opera Theater of Pittsburgh February 12, 13, and 14 of 2010, conducted by Bernard McDonald and directed by Jonathan Eaton. The cast included Daniel Teadt as Folco, Anna Singer as Giselda, Ric Furman as Rinaldo and Craig Priebe as Salomone.

Despite the opera's late date of composition, its musical style is firmly rooted in the late-romantic tradition, combining Italian lyricism with the orchestral techniques of Wagner and Richard Strauss.

== Roles ==
Role	Voice type	Premiere cast 9 October 1943 (Conductor: Italo Montemezzi)
Folco, a nobleman	baritone	Alexander Sved
Giselda, his wife	soprano	Vivian Della Chiesa
Rinaldo, her former suitor	tenor	Mario Berini
Salomone, a necromancer	bass	Virgilio Lazzari
A servant	baritone	

== Synopsis ==
The action takes place in Folco's wintry castle during the Middle Ages. Folco, a boastful and possessive man, has sent for Rinaldo, but, noting the falling snow, worries that his old friend will not come. Rinaldo had loved Folco's wife Giselda, and had longed to marry her. Giselda questions Folco as to why he has summoned her old love, whom she has not seen since their wedding. Folco tells her that Rinaldo is bringing with him a magician, whom Folco hopes will be able to tell him the meaning of a disturbing encounter he'd experienced while hunting earlier that day.

Rinaldo finally appears, accompanied by the mysterious necromancer Salomone. Folco welcomes them warmly, and in his aria "Allora ascolta!", explains how, while pursuing a wolf in the snowy forest, he'd raised his eyes to behold a white hind whose face was that of Giselda. Bewildered, he had stabbed the creature, whose sad eyes seemed to beg for mercy, and then had fled, horrified, into the forest. Salomone explains that if Folco's love for Giselda can survive, he must return to the forest, find the wounded hind, and carry it lovingly back to the castle, as if it were Giselda herself. Folco assures the magician that he can certainly accomplish this.

As soon as Folco leaves, Rinaldo passionately informs Giselda that he has never forgotten his love for her, but rather has, in the loneliness of his dwelling gazed upon her, and held her as if she were all his. Giselda scolds Rinaldo, but he assures her that love can accomplish anything, and that he thus has no doubt that she will be his. But Giselda scoffs at his ardent assurances. Love can do anything? Can it change the wintry garden that they see through the window to spring? If love can do that, she tells him, then she'll believe him. But Salomone interjects, "If you love, you shall see the spring."

Folco now returns. He has not found the body of the doe in the forest, and mysteriously, cannot seem to see Giselda now either, but rather sees the body of the doe lying where she stands. Suddenly, the garden blossoms, and Giselda sings ecstatically of its ravishing beauty, and yields herself to Rinaldo's love.

== Recording ==
Private recordings of the original 1943 radio broadcast have circulated for years. This performance was released in 1999 as part of the album Souvenirs from Verismo Operas Volume 4 on the International Record Collectors Club label. It features Alexander Sved as Folco, Vivian Della Chiesa as Giselda, Mario Berini as Rinaldo, and Virgilio Lazzari as Salomone.

== See also ==
- L'amore dei tre re, 1913 opera by Montemezzi
- La nave, 1918 opera by Montemezzi
