= Raimo Sirkiä =

Finnish operatic tenor (born 1951)

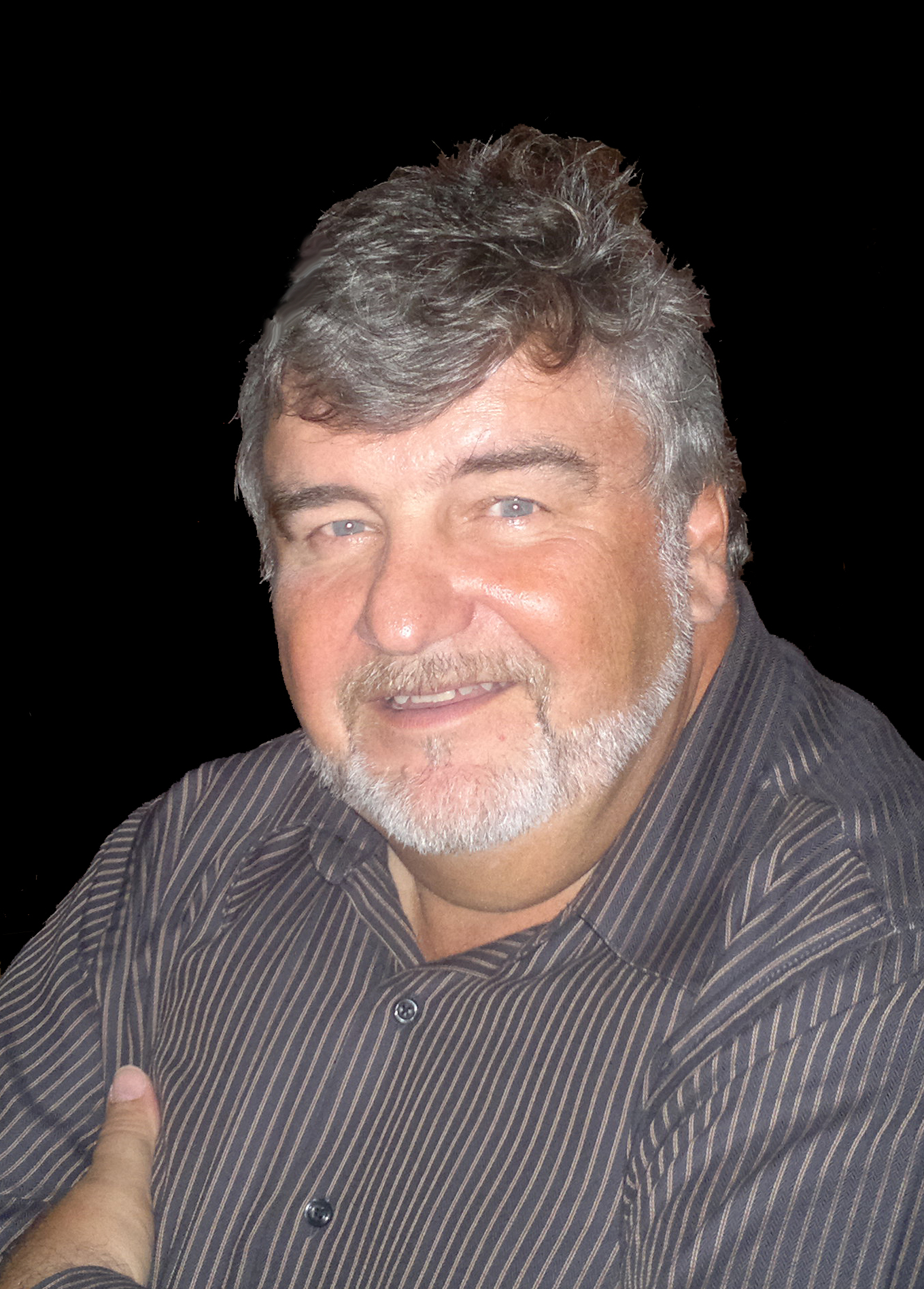
Raimo Sirkiä

Raimo Sirkiä (born 7 February 1951) is a Finnish operatic tenor whose repertoire ranges from spinto to dramatic.

The musical education or Raimo Sirkiä began at the age of four. He was the Finnish Champion in accordion four times, 1960, 1961, 1962 and 1964.

He studied music pedagogics and voice at the Sibelius Academy in Helsinki, and in Rome with Gavarrini and Morelli. He won the prestigious Timo Mustakallio award for young opera singers in 1981.

Raimo Sirkiä performed mainly in Germany from 1983 to 2001. He was the principal tenor at the Finnish National Opera from 1990 to 2006. Sirkiä's most noted roles are in Otello, Calaf, Tannhäuser, Siegmund, and Lohengrin.

Mr. Sirkiä has recorded several complete operas, symphonies, as well as many solo CDs of opera arias, Italian songs, film music, Christmas music, and tangos.

In 1993 he was awarded with Beniamino Gigli Prize.

Raimo Sirkiä was the Artistic Director of the Savonlinna Opera Festival from 2002 to 2007, where his new productions included Turandot and Lucia di Lammermoor, and the commissioned Isän tyttö composed by Olli Kortekangas, which subsequently has been played also at the Finnish National Opera. Raimo Sirkiä began the popular children's opera series at the festival and commissioned works from several Finnish composers. Sirkiä was the Artist of the Year of the Festival in 1996, a recognition of his contribution as a singer at the Festival since 1981.

Sirkiä was awarded the Pro Finlandia medal by the president of Finland in 2003, and the Savonlinna City award 2007.

Sirkiä has acted as a vocal coach, training young tenors. He retired from the Finnish National Opera in 2006 and now primarily gives concerts worldwide.

== Discography ==
- Jää mun lähellein/Serenadeja (Fazer/Warner -84/-97)
- Opera Arias (Ondine -92)
- Amado Mio (Ondine -94)
- Mahler 8th Symphony (Chandos -94)
- Valkea joulu (Ondine -96)
- Lemmen Virtaa (Tonus Art -97)
- Juha (Ondine -95)
- Pohjalaisia (Finlandia -98)
- Die Feen (Dynamic -98)
- Oskar Merikanto-Elämälle (Taidekeskus Salmela -99)
- Loreley (Bis -03)
- Mare and Her Son (Ondine -05)
- Der fliegende Holländer Video (Amaya -89/DVD -04)
