= Campli =

- Comune
- Città di Campli

- Location within Italy Location within Abruzzo
- Coordinates: 42°43′34.07″N 13°41′9.92″E
- Country: Italy
- Region: Abruzzo
- Province: Teramo (TE)
- Frazioni: Battaglia, Boceto, Campiglio, Campovalano, Cesenà, Cognoli, Collicelli, Fichieri, Floriano, Friscoli, Gagliano, Garrufo, Guazzano, La Traversa, Masseri, Molviano, Morge, Nocella, Paduli, Pagannoni Inferiore, Pagannoni Superiore, Paterno, Piancarani, Roiano, Sant'Onofrio, Terrabianca, Traversa, Villa Camera

Government
  - Mayor: Federico Agostinelli (Ind.)

Area
  - Total: 73 km^{2} (28 sq mi)
- Elevation: 393 m (1,289 ft)

Population (30 November 2014)
  - Total: 7,279
  - Density: 100/km^{2} (260/sq mi)
- Demonym: Camplesi
- Time zone: UTC+1 (CET)
  - Summer (DST): UTC+2 (CEST)
- Postal code: 64012
- Dialing code: 0861
- Patron saint: Saint Pancras
- Saint day: 10 May
- Website: Official website

Campli (Abruzzese: Chimblë) is a town and comune in the province of Teramo, in the Abruzzo region of central Italy. It is located in the natural park known as the Gran Sasso e Monti della Laga National Park. It is one of I Borghi più belli d'Italia ("The most beautiful villages of Italy").

== Geography ==
The towns of Bellante, Civitella del Tronto, Sant'Omero, Teramo, Torricella Sicura, Valle Castellana are nearby.

Side street in Campli

== History ==
During the 14th century, the composer Nicolaus Ricii de Nucella Campli was born presumably in or near the town.

The French captured the town under François de Guise in 1557 during his failed campaign against the Spanish in the Kingdom of Naples.

== Festivals and events ==
Every year since 1964 in the month of August, there is a celebration that goes by the name of Sagra della porchetta italica (Feast of Italian Pork). It is considered to be the first such event established in the Region of Abruzzo and one of the earliest organized in all of Italy. One highlight of this festival is a pork sandwich cookoff. The festival was founded by Fernando Aurini who was seeking to attract tourists and disseminate information about the town which once comprised a portion of the holdings of the powerful Farnese family. A practical tourist guide entitled "Campli" was published each year to celebrate this event. The Sagra della porchetta italica was an immediate success with crowds of up to 10,000 people attending in the mid 1960s.

== Main sights ==
- Museo Nazionale Archeologico (National Archeological Museum) - housed in the ancient 14th century Farnese palace
- San Pietro (Church of Saint Peter): its walls contain Ancient Roman and High Medieval stone fragments
- La Scala Santa (The Sacred Step), formed by 28 wooden steps which, if climbed on ones knees, bring absolution of sins by decree of Pope Clement IV- Located behind Palazzo Farnese, next to the fourteenth-century Church of San Paolo, the Sanctuary of the Holy Staircase attracts thousands of devotees every year. The Sanctuary houses a Holy Staircase which in 1772 Pope Clement XIV granted the same indulgences of the famous Holy Staircase of Rome. Pope John Paul II extended the benefits granted in the 18th century to all Fridays of Lent.
- The convent of Sant'Onofrio

The staircase is completely surrounded by frescoes with motifs related to the Passion of Christ: while the ceiling is populated by images of angels carrying the symbols of the Passion, it is possible to admire on the right "Christ in the Garden of Olives", "The Flagellation" and "Christ Carrying the Cross" and on the left "The Capture", "Ecce homo", and the "Crucifixion". Some of them and the whole decoration of the ceiling are attributed to the painter from Teramo Vincenzo Baldati (1759 - 1825).
