= Vivian Della Chiesa =

American opera singer

Vivian Della Chiesa (October 9, 1915 – January 6, 2009) was an American lyric soprano who achieved a high level of popularity in the United States singing on the radio during the 1940s and the early 1950s.

Della Chiesa performed a wide variety of classical and popular works from opera to musical theatre, jazz, and popular songs. She sang on a number of radio programs during her career, including The American Album of Familiar Music, The American Melody Hour, and The Standard Hour among others. A particularly important triumph for her radio career was a 1943 radio concert of Brahms’s Deutsches Requiem with conductor Arturo Toscanini and the NBC Symphony Orchestra.

In addition to her radio career, Della Chiesa performed actively on the opera stage, mostly at the Chicago City Opera Company and the Chicago Opera Company, during the 1930s and 1940s. In the 1950s, she became a successful nightclub singer, headlining at major clubs in Las Vegas, Reno, and in major venues in other cities throughout the United States. After her singing career ended she worked as a voice teacher and a fundraiser for charity.

== Early life and education ==
Della Chiesa was born into an Italian family in Chicago. Her mother, Dulia (Morelli) Della Chiesa, was an accomplished pianist, whose father had been a conductor in Italy., and who initiated Vivienne's training in piano at an early age. Vivian Della Chiesa also studied singing and violin and was, by age 10, interested in opera. She also studied foreign languages, gymnastics and dancing. She attended the Roosevelt High School in East Chicago, Indiana, and the Chicago Musical College.

While in her teens Della Chiesa studied for three years with Marion Claire of the Chicago Opera Company. These lessons were financed by "a rich woman who was a philanthropist.". Studies began with Forrest Lamont, formerly a leading tenor of the Chicago Opera, in 1934, and continued until his death at the end of 1937.

== Career ==
In 1935, Della Chiesa entered and won a large contest sponsored by WBBM, the Chicago affiliate of the CBS network. Her prize was a $100 a week contract to appear on thirteen weekly radio programs. These appearances led to an invitation from Paul Longone, the impresario of the Chicago Opera, to audition. Della Chiesa obtained an engagement with the company for three years. Her Chicago debut occurred on November 15, 1936, as Mimi in La Bohème. She also appeared with the company as Adina, (L’Elisir D’Amore), Micaela (Carmen), Marguerite (Faust) and Eudoxie (La Juive). In 1943, she twice sang under the baton of the composer Italo Montemezzi in his own works - L'Amore dei tre re (Fiora) and, on October 9, in the first performance of L’Incantesimo (Giselda) with the NBC Symphony. She sang with the San Francisco Opera in 1944 (Falstaff - Alice; Faust - Marguerite) and in 1945 (Boris Godunov - Marina (in Italian with Ezio Pinza); Cavalleria Rusticana - Santuzza; Don Giovanni - Donna Elvira; La Bohème - Mimi). Della Chiesa also appeared with the St. Louis Opera, the Cincinnati Opera and the Havana International Opera. She appeared with the New York City Opera in 1947 as Maddalena in Andrea Chenier.

Della Chiesa also appeared as a soloist with the Chicago Symphony and the Toronto Symphony Orchestra. Her appearances with the NBC Symphony Orchestra under Arturo Toscanini in 1943 were a high point in her career. Opera News considers her to be “best remembered for her 1943 radio concert of Brahms’s Ein Deutsches Requiem" in that series.

Radio was an important part of Della Chiesa's career. An offer of sponsorship appeared early in the series of radio broadcasts resulting from the CBS contest of 1935. Throughout the 1940s and early 1950s she sang a mixture of popular and classical music on shows such as the Carnation Hour, the Magic Key, the Firestone Hour, Album of Familiar Music (Bayer Aspirin), American Melody Hour and Standard Hour. At one point “I was on CBS, NBC and Mutual at the same time,” she told Diane Ketcham. She performed the national anthem before the sixth and final game of the 1959 World Series at Comiskey Park in Chicago, not far from where she resided at the time. During the late 1960s, she spent a brief time as an afternoon television show hostess on Cincinnati's WLWT. Her career eventually made the transition into featured attraction at supper clubs such as the Empire Room at the Waldorf-Astoria (New York) and night clubs. “Vivienne Della Chiesa” is listed among celebrity performers at the Deauville, a Miami Beach hotel, in 1970. In retirement, she was active in community musical affairs and taught voice.

== Personal life ==
Della Chiesa moved to Huntington, Long Island in the late 1950s, bringing her widowed mother with her. She shared her home with her widowed sister, niece and nephew for an extended period of time. She married three times. Her third husband, Alfred J. Ré, predeceased her.

== Death ==
She died on January 6, 2009, at a nursing home in Huntington, Long Island, New York. She is buried in the St. Patrick Cemetery in Huntington.

== Legacy ==
=== In popular culture ===
Judy Garland mentioned Vivian della Chiesa by name in her Carnegie Hall concert of January 23, 1961, preserved in the Judy at Carnegie Hall album. Garland says, “I must tell you one more thing, about, in Paris again. I got to the intermission, and I changed my dress and got into my pants and in my slacks, and the zipper in the back wouldn’t stay zipped. And so, just before I went on, I put a great big safety pin, you know, so my act wouldn’t get too gay in the middle of it, and I strolled over to the piano at this point and sat down and the pin . . . came undone, and into my derrière. I’ve never sung so high and so fast in my . . . I sounded like Vivian, Vivian Della Chiesa.”

== Partial discography ==
=== CD ===
- Brahms, Johannes. Requiem. Arturo Toscanini, NBC Symphony Orchestra, Westminster Choir, Herbert Janssen, baritone, Vivian Della Chiesa, soprano. Guild, GHCD 2290 Live broadcast of January 24, 1943.
- Verdi, Giuseppe. Falstaff. Renato Cellini, New Orleans Opera, Leonard Warren as Falstaff, Vivian Della Chiesa as Alice. VAI Audio
- Montemezzi, Italo. L'incantesimo. World premiere recording with the NBC Symphony under the composer's baton. Souvenirs from Verismo Operas Volume 4 on the IRCC label.

=== LP ===
- Verdi, Giuseppe. "I Lombardi Act III, 'Qui, posa il fianco….Qual volutta trascorrere'". Arturo Toscanini, NBC Symphony Orchestra; Vivian Della Chiesa, soprano, as Giselda; Jan Peerce, tenor, as Oronte; Nicola Moscona, bass, as the Hermit. Live Broadcast of January 31, 1943. RCA Victor LM-6041.
- Come Rain, Come Shine. 20th Century Fox Records TFM 3140
