= Finnish Beniamino Gigli Club =

American membership-only warehouse club chain

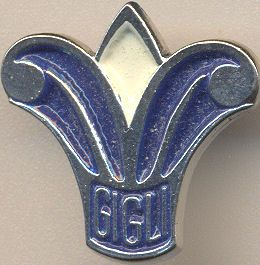

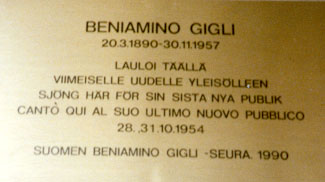
- Commemorative plaque of Beniamino Gigli's visit to Helsinki on the wall of the Töölö Sports Hall.
- Trade name: Suomen Beniamino Gigli - seura
- Founded: 1985
- Founder: Torsten Brander
- Headquarters: Helsinki
- Members: 143
- Website: www.gigli.fi

Finnish Beniamino Gigli Club (Finnish: "Suomen Beniamino Gigli - seura") is a Finnish society, founded in 1985 to promote the life work of the tenore Beniamino Gigli. It engages in cultural exchange between Finland and Italy by organizing opportunities for Finnish singers to sing in Recanati and, correspondingly, opportunities for Italian singers to sing at Beniamino Gigli memorial concerts in Finland.

The society also maintains relations with Recanati and Beniamino Gigli's art lovers around the world, and strives to support young talented Finnish opera singers.

== History ==
The club was founded on 26 February 1985 by Torsten Brander and Pentti Rajaheimo. The first board also included vice-chairman Jari Paavilainen, housekeeper Paula Brander and members Mikael Brander and Kyösti Lampinen. Anne Paavilainen and Jarmo Rönnqvist were elected auditors, and Jorma Rajaheimo and Irma Witikka as their deputies.

== Beniamino Gigli Prize ==
In 1993, the board of Society decided to establish the Beniamino Gigli Prize. The award can be granted to an artist who has merited the work done for Beniamino Gigli. There have been 27 recipients of the Beniamino Gigli award between 1990 and 2018.

== Publications ==
- Torsten Brander: Beniamino Giglin juhlavuosi 1990. Suomen Beniamino Gigli -seura, 1991. ISBN 952-90-3233-1.
- Torsten Brander: Beniamino Gigli. Il tenore di Recanati. Helsinki: Suomen Beniamino Gigli -seura, 2001. ISBN 952-91-3542-4.
- Torsten Brander: Kaksi vuosikymmentä bel canton uranuurtajana. Seuran 20-vuotisjuhlakirja. Suomen Beniamino Gigli -seura, 2005. ISBN 952-91-8178-7.
- Torsten Brander: Suomen suurin tenori Peter Lindroos. Peter Lindroosin muistokirja. Suomen Beniamino Gigli -seura, 2011. ISBN 978-952-92-9061-1.
- Brander, Torsten: Bel canton juhlaa. Suomen Beniamino Gigli-seura ry, 2015. ISBN 978-952-93-4751-3.
