= The Jester's Supper (film) =

1942 film

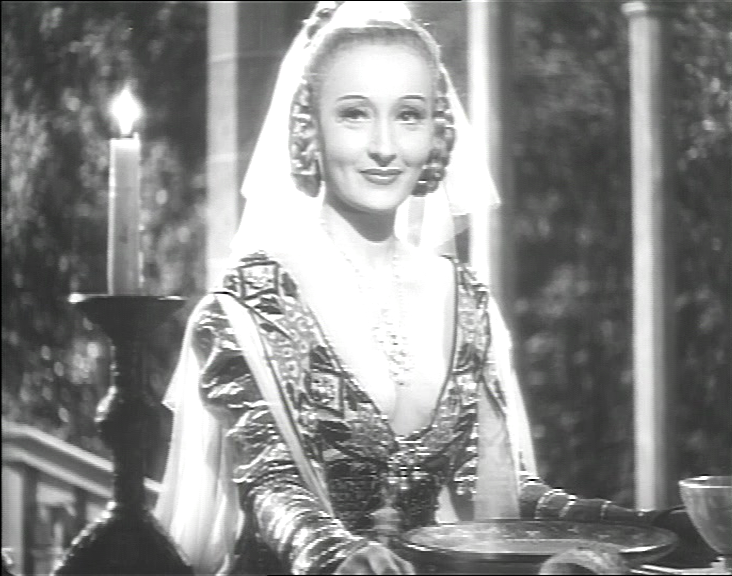
- Clara Calamai in the film
- Directed by: Alessandro Blasetti
- Written by: Sem Benelli (play); Renato Castellani; Alessandro Blasetti
- Produced by: Giuseppe Amato
- Starring: Amedeo Nazzari; Osvaldo Valenti; Clara Calamai; Alfredo Varelli
- Cinematography: Mario Craveri
- Edited by: Mario Serandrei
- Music by: Giuseppe Becce
- Production company: Società Italiana Cines
- Distributed by: ENIC
- Release date: 9 February 1942
- Running time: 87 minutes
- Country: Italy
- Language: Italian

The Jester's Supper (Italian: La cena delle beffe) is a 1942 Italian historical film directed by Alessandro Blasetti and starring Amedeo Nazzari, Osvaldo Valenti and Clara Calamai. It was based on a play of the same title by Sem Benelli, which had later been turned into an opera by Umberto Giordano. Like the play, the film is set in the 15th century Florence of Lorenzo the Magnificent and portrays a rivalry that leads to a series of increasingly violent practical jokes.

== Production and reception ==
It was shot at Cinecittà in Rome partly using sets that had been constructed for Blasetti's earlier The Iron Crown which was set in the same era. Amedeo Nazzari, the leading Italian star of the decade, was cast strongly against type. Usually Nazzari played romantic heroes or action men, but in the film he plays a loutish character and appeared without his trademark moustache. A popular catchphrase associated with Nazzari originated in the film: "a plague on anyone who refuses to drink with me!"

The film was extremely popular and boosted the career of Clara Calamai in particular. In one scene her dress is ripped off by Nazzari, briefly exposing her breasts in one of the first topless scenes in Italian cinema. It was one of several films in which Osvaldo Valenti and Luisa Ferida, later executed in 1945, appeared together.

== Cast ==
- Amedeo Nazzari as Neri Chiaramantesi
- Osvaldo Valenti as Giannetto Malespini
- Clara Calamai as Ginevra
- Alfredo Varelli as Gabriello Chiaramantesi
- Valentina Cortese as Lisabetta
- Memo Benassi as Il Tornaquinci
- Piero Carnabuci as Fazio
- Elisa Cegani as Laldòmine
- Luisa Ferida as Fiammetta
- Alberto Capozzi as Luca
- Lauro Gazzolo as Il Trinca
- Nietta Zocchi as Cinzia
- Silvio Bagolini as Il terzo cerusico
- Aldo Silvani as Il primo cerusico
- Umberto Sacripante as Il secondo cerusico
- Gildo Bocci as Il taverniere
- Antonio Acqua as Lapo
- Margherita Bagni as Una dama alla festa
- Ernesto Bianchi as Un servitore della taverna
- Lilla Brignone as Una dama alla festa
- Anna Carena as La moglie del taverniere
- Adele Garavaglia as La nonna di Lisabetta
- Carlo Minello as Un messere alla taverna
- Milla Papa as Una fantesca

== Bibliography ==
- Gundle, Stephen (2013). Mussolini's Dream Factory: Film Stardom in Fascist Italy. New York-Oxford: Berghahn Books. ISBN 978-1-78-238244-7.
- Moliterno, Gino (2009). The A to Z of Italian Cinema. Lanham, Maryland: Scarecrow Press. ISBN 978-0810870598.
