= The Jester's Supper (play) =

1909 play

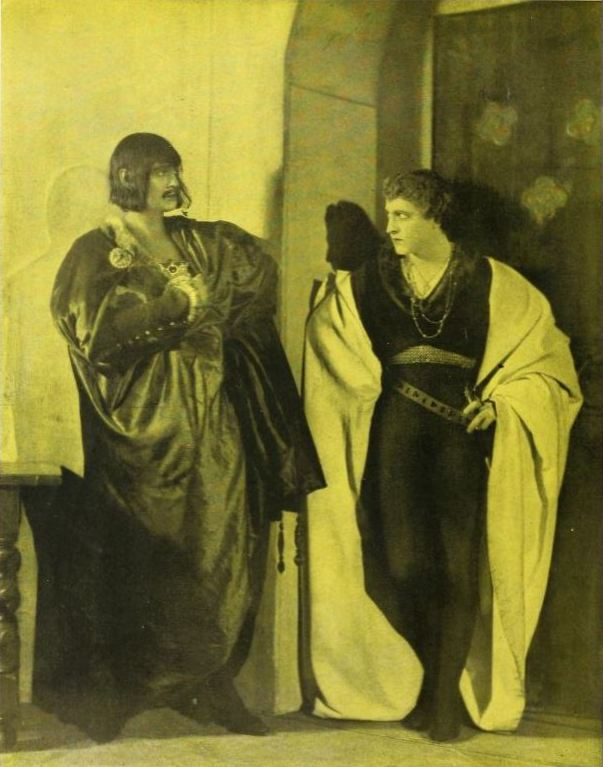
Lionel Barrymore and John Barrymore in the 1919 Broadway production of The Jest

The Jester's Supper (Italian:La cena delle beffe) is a historical play by the Italian writer Sem Benelli, which was first staged in 1909. The work is inspired by a short story from Antonio Francesco Grazzini's Le Cene (I, 3).

In 1910 Sara Bernhardt played in "La Beffa" (adapted by Jean Richepin) the role of Gianetto Malespini.

In 1919 the play was put on in New York City, under the name The Jest, adapted by Edward Sheldon, at Broadway's Plymouth Theatre. The play portrays a violent and cruel rivalry in the Florence of Lorenzo the Magnificent. This production starred John Barrymore and Lionel Barrymore. They added an element of surprise by exchanging the lead roles on certain nights without alerting the audience.

== Adaptations ==
=== Opera ===
The play was the basis for an opera La cena delle beffe composed by Umberto Giordano with a libretto written by Benelli himself. It premiered at La Scala on 20 December 1924.

=== Film ===
In 1942 the play was adapted as a film, The Jester's Supper, directed by Alessandro Blasetti and starring Amedeo Nazzari and Osvaldo Valenti. It was made at Cinecittà in Rome. The film was a popular success.

== Bibliography ==
- Gundle, Stephen (2013). Mussolini's Dream Factory: Film Stardom in Fascist Italy. New York-Oxford: Berghahn Books. ISBN 978-1782382447.
- Sassoon, Donald (2006). Culture of the Europeans: From 1800 to the Present. London: Harper Press. ISBN 978-0002558792.
