= Compagnacci =

15th century religious/political faction

Compagnacci was a group or political faction numbering one hundred fifty men in Florence, Italy. They were opposed to Girolamo Savonarola, a Dominican friar who came to dominate Florentine religious life and politics in the 1490s. Along with Pope Alexander VI they were a crucial part of Savonarola's demise in the early spring of 1498.

The Compagnacci were also known as the Rude, Rowdy or Ugly Companions. Their leader was a nobleman named Dolfo Spini. He was assisted in his opposition to Savonarola by two Medici brothers of the cadet branch, one of whom married a Sforza princess. The Compagnacci were dedicated pleasure seekers who dressed finely and partied with music as an accompaniment. Their influence was reinforced by support they picked up during street demonstrations. In time the Compagnacci won votes in the Great Council.

== In popular culture ==
An opera, I Compagnacci, was written by Italian composer Primo Riccitelli in the early twentieth century and performed in Rome, at the Teatro Costanzi, and by the Metropolitan Opera.
