= Garrufo =

Coordinates: 42°47′57″N 13°45′56″E

- Frazione
- Interactive map of Garrufo
- Country: Italy
- Region: Abruzzo
- Province: Teramo
- Time zone: UTC+1 (CET)
  - Summer (DST): UTC+2 (CEST)

Garrufo is a frazione in the Province of Teramo in the Abruzzo region of Italy. Located in Val Vibrata, where urban development is very recent. Garrufo is located west of the capital city,
