= Sant'Onofrio, Campli =

Sant'Onofrio
- Frazione
- Interactive map of Sant'Onofrio
- Coordinates: 42°45′37″N 13°44′13″E
- Country: Italy
- Region: Abruzzo
- Province: Teramo
- Commune: Campli
- Time zone: UTC+1 (CET)
  - Summer (DST): UTC+2 (CEST)

Sant'Onofrio is a frazione (borough) in the municipality of Campli, Province of Teramo, in the Abruzzo region of Italy.
