= Fabio Armiliato =

Italian tenor (born 1956)

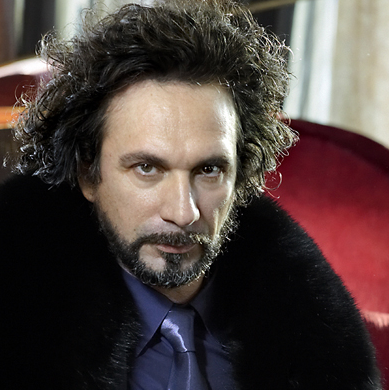
Armiliato in 2010

Fabio Armiliato (born 17 August 1956) is an Italian operatic tenor.

== Career ==
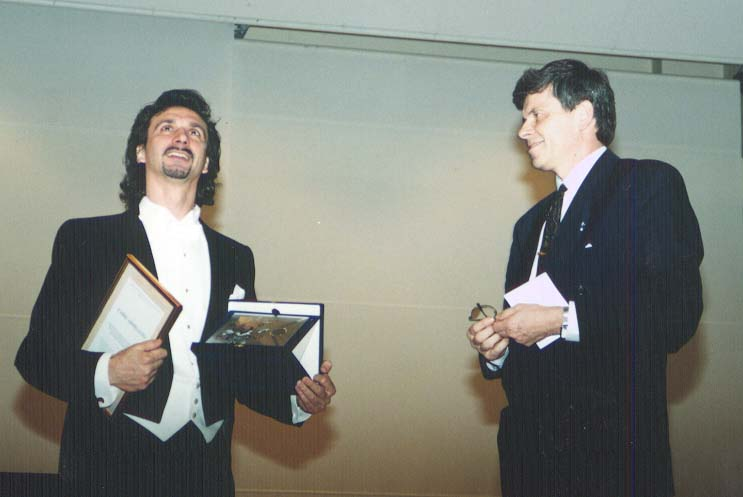
Armiliato receiving the Beniamino Gigli Prize in 2000

Armillato was born in Genoa.

In 1992 he sang the role of Mario Cavaradossi at the Vlaamse Opera. The conductor was Silvio Varviso. In 1993, he debuted in the Metropolitan Opera House in New York in Il trovatore, returning later in Aida and Madama Butterfly. He has also performed in the Teatro alla Scala, Milan, in the Opéra de Paris, and in San Francisco Opera. He performed Madama Butterfly in La Scala, in the Puccini Festival in Torre del Lago, and in the New National Theatre Tokyo. He worked with Zubin Mehta in a five-act version of Don Carlo in Munich and Florence. In 2000 he was awarded with Beniamino Gigli Prize.

In the 2007/08 season, he made a debut as Alvaro in La forza del destino in Monte Carlo, followed by La fanciulla del West in Rome and Norma in Bologna; in 2008/09, he performed Tosca in Florence, Adriana Lecouvreur in Palermo and La fanciulla del West in Seville. In 2008, he participated in the Puccini 150th Anniversary Gala Concert in New York.

In 2012, he appeared in the Woody Allen film To Rome with Love as a man with fantastic operatic voice, but only while in the shower.

His partner was the soprano Daniela Dessì, with whom he frequently performed and recorded.

== Selected discography ==
- I Vespri Siciliani (Giuseppe Verdi), recorded 2010 for the Verdi Bicentenary, with Daniela Dessì, and Leo Nucci, Orchestra of Teatro Regio Di Parma, Massimo Zanetti (conductor).
- La traviata: Fabio Armiliato (tenor), Daniela Dessì (soprano), John Neschling (conductor)
- Andrea Chénier: Fabio Armiliato (tenor), Daniela Dessì (soprano), Carlo Guelfi (baritone), Vjekoslav Šutej (conductor), Universal 2008.
- Romanze e Canzoni: Fabio Armiliato (tenor), Steven Mercurio (conductor), Decca 2007.
- Love Duets: Fabio Armiliato (tenor), Daniela Dessì (soprano), Marco Boemi (conductor), Philips 2005.
- Madama Butterfly: Fabio Armiliato (tenor), Daniela Dessì (soprano), Juan Pons (baritone), Plácido Domingo (conductor), Dynamic.
- Tosca: Fabio Armiliato (tenor), Daniela Dessì (soprano), Opus Arte 2004.
- Manon Lescaut: Fabio Armiliato (tenor), Daniela Dessì (soprano), Real Sound 2004.
- Aida: Fabio Armiliato (tenor), Daniela Dessì (soprano), Opus Arte 2004.
- Le Romanze ritrovate: Fabio Armiliato (tenor), Daniela Dessì (soprano), Real Sound 2004.
- A Tribute to Verdi: Fabio Armiliato (tenor), Marcello Panni (conductor), Real Sound 2001.
