= L'amore dei tre re =

Italo Montemezzi's opera

- Opera by Italo Montemezzi
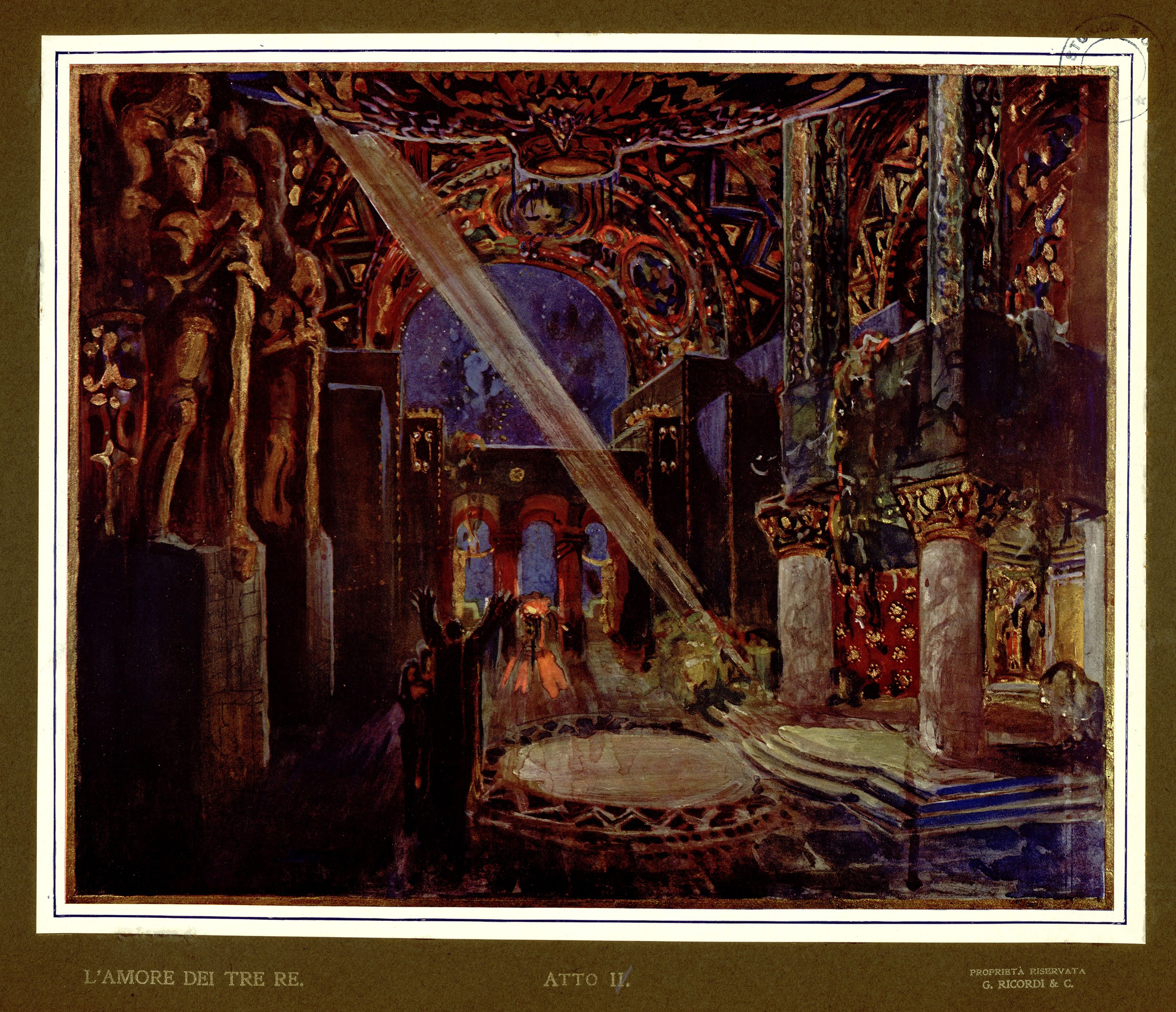
- Set design for act 1 in the 1913 premiere
- Translation: The Love of the Three Kings
- Librettist: Sem Benelli
- Language: Italian
- Based on: Sem Benelli's play
- Premiere: 10 April 1913; La Scala, Milan

L'amore dei tre re (The Love of the Three Kings) is an opera in three acts by Italo Montemezzi. Its Italian-language libretto was written by playwright Sem Benelli who based it on his play of the same title.

== Performance history ==
L'amore dei tre re premiered at La Scala in Milan on 10 April 1913. It received mixed reviews, but quickly became an international success, especially in the United States, where it became a staple of the repertory for several decades. The opera received its Spanish premiere in Madrid at Teatro Real on 3 March 1915, featuring Antonio Cortis; its American premiere in New York at the Metropolitan Opera followed on 14 March 1918 with Enrico Caruso, Claudia Muzio and Pasquale Amato. After the Second World War, the frequency of performances declined dramatically, and it was not performed in the US for nearly 30 years. It is still performed only rarely.

== Roles ==
Roles, voice types, premiere cast
Role	Voice type	Premiere cast, 10 April 1913 Conductor: Tullio Serafin
Archibaldo, King of Altura	bass	Nazzareno De Angelis
Manfredo, his son	baritone	Carlo Galeffi
Fiora, Manfredo's wife	soprano	Luisa Villani
Avito, former Prince of Altura	tenor	Edoardo Ferrari-Fontana
Flaminio, a castle guard	tenor	Giordano Paltrinieri
A Handmaiden	soprano	Fernanda Guelpi
A Young Woman	soprano	Enrica Merli
A Youth	tenor	Cesare Spadoni
An Old Woman	mezzo-soprano	Rosa Garavaglia
An Offstage Voice	boy soprano	
People of Altura

== Synopsis ==
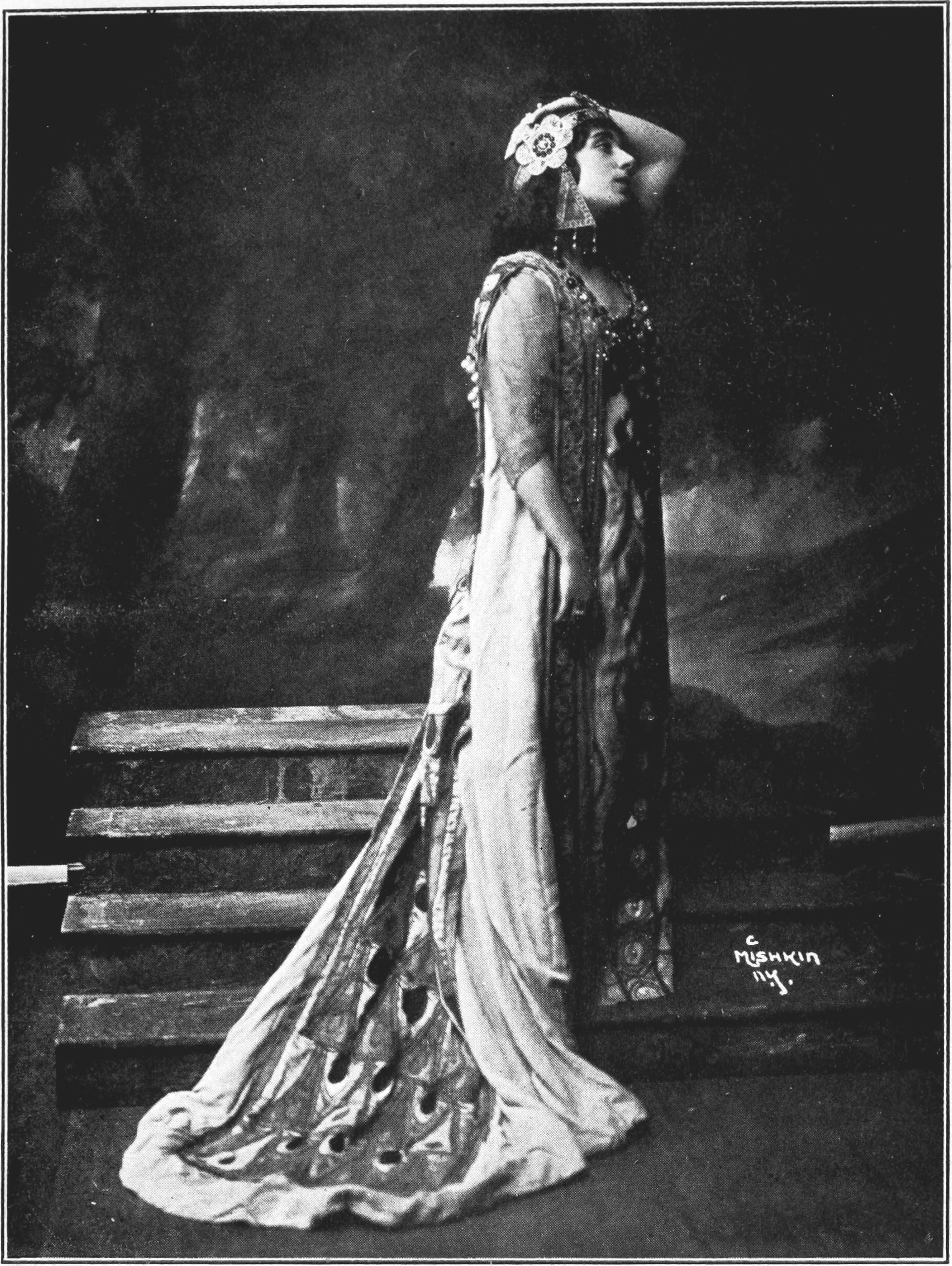
Lucrezia Bori in L'amore dei tre re

Time: The Dark Ages
Place: Italy

Archibaldo, the blind king, conquered the kingdom of Altura forty years before the opera begins. After forty years, the Alturan people openly object to the reign of the Germanic Archibaldo. Archibaldo recounts his memories of the thrill of conquest, and his reminiscence equates the invasion of Italy to the winning of a beautiful woman.

The story unfolds as we learn that Archibaldo's son Manfredo has been married to the native Alturan princess Fiora. But Fiora is having an affair with another Alturan prince, Avito. Although Archibaldo suspects Fiora of infidelity, he falls short of proof, since he is blind, and his own Alturan servants do not cooperate with him in uncovering the affair.

In the first two acts there are various scenarios played out with mounting intensity. There are two love duets between Avito and Fiora, and a scene in which Manfredo pours out his love for Fiora and begs her to show him affection. All of these are interspersed with scenes in which Archibaldo questions Fiora. Finally, enraged, Archibaldo strangles her at the end of the second act.

In the final act, Fiora's body is laid in a crypt, and the people of Altura mourn for her. Archibaldo has secretly poisoned Fiora's lips, so that her lover will die. Avito kisses Fiora's lips. As he dies from the poison, Avito reveals to Manfredo that he was Fiora's lover, and that Archibaldo has laid the poison. Stricken with grief at the loss of the woman he loved, Manfredo also kisses Fiora's lips. Finally, Archibaldo enters to see if his trap has caught Fiora's lover, and despairs as he hears the voice of his dying son.

== Music ==
The music of the opera is lush and complex. Similar to works such as Debussy's Pelléas et Mélisande, the orchestra frequently reveals the subtext of the interactions between the characters. Montemezzi himself held that Archibaldo is not only suspicious of Fiora, but also desires her himself. The orchestration, in surges of rich density, also marks how characters move into states of very deep passion. When the characters are moved into these states, the music has a very distinct, transcendent and dreamlike quality.

== Recordings ==
- 1941 – Grace Moore, Charles Kullman, Richard Bonelli, Ezio Pinza, New York MET, Italo Montemezzi – (Eklipse, 15 February 1941)
- 1951 – Clara Petrella, Amedeo Berdini, Renato Capecchi, Sesto Bruscantini, Milan RAI Lyric Orchestra, Arturo Basile – (Cetra Records, 1951)
- 1969 – Luisa Malagrida, Pierre Duval, Enzo Sordello, Ezio Flagello, Orchestra Sinfonica e Coro di Roma, Richard Karp – (Delphi, 1969)
- 1973 – Ileana Meriggioli, Pedro Lavirgen, Attilio D'Orazi, Dimiter Petkov. L'Orchestra e Coro Gran Teatro del Liceo Barcelona, Ivo Savini, 24 November 1973 (Arkadia HO 607.2)
- 1974 – Virginia Zeani, Ennio Buoso, Giulio Fioravanti, Nicola Rossi-Lemeni Orchestra e Coro della RAI Milano, Maurizio Arena, 28 March 1974 (House of Opera, New York)
- 1976 – Anna Moffo, Plácido Domingo, Pablo Elvira, Cesare Siepi, Ryland Davies, Ambrosian Opera Chorus, London Symphony Orchestra, Nello Santi – (RCA Red Seal, July 1976)

== See also ==
- La nave, 1918 opera by Montemezzi
- L'incantesimo, 1943 opera by Montemezzi
