= Italo Montemezzi =

Italian composer (1875–1952)

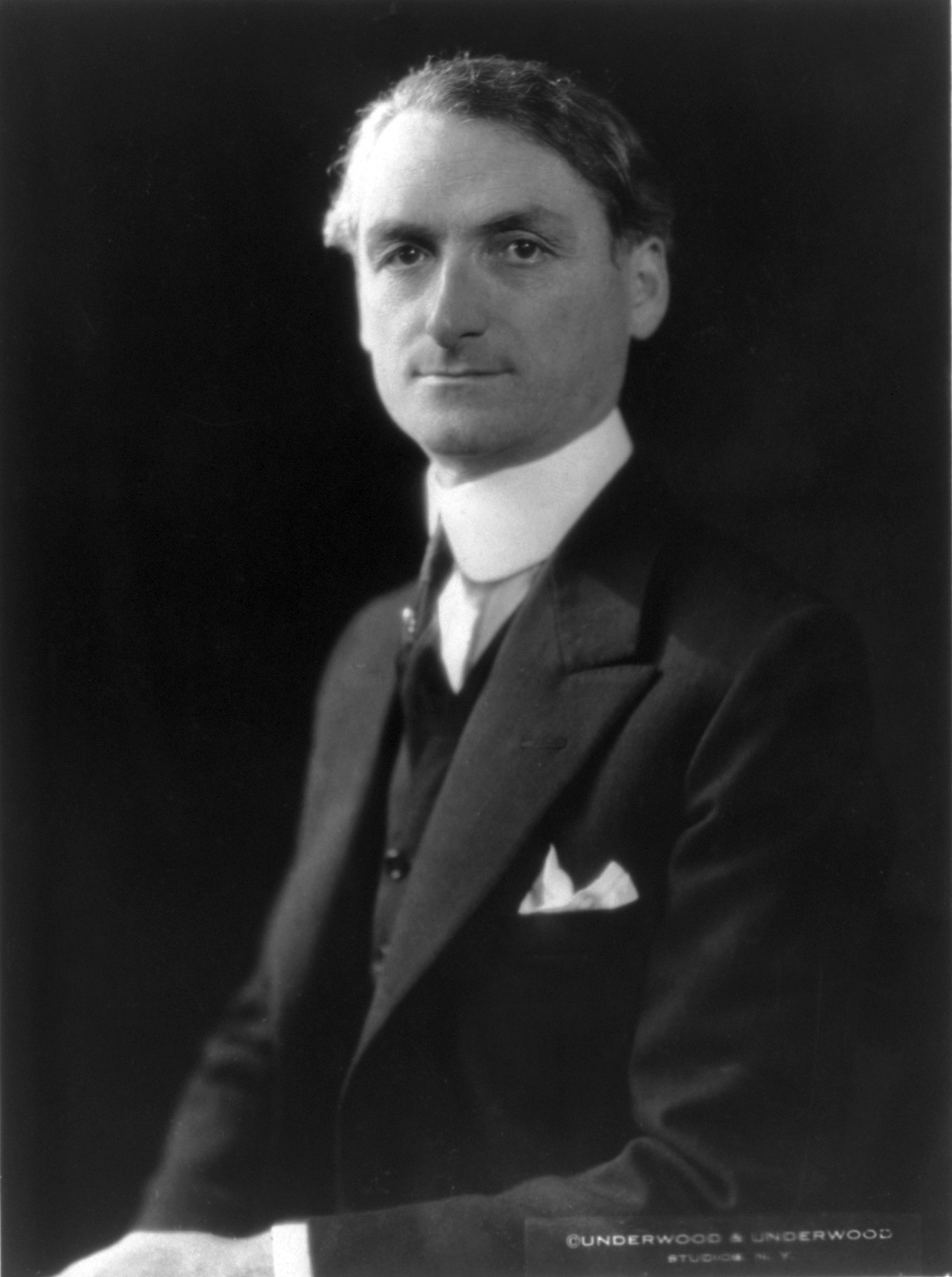
Italo Montemezzi

Italo Montemezzi (August 4, 1875 – May 15, 1952) was an Italian composer. He is best known for his opera L'amore dei tre re (The Love of the Three Kings), once part of the standard repertoire. It is now seldom performed.

== Biography ==
Montemezzi was born in Vigasio, near Verona. He studied music at the Milan Conservatory and subsequently taught harmony there for one year.

His opera L’amore dei tre re, written in 1913, launched his career and enabled him to devote himself to composition. His opera La nave had its world premiere in Milan in 1918. In 1919 he visited the United States, conducting the American premiere of La nave at the Chicago Opera Association on November 18. He lived in California from 1939 and commemorated Italy's surrender with Italia mia (1944), but later made frequent trips to Italy. He returned permanently in 1949 and died in Vigasio three years later.

Other non-operatic works include the symphonic poem Paolo e Virginia (after Paul et Virginie) and the cantata The Song of Songs.

As a composer, Montemezzi was admired for combining traditional Italian lyricism with a Wagnerian approach to the use of the orchestra in opera, with instrumental color influenced by the works of Debussy.

== Operas ==
- Bianca 1901 (never performed)
- Giovanni Gallurese (Turin, 1905)
- Hellera (Turin, 1909)
- San Pantaleone (Milan, 1910)
- L'amore dei tre re (Milan, 1913; New York, 1914)
- La nave (Milan, 1918) Piano score at Sibley Music Library
- La notte di Zoraima 1931 reviewed in Time magazine
- L'incantesimo 1943
- La Principessa Lontana (incomplete)
