= George Cehanovsky =

American opera singer

George Cehanovsky (14 April 1892 – 25 March 1986) was a Russian, Soviet and American baritone and language coach who had a close association with the Metropolitan Opera in New York City for six decades.

At the time of his death in 1986, he held the record for the most performances given by any artist at the Met with 2,394 performances, a number which has since been surpassed by only tenor Charles Anthony and conductor James Levine.

== Life and career ==
Born in St. Petersburg, Cehanovsky was the son of Russian gentry. He studied at the Russian Naval Academy before serving as an officer in the Imperial Russian Navy during World War I. With the outbreak of the Russian Revolution in 1917 he resigned his naval commission and began studying singing seriously with his mother, Vera Cehanovska, a violinist, pianist and voice teacher. He made his professional debut as a concert singer in Saint Petersburg in 1920, and spent the next couple years performing with a small opera company in that city. In 1922 Vera, concerned with the political state of her country, fled Russia through Tiflis and ultimately settled in Istanbul, Turkey. Cehanovsky joined her later that year and began performing with small opera companies in Turkey soon after.

A performance for the American Red Cross in the autumn of 1922 led to Cehanovsky's acquaintance with the wife of the American Ambassador to Turkey. She befriended him and arranged for both him and his mother to get visas to the United States. The pair arrived in New York City on December 6, 1922. After arriving they contacted one of Vera's former pupils, Thalia Sabanieeva, then a leading soprano at the Metropolitan Opera. She helped Cehanovsky get auditions with several companies, and he soon obtained work touring with Fortune Gallo's San Carlo Opera Company, mainly in small to midsized roles, from 1923 to 1926.

In 1926 Cehanovsky auditioned for Artur Bodanzky, chief conductor of the German wing of the Metropolitan Opera, and was hired as a comprimario baritone after he heard him sing only two measures. He made his debut with the company on November 13, 1926, as Kothner in Richard Wagner's Die Meistersinger von Nürnberg notably sharing the stage that evening with his future wife, soprano Elisabeth Rethberg, whom he would marry nearly 30 years later. He continued to perform at the Met for the next 40 years. Most of the 97 roles he performed at the Met were comprimario roles. He notably created roles in the world premieres of Deems Taylor's The King's Henchman (Cynric, 1927), Taylor's Peter Ibbetson (1931, Prison Governor), Howard Hanson's Merry Mount (Thomas Morton, 1934), Walter Damrosch's The Man Without a Country (1937, Lieutenant Reeve), and Samuel Barber's Vanessa (1958, Nicholas). He also sang roles in the United States premieres of Turandot (Mandarin, 1926), Jonny spielt auf (policeman, 1929), Fra Gherardo (1929, Podestà's Assessor), Sadko (Apparition, 1930), The Fair at Sorochyntsi (Gypsy, 1930), and Caponsacchi (1937, Venturini). His final performance with the company was for the Gala Farewell concert, the last performance given at the "Old Met", on April 16, 1966.

Following his retirement from the stage, Cehanovsky continued to work for the Met as a Russian language coach starting with Boris Godunov in 1976. He continued to work in that capacity on every Russian language work the company presented up until the time of his death. The last opera he served as a language coach for was the Met's 1985 production of Eugene Onegin.

Cehanovsky died in Yorktown Heights, New York, in 1986 at the age of 93.

== Roles ==
- Angelotti (Giacomo Puccini's Tosca)
- Antonio (Ambroise Thomas's Mignon)
- Apparition (Nikolai Rimsky-Korsakov's Sadko)
- Archer (Jules Massenet's Manon)
- Baron Douphol (Giuseppe Verdi's La traviata)
- Betto (Puccini's Gianni Schicchi)
- Biterolf (Richard Wagner's Tannhäuser)
- Bookseller (Franz von Suppé's Boccaccio)
- Brétigny (Massenet's Manon)
- Captain (Giacomo Meyerbeer's Le prophète)
- Chernikovsky (Mussorgsky's Boris Godunov)
- Commissioner (Puccini's Madama Butterfly)
- Count Ceprano (Verdi's Rigoletto)
- Crebillon (Puccini's La rondine)
- Cynric (Deems Taylor's The King's Henchman)
- Dancaïre (Georges Bizet's Carmen)
- Don Fernando (Ludwig van Beethoven's Fidelio)
- Duke of Verona (Charles Gounod's Roméo et Juliette)
- Fiorello (Gioachino Rossini's The Barber of Seville)
- First Knight (Wagner's Parsifal)
- Fléville (Umberto Giordano's Andrea Chénier)
- Frédéric (Léo Delibes' Lakmé)
- Guard (Richard Hageman's Caponsacchi)
- Gypsy (Modest Mussorgsky's The Fair at Sorochyntsi)
- Gypsy (Verdi's Il trovatore)
- Handsome (Puccini's La fanciulla del West)
- Herald (Christoph Willibald Gluck's Alceste)
- Herald (Richard Wagner's Lohengrin)
- Innkeeper (Puccini's Manon Lescaut)
- Jago (Verdi's Ernani)
- Jailer (Puccini's Tosca)
- Kothner (Wagner's Die Meistersinger von Nürnberg)
- Krusina (Bedřich Smetana's The Bartered Bride)
- Kuzka (Mussorgsky's Khovanshchina)
- Leuthold (Gioachino Rossini's William Tell)
- Lieutenant Reeve (Walter Damrosch's The Man Without a Country)
- Lindorf (Offenbach's The Tales of Hoffmann)
- Luther (Offenbach's The Tales of Hoffmann)
- Major-domo (Fromental Halévy's La Juive)
- Mandarin (Puccini's Turandot)
- Marquis D'Obigny (Verdi's La traviata)
- Marullo (Verdi's Rigoletto)
- Melot (Wagner's Tristan und Isolde)
- Mercutio (Gounod's Roméo et Juliette)
- Montàno (Verdi's Otello)
- Moralès (Bizet's Carmen)
- Nicholas (Samuel Barber's Vanessa)
- Night Watchman (Wagner's Die Meistersinger von Nürnberg)
- Oracle (Gluck's Alceste)
- Paris (Gounod's Roméo et Juliette)
- Philistine (Camille Saint-Saëns' Samson and Delilah)
- Picador (von Suppé's Donna Juanita)
- Podestà's Assessor (Ildebrando Pizzetti's Fra Gherardo)
- Policeman (Ernst Krenek's Jonny spielt auf)
- Prison Governor (Taylor's Peter Ibbetson)
- Schaunard (Puccini's La bohème)
- Schlemil (Jacques Offenbach's The Tales of Hoffmann)
- Sciarrone (Puccini's Tosca)
- Second Prisoner (Beethoven's Fidelio)
- Sharpless (Puccini's Madama Butterfly)
- Shchelkalov (Modest Mussorgsky's Boris Godunov)
- Silvano (Verdi's Un ballo in maschera)
- Silvio (Ruggero Leoncavallo's Pagliacci)
- Songwriter (Gustave Charpentier's Louise)
- Speaker (Wolfgang Amadeus Mozart's The Magic Flute)
- Surgeon (Verdi's La forza del destino)
- Thomas Morton (Howard Hanson's Merry Mount)
- Usher (Giacomo Meyerbeer's L'Africaine)
- Valentin (Gounod's Faust)
- Vassal (Wagner's Götterdämmerung)
- Wagner (Gounod's Faust)
- Yamadori (Puccini's Madama Butterfly)
- Zaretsky (Pyotr Ilyich Tchaikovsky's Eugene Onegin)
- Zuàne (Amilcare Ponchielli's La Gioconda)
