= Alfredo Gandolfi =

American cinematographer and singer (1885–1963)

Alfredo Gandolfi, sometimes given as Alfred Gandolfi, (18 May 1885 – 9 June 1963) was an Italian-born American cinematographer, operatic baritone, and librettist. He should not be confused with the Alfredo Gandolfi who co-founded Ambrosio Film with Arturo Ambrosio in 1906.

A native of Turin, Gandolfi began his career as a cameraman for the Cines film company in Rome in c. 1906. He worked for a variety of film companies in Italy while training as a vocalist with the opera singer Chiarina Fino-Savio. He made his professional opera debut in Turin in 1911, and over the next five years periodically performed in operas in Italy while primarily working as a cinematographer in the United States. He notably portrayed Amfortas in the first staging in Italy of Richard Wagner's Parsifal at the Teatro Comunale di Bologna in 1914, a role he repeated at La Scala, the Teatro Regio in Turin, and the Teatro Carlo Felice.

Gandolfi formed a prolific partnership with the film director Oscar Apfel. From 1914 through 1924 he worked as Apfel's cinematographer on 15 feature-length silent films which were made for a variety of film studios including the Fox Film Corporation, Paramount Pictures, and the World Film Company among others. He also made several films with other directors for Selznick Pictures during the early 1920s. After this, his career in film was mainly over as his opera career in the United States became his focus. He worked as a cinematographer on two final films: The Viking (1931) and Amore e morte (1932).

Gandolfi was committed to the Chicago Civic Opera in 1923–1924. From 1924 to 1929 he was a leading baritone of the Philadelphia Civic Opera Company. In 1923 he made his debut at the San Francisco Opera, but was not a regular performer with the company until the 1930s. He notably portrayed Scarpia in Tosca with the company for the grand opening of the newly built War Memorial Opera House in San Francisco in 1932. He simultaneously worked as a singer at the Metropolitan Opera from 1929 through 1936, appearing in more than 300 performances on the Met stage. In New York he had supporting roles in the world premieres of Arrigo Pedrollo's La Veglie (1924), Deems Taylor's Peter Ibbetson (1931) and Howard Hanson's Merry Mount (1934). He wrote the libretto to Anthony F. Paganucci's one-act opera Idillio Pastorale (1932). After retiring from the stage he lived in New York City and worked as a voice teacher.

== Early career as both singer and cinematographer ==
Alfredo E. Gandolfi was born on 18 May 1885 in Turin, Italy. He worked as both a cinematographer and a singer. In c. 1906 he began his professional life as a cinematographer for the Cines film company in Rome, and then worked for Itala Film in his native city and for Pathé film until 1910. During this time he studied singing in his native city with mezzo-soprano Chiarina Fino-Savio. In 1911 he made his professional opera debut in Turin at the Teatro Vittorio Emanuele as Lord Enrico Ashton in Gaetano Donizetti's Lucia di Lammermoor. He later returned to that theater in 1913 as Lescaut in Giacomo Puccini's Manon Lescaut.

From 1910 to 1913 Gandolfi worked as a cameraman for Pathé Exchange in the United States. He then went to work for the Jesse L. Lasky Feature Play Company and the Morosco Photoplay Company, working as cameraman for the director Oscar Apfel on a number of pictures, including The Squaw Man (1914). In 1914 he portrayed Amfortas in the first staging in Italy of Richard Wagner's Parsifal at the Teatro Comunale di Bologna with Giuseppe Borgatti in the title role and Elena Rakowska as Kundry. He repeated the role of Amfortas in the same year at the Teatro Regio di Turino, the Teatro Carlo Felice, and La Scala. For Paramount Pictures he was the cinematographer for After Five (1915) which was co-directed by Apfel and Cecil B. DeMille.

In 1916 Gandolfi starred in a production of Emilio de' Cavalieri's Rappresentatione di Anima, et di Corpo at the Turin Conservatory, and was thereafter mainly inactive as a singer until appearing at the Cairo Opera House in 1923. He had previously joined the staff of the Fox Film Corporation in July 1915, with his first picture with the company being The Little Gypsy (1915) with Apfel once again as director. Other films Gandolfi made with Apfel for Fox included A Man of Sorrow (1916), The Battle of Hearts (1916), The Man from Bitter Roots (1916), and The End of the Trail (1916).

Gandolfi and Apfel next went to work for the World Film Company where together they made The Grouch (1918), The Rough Neck (1919), The Crook of Dreams (1919), The Little Intruder (1919), Bringing Up Betty (1919), The Oakdale Affair (1919), and Me and Captain Kidd (1919). After this Gandolfi worked mainly with other directors. With the director Colin Campbell, he made The Thunderbolt (1919) for First National Pictures. For Selznick Pictures he worked for varying directors as the cameraman for The Woman God Sent (1920), The Greatest Love (1920), A Divorce of Convenience (1921), and Conceit (1921). He teamed up with Apfel for one final picture, The Trail of the Law (1924).

After 1924 Gandolfi only served as cinematographer for two more pictures: the sound drama The Viking (1931) and Amore e morte (1932).

== Early singing career in the United States ==
Gandolfi continued to study singing in the United States with Cesare Sturani and Estelle Liebling. On January 29, 1922, Gandolfi gave his first public concert in the United States at DeWitt Clinton High School in New York City. In May and June 1922 he toured with the Scotti Grand Opera Company as Alfio in Cavalleria rusticana and Marcello in La bohème. In September 1922 he performed with the De Feo Grand Opera Company (DFGOC) at the Canadian National Exhibition, and later performed with that company in Baltimore as Scarpia in Tosca (1923) Sharpless in Madama Butterfly (1924) Scarpia in Tosca (1924), Escamillo in Carmen (1924), and Figaro in The Barber of Seville (1924). In 1926 he toured with the DFGOC to His Majesty's Theatre, Montreal, for performances of Jules Massenet's Werther and Camille Saint-Saëns's Samson and Delilah.

In November 1922 Gandolfi portrayed Germont in La traviata at the Broad Theatre in Newark, New Jersey. He made an unexpected debut at the Chicago Civic Opera (CCO) on November 17, 1923, replacing an ailing Giacomo Rimini as Lord Ashton in Lucia di Lammermoor with Florence Macbeth in the title role. He was heard with the company again the following December as the Fiddler in Königskinder with Claire Dux as The Goose Girl. Other roles he sang with the CCO included Alessio in La sonnambula (1924), Lord Ashton (1924), and Marchese d'Obigny in La traviata (1924, on tour to the Boston Opera House).

In April 1924 Gandolfi portrayed the title role in Verdi's Rigoletto for performances at the Crescent Temple in Trenton, New Jersey, and the Broad Theater in Newark. In May 1924 he appeared with the Philadelphia Orchestra on tour to the 25th Annual Spartanburg Music Festival in South Carolina where he performed the role of the Count di Luna in Verdi's Il trovatore with Frances Peralta as Leonora. In September 1924 he portrayed Scarpia at the Manhattan Opera House with Beatrice Melaragno as Tosca and Giuseppe Radelli as Cavaradossi. He performed the role of the Count di Luna at the 28th season of the Maine Music Festival in October 1924 with Joan Ruth as Inez and Marcella Roeseler as Leonora.

On December 20, 1924, Gandolfi created the role of Mike Dara in the world premiere of Arrigo Pedrollo's one-act opera La Veglie (English: The Wake) which was given at the Hotel Pennsylvania with Giuseppe Bamboschek as the music director.

== Philadelphia Civic Opera Company and other work from 1925 to 1929 ==
Gandolfi was a leading baritone with the Philadelphia Civic Opera Company (PCOC) from 1924 through 1929. He performed the role of Marcello for his debut with the PCOC at Philadelphia's Metropolitan Opera House on November 6, 1924. He later appeared with that company as Rafaele in I gioielli della Madonna (1925), Escamillo in Carmen (1925), Manfredo in The Love for Three Oranges (1925), Scarpia (1926), the Count di Luna (1927), Alfio (1927 and 1928), Pierre in Le Chemineau (1929), and the title role in The Marriage of Figaro (1929).

In 1926 he toured the United States and to Cuba with Andrés de Segurola's New York Civic Opera in such operas as Lucia di Lammermoor and Carmen. In May 1926 he portrayed Scarpia in Tosca at the Gran Teatro de La Habana in Cuba with Bianca Saroya in the title role as part of this tour. He later toured with this company again to Florida in 1927.

In September 1926 he starred in a concert version of La Juive given at the Coney Island Stadium as a benefit for the Jewish Sanatorium (now Zucker Hillside Hospital). In June 1927 he appeared at Broadway's Cort Theatre as Silvio in Pagliacci and Alfio in Cavalleria rusticana. In early 1928 he toured Canada with the Cosmopolitan Opera Company.

== Metropolitan Opera ==
Gandolfi worked at the Metropolitan Opera ("The Met") from 1929 through 1936 as primarily a comprimario and buffa baritone. He made his debut with the company on October 28, 1929, as the Sergeant in Puccini's Manon Lescaut. His other repertoire at the Met in his first season with the company included Donner in Das Rheingold, The Imperial Commissioner in Madama Butterfly, Ruiz in Il trovatore, and Zuàne in La Gioconda.

By 1936 Gandolfi had performed a total of 38 different roles at the Metropolitan Opera and appeared in more than 300 performances with the company. On February 7, 1931, he portrayed the manservant in the world premiere of Deems Taylor's Peter Ibbetson at the Met. On February 10, 1934, he created the role of Myles Brodrib in the world premiere of Howard Hanson's Merry Mount at the Met. He recorded this latter role for a complete recording of the opera released by Naxos Records in 1934. While his roles at the Met tended to be in small- to mid-sized supporting roles, on occasion he would portray bigger parts such as Scarpia in Tosca. Other roles in his repertoire at the Met included Alfio in Cavalleria rusticana, Baron Douphol in La Traviata, Cappadocian in Salome, Filiberto in Il signor Bruschino, Fléville in Andrea Chénier, Fra Melitone in La forza del destino, Monterone in Rigoletto, Paolo Albiani in Simon Boccanegra, Ruggiero in La Juive, Sacristan in Tosca, Ser Amantio di Nicolao in Gianni Schicchi, and Springer (the ringmaster) in The Bartered Bride. His final performance at the Met was as Amantio in Gianni Schicchi on March 20, 1936.

== San Francisco Opera ==
Gandolfi was a leading baritone at the San Francisco Opera (SFO) in the 1930s. While he made his debut at the (SFO) in 1923 as Marcello in La bohème with Queena Mario as Mimì he was not seen on the SFO stage again until nine years later. He notably sang Scarpia in Tosca at the inaugural opening of the War Memorial Opera House in San Francisco in 1932, a performance which was recorded and whose other stars included Claudia Muzio as Tosca and Dino Borgioli as Mario Cavaradossi. He later reprised the role of Scarpia at the SFO in 1934 with Lilli Lehmann as Tosca.

Other roles Gandolfi performed at the SFO included Alfio (1932), Count Gil in Il segreto di Susanna (1933), Lescaut in Jules Massenet's Manon (1933 and 1934), Melot in Tristan und Isolde (1933), Silvio in Pagliacci (1933), Sharpless (1934), Donner in Das Rheingold (1935), Schaunard in La bohème (1935), and Fra Melitone in La forza del destino (1936).

== Other work ==
In 1930 Gandolfi appeared as a soloist with the Baltimore Symphony Orchestra, singing Anthony F. Paganucci's The Gypsy King. He later collaborated with Paganucci on the opera Idillio Pastorale (published 1932 by Carl Fischer Inc.), serving as the composer's librettist for that work, and served as lyricist for Paganucci's Columbina, a work described as a "dramatic episode".

In 1931 Gandolfi performed the roles of Friedrich of Telramund in Wagner's Lohengrin, Capulet in Charles Gounod's Roméo et Juliette and Colonel Ibbetson in Peter Ibbetson at the Ravinia Festival with the Chicago Symphony Orchestra. In April 1932 he gave a recital in Baltimore with the soprano Elsa Baklor at the Maryland Casualty Auditorium (now the site of The Rotunda). In July 1933 he sang the role of Germont in La traviata with the Philadelphia Orchestra at the Robin Hood Dell with conductor Alexander Smallens. He appeared in operas again with the Philadelphia Orchestra as the High Priest of Dagon in Samson and Delilah (1934) and Scarpia in Tosca.

In August 1933 he performed arias from Carmen with his future wife, the soprano Alice Kurkjian, and the New York Philharmonic (NYP) at Lewisohn Stadium, which were broadcast on American radio. He performed in several more concerts with the NYP at the Lewisohn Stadium in the summers of 1934 and 1935. In May 1934 he performed with the NYP at the Westchester County Music Festival in which he was a featured soloist in excerpts from Die Meistersinger von Nürnberg.

In May 1934 Gandolfi portrayed Sharpless in Madama Butterfly at Radio City Music Hall with Anne Roselle as Cio-Cio-San. In September, October, and November 1934 he performed with the St. Louis Grand Opera Company in multiple roles, including Escamillo in Carmen, Marcello, Scarpia, Sharpless, and Telramund in Lohengrin. In February 1935 he performed the role of Count Gil in Il segreto di Susanna with the Detroit Symphony Orchestra. In May 1935 he performed at the Detroit Opera House with the Detroit Civic Opera as Colonel Ibbetson in Peter Ibbetson with the composer conducting. In August 1935 he performed in the premiere of Raymond Knight's three-act play Mr. Smith at the Buck Hill Falls Inn.

In April 1936 Gandolfi performed the role of the evil magician Klingsor in Parsifal with the Cleveland Orchestra and conductor Artur Rodziński. The following November he performed the role of Amonasro in Aida at the Shrine Auditorium in Los Angeles. In December 1936 he portrayed Scarpia to Lotte Lehmann's Tosca with the Cincinnati Symphony Orchestra. In 1937 he performed with conductor Otto Klemperer and the Los Angeles Philharmonic at the Hollywood Bowl in the roles of Zuniga in Carmen with Bruna Castagna in the title role, and Sharpless in Madama Butterfly with Hizi Koyke as Cio-Cio-San.

== Marriage, teaching, and later life ==
In 1932 Gandolfi was appointed to the faculty of the newly established New York School of Vocal Art. He married soprano Alice Kurkjian at St. Clare Church in Manhattan on February 3, 1934. After retiring from the stage, the couple lived at The Ansonia in New York City where Gandolfi also had a private studio as a voice teacher.

Gandolfi died of anemia at the age of 78 on 9 June 1963 at St. Luke's Hospital (now Mount Sinai Morningside) in New York City.
