= Minnie Egener =

American opera singer (1881–1938)

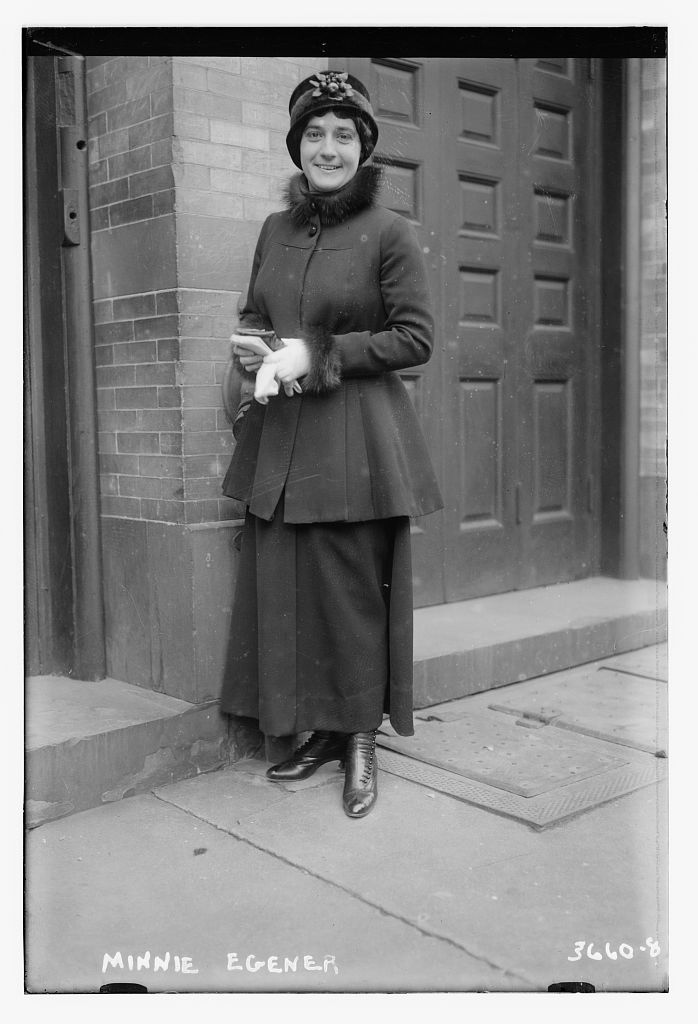
Minnie Egener at the Metropolitan Opera in 1915

Minnie Egener (1881–1938) was an American operatic mezzo-soprano.

== Biography ==
She made her professional opera debut in 1904 at the Metropolitan Opera as one of the flower maidens in Richard Wagner's Parsifal. In 1906 she moved to Italy and spent the next several years performing in operas with various theaters throughout that nation. In 1910 she performed the role of Alissa in Donizetti's Lucia di Lammermoor with Luisa Tetrazzini at the Teatro Regio di Parma; she also appeared in small roles at Covent Garden and at the Manhattan Center. Over the next four years she performed in several operas with the Philadelphia Grand Opera Company and the Chicago Grand Opera Company. In 1914 she returned to the Metropolitan Opera, where she performed mostly comprimario roles for the next eighteen years. Most notably, Egener performed in the original productions of Frederick Delius's A Village Romeo and Juliet in 1907, Reginald De Koven's The Canterbury Pilgrims in 1917, Puccini's Suor Angelica in 1918, Albert Wolff's opera L'oiseau bleu in 1919, Deems Taylor's The King's Henchman in 1927, and Taylor's Peter Ibbetson in 1931. Her final performance was on 15 December 1932 as Flora in Verdi's La traviata which marked her 752nd performance at the Metropolitan Opera. Thereafter she taught voice first in New York City and later in New Orleans. She was married to the conductor Louis Hasselmans (1878–1957). She died in New York in 1933.

== Recordings ==
Egener made a few recordings for the Victor Talking Machine Company including the famous 1917 recording of the Sextet from Lucia di Lammermoor with Enrico Caruso and Amelita Galli-Curci.
