= Louis D'Angelo =

American opera singer

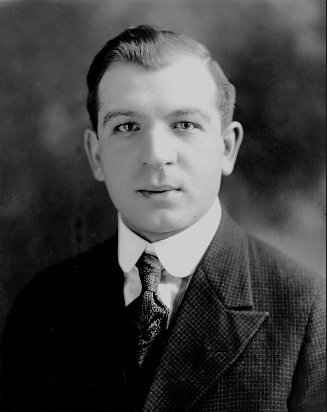
- The opera singer in 1917
- Born: May 6, 1888; Naples, Italy
- Died: August 9, 1958 (aged 70); Jersey City, New Jersey
- Occupation: Operatic bass-baritone
- Organizations: Metropolitan Opera

Louis D'Angelo (May 6, 1888 – August 9, 1958) was an American bass-baritone of Italian birth who was particularly known for his performances at the Metropolitan Opera during the first half of the 20th century. He created roles in the world premieres of seven operas at the Met, including Marco in Puccini's Gianni Schicchi in 1917.

D'Angelo also sang roles in the United States premieres of thirteen works. In total, he appeared in 1,882 performances at the Met.

He sang a broad repertoire of more than 300 roles at the Met ranging from leading roles to comprimario parts. His voice was recorded for several Metropolitan Opera radio broadcasts, and on several complete opera recordings made by the Met for Naxos Records.

== Early life and career ==
D'Angelo was born on May 6, 1888, in Naples, Italy. With his family he moved to the United States at the age of three. He was trained in the United States and began his career as a leading baritone with the Century Opera Company in 1914. He made his debut with that company as Macroton in L'amore medico. Other roles he sang at the Century Opera House included Silvio in Pagliacci, Baron Douphol in La traviata, Kagama in Natoma, and Yamadori in Madama Butterfly.

== Work with the Metropolitan Opera ==
From 1917–1948 D'Angelo was a performer with the Metropolitan Opera in New York City where he appeared in a total of 1,882 performances. He made his debut with the Met at the Brooklyn Academy of Music as Sciarrone in Tosca with Geraldine Farrar in the title role on November 13, 1917. His first performance at the "Old Met" was on November 17, 1917, as Wagner in Faust with Giovanni Martinelli as the eponymous hero.

=== World premiere roles ===
D'Angelo created roles in several world premieres at the Met, including:

- Marco in Puccini's Gianni Schicchi (1917)
- Count Stackareff in The Legend (1919)
- The Roman Officer in Cleopatra's Night (1920)
- Ordgar in The King's Henchman (1927)
- The Chaplain in Peter Ibbetson (1931)
- Praise God Tewke in Merry Mount (1934)
- Both Commodore Stephen Decatur and Sergeant O'Neil in The Man Without a Country (1937)

=== Singing roles in U.S. premieres ===
At the Met he also sang roles in the United States premieres of thirteen works, including:

- The Captain in Eugene Onegin (1920)
- Niclas in Karel Weis' Der Polnische Jude (1921)
- Bermiyta in The Snow Maiden (1922)
- Masolino in Mona Lisa (1923)
- Uncle in Primo Riccitelli's I Compagnacci (1924)
- Tornaquinci in La cena delle beffe (1926)
- Tío Salvaor in La vida breve (1926)
- The Count in Franco Alfano's Madonna Imperia (1928)
- The Schoolmaster in La campana sommersa (1928)
- Squint-Eye in Fra Gherardo (1929)
- Duda in Sadko (1930)
- Lyoval in La notte di Zoraima (1931)
- Both Tommati and the Innkeeper in Caponsacchi (1937)

=== First stagings at the Met ===
D'Angelo also performed roles in the Met's first stagings of several operas, including:

- Marquis de Calatrava in La forza del destino (1918)
- Harun al Raschid in Oberon (1918)
- Courtois Zazà (1920)
- The Grand Inquisitor in Don Carlos (1920)
- The Junkman in Louise (1921)
- Dumas in Andrea Chénier (1921)
- A Blind Man in La Habanera (1924)
- A Bandit in Don Quichotte (1926)
- Sir Douglas in Donna Juanita (1932)
- Uberto in La serva padrona (1935)
- Geronimo in Il matrimonio segreto (1937)

=== Other roles ===
Other roles he performed for the company included:

- Abimélech in Samson et Dalila
- Alcindoro, Benoit, and Schaunard in La bohème
- Bartolo in The Barber of Seville
- Bonze in Madama Butterfly
- Crespel and Spalanzani in The Tales of Hoffmann
- The Duke of Verona in Roméo et Juliette
- The Innkeeper in Manon
- Kecal in The Bartered Bride
- The King of Egypt in Aida
- The Monk in La Gioconda
- Nachtigall in Die Meistersinger von Nürnberg
- Reinmar in Tannhäuser
- Roustan in Madame Sans-Gêne
- The Second Knight in Parsifal
- The Steersman in Tristan und Isolde
- The Sultan in Mârouf, savetier du Caire
- Zuniga in Carmen (among many others)

=== Final appearance ===
His last appearance at the Metropolitan Opera was on February 15, 1948, as Grenvil in La traviata.

== Death and legacy ==
D'Angelo died on August 9, 1958, at Jersey City, New Jersey, aged 70. He sang an extensive repertoire of more than 300 roles in a total of 1,882 performances at the Metropolitan Opera. Louis D’Angelo is credited in the 2013 film The Immigrant as a driver for the transportation department.

== Recordings ==
- Georges Bizet, Carmen, Metropolitan Opera Orchestra and Chorus, conducted by Wilfrid Pelletier, Gladys Swarthout, Charles Kullman, Licia Albanese (1941, Naxos)
- Gustave Charpentier, Louise, Metropolitan Opera Orchestra and Chorus, conducted by Thomas Beecham, Grace Moore, Raoul Jobin, Ezio Pinza (1943, Naxos)
- Charles Gounod, Roméo et Juliette, Metropolitan Opera Orchestra and Chorus, conducted by Louis Hasselmans, Charles Hackett, Eidé Norena, Angelo Bada (1935, Naxos)
- Howard Hanson, Merry Mount, Metropolitan Opera Orchestra and Chorus, conducted by Tullio Serafin, Lawrence Tibbett, Göta Ljungberg, Gladys Swarthout (1934, Naxos)
- Wolfgang Amadeus Mozart, Don Giovanni, Metropolitan Opera Orchestra and Chorus, conducted by Tullio Serafin, Ezio Pinza, Virgilio Lazzari, Rosa Ponselle (1934, Andromeda)
- Wolfgang Amadeus Mozart, The Marriage of Figaro, Metropolitan Opera Orchestra and Chorus, conducted by Paul Breisach, Ezio Pinza, Bidu Sayão, John Brownlee (Guild Historical,1943)
- Bedřich Smetana, The Bartered Bride, Metropolitan Opera Orchestra and Chorus, conducted by Wilfrid Pelletier, Hilda Burke, Mario Chamlee, George Rasely (1937, Bensar Records)
- Giuseppe Verdi, La traviata, Metropolitan Opera Orchestra and Chorus, conducted by Ettore Panizza, Jarmila Novotná, Jan Peerce, Lawrence Tibbett (Myto, 1941)
- Giuseppe Verdi, Simon Boccanegra, Metropolitan Opera Orchestra and Chorus, conducted by Ettore Panizza, Lawrence Tibbett, Elisabeth Rethberg, Giovanni Martinelli (1939, MET)
