= Angelo Badà =

Italian operatic tenor (1876–1941)

Angelo Badà (Pernate, 27 May 1876 – Novara, 23 March 1941) was an Italian operatic tenor. He was on the roster of the Metropolitan Opera for 30 years where he gave a total of 2,170 performance in 94 different operas in over 100 different roles from 1908 through 1938. Only two singers in the Met's history have made more appearances with the company: Charles Anthony and George Cehanovsky. He mostly appeared in comprimario roles during his career, although he did occasionally perform larger parts. His repertoire encompassed operas in the English, Italian, French, and German languages.

== Life and career ==
Born in Pernate (Novara), Badà studied singing in his native city with Cecilio Manfredi. He made his professional opera debut in January 1900 as the messenger in Giuseppe Verdi's Aida. He spent the next eight years performing mainly comprimario roles in major opera houses in Italy, including La Scala in Milan and the Teatro di San Carlo in Naples. He also made appearances at the Royal Opera House in London.

Badà made his debut with the Metropolitan Opera on 16 November 1908. He appeared with the Met for 30 seasons, giving his last performance on 9 April 1938. During those years he also appeared as a guest artist in operas, recitals, and concerts in Europe, South America, Australia, and Africa. At the Met he sang in the world premieres of several operas, including Giacomo Puccini's, La fanciulla del West (1910), Umberto Giordano's Madame Sans-Gêne (1915), Charles Wakefield Cadman's Shanewis (1918), Puccini's Il tabarro (1918), Puccini's Gianni Schicchi (1918), Albert Wolff's, L'oiseau bleu (1919), and Deems Taylor's Peter Ibbetson (1931).

After retiring from the Met, Badà returned to Novara, where he built a large home and lived quietly. He died after a brief illness three years later in his native city. He is buried in the Novara Cemetery.

== Sources ==
- Biography of Angelo Badà at www.oknovara.it
- Metropolitan Opera Archives
- Gianfranco Capra – Angelo Badaà, 30 anni al "Metropolitan" – quaderni novaresi – ediz.ZEN Iniziatove (marzo 2007)
