= Marion Telva =

American opera singer

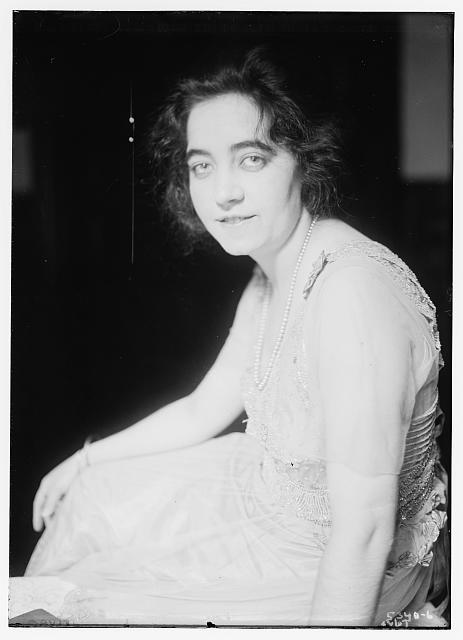
- Born: Marion Taucke; December 26, 1897; St. Louis, Missouri, US
- Died: October 23, 1962 (aged 64); Norwalk, Connecticut, US
- Other name: Marion Telva Jones
- Occupation: singer (mezzo-soprano)
- Employer: Metropolitan Opera
- Known for: role of Adalgisa in Norma
- Spouse: Elmer Ray Jones

Marion Telva (December 26, 1897 – October 23, 1962) was an American opera singer who was a leading mezzo-soprano at New York's Metropolitan Opera for a decade.

== Biography ==
Telva was born in St. Louis, Missouri, on December 26, 1897. Her parents were German immigrants, Herman and Elsa Taucke; she would later take Telva as her stage name. She studied under Lilli Lehmann.

Early in her career, Telva sang with the St. Louis Symphony Orchestra. She moved to New York in 1918 and sang in local churches and synagogues before being hired by the Metropolitan Opera. She debuted with the company in 1920 as the Singer in Puccini's Manon Lescaut. She went on to sing many other roles as one of the company's leading mezzo-sopranos until 1931. Among her regular roles were Brangane in Wagner's Tristan und Isolde and Mary in his The Flying Dutchman, and Lola in Mascagni's Cavalleria Rusticana. She also appeared a few times as Princess Eboli in Verdi's Don Carlos (1920–21) and Azucena in his Il trovatore (1923–24).

Telva is probably best known for her role as Adalgisa in the company's 1927–28 revival of Vincenzo Bellini's Norma. Telva spent part of the summer before the opening of Norma studying the opera with soprano Rosa Ponselle, who would sing the title role, and Tullio Serafin, then one of the company's conductors. Another well-known role is her appearance as Mrs. Deane in the premiere of Deems Taylor’s Peter Ibbetson in 1931.

In 1930, she married Elmer Ray Jones, president of Wells Fargo, who died in 1961. Jones built a hotel in Taxco, Mexico, and named it Rancho Telva in her honor.

Although Telva effectively retired at the end of the 1930–31 season, she made one further appearance at the Metropolitan Opera during the 1932-33 season, in a special concert. In the 1930s, she undertook a few more special engagements, such as singing Beethoven's Missa Solemnis with the New York Philharmonic (1935).

On October 23, 1962, she died in Norwalk, Connecticut. She had lived for three decades in the nearby community of Silvermine.
