= Giulio Crimi =

Italian opera singer

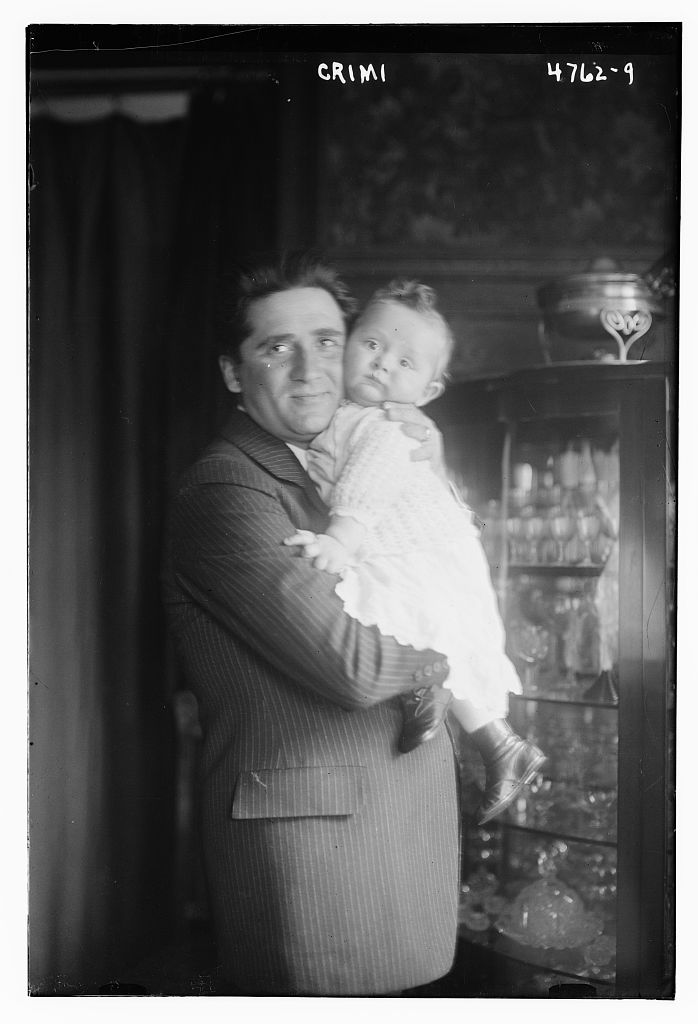
Giulio Crimi in 1918

Giulio Crimi (May 10, 1885 – October 29, 1939) was an Italian operatic tenor.

== Biography ==
Crimi was born in Paternò, Italy. He studied in Catania with Adernò and made his debut in Palermo, as Manrico in Il trovatore, in 1910, later appearing in Treviso as Hagenbach in La Wally. He sang throughout Italy, Rome, Milan, etc., and created in Turin the role of Paolo in Zandonai's Francesca da Rimini in 1914. That same year saw his debut in London, where he sang the role of Avito in the local premiere of L'amore dei tre re, at the Royal Opera House.

In 1916, he made his debut at the Teatro Colón in Buenos Aires, and at the Lyric Opera of Chicago. His Metropolitan Opera debut took place in November 1918, as Radames in Aida, the following month (on December 14) he created the roles of Luigi and Rinuccio in the Puccini operas Il tabarro and Gianni Schicchi. He remained at the Met until 1922, singing Rodolfo, Alfredo, Turiddu, Canio, Chénier, Milio.

Other notable roles included des Grieux, Alvaro, Walther, Vasco, etc. He retired from the stage in 1927, and taught in Rome, where he died in 1939. Amongst his pupils were Gino Del Signore and Tito Gobbi.
