= Marie Tiffany =

American opera singer (1881–1948)

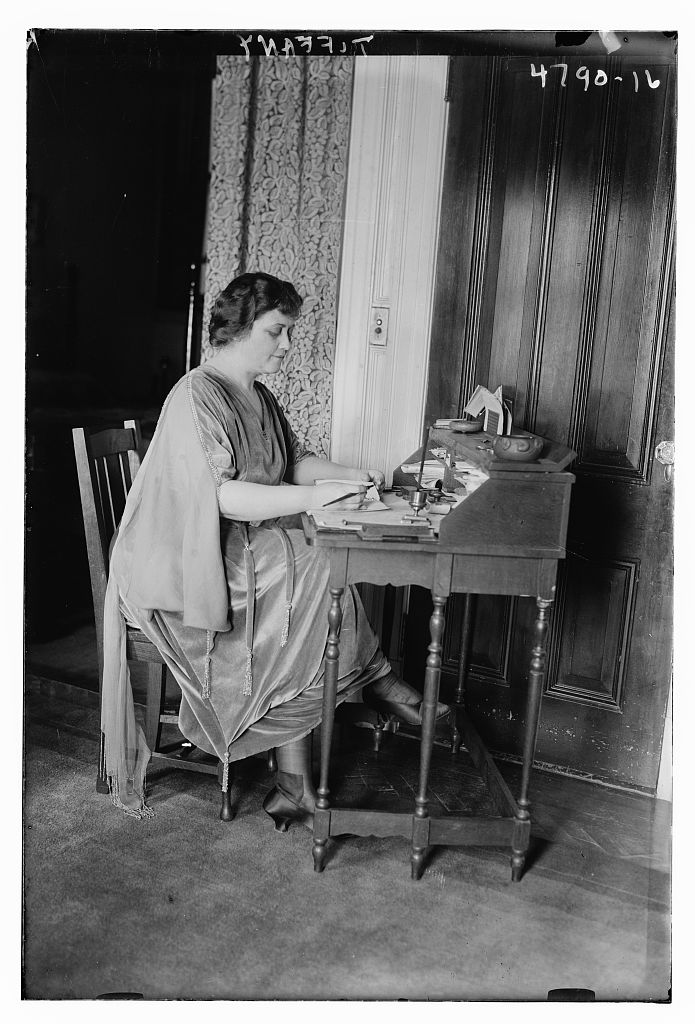
Marie Tiffany in 1919

Marie Berg Tiffany (July 8, 1881 - April 12, 1948) was an American operatic lyric soprano. She was a member of the Metropolitan Opera in Manhattan, New York City, from 1916 to 1928; making 208 appearances at the Met throughout her career. She created roles in several world premieres at the Met and was the only performer to appear in all three one act operas at the premiere of Giacomo Puccini's Il Trittico in 1918.

== Biography ==
She was born Marie Berg on July 8, 1881, in Chicago, Illinois.

Tiffany married court reporter Willis N. Tiffany in 1900 and resided with him for 16 years in California where she was a soloist at the First Presbyterian Church of Pasadena. In 1916 she moved to New York City, where she soon became a member of the Metropolitan Opera. She made her Met debut on November 17, 1916, as the Milliner in Richard Strauss' Der Rosenkavalier under conductor Artur Bodanzky. She remained at the Met for the next 12 years, singing mainly comprimario roles. She performed in several world premieres at the Met, including Reginald De Koven's The Canterbury Pilgrims (1917), Charles Wakefield Cadman's Shanewis (1918), Giacomo Puccini's Il Trittico (1918), Albert Wolff's L'oiseau bleu (1919), and Henry Kimball Hadley's Cleopatra's Night (1920). She also portrayed the role of Pomone in the United States premiere of Xavier Leroux's La reine Fiammette. Some of her other Met roles were Clémence in Mireille, Frasquita in Carmen, Gerhilde in Die Walküre, Giannetta in L'elisir d'amore, the High Priestess in Aida, Kate Pinkerton in Madama Butterfly, Mme. Dufresne in Zazà, Poussette in Manon, the Sandman in Hänsel und Gretel, Suzanne in Louise, and the Young Woman in L'amore dei tre re. Her last appearance in an opera at the Met was on April 7, 1928, as Nella in Gianni Schicchi. She returned to the Met stage for one concert appearance in 1929.

She died on April 12, 1948, in Manhattan, New York City.
