= Gianni Schicchi =

1918 comic opera by Giacomo Puccini

- Opera by Giacomo Puccini
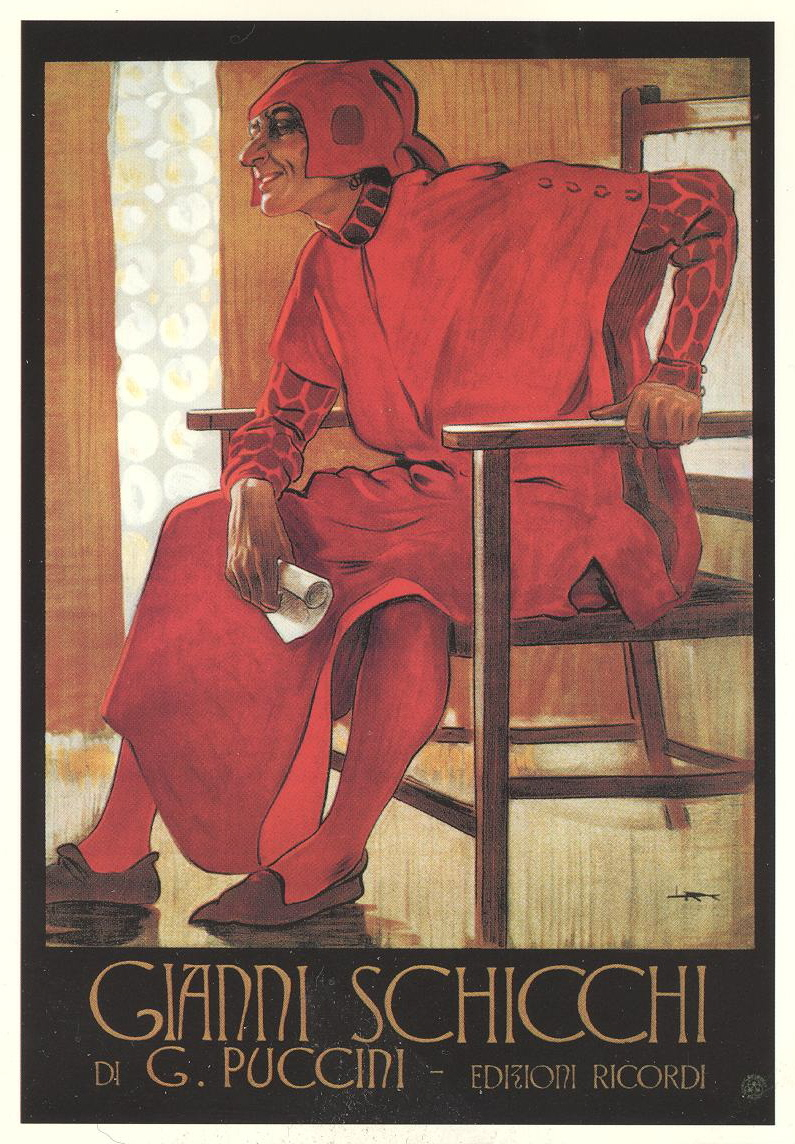
- 1918–1919 poster
- Description: One-act opera, part of Il trittico
- Librettist: Giovacchino Forzano
- Language: Italian
- Based on: Dante's Divine Comedy
- Premiere: 14 December 1918; Metropolitan Opera

Gianni Schicchi (Italian pronunciation: [ˈdʒanni ˈskikki]) is a comic opera in one act by Giacomo Puccini to an Italian libretto by Giovacchino Forzano, composed in 1917–18. The libretto is based on an incident mentioned in Dante's Divine Comedy. The work is the third and final part of Puccini's Il trittico (The Triptych) – three one-act operas with contrasting themes, originally written to be presented together. Although it continues to be performed with one or both of the other trittico operas, Gianni Schicchi is now more frequently staged either alone or with short operas by other composers. The aria "O mio babbino caro" is one of Puccini's best known, and one of the most popular arias in opera.

Puccini had long considered writing a set of one-act operas which would be performed together in a single evening, but faced with a lack of suitable subjects and opposition from his publisher, he repeatedly put the project aside. However, by 1916 Puccini had completed the one-act tragedy Il tabarro and, after considering various ideas, he began work the following year on the solemn, religious, all-female opera Suor Angelica. Gianni Schicchi, a comedy, completes the triptych with a further contrast of mood. The score combines elements of Puccini's modern style of harmonic dissonance with lyrical passages reminiscent of Rossini, and it has been praised for its inventiveness and imagination.

When Il trittico premiered at New York's Metropolitan Opera in December 1918, Gianni Schicchi became an immediate hit, while the other two operas were received with less enthusiasm. This pattern was broadly repeated at the Rome and London premieres and led to commercial pressures to abandon the less successful elements. Although on artistic grounds Puccini opposed performing the three operas except as the original triptych, by 1920 he had given his reluctant consent to separate performances. Gianni Schicchi has subsequently become the most-performed part of Il trittico and has been widely recorded.

== Historical background ==
Gianni Schicchi de' Cavalcanti was a 13th-century Italian knight, a Florentine historical figure mentioned by Dante in the Inferno, Canto XXX. In that canto, Dante visits the Circle of Impersonators and sees a man savagely attacking another: he is told that the attacker is Schicchi, condemned to Hell for impersonating Buoso Donati and making Donati's will highly favorable to Schicchi.

The plot used in the opera derives from an 1866 edition of The Divine Comedy by philologist Pietro Fanfani, which contained an appendix with a commentary attributed to an anonymous Florentine of the 14th century. In this version, Buoso wishes to make a will, but is put off doing so by his son, Simone. Once it is too late, Simone fears that Buoso, before his illness, may have made a will unfavourable to him. Simone calls on Schicchi for advice, and Schicchi has the idea of impersonating Buoso and making a new will. Simone promises Schicchi he will be well rewarded, but Schicchi takes no chances, "leaving" a considerable sum and Buoso's mule to himself (though most goes to Simone), and makes the bequests conditional on Simone's distributing the estate within fifteen days, otherwise everything will go to charity.

Both Schicchi and Buoso Donati were historical characters. Dante's verses, and the opera, are based on an actual incident that took place in 13th century Florence. Dante had several reasons for his harsh treatment of Schicchi: Dante's wife, Gemma, was of the Donati family; the poet himself was of pure Florentine descent. He despised members of the peasant class such as Schicchi. Dante's class prejudice displays itself in several episodes in the Inferno: in one, three noble Florentines, who have died and gone to Hell, ask Dante for news of their home city. A disgusted Dante tells them that the city is now dominated by the nouveau riche.

According to Burton Fisher, Puccini and Forzano borrowed heavily from the commedia dell'arte tradition in Gianni Schicchi. Schicchi himself recalls the roguish Harlequin, while his daughter Lauretta, whose romance is nearly foiled by Buoso's relatives, resembles Columbina. Simone is drawn from Pantaloon, while the poverty-stricken Betto recalls the buffoonish valet Zanni. Doctor Spinelloccio recalls the classic doctor from the commedia dell'arte, Balanzone, even to his Bolognese origin. The Moor whose death momentarily scares the relatives, and his captain, are stock characters from commedia dell'arte.

== Roles ==
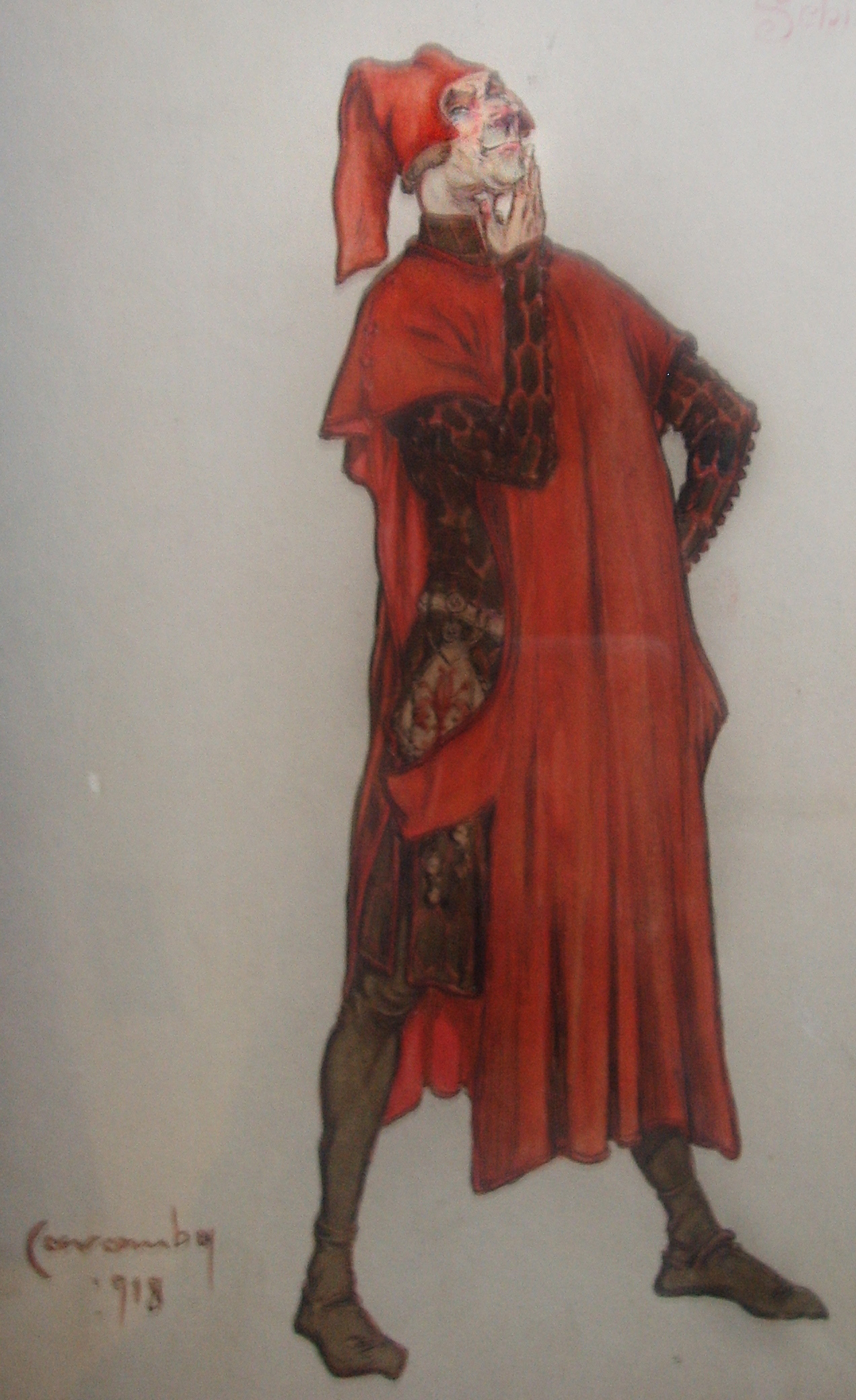
Sketch for Gianni Schicchi costume (1918)

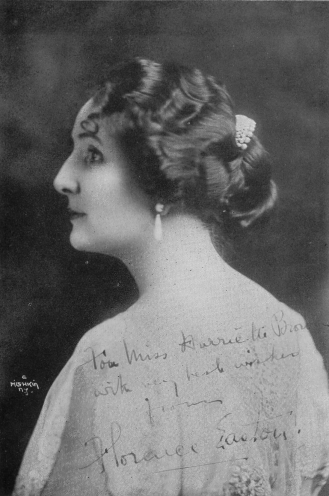
Florence Easton, who sang Lauretta at the 1918 world premiere

Roles, voice types, premiere cast
Role	Voice type	Premiere cast, 14 December 1918 Conductor: Roberto Moranzoni
Gianni Schicchi (age 50)	baritone	Giuseppe De Luca
Lauretta, his daughter (age 21)	soprano	Florence Easton
Zita, cousin of Buoso Donati (age 60)	contralto	Kathleen Howard
Rinuccio, Zita's nephew (age 24)	tenor	Giulio Crimi
Gherardo, Buoso's nephew (age 40)	tenor	Angelo Badà
Nella, Gherardo's wife (age 34)	soprano	Marie Tiffany
Gherardino, their son (age 7)	soprano or treble	Mario Malatesta
Betto di Signa, Buoso's brother-in-law, poor and shabbily dressed, of uncertain age	bass	Paolo Ananian
Simone, cousin of Buoso (age 70)	bass	Adamo Didur
Marco, Simone's son (age 45)	baritone	Louis D'Angelo
La Ciesca, Marco's wife (age 38)	mezzo-soprano	Marie Sundelius
Maestro Spinelloccio, a doctor	bass	Pompilio Malatesta
Ser Amantio di Nicolao, a notary	baritone	Andrés de Segurola
Pinellino, a cobbler	bass	Vincenzo Reschiglian
Guccio, a dyer	bass	Carl Schlegel

== Synopsis ==
The story takes place in Florence, 1299. As Buoso Donati lies dead in his curtained four-poster bed, his relatives gather round to mourn his passing, but are really more interested in learning the contents of his will. Among those present are his cousins Zita and Simone, his poor-relation brother-in-law Betto, and Zita's nephew Rinuccio. Betto mentions a rumour he has heard that Buoso has left everything to a monastery; this disturbs the others and precipitates a frantic search for the will. The document is found by Rinuccio, who is confident that his uncle has left him plenty of money. He withholds the will momentarily and asks Zita to allow him to marry Lauretta, daughter of Gianni Schicchi, a newcomer to Florence. Zita replies that if Buoso has left them rich, he can marry whom he pleases; she and the other relatives are anxious to begin reading the will. A happy Rinuccio sends little Gherardino to fetch Schicchi and Lauretta.

As they read, the relatives' worst fears are soon realised; Buoso has indeed bequeathed his fortune to the monastery. They break out in woe and indignation and turn to Simone, the oldest present and a former mayor of Fucecchio, but he can offer no help. Rinuccio suggests that only Gianni Schicchi can advise them what to do, but this is scorned by Zita and the rest, who sneer at Schicchi's humble origins and now say that marriage to the daughter of such a peasant is out of the question. Rinuccio defends Schicchi in an aria "Avete torto" ("You're mistaken"), after which Schicchi and Lauretta arrive. Schicchi quickly grasps the situation, and Rinuccio begs him for help, but Schicchi is rudely told by Zita to "be off" and take his daughter with him. Rinuccio and Lauretta listen in despair as Schicchi announces that he will have nothing to do with such people. Lauretta makes a final plea to him with "O mio babbino caro" ("Oh, my dear papa"), and he agrees to look at the will. After twice scrutinizing it and concluding that nothing can be done, an idea occurs to him. He sends his daughter outside so that she will be innocent of what is to follow.

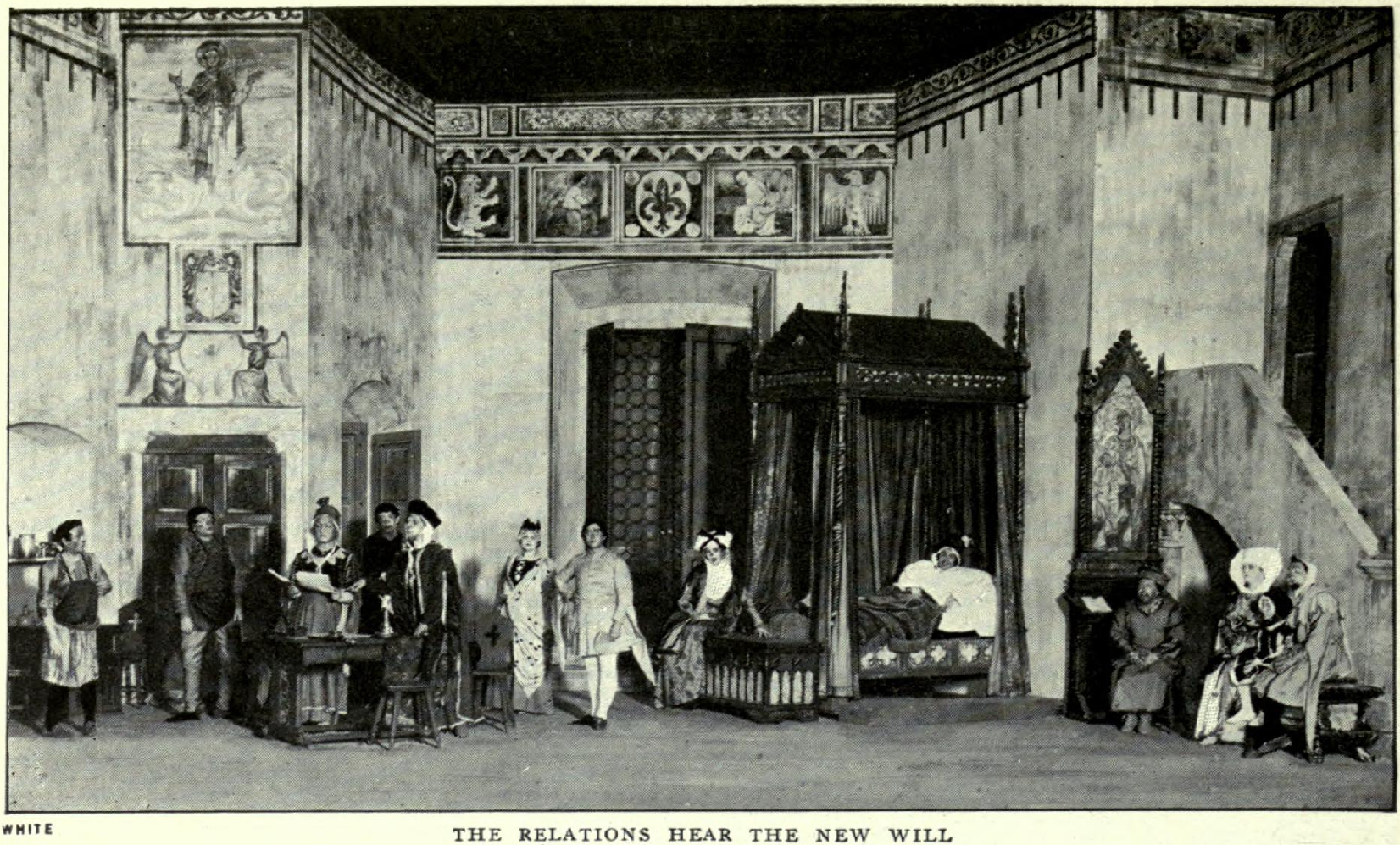
The relatives listen to the reading of the will. From the original Metropolitan Opera production.

First, Schicchi establishes that no one other than those present knows that Buoso is dead. He then orders the body removed to another room. A knock announces the arrival of the doctor, Spinelloccio. Schicchi conceals himself behind the bed curtains, mimics Buoso's voice, and declares that he is feeling better; he asks the doctor to return that evening. Boasting that he has never lost a patient, Spinelloccio departs. Schicchi then unveils his plan in the aria "Si corre dal notaio" ("Run to the notary"); having established in the doctor's mind that Buoso is still alive, Schicchi will disguise himself as Buoso and dictate a new will. All are delighted with the scheme, and importune Schicchi with personal requests for Buoso's various possessions, the most treasured of which are "the mule, the house and the mills at Signa". A funeral bell rings, and everyone fears that the news of Buoso's death has emerged, but it turns out that the bell is tolling for the death of a neighbour's Moorish servant. The relatives agree to leave the disposition of the mule, the house and the mills to Schicchi, though each, in turn, offers him a bribe. The women help him to change into Buoso's clothes as they sing the lyrical trio "Spogliati, bambolino" ("Undress, little boy"). Before taking his place in the bed, Schicchi warns the company of the grave punishment for those found to have falsified a will: amputation of one hand, and then, exile from Florence.

The notary arrives, and Schicchi starts to dictate the new will, declaring any prior will null and void. To general satisfaction, he allocates the minor bequests, but when it comes to the mule, the house and the mills, he orders that these be left to "my devoted friend Gianni Schicchi". Incredulous, the family can do nothing while the lawyer is present, especially when Schicchi slyly reminds them of the penalties that discovery of the ruse will bring. Their outrage when the notary leaves is accompanied by a frenzy of looting as Schicchi chases them out of what is now his house.

Meanwhile, Lauretta and Rinuccio sing a love duet, "Lauretta mia", as there is no bar to their marriage since Schicchi can now provide a respectable dowry. Schicchi, returning, stands moved at the sight of the two lovers. He turns to the audience and asks them to agree that no better use could be found for Buoso's wealth: although the poet Dante has condemned him to hell for this trick, Schicchi asks the audience to forgive him in light of "extenuating circumstances."

== Composition history ==
The one-act opera genre had become increasingly popular in Italy following the 1890 competition sponsored by publisher Edoardo Sonzogno for the best such work, which was won by the young Pietro Mascagni's Cavalleria rusticana. With Tosca essentially completed by November 1899, Puccini sought a new project. Among sources he considered, before proceeding with Madama Butterfly, were three works by French dramatist Alphonse Daudet that Puccini thought might be made into a trilogy of one-act operas.

After Butterfly premiered in 1904, Puccini again had difficulty finding a new subject. He further considered the idea of composing three one-act operas to be performed together but found his publisher, Giulio Ricordi, firmly opposed to such a project, convinced that it would be expensive to cast and produce. The composer then planned to work with his longtime librettist, Giuseppe Giacosa, on an opera about Marie Antoinette, a project frustrated by the librettist's illness. Puccini wrote in November 1905, "Will we go back to it? [Maria Antonietta] If I find three one-act works that suit me, I'll put off M.A." Puccini pursued neither project, as Giacosa's illness led to his death in September 1906.

In March 1907, Puccini wrote to Carlo Clausetti, Ricordi's representative in Naples, proposing three one-act operas based on scenes from stories by Russian novelist Maxim Gorky. By May the composer had set aside this proposal to concentrate on the project which became La fanciulla del West, although he did not wholly abandon the idea of a multiple-opera evening. His next idea in this vein, some years later, was for a two-opera bill, one tragic and one comic; he later expanded this to include a third opera with a mystic or religious tone. By November 1916 Puccini had completed the "tragic" element, which became Il tabarro, but he still lacked ideas for the other two works. He considered staging Il tabarro in combination with his own early work Le Villi, or with other two-act operas which might be used to round out the evening's entertainment. Finally, librettist Giovacchino Forzano presented the composer with two works of his own, which became Suor Angelica and Gianni Schicchi. The latter would be Puccini's first setting of a comic text; although his earlier operas, for example La bohème, contain comic episodes, these are merely ancillary to the drama to provide contrast.

Forzano wrote to Tito Ricordi, Giulio's son, on 3 March 1917:

I sent the libretto of Suor Angelica to Maestro Puccini some days ago. He has declared himself – kind as he is – very satisfied ... I have also finished a brief outline of a plot based on Gianni Schicchi. You know the Maestro's opinion of this subject, which is rich in possibilities and whose comic nature is quite out of the ordinary.

In fact, Puccini was at first less than enthusiastic about the idea for this comic opera – Florence as a setting did not appeal to him, and he feared the public would have little interest in the subject. However, he soon became interested and did some work on the piece even while composing Suor Angelica. The religious-themed opera was completed in September 1917, and Puccini turned his full attention to Gianni Schicchi, although the war news and the 1918 influenza pandemic, in which Puccini lost a sister, distracted him from his work. The first draft was completed on 20 April 1918, and Puccini continued to refine and orchestrate it through the summer of 1918.

With the trilogy complete, Puccini had to decide on a place for the premiere. In 1918, travel was risky and uncertain. Puccini received an offer from Buenos Aires which he refused, unwilling to have so complex a work first performed overseas in his absence. He finally agreed that the premiere could take place at the Metropolitan Opera in New York, without his being there, on the basis of performing instructions which he supplied to the conductor. Gianni Schicchi proved to be the last opera completed by Puccini.

== Performance history ==
=== Early performances ===
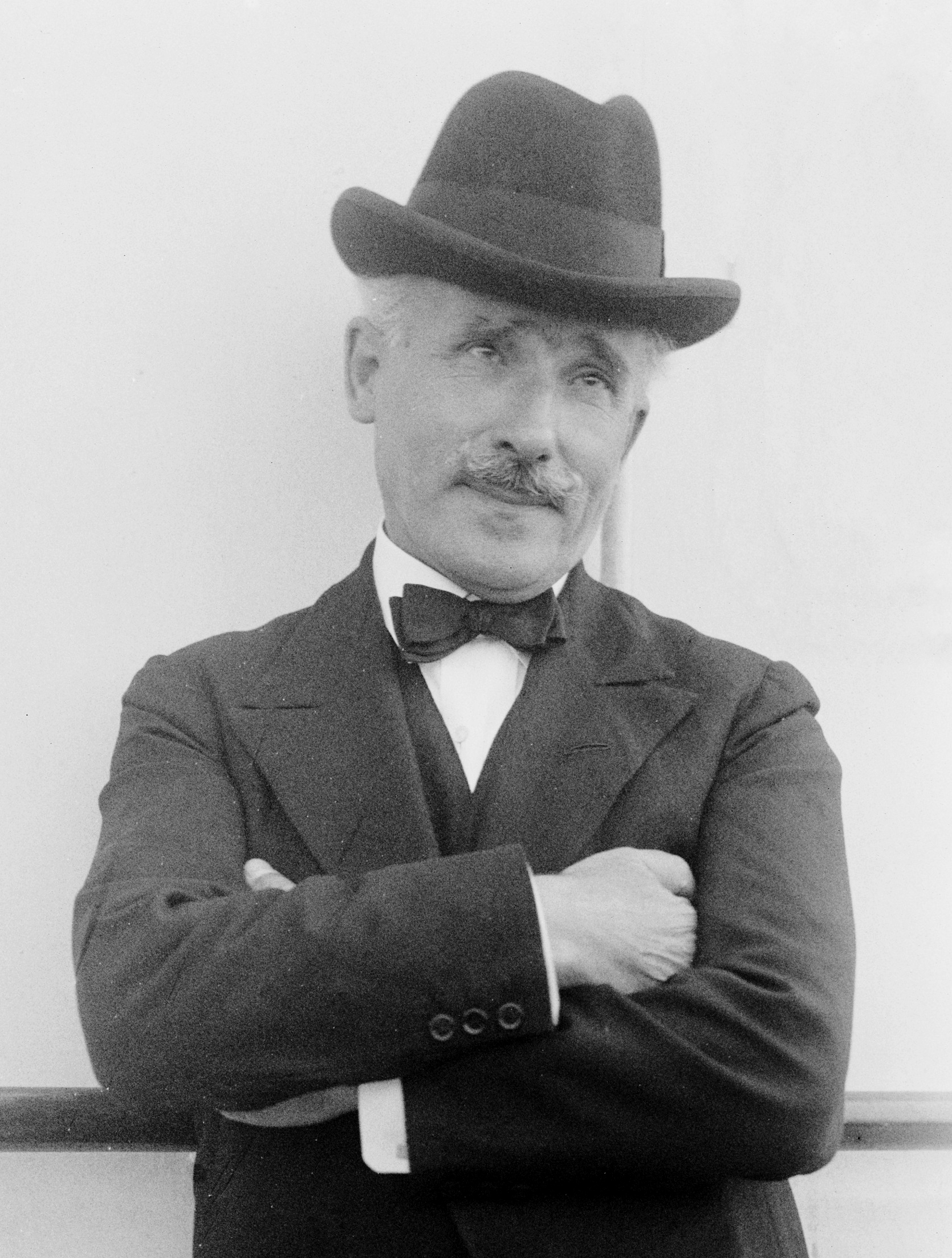
Arturo Toscanini, whose appointment to conduct the British premiere of Il trittico was vetoed by Puccini

Gianni Schicchi was first performed at the Metropolitan Opera on 14 December 1918, with Roberto Moranzoni conducting, as the final part of Il trittico. While the sold-out house showed polite enthusiasm for Il tabarro and Suor Angelica, Gianni Schicchi was, in the words of the New-York Tribune's critic, "received with uproarious delight". In the Evening Sun, W.J. Henderson called it "one of the most delightful bits ever put upon the Met stage". The undoubted "pearl of the evening", he said, was Lauretta's aria "O mio babbino caro" which, despite a public notice forbidding encores, was repeated through popular insistence. The only singer to appear in all three works was American soprano Marie Tiffany, who played one of the lovers in Il tabarro, a lay sister in Suor Angelica, and Nella in Gianni Schicchi. Il trittico was performed at the Met's Philadelphia opera house on 17 December with the same cast, before returning to New York for five more performances during the 1918/19 season.

At the time of the New York premiere, Il trittico was in rehearsal in Rome in preparation for an Italian premiere at the Teatro Costanzi. Puccini wrote Tito Ricordi that the rehearsals were going slowly, but that the orchestra sounded fine, at least in Gianni Schicchi. The Italian premiere, more important to Puccini than the New York world premiere, took place on 11 January 1919. Gianni Schicchi was again warmly received, more so than the first two operas of Il trittico. Among those dissatisfied by the triptych was Puccini's friend, the conductor Arturo Toscanini, who was in the audience for the Rome premiere. Toscanini was disgusted by the verismo of Il tabarro, and left the performance after the first curtain. This caused a rift in his relationship with Puccini, who stated that he would not allow "this god" to conduct the London premiere, though the two were later reconciled. At the Rome premiere, the part of Rinuccio was sung by the Canadian tenor Edward Johnson, a future general manager of the Met. Johnson later recalled that, at the composer's request, he had dragged a mock-reluctant Puccini from the wings to acknowledge the house's applause.

In 1919, Puccini visited London to discuss plans for the following year's Covent Garden premiere of Il trittico. This took place on 18 June 1920; King George V and Queen Mary were present, and called Puccini to their box to give him their congratulations. With Toscanini not considered, Puccini hoped that Sir Thomas Beecham would conduct the premiere, but he declined and Gaetano Bavagnoli conducted. Once again, only Gianni Schicchi was received with real warmth.

Other early performances included the October 1920 production of Il trittico in German, at the Vienna State Opera. In the years following the premiere, Puccini made modifications to the three operas, but Gianni Schicchi required few. The principal change was to Rinuccio's arioso, "Avete torto", which was set in a higher pitch to take better advantage of the tenor voice.

By 1920 Puccini was facing increasing pressure, not only from impresarios but also from his publishing firm, Casa Ricordi, to allow Il trittico to be broken up and presented separately. Opera houses first wanted to omit Suor Angelica, which had proven the least popular of the three, but some wished to omit Il tabarro as well. Puccini had left London confident that Il trittico would gain a place in the Covent Garden repertoire, but soon learned that the opera house's director, Henry V. Higgins, had removed Suor Angelica, feeling that the audience disliked it. In fact, Higgins would never stage it again. Puccini vociferously objected, as did his longtime London friend, Sybil Seligman, to no avail. Higgins then decided to remove Il tabarro, and stage Gianni Schicchi together with a Russian ballet presentation. Puccini retorted, "This is a real betrayal", but in the end gave in and permitted the performance. Puccini, however, was still convinced that the three works should be performed together and that his original conception was being "brutally torn to pieces". The Metropolitan Opera joined in the dismemberment: after 1920, it would not again present the three operas together until 1975.

=== Later performances ===
Gianni Schicchi returned to the Met in 1926, after Puccini's death, shorn of the other two parts of its operatic triptych, but instead mated to Ruggero Leoncavallo's two-act opera Pagliacci. The 1926 production, by Wilhelm von Wymetal, featured sets by Joseph Novak. In the following years at the Met, Gianni Schicchi would form part of a bill with such diverse works as Engelbert Humperdinck's Hänsel und Gretel, Italo Montemezzi's L'amore dei tre re, and even be incestuously mated with Puccini's own La bohème. In 1952, Novak's sets were revised by Wilhelm von Wymetal in a production which remained in service until 1958.

Among the leading singers associated with the opera, Tito Gobbi was particularly prominent in the 1950s and 1960s. He first sang the role of Schicchi in the Rome production in 1951; in subsequent years he appeared in further Rome seasons, in Bologna, and at La Scala, Milan, where Renata Scotto sang Lauretta in Carlo Maestrini's production. Gobbi directed and sang in the 1969 production at the Teatro Comunale di Firenze, and later that year performed in and directed the same version at the August 1969 Edinburgh Festival.

In 1974, the Met gave Gianni Schicchi its first new production since 1926. The production, by Fabrizio Melano, was paired with the Met debut of Bartók's Bluebeard's Castle. The following year, the Met revived Il trittico in the original form, combining the Melano production with new productions for the other two operas by the same director. The 1975 performance of Gianni Schicchi featured Renata Scotto as Lauretta. Scotto also played the two other Il trittico heroines, a feat she repeated later that season, on tour, and when the three operas were again presented by the Met in 1981. When the production was revived again by the Met in 1989, Teresa Stratas sang the "trittico hat-trick". Lili Chookasian sang the mezzo-soprano leads in all three operas (Zita in Gianni Schicchi) and Cornell MacNeil played Schicchi.

Glyndebourne Festival Opera put on a 2004 double bill of Gianni Schicchi and Rachmaninoff's The Miserly Knight, in which the sets for the two operas (designed by Vicki Mortimer) are back-to-back on a turntable.

In 2007, Los Angeles Opera announced that it would be staging Il trittico in the 2008/2009 season, with Woody Allen making his operatic directing debut in Gianni Schicchi. The production starred baritone Sir Thomas Allen, soprano Laura Tătulescu, and tenor Saimir Pirgu. A 2015 performance, then directed by Matthew Diamond and starring Plácido Domingo in the title role, was filmed for television in association with various international broadcasters, such as Westdeutscher Rundfunk, ARTE, and NHK.

The 2007 Royal Opera House production by Richard Jones updated the action to a shabby 1940s Italy of "unemptied chamber pots, garish floral wallpaper and damp ceilings", with Bryn Terfel in the title role "a masterpiece of monstrous vulgarity". In the 2009 revival of this production, Schicchi was sung by Thomas Allen, while Gwynne Howell, as Simone, celebrated 40 years with the Royal Opera.

In a 2023 San Diego Opera production, mezzo-soprano Stephanie Blythe performed the baritone role of the title character, Gianni, becoming the first woman to do so.

=== Critical reception ===
In reviewing the New York premiere, the critics greeted Gianni Schicchi warmly; most reviewers found it to be the best of the three operas. New York Herald Tribune critic Henry Krehbiel described it as "so uproariously funny ... so full of life, humor, and ingenious devices". The New York Times reviewer James Huneker considered the opera to be "a rollicking, madcap scherzo, overflowing with merry deviltries ... And the last shall be first." Huneker praised De Luca as "a most engaging rascal, fit for a minor niche in Moliere's gallery". The Times critic was also amused by Marto Malatesta as "The 'Kid' Gherardino, who is spanked by the irate family".

Rome's critics gave Il trittico as a whole a warmer reception but still saw Gianni Schicchi as the best of the three. Alberto Gasco of La tribuna noted that, "In terms of harmonic technique, Il tabarro and Schicchi advance quite startling elements of novelty. Nothing that contemporary art has produced escapes the studious and astute Giacomo Puccini." Gasco also stated that while many critics were waiting for the first two operas with their fists drawn, Gianni Schicchi disarmed these "hired assassins" with a "single glance". An anonymous reviewer in L'idea nazionale felt that the three works comprised a unified whole, but feared that Puccini was becoming less inventive. L'idea nazionale was a nationalist newspaper, and praised Puccini for returning to an Italian subject "after so many useless Japanese, American, Parisian digressions".

Modern productions, including those in an updated context, have been generally well received. Describing the 2004 Glyndebourne pairing with The Miserly Knight as "flip sides of the same coin", reviewer Edward Seckerson in The Independent found the Schicchi performance "a triumph of ensemble directing and playing, ... wickedly observed, sharp, focussed and funny". The New York Times gave a positive review to the Woody Allen 2008 production, which is set in a crowded tenement in which the boy Gherardino is practising knife thrusts. However, the critic questioned Allen's altered ending, in which Schicchi is stabbed by Zita as he addresses the audience. Los Angeles Times critic Mark Swed deemed Allen's production one of the top ten moments in classical music for 2008, and applauded it for "hilarious wit and engaging musicality". Allen Rich of Variety praised the piece, though he disliked Allen's idea of beginning the opera with a montage of old film clips, with credits featuring mock-Italian names.

== Music ==
Giuseppe Verdi said of Puccini, early in the latter's career, that "the symphonic element dominates in him", and Gianni Schicchi has been compared by later analysts to that of the final presto movement of a three-movement symphony. With the fast-moving pace of the work, the set pieces are given a simpler melodic structure than those in the other two parts of the triptych. On stage, with the commedia dell'arte references, a humorous atmosphere is established from the very beginning. However, the music itself is of the 20th century; Edward Greenfield refers to its "dissonant modernity", with simultaneous clashing chords suggesting that "Puccini was beginning to think in bi-tonal terms". Alongside these dissonant passages are others which opera scholar Julian Budden calls "bland, schoolroom diatonism".

The opera was originally scored for a large opera orchestra. The 1918 Ricordi edition calls for piccolo, two flutes, two oboes, cor anglais, two clarinets, bass clarinet, two bassoons, four horns, three trumpets, three trombones, trombone basso (cimbasso), timpani, percussion, off-stage bell, harp, celesta, and strings. A reduced arrangement by Argentine conductor and composer Ettore Panizza published in 1954 reduced the winds to two flutes (one doubling piccolo), one oboe, two clarinets, one bassoon, two horns, two trumpets, and one trombone.

Puccini's score is built around a series of motifs that recur through the opera, generally representing characters, situations and moods though sometimes without specific associations. The opening motif is a rapid burst of rhythmic music, described by Greenfield as of "almost Stravinskian sharpness", which quickly transforms into a mock-solemn dirge depicting the hypocritical grief of the Donati relatives. This juxtaposition of the humorous and the solemn pervades the opera; critic Ernest Newman suggests that it "keeps us perpetually suspended between the comic and the tragic". Other principal motifs include the theme associated with the lovers Rinuccio and Lauretta, introduced in Rinuccio's first solo "Salvati! Salvati!", and a short, formal woodwind statement that represents Donati's will. Rinuccio sings the name "Gianni Schicchi" to a jaunty four-note phrase which becomes Schicchi's personal motif, and it is heard again as Schicchi knocks on the door before his first appearance. The best-known theme in the opera, that associated with Lauretta, is introduced in the second part of Rinuccio's aria "Avete torto". The theme is briefly played on clarinet and violin as Lauretta enters with Schicchi, before its full expression in "O mio babbino caro".

Budden dismisses the view that Lauretta's aria, at the midpoint of the opera, was a concession to popular taste; rather, "its position at the turning point of the action is precisely calculated to provide a welcome moment of lyrical repose". Andrew Davis, in his book on Puccini's late style, notes that Lauretta's aria and the two interruptions by the young lovers ("Addio, speranza bella") as Schicchi mulls over the will, constitute interruptions in the Romantic style, delivered during a lengthy sequence of non-Romantic music. Another interruption, both dramatically and musically, is that provided by the appearance of Doctor Spinelloccio. The doctor's dissonant harmonies contrast sharply with the scena music for Schicchi and symbolise Spinelloccio's place as an outsider to the dramatic action of the opera.

The music historian Donald Jay Grout has written that in this opera Puccini's comic skill is "seen at its most spontaneous, incorporating smoothly all the characteristic harmonic devices of his later period." Greenfield remarks on the score's inventiveness, imagination and flawless timing. Several critics have likened Gianni Schicchi to Verdi's Falstaff, as both are masterpieces of operatic comedy from composers more usually associated with tragedy. Both composers took the conventions of comic opera into consideration, choosing a baritone for the principal role, setting the tenor-soprano love story against family opposition to the marriage, and constructing a hoax that permits the happy ending. Charles Osborne cites in particular the trio for three female voices, "Spogliati, bambolino", as equal to anything in Falstaff, "its exquisite harmonies almost turning the unprepossessing women into Wagnerian Rhine maidens", and its lilting melody reminiscent of Rossini.

== Arias and musical numbers ==
Although the score is through-composed, within the general structure of the opera there are several identifiable numbers: four solos given to the three main characters, a trio and a brief love duet. Only Lauretta's "O mio babbino caro", the best-known of the solos, is separable from its context and can be sung as a concert piece.

"O mio babbino caro"
"O mio babbino caro" sung by Frances Alda in 1919

First lines	Translation	Performed by
Avete torto! ... Firenze è come un albero fiorito	"You're mistaken!", followed by "Florence is like a blossoming tree"	Rinuccio
O mio babbino caro	"Oh, my dear papa"	Lauretta
Ah, che zucconi! Si corre dal notaio...	"Oh, what blockheads! Run to the notary..."	Gianni Schicchi
Trio: Spogliati, bambolino	"Undress, little boy"	Nella, La Ciesca, Zita
Prima un avvertimento	"First, a word of warning"	Gianni Schicchi
Duet: Lauretta mia, staremo sempre qui!	"My Lauretta, here we'll always stay"	Rinuccio, Lauretta

== Recordings ==
Despite its popularity as a stage work, Gianni Schicchi was not available as a recording until after the Second World War, a neglect described by a Gramophone reviewer as "extraordinary". One of the earliest recordings, a Turin Radio 1950 broadcast performance conducted by Alfredo Simonetto, was praised for its lively presentation but was considered by the critic Philip Hope-Wallace to be "too rough a piece of recording to be warmly recommended". By contrast, the 1958 recording under Gabriele Santini, with a cast including Tito Gobbi and Victoria de los Ángeles, was still being discussed nearly 50 years later as the classic performance, with Gobbi's singing at a standard rarely equalled. Among more recent recordings, that of the complete Trittico with the London Symphony Orchestra under Antonio Pappano (1998) has been generally recommended. There are numerous video recordings now available.
