= Peter Ibbetson (opera) =

Opera by Deems Taylor

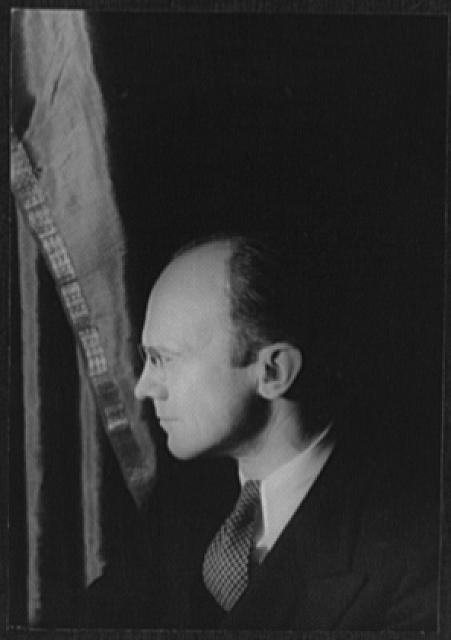
Deems Taylor

Peter Ibbetson is an opera in three acts by American composer Deems Taylor from a libretto by the composer and Constance Collier, based on the 1891 novel by George du Maurier.

== Performance history ==
Peter Ibbetson was first performed at the Metropolitan Opera in New York City on 7 February 1931 and it appeared in four seasons for a total of 22 performances (in the house and on tour) until 1935 and the retirement of the two singers who created the starring roles, Lucrezia Bori and Edward Johnson. The opera later opened the 1933–34 Met season and was broadcast twice, in 1932 (when the operas were still being broadcast only in part) and again in 1934. Among those appearing in the 1933–34 run was eight-year-old June Lockhart as Mimsy.

The opera was performed at the Ravinia Festival with the Chicago Symphony Orchestra in 1931 with Johnson, Bori, and Léon Rothier reprising their roles from the Met production. Alfredo Gandolfi, who had a minor part at the Met premiere, took on the role of Colonel Ibbetson at Ravinia with Florence Macbeth as Mrs. Deane.

On 29 June 1960 the Empire State Music Festival presented a performance of Peter Ibbetson which was broadcast. Licia Albanese was coached in the part of Mary by its creator, Lucrezia Bori.

In 1999 the opera was revived in concert form by the Seattle Symphony Orchestra with Lauren Flanigan as Mary.

== Roles ==
Role	Voice type	Premiere Cast, February 7, 1931 (Conductor: Tullio Serafin)
Peter Ibbetson	tenor	Edward Johnson
Colonel Ibbetson, his uncle	baritone	Lawrence Tibbett
Mary, Duchess of Towers	soprano	Lucrezia Bori
Mrs. Deane	mezzo-soprano	Marion Telva
Mrs. Glyn, her mother	contralto	Ina Bourskaya
Achille, proprietor of "La tête noire"	tenor	Angelo Badà
Major Duquesnois	baritone	Léon Rothier
The Chaplain of Newgate Prison	baritone	Louis D'Angelo
Charlie Plunkett	tenor	Giordano Paltrinieri
Guy Mainwaring	baritone	Millo Picco
Footman	tenor	Marek Windheim
Diana Vivash	soprano	Phradie Wells
Marie	soprano	Santa Biondo
Madge Plunkett	mezzo-soprano	Grace Divine
Victorine	soprano	Philine Falco
A Sister of Charity	mezzo-soprano	Minnie Egener
Manservant	baritone	Alfredo Gandolfi

== Synopsis ==
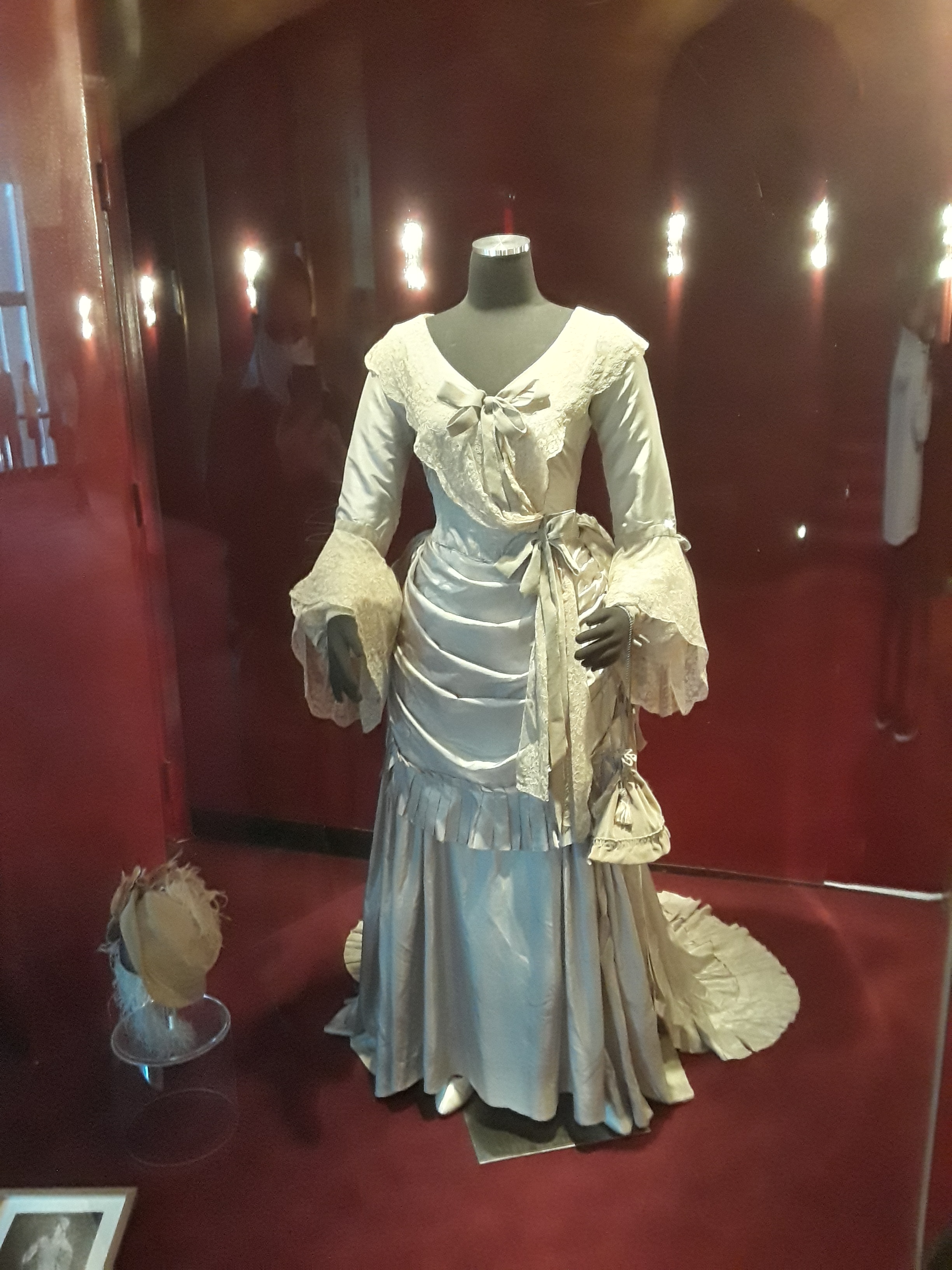
One of Lucrezia Bori's costumes from Peter Ibbetson, on display at the Metropolitan Opera House in 2021.

Time: From the 1850s to the 1880s
Place: England and France

=== Act 1 ===
A party at an English country house, 1855

The oily and vain Colonel Ibbetson is trying to flirt with Mrs. Deane, and in an aria insists on reciting an "original" poem. Peter joins the party late and brings in the poem, which is actually by Alfred de Musset, exposing his uncle as a fake. The Colonel curses Peter, and there is a tense moment, but the party resumes as Peter and Mrs. Deane become friends. As Peter recounts his melancholy circumstances, a longing theme, which will return many times in the course of the opera, accompanies the words "only you..." Peter tells Mrs. Deane of his childhood friend Mimsy, "toujours mal à la tete", and of her talent called "dreaming true", whereby one could go anywhere in place or time.

The Colonel enters as Peter leaves and tells Mrs. Deane that Peter is actually his son, as he boasts of his affair with Peter's mother. Mrs. Deane is horrified. Taylor used a leitmotiv-type technique, with backwards and forwards references that keep the characters in place. Strong emotions are captured by a rich lyric flow, and inventive orchestration.

Mary, the Duchess of Towers, (actually the long-lost Mimsy) enters. During Mary's aria she and Peter seem to recognize each other.

=== Act 2 ===
The Paris suburb of Passy, two years later

Peter is visiting his boyhood home and meets the aged and senile Major Duquesnois who does not remember him or Mimsy. The solo grows in excitement as the old Major seems to recall, but it drops off as his mind fails. The Duchess of Towers arrives, also visiting. Peter sees her and, in the first "Dream Scene", he and Mary visit the garden of their youth. Peter then sees the Colonel forcing himself on Peter's mother, and tries to break it up, but it is only a dream. When he awakens, Peter meets Mary and a recognition scene follows. When Peter says that he was once a little French boy whose name was Gogo, Mary repeats his name tenderly, and they recognize each other. Peter relates his dream and, of course, Mary knows about it. Peter longs for her but she tells him they will never meet again.

=== Act 3 ===
Scene 1

Mrs. Deane has come to see the Colonel to ask him to leave her alone. Mrs. Deane's mother shows Peter the letter revealing the truth, that Peter is in fact the Colonel's son. Peter insists upon confronting the Colonel alone, and in the heated discussion which follows, accidentally kills him.

Scene 2

It is the morning of Peter's execution. He wants to die, but there is a message from Mary, who has secured a commutation to life in prison. Thus, he can "dream true" and be with her every night. Peter dreams, and there is a long duet with Mary.

Scene 3: 30 years later

Mrs. Deane has come to visit the dying Peter with the news that Mary is dead. Peter knows it: she did not come to him in the dream the previous night. As Peter dies, Mary appears, and in a romantic ending, they go off to an eternal life together.

== Recordings ==
- 1934 broadcast: This has been preserved and issued, in excerpted form, on the "Edward J Smith Golden Age of Opera" LP label and, subsequently, complete on the same producer's UORC label.
- 1999: Anthony Dean Griffey, Lauren Flanigan, Richard Zeller; Seattle Symphony Chorale and Seattle Symphony; Gerald Schwarz. Naxos, 1999/2009. (An excerpt from the Albanese performance is included)
