= Florence Macbeth =

American opera singer

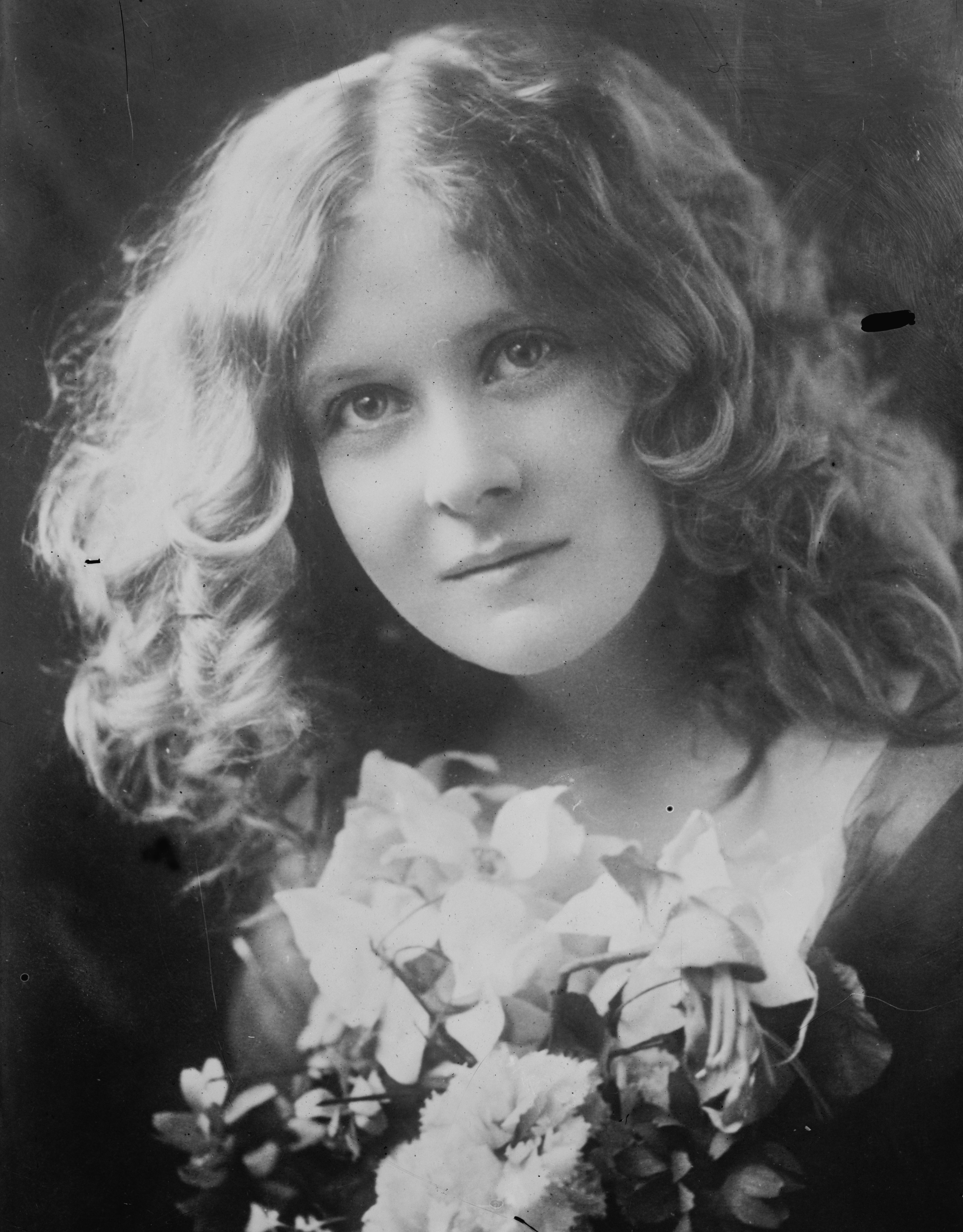
Florence Macbeth

Florence Mary MacBeth (January 12, 1889 – May 5, 1966) was an American operatic soprano.

== Biography ==
MacBeth was born in Mankato, Minnesota. She sang in opera abroad and with the Chicago Opera Association, as well as in the Mozart operas given by the Society of American Musicians in New York in 1918. She was one of the organizers of the Los Angeles Opera Guild.

Macbeth was married to James M. Cain, American author and journalist.
