= Deems Taylor =

American composer and music critic (1885–1966)

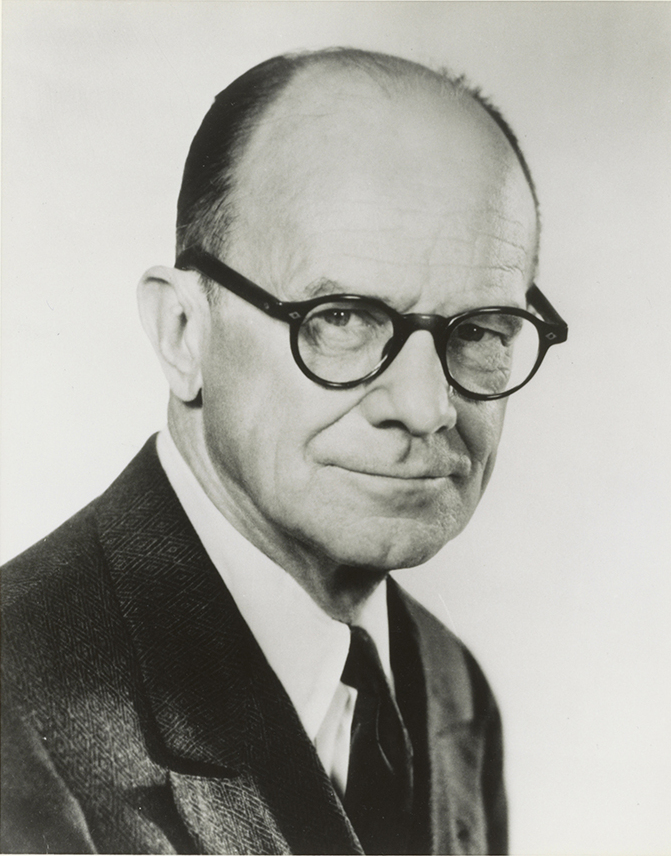
- Taylor in 1950
- Born: Joseph Deems Taylor; December 22, 1885; New York City, U.S.
- Died: July 3, 1966 (aged 80); New York City, U.S.
- Resting place: Kensico Cemetery
- Occupation: Music critic
- Spouses: Jane Anderson (m. 1910; div. 1918); Mary Kennedy (m. 1921; div. 1934); Lucille Watson-Little (m. 1945; div. 1954)
- Children: Joan Kennedy Taylor

Joseph Deems Taylor (December 22, 1885 – July 3, 1966) was an American composer, radio commentator, music critic, and author. Nat Benchley, co-editor of The Lost Algonquin Roundtable, referred to him as "the dean of American music." He was elected a member of the American Philosophical Society in 1934.

== Early life and family ==
Deems Taylor was born on December 22, 1895, New York City to JoJo and Katherine Taylor. He attended Ethical Culture Elementary School, followed by New York University.

Taylor married three times. His first wife was Jane Anderson. They were married in 1910, but divorced in 1918. In 1921, he married Mary Kennedy, who was an actress and a writer. They had a daughter, Joan Kennedy Taylor, in 1926, and divorced in 1934. He was involved romantically with soprano Colette D'Arville after his divorce. Taylor married a third and last time in 1945, to costume designer Lucille Watson-Little. They were divorced eight years later.

Taylor died on July 3, 1966, of leukemia at the age of 80. He is interred at Kensico Cemetery in Valhalla, New York.

== Career ==
=== Composer ===
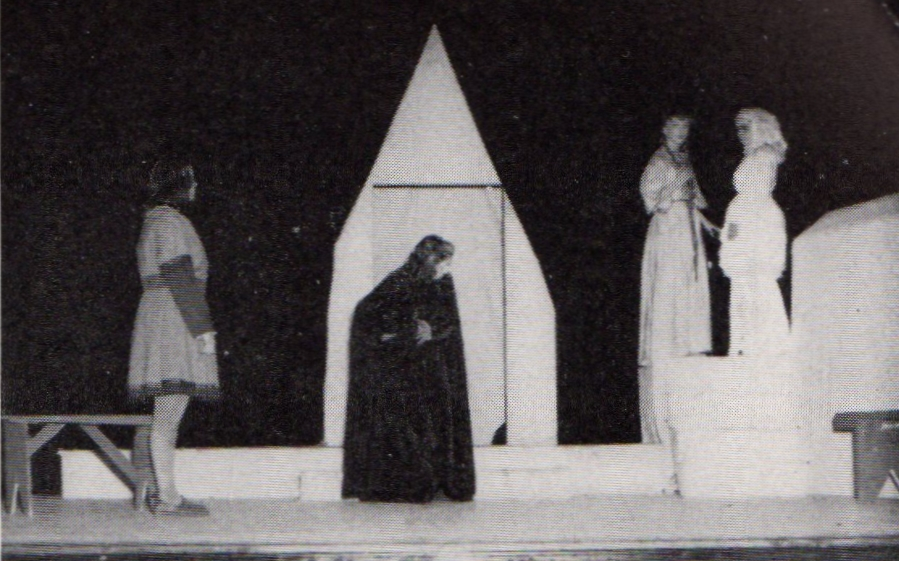
A 1948 Shimer College performance of The King's Henchman.

Taylor initially planned to become an architect; however, despite minimal musical training he soon took to music composition. The result was a series of works for orchestra and/or voices. In 1916 he wrote the cantata The Chambered Nautilus, followed by Through the Looking-Glass (for orchestra) in 1918, earning him public praise and recognition. He acquired several students, including composer Mary Watson Weaver.

In 1919, Taylor gave a series of lectures on music history in Denver, Colorado. In 1921 Taylor secured a job as music critic for the New York World, a post he held when approached by the Metropolitan Opera to suggest a composer to write a new opera. He put forth his own name, and was accepted, the result being The King's Henchman, with the libretto by Edna St. Vincent Millay. Peter Ibbetson followed in 1929. The Philadelphia Opera Company performed the world premiere of his third opera Ramuntcho, an adaptation of Pierre Loti's 1897 novel of the same name, at the Academy of Music on February 10, 1942, with Dorothy Sarnoff as Gracieuse and William Hess as Ramuntcho.

Taylor's compositions were met with great initial enthusiasm. The number of Metropolitan Opera performances for The King’s Henchman and Peter Ibbetson is greater than any opera of any other American composer, and he had as many large-scale works published as any of his American-born contemporaries. Taylor's music is often witty, always deftly formed, well-timed, and entertaining. The basic style of even his later works is academically post-Romantic, resisting any influence of progressive trends except perhaps in orchestration. This conservatism, lacking sharp individual profile or sense of deep conviction, may help to explain the initial enthusiastic acceptance of Taylor's work but may also explain the fact that his music was virtually forgotten soon afterward.

=== Music commentator ===
Taylor was a promoter of classical music throughout his life. His journalism career included posts as music critic for the New York World beginning in 1921, and editor of Musical America from 1927 to 1929.

Taylor also worked extensively in broadcasting, as well as intermission commentator for the New York Philharmonic. He appeared in Walt Disney's 1940 film Fantasia as the film's Master of Ceremonies, and was instrumental in selecting the musical pieces that were used in the film, including the then-controversial Sacre du Printemps. In the long-unseen roadshow version of Fantasia, issued on DVD in 2000 and re-released on the 2010 Fantasia/Fantasia 2000 Blu-ray release, all of Taylor's voice-over work was re-recorded by veteran voice artist Corey Burton. The complete film was originally 124 minutes long, due almost entirely to the fact that Taylor's commentaries were more detailed in the roadshow version. But, the original audio elements for these longer commentaries had deteriorated to the point that they could no longer be used, so Corey Burton was selected to re-record all of the dialogue for consistency. The general release version of Fantasia, running 120 minutes, is the version most audiences are familiar with. In that version, Taylor's commentaries were severely abridged (bar the introduction to Toccata and Fugue in D Minor).

That same year, he served the same role as Master of Ceremonies for the classical portion of a "Carousel of American Music", a famous concert series held in San Francisco on September 24. The concert had Irving Berlin, George M. Cohan, Jerome Kern, Hoagy Carmichael, WC Handy, Johnny Mercer, and many more of America's top songwriting talents performing their own compositions. (The original release was titled "Cavalcade of American Music" and includes a performance of Taylor's own work "Circus Day".) The recording was added to the National Recording Registry in 2016.

He provided the commentary of the technical story behind the recording of actual cannon fire and carillon for the famous 1954 Mercury Records album, by Antal Dorati and the Minneapolis Symphony Orchestra, of Tchaikovsky's 1812 Overture – still one of the most highly regarded recordings of that piece, and the best-selling classical LP of the 1950s. Taylor also recorded commentary for other Mercury recordings: Benjamin Britten's The Young Person's Guide to the Orchestra, the 1958 stereophonic re-make of the 1812 Overture and Frederick Fennell's ground-breaking two-album "The Civil War," which featured original music played on period instruments and sound-montages, narrated by Taylor, of period weaponry and music.

In 1949, Taylor's program, Deems Taylor Concerts, was on more than 100 radio stations. He was also a frequent guest on the radio quiz program Information Please.

Taylor's work as a broadcaster, critic, and commentator ultimately overshadowed his work as a composer. He hosted and narrated several television music series and documentaries. In the early 1950s, he was also a repeat panelist on the NBC game show Who Said That? and he was a repeat panelist on What's My Line?

Taylor was also a friend of the Algonquin Round Table, a group of writers, actors and critics that met almost daily from 1919 to 1929 at Manhattan's Algonquin Hotel. He briefly dated Dorothy Parker. In the 1994 film Mrs. Parker and the Vicious Circle, Taylor was portrayed by the actor James LeGros. Taylor's other personal friendships ranged from composers George Gershwin, Vincent Youmans and Jerome Kern to novelists F. Scott Fitzgerald and Ayn Rand.

=== Author ===
Taylor wrote for many popular journals, including Vanity Fair and the New Yorker. He also wrote for the daily press. In 2007, his writings were compiled into a book by James Pegolotti under the name Deems Taylor: Selected Writings and published by Routledge. Pegolotti also wrote Deems Taylor: A Biography in 2003, an acclaimed account of the composer's life.

In 1943, Taylor published a book called A Pictorial History of the Movies, which was, to date, one of the very few books on the history of cinema. Martin Scorsese mentions the book at the beginning of A Personal Journey with Martin Scorsese Through American Movies, which was part of the Century of Cinema series in 1995.

== Deems Taylor Award ==
Taylor was the third president of ASCAP, and held the post for six years. The ASCAP Deems Taylor Awards were established in 1967 to honor his memory. The Deems Taylor Award "recognizes books, articles, broadcasts and websites on the subject of music selected for their excellence."

== List of compositions ==
The Banks o' Doon, for voice and piano	Vocal Music	
Marco Takes a Walk	Orchestral	
Fair Yolanthe (La bele Yolans), for voice and piano	Vocal Music	Art Song
The Faithless Lover (L'abandonnée), for voice and piano	Vocal Music	Folk Song Arrangement
Fanfare for Russia for brass ensemble	Chamber Music	Fanfare
Girometta, for voice and piano	Vocal Music	Folk Song Arrangement
In the Country (La vie rustique), for voice and piano	Vocal Music	Folk Song Arrangement
The King's Henchman, opera	Opera	Opera
A Lovely Light, for soprano, narrator and piano	Vocal Music	Song Cycle
May Day Carol, Op. 15	Miscellaneous (Classical)	
Nay, My Years Are Tender (Je suis trop jeunette), for voice and piano	Vocal Music	Folk Song Arrangement
Peter Ibbetson, opera, Op. 20	Opera	Opera
La petite robe (The little dress), for voice and piano	Vocal Music	
Ramuntcho	Opera	Opera
Rantin' Rovin' Robin, for voice and piano	Vocal Music	Art Song
The Siesta (La sieste), for voice and piano	Vocal Music	Folk Song Arrangement
Song to a Sleeping Child, for voice and piano	Vocal Music	Art Song
Three Century Suite, for orchestra	Orchestral	Suite
Through the Looking Glass, for orchestra, in five movements (after the novel by Lewis Carroll)	Orchestral	
Time Enough: A Man-Child's Lullaby, for voice and piano	Vocal Music	Art Song
Twenty, Eighteen, for voice and piano	Vocal Music	Art Song
The Ways of the World (Les belles maniéres), for voice and piano	Vocal Music	Folk Song Arrangement

Other compositions

- Lucrece, incidental music for the Broadway play
- Casanova, Ballet music
- Circus Day – Eight Pictures from Memory, orchestral suite
- Processional for Chorus and Orchestra
