= Comprimario =

Small supporting role in an opera

A comprimario is a small supporting role in an opera The word is derived from the Italian con primario, or "with the primary", meaning that the comprimario role is not a principal role. The term usually refers to characters who do not sing any full-length arias or long scenes.

Many singers began their careers in comprimario roles; many others end their careers that way when they become too infirm to cope with long roles; some have made a career out of singing such parts. Among the latter are singers such as Piero de Palma, Anthony Laciura, Jean Kraft, Nico Castel, Plinio Clabassi, Paul Franke, and Charles Anthony of the Metropolitan Opera.

== Notable comprimario roles ==
Notable comprimario roles, in operas which are performed often, include Don Curzio, Antonio, and Barbarina in The Marriage of Figaro, the Speaker of the Temple, the Two Men in Armor, and The First and Second Priests (the third being a speaking role) in The Magic Flute, the Police Sergeant and Ambrogio in The Barber of Seville, Count Monterone's prison guard, Count Ceprano's wife, the page, and Giovanna the nursemaid, in Rigoletto, the Messenger in Aida, the Count Lerma and the Voice from Heaven in Don Carlos, the Night Watchman in Die Meistersinger von Nürnberg, the Shepherd in Tristan und Isolde, the Steersman in The Flying Dutchman, the physician and the apparitions in Macbeth, the Judge and Silvano in Un ballo in maschera, the Forest Bird in Siegfried, the four noblemen who conspire with Friedrich von Telramund in Lohengrin, the individual Grail-knights and the Esquires in Parsifal, the First and Second Prisoners in Fidelio, the Italian Singer, the Police Officer and the Notary in Der Rosenkavalier, the Police Officer (a different one) and Shchelkalov in Boris Godunov, the Wig-Maker and the Lackey in Ariadne auf Naxos, the Wedding Registrar in Madama Butterfly, the Mandarin in Turandot, Orest's servant in Elektra, and Morales, Frasquita and Mercedes in Carmen.
