= Antonio Scotti =

Italian opera singer (1866–1936)

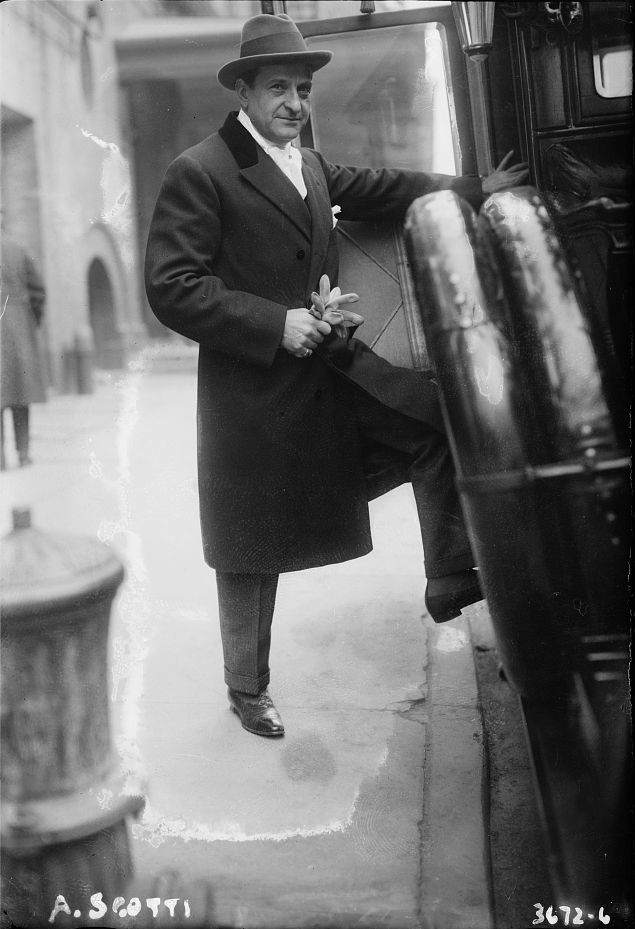
Scotti in 1915

Antonio Scotti (25 January 1866 – 26 February 1936) was an Italian baritone. He was a principal artist of the New York Metropolitan Opera for more than 33 seasons, but also sang with great success at London's Royal Opera House, Covent Garden, and Milan's La Scala.

== Life ==
Antonio Scotti was born in Naples, Italy. His family wanted him to enter the priesthood but he embarked instead on a career in opera. He received his early vocal training from Esther Trifari-Paganini and Vincenzo Lombardi. According to most sources, he made his debut at Malta's Theatre Royal in 1889, performing the role of Amonasro in Giuseppe Verdi's Aida. Engagements at various Italian operatic venues ensued, and he later gained valuable stage experience singing in Spain, Portugal, Russia and South America (Buenos Aires from 1891 to 1894 and again 1897; Río de Janeiro 1893 and Chile 1898; he also sang in Montevideo).

In 1898, he debuted at Italy's most renowned opera house, La Scala, Milan, as Hans Sachs in Die Meistersinger. This now seems a surprising choice of role for Scotti because his subsequent career did not encompass the operas of Richard Wagner.

Scotti's American debut took place in the autumn of 1899, when he sang in Chicago.

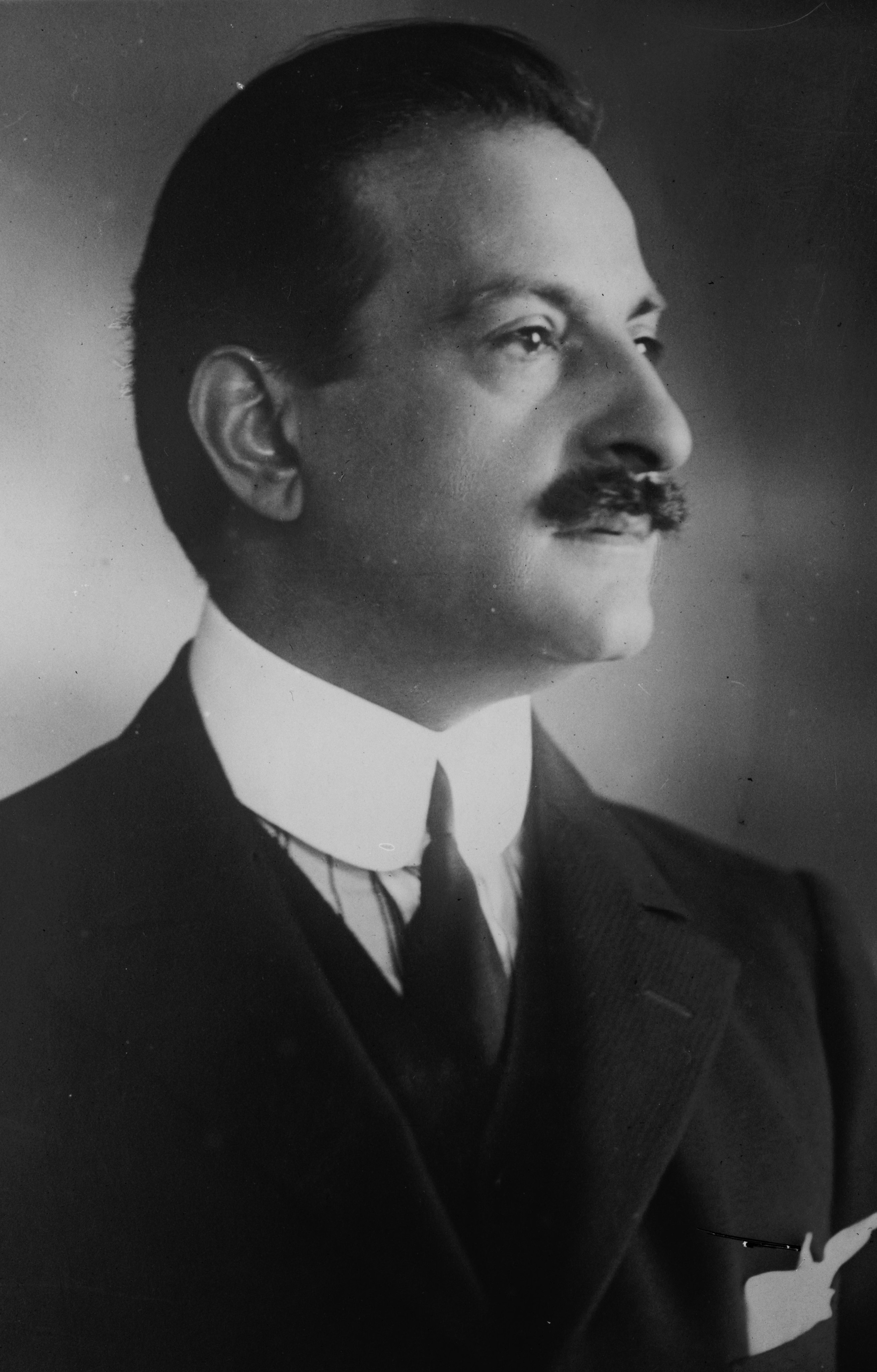
Scotti, c. 1900

On 27 December 1899, Scotti made his first appearance in New York City at the Metropolitan Opera, in the title role in Mozart's Don Giovanni. He would become an audience favourite at the Met, earning acclaim for his graceful singing of Donizetti's bel canto music as well as for the touch of elegance that he brought to his more forceful Verdi and verismo interpretations. Earlier in 1899, Scotti appeared at Covent Garden in London for the first time, singing Don Giovanni. He would return to London on many occasions prior to World War I.

In 1901, Scotti became the first baritone to sing the role of Scarpia in the American premiere of Giacomo Puccini's Tosca at the Metropolitan Opera. He also appeared in the American premieres of Francesco Cilea's Adriana Lecouvreur, Ermanno Wolf-Ferrari's Le donne curiose, Umberto Giordano's Fedora, Franco Leoni's L'Oracolo and Isidore de Lara's Messaline. He sang a variety of mainstream baritone parts during his time at the Met, including Rigoletto, Malatesta, Belcore, Iago, Falstaff, Marcello, and Sharpless in addition to Don Giovanni and Scarpia. Scotti often performed opposite his close friend Enrico Caruso and appeared in the title role of Rigoletto opposite the illustrious tenor when he made his Met debut as the Duke of Mantua in November 1903. Scotti partnered 15 different Toscas over the course of his long career at the Met.

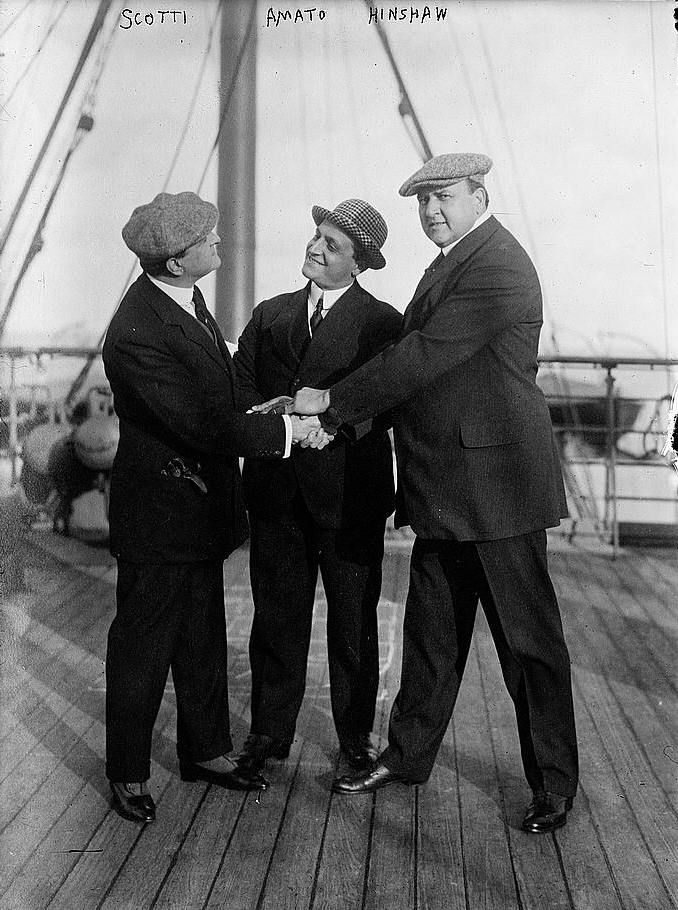
Scotti, Pasquale Amato, and William Hinshaw aboard the SS George Washington on 29 October 1912

In 1912, Scotti's arrival in the United States with Pasquale Amato and William Hinshaw for his next Met season received extensive newspaper coverage. During this year, he would also meet the restaurateur Salvatore Scoleri who would open an Italian restaurant bearing Scotti's name in Cincinnati, Ohio.

Scotti performed at the Royal Opera House, Covent Garden, on a regular basis until 1910, with additional appearances in the 1913–1914 season. During this period, he became not only London's first Scarpia but also its first Sharpless in Puccini's Madama Butterfly (in 1900 and 1905 respectively), which he also sang at the opera's Met premiere in 1907. In 1917, he was elected an honorary member of Phi Mu Alpha Sinfonia, the American fraternity for male musicians, at the New England Conservatory of Music.

Scotti performed in Paris at the Opéra Comique singing Tosca (in 1904 with Emma Eames and Emilio De Marchi, conductor Cleofonte Campanini, and in 1910, with Geraldine Farrar and Leon Beyle, the young and later-prominent conductor Gino Marinuzzi). In 1910, at the Théâtre du Châtelet with the Metropolitan ensemble, Scotti sang Falstaff conducted by Arturo Toscanini and at the Opera, in a gala performance, the third act of La bohème with Caruso and Farrar.

In 1908, Scotti sang at Salzburg in Don Giovanni, with Lilli Lehmann (Donna Ana), Johanna Gadski (Donna Elvira), Geraldine Farrar (Zerlina), with Karl Muck conducting.

Scotti formed his own troupe of singers in 1919, calling it, naturally enough, the Scotti Opera Company. He managed the troupe for several seasons while touring the United States. In January 1924, Scotti celebrated his 25th anniversary at the Met with a gala performance of Tosca. By 1930, Scotti's voice had declined considerably, but he continued to appear on the Met's roster of singers due to his outstanding histrionic ability. His final appearance at the Metropolitan Opera occurred on 20 January 1933, when he sang Chim-Fen in Leoni's L'oracolo; a role he had created in London in 1905.

Following his resignation from the Met, Scotti returned to Italy to spend his retirement. He died in Naples just three years later, aged 70, in 1936.

== Recordings and vocal characteristics ==
Scotti can be heard singing snatches of Scarpia's music in part of a clearly exciting performance of Tosca that was recorded live at the Met on faint and mould-damaged Mapleson Cylinders in 1903. He is partnered by soprano Emma Eames and tenor Emilio De Marchi, with Luigi Mancinelli conducting. On another Mapleson recording, thankfully undamaged, he can be clearly heard leading the entrance of the players in the second act of Pagliacci.

Scotti made several commercial recordings from 1902 until the outbreak of hostilities in Europe in 1914 for the British Gramophone and Typewriter Company, the affiliated American Victor Talking Machine Company and also for the Columbia Phonograph Company. Most of these recordings have been reissued on LP and CD, featuring a range of solo arias and some operatic duets and ensembles with Caruso, Marcella Sembrich and Geraldine Farrar and others. Scotti's records confirm that he was a stylish, well-trained and aristocratic singer. His voice was not especially large nor resonant, but it had a smooth, steady tone and was accurate in its execution of difficult vocal ornaments.

Having an extroverted personality on stage and off, Scotti was adept at portraying both dramatic and comic characters.

== Some notable Scotti roles ==
"O Mimì, tu più non-torni"
1907 Victor recording with Enrico Caruso as Rodolfo and Antonio Scotti as Marcello from act 4 of Puccini's La bohème

"Bella figlia dell'amore"
Rigoletto: 1907 Victor recording with Antonio Scotti, Enrico Caruso, Bessie Abott, and Louise Homer

- Baron Scarpia, Tosca
- Chim-Fen, L'Oracolo
- Rigoletto, Rigoletto
- Iago, Otello
- Posa, Don Carlo
- Don Giovanni, Don Giovanni
- Amonasro, Aida
- Dr. Malatesta, Don Pasquale
- Belcore, L'elisir d'amore
- Falstaff, Falstaff
- Marcello, La bohème
- Sharpless, Madama Butterfly
