= The Man Without a Country (opera) =

1937 American opera in two acts by Walter Damrosch

- Opera by Walter Damrosch
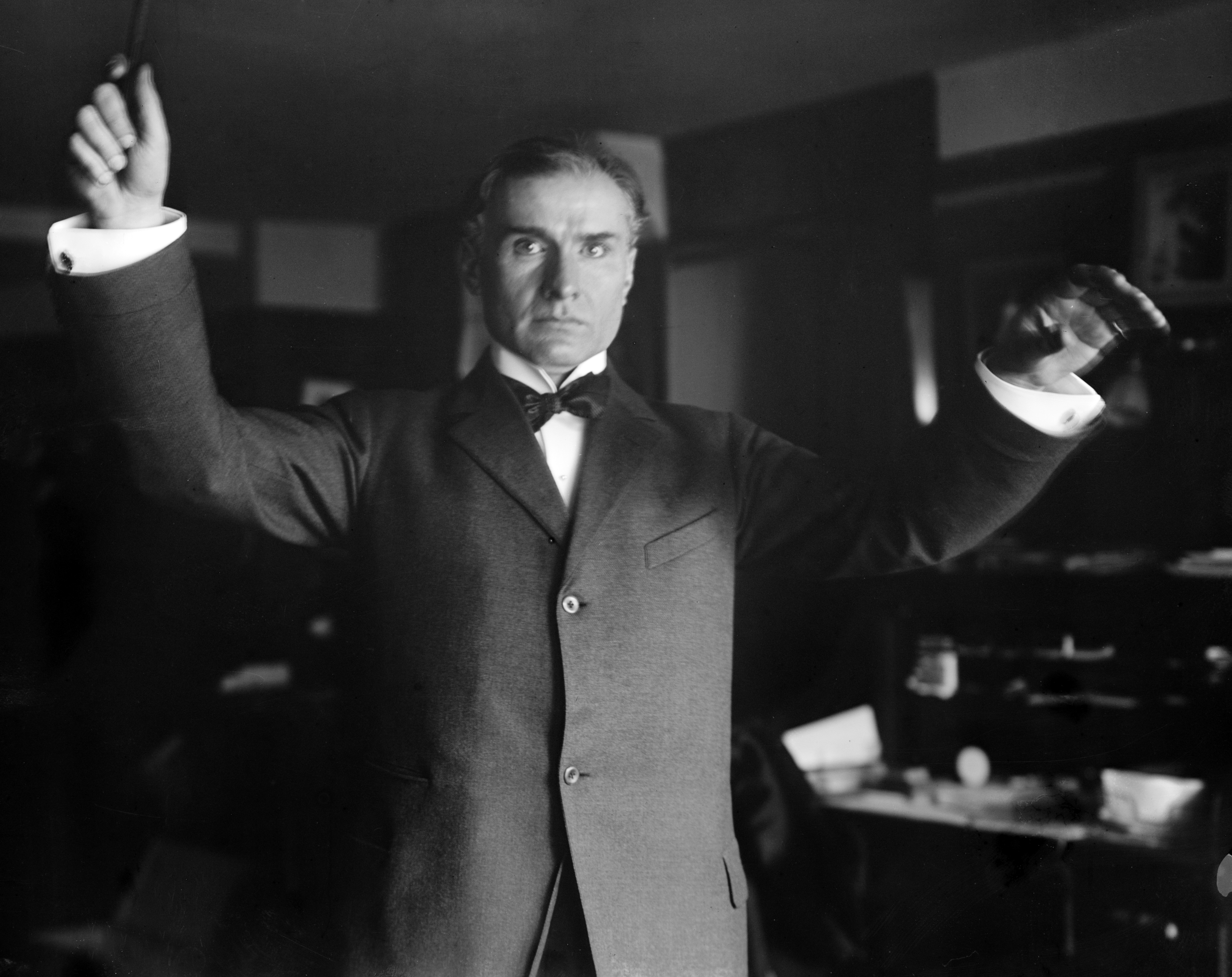
- Walter Damrosch, composer of The Man Without a Country, who also conducted the first performance
- Librettist: Arthur Guiterman
- Language: English
- Based on: "The Man Without a Country" by Edward Everett Hale (1863)
- Premiere: 12 May 1937; Metropolitan Opera, Metropolitan Opera House, New York City

The Man Without a Country is an English-language American opera in two acts and five scenes. The composer was Walter Damrosch with a libretto by poet Arthur Guiterman. The opera was based on Edward Everett Hale's 1863 short story of the same name. The opera is not sung through but includes some spoken dialogue in the manner of singspiel or opéra comique.

The work premiered at the Metropolitan Opera in New York City on May 12, 1937, in a performance conducted by Damrosch. The Man Without a Country was Damrosch's third opera after The Scarlet Letter (1896) and Cyrano (1913), the second of which also had its world premiere at the Metropolitan Opera. It was the eighteenth opera to premiere at the Met.

== Synopsis ==
The opera is set in the early nineteenth century and opens on Blennerhassett Island in the Ohio River. The main character is Lt. Philip Nolan, an officer in the United States Marine Corps. Harman Blennerhassett is throwing a party and awaits the arrival of the guest of honor, former Vice President Aaron Burr. Nolan sings to his love, Mary Rutledge, about how Burr's conspiracy will make him rich, but she tells him she cares only for him. When Burr arrives, he sings of his plot to seize the Southwest Territory from the United States. After Burr leaves, Nolan is arrested for his part in the conspiracy.

The second scene is set in a courtroom at the Marine Corps barracks at Charleston, South Carolina, where Nolan is being tried before Colonel Morgan on a charge of treason. Nolan damns the name of the United States and tells the judge he never wishes to hear it spoken again. Upon conviction, Colonel Morgan sentences Nolan to be held a prisoner at sea aboard Navy ships, never to set foot on land, and forbids anyone to speak of the United States to him. Mary vows to secure a pardon for Nolan.

The second act opens aboard the warship Guerriere, in port at Gibraltar. Nolan is wistful about the United States and his fate. He has become a patriot during his exile. Mary arrives in the following, and tells Nolan she is hopeful he will soon be pardoned. Nolan tells her the only way he can obtain forgiveness is to die for his country Stephen Decatur comes aboard and tells Nolan and Mary that the ship will be sailing to attack the Barbary pirates on the North African coast. At Mary's urging, Nolan is given command of a deck gun.

In the final scene, the Guerriere has been boarded off Tripoli. In close combat, Nolan kills the enemy commander but is himself shot. As he lies dying he dreams of being reunited with Mary. Decatur takes off his sword and places it in Nolan's dead hands.

== Performances ==
There were four performances at the Metropolitan Opera during the 1936–37 season (May 12, 17, 22, and 28) and one during the following season on February 17, 1938. Damrosch conducted the premiere and Wilfrid Pelletier conducted the subsequent four performances. The production was directed by Désiré Defrère. The May 22, 1937, performance was broadcast live over the NBC Red Network The soprano Helen Traubel made her Met debut in the role of Mary Rutledge, Nolan's love, a character not in the original story. Damrosch said "You can't write a good opera without a woman."

The opera was performed in Chicago on November 6, 1937, with Arthur Carron and Helen Traubel reprising their roles from the premiere. Damrosch conducted the performance.

== Critical reaction ==
Olin Downes of The New York Times wrote "the music never goes too deep ... It readily becomes sentimental but rises no higher and constantly resorts to cliches, or in the words of Hazlitt, launches platitudes with the fury of thunderbolts." Downes praised the singers, saying Arthur Carron "sang with marked sincerity and feeling" while Traubel had a "big voice, of unusual capacity for dramatic expression". "As for Dr. Damrosch as conductor", wrote Downes, "he excelled, inspiring all with his own authority and enthusiasm, the geniality of his temperament, the capacity to lead the interpreters and imbue them with his own fire, at the age of 75." Damrosch, reported the Times, "told the audience that several weeks ago he was quite despondent about having so little time left to write. But, he added, Deems Taylor, composer and critic, reminded him that Verdi wrote Falstaff when he was 80, and that encouraged him to go on writing."

Oscar Thompson in Musical America wrote "Damrosch has written a score of respectable craftsmanship, if of an order that looks backwards rather than forward. It is not a distinguished score but it is agreeable in its thoroughly orthodox, eclectic way—well orchestrated, well-knit and shipshape in the things that go to make an opera stage-worthy."

Walter Strauß in the Austrian magazine Tonfilm Theater Tanz said the "extremely beautiful" music was "young, true, and sensitive", and wished it could be heard in Vienna.

Sigmund Spaeth in the Review of Reviews faulted both the source material ("It is not good operatic material, even with the addition of love interest and a heroic death"), the performances ("Arthur Carron and Helen Traubel . . . sing well, but do not look like anything but the opera-singers that they are"), and the work itself ("It is not really bad at all. It just lacks completely that indefinable quality known as inspiration").

Paul Jackson wrote "Damrosch seems unable to solve the problem of fusing melodic outpourings with continuity of orchestral texture–the latter is merely supportive and does little musically to augment the expression of the text."

The score and the libretto were both published in 1937. Copyright on the opera was registered on January 25, 1937.

== Roles ==
Roles, voice types, premiere cast
Role	Voice type	Premiere cast, 12 May 1937 Conductor: Walter Damrosch
Lieutenant Philip Nolan	tenor	Arthur Carron
Mary Rutledge	soprano	Helen Traubel
Harman Blennerhassett	tenor	George Rasely
Aaron Burr	baritone	Joseph Royer
Colonel Morgan	bass	John Gurney
Stephen Decatur	speaking role	Louis D'Angelo
Parke	tenor	Nicholas Massue
Fairfax	tenor	Lodovico Oliviero
Lieutenant Pinckney	baritone	Wilfred Engelman
Lieutenant Reeve	baritone	George Cehanovsky
Negro Boatman	baritone	Donald Dickson
