= Milka Ternina =

Croatian opera singer

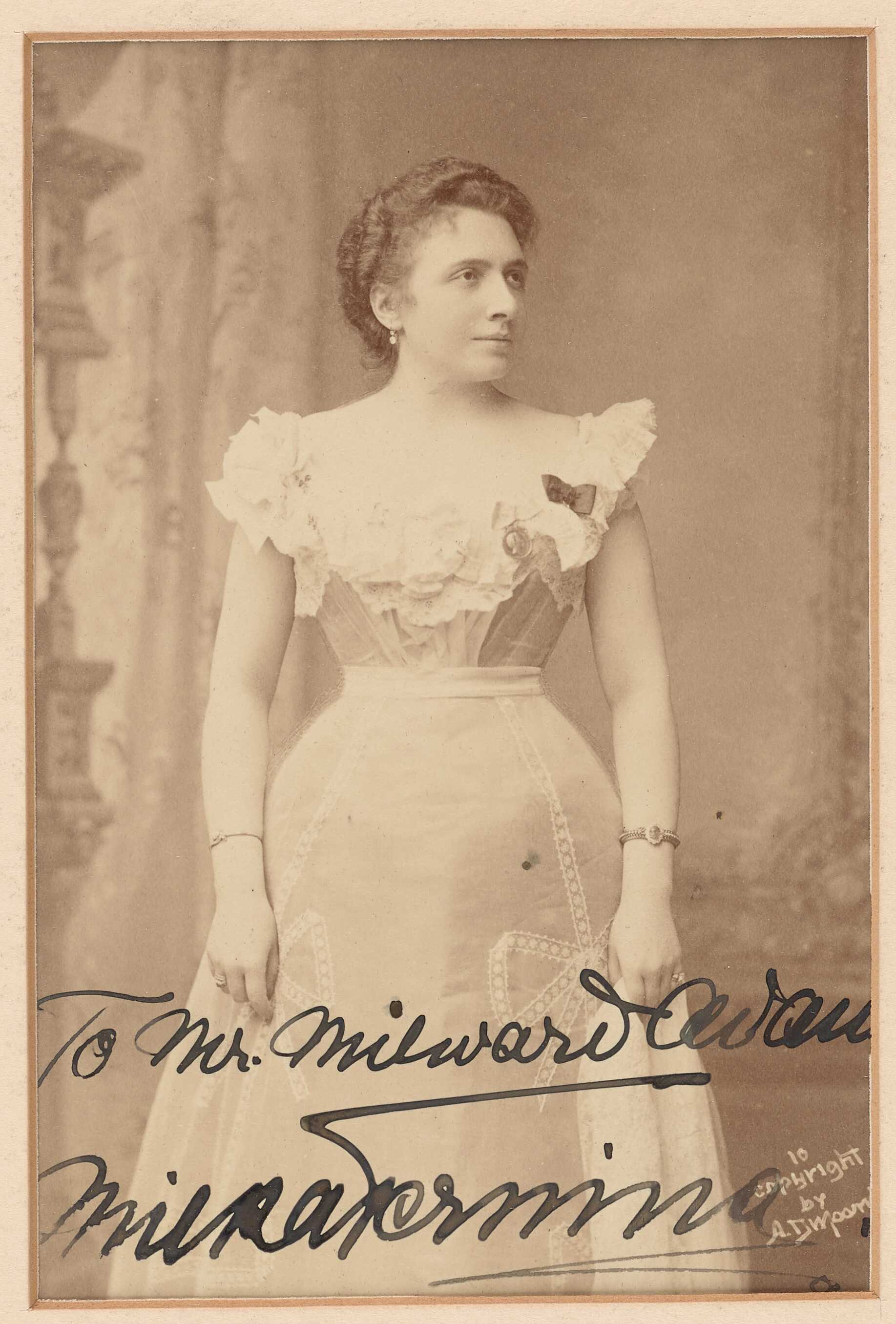
Trnina, c. 1900 (photo by Aimé Dupont; Newberry Library, Chicago)

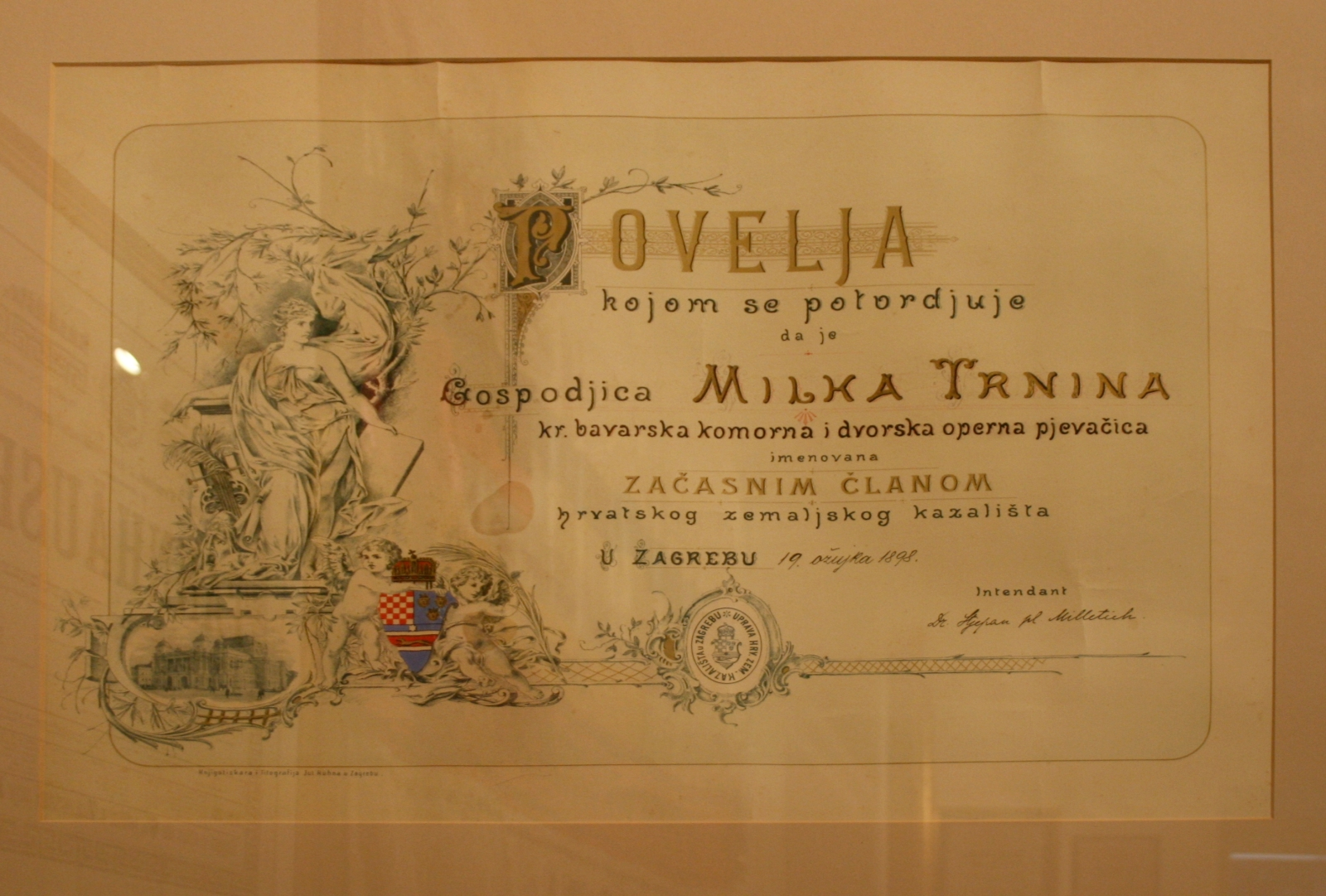
Certificate of honorary membership in the Croatian State Theater

Milka Trnina (born Katarina Milka Trnina, pronounced [katarǐːna mîːlka tř̩nina]; 19 December 1863 – 18 May 1941) was a Croatian dramatic soprano who enjoyed a high reputation in major American and European opera houses. Praised by audiences and music critics alike for the electrifying force of her acting and the excellence of her singing in both German and Italian works, her career was curtailed at its peak in 1906 by a medical condition which paralyzed a nerve in her face. She was also a voice teacher.

== Early life and education ==
A native of Vezišće (part of Križ), the young Trnina (usually referred to as Milka Ternina in English-speaking countries) studied singing privately with Ida Winterberg in Zagreb and then with Joseph Gänsbacher at the conservatory in Vienna, graduating from his class in 1883 with a gold medal. She had made her operatic debut while still a student in Zagreb, singing Amelia in an 1882 production of Giuseppe Verdi's Un ballo in maschera.

== Career ==
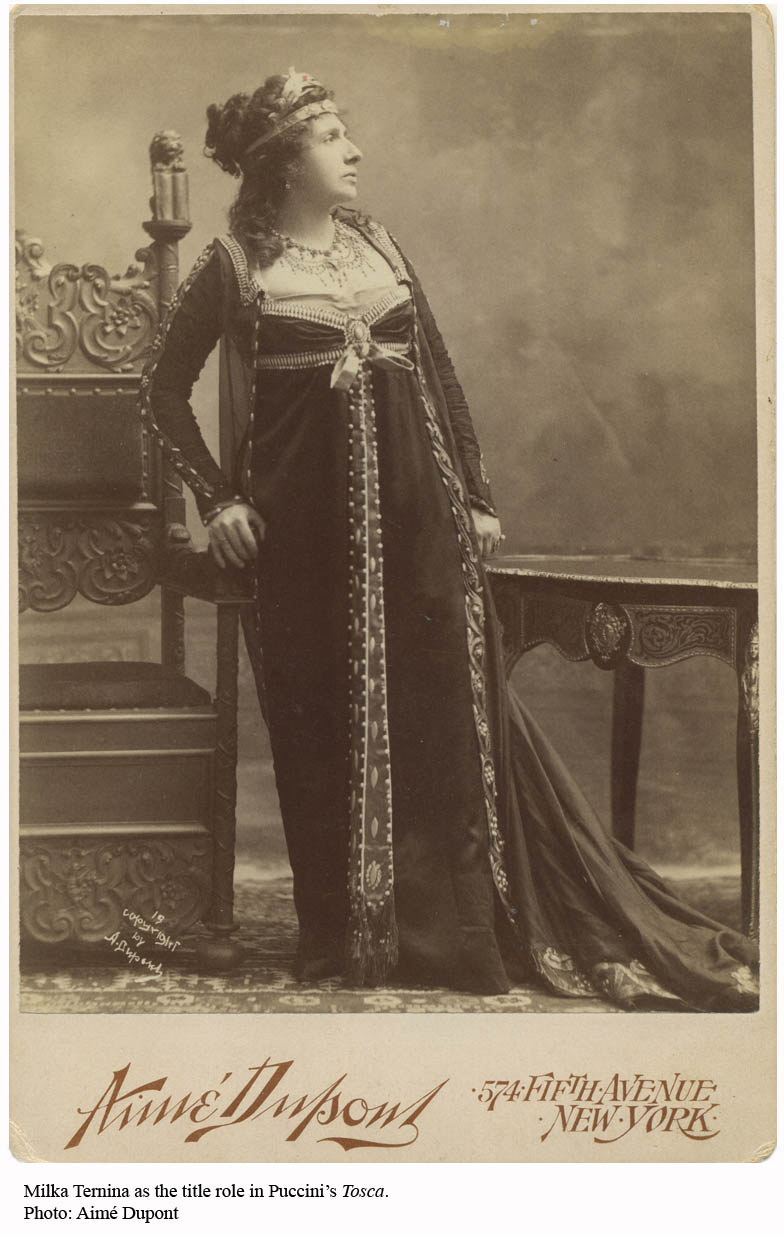
Trnina as Tosca, around the time of her Metropolitan Opera premiere in that role in 1901 (photo by Aimé Dupont).

Ternina sang initially as a full-time professional performer in Leipzig and subsequently took up a position with the resident operatic company in Graz in 1884. She stayed there for two years, acquiring a useful knowledge of stagecraft and manifesting a burning devotion to opera as a serious art form.

The conductor Anton Seidl was impressed by Ternina's potential and he recommended her to replace another acclaimed dramatic soprano, Katharina Klafsky, at the Bremen Opera. While in Bremen, she participated in a production of Richard Wagner's Ring Cycle (her first). In 1890, she was engaged by the Munich Royal Opera, where, over the next few years, she consolidated her reputation as a top-class singer and distinguished herself as an outstanding exponent of Wagnerian music dramas. She excelled, too, as Beethoven's Leonore.

Ternina's North American debut took place in Boston in 1896, when she sang Brünnhilde in Die Walküre with the Damrosch Opera Company. In 1898, she appeared for the first time in opera in London, performing Isolde in Tristan und Isolde. She would continue to appear at the Royal Opera House, Covent Garden, until 1906, achieving a total of 98 appearances there in a variety of operas.

Ternina appeared at the 1899 Bayreuth Festival in the role of Kundry in Parsifal. According to Oxford's concise operatic dictionary, this would prove to be her sole appearance at Bayreuth. On January 27, 1900, Ternina made her debut at the Metropolitan Opera in New York City as Elisabeth in Tannhäuser. During her fruitful association with the Met she sang Kundry in Parsifal's first American performance. Because this staging of the opera was not authorized by the Wagner family, she was never again invited to appear at Bayreuth, despite her stature as an artist.

Ternina famously sang the title role in the 1901 American premiere of Giacomo Puccini's Tosca, performing the part at the Met to considerable acclaim on 18 further occasions. The previous year she had been London's first Floria Tosca, too, with the composer, who had been in the audience at Covent Garden that night, describing her interpretation as "ideal". She thus became the English-speaking world's most renowned interpreter of this particular Puccini heroine.

== Retirement and later life ==
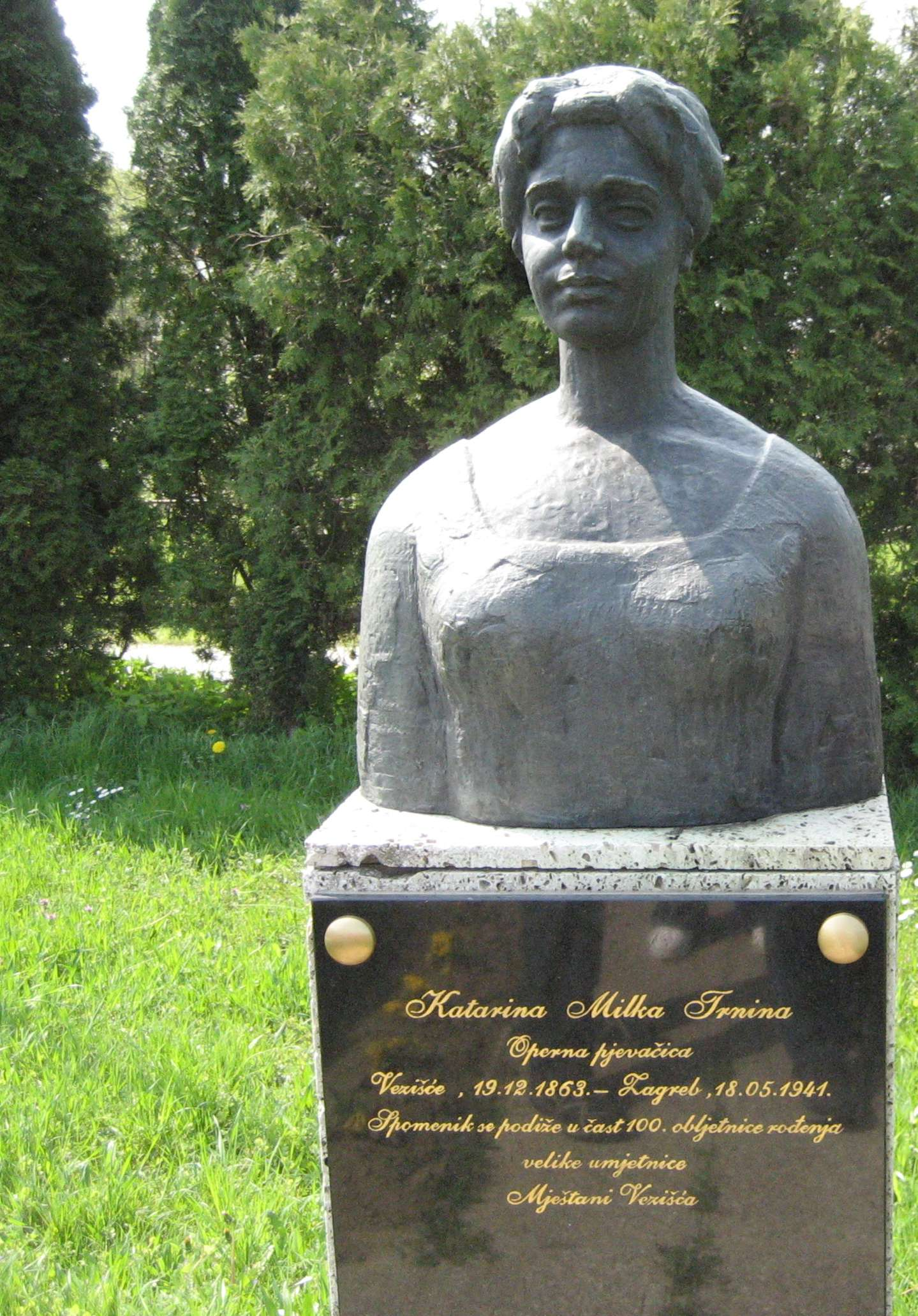
Milka Trnina memorial in Vezišće

In early May 1902, while on vacation in Switzerland, Ternina suffered an attack of facial paralysis which affected the left side of her mouth. The ailment did not yield to medical treatment and she decided to retire from the stage at the height of her powers, as she believed it was no longer possible for her to maintain the highest level of performance. Die Walküre in Munich, on September 1, 1906, was her last stage appearance.

For a year she taught singing at the Institute of Musical Art in New York City, after which she withdrew from the international music scene and returned to Zagreb. One of her pupils in New York was Lucia Dunham. Her best known pupil in Zagreb was the celebrated spinto soprano and Metropolitan Opera star Zinka Milanov.

Ternina died in Zagreb in 1941, aged 77. She did not make any commercial recordings of her voice but fragments of her singing can be discerned on Mapleson Cylinders recorded live at the Met at the start of the 20th century. These are available on a CD re-issue by Symposium Records (catalogue number 1284).
