= Emilio De Marchi (tenor) =

Italian opera singer (1861–1917)

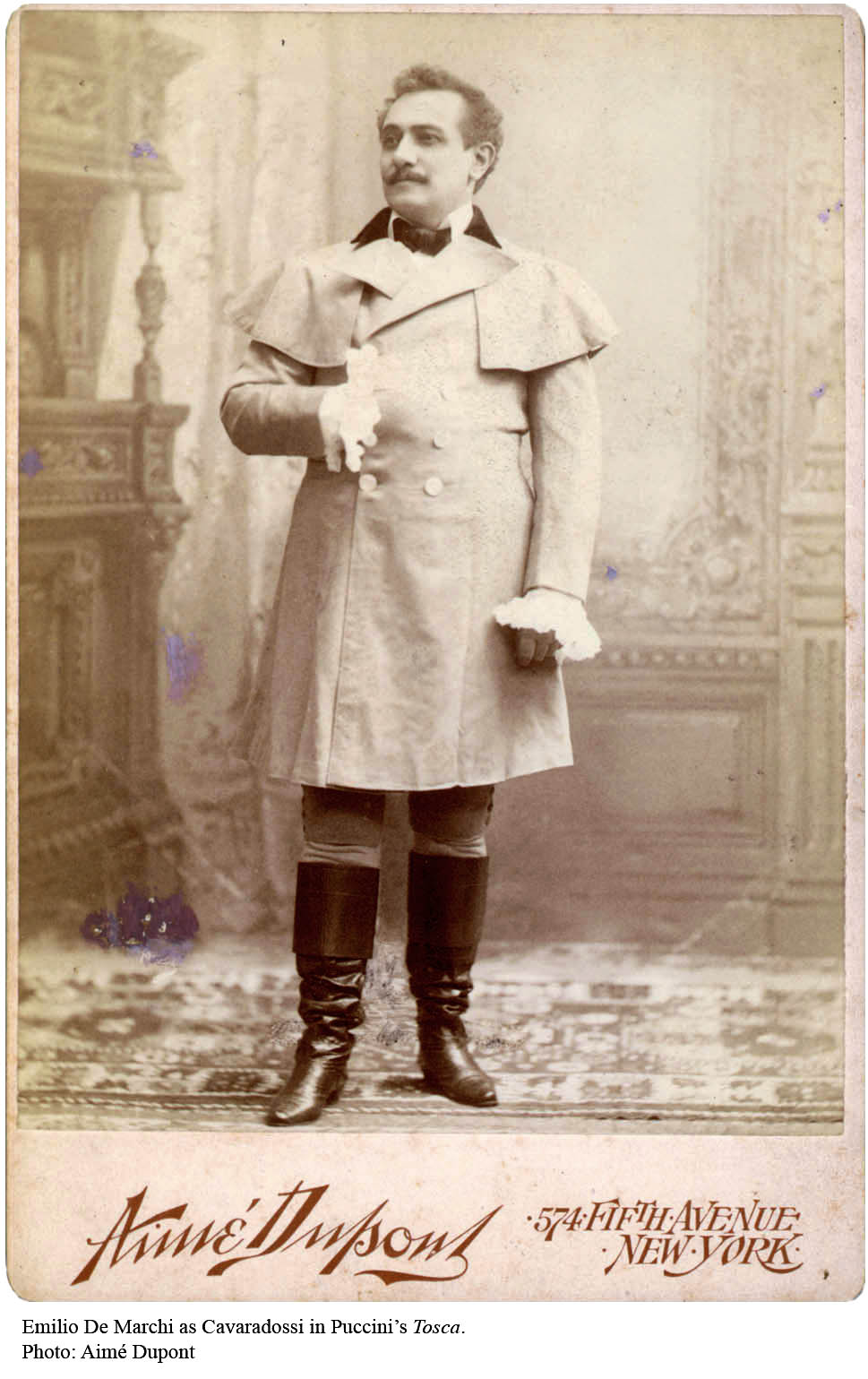
Emilio De Marchi as Cavaradossi, a role that he created in 1900.

Emilio De Marchi (Italian pronunciation: [eˈmiːljo de ˈmarki]; 6 January 1861 – 20 March 1917) was an Italian operatic tenor. He had a significant career during the late 19th and early 20th century, appearing at major theatres on both sides of the Atlantic. In 1900, he entered the annals of musical history as the creator of the role of Cavaradossi in Giacomo Puccini's Tosca. Today, however, he has largely been forgotten because, unlike many of his contemporaries, he did not leave a legacy of commercial gramophone or phonograph recordings.

== Singing career ==
De Marchi came from Northern Italy's Lombardy region; he was born in Voghera. His voice was discovered during his military service, and he received professional singing lessons. In 1886, he made his operatic debut in Milan, at the Teatro Dal Verme, as Alfredo in Giuseppe Verdi's La traviata. Over the next few years, he appeared at leading opera houses throughout Italy and Spain and was a member of a distinguished Italian operatic company which visited Buenos Aires in 1890. There he sang Don José, Enzo, and Faust (Gounod). De Marchi returned to Buenos Aires in 1895, 1896 and 1900, and his other roles were Raoul, Alfredo, Faust (Boito), Des Grieux (Puccini), Lohengrin, Tannhäuser, Turiddu, and Samson. In Buenos Aires, he was the first Rodolfo (1896), the first Cavaradossi (1900), and sang at the premiere of Beruti´sTaras Bulba (1895).

He debuted at Italy's leading opera house, La Scala, Milan, in 1898 as Stolzing in an Italian-language version of Richard Wagner's Die Meistersinger. He proved to be a success at La Scala and was chosen by the composer Puccini to sing the coveted role of Cavaradossi in the first performance of Tosca, which occurred at Rome's Teatro Costanzi on 14 January 1900. A rising young tenor named Enrico Caruso, 12 years De Marchi's junior, had hoped to create Cavaradossi; but in the end, Puccini, although greatly impressed by Caruso's voice, decided to entrust the part to the more experienced singer. When Puccini heard Caruso sing the role of Cavaradossi in Bologna the following November, he stated that he regretted his earlier decision.

De Marchi sang Cavaradossi again at London's Royal Opera House, Covent Garden, in 1901. Cavaradossi was also his debut role the following year at the Metropolitan Opera in New York City. During his New York sojourn, he sang the title role in the premiere Met production of Verdi's Ernani, which was mounted in 1903. His other Met roles were Radames, Alfredo, Manrico, Raoul, Rodolfo, Riccardo, Turiddu, Canio, Leandro (in Mancinelli´s Ero e Leandro), and Don Jose.

He returned to Italy and, in addition to a number of mainstream Italian operatic parts, he sang Max in Weber's Der Freischütz and Licinius in Spontini's La Vestale during his final seasons at La Scala. He died in Milan at the age of 56.

De Marchi did not make any commercial recordings, but he can be heard clearly in a few fragments from Tosca that were recorded on the Mapleson Cylinders during a live performance at the Met on 3 January 1903. He sang with soprano Emma Eames as Tosca and baritone Antonio Scotti as Scarpia, with Luigi Mancinelli conducting. He is also audible in excerpts from Ernani, Aida, and Cavalleria Rusticana (the latter with soprano Emma Calvé).

== Sources ==
- Grove Music Online, J. B. Steane (June 2008)
- The Concise Oxford Dictionary of Opera, Second edition, Harold Rosenthal & John Warrack (London, 1980)
- The Great Caruso, Michael Scott (London, 1988)
- Annals of The Metropolitan Opera. The Complete chronicle of performances and artists(Boston 1989)
- La Historia del Teatro Colón; by Roberto Caamaño; vol. 1. (Buenos Aires 1969).
