= Franco Leoni =

Italian composer (1864–1949)

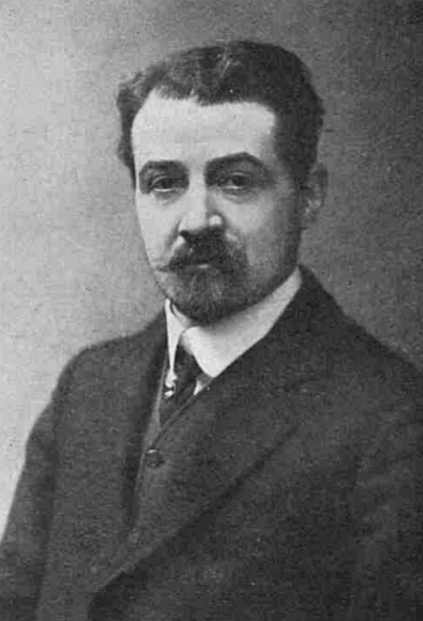
Leoni, 1904

Franco Leoni (24 October 1864 – 8 February 1949) was an Italian opera composer. After training in Milan, he made most of his career in England, composing for Covent Garden and West End theatres. He is best known for the opera L'oracolo, written for Covent Garden but taken up successfully by the Metropolitan Opera in New York. In addition to his operas, Leoni wrote several cantatas and oratorios and many ballads and other songs. He also worked as a conductor in London, both in the concert hall and in the theatre.

== Life and works ==
=== Early years ===
Leoni was born in Milan and studied music at the Milan Conservatory under Amilcare Ponchielli and Cesare Dominiceti. His opera Raggio di Luna (Moonbeam) to a libretto by Camillo Zanoni was first performed at the Teatro Manzoni in Milan in June 1890. Two years later, Leoni emigrated to England, which remained his home until 1917. At first he worked for the music publisher Chappell & Co., for whom he wrote "charming songs for our most famous vocalists." In 1896, he wrote what he called "a dramatic musical poem", "Sardanapalus", inspired by Byron's 1821 play of the same name. The work, for soloists, chorus and orchestra, was premiered at the Queen's Hall and was well reviewed, although reviewers commented on the influence of earlier composers on the score.

In 1897, Leoni's operatic version of Rip van Winkle was presented at Her Majesty's Theatre. The libretto, based on the story by Washington Irving, was by William Akerman. The score was through-composed, with no spoken dialogue, and received qualified praise from critics. One wrote: "Colour of a sort there is in the music, and some dramatic point, but of downright individuality and humour there is little" (The Times). Another commented, "Mr Leoni's instrumentation is clever, but there is a little too much of it" (Lloyd's Weekly Newspaper). A third stated, "his music flows on with the alternate suavity, passion and grace characteristic of modern Italian composers" (The Morning Post). A recurrent theme in criticisms of Leoni's music was that it was not strikingly individual: "Mr Leoni's score is throughout melodious, dramatically appropriate, well and picturesquely orchestrated … the composer's chief fault at present is his excellent memory [for] the works of Dvořák, Mascagni, Wagner, Bizet." The opera ran briefly and was taken off after a month. In 1898, Leoni presented another choral work, the cantata, The Gate of Life, which was premiered by the Royal Choral Society in March of that year and was then taken up by other choirs. Also in 1898, he took on the role of musical director for a West End show, conducting the theatre orchestra for the run of "The Topsy-Turvy Hotel" by Victor Roger and Lionel Monckton. He also took on the conductorship of the newly formed Queen's Hall Choral Society.

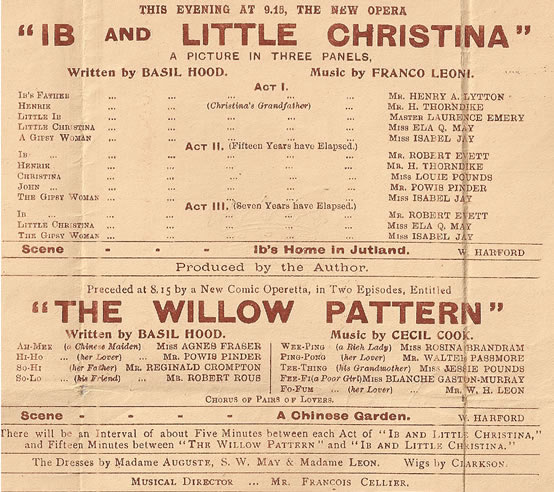
1901 programme

In 1901, Leoni wrote the music for an operatic version of Hans Andersen's children's story, Ib and Little Christina, to a libretto by Basil Hood. Styled "A Picture in Three Panels", it opened at the Savoy Theatre on 14 November 1901 together with Hood's The Willow Pattern. The Times described it as "an opera of ultra-modern type" and compared it unflatteringly to the work of Arthur Sullivan, who had died earlier in that year. The Manchester Guardian later said that "the music, though clever and attractive in many ways, was too realistic and too Southern to reflect the Northern symbolism of Andersen's story, and that its peculiar vein of passion was out of place." The opera ran for 16 performances and closed before the end of November. It was revived in London at Daly's Theatre from 11 to 13 January 1904, then transferred to the Lyric Theatre from 19 January to 5 March 1904 for a limited season of 23 matinée performances. The opera is not quite a full length piece and is played in three short scenes.

In the same year, Leoni composed incidental music for James Bernard Fagan's play "The Prayer of the Sword." Later in 1904, Leoni published a song-cycle entitled "Fairy Dreams", which was premiered by four well-known soloists, Suzanne Adams, Muriel Foster, Ben Davies and Kennerley Rumford (the husband of Clara Butt).

=== Covent Garden and later years ===
L'oracolo, premiered at Covent Garden in 1905, is a piece of operatic Grand Guignol with a kidnapping and two murders within its one hour of music. A later critic said of the work, "Hokum, but any opera that begins with three crashes, a very loud cock-crow, a chorus shouting in fake-Chinese and then launches into a vehement unaccompanied solo … has clearly got something going for it. The one-act piece, which depicts melodramatic events in and around a San Francisco opium den, had a libretto by Camillo Zanoni, based on the play The Cat and the Cherub by Chester Bailey Fernald. The London performances, conducted by André Messager with Antonio Scotti as the villain, Cim-Fen, were well received: The Observer wrote of the score, "It is never for an instant dull. … Melody he has at easy command … completely a master of his orchestra. ... His music belongs to no school save that of modernity – with a modern Italian flavour." Nevertheless, L'Oracolo made no more than a modest impact in London and dropped out of Covent Garden's repertory.

In 1908, Leoni turned again to the concert hall. Henry Wood conducted the premiere of The Bells, Leoni's "vocal scena" for baritone and orchestra, set to Edgar Allan Poe's poem of the same name. Once more, the reviews praised the skill of the scoring, but found no strong individual personality in the music. Leoni's next opera was Tzigana, to a libretto by E. Moschini, which premiered in Genoa in February 1910 and also played in Milan and in Budapest. In 1912, a revival of Tzigana was performed at the Politeama Genovese with Elsa Raccanelli in the principal role.

In 1911, Leoni's cantata, Golgotha, depicting the Gospel story of Christ's passion and crucifixion, was premiered in London, with soloists including Gervase Elwes and Clara Butt. The notices were good, ranging from polite to strongly enthusiastic. The critic of The Observer praised the work in unequivocal terms, and members of the audience wrote in endorsing his praise. The last large-scale work that Leoni composed before leaving his English domicile was Francesca da Rimini, a one-act piece based on a play by Francis Marion Crawford, given in a French version by Marcel Schwob at the Opéra Comique, Paris, in 1914. It was presented in a double bill with the French première of Falla's La vida breve. According to The Musical Times, the Falla work made the greater impact, but Leoni's also achieved a moderate success.

In 1917 Leoni left England, and returned to Italy. Thereafter he appears to have shared his time among three countries: Italy, France and England. His later operas were Le baruffe chiozzotte, to a libretto based on a play by Carlo Goldoni (1920), La terra del sogno and Falene, to libretti by C. Linati (1920). He died in London at the age of 84.

== Legacy ==
Little of Leoni's work outlived him. Gramophone recordings survive of his contemporaries Clara Butt and Frances Alda performing his songs. Later singers, including Julie Andrews and Bryn Terfel, have continued to perform his hunting song (in which the fox escapes), "Tally Ho!"

Of Leoni's operas, only L'oracolo has retained a foothold in the repertory of major opera houses. Scotti's fondness for the work led the Metropolitan Opera to stage it from time to time, and he chose it for his farewell appearance in 1933. Thereafter it was rarely performed, but it came to public attention again when the conductor Richard Bonynge made a complete recording of the piece in 1975 starring his wife, Joan Sutherland, and the veteran Tito Gobbi as the villain. That LP recording was reissued on CD in 1997. Occasional stage revivals have included those at the Curtis Institute (1949), the Philadelphia Opera (1952), the Glasgow Grand Opera Society (1994), Teatro Grattacielo in a 2007 concert performance, and the Frankfurt Opera, 2009, with another run scheduled for 2011.
