= Damrosch Opera Company =

Defunct 19th-century American opera company

The Damrosch Opera Company was an American opera company which existed from 1894 until 1900.

The company was organized by Walter Damrosch, and was meant to present German opera; in this capacity it did much to advance the cause of Richard Wagner's music in the United States. Damrosch created the company to combat what he perceived to be the growing apathy, post-1890, of the general opera-going public to German opera. More specifically, his complaints were aimed against the management of the Metropolitan Opera. The immediate impetus of the company's founding came when, in 1894, Damrosch presented concert performances of Götterdämmerung and Die Walküre.

Damrosch raised money for the company by selling his house in New York City, and he spent the summer of 1894 travelling Europe to recruit singers. Among those with whom he signed contracts were Johanna Gadski and Rosa Sucher, both of whom made their American debuts with the company; others included Max Alvary and Emil Fischer. The company opened its eight-week season in New York with a performance of Tristan und Isolde at the Metropolitan Opera, on February 25, 1895. Following this was an extensive tour; the season netted a profit of $53,000.

The company remained in business for five more years. The second season saw the addition of Milka Ternina and David Bispham to its rosters; Katharina Klafsky and her husband Otto Lohse also joined the company, but returned to Europe after the season's end. 1896 saw the premiere of Damrosch's own opera after The Scarlet Letter. With the following season came a change of name and focus for the company; becoming the Damrosch-Ellis Company, it expanded its horizons to include both Italian and French opera in addition to German. Nellie Melba and Emma Calvé both joined the company at this time. But deficits had begun to accumulate after the second season, and mounted rapidly; these forced the company to close for good in 1900.
