= Johanna Gadski =

German opera singer (1870–1932)

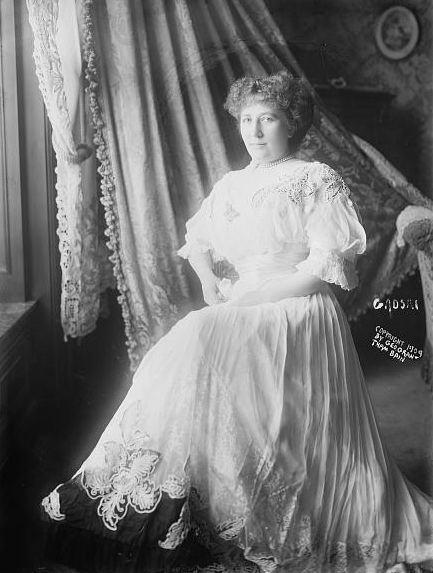
- Born: 15 June 1870; Anklam, Prussia
- Died: 22 February 1932 (aged 61); Berlin, Germany
- Spouse: Hans Tauscher
- Children: 1 daughter

Johanna Emilia Agnes Gadski (15 June 1870 – 22 February 1932) was a German dramatic soprano. She had a secure, powerful, ringing voice, fine musicianship and an excellent technique. These attributes enabled her to enjoy a highly successful career in New York City and London, performing heavy dramatic roles in the German and Italian repertoires.

== Biography ==
Gadski was born in Anklam, Prussia. After receiving a musical education in Stettin, she made her operatic debut in Berlin in 1889 in the title role of Tchaikovsky's Undina.

Gadski's studies in singing were principally with Mme. Schroeder-Chaloupka. When she was ten years old, she sang successfully in concert at Stettin. Her operatic début was made in Berlin, in 1889, in Weber's Der Freischütz. She then appeared in the opera houses of Bremen and Mainz. In 1894, Walter Damrosch organized his opera company in New York and engaged Gadski for leading roles.

In 1898, she became high dramatic soprano with the Metropolitan Opera in New York, and the following year appeared at the Royal Opera House, London. She was constantly developing as a singer of Wagner roles, notably Brünhilde in Der Ring des Nibelungen and Isolde in Tristan und Isolde. Her repertoire included forty roles.

Gadski sang at the Metropolitan Opera House in New York until 1917, when the notoriety caused by the suspicious activities of her husband, Captain Hans Tauscher, American agent for large German weapon manufacturers, forced her to resign.

Hans Tauscher met Gadski after attending one of her performances, and they married on November 20, 1892, in Berlin, Germany. They had a daughter, Charlotte Tauscher Busch, who was born in Berlin on August 31, 1893, married Ernest Busch, a German grand nephew of Adolphus Busch on June 12, 1923, (and died there on March 30, 1967).

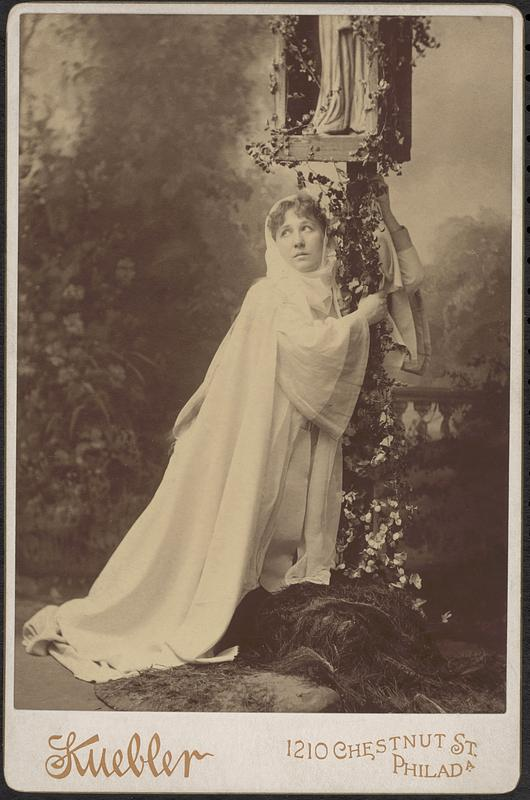
Gadsky in Tannhauser, ca. 1893-1905; from the Cabinet Card Collection of the Boston Public Library

Highlights of her subsequent career in Germany included appearances in Wagner's works at the 1899 Bayreuth Festival and at the 1905/06 Munich Festival. However, it was in English-speaking countries that Gadski built her international reputation as a diva. She made her successful American debut in New York in 1895 with the Damrosch Opera Company and became popular, too, in England. In 1896, she created the role of Hester Prynne in the fully staged premiere of Walter Damrosch's opera The Scarlet Letter in Boston. She sang in London at the Royal Opera House, Covent Garden, in 1899, 1900, 1901 and 1906. Some sources credit her with appearing at England's Worcester Festival but this is an error. Actually, she sang at America's Worcester festivals, held in the American state of Massachusetts during the late 1890s.

Gadski was an extremely popular recitalist and in 1899 and 1900, she embarked on a lengthy concert tour of the United States. She had also joined the star-studded roster of singers at the New York Metropolitan Opera, singing there from 1898 to 1904 and again from 1907 to 1917. Around 1902 she met Mabel Riegelman, a young soprano in San Francisco, and brought Mabel and her sister Ruby Riegelman (who was also her chaperone and accompanist) to Berlin in 1903 as her guest, then settling the two sisters in Stettin to continue their musical studies. In 1911, Gadski and Mabel Riegelman took the SS Kaiser Wilhelm II to New York City, where Gadski arranged for her star pupil Mabel Riegelman to debut as Gretel in Engelbert Humperdinck's Hänsel und Gretel.

The first ways-and-means affair held in the (Woman's Club of El Paso) clubhouse was a performance by Madame Johanna Gadski, singer, and her accompanist, Francis Moore, in December 1916. The net proceeds of $440.00 were used to buy furnishings and equipment for the clubhouse.

During World War I, Hans Tauscher was accused of plotting sabotage against the Welland Canal along with Franz von Papen, Captain Karl Boy-Ed, Constantine Covani, and Franz von Rintelen. He was indicted with Franz von Papen but acquitted by a federal jury.

After the United States entered World War I in 1917, the Metropolitan Opera suspended performances of works from the German repertory. The Met's management gave Gadski the choice to resign or be dismissed from the company due to her German links. At the final performance of the season, on 13 April, she was granted permission to announce her "retirement" rather than be officially dismissed. Legend has it that she was deported from the United States as an enemy alien, but this is not true; she spent the duration of the war living quietly in New York and Lake Spofford, New Hampshire, and did not revisit Germany until 1922.

== Later years and death ==
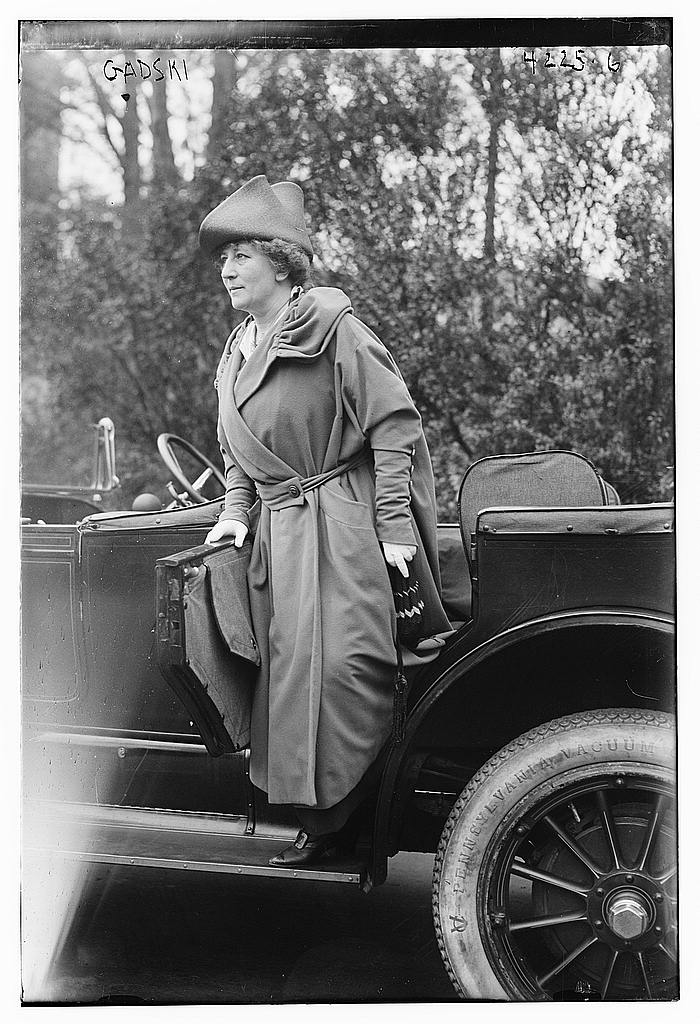
Gadski in 1917

Gadski resumed her professional concert career in the United States in 1921; she did not, however, return to the operatic stage until 1928 when she sang in a production of Die Walküre mounted by the Washington National Opera, a semi-professional company not related to its present namesake.

From 1929 to 1931, she made three tours as the star of her German Grand Opera Company, which produced dozens of performances of Richard Wagner's Der Ring des Nibelungen. By this late date, however, her voice had declined due to advancing age and overwork in her early years.

Gadski was visiting Germany when she was killed in an automobile accident in Berlin on 22 February 1932.

== Legacy ==
During her prime, Gadski was popular on both sides of the Atlantic as a Wagnerian singer, but she also performed Italian operatic roles such as Aida by Verdi. In her prime, she had a voice noted for its ringing high notes and for combining power with agility. Gadski made numerous recordings for the Victor Talking Machine Company in the United States from 1903 to 1917. Her complete Victor recordings have been reissued on compact disc by Marston Records on two multi-disc sets. These sets also contain the Mapleson Cylinders of her voice that were recorded live from the stage of the Metropolitan Opera House during the early years of the 20th century.

== Gallery ==
"Fort denn eile" from Die Walküre, act 3
Victor Records, 1917

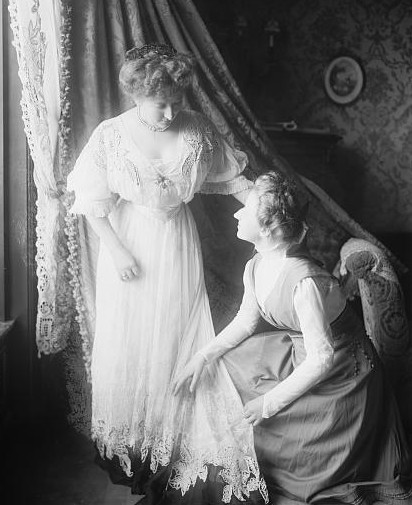
Gadski and daughter, Charlotte Busch, 1909

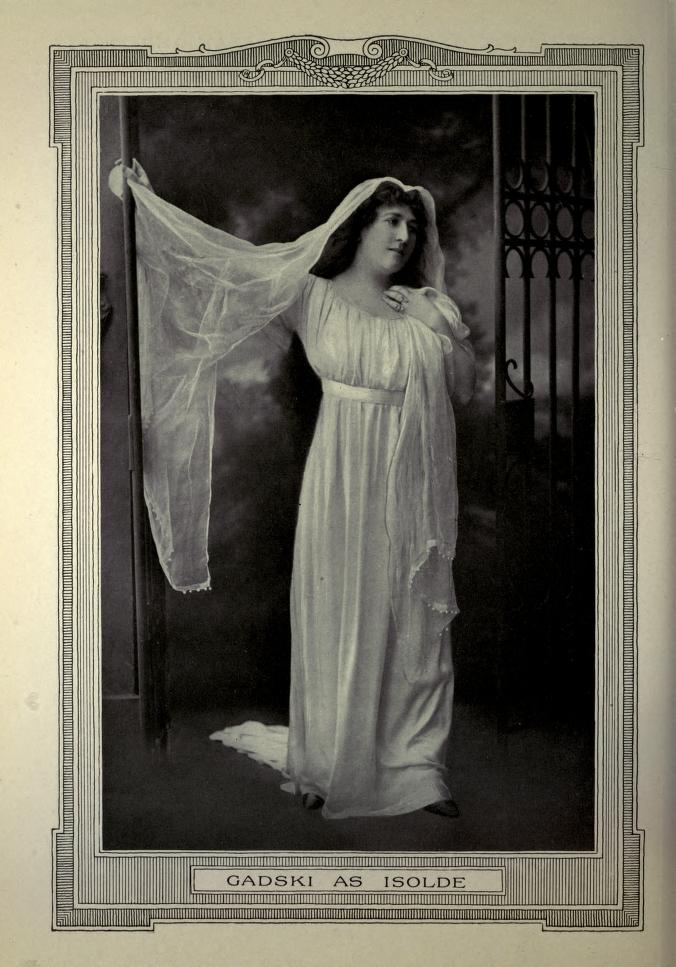
Gadski as Isolde, 1914
