= Florence Easton =

English opera singer (1882–1955)

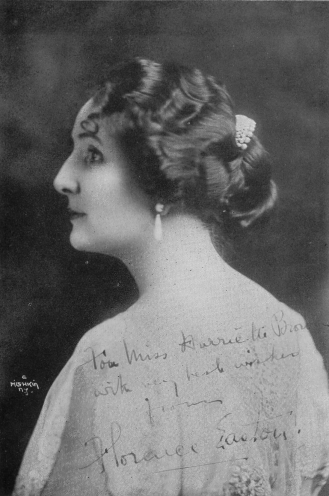
Florence Easton

Florence Easton (25 October 1882 – 13 August 1955) was an English soprano of the early twentieth century. She was a versatile singer, appearing in more than 100 roles, covering a wide range of styles and periods, from Mozart, Meyerbeer, Gounod, Verdi, Wagner, Puccini, Strauss, Schreker and Krenek. She specialized in singing Wagnerian opera parts, from Senta in Der fliegende Holländer to Brünnhilde in Siegfried.

Easton described herself as a "lyric dramatic soprano." Her international reputation, founded mainly in North America and Germany, was unique for a British singer of her time. She could move easily through all stages from the light coloratura to the Hochdramatische, from girlish romanticism to the powerful drama of Wagner and Strauss. The critic John Steane has suggested that "This great strength of hers was also, in a strange way, a source of weakness. She sang so many roles very well that she never quite became identified with any of these." Despite some minor difficulty with Italian diction, she was chosen by Puccini to create Lauretta in his 1917 opera Gianni Schicchi.

== Biography ==
=== Early life ===
Florence Easton as Cio-Cio-San in Madama Butterfly, Metropolitan Opera Company

Florence Easton was the elder daughter of John Thomas Easton and Isabella Yarrow, and niece of Fletcher Easton. Known professionally as 'the nightingale of South Bank,' she was born on 25 October 1882 at 52 Napier Street, South Bank, Middlesbrough. Her parents left England when she was 5 years old and settled with Florence (then known as Flossie) and her younger brother in Toronto, Ontario, Canada. Flossie sang in the choir of Parkdale Methodist Church, where her father was choirmaster and her mother was organist. Her musical talent became evident in early childhood. She appeared publicly as a pianist when she was about 8 years old.

When her mother died in 1899, Easton returned with her father to Middlesbrough, where he joined a partnership in a wholesale fruit merchants business with William Henry Easton, his father and Fletcher Easton, his brother. A collection in Middlesbrough raised enough money for her to study for a year at the Royal Academy of Music in London—she lost the money on her first day in the capital, and her father had to find replacement funds. She started in May 1900 and studied singing for a year. The 1901 Census shows her as an 18-year-old student at the Royal Academy of Music, living at Hendon, Middlesex.

In 1901 she went to Paris to study singing with Elliott Haslam, a friend of her father's. "But not long after this my father died, and my grandparents (who had good old-fashioned ideas that a woman's place to sing was in the home) discouraged my efforts. They even carried paternalism far enough to select a husband for me. When this point had been reached, I quietly disappeared, and once more went back to my vocal work."

=== Professional career ===
Her debut operatic appearance was as the shepherd boy in Tannhäuser at Newcastle upon Tyne in 1903 with the touring Moody-Manners Opera Company. On the first evening of the company's season at Covent Garden she sang Stephano in Roméo et Juliette. Her first leading role at the Covent Garden Opera House was Arline in The Bohemian Girl, and she was a success there in 1903, as the lead in Madama Butterfly.

Easton married twice. In May 1904 she married Francis Maclennan (born 1873, died 1935), an American tenor with the Moody-Manners Opera Company. She made her American debut as Gilda in Rigoletto in Baltimore with Henry W. Savage's English Grand Opera Company in November 1905, and she sang a number of roles with this company in the US and Canada over the next 2 years. In 1905 Maclennan had the title role in Henry W. Savage's Parsifal tour of America, and Easton gave up her singing career to set up home in America. They had a son in 1906 and a daughter (Wilhelmina) in 1912; they divorced in 1928. Wilhelmina died in the flu epidemic of 1919.

Her first notable success in America came in Henry Savage's 1906–07 season as Cio-Cio-San in the premiere of Madama Butterfly (in English). Her performance on 27 October 1906 was the second ever in the US, following that of Elsa Szamosy by only twelve days. Easton held a world record of more than three hundred appearances in Madama Butterfly, her favourite role.

From 1907 to 1913 she and her husband Francis Maclennan were members of the Berlin Royal Opera, singing a variety of roles. She had to learn the role of Marguerite in German within 10 days, and followed up by learning and performing Aida within 48 hours without rehearsal. She was immediately given a five-year contract. They became firm friends of Kaiser Wilhelm. Easton was coached by Richard Strauss for the title role in the English version of his Elektra, at the London premiere at Covent Garden in 1910. After the 1912–13 season the Maclennans joined the Hamburg Opera Stadtische Opera, where she first sang with Enrico Caruso in 1913.

A portrait of Florence Easton taken during her engagement years with the Chicago Opera.

In 1915–16, the couple toured America where Easton appeared in a single performance as Brünnhilde in Siegfried, achieving a great popular and critical success. Due to the First World War it was too risky to return to Germany, so they remained in the United States, becoming members of the Chicago Opera Association where she debuted in Siegfried. She remained with the Chicago Opera for two seasons, becoming one of the best-known Wagnerian sopranos in the United States. In 1917, she made her debut at the Metropolitan Opera in New York as Santuzza in Cavalleria Rusticana. She remained at the Met for 12 seasons, singing 41 parts and nearly 300 performances. While in New York, Easton studied with Anna Eugénie Schoen-René who had studied with Pauline Viardot-García and Manuel García.

It was her performance as the Saint Elisabeth in the staged version of Liszt's Die Legende von der heiligen Elisabeth in 1918 which set her into the first rank of Metropolitan Opera stars.

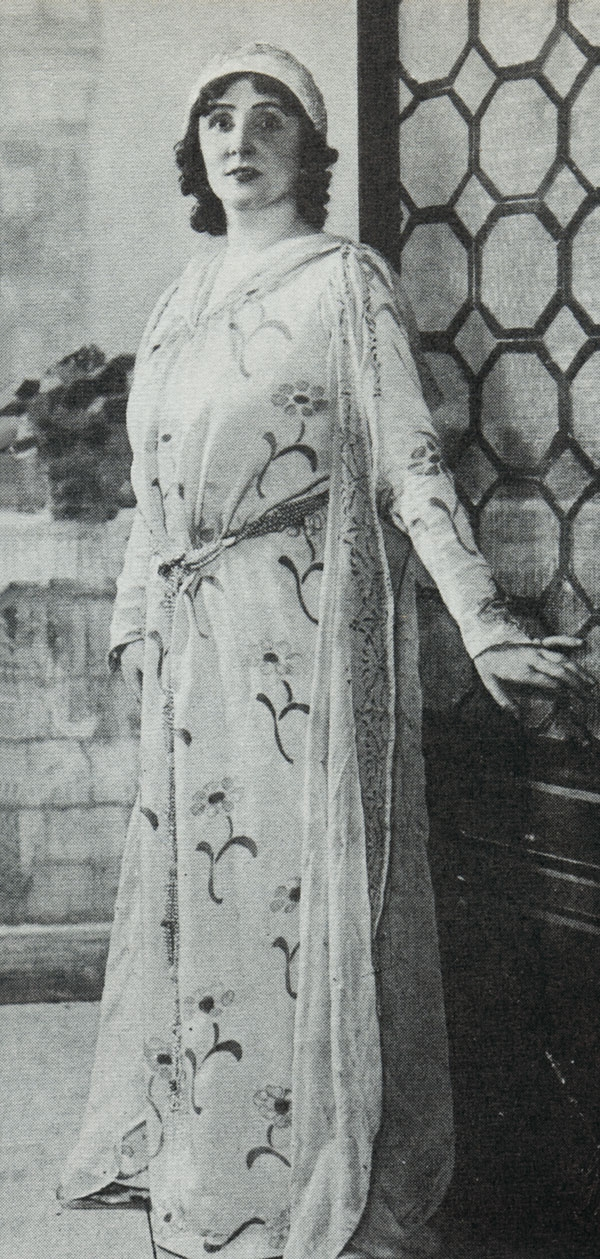
Florence Easton as Lauretta at the world premiere of Gianni Schicchi, 14 December 1918.

Easton created the role of Lauretta at the world premiere of Puccini¹s Gianni Schicchi on 14 December 1918 at the Met; she was the first to sing the now famous aria "O mio babbino caro" ("O My Beloved Papa"). Puccini could not get to New York for the premiere, so the Met's general manager Giulio Gatti-Casazza sent a telegram to Puccini after the performance:

Most happy to announce the complete authentic success of the Trittico. At the end of each opera long very sincere demonstrations more than forty warm curtain calls altogether. In spite of public notice forbidding encores by insistence Lauretta's aria was repeated. Principal strength Moranzoni magnificent. Farrar, Muzio, Easton, De Luca, Montesanto, Didur incomparable singers and actors. Daily press confirms success expressing itself very favourably on worth of the operas enthusiastically for Schicchi.

Easton sang many other premiere roles including Aelfrida in Deems Taylor's The King's Henchman on 17 February 1927 and Mother Tyl in Wolff's L'oiseau bleu. She was also featured in many American premieres including La cena delle beffe, Così fan tutte and Der Rosenkavalier. Her repertoire included more than 100 roles in 4 languages. She appeared with Enrico Caruso at his final performance, on 24 December 1920, in Halevy's La Juive. By 1926, she was earning $800 for each performance of Turandot. In 1929 she sang her last premiere for the Metropolitan, Otto Kahn's staging of the jazz opera Jonny spielt auf. In 1929, she went to Europe for several months enjoying herself on the proceeds from years of singing with only a few short breaks. However, she lost a fortune in the Wall Street crash of 1929.

In the fortnight between 3 and 17 November 1927 she sang Maddalena in Andrea Chénier, La Gioconda, Rachel in La Juive, Madama Butterfly and the Marschallin in Der Rosenkavalier; it was surprising that she could manage them all and in such a relatively short space of time. The critical response to nearly every one was laudatory.

Easton was famous for her ability to take an unknown part at 8 in the morning and perform it flawlessly in public 12 hours later. Frequently she was called upon to substitute for some leading soprano suddenly indisposed. She sang her first Isolde without a single rehearsal, called to do so at the last minute. In the middle of the 1929 season however, her memory suddenly failed her, and she asked to be released from her contract. She announced her retirement from opera and moved to a house in Hampstead, London. She married Robert Stanley Rogers, a New York banker and executive of the Celanese Corporation of America and baritone singer, in 1931.

The following year she returned to singing and recorded Siegfried with Lauritz Melchior at Covent Garden. Between 1932 and 1935 she sang at Covent Garden, Sadler's Wells and at the Promenade Concerts under Sir Henry Wood, with the London Philharmonic under Sir Thomas Beecham and with the BBC Symphony Orchestra in the first worldwide hook-up broadcast. Her regular accompanist was Harold Craxton. At Covent Garden in 1932 she was Isolde in Tristan und Isolde and Brunnhilde in "Siegfried" opposite Lauritz Melchior, the only time they appeared together. She was Tosca, an unlikely Carmen, sang in Mendelssohn's Elijah and gave Lieder and song recitals. Leaving England finally in 1935, she found that she had lost the tour to the new sensation, Kirsten Flagstad (but she remained an unstinting admirer of the great Norwegian). Easton's last appearance on the operatic stage was as Brünnhilde in Die Walküre in New York on 28 February 1936.

In an interview in New York in 1935 she suggested the reason for her absence from the Metropolitan Opera: "It was an accident during a performance of Carmen in England a year ago which incapacitated me for a number of months last year. Reeling in Carmen's death-throes, I happened to catch my heel in the skirt of my dress and fell, twisting my spine, directly in the path of the curtain. The audience hadn't the remotest idea that the apparently lifeless Carmen who lay there was almost lifeless – and indeed, I actually would have been two minutes later if I had not retained sufficient consciousness to edge out of the path of the descending curtain on its way to deposit about a ton of iron weighting on my head. However, all these things must be taken in one's stride".

=== Retirement and final years ===
Florence retired from public performance in 1939; her last appearance with the orchestra was in a 1942 broadcast where she sang excerpts from Tristan und Isolde using her own English translations. She then taught privately and at the Juilliard School of Music, and still gave occasional recitals in New York. Her final appearance was made at New York Town Hall, in a song recital in 1943. At the end of World War II she moved with her husband to Montreal, Quebec, Canada, and they returned to New York in 1950. She was suffering from heart trouble and she died on 13 August 1955, in Montreal, aged 72.

== Recordings ==
Florence Easton made more than 100 records in the 1920s and 1930s. She recorded for Odeon, Aeolian-Vocalion but mostly for Brunswick, initially recording acoustically, but electrically from 1926. She embraced opera, operetta, sacred songs and popular ballads. One of her most important Wagnerian records was made for His Master's Voice in 1932: the superb Siegfried "Brünnhilde" opposite Lauritz Melchior (Covent Garden, 1932) "Heil dir Sonne! Heil dir Licht!" (the best recording in her own estimation). She recorded six operatic items for Edison (1927), but only two were issued; and in 1933, His Master's Voice recorded six sides of Lieder and songs for RCA Victor, accompanied by Gerald Moore.

=== Partial discography ===
- Recital 1921–1942 (Arias and songs by Wagner, Verdi, Bizet, Gounod, Rimsky-Korsakov, Puccini, Haydn, Wolf, Dvořák, Brahms, R. Strauss, Schumann. Popular American and German songs)
- Claremont – Florence Easton; Absolute Soprano (Recordings 1918-1933/1939/1940)
- Brunswick (original company, re-issued widely for example Marston & Symposum: Gianni Schicchi (Puccini) O mio babbino caro (Creator recording which though beautifully sung exhibits one of the worst Italian accents of any major singer on record).
- Marston – Wagner, Der Ring des Nibelungen (The "Potted Ring") Pearl – Lauritz Melchior Edition Vol. 5
- Off-air recordings include two Götterdämmerung extracts from a Lewisohn Stadium concert and 14 items (mainly Lieder) from a recital at the Juilliard School of Music (13 July 1939) – International Record Collectors Club (IRCC).
- Three Tristan excerpts (two with Arthur Carron plus the Liebestod) followed from the Celanese Hour broadcast (1942). According to the label of IRCC 3004, the love duet and liebestod were both sung in Easton's own English translation.
- RCA Victor 1705 – "My Laddie" – an enchanting "Scotch love song" – with words by US novelist Princess Amélie Rives Troubetzkoy and music by William Armour Thayer, a Brooklyn organist. Apparently issued in 1933.

There are two less well-known recordings, made by Brunswick in the 1920s when she was in her absolute prime:

- Laisse-moi... O nuit d’amour! with Mario Chamlee (Marguerite in Gounod's Faust Brunswick 1927)
- Parigi o cara with Mario Chamlee (Violetta in Verdi's La traviata Brunswick 1927)
- A compilation 2-CD set was released in 1997 by Claremont in South Africa (GSE 78-50-72/73) from original shellac discs.
