= Arthur Guiterman =

United States writer (1871–1943)

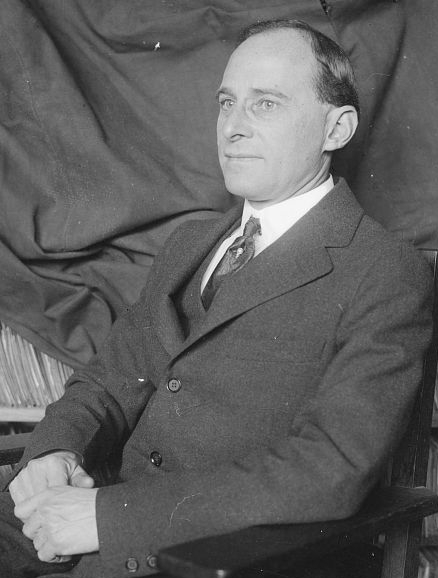
Arthur Guiterman

Arthur Guiterman (/ˈɡɪtərmən/; November 20, 1871 Vienna – January 11, 1943 New York) was an American writer best known for his humorous poems.

== Life and career ==
Guiterman was born of American parents in Vienna. His father was Alexander Gütermann, born in the Bavarian village Redwitz an der Rodach, and his mother was Louisa Wolf, born in Cincinnati. Arthur graduated from the City College of New York in 1891, and later was married in 1909 to Vida Lindo. He was an editor of the Woman's Home Companion and the Literary Digest. In 1910, he cofounded the Poetry Society of America, and later served as its president in 1925–26.

One poem about modern progress, with rhyming couplets such as "First dentistry was painless;/Then bicycles were chainless", ends:

New motor roads are dustless,
The latest steel is rustless,
Our tennis courts are sodless,
Our new religions—godless.

Another Guiterman poem is "On the Vanity of Earthly Greatness":

The tusks which clashed in mighty brawls
Of mastodons, are billiard balls.
The sword of Charlemagne the Just
Is Ferric Oxide, known as rust.
The grizzly bear, whose potent hug
Was feared by all, is now a rug.
Great Caesar's bust is on the shelf,
And I don't feel so well myself.

His 1936 "D.A.R.ling" satire is about the Daughters of the American Revolution and three other clubs open only to descendants of pre-Independence British Americans.

The D.A.R.lings
chatter like starlings
telling their ancestors' names,
while grimly aloof,
with looks of reproof,
sit the Colonial Dames. (Note: Both the Colonial Dames of America and the National Society of the Colonial Dames of America.)
The Cincinnati,
merry and chatty,
dangle their badges and pendants;
but haughty and proud,
disdaining the crowd,
brood the Mayflower descendants.

He also notably wrote the libretto for Walter Damrosch's The Man Without a Country which premiered at the Metropolitan Opera in New York City on May 12, 1937.

== Bibliography ==
=== Poetry ===
Collections

- Guiterman, Arthur (1907). Betel nuts: What they say in Hindustan. San Francisco: P. Elder.
- — (1915). The laughing muse. New York: Harper and Brothers.
- — (1918). The mirthful lyre. New York: Harper and Brothers.
- — (1920). Chips of jade. New York: E.P. Dutton.
- — (1920). Ballads of old New York. New York: Harper and Brothers.
- — (1921). A ballad-maker's pack. New York: Harper and Brothers.
- — (1923). The light guitar. New York: Harper and Brothers.
- — (1924). A poet's proverbs. New York: E.P. Dutton.
- — (1927). Wildwood fables. New York: E.P. Dutton.
- — (1929). Song and laughter. New York: E.P. Dutton.
- — (1935). Death and General Putnam and 101 other poems. New York: E.P. Dutton.
- — (1936). Gaily the troubadour. New York: E.P. Dutton.
- — (1939). Lyric laughter. New York: E.P. Dutton.
- — (1943). Brave laughter. New York: E.P. Dutton.

List of poems

Title	Year	First published	Reprinted/collected
Indifference	1925	Guiterman, Arthur (May 9, 1925). "Indifference". The New Yorker. Vol. 1, no. 12. p. 27.	
I've never found that being clever	1925	Guiterman, Arthur (April 25, 1925). "I've never found that being clever". The New Yorker. Vol. 1, no. 10. p. 18.	
Lyrics from the Pekinese (I–III)	1925	Guiterman, Arthur (February 21, 1925). "Lyrics from the Pekinese (I-III)". The New Yorker. Vol. 1, no. 1. p. 21.	
Lyrics from the Pekinese (IV-VI)	1925	Guiterman, Arthur (February 28, 1925). "Lyrics from the Pekinese (IV–VI)". The New Yorker. Vol. 1, no. 2. p. 18.	
Lyrics from the Pekinese (VII–IX)	1925	Guiterman, Arthur (March 7, 1925). "Lyrics from the Pekinese (VII–IX)". The New Yorker. Vol. 1, no. 3. p. 21.	
Lyrics from the Pekinese (X–XII)	1925	Guiterman, Arthur (March 14, 1925). "Lyrics from the Pekinese (X–XII)". The New Yorker. Vol. 1, no. 4. p. 20.	
Lyrics from the Pekinese (XIII–XV)	1925	Guiterman, Arthur (March 21, 1925). "Lyrics from the Pekinese (XIII–XV)". The New Yorker. Vol. 1, no. 5. p. 17.	
Lyrics from the Pekinese (XVI–XVIII)	1925	Guiterman, Arthur (March 28, 1925). "Lyrics from the Pekinese (XVI–XVIII)". The New Yorker. Vol. 1, no. 6. p. 18.	
Lyrics from the Pekinese (XIX–XXI)	1925	Guiterman, Arthur (April 4, 1925). "Lyrics from the Pekinese (XIX–XXI)". The New Yorker. Vol. 1, no. 7. p. 18.	
Lyrics from the Pekinese (XXII–XXIV)	1925	Guiterman, Arthur (April 11, 1925). "Lyrics from the Pekinese (XXII–XXIV)". The New Yorker. Vol. 1, no. 8. p. 12.	
Lyrics from the Pekinese (XXV–XXVII)	1925	Guiterman, Arthur (April 25, 1925). "Lyrics from the Pekinese (XXV–XXVII)". The New Yorker. Vol. 1, no. 10. p. 14.	
Lyrics from the Pekinese (XXVIII–XXX)	1925	Guiterman, Arthur (May 2, 1925). "Lyrics from the Pekinese (XXVII–XXX) [sic]". The New Yorker. Vol. 1, no. 11. p. 14.	
Lyrics from the Pekinese (XXXI–XXXIII)	1925	Guiterman, Arthur (June 13, 1925). "Lyrics from the Pekinese (XXXI–XXXIII)". The New Yorker. Vol. 1, no. 17. p. 10.	
Religion	1925	Guiterman, Arthur (June 13, 1925). "Religion". The New Yorker. Vol. 1, no. 17. p. 14.	
Rendezvous	1925	Guiterman, Arthur (March 28, 1925). "Rendezvous". The New Yorker. Vol. 1, no. 6. p. 8.	

Translations

- Bonsels, Waldemar (1929). The adventures of Maya the bee. Illustrated by Vera Bock; translated by Adele Szold Seltzer and Arthur Guiterman. New York: Boni.
