= Hans Tauscher =

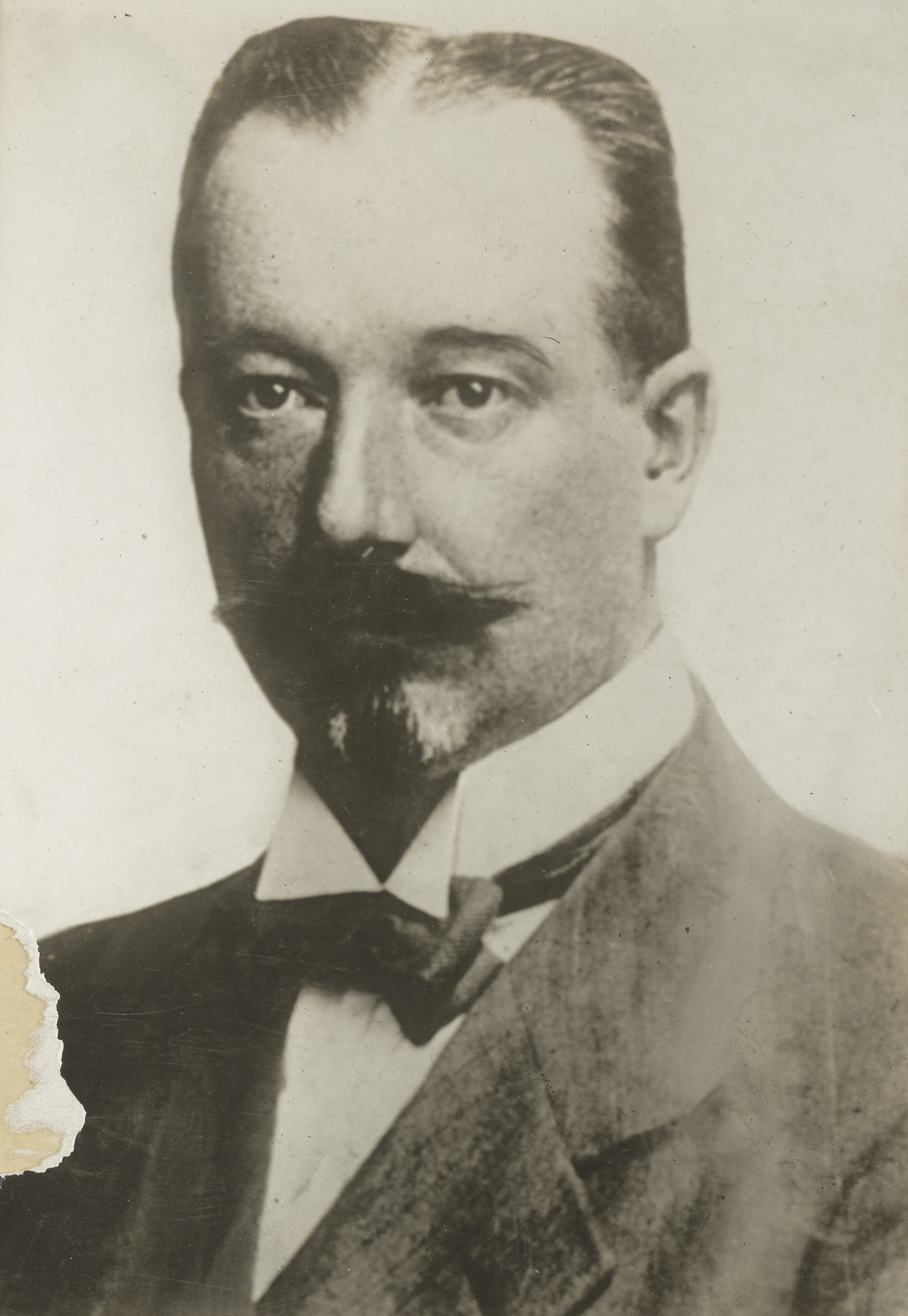
- Born: October 29, 1867; Prenzlau, Germany
- Died: September 5, 1941 (aged 73); Manhattan, New York City

Hans Tauscher (October 29, 1867 – September 5, 1941) was an officer of the Imperial German Army during World War I who was accused in the United States of plotting sabotage against Canada's Welland Canal. He was indicted with Franz von Papen but acquitted by a federal jury. From the late 1890s until 1931, he was the American representative for Krupp in the United States.

== Biography ==
He was born in Prenzlau, Germany, on October 29, 1867, to Traugott Johannes Tauscher (1838–1916), German military officer and Pauline Hillmann (1837–1925). He attended a military academy and was appointed as a lieutenant in the Imperial German Army by 1891. He attended an opera and met Johanna Gadski, and they married on November 20, 1892, in Berlin, Germany. They had a daughter, Charlotte, who was born in Berlin on August 31, 1893 (and died there on March 30, 1967).

Tauscher "put the Luger pistol on the map in the Americas at the turn of the 20th century."

During World War I he was accused of plotting sabotage against the Welland Canal along with Franz von Papen, Captain Karl Boy-Ed, Constantine Covani, and Franz von Rintelen. He was indicted with Franz von Papen but acquitted by a federal jury.

He died on September 5, 1941, at St. Clare's Hospital in Manhattan, New York City.
