= Elsa Raccanelli =

Chilean opera singer and soprano

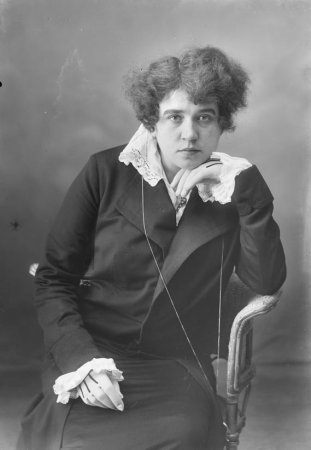

Background information
- Born: 19th Century
- Died: 20th Century
- Occupation: Opera singer
- Instrument: Voice

Elsa Raccanelli (19th Century – 20th Century) was a Chilean opera singer and soprano active in Spain and Italy.

In 1907, Raccanelli played Laura in Iolanta at the Teatro Comunale di Bologna. In 1912, Raccanelli played the lead role in the revival of Tzigana at the Politeama Genovese. During the 1914–1915 and the 1915–1916 seasons Raccanelli performed at the Gran Teatre del Liceu. Raccanelli performed at the Teatro Real and the Teatro Donizetti during the 1919–1920 season.
