= L'oracolo =

1905 opera by Franco Leoni

L'oracolo is a one act opera by Franco Leoni to a libretto by Camillo Zanoni based on the drama "The Cat and the Cherub" by Chester Bailey Fernald set in Chinatown, San Francisco. The London premiere at Covent Garden in 1905 was conducted by André Messager with baritone Antonio Scotti in the role of the villain, opium den owner Cim-Fen. The opera was performed frequently at the Metropolitan Opera in the 1920 and 1930s.

== Recordings ==
- Joan Sutherland, Tito Gobbi cond. Richard Bonynge 1975
- Annalisa Raspagliosi (Ah-Joe), Carlo Ventre (San-Lui), Ashley Holland (Old Wise Man), Peter Sidhom (Cim-Fen), Franz Mayer (Hu-Tsin), Katharina Magiera (Hua-Qui), Pere Llompart, Lars Rößler, Ricardo Iturra & Pavel Smirnov (Opium Addicts/Salesmen) with chorus of the Frankfurt Opera Frankfurt Opera Children's Chorus, cond. Stefan Solyom Oehms. 1CD
