= John Gurney (bass-baritone) =

American opera singer (1902–1997)

- Born: June 13, 1902; Jamestown, New York, U.S.
- Died: August 6, 1997 (aged 95); Newport Beach, California, U.S.
- Education: Oberlin Conservatory of Music; Harvard Business School
- Occupation: Operatic bass-baritone
- Organizations: Metropolitan Opera

John R. Gurney (June 13, 1902 — August 6, 1997) was an American bass-baritone who had an active career as an opera, concert, vaudeville, and musical theatre performer from the 1920s through the 1940s. He was a principal artist at the Metropolitan Opera from 1936 through 1945 where he performed a total of 331 times. On the international stage he performed in operas at the Teatro Colón in Buenos Aires and the Theatro Municipal in Rio de Janeiro. He is best remembered for creating roles in the world premieres of Walter Damrosch's The Man Without a Country (1937, Colonel Morgan) and Douglas Moore's The Devil and Daniel Webster (1939, Jabez Stone). He recorded the role of Don Basilio in Rossini's The Barber of Seville which was released by RCA Camden in 1957. Gurney's son was the racecar driver Dan Gurney (also deceased).

== Biography and career ==
Born in Jamestown, New York, Gurney was the son of F.W. Gurney; the founder and industrialist of the Gurney Elevator Company. He graduated from Oberlin College's Conservatory of Music in 1924 and then earned an M.A. from the Harvard Business School before pursuing music studies in Paris with Jean Mauran in the 1920s. At Oberlin he performed in the Oberlin College Quartet, and at Harvard University he was a member of the Harvard Glee Club (HGC). He was mentored by the HGC's director, Archibald Thompson Davison, who encouraged him to pursue a career in opera.

Gurney first performed in the United States with the touring American Opera Company in productions of Puccini's Madama Butterfly and Gounod's Faust in 1928. In 1930 he starred in the musical revue Aladdin and Gilbert and Sullivan's H.M.S. Pinafore at the Roxy Theatre. He made his Broadway debut as a member of the ensemble in the Ziegfeld Follies of 1931. That same year he became a member of the National Music League. In 1932 he toured in vaudeville in concerts with pianist Mike Bernard, and also toured the United States in the Roxy Theatre's "Roxy Gang".

In the mid 1930s, Gurney provided the voices for various characters in the Rainbow Parade animated cartoon shorts (including some Felix the Cat and Molly Moo-Cow shorts), singing a musical number in each one.

Gurney made his debut at the Metropolitan Opera (Met) in New York City on May 13, 1936, as Sparafucile in Verdi's Rigoletto with Carlo Morelli in the title role and Gennaro Papi conducting. At the Met he portrayed the roles of Pietro and Giotto in the United States premiere of Richard Hageman's Caponsacchi on February 4, 1937; and in 1937 he created the role of Colonel Morgan in the world premiere of Damrosch's The Man Without a Country. Other roles he performed on the Met stage included Abimélech in Saint-Saëns's Samson and Delilah (1936, 1937), Ahmad in Henri Rabaud's Mârouf (1937), Antonio and Jarno in Thomas's Mignon (1938—1945), Cappadocian in Strauss's Salome (1938), Ferrando in Verdi's Il trovatore (1937—1943), King Heinrich in Wagner's Lohengrin (1938), Nikitich in Mussorgsky's Boris Godunov (1939), Pinellino in Puccini's Gianni Schicchi (1938), the Ragpicker in Charpentier's Louise, Ramfis in Verdi's Aida (1936—1945), Schwarz in Wagner's Die Meistersinger von Nürnberg (1937—1945), and Tobias in Smetana's The Bartered Bride (1936–1942).

In 1939 Gurney created the Faust-like role of Jabez Stone in the world premiere of Moore's The Devil and Daniel Webster at Broadway's Martin Beck Theatre on May 18, 1939. Directed by John Houseman and conducted by Fritz Reiner, it was the first opera presented by the American Lyric Theatre. In 1940 he was the soloist in Bach's Mass in B minor with the Oratorio Society of New York and conductor Albert Stoessel at Carnegie Hall. In 1942 he was committed to the Teatro Colón in Argentina and the Theatro Municipal in Rio de Janeiro performing many of the roles he sang at the Met. In 1944 he performed the title role in Mendelssohn's Elijah at The Town Hall.

By 1940, Gurney was living in Douglaston, Queens – and he soon thereafter purchased a property in nearby Flower Hill, New York.

Gurney portrayed Captain Dick Warrington in Herbert's Naughty Marietta at the Grand Rapids Municipal Opera in 1944 with Marita Farell portraying the title role. That same year he performed the role of the Sheriff of Nottingham in De Koven's Robin Hood with the Civic Light Opera Association of Detroit. He starred in Herbert's The Fortune Teller and Rudolf Friml's The Three Musketeers with Patricia Bowman at The Municipal Opera Association of St. Louis in the summer of 1945. That same year Gurney performed the title role in Verdi's Rigoletto with the Charles Wagner Opera Company which began its national tour in November 1945 at the Birmingham Municipal Auditorium.

In 1946 Gurney toured with Fortune Gallo's San Carlo Opera Company; performing in Rigoletto, Aida, La bohème, and Faust. He portrayed Devilshoof in Balfe's The Bohemian Girl in 1946 and the De Koven's Sheriff of Nottingham in 1947 with the Memphis Open Air Theatre.

=== Later life and death ===
Gurney retired from the stage in 1947 and then moved to California where he resided first in Riverside and then Corona del Mar, Newport Beach. In 1961 he came out of retirement briefly to portray Pimen in Boris Godunov with the Phoenix Grand Opera. In the latter part of his life he worked as a furniture designer and builder, and as a portrait artist. He was married to Roma Gurney (née Sexton), with whom he had two children. They are the parents of Dan Gurney, the famous racing driver and builder of race cars. On several occasions Gurney sang "The Star-Spangled Banner" for the opening of major racing events in his son's career.

Gurney died at the age of 95 on August 6, 1997, in Newport Beach, California.
