= Otto Lohse =

German conductor and composer

Otto Lohse (21 September 1859 – 5 May 1925) was a German conductor and composer.

== Biography ==
Born in Dresden, Saxony, Lohse studied with Hans Richter and Felix Draeseke at the Dresden Conservatory. In 1882, he became conductor of two music societies in Riga, the Wagner Society and the Imperial Russian Music Society. Seven years later, he became the first kapellmeister of the city's Stadttheater. In September 1893, he became second Kapellmeister at the Hamburg Stadttheater (director and first Kapellmeister was Gustav Mahler).

During his two nine-month seasons at the Hamburg Theater, Lohse conducted a total of 343 performances of 42 different operas. In March 1895, while in Hamburg, he married soprano Katharina Klafsky. The couple traveled to the United States in the summer of 1896 to join the Damrosch Opera Company, breaching their contract with the Hamburg Opera. They returned to Germany a year later.

From then on, Lohse held important conductorial posts at Strasbourg (1897–1904), Riga Stadttheater (1899–1900), Cologne (1903–11), the Théâtre de la Monnaie (1911–12), and the Stadttheater in Leipzig (1912–23). He also directed performances of Richard Wagner's music dramas at Covent Garden, London, from 1901 until 1904. Lohse received the honorary title of Royal Professor in 1916. His only opera, Der Prinz wider Willen, was performed in Riga in 1890.

== Death ==
Lohse died in Baden-Baden in 1925.
