= Elizabeth Amsden =

American actress

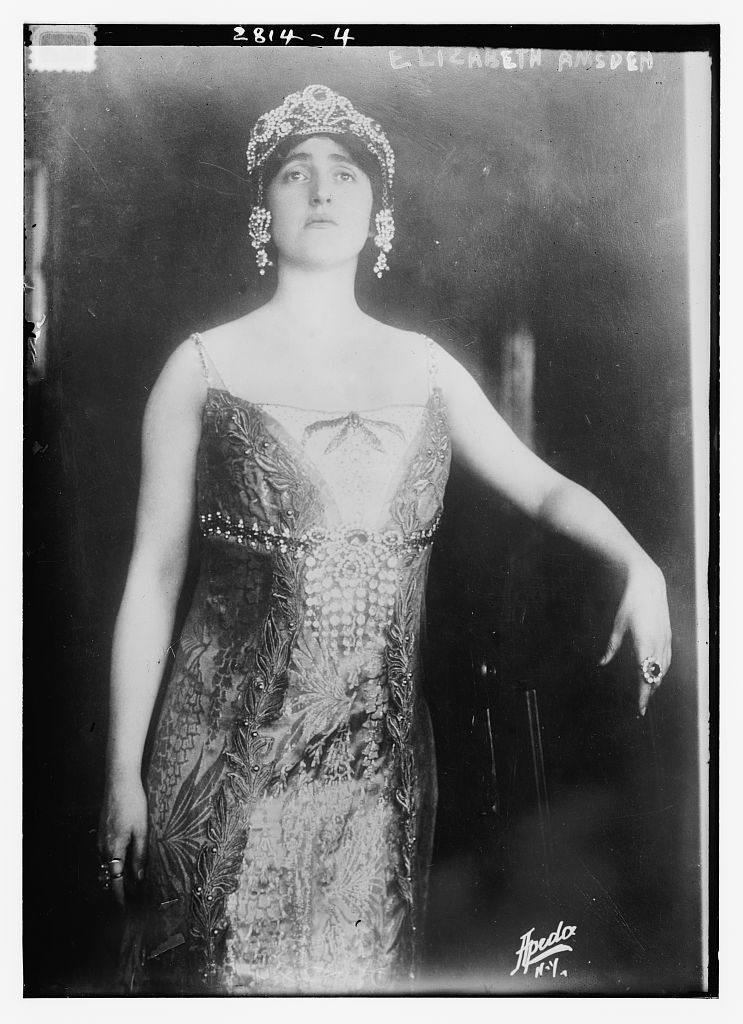
Elizabeth Amsden

Elizabeth Amsden (March 27, 1881, Boston – July 20, 1966, Sugar Hill, New Hampshire) was an American operatic soprano. She had an active international opera career during the early 20th century.

== Life and career ==
Amsden was born in Boston, Massachusetts on October 9, 1881. During her school days her family moved to Providence, Rhode Island, where she was educated at the Elmhurst School. In 1892, while still in her youth, she entered the International School for singers in Boston where she studied under William Whitney. She then attended and graduated from the New England Conservatory of Music.

After completing her education in the United States, Amsden went to Paris where she remained for six years before relocating to London. While biographical sources credited her professional opera debut at London's Royal Opera House in 1910, she had been active earlier than this on the London stage. A year earlier, on June 22, 1909, she had performed the role of Avis in the United Kingdom premiere of Ethel Smyth's The Wreckers at His Majesty's Theatre. She was committed to the Royal Opera House, Covent Garden in 1910-1911 where she notably portrayed Toinette in the United Kingdom premiere of Xavier Leroux's Le Chemineau. Other roles she performed at Covent Garden included Countess Almaviva in The Marriage of Figaro, Helmwige in Die Walküre, and Gutrune in Götterdämmerung.

Following engagements in Nice and Brussels, she became a member of the Boston Opera Company in 1911. She made her debut in Boston in January 1912 in the title role of Giuseppe Verdi's Aida. Her other roles with the Boston Opera Company included Donna Elvira in Don Giovanni, Giulietta in The Tales of Hoffmann, La Regina in Germania, Leonora in Il trovatore, Marguerite in Faust, Minnie in La fanciulla del West, and Santuzza in Cavalleria rusticana.

In 1913 Amsden performed the roles of Maliella in Ermanno Wolf-Ferrari's The Jewels of the Madonna and Verdi's Aida at the Century Opera House in New York. In 1916 she portrayed the title role in Puccini's Tosca with the Chicago Opera Association. In 1922 she was engaged for the third season of the Cincinnati Opera with whom she performed the role of Margherita in Boito's Mefistofele. She also toured the United States with the San Carlo Opera Company for several years during her career; appearing in roles like Aida (1918), Amelia in Un ballo in maschera (1921), and the title role in Il segreto di Susanna (1923). On the international stage she appeared in operas at the Paris Opera and La Scala among other companies.

Amsden married French-Canadian baritone Joseph Royer in Quebec in 1918. Their marriage ended in divorce in 1926. She later married Gabriel Chaminadas who survived her upon her death in 1966.
