= Joseph Royer =

Canadian operatic baritone

Joseph Royer (1884, Quebec City – August 10, 1965, Phoenix, Arizona) was a Canadian operatic baritone.

== Life and career ==
Born in Quebec City, Royer moved with his family to the United States as a child and spent his youth in Berlin, New Hampshire. After working as a church musician in his hometown, he moved to New York City to study singing with Victor Maurel. He made his professional opera debut with the Aborn Opera Company as Atahanael in Massenet's Thais. In 1912 he portrayed Raminagrobis in the world premiere of Jules Massenet's Panurge at the Théâtre de la Gaîté in Paris. In 1920 he performed the role of Michele in Covent Garden's first production of Puccini's Il tabarro. That same year he portrayed Pistola in Verdi's Falstaff at La Monnaie and Jack Rance in Puccini's La fanciulla del West at La Fenice.

Royer was a regular performer with the San Carlo Opera Company from 1916 to 1934. During the 1920s he toured with light opera companies in Asia, South America, and South Africa. On 16 May 1936, he made his debut at the Metropolitan Opera as Escamillo in Bizet's Carmen. He performed several more roles at the Met in 1936–37, including Alfio in Cavalleria Rusticana, Amonasro in Aida, and Aaron Burr in the world premiere of Walter Damrosch's The Man Without a Country. He also performed with opera companies in Chicago, Cincinnati, Philadelphia, and St Louis.

After retiring in 1945, Royer resided in Phoenix, Arizona, with his second wife, soprano Rosa Tentoni. His first marriage to soprano Elizabeth Amsden had ended previously in divorce. He died in Phoenix at the age of 81.
