= Arthur Carron =

British opera singer

- Born: Arthur Cox; 12 December 1900; Swindon
- Died: 10 May 1967 (aged 66)
- Occupation: Opera singer (heldentenor)
- Years active: 1929–1952
- Children: 2

Arthur Carron (12 December 1900 – 10 May 1967) was an English operatic heldentenor.

Carron was born in Swindon, United Kingdom. In his early career, he was also known as Arthur Cox which was and remained his given legal name.

== Career ==
Arthur Carron studied under Florence Easton and made his operatic debut at the Old Vic as Tannhäuser in 1929. In 1931 he became the Old Vic company's leading tenor when it moved to Sadler's Wells Theatre. His roles at Sadler's Wells included Fra Diavolo, Manrico of Il trovatore, Radames of Aida, Cavaradossi of Tosca, and Otello. In 1936 he made his Metropolitan Opera debut as Canio in Pagliacci. He remained at the Metropolitan until 1946, creating the role of Nolan in Damrosch's The Man Without a Country in 1937. Other roles there included Siegmund of Die Walküre, Tristan of Tristan und Isolde, Florestan of Fidelio, and Herod of Salome. The last six years of his career were spent at Covent Garden where he retired from in 1952.

He was also a founding member of the Swindon Amateur Light Operatic Society in 1952 and was the producer of their first production The Arcadians at The Empire Theatre in Swindon the same year. He did not appear on stage himself but was involved backstage and held the auditions at his house in Bath Road.

== Commemoration ==
In November 2022 a blue plaque to Arthur Carron was installed on his home 79 Bath Road Swindon by Swindon Heritage and unveiled by his son Byron.
