= The Scarlet Letter (Damrosch opera) =

1895 opera by Walter Damrosch

- Opera by Walter Damrosch
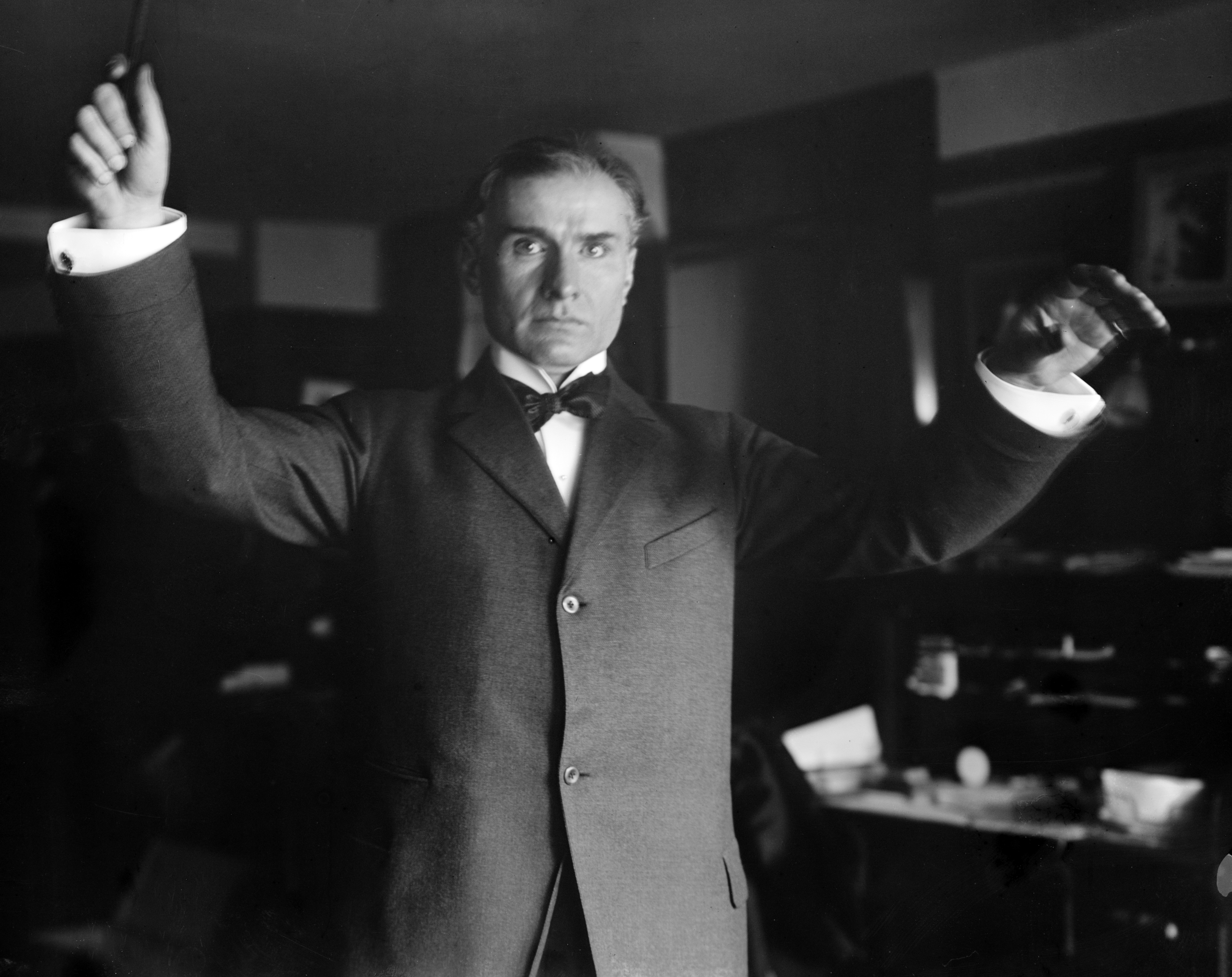
- Walter Damrosch, composer of The Scarlet Letter
- Librettist: George Parsons Lathrop
- Language: English
- Based on: "The Scarlet Letter" by Nathaniel Hawthorne
- Premiere: 10 February 1896; Damrosch Opera Company, The Boston Theatre, Boston, Massachusetts

The Scarlet Letter is an opera by Walter Damrosch, based on Nathaniel Hawthorne's 1850 novel of the same name. The libretto was by George Parsons Lathrop, the son-in-law of Hawthorne. The work is Wagnerian in style, Damrosch being a great enthusiast and champion of the composer.

Excerpts from the opera first premiered at Carnegie Hall on January 4 and 5, 1895; the first fully staged performance was by the composer's own Damrosch Opera Company February 10, 1896, at The Boston Theatre in Boston, Massachusetts. Among those present at the premiere were Charles Eliot Norton, Prince Serge Wolkonsky, Julia Ward Howe, and Nellie Melba. The opera was performed later that year at the Metropolitan Opera House at 39th Street in New York–but was not performed by the company of the Metropolitan Opera.

== Critical response ==
Freund's Musical Weekly was unimpressed by the concert version of the unfished work performed at Carnegie Hall on January 4, 1895. While Lathrop's libretto was praised as "cleverly handled and most intelligently written," Damrosch's score lacked "flow of melody" and "rel[ied] totally on orchestral effects." In contrast, The Outlook, a leading American weekly, praised it as "distinctively and essentially American," with "charming and simple melody."

The Vocalist, a New York magazine, called the finished opera "a creditable production" that was "a success in every way," hailing Damrosch's "genius."

A detailed review of the score by the critic Alfred Remy—also German-born, like Damrosch—faulted the composer for repeatedly quoting Wagner, The Scarlet Letter containing passages from Die Walküre, "Siegfried 's Funeral March" from Götterdämmerung, Tristan und Isolde, and Albumblatt. Remy praised the libretto but described the score harshly—among Remy's words are "monotony," "impossible," "dreary," "clumsy," "unpardonable," "noisy," and "meaningless"—summarizing the opera as a "worthless imitation of Wagner" that displays a "surprising ignorance of the technique of composition."

The critic for London 's The Theatre magazine called Damrosch "a sorry imitator of Wagner," his opera lacking melody even if the orchestration was "technically perfect." Johanna Gadski and Baron Berthald, Hester Prynne and Arthur Dimmesdale in the original production, reprised the roles in New York.

== Roles ==
Role	Voice type	Concert premiere cast, January 4–5, 1895 (the composer conducting)	Full premiere cast, February 10, 1896 (the composer conducting)
Hester Prynne, a young Puritan woman	soprano	Lillian Nordica	Johanna Gadski
Rev. Arthur Dimmesdale, an eloquent young minister	tenor	William H. Rieger	Barron Berthold
Roger Chillingworth, Hester's husband	baritone	Giuseppe Campanari	Wilhelm Merten
Rev. John Wilson, an elderly and revered minister	baritone	Ericsson F. Bushnell	Gerhard Stehman
Governor Bellingham, governor of Boston	bass	Conrad Behrens	Conrad Behrens
Brackett, a jailer	bass	James F. Thomson	Julius von Putlitz
A Shipmaster	baritone	presumably Ericsson F. Bushnell	Gerhard Stehmann
Chorus: Puritans

== Differences from the novel ==
- Pearl, Hester's daughter, is absent.
- Instead of living a solitary life after Dimmesdale dies at the end, Hester takes poison and dies with him.
