= Katharina Klafsky =

Hungarian operatic soprano (1855–1896)

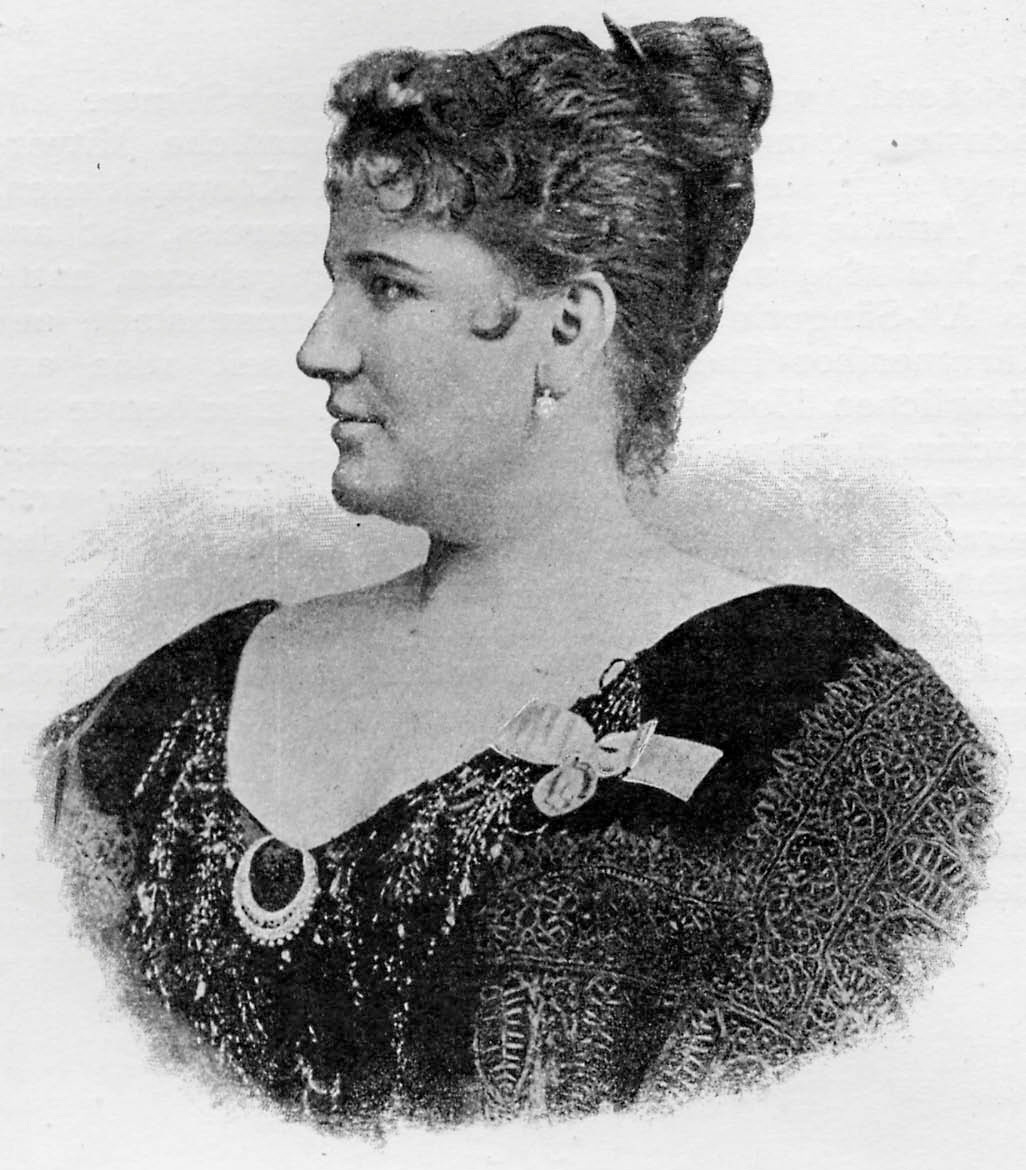
- Born: 19 September 1855; Szent-János, Wieselburg, Kingdom of Hungary
- Died: 22 September 1896 (aged 41); Hamburg, German Empire
- Occupation: Opera singer
- Spouse: Otto Lohse

Katharina Klafsky (19 September 1855 – 22 September 1896) was a Hungarian operatic dramatic soprano whose acclaimed international career was cut short by a chronic illness which proved fatal.

Klafsky was born at Szent-János, Wieselburg, of humble parents. Being employed at Vienna as a nursemaid, her fine soprano voice led to her being engaged as a chorus singer, and she was given lessons in music. By 1882, she became well known in Wagnerian roles at the Leipzig theatre, and she increased her reputation by appearing at other German musical centres.

In 1892, she appeared in London, and had a great success in Wagner's operas, notably as Brünnhilde and as Isolde, her dramatic as well as vocal gifts being of an exceptional order. She sang with the Damrosch Opera Company in America in 1895, but died of brain cancer in 1896.

Klafsky was married to the conductor Otto Lohse.
