= Mapleson Cylinders =

Cylinders used to record live opera in the early 1900s

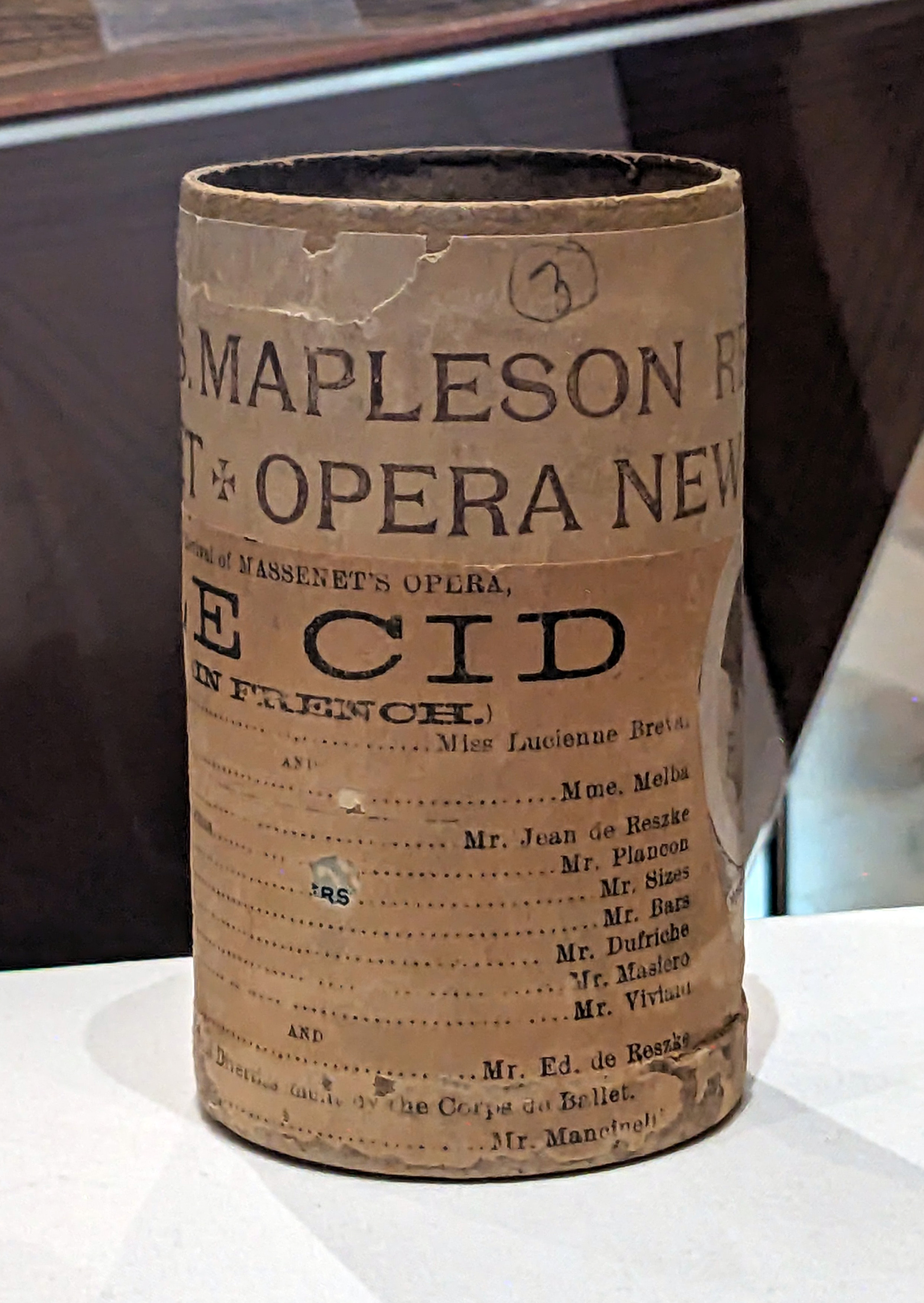
Cover of a Mapleson cylinder from a performance of Massenet's Le Cid, January 19, 1901

The Mapleson Cylinders are a group of about 140 phonograph cylinders recorded live at the Metropolitan Opera House, primarily between 1901 and 1903, by the Met librarian Lionel Mapleson (a nephew of impresario James Henry Mapleson).

The cylinders contain short fragments of actual operatic performances from the Italian, German and French repertoires. Despite their variable quality of sound (some are quite good while others are nearly inaudible), the cylinders have great historical value thanks to the unique aural picture they document of pre-World War I singers in performance at an opera house with a full orchestra. Other contemporary recordings only capture singers as recorded with piano or a severely truncated orchestra in a boxy commercial recording studio. The Mapleson cylinders also feature the only recordings known to exist of a number of famous singers and conductors who were never recorded commercially. They include legendary tenor Jean de Reszke, soprano Milka Ternina, and conductor Luigi Mancinelli.

== History ==
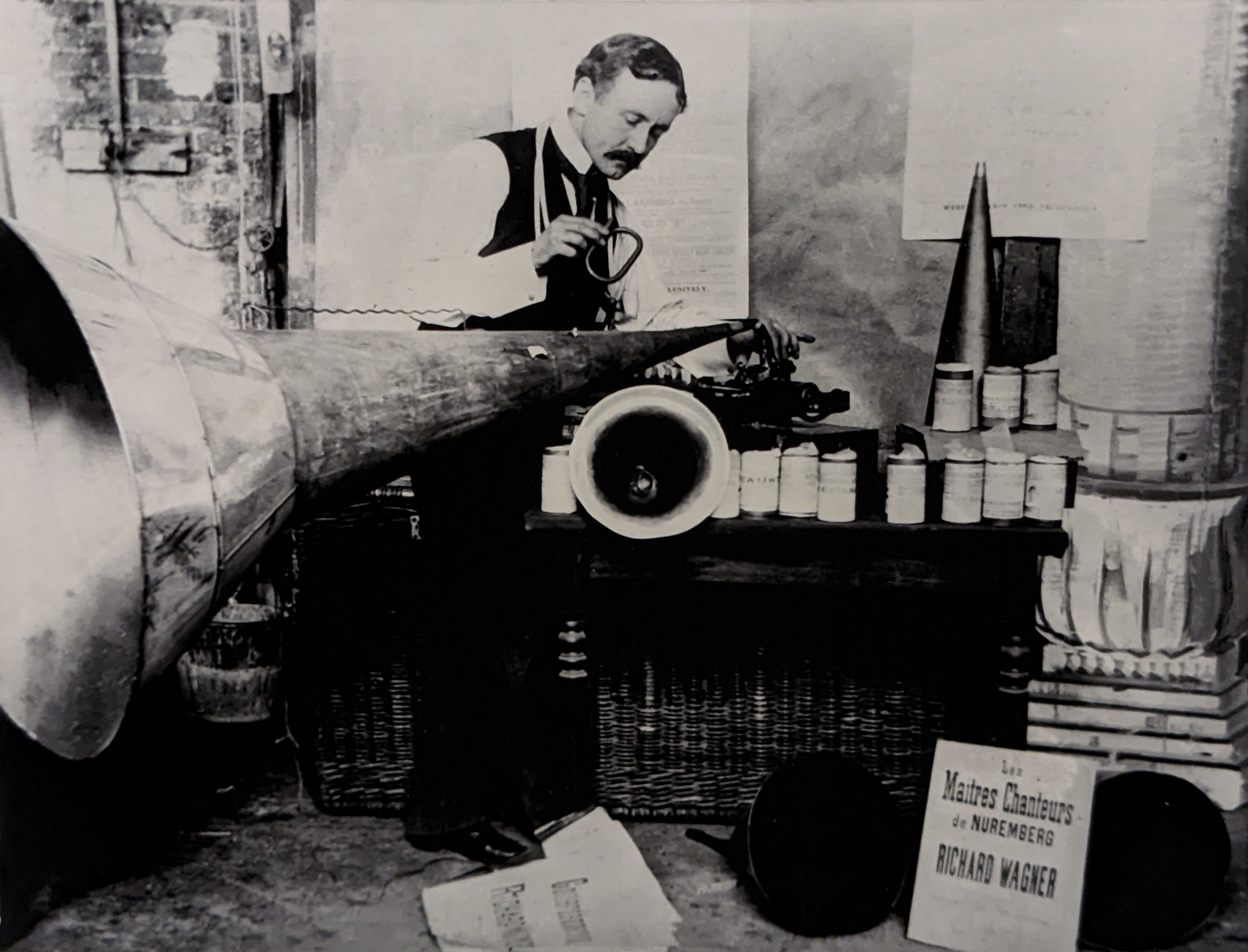
Mapleson with his Edison Home Phonograph

On March 17, 1900, Lionel Mapleson, the librarian of the Metropolitan Opera House in New York City, purchased an Edison ‘Home’ phonograph, which, like most cylinder phonographs, could be used to make records as well as play them. Mapleson was apparently enchanted with the acoustic device, and on March 21, 1900, his friend, the cellist and occasional composer Leo Stern, presented him with attachments for it: Bettini recorder and reproducer units. By the end of the month, Mapleson had persuaded the soprano Marcella Sembrich to record her vocalization of Johann Strauss's "Frühlingsstimmen" into it.

The following year, Mapleson came up with the idea of putting the recorder in the prompter's box of the Met. His first effort recorded Nellie Melba singing a scrap of music during a performance of Massenet's Le Cid on January 16, 1901. He recorded several more times during performances, still utilizing the prompter's box, but often with unsatisfactory results. After a short cessation and with the commencement of the 1901–1902 season, he resumed his recording activity from the Met's fly system. This time, he employed a huge recording horn that could capture the sounds emanating from singers and orchestra stationed below. He was thus able to unobtrusively record bits of many stage performances from 1901 through 1903. The morning after his recording 'session', he would invite the artists involved to listen to playbacks of their performances. His recording activity continued until the end of the 1902–1903 season. At that point Mapleson either lost interest or was forbidden by the Met's management from continuing his recording activities (although a few cylinders exist of orchestral rehearsals or concerts dating from 1904).

== IRCC ==
Alerted to the cylinders' existence from an article published in the December 28, 1935, issue of The New Yorker, William H. Seltsam, secretary (actually head) of the International Record Collectors' Club (IRCC), met with Mapleson a few months before his death on December 21, 1937. Mapleson offered two cylinders with the challenge to derive something from them. Seltsam's experiment met with success and after Mapleson's death, was able to borrow 120 cylinders from his estate for the purpose of releasing them on IRCC issues. Over the remainder of Seltsam's lifetime, the IRCC was able to issue about 60 sides on 78-rpm records and LPs.

After Mapleson's death, a number of cylinders were found in a junk store in Brooklyn, and were purchased by various collectors.

== New York Public Library and CD reissue ==
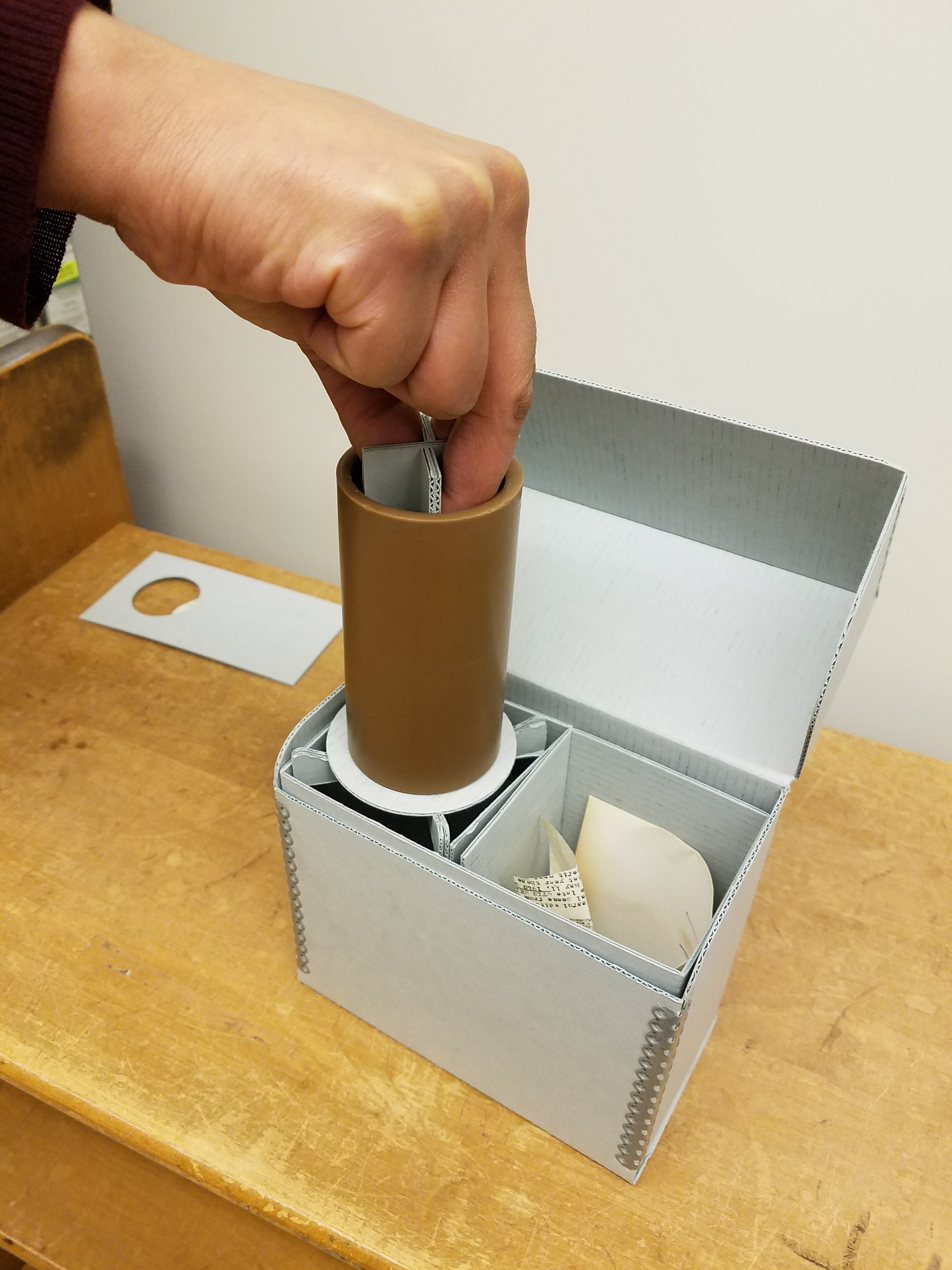
A sound archivist holds a cylinder from a 1901 performance of Meyerbeer's Les Huguenots

With the co-operation of collectors, by 1962 eventually all existing Mapleson Cylinders had become the property of The Rodgers and Hammerstein Archives of Recorded Sound, a division of The New York Public Library. In 1985, under the direction of David Hall, the library transferred all the existing cylinders to six LPs which were released with a 72-page booklet containing translations and extensive historical and biographical notes.

In 2000, David Hamilton and Seth Winner gave a lecture-demonstration to determine whether any more sound information could be retrieved from the cylinders using the most modern technology then available. Their verdict was that the cylinders were then too deteriorated to retrieve much more information than previous dubbings.

A number of the cylinders have been reissued on CD by the Romophone and Marston record labels as part of wider anthologies devoted to individual singers. A comprehensive but unauthorized CD transfer of the cylinders was issued in 1987 by the British company Symposium Records (catalogue number: Symposium 1284). For its reissue, Symposium used the IRCC 78 rpm recordings made in the 1940s.
