= Faust discography =

Recordings of Gounod's opera

This is a list of recordings of the opera Faust (1859) by Charles Gounod, sung in French unless otherwise noted.

== Audio recordings ==
Year	Cast (Faust, Mephistopheles Marguerite)	Conductor, Opera house and orchestra	Label
1908	Carl Jörn; Paul Knüpfer; Emmy Destinn	Bruno Seidler-Winkler; Grammophone Orchestra Berlin, Berlin State Opera chorus (sung in German)	LP: Grammophon; CD: Supraphon; Cat: 11 2136-2
1911–1912	Léon Beyle; André Gresse; Jeanne Campredon	François Ruhlmann; Studio orchestra and chorus	LP: Pathé; CD: Marston Records; Cat: 53007-2
1918	Giuliano Romagnoli; Fernando Autori; Gemma Bosini	Carlo Sabajno; Teatro alla Scala orchestra and chorus (sung in Italian)	LP: La voce del padrone Cat: S 5260-5298; CD: Divine Art; Cat: DDH 27810
1929	Antonio Melandri; Nazzareno De Angelis; Gina Cigna	Lorenzo Molajoli; Teatro alla Scala orchestra and chorus (sung in Italian)	LP: Columbia Records
1929–1930	Heddle Nash; Robert Easton; Miriam Licette	Thomas Beecham; BBC Symphony Orchestra and chorus (sung in English)	CD: Opera d'Oro; Cat: OPD 9010
1930	César Vezzani; Marcel Journet; Mireille Berthon	Henri Büsser; L'Opéra de Paris orchestra and chorus	CD: Membran; Cat: 231136
1937	Helge Rosvaenge; Georg Hann; Margarete Teschemacher	Joseph Keilberth; Reichssender Stuttgart orchestra and chorus (sung in German)	CD: Arkadia; Cat: 5054
1938	Helge Rosvaenge; Michael Bohnen; Hilde Singenstreu	Heinrich Steiner; Reichssender Berlin orchestra and chorus	CD: Myto Records; Cat: MCD992H030
1940	Richard Crooks; Ezio Pinza; Helen Jepson	Wilfrid Pelletier; Metropolitan Opera orchestra and chorus	CD: Naxos Historical; Cat: 8.110016-17
1947	Ivan Kozlovsky; Mark Reizen; Elizaveta Shumskaya	Vassili Nebolsin; Bolshoi Theatre orchestra and chorus (sung in Russian)	LP: Melodia; Cat: 05776-83; CD: Dante Lys; Cat: 301-3
1947–1948	Georges Noré; Roger Rico; Géori Boué	Thomas Beecham; Royal Philharmonic Orchestra and chorus	LP: RCA Victor; Cat: LCT-6100; CD: Naxos Historical; Cat: 8.110117-18
1949	Giuseppe Di Stefano; Italo Tajo; Dorothy Kirsten	Wilfrid Pelletier; Metropolitan Opera orchestra and chorus	CD: Myto Records; Cat: MCD001H037
1950	Jussi Björling; Cesare Siepi; Dorothy Kirsten	Fausto Cleva; Metropolitan Opera orchestra and chorus	CD: Naxos Historical; Cat: 8.111083-85
1951	Eugene Conley; Cesare Siepi; Eleanor Steber	Fausto Cleva; Metropolitan Opera orchestra and chorus	CD: Preiser Records; Cat: 20015
1953	Nicolai Gedda; Boris Christoff; Victoria de los Ángeles	André Cluytens; L'Opéra de Paris orchestra and chorus	CD: EMI; Cat: CMS 5 65256-2; CD: Malibran; Cat: CMS5652562
1954	Ferruccio Tagliavini; Boris Christoff; Anna Maria Rovere	Gabriele Santini; Teatro di San Carlo orchestra and chorus (sung in Italian)	CD: Bongiovanni; Cat: HOC009
1956	Gianni Poggi; Raffaele Arié; Marcella Pobbe	Fausto Cleva; Teatro di San Carlo orchestra and chorus (sung in Italian)	CD: Andromeda; Cat: ANDRCD5054; Bongiovanni; Cat: HOC041/42
1958	Nicolai Gedda; Boris Christoff; Victoria de los Ángeles	André Cluytens; L'Opéra de Paris orchestra and chorus	CD: EMI Classics; Cat: 65256-2
1958	Nicolai Gedda; Jerome Hines; Hilde Gueden	Jean Paul Morel; Metropolitan Opera orchestra and chorus	CD: Walhall; Cat: WLCD0270
1959	Jussi Björling; Cesare Siepi; Elisabeth Söderström	Jean Paul Morel; Metropolitan Opera orchestra and chorus	CD: Myto Records; Cat: MCD00174
1959	Ilija Jossifov; Nicolai Ghiaurov; Katja Popova	Atanas Margaritov; Sofia National Opera orchestra and chorus	CD: Gala; Cat: GL100625
1960	Eugenio Fernandi; Nicola Rossi-Lemeni; Renata Scotto	Armando La Rosa Parodi; RAI National Symphony Orchestra and chorus	CD: Myto Records; Cat: MCD00246
1960	Gustave Botiaux; Xavier Dupraz; Andréa Guiot	Jésus Etcheverry	LP: Orphée; Cat:
1966	Franco Corelli; Nicolai Ghiaurov; Joan Sutherland	Richard Bonynge; London Symphony Orchestra, Ambrosian Opera Chorus	CD: Decca Records; Cat: 470563-2
1967	Gianni Raimondi; Nicolai Ghiaurov; Mirella Freni	Georges Prêtre; Teatro alla Scala orchestra and chorus	CD: Opera d'Oro; Cat: OPD1294
1968	Michele Molese; Norman Treigle; Beverly Sills	Julius Rudel; New York City Opera orchestra and chorus	CD: Opera Depot; Cat: 10772-02
1971	Nicolai Gedda; Nicolai Ghiaurov; Heather Harper	Gianandrea Gavazzeni; Teatro Colón orchestra and chorus	CD: Opera d'Oro; Cat: OPD1443
1973	Alfredo Kraus; Nicolai Ghiaurov; Renata Scotto	Paul Ethuin; NHK Symphony Orchestra; Ambrosian Opera chorus	CD: Nota Blu; Cat:
1973	György Korondy; Kolos Kováts; Sylvia Sass	Ervin Lukács; Hungarian State Opera House orchestra Hungarian Radio and Television chorus Honved Ensemble Male Choir (sung in Hungarian)	CD: Hungaroton; Cat: HCD32411
1976	Giacomo Aragall; Paul Plishka; Montserrat Caballé	Alain Lombard; Orchestre philharmonique de Strasbourg; Opéra national du Rhin chorus	LP: RCA Red Seal; Cat: FRL4-2493; CD: Erato; Cat: 45685
1978	Plácido Domingo; Nicolai Ghiaurov; Mirella Freni	Georges Prêtre; L'Opéra de Paris orchestra and chorus	CD: EMI Classics; Cat: 5 09166
1986	Francisco Araiza; Yevgeny Nesterenko; Kiri Te Kanawa	Colin Davis; Bavarian Radio Symphony Orchestra and chorus	CD: Philips; Cat: 475 7769
1989	Alberto Cupido, Simon Estes, Rosalind Plowright	Seiji Ozawa, French National Orchestra and Radio France Chorus	Audio CD: Deutsche Grammophon, Cat: 426 596-2
1991	Richard Leech; José van Dam; Cheryl Studer	Michel Plasson; Orchestre national du Capitole de Toulouse; French Army Chorus	CD: EMI Classics; Cat: CDS 5 56224-2
1993	Jerry Hadley; Samuel Ramey; Cecilia Gasdia	Carlo Rizzi; Welsh National Opera orchestra and chorus	CD: Warner Classics; Cat: 4 509-90 872-2
1999	Paul Charles Clarke; Alastair Miles; Mary Plazas	David Parry; Philharmonia Orchestra, Geoffrey Mitchell Choir (sung in English)	CD: Chandos; Cat: 3014(3)
2009	Piotr Beczała; Kwangchul Youn; Soile Isokoski	Bertrand de Billy; Vienna State Opera orchestra and chorus	CD: Orfeo; Cat: C 805 103 D
2016	Aljaž Farasin; Carlo Colombara; Marjukka Tepponen	Ville Matvejeff; Croatian National Theatre in Rijeka – Opera orchestra and choir (1864 London version)	CD: Naxos; Cat: 8.660456-58
2018	Benjamin Bernheim; Andrew Foster-Williams; Véronique Gens	Christophe Rousset; Les Talens Lyriques, Flemish Radio Choir (1859 version)	CD: Bru Zane; Cat: BZ 1037

== Video recordings ==
Year	Cast (Faust, Mephistopheles Marguerite, Valentin)	Conductor, Opera house and orchestra (production details)	Label
1985	Francisco Araiza, Ruggero Raimondi, Gabriela Beňačková, Walton Grönroos	Erich Binder, Vienna State Opera Orchestra and Chorus (Production and video director: Ken Russell; recorded live, 23 March 1985)	DVD: DGG; Cat: 073 4108
2004	Roberto Alagna, Bryn Terfel, Angela Gheorghiu, Simon Keenlyside	Antonio Pappano, Royal Opera House Orchestra & Chorus (Stage director: David McVicar)	DVD: EMI; Cat: 6316119
2014	Jonas Kaufmann, René Pape, Marina Poplavskaya, Russell Braun	Yannick Nézet-Séguin, Metropolitan Opera Orchestra & Chorus (Stage director: Des McAnuff)	HD video: Met Opera on Demand; Blu-ray/DVD: Decca
2015	Charles Castronovo, Ildar Abdrazakov, Irina Lungu, Vasilij Ladjuk	Gianandrea Noseda, Teatro Regio di Torino Orchestra & Chorus (Production and choreographer: Stefano Poda)	HD video: Unitel/medici.tv
2018	Piotr Beczała, Luca Pisaroni, Marina Rebeka, Stéphane Degout	Dan Ettinger, Teatro Real, Madrid (Stage director: Àlex Ollé; recorded live, September 2018)	Blu-ray/DVD: C Major
2019	Michael Fabiano, Erwin Schrott, Irina Lungu, Stéphane Degout	Dan Ettinger, Royal Opera House Orchestra & Chorus (Production: David McVicar)	HD video: ROH Stream, medici.tv
2021	Benjamin Bernheim, Christian Van Horn, Ermonela Jaho, Florian Sempey	Lorenzo Viotti, Paris Opera Orchestra & Chorus (Director: Tobias Kratzer; recorded live at the Opéra Bastille)	HD video: Paris Opera Play
