= List of premieres at the Metropolitan Opera =

Throughout its history the Metropolitan Opera has taken a leading role at introducing both original stage works to the world and bringing works from around the globe to the United States for the first time. The following is a list of works that have premiered at the Met. All works are operas unless otherwise stated.

== World premieres ==
Opera	Composer	Date of premiere
La fanciulla del West	Giacomo Puccini	1910-12-10
Königskinder	Engelbert Humperdinck	1910-12-28
Mona	Horatio Parker	1912-03-14
Cyrano	Walter Damrosch	1913-02-27
Madeleine	Victor Herbert	1914-01-24
Madame Sans-Gêne	Umberto Giordano	1915-01-25
Goyescas	Enrique Granados	1916-01-28
The Canterbury Pilgrims	Reginald De Koven	1917-03-08
Shanewis	Charles Wakefield Cadman	1918-03-23
The Dance in Place Congo (ballet)	Henry F. Gilbert	1918-03-23
Il trittico	Giacomo Puccini	1918-12-14
The Legend	Joseph Carl Breil	1919-03-12
The Temple Dancer	John Adam Hugo	1919-03-12
L'oiseau bleu	Albert Wolff	1919-12-27
Cleopatra's Night	Henry Kimball Hadley	1920-01-31
Skyscrapers (ballet)	John Alden Carpenter	1926-02-19
The King's Henchman	Deems Taylor	1927-02-17
Peter Ibbetson	Deems Taylor	1931-02-07
The Emperor Jones	Louis Gruenberg	1933-01-07
Merry Mount	Howard Hanson	1934-02-10
In the Pasha's Garden	John Laurence Seymour	1935-01-24
The Man Without a Country	Walter Damrosch	1937-05-12
The Island God	Gian Carlo Menotti	1942-02-20
The Warrior	Bernard Rogers	1947-01-11
Vanessa	Samuel Barber	1958-01-15
Antony and Cleopatra	Samuel Barber	1966-09-16
Mourning Becomes Electra	Marvin David Levy	1967-03-17
The Ghosts of Versailles	John Corigliano	1991-12-19
The Voyage	Philip Glass	1992-10-12
The Great Gatsby	John Harbison	1999-12-20
An American Tragedy	Tobias Picker	2005-12-02
The First Emperor	Tan Dun	2006-12-21
The Hours	Kevin Puts	2022-11-22
The Amazing Adventures of Kavalier & Clay	Mason Bates	2025-09-21
Lincoln in the Bardo	Missy Mazzoli	2026-10-19

== United States premieres ==
Opera	Composer	Date of premiere
La Gioconda	Amilcare Ponchielli	1883-12-20
Carmen	Georges Bizet	1884-01-09
Fidelio	Ludwig van Beethoven	1884-11-19
Die Walküre	Richard Wagner	1885-01-30
Die Königin von Saba	Karl Goldmark	1885-12-02
Die Meistersinger von Nürnberg	Richard Wagner	1886-01-04
Das goldene Kreuz	Ignaz Brüll	1886-11-19
Tristan und Isolde	Richard Wagner	1886-12-01
Merlin	Karl Goldmark	1887-01-03
Siegfried	Richard Wagner	1887-11-09
Der Trompeter von Säckingen	Viktor Nessler	1887-11-23
Euryanthe	Carl Maria von Weber	1887-12-23
Fernand Cortez	Gaspare Spontini	1888-01-06
Götterdämmerung	Richard Wagner	1888-01-25
Das Rheingold	Richard Wagner	1889-01-04
Tannhäuser	Richard Wagner	1889-01-30
Der Barbier von Bagdad	Peter Cornelius	1890-01-03
Asrael	Alberto Franchetti	1890-11-26
Il Vassallo di Szigeth	Antonio Smareglia	1890-12-12
Diana von Solange	Ernest II, Duke of Saxe-Coburg and Gotha	1891-01-09
Werther	Jules Massenet	1894-03-29
Elaine	Herman Bemberg	1894-12-17
Manon	Jules Massenet	1895-01-16
Falstaff	Giuseppe Verdi	1895-02-04
La Navarraise	Jules Massenet	1895-12-11
Ero e Leandro	Luigi Mancinelli	1899-03-10
Tosca	Giacomo Puccini	1901-02-04
Messaline	Isidore de Lara	1902-01-22
Manru	Ignacy Jan Paderewski	1902-02-14
Der Wald	Ethel Smyth	1903-03-11
Parsifal	Richard Wagner	1903-12-24
Fedora	Umberto Giordano	1906-12-05
La damnation de Faust	Hector Berlioz	1906-12-07
Salome	Richard Strauss	1907-01-22
Tiefland	Eugen d'Albert	1908-11-23
Le Villi	Giacomo Puccini	1908-12-17
La Wally	Alfredo Catalani	1909-01-06
Germania	Alberto Franchetti	1910-01-22
L'attaque du moulin	Alfred Bruneau	1910-02-08
The Queen of Spades	Pyotr Ilyich Tchaikovsky	1910-03-05
Armide	Christoph Willibald Gluck	1910-11-14
Ariane et Barbe-bleue	Paul Dukas	1911-03-29
Lobetanz	Ludwig Thuille	1911-11-18
Le donne curiose	Ermanno Wolf-Ferrari	1912-01-03
Versiegelt	Leo Blech	1912-01-20
La Vita Nuova (cantata)	Ermanno Wolf-Ferrari	1912-01-28
L'Orfeo	Claudio Monteverdi	1912-04-14
Boris Godunov	Modest Mussorgsky	1913-03-19
Der Rosenkavalier	Richard Strauss	1913-12-09
L'amore dei tre re	Italo Montemezzi	1914-01-02
Julien	Gustave Charpentier	1914-02-26
L'amore medico	Ermanno Wolf-Ferrari	1914-03-25
L'oracolo	Franco Leoni	1915-02-04
Prince Igor	Alexander Borodin	1915-12-30
Iphigénie en Tauride	Christoph Willibald Gluck	1916-11-25
Francesca da Rimini	Riccardo Zandonai	1916-12-22
Mârouf, savetier du Caire	Henri Rabaud	1917-12-19
The Legend of Saint Elisabeth (a staged oratorio)	Franz Liszt	1918-01-03
Lodoletta	Pietro Mascagni	1918-01-12
The Golden Cockerel	Nikolai Rimsky-Korsakov	1918-03-06
La reine Fiammette	Xavier Leroux	1919-01-24
Eugene Onegin	Pyotr Ilyich Tchaikovsky	1920-03-24
Il Carillon Magico (ballet)	Riccardo Pick-Mangiagalli	1920-12-02
Der Polnische Jude	Karel Weis	1921-03-09
Die tote Stadt	Erich Wolfgang Korngold	1921-11-19
The Snow Maiden	Nikolai Rimsky-Korsakov	1922-01-23
Così fan tutte	Wolfgang Amadeus Mozart	1922-03-24
Anima allegra	Franco Vittadini	1923-02-14
Mona Lisa	Max von Schillings	1923-03-01
I Compagnacci	Primo Riccitelli	1924-01-02
Jenůfa	Leoš Janáček	1924-12-06
Giovanni Gallurese	Italo Montemezzi	1925-02-19
La cena delle beffe	Umberto Giordano	1926-01-02
La vida breve	Manuel de Falla	1926-03-06
Le Rossignol	Igor Stravinsky	1926-03-06
Turandot	Giacomo Puccini	1926-11-16
Violanta	Erich Wolfgang Korngold	1927-11-05
Madonna Imperia	Franco Alfano	1928-02-08
La rondine	Giacomo Puccini	1928-03-10
Die ägyptische Helena	Richard Strauss	1928-11-06
La campana sommersa	Ottorino Respighi	1928-11-24
Jonny spielt auf	Ernst Krenek	1929-01-19
Fra Gherardo	Ildebrando Pizzetti	1929-03-21
Sadko	Nikolai Rimsky-Korsakov	1930-01-25
The Fair at Sorochyntsi	Modest Mussorgsky	1930-11-29
Le Preziose Ridicole	Felice Lattuada	1930-12-10
Schwanda the Bagpiper	Jaromír Weinberger	1931-11-07
La Notte di Zoraima	Italo Montemezzi	1931-12-02
Simon Boccanegra	Giuseppe Verdi	1932-01-28
Il signor Bruschino	Gioachino Rossini	1932-12-09
Caponsacchi	Richard Hageman	1937-02-04
Alceste	Christoph Willibald Gluck	1941-01-24
The Rake's Progress	Igor Stravinsky	1953-02-14
Arabella	Richard Strauss	1955-02-10
Atlántida (cantata)	Manuel de Falla	1962-09-29
The Last Savage	Gian Carlo Menotti	1964-01-23
The Happy Prince	Malcolm Williamson	1967-08-21
Syllabaire pour Phèdre	Maurice Ohana	1973-02-17
Death in Venice	Benjamin Britten	1974-10-18
Le siège de Corinthe	Gioachino Rossini	1975-04-07
Cyrano de Bergerac	Franco Alfano	2005-05-13
Two Boys	Nico Muhly	2013-10-21
The Exterminating Angel	Thomas Adès	2017-10-26
Marnie	Nico Muhly	2018-10-19
Hamlet	Brett Dean	2022-05-13

== Sources ==
- Metropolitan Opera archives
