= CAMRA (disambiguation) =

CAMRA or the Campaign for Real Ale is a British organisation promoting traditional beer.

CAMRA may also refer to:

- Canberra Academy of Music and Related Arts, an Australian community music and theatre organisation
- CAMRa or Chilbolton Advanced Meteorological Radar
- Center for Advancing Microbial Risk Assessment, one of the United States Homeland Security Centers of Excellence

== See also ==
- Camera (disambiguation)
- Camara (disambiguation)
- Camras, a surname
