= Lucrezia Bori =

Spanish operatic singer

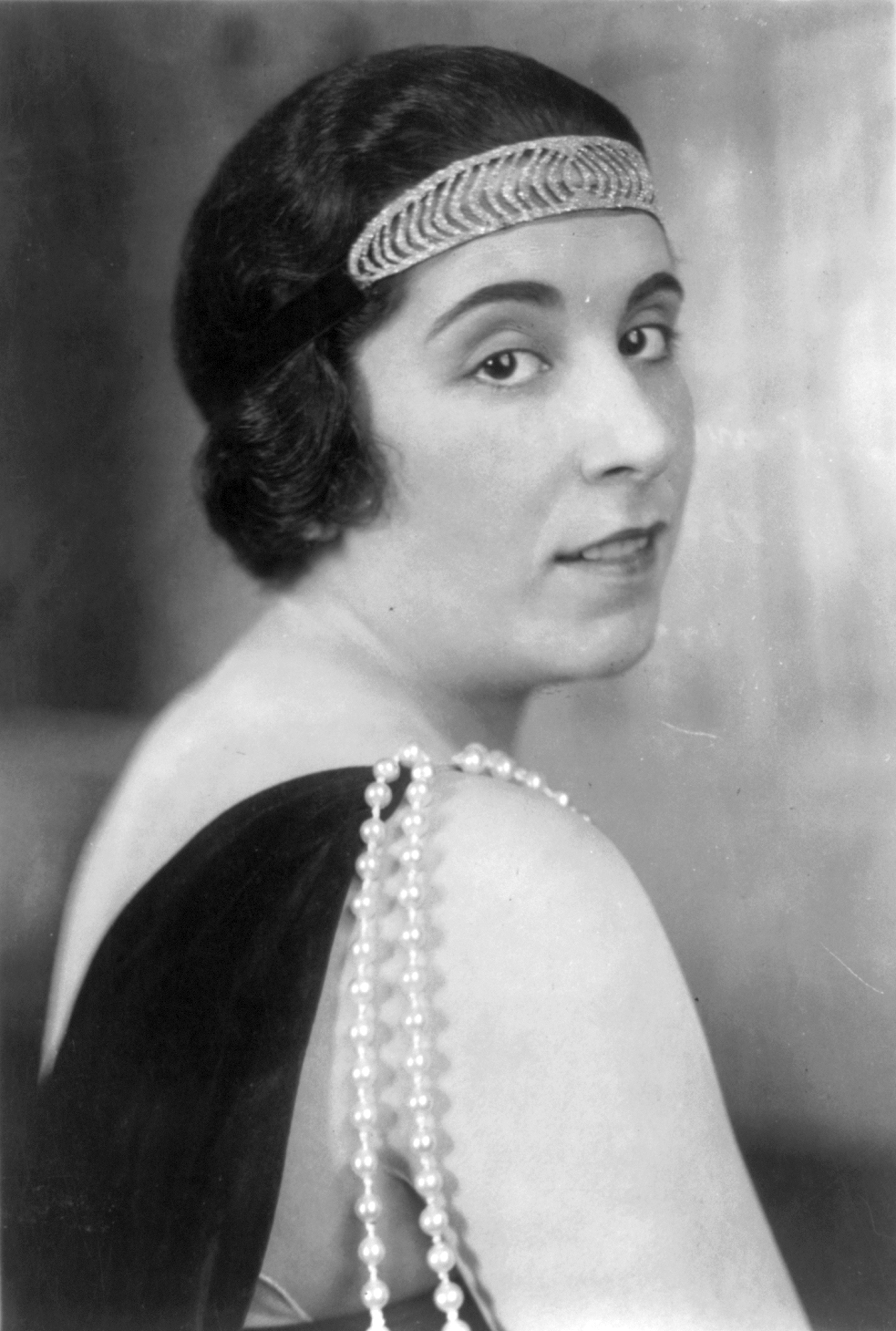
Lucrezia Bori

"Ah, fors'è lui" ... "Sempre libera"
From Verdi's La traviata, 1910 for Edison Records

Lucrezia Bori (24 December 1887 – 14 May 1960) was a Spanish operatic singer, a lyric soprano and a fundraiser for the Metropolitan Opera.

== Biography ==
Lucrezia Bori was born on 24 December 1887, in Valencia, Spain. Her real name was Lucrecia Borja y González de Riancho. Her father was an officer in the Spanish army. Her family were descended from the influential family of the Italian Renaissance, the House of Borgia and she herself was named after her ancestor, Lucrezia Borgia.

Her voice had a unique timbre and transparent quality unlike any present-day singer. She studied in Milan with Vidal and made her debut at the Teatro Adriano in Rome as Micaëla in Bizet's Carmen on 31 October 1908. In December 1910, she made her debut at La Scala as Carolina in Cimarosa's Il matrimonio segreto; the following year, she sang Octavian in the Italian premiere of Der Rosenkavalier there.

Her career at the Metropolitan Opera began in the summer of 1910 during the Met's first visit to Paris. On 9 June of that year she replaced a singer who had become ill in the role of Manon in Puccini's Manon Lescaut. On the opening night of the 1912/13 season, she made her debut with the Met in New York when she sang Manon opposite Enrico Caruso. In 1915, she was forced to stop singing for a surgical operation to remove nodes on her vocal cords. Following a lengthy convalescence, she returned to the stage in 1921. During the course of her career with the opera, she appeared a total of 629 times and sang the leading role in 39 operas, including the title role in the U.S. premiere of Rimsky-Korsakov's Snow Maiden.

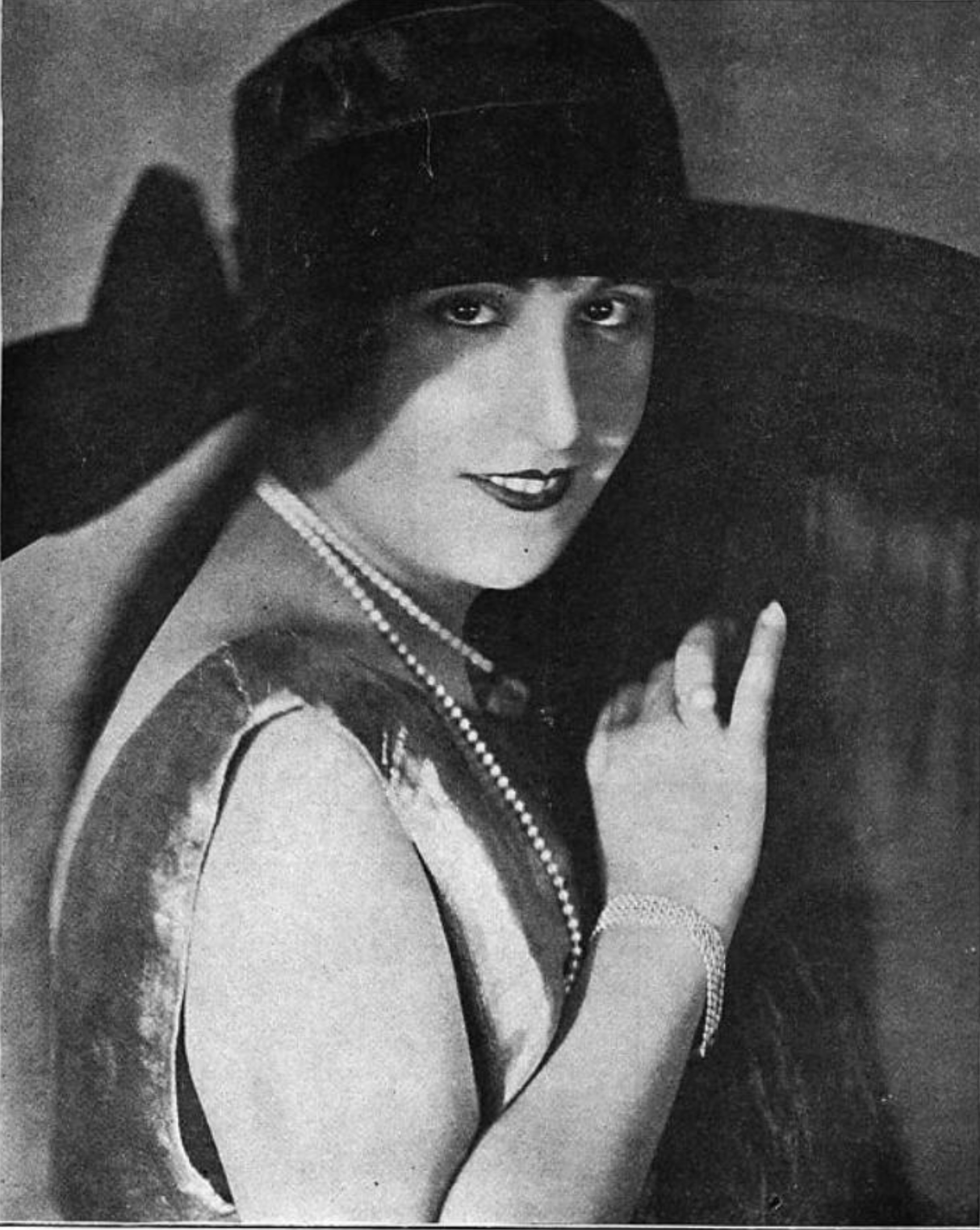
Bori in 1925

In 1930, Bori appeared on the cover of Time. She was famous for her portrayals of Manon in Massenet's opera; Mimì in La bohème; Fiora in L'amore dei tre re; Mélisande in Pelléas et Mélisande; and Violetta in La traviata.

Beginning late in 1932, Bori began a career as fundraiser. When the Great Depression struck, the Met continued to sell tickets to performances with no difficulty, but the contributions of its stockholders fell off dramatically and by the end of 1932 the board of directors found that a great deal of money would be needed if the next season were to be held. Early in 1933, Bori agreed to work with the Met's managers to obtain the funds. In this work she was not just a figurehead. She headed an organization called the Committee to Save the Metropolitan Opera House and, in actions that were widely reported in the press, she made appeals by flyer, letter, and in personal contacts with potential benefactors. After a personal appeal from her during a radio broadcast of Wagner's Tristan und Isolde on 11 March 1933, she sent personal acknowledgements to the thousands of people who responded. She also traveled widely and participated in numerous benefits, at which she performed. During this period of fundraising, she continued to carry out an arduous schedule of performance. It took only two months to raise the $300,000 that was needed.

In May 1933, the chairman of the Metropolitan board publicly thanked Bori, saying she had accomplished a feat that was thought to be impossible. He said she "took command of the situation and applied to the fulfillment of the purpose in hand the same qualities of imagination and genius which have, in her own work made her one of the greatest artists of all time."

From 1933 to 1935 Bori served as chair of the "Maintain the Metropolitan" committee which had succeeded the "Save the Metropolitan" committee. To assure the viability of the 1934/35 opera season, this committee raised an amount approximately equal to the sum raised the previous year. In 1935, she was the first performer to be elected to the Board of Directors of the Metropolitan Opera Association. In joining the board she continued to sit on its opera management committee.

Her farewell gala on 29 March 1936, was one of the great events at the Metropolitan. Bori sang scenes from Manon and La traviata, with contributions from Flagstad, Melchior, Rethberg, Pinza, Ponselle, Martinelli, Tibbett and Richard Crooks.

Bori continued to perform in recitals and record for some years after her Metropolitan retirement; she can be heard, for example, in "off-the-air" recordings of a Hollywood Bowl concert from 1937, singing "Si, mi chiamano Mimì" and "O soave fanciulla" with tenor Joseph Bentonelli, with the Los Angeles Philharmonic under Otto Klemperer. After her retirement from singing she was named chairman of the Metropolitan Opera Guild. Under her leadership the Guild collected musical instruments for military hospitals and performed other war activities as well as boosting opera throughout the country.

Bori suffered a cerebral hemorrhage on 2 May 1960, and she died in Roosevelt Hospital on 14 May. She had never married, believing that artists should not do so.

== Recordings ==
Bori's complete recordings for the Victor Talking Machine Company/ RCA Victor were issued on four compact discs by Romophone in 1995, numbers 81016-2 and 81017-2, with transfers and audio restoration by Ward Marston, who is planning a reissue of her complete Edison recordings in his own Marstonrecords label. Live recordings (airchecks) also exist of her farewell gala at the Met on 29 March 1936.

Bori's recordings of "El jilguerito con pico de oro" [The little goldfinch with the golden beak] (Blas de Laserna) and arias from Acis y Galatea (Antonio de Literes) with George Copeland (piano) were published on the compilation CD Great Voices of the Century Sing Exotica, published by SanCtuS Recordings, on which Bori appears in the context of other great voices of her time.

== Bibliography ==
- Rasponi, Lanfranco (1982). The last prima donnas. New York: Alfred A. Knopf. ISBN 978-0-394-52153-4.
- Marion, John Francis (1962). Lucrezia Bori of the Metropolitan Opera. New York: P.J. Kenedy & Sons.
