= Rosa Ponselle =

American operatic soprano (1897–1981)

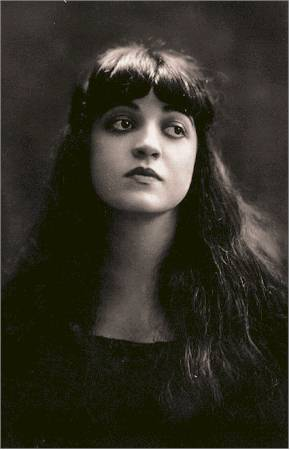
Rosa Ponzillo, aged 21 (1918)

Rosa Ponzillo, known as Rosa Ponselle (January 22, 1897 – May 25, 1981) was an American operatic dramatic soprano.

She sang mainly at the New York Metropolitan Opera and is generally considered to have been one of the greatest sopranos of the 20th century.

== Early life ==
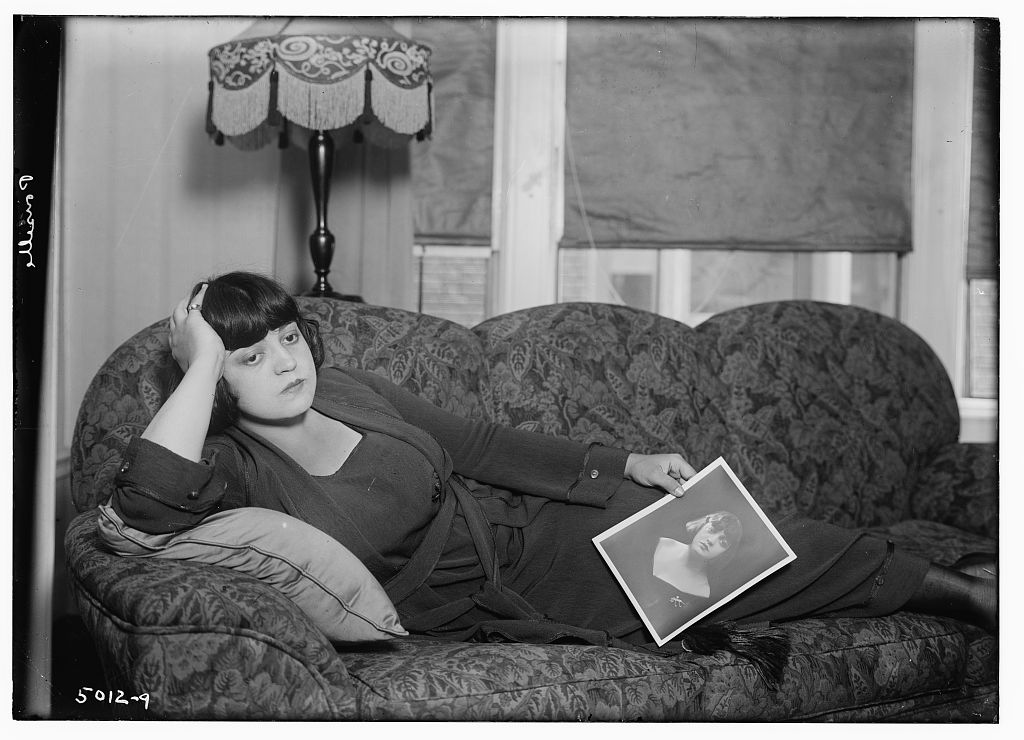
Rosa Ponselle in 1919

She was born Rosa Ponzillo on January 22, 1897, in Meriden, Connecticut, the youngest of three children. The family lived on the city's west side in a neighbourhood chiefly populated by immigrants from Southern Italy, first at the corner of Lewis Avenue and Bartlett Street, then on Foster Street, where Ponselle was born, moving when she was three to Springdale Avenue. Her parents were Italian immigrants from Caiazzo, near Caserta. Ponselle had an exceptionally mature voice at an early age and, at least in her early years, sang on natural endowment with little, if any, vocal training. Instead, her early prowess as a piano student (which was cultivated by a local music teacher, Anna Ryan, the organist of a nearby Catholic church), seemed to incline Rosa to instrumental rather than vocal music. But with the influence and example of her older sister, Carmela, who was then pursuing a career as a cabaret singer, Rosa began to augment her engagements as a silent-movie accompanist in and around Meriden by singing popular ballads to her audiences while the projectionist changed film reels. By 1914, her reputation as a singer led to a long-term engagement at the San Carlino theater, one of the largest movie houses in New Haven, near the Yale campus.

== Vaudeville ==
By then, Carmela was already an established singer in vaudeville after her debut in The Girl from Brighton, a 1912 Broadway musical. Three years later, in 1915, Carmela brought Rosa to audition for her vaudeville agent. In spite of being markedly overweight (a stark contrast to the fashion-model physique of her older sister), Rosa impressed with her voice, and she was hired to perform with Carmela as a "sister act". Between 1915 and 1918, the Ponzillo Sisters (also known as "Those Tailored Italian Girls") became a headlining act on the Keith Vaudeville Circuit, appearing in all the major Keith theaters and earning a substantial income in the process. The sisters' act consisted of traditional ballads, popular Italian songs, and operatic arias and duets.

In 1918, after Carmela and Rosa demanded a substantial fee increase from the Keith Vaudeville Circuit, their act was dropped. At the time, Carmela was studying in New York with a well-connected voice teacher/agent named William Thorner. Thorner auditioned Rosa, and agreed to give her lessons. (Rosa later denied that Thorner had ever given her voice lessons, but her statements on the subject are contradictory.) Although initially less impressed with Rosa's future prospects than with Carmela's, Thorner changed his opinion after the legendary baritone Victor Maurel, whom Giuseppe Verdi had chosen to create Iago in Otello, auditioned both sisters at his friend Thorner's request. Soon afterward, Thorner persuaded the Metropolitan Opera's great star tenor Enrico Caruso, to visit his studio and hear Carmela and Rosa sing. Caruso was usually wary when asked to listen to amateur singers, but he was deeply impressed with Rosa's voice. Caruso arranged an audition for Rosa attended by the Met's general manager, Giulio Gatti-Casazza. Gatti was equally impressed with Rosa's singing and offered her a contract for the Met's 1918/1919 season.

== Metropolitan Opera debut and early operatic career ==
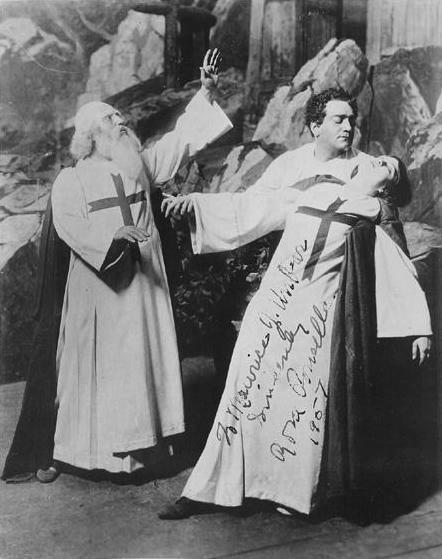
José Mardones, Enrico Caruso and Rosa Ponselle in La forza del destino at the Metropolitan Opera, 1918

Rosa Ponselle made her debut at the Metropolitan Opera on November 15, 1918, just a few days after World War I had ended, as Leonora in Verdi's La forza del destino, opposite Caruso and Giuseppe De Luca. It was her first performance on any opera stage. She was quite intimidated for being in the presence of Caruso, and in spite of an almost paralyzing case of nervousness (which she suffered from throughout her operatic career), she scored a tremendous success, both with the public and with the critics. New York Times critic James Huneker wrote: "...what a promising debut! Added to her personal attractiveness, she possesses a voice of natural beauty that may prove a gold mine; it is vocal gold, anyhow, with its luscious lower and middle tones, dark, rich and ductile, brilliant in the upper register."

In addition to Leonora, Ponselle's roles in the 1918/19 season included Santuzza in Cavalleria rusticana, Reiza in Weber's Oberon, and Carmelita in the (unsuccessful) world premiere of Joseph Carl Breil's The Legend.

In the following Met seasons, Ponselle's roles included the lead soprano roles in La Juive (opposite Caruso's Eléazar, his final new role before his death in 1921), William Tell, Ernani, Il trovatore, Aida, La Gioconda, Don Carlos, L'Africaine, L'amore dei tre re, Andrea Chénier, La vestale, and the role that many considered her greatest achievement, Bellini's Norma, in the Met's historic 1927 revival. In addition to her operatic activities, which were centered at the Met, Ponselle had a lucrative concert career. A tour of the West Coast of the United States included an appearance at the Lobero Theatre in Santa Barbara on March 14, 1927, in the Artist Series of the Community Arts Association's Music Branch, accompanied by pianist Stuart Ross. As her career progressed, Ponselle negotiated through her manager more concerts and exponentially higher fees before and after each Metropolitan Opera season.

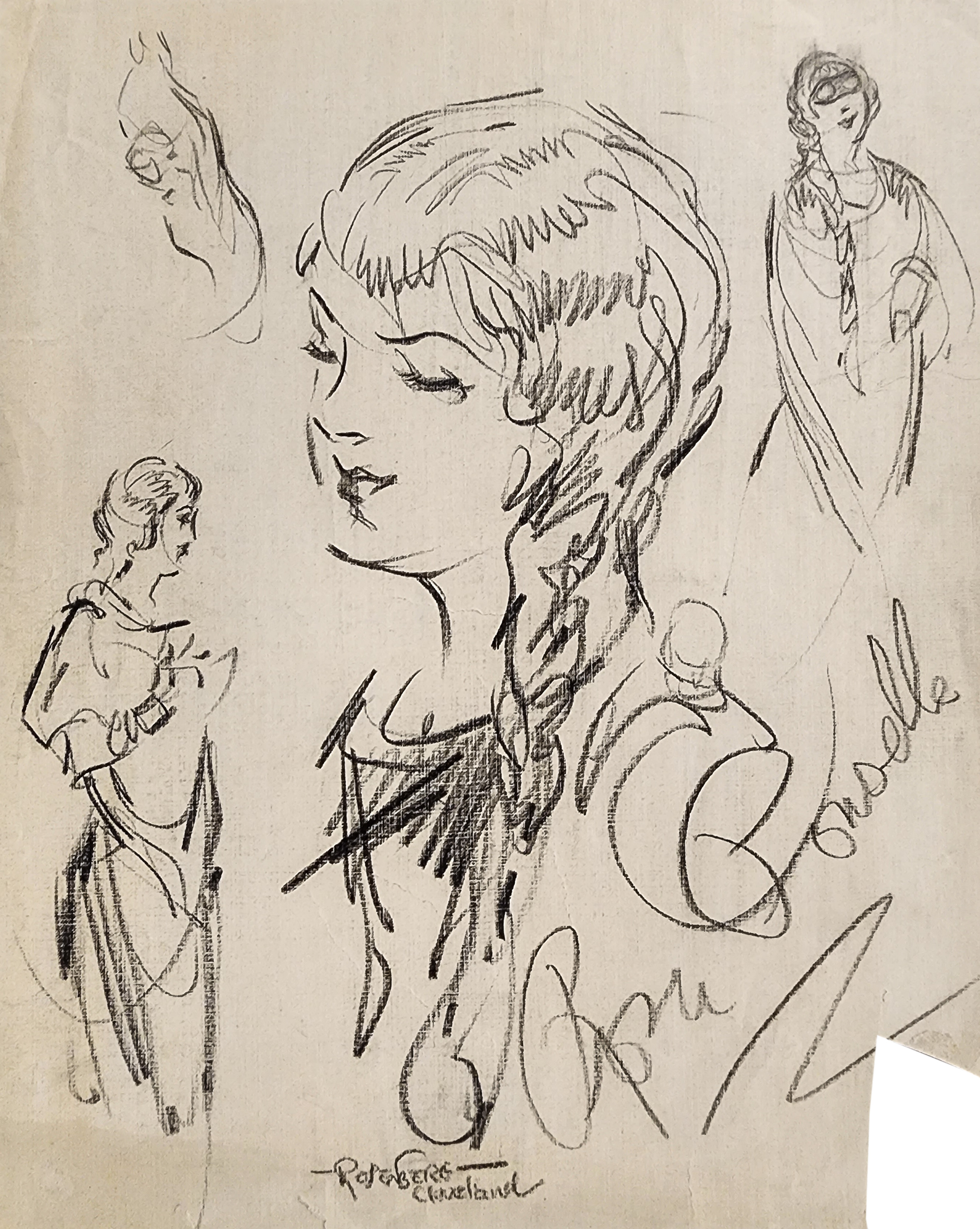
Drawing of Rosa Ponselle by Manuel Rosenberg for the Cincinnati Post, 1924

== Appearances abroad and later operatic career ==
"Un bel dì" (One fine day)
Recorded in 1919, performed by Rosa Ponselle with orchestra (4:38)

Outside the US, Ponselle sang only at Covent Garden in London (for three seasons) and in Italy (in order, so she said, to honor a promise she had made to her mother that she would one day sing in Italy). In 1929, Ponselle made her European debut in London, at the Royal Opera House at Covent Garden. Up until that time, her career had been concentrated entirely in America. Ponselle sang two roles at Covent Garden in 1929: Norma and Gioconda. She had great success and was tumultuously acclaimed by the normally staid London audiences. She returned to London in 1930 in Norma, L'amore dei tre re, and La traviata (her first performances as Violetta). In her final London season in 1931, she sang in La forza del destino, Fedra (an opera by her coach and long-time friend, Romano Romani), and a reprise of La traviata.

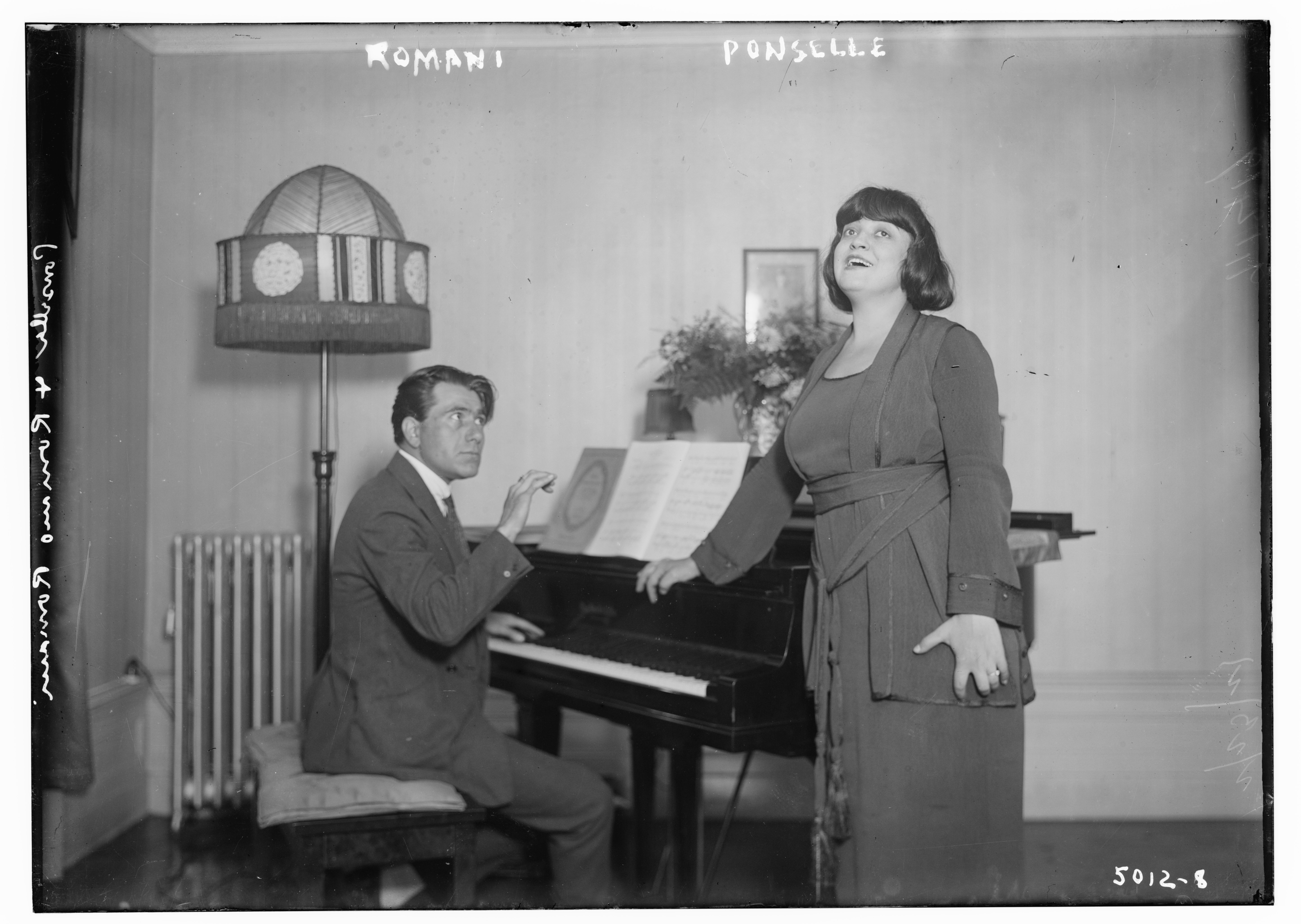
Romani and Ponselle c. 1920

In 1933 Ponselle sang her only performances in Italy, as Giulia in La vestale, with the Maggio Musicale in Florence. As in London, the audiences were wildly enthusiastic. At the second performance, Ponselle had to encore the aria, "O nume tutelar". Her success was such that she considered an engagement at Milan's La Scala, but after witnessing a Florence audience's brutal treatment of a famous tenor, Giacomo Lauri-Volpi, who cracked on a high note, she decided not to press her luck further with the notoriously difficult Italian opera-going public. Other than her appearances in London and Florence, Ponselle never sang outside the United States.

Ponselle continued in the 1930s to add roles to her repertoire at the Metropolitan Opera. In 1930 she sang her first New York appearances in 1931 as Violetta, a role she had sung with such success in London but which received a more mixed reception from the New York critics, some of whom found her interpretation too forceful and dramatic. "The eminent soprano endeavored to make every number passionately emotional by … spasmodic utterances," wrote critic W.J. Henderson. "Her attempt at transforming Verdi's plaintively pathetic conception into hard-breathing tragedy was most unfortunate." In 1931 she sang in another unsuccessful world premiere, Montemezzi's La notte di Zoraima, which sank without a trace. Like many other opera singers of that time, she made a brief trip to Hollywood and made screen tests for Metro-Goldwyn-Mayer and Paramount Pictures, but nothing came of them.

Rosa Ponselle at the NBC Radio microphone, 1936

In 1935, Ponselle sang her first Carmen at the Met. In spite of a great popular success with the role, for which she had prepared meticulously, Ponselle received a drubbing from most of the New York critics, especially Olin Downes in the New York Times, whose savagely caustic review ("We have never heard Miss Ponselle sing so badly, and we have seldom seen the part enacted in such an artificial and unconvincing manner") hurt Ponselle deeply. The only roles Ponselle sang during her last two seasons at the Met were Santuzza and Carmen, roles that did not tax her upper register. Differences with the Met management regarding repertoire led her not to renew her contract with the company for the 1937/38 season. Her last operatic performance was as Carmen on April 22, 1937, in a Met tour performance in Cleveland.

== Retirement ==
Ponselle did not consciously or purposely retire after that Cleveland Carmen in 1937; rather, it was an organic process of relinquishment in response to a range of factors. These included, amongst others, her receding upper vocal range which intensified her nerves; her dissatisfaction with the Metropolitan Opera House's refusal to accede her proposed musical repertoire (she had expressed a desire to sing Cilea's Adriana Lecouvreur, which had an appropriately low tessitura, but general manager Edward Johnson blocked any revival due to the opera's poor financial returns during its 1907–1908 season at the Met, despite the presence of Caruso in the cast); mental and physical performance exhaustion from the strain of 21 intensive years of continuous performances and rising levels of performance-related anxiety; her marriage in 1936 to Carle A. Jackson, the socialite son of the then-mayor of Baltimore; and her enjoyment of the life she now led without the demands of performing. To mark her transition, Ponselle and Jackson constructed a luxurious villa in Maryland's Green Spring Valley, called "Villa Pace", where she resided for the remainder of her life.

In 1949, Ponselle's marriage to Jackson ended in divorce. The breakup was traumatic for Ponselle, and she suffered a nervous breakdown. Although she never again appeared on the concert or opera stage, Ponselle continued to sing at home for friends, who reported that her voice was as magnificent as ever. This was further demonstrated in 1954, when RCA Victor came to Villa Pace and recorded Ponselle singing a wide variety of songs and arias. In the late 1940s, Ponselle became the mentor of the fledgling Baltimore Civic Opera Company, providing coaching and voice lessons for the young singers who appeared with the company. Among those to have received her tutelage during their Baltimore Civic Opera appearances, at the start of their careers, were Beverly Sills, Sherrill Milnes, Plácido Domingo, James Morris, Lili Chookasian, Joshua Hecht, and Martha King.

== Death ==
Ponselle died at her estate, Villa Pace near Baltimore, on May 25, 1981, aged 84, after a long battle with bone marrow cancer. She is buried in nearby Druid Ridge Cemetery. In her obituary, Allen Hughes wrote in The New York Times, "Miss Ponselle made an indelible impression through the impact of her phenomenal voice. It was a dramatic soprano that seemed to move seamlessly from the low notes of a contralto to a dazzling high C. She had coloratura flexibility, a splendid trill, powerful fortes, delicate pianissimos and precise intonation." Hughes quotes Harold C. Schonberg who wrote in 1972, "That big, pure colorful golden voice would rise effortlessly, hitting the stunned listener in the face, rolling over the body, sliding down the shoulder-blades, making one wiggle with sheer physiological pleasure."

== Recordings ==
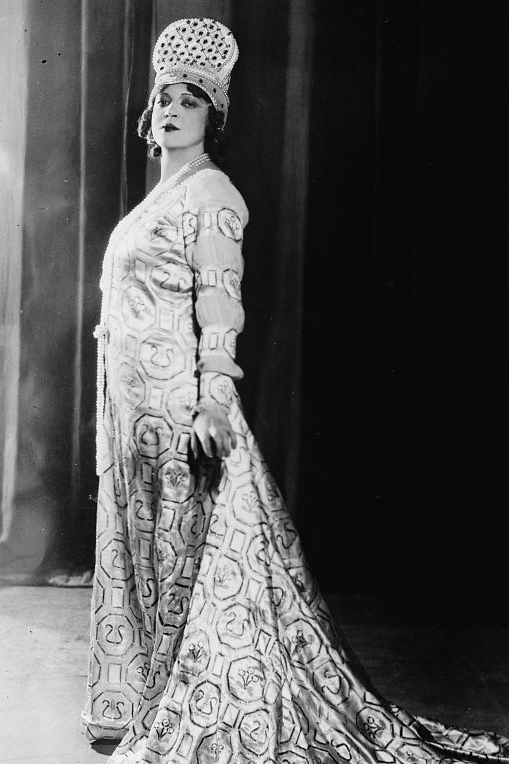
Ponselle as Princess Mathilde in Rossini's William Tell at the Met in 1923

Martin Bernheimer, writing in The New Grove Dictionary of Opera, had this to say about Ponselle's voice and recordings:

Ponselle's voice is generally regarded as one of the most beautiful of the century. She was universally lauded for opulence of tone, evenness of scale, breadth of range, perfection of technique and communicative warmth. Many of these attributes are convincingly documented on recordings. In 1954 she made a few private song recordings, later released commercially, revealing a still opulent voice of darkened timbre and more limited range.

Ponselle's recording career began with the acoustic horn, continued with electric recording, and ended on magnetic tape. Over her career, she made 166 commercial recordings (not including alternate takes), either in the studio or at Villa Pace. These are supplemented by live recordings from the 1930s, which include three complete operas and numerous songs and arias from her appearances on radio. Additionally, there are numerous "private" recordings made by Ponselle herself and others at the Villa Pace, from 1949 through the late 1970s.

=== Columbia recordings ===
Shortly before her Metropolitan Opera debut in 1918, Ponselle signed a 5-year contract with the Columbia Graphophone Company. Although Victor was the much more prestigious label, and the one for which Caruso recorded, Ponselle was advised by William Thorner and his assistant and accompanist, Romano Romani, to sign a contract with Columbia because she would become the company's leading soprano and not just one in a stable of great singers at Victor. Romani, a young composer whose opera Fedra had earned favorable attention in Italy, was conducting recording sessions for Columbia at the time. Under his baton, Ponselle made 44 discs for Columbia, including arias from many operas in which she never sang, such as Lohengrin, Tosca, La bohème, Madama Butterfly, and I vespri siciliani. Ponselle's Columbia recordings were all made by the acoustical process. Her 1923 recording of "Selva opaca" from William Tell was her personal favorite among all her acoustic recordings, because she felt that it was the most accurate representation of her voice and style at the time. Of particular interest among the Columbia discs are three duets she made with Carmela of some of their vaudeville hits, including a version of "Comin' Thro' the Rye" that features an elaborate coloratura cadenza that would not be out of place in Bellini's Norma but sounds a bit strange in the Scottish Highlands. One of Ponselle's regrets about signing with Columbia was that it deprived her of the opportunity to record with Caruso, who was an exclusive Victor artist.

=== Victor recordings ===
After Ponselle's contract with Columbia Records expired in 1923, she immediately signed with the Victor Talking Machine Company. Her Victor recordings from 1923 until mid-1925 are all acoustics; Victor began electrical recording in March 1925. Among her electrical Victor records, Ponselle's most admired titles include "Pace, pace mio Dio", "Suicidio!", "Casta diva", and the two arias from La vestale. She also recorded several ensembles, including the complete Tomb Scene from Aida with Giovanni Martinelli, "Mira, o Norma" with Marion Telva (the Adalgisa of her first Norma at the Met in 1927), and a trio from La forza del destino with Martinelli and Ezio Pinza. Ponselle made no studio recordings after 1939. In 1954, RCA Victor, unable to persuade Ponselle to return to the recording studio, took recording equipment to the Villa Pace and set up a microphone in the foyer. Ponselle, with piano accompaniment by conductor Igor Chichagov, recorded alternate versions of 53 songs, many of which were released on two LP discs, Rosa Ponselle Sings Today and Rosa Ponselle in Song. They show that Ponselle's voice remained in remarkably beautiful condition at age 57, with extraordinary richness and depth. "Not only in the richness of the sound and the trueness of the emotion," critic Irving Kolodin wrote in his review of the release of Ponselle's first RCA Victor LP, "but in the admirable discipline of what she has undertaken, the best in these performances of October 1954 mark the Ponselle of today as an artist to be reckoned with the fine singers of 1955."

=== Live recordings ===
During the 1930s, Ponselle sang often on the radio and she generally had her broadcasts recorded on 78 rpm Acetate discs. Many of these have been released since on LP and CD. There are five complete opera performances from the Metropolitan Opera radio broadcasts: Don Giovanni (1934), La traviata (1935), and three performances of Carmen (March 28, 1936 Boston, January 9, 1937, New York and April 17, 1937, Cleveland). The April 1937 Carmen is the Cleveland tour performance that was Ponselle's farewell to the operatic stage. The Traviata and Carmen performances are in good sound (for a mid-30s radio broadcast transcription); the Don Giovanni is in very poor sound. Ponselle's live recordings also include many songs and arias from her radio concerts. Finally, there are private recordings made at the Villa Pace of Ponselle singing various songs and arias accompanying herself on the piano, some of which she never recorded elsewhere. There is a particularly moving and very freely rendered performance of the aria "Senza mamma" from Suor Angelica.

=== Select LP Collections ===
- 1955 - Rosa Ponselle Sings Today (RCA Victor, LM-1889)
- 1957 - Rosa Ponselle in Song (RCA Victor, LM-2047)
- Rosa Ponselle Sings Verdi; Columbia-Odyssey Y-31150
- The Art Of Rosa Ponselle; RCA Camden CBL-100
- Rosa Ponselle as Norma and Other Famous Heroines; RCA Victrola VIC-1507
- Golden Age Il Trovatore; RCA Victrola VIC-1684

=== Compact discs ===
- 1982 - Verdi - La traviata (Pearl, GEMM 235) con Frederick Jagel and Lawrence Tibbett, Metropolitan Opera choir and orchestra conducted by Ettore Panizza (Recorded January 5, 1935)
- 1983 - Rosa Ponselle Live ..... in Concert 1934–1946 (MDP, MDP-012)
- 1989 - Ponselle (Nimbus Records, NI 7805)
- 1993 - Ponselle - Volume 2 (Nimbus Records, NI 7846)
- 1993 - Rosa Ponselle the Victor Recordings (1923–25) (Romophone, 81006-2)
- 1994 - The Spirit of Christmas Past (Various Artists) (Nimbus Records, NI 7861)
- 2000 - On The Air Volume 2 (Marston Records, 52032-2)
- Rosa Ponselle RCA Victor Vocal Series
- Rosa Ponselle: The Columbia Acoustic Recordings; Pearl
- Rosa Ponselle: The Victor Recordings 1925–29; Romophone
- Rosa Ponselle: The 1939 Victor and 1954 "Villa Pace" Recordings; Romophone
- Rosa Ponselle American Recordings Vols. 1, 2, 3, 4; Naxos Historical
- Rosa Ponselle American Recordings 1939, 1954; Naxos Historical
- Rosa Ponselle Sings Verdi 1918–1928; Naxos Historical
- Rosa Ponselle On the Air Volume 1 1934–36; Marston
- Rosa Ponselle: When I Have Sung my Songs 1922–1957; Biographies in Music, Cantabile

== Sources ==
- American Association of University Women, (Towson, Maryland, Branch), "Baltimore County Women, 1930–1975", (Baltimore: The Sunpapers, 1976) [The book is a collection of profiles of forty Baltimore County women "who distinguished themselves" in diverse fields (including artist Jane Frank and golfer Carol Mann), compiled as part of a project celebrating the 1976 United States Bicentennial ] OCLC 7441013
- Drake, James A., Rosa Ponselle: A Centenary Biography (Amadeus Press: Portland 1997) ISBN 0-385-15641-3
- Fitzgerald, Gerald ed., Annals of the Metropolitan Opera (G. K. Hall & Co.: Boston 1989) ISBN 0-8161-8903-X
- Jackson, Paul, "Saturday Afternoons at the Old Met: The Metropolitan Opera Matinee Broadcasts, 1931–1950" (Amadeus Press: Portland 1992)
- Phillips-Matz, Mary Jane, Rosa Ponselle: American Diva (Northeastern University Press: Boston 1997) ISBN 1-55553-317-5
- Ponselle, Rosa & Drake, James A., Rosa Ponselle: A Singer's Life (Doubleday & Sons: New York 1982) ISBN 0-385-15641-3
- Scott, Michael, The Record of Singing, Vol. 2 (Gerald Duckworth & Co., Ltd.: London 1979)
- Steane, J. B., The Grand Tradition (Amadeus Press: Portland, 1993) ISBN 0-684-13634-1
