= Paul Althouse =

American opera singer

Paul Shearer Althouse
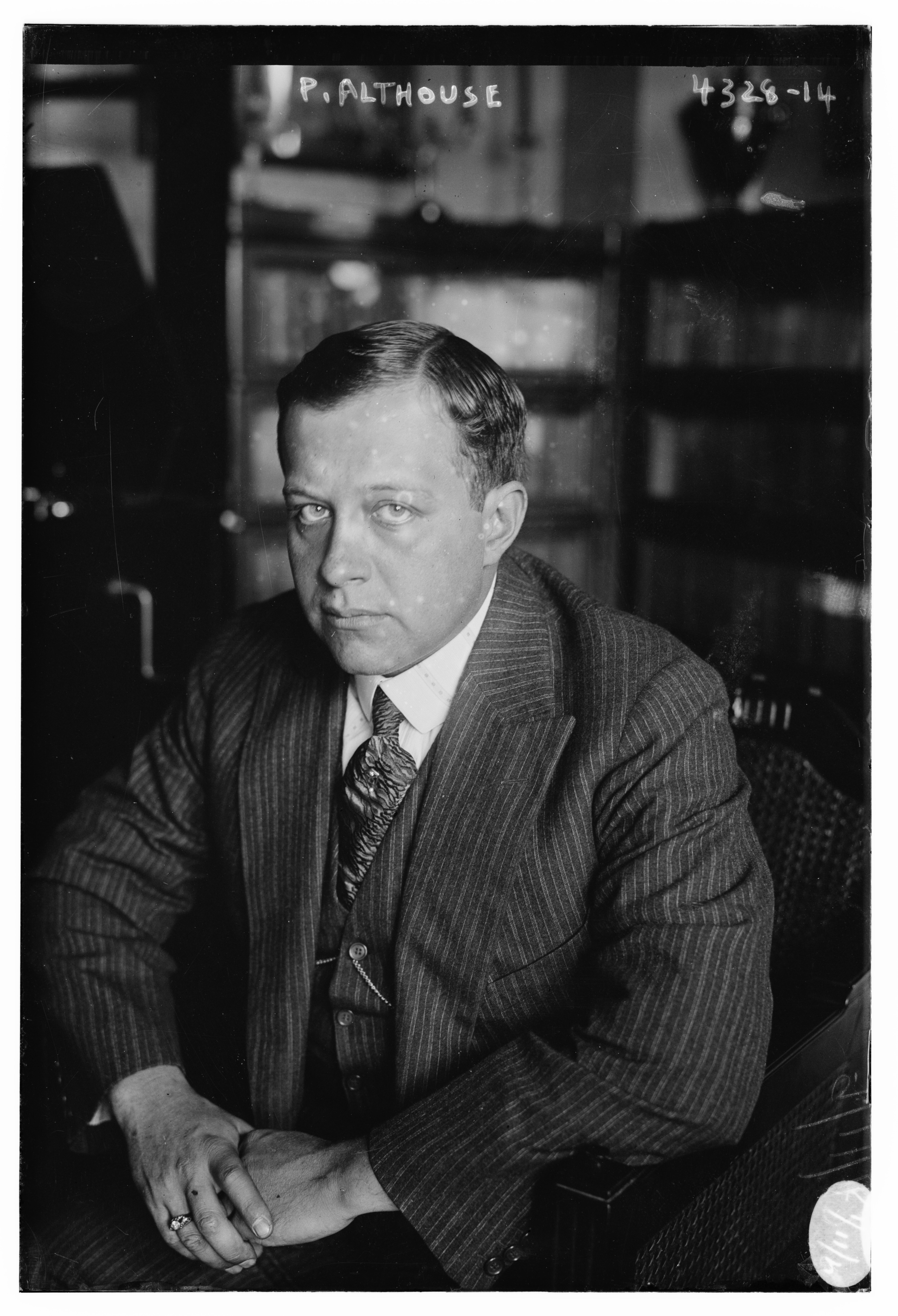
- Born: December 2, 1889; Reading, Pennsylvania
- Died: February 6, 1954 (aged 64); Manhattan, New York City
- Spouses: Elizabeth Breen (1896-1966); Cecilia Valentine Glynn (1915-2000)
- Parents: Harry Jacob Althouse (1871-1937); Laura May Shearer (1873-1942)

Paul Shearer Althouse (December 2, 1889 – February 6, 1954) was an American opera singer. He began his career as a lyric tenor with a robust Italianate sound, in roles including Cavaradossi in Tosca, Pinkerton in Madama Butterfly, and Turiddu in Cavalleria rusticana. He later branched out into the dramatic tenor repertoire, finding success in portraying Wagnerian heroes. He sang with the Metropolitan Opera in New York City for 30 years.

== Biography ==
He was born in Reading, Pennsylvania, on December 2, 1889, to Harry Jacob Althouse (1871-1937) and Laura May Shearer (1873-1942).

Althouse sang as a boy soprano in the choir of his hometown's Episcopal Church. He received his first voice lessons at the church from Evelyn Essick. He studied music at Bucknell University and then singing privately with Perley Dunn Aldrich in Philadelphia and Oscar Saenger and Percy Rector Stevens in New York City. He made his professional opera debut with the Philadelphia-Chicago Grand Opera Company as Gounod's Faust in an out of town engagement in New York City.

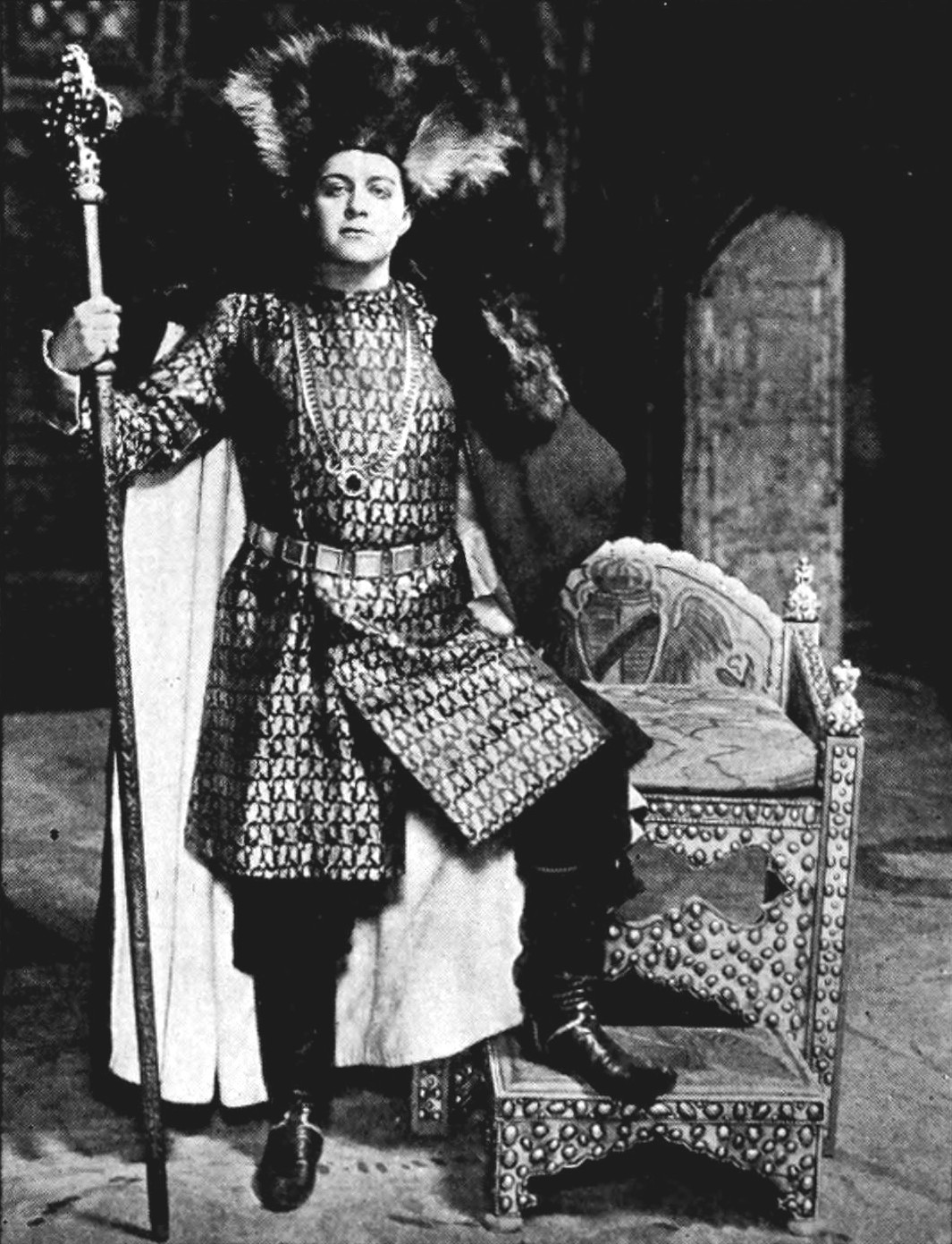
Althouse as Dimitri in Mussorgsky's Boris Godunov

Althouse debuted at the Metropolitan Opera in a small role in The Magic Flute on November 23, 1912. His first major assignment with that company came on March 19, 1913, as Grigory in the United States premiere of Mussorgsky's Boris Godunov under the baton of Arturo Toscanini. He was notably the first American tenor without European experience to sing at the Met.

He married Elizabeth Breen (1896–1966), known professionally as Zabetta Brenska, on June 18, 1914, in St. Paul, Minnesota; they had two daughters, and divorced in 1930. He remarried, to Klaire Shoup, in 1936.

Althouse remained at the Met through 1920, during which time he participated in the world premieres of Victor Herbert's Madeleine (François, 1914), Umberto Giordano’s Madame Sans-Gêne (Neipperg, 1915), Reginald de Koven's The Canterbury Pilgrims (Squire, 1917), Charles Wakefield Cadman’s Shanewis (Lionel, 1918) and Joseph Carl Breil’s The Legend (Stephen, 1919). His other roles at the house during these years included: Cavaradossi in Tosca, Froh in Das Rheingold, the Italian Singer in Der Rosenkavalier, Nicias in Thaïs, Pinkerton in Madama Butterfly, Turiddu in Cavalleria Rusticana, Uin-San-Lui in Franco Leoni's L'Oracolo, Walther in Tannhäuser, Vladimir in Prince Igor, and the title role in Oberon.

Althouse spent much of the 1920s dedicated to concert performances. After a five-year absence from opera, he appeared as Faust in San Francisco in 1925. He joined the roster of singers at the Philadelphia Civic Opera Company (PCOC) that year, making his debut with the company as Avito in L'amore dei tre re. He also sang Samson in Samson and Delilah and Don José in Carmen with the company that year. He visited the Bayreuth Festival in the summer of 1925, and decided he wanted to train as a Heldentenor. He toured New Zealand with Arthur Middleton in October 1925, subsequently making his first foray into the heavier repertoire at the PCOC as Tristan in Tristan und Isolde on March 25, 1926. He continued to perform with the PGOC annually through 1929 in such roles as Canio in Pagliacci, Pinkerton, Radamès in Aida, Siegmund in Die Walküre, and Walther von Stolzing in Die Meistersinger von Nürnberg.

In 1929 Althouse made his first appearances at major European opera houses, appearing at the Berlin State Opera, the Staatsoper Stuttgart, and the Royal Swedish Opera, mainly as Turiddu and as Canio. That same year he also performed in concerts with the Eaton Choral Society in Toronto. In 1930 he sang at the Chicago Civic Opera as Tannhauser and Siegmund. In 1931 he sang the title role in Stravinsky's Oedipus rex with the Philadelphia Orchestra under conductor Leopold Stokowski. He sang Tristan and Siegfried in concert with the orchestra the following year. In 1933, he sang Tristan in San Francisco.

After a thirteen-year absence, Althouse returned to the Met on February 26, 1933, for a special concert honoring Giulio Gatti-Casazza. He next appeared on stage as Siegmund in Die Walküre on February 3, 1934, with Frida Leider as Brünnhilde. He appeared annually at Met for the next six years, singing such roles as Aegisth in Elektra, Loge in Das Rheingold, Pinkerton, Tristan, Walther von Stolzing, and the title role in Lohengrin. Althouse made his last appearance at the Met during a Sunday Night Concert on February 18, 1940.

Althouse retired from the stage in 1945, after which he dedicated himself to teaching. Amongst his pupils were Richard Tucker, Eleanor Steber, Astrid Varnay, University of Southern California Voice Chair Margaret Schaper, Dean Verhines, and Léopold Simoneau.

He died on February 6, 1954, in Manhattan, New York City, and was buried in Ferncliff Cemetery and Mausoleum in Hartsdale, New York.
