= Camras =

Camras is a surname. Notable people with the surname include:

- Marvin Camras (1916–1995), American electrical engineer and inventor
- Carl B. Camras (1953–2009), American ophthalmologist
