= Roberto Moranzoni =

Italian conductor

Roberto Moranzoni (October 5, 1880, Bari - December 14, 1959, Milan) was an Italian conductor, principally of opera.

Moranzoni was a pupil of Pietro Mascagni and was selected by Mascagni to give his debut performances with the composer's Le maschere in 1901. Moranzoni was active internationally in the decade of the 1910s, directing the Boston Grand Opera from 1910 to 1917 and conducting in Paris and London. He conducted primarily from the Italian repertory at the Metropolitan Opera from 1917 to 1924, then was named conductor at the Chicago Civic Opera from 1924 to 1929.

Among his most noteworthy performances were the first run of Le maschere (following Mascagni's own first production), the inaugural British production of Italo Montemezzi's L'amore dei tre re (1914), the world premiere of Giacomo Puccini's Il trittico at the Metropolitan Opera in 1918, and the world premiere of Joseph Carl Breil's The Legend, also at the Metropolitan Opera, in 1920.
