= Graziella Pareto =

Spanish opera singer

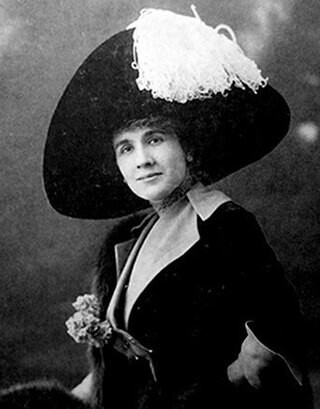
- Pareto circa 1920
- Born: Engràcia Pareto Homs; 15 May 1889; Barcelona, Spain
- Died: 1 September 1973 (aged 84); Rome, Italy

Engràcia Pareto Homs (6 May 1889 – 1 September 1973), better known as Graziella Pareto, was a Catalan soprano leggiero, one of the leading sopranos of the inter-war years. She is considered one of the great coloratura sopranos of the "Spanish School" of the early 20th century, alongside Maria Barrientos, Maria Galvany and Mercedes Capsir.

== Biography ==
Pareto was born in Barcelona, Spain. She studied in Milan, and made her stage debut in Barcelona, as Micaela in Carmen in 1906, and in Madrid, in 1908, as Amina in La sonnambula. She made her debut at La Scala, as Gilda from Rigoletto in 1914.

She appeared in Paris, London, Vienna, and St Petersburg, and had a long association with the Teatro Colón in Buenos Aires, where she sang from 1909 until 1927, also appearing with the Chicago Opera Company from 1921 to 1922. Her best roles included: Rosina, Norina, Lucia, Juliette, Ophélie, Leila, and Lakmé.

She retired to Naples, with her second husband, Dr Nando Arena (they wed on December 1, 1926). She had previously been briefly married to the composer Gabriele Sibella (they wed in August 1911). She died in Rome, Italy on 1 September 1973.

== Recordings ==
Pareto recorded for The Gramophone Company, Ltd. in Milan (1907-1908, 1918, 1924), in London (1920, 1924) and in Barcelona (1926) with excerpts from La Sonnambula, Lucia di Lammermoor, Rigoletto, Lakmè, Les pêcheurs de perles, Don Giovanni, La Traviata, Carmen, Don Pasquale, and various songs.

In 2022, Marston Records published "The Complete Graziella Pareto."
