= The Legend (opera) =

Opera by Joseph Carl Breil

- Opera by Joseph Carl Breil
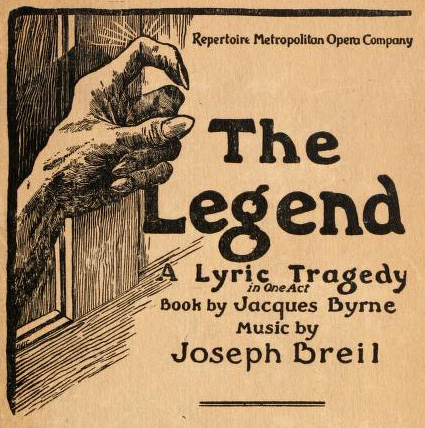
- Libretto cover, published in 1919 by Chappell & Co.
- Librettist: Jacques Byrne
- Language: English
- Premiere: 12 March 1919; Metropolitan Opera, New York

The Legend is a one-act tragic opera composed by Joseph Carl Breil to an English libretto by Jacques Byrne. It premiered at the Metropolitan Opera in New York City on March 12, 1919, in a triple bill with two other one-act operas, John Hugo's The Temple Dancer and Charles Cadman's Shanewis. Its melodramatic story is set in Muscovadia, a mythical country in the Balkans, and involves an impoverished nobleman turned bandit, his daughter Carmelita, and her lover Stephen, a captain in the hussars. The action unfolds over a single night at the end of which both lovers are dead—Stephen stabbed to death by Carmelita and Carmelita shot by Stephen's fellow hussars. The only one of Breil's six operas to be performed by a major opera company, The Legend received scathing press reviews and after its three performances at the Met disappeared from the repertory.

== Background and performance history ==
Although primarily known as a composer of silent film scores including those for D. W. Griffith's The Birth of a Nation (1915) and Intolerance (1916), Joseph Carl Breil had also written several short operas prior to The Legend. His Orlando of Milan was composed when he was 17 and given an amateur performance in Pittsburgh. Three comic operas were to follow later, Love Laughs at Locksmiths (performed in Portland, Maine, 1910); Professor Tattle (performed in New York City, 1913); and The Seventh Chord (performed in Chicago, 1913). He began composing The Legend, his first attempt at a serious opera, in 1916 and finished it a year later. He had originally written it for the American soprano Constance Balfour, who was living in Los Angeles at the time, and dedicated the work to her. His approach to the opera was influenced by his own film work and that of his librettist, Jacques Byrne, who wrote screenplays for early Hollywood films. Breil argued at the time that: "An opera libretto should be chockfull of action. Action, action all the time. The story should be simple and straightforward like a film play, only more so."

Shortly after becoming General Manager of the Metropolitan Opera in 1908, Giulio Gatti-Casazza had set a goal of producing at least one new English-language opera by an American composer each season. The Legend and Hugo's The Temple Dancer were chosen to premiere in the 1918/1919 season along with a revival of Cadman's Shanewis to form a triple bill. Four months earlier, the Met had staged the world premiere of Puccini's Il trittico (a triptych of three one-act Italian operas). Gatti-Casazza billed the Legend/Temple Dancer/Shanewis production as an "American Triptych". However, while all three operas were by American composers, only Shanewis had an American subject; The Legend is set in the Balkans and The Temple Dancer in India. The triple bill premiered at the Metropolitan Opera on March 12, 1919. All three works were conducted by Roberto Moranzoni and directed by Richard Ordynski. Norman Bel Geddes designed the sets and costumes for both The Legend and Shanewis. Rosa Ponselle, who had made her Met debut four months earlier in La forza del destino and the American tenor Paul Althouse, who had been singing at the Met since 1912, created the roles of the lovers, Carmelita and Stephen. Althouse also sang the leading male role in Shanewis later that evening.

The opening night reviews, especially for The Legend, were scathing. The New York Times critic James Gibbons Huneker described it as being "as heavy as unleavened dough". The critic in Theatre Magazine wrote: "Straight across the plank and into the sea of oblivion where it deserved to rest went The Legend." Its star, Rosa Ponselle, was openly contemptuous of the opera. When she was asked in an interview fifty years later if she had ever looked at the score again to see if her opinion had changed, she replied that she could not do so because she had burned it. The Legend had two more performances that season and then disappeared from the repertory completely.

== Roles ==
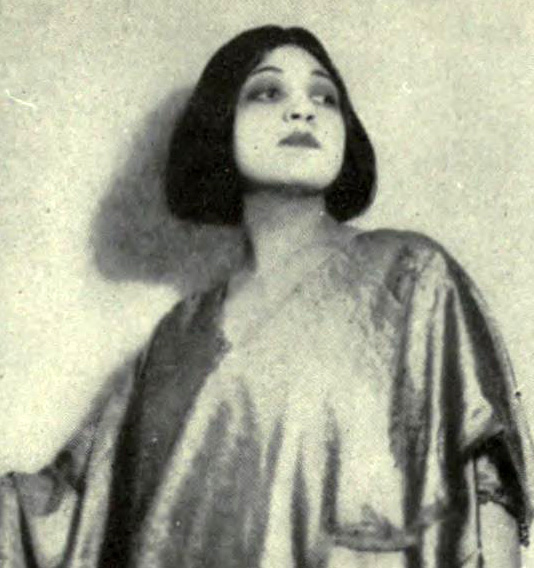
Rosa Ponselle who created the role of Carmelita

Role	Voice type	Premiere Cast, March 12, 1919 (Conductor: Roberto Moranzoni)
Count Stackareff, an impoverished nobleman and bandit	bass	Louis D'Angelo
Carmelita, Stackareff's daughter	soprano	Rosa Ponselle
Stephen Pauloff, a hussar captain and Carmelita's lover	tenor	Paul Althouse
Marta, Carmelita's servant	contralto	Kathleen Howard

The voice type for Carmelita is described more specifically in the printed libretto as dramatic soprano. Although the libretto specifies Stackareff as a bass role, it was sung in the premiere by a baritone. Similarly, the contralto role of Marta was sung by a mezzo-soprano. The role of Stephen Pauloff can also be sung by a high baritone.

== Synopsis ==
The opera is set in Muscovadia, a mythical country in the Balkans.

The action opens on a stormy night. Count Stackareff - an impoverished nobleman who leads a double life as the notorious bandit, "Black Lorenzo" - and his daughter, Carmelita are in their hunting lodge. Stackereff has kidnapped a wealthy merchant and is awaiting a messenger with the ransom. Carmelita is fearful that her lover, Stephen Pauloff, a captain in the hussars whom she had met in Vienna, will discover the true identity of her father and cast her off. Her servant, Marta, arrives with the news that Pauloff has been seen in the nearby woods. Carmelita is overjoyed, but Marta warns her that on that night the Evil One is said to stalk the area, knocking on doors. Whoever opens the door to him will die within a year. Carmelita asks Marta to tell her fortune with playing cards. The ace of spades (the "death card") comes up each time.

The storm worsens and there are two knocks at the door. Carmelita opens it but finds no one there. A little while later, Stephen arrives and tells Carmelita that he has been sent to capture "Black Lorenzo" dead or alive. Carmelita asks him to swear that he will never abandon her and the couple make plans to elope. Count Stackareff enters, and Stephen tells him of his mission. Realizing that he will soon be unmasked, Stackareff escapes through the window and runs into the woods. Stephen attempts to follow him, but is held back by Carmelita, who reminds him of his oath never to leave her. He breaks away to rush off after Stackereff, whereupon Carmelita stabs her lover to death. Two soldiers enter carrying the wounded Stackareff. When they discover that Carmelita has murdered their captain, they level their muskets at her. The curtain falls, and shots are heard as the opera's finale is played.

== Sources ==
- Breil, Joseph; Byrne, Jacques (1919). The Legend: A lyric tragedy in one act. New York: Chappell.
- Hipsher, Edward Ellsworth (1927). American Opera and Its Composers: A Complete History of Serious American Opera, with a Summary of the Lighter Forms Which Led up to Its Birth. Philadelphia: Theodore Presser. LCCN 35002381. OCLC 1334654200.
- Huneker, James Gibbons (March 13, 1919). "Opera: A Triple Bill at the Metropolitan" (PDF). The New York Times.
- Key, Pierre V. R. (May 1919). "Music and Musicians: New Operas at the Metropolitan". Theatre Magazine. Vol. 29, no. 219. New York. p. 268.
- Kirk, Elise K. (2001). American Opera. Urbana: University of Illinois Press. ISBN 0-252-02623-3.
- Metropolitan Opera Archives. The Legend. MetOpera Database
- New York Times. "New American Operas, March 12". (March 3, 1919)
- New York Times. New Native Operas Foreign in Scene". (March 9, 1919)
- Phillips-Matz, Mary Jane (1997). Rosa Ponselle: American Diva. Boston: Northeastern University Press. ISBN 1-55553-317-5.
- Ponselle, Rosa; Drake, James A. (1982). Ponselle, A Singer's Life. Garden City, N.Y.: Doubleday. ISBN 0-385-15641-3.
- Sanchez, Nellie Van de Grift. California and Californians, Volume 4. Lewis (1930)
