= Zabetta Brenska =

American singer

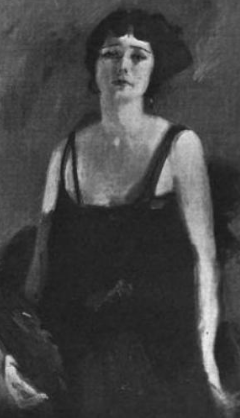
- A portrait of Zabetta Brenska by Lillian Fisk (1884-1970), from a 1917 publication.
- Born: Elizabeth Breen; March 1, 1896; St. Paul, Minnesota, U.S.
- Died: December 26, 1966 (aged 70); New York City, U.S.
- Other names: Elizabeth Breen Althouse, Elizabeth Breen Timm (after marriage)
- Occupation: Singer

Zabetta Brenska (March 1, 1896 – December 26, 1966), born Elizabeth Breen, was an American singer.

== Early life ==
Elizabeth Breen was born in St. Paul, Minnesota, the daughter of Thomas M. Breen and Rachel Ann Eastwood Breen. Her paternal grandparents Matthias and Elizabeth Breen were born in Ireland. She received musical training in Florence.

== Career ==
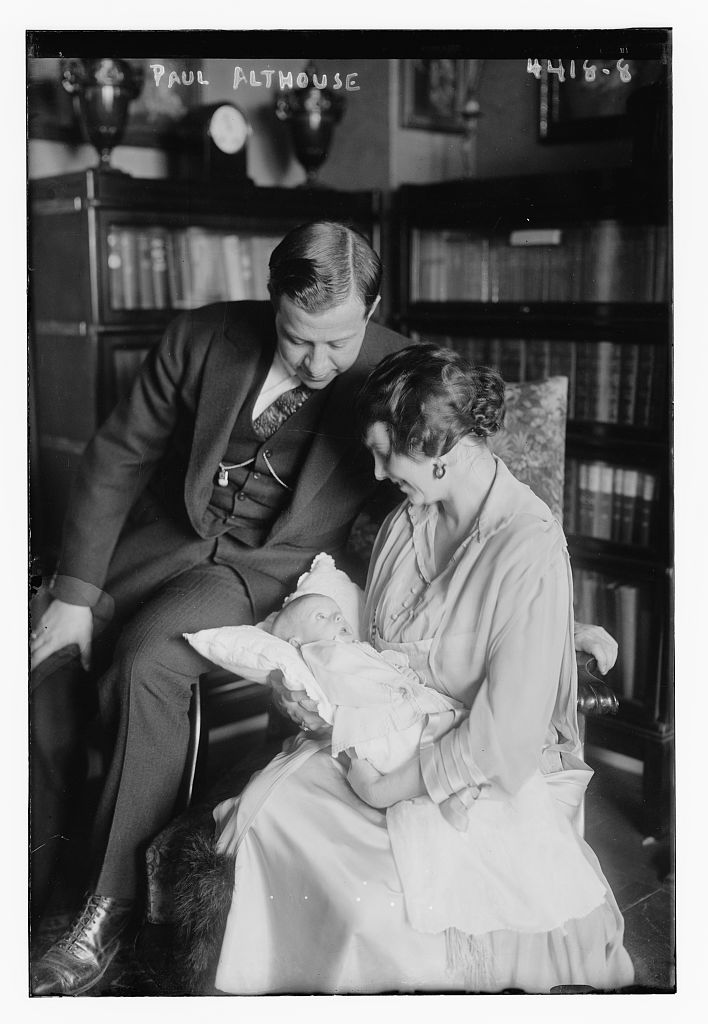
Paul Althouse and Zabetta Brenska with one of their daughters, from a news service photograph in the collection of the Library of Congress.

Brenska, who sang as a mezzo-soprano or contralto, gave recitals and concerts, sometimes sharing the stage with her first husband, Paul Althouse. She also assisted Althouse with his operatic career, organizing and hand-copying his music and translations. "It was one of our little 'pacts' that after our wedding I should be allowed to work at my music," she explained to an interviewer in 1917. She expressed admiration for the songs of Black composer Harry T. Burleigh.

After her second marriage, she lived in the Ringoes section of East Amwell Township, New Jersey and directed community theatre productions and wartime benefit shows there. She also taught Red Cross first aid classes.

== Personal life ==
Elizabeth Breen married opera singer Paul Shearer Althouse in 1914; they had daughters Rita Mary (born 1917) and Pauline (born 1919), before they separated in the 1920s and divorced in 1930. She married again in 1932, to physician Alexander Berthold Timm, a widower with two children, Alexander (born 1913) and Renee. She died in 1966, aged 70 years, in New York City.
