= Canberra Academy of Music and Related Arts =

Australian community organization

The Canberra Academy of Music and Related Arts was a community organization dedicated to performance and training in music and theatre for the community of Canberra, Australia.

Founded in 1997, CAMRA was wound up early 2015, with the partial retirement of its artistic directors, Colin Forbes and Patricia Whitbread.

== Patron ==
CAMRA was honoured to have distinguished counter-tenor Mr Tobias Cole as its Patron.

== Musical theatre and opera ==
WS Gilbert and A Sullivan's Iolanthe was CAMRA's first full theatrical production in November 2000, followed by Patience in 2001, The Mikado in August / September 2002 and The Sorcerer in November 2004 and April 2005. CAMRA'S production of John Gay's The Beggar's Opera in August / September 2003 won the 2003 Canberra Critics' Circle Award.

In August 2007, in its 10th anniversary year, CAMRA presented four sell-out performances of Mozart's opera the Marriage of Figaro and in November 2008, performed concert highlights from his Cosi fan tutte. In 2009 local group Classical Opera-tives was assisted in highlights from La Clemenza di Tito and the two groups jointly produced a show of arias and scenes from Mozart's Don Giovanni and The Magic Flute later that year.

English tenor Stephen Anthony Brown, formerly of the D'Oyly Carte Opera Company, visited Canberra in October 2009 to present masterclasses, workshops and concerts for CAMRA, Inc. including a Polish up your G & S ! workshop on 23–25 October and, on 27 October, Five Knights and a Gondola a recital by Stephen Anthony Brown and Colin Forbes of songs by Sir Arthur Sullivan and his contemporaries.

== Sacred music ==
CAMRA sang sacred music in performance and as music for special church services in association with St Philip's Anglican Church, O'Connor. Works sung included Bach's Johannes Passion, Haydn's Little Organ Mass and Nicolai Mass, Benjamin Britten's Ceremony of Carols, Giovanni Battista Pergolesi's Stabat Mater, Mozart's Mass in F and Schubert's Mass in G.

Hildegard of Bingen's Ordo Virtutum was presented in September 2005 and June 2008 in an original English translation, and Handel's Messiah in December 2005, 2006 and 2007. Bach's St John Passion was again performed in 2010, in conjunction with chamber choir Igitur Nos.

== Recitals ==
Recitals were presented in most years of CAMRA's life, especially of singers accompanied by piano or works for solo piano. CAMRA was launched with a complete cycle of Mozart's piano sonatas performed on fortepiano by Colin Forbes, in five concerts from July 1998 to July 2000. In March 2013 CAMRA presented Music of Leoš Janáček, featuring The Diary of One Who Disappeared, (JW V/12, 1917–19), with Kent McIntosh, tenor, accompanied by Colin Forbes, piano. In 2012, Colin Forbes commence a cycle of the Beethoven piano sonatas, which is continuing with one or two concerts each year.

== Directors ==
CAMRA was established by Colin Forbes and Patricia Whitbread who were the musical and artistic directors. On graduating from the Sydney Conservatorium of Music, Colin Forbes became Lecturer in Piano at the Conservatorium as well as pianist and percussionist with the Sydney Symphony Orchestra. He later joined Opera Australia as a repetiteur and has also worked with other leading concert organizations including the Australian Chamber Orchestra, Synergy and the Australia Ensemble. A study tour of Germany took Colin to the Folkwang Hochschule in Essen to study piano with Paul Badura-Skoda. Colin subsequently taught and performed in Germany. On returning to Australia he became Head of Keyboard at Ascham School in Sydney, later moving to Canberra in 1992 to take up the position of repetiteur at the Canberra School of Music. Colin gave sonata recitals with violinist Erich Binder (Concert Master of the Vienna Philharmonic Orchestra) on both of his visits to Australia. In 1997 Colin helped to establish CAMRA, of which he was Artistic Director and principal piano teacher.

Patricia Whitbread studied singing with Alice Mallon-Muir in Perth, Western Australia. She was successful in many competitions, including the Australian Broadcasting Corporation's Instrumental and Vocal (State and Commonwealth Finalist), and the Metropolitan Opera Auditions (Commonwealth Finalist, regional winner in Hawaii in 1974, and Australian representative at the finals in New York). In these early years, she performed principal roles with the West Australian Opera and the Victorian State Opera (now part of Opera Australia). Patricia was a trainee principal with Opera Australia in 1975 and 1976, and was awarded an Opera Foundation Scholarship to study in West Germany (1977). From 1978-1980, she was a principal singer with Opera Australia, and returned to West Germany to perform and teach from 1980-84. On returning to Australia, Patricia taught and performed extensively in Sydney and Canberra. She has been President of the ACT Chapter of the Australian National Association of Teachers of Singing.
