= Romophone =

UK record label

- Founded: 1993
- Founder: Louise Barder and Virginia Barder
- Defunct: 2003
- Status: Defunct
- Genre: Opera
- Country of origin: United Kingdom

Romophone was a record label specializing in the restoration and reissue of historic 78 rpm recordings of singers from the "Golden Age" of opera on compact disc. Romophone was founded in the United Kingdom in 1993 by Louse Barder and Virginia Barder.

Romophone CDs characteristically present the complete recording output of a singer on a particular label in chronological order. Romophone has been praised for the accuracy and faithfulness of the material it presents, both discographic and musical. The CD liner notes include biographical material about the singers and photographs (often rare and previously unpublished). Libretti and lyrics are not included in the liner notes.

Among the singers whose recordings have been reissued on the Romophone label, include Frances Alda, Lucrezia Bori, Edmond Clément, Léon David, Emma Calvé, Emmy Destinn, Emma Eames, Kirsten Flagstad, Amelita Galli-Curci, Mary Garden, Beniamino Gigli, Lotte Lehmann, Giovanni Martinelli, Edith Mason, John McCormack, Nellie Melba, Claudia Muzio, Pol Plançon, Rosa Ponselle, Elisabeth Rethberg, Tito Schipa, Elisabeth Schumann, Ernestine Schumann-Heink, Luisa Tetrazzini, Marcella Sembrich, Mattia Battistini, Mario Ancona and Leonard Warren among others. Two complete opera recordings from La Scala – Il Trovatore (1930) and Madama Butterfly (1929/30) – are in the catalogue, as well as collections including Wagner en Français, America the Beautiful, The Century's Greatest Singers in Puccini and Christmas From a Golden Age.

Romophone won a Gramophone Award for Best Historical Recording in 1996, for a volume of recordings by Lucrezia Bori, remastered by Ward Marston.

The Romophone label was retired around 2003 after its catalog of recordings was acquired by Naxos.

== See also ==
- Lists of record labels
