= Homeland Security Centers of Excellence =

Homeland Security Centers of Excellence (HS-Centers) develops technology and training for police and domestic military units, and are sponsored by the U.S. Department of Homeland Security. The Centers were created under the Homeland Security Act in 2002 in order to establish a coordinated, university-based system to increase domestic security measures.

== Current Centers ==
The Center of Excellence network includes twelve Centers, ten of which are active.

=== The Arctic Domain Awareness Center (ADAC) ===
The Arctic Domain Awareness Center (ADAC), led by the University of Alaska Anchorage, develops products and educational programs related to security in the Arctic maritime environment.

=== The Center for Visualization and Data Analytics (CVADA) ===
The Center for Visualization and Data Analytics (CVADA), co-led by Purdue University (visualization sciences-VACCINE) and Rutgers University (data sciences-CCICADA), researches data mining for security purposes.

=== The Center of Excellence for Awareness & Localization of Explosives-Related Threats (ALERT) ===
The Center of Excellence for Awareness & Localization of Explosives-Related Threats (ALERT), led by Northeastern University, pursues explosives-related research.

=== The Center of Excellence for Zoonotic and Animal Disease Defense (ZADD) ===
The Center of Excellence for Zoonotic and Animal Disease Defense (ZADD), co-led by Texas A&M University and Kansas State University, researches animal disease threats.

=== The Coastal Hazards Center of Excellence (CHC) ===
The Coastal Hazards Center of Excellence (CHC), co-led by the University of North Carolina at Chapel Hill and Jackson State University, performs research and develops education programs to improve safeguards from catastrophic natural disasters.

=== The Maritime Security Center (MSC) ===
The Maritime Security Center (MSC), led by Stevens Institute of Technology, develops strategies to support Marine Transportation system resilience and educational programs.

=== The National Center for Border Security and Immigration (NCBSI) ===
The National Center for Border Security and Immigration (NCBSI), co-led by the University of Arizona, Tucson and the University of Texas at El Paso, develops products related to immigration, economics, and border security.

=== The National Center for Food Protection and Defense (NCFPD) ===
The National Center for Food Protection and Defense (NCFPD), led by the University of Minnesota, researches the safety and security of the domestic food supply chain.

=== The National Center for Risk and Economic Analysis of Terrorism Events (CREATE) ===
The National Center for Risk and Economic Analysis of Terrorism Events (CREATE), led by the University of Southern California, researches the economic implications of terrorism and security countermeasures.

=== The National Counterterrorism Innovation, Technology, and Education Center (NCITE) ===
The National Counterterrorism Innovation, Technology, and Education Center (NCITE), led by the University of Nebraska Omaha, does research to counter and prevent terrorism and targeted violence.

=== Emeritus Centers ===
- The Center for Maritime, Island and Remote and Extreme Environment Security (MIREES), co-led by the University of Hawaii and the Stevens Institute of Technology, focuses on developing research and education programs for subarctic maritime security.
- The National Center for the Study of Preparedness and Catastrophic Event Response (PACER), led by Johns Hopkins University, optimizes the Nation’s medical and public health preparedness, mitigation, and recovery strategies.
- The National Transportation Security Center of Excellence (NTSCOE), co-led by the University of Connecticut, Tougaloo College, and Texas Southern University, is a seven-institution consortium focused on developing products to increase the resilience of the Nation’s multi-modal transportation infrastructure.
- The Center for Advancing Microbial Risk Assessment (CAMRA), co-led by Michigan State University and Drexel University and established jointly with the U.S. Environmental Protection Agency, researches threats from microbial hazards.
- The National Consortium for the Study of Terrorism and Responses to Terrorism (START), led by the University of Maryland, focuses on disrupting terrorist groups and improving the resilience of the general population in the event of terrorist attacks.

== See also ==
- Defense Advanced Research Projects Agency
- War on terrorism
- Surveillance
