= Carl B. Camras =

American ophthalmologist

- Born: November 23, 1953; Glencoe, Illinois
- Died: April 14, 2009 (aged 55)
- Education: Yale University, Columbia University, UCLA School of Medicine
- Known for: Development of the prostaglandin analogues for the treatment of glaucoma
- Medical career
- Profession: Ophthalmologist, Chairman UNMC Department of Ophthalmology and Visual Sciences
- Institutions: University of Nebraska Medical Center
- Research: Glaucoma

Carl B. Camras (November 23, 1953 – April 14, 2009) was an American ophthalmologist known for his research on the treatment of glaucoma. He codeveloped latanoprost sold under the trade name Xalatan, which is the most widely used glaucoma medication.

== Biography ==
Carl Camras grew up in Chicago, Illinois. He was the son of the engineer and inventor Marvin Camras who held over 550 patents. His father invented magnetic recording which was later used on VCR tapes and computer disks.

== Undergraduate work ==
As a molecular biophysics and biochemistry major at Yale University, Camras first conceived the idea that low doses of prostaglandins could be effective in lowering intraocular pressure in glaucoma.

== Medical school ==
In medical school at Columbia University, Camras sought out a research adviser who would work with him on his project. After many rejections, he partnered with a renowned researcher-novelist Dr. László Z. Bitó who agreed to work with him on the project. Together with the help of Johan Stjernschantz at Pharmacia, the three developed the prostaglandin analogue, latanoprost, which remains the leading treatment in glaucoma therapy.
