= Marvin Camras =

American electrical engineer and inventor (1916–1995)

- Born: January 1, 1916; Chicago
- Died: June 23, 1995 (aged 79); Evanston, Illinois
- Education: Illinois Institute of Technology
- Spouse: Isabelle Pollak Camras
- Children: Robert A. Camras, Carl B. Camras, Louis E. of Camras, and Michael D. Camras, and Ruth Camras Pikler
- Engineering career
- Discipline: Electrical engineer
- Significant design: Wire recorder, multi-track tape recording
- Awards: National Medal of Technology, 1990

Marvin Camras (January 1, 1916 – June 23, 1995) was an electrical engineer and inventor who was widely influential in the field of magnetic recording.

Camras built his first recording device, a wire recorder, in the 1930s for a cousin who was an aspiring opera singer named Willy. He also built Willy a telephone, because he could not afford one, at the age of 8. Shortly afterwards he discovered that using magnetic tape made the process of splicing and storing recordings easier.

Camras's work attracted the notice of his professors at what became Illinois Institute of Technology (IIT) and was offered a position at Armour Research Foundation (which merged with Lewis Institute in 1940 to become IIT) to develop his work.

Before and during World War II Camras' wire recorders were used by the armed forces to train pilots. They were also used for disinformation purposes: battle sounds were recorded and amplified and the recordings placed where the D-Day invasion was not going to take place. This work was kept secret until after the war.

In June 1944 he was awarded U.S. patent 2,351,004, titled "Method and Means of Magnetic Recording". In all, Camras received more than 500 patents, largely in the field of electronic communications.

Camras received a bachelor's degree in 1940 and a master's degree in 1942, both in electrical engineering, from IIT. In 1968, the institution awarded him an honorary doctorate.

In May 1962 Camras wrote a speculative prediction paper titled "Magnetic recording and reproduction - 2012 A.D.". In his paper Camras predicted the existence of mass-produced portable media players he described as memory packs the size of a package of playing cards holding up to 10^{20} bits of information. Such devices would not have any mechanical moving parts and would store both sound and movies. He also predicted music and movie downloads, online shopping, access to online encyclopedias and newspapers and the widespread use of online banking transactions.

Camras built his own house by hand, doing everything except laying the foundation. He also built a bomb shelter in this house. In recognition of his achievements, he received the National Medal of Technology award in 1990.

Marvin Camras died of kidney failure at the age of 79 in Evanston, Illinois.

== See also ==
- Tape bias
