= Ward Marston =

American producer and audio engineer (born 1952)

- Ward Marston
- Born: 22 May 1952 (age 72); Philadelphia, Pennsylvania, U.S.
- Occupation: Audio transfer engineer

Henry Ward Marston IV (born 22 May 1952) is an American audio transfer engineer and producer, known for the conservation and reissue of historical recordings.

== Early life ==
Henry Ward Marston IV, was born in Philadelphia. Blind from birth he began playing the piano at the age of four and, from 1956 to 1964, attended the Overbrook School for the Blind. He was a student of Williams College until 1973, later receiving the Williams College Bicentennial Medal for distinguished achievement in 2005. Throughout this period Marston continued his training in both piano and also the organ, including a period of advanced organ studies with Pierre Cochereau in France during the summer of 1967. In that year also Marston also formed his own jazz group and has subsequently appeared at the Café Carlyle, filling in for Bobby Short, and also at the Spoleto Festival in Charleston, South Carolina.

== Conservation of recordings ==
Marston's introduction to early recordings began when he was five, a chance encounter of finding a group of old records and a record player in a relative’s basement: "They put on an old Caruso recording for me – it was called 'Hosanna' and it was by a forgotten composer named Granier – and I asked them to play it over and over again. I was fascinated by the tune, by the singing, the sheer sense of history I felt when I was listening to the record." In 1961, his parents took him to a performance of Puccini's Turandot conducted by Leopold Stokowski at the Metropolitan Opera in New York. This performance was to cement his interest in music and thereafter Marston spent his spare time looking for discounted 78 rpm records in Philadelphia record shops. Marston had already built a substantial library of historic recordings at the time he entered Williams College and he used his collection to broadcast on the college radio station WCFM. Dissatisfied with many commercial transfers of early and historic recordings he began producing transfers for broadcasting which lead in 1976 to Columbia Masterworks engaging Marston to prepare an edition of some early Budapest String Quartet recordings. Other commissions followed and in 1979 his restoration work on the experimental Bell Laboratories Wide Range and Stereophonic recordings of Leopold Stokowski and the Philadelphia Orchestra, made in 1931 and 1932, lead him to being acknowledged as one of the world's leading transfer engineers.

A significant body Marston's conservation and reissue work has been issued through several labels including Andante, Biddulph, Naxos, Pearl, RCA/BMG, Romophone, and from 1997 on his own label Marston Records.

Among Marston's noted achievements are a collection devoted to the Victor recordings of Fritz Kreisler, released by RCA in 1995 which received a nomination in the category of Grammy Award for Best Historical Album, the Franklin Mint Toscanini Collection, RCA’s complete Sergei Rachmaninoff, the Philadelphia Orchestra Centennial Collection, the complete recordings of Josef Hofmann, The Rubinstein Collection for RCA Red Seal garnering a second Grammy Award nomination in 2001; and the complete recordings of Enrico Caruso for the Pearl and Naxos labels.

His own record label was formed in order to reissue recordings by performers neglected by the major record companies. These have included an ongoing series devoted to the acoustically recorded complete operas on Pathé; the Julius Block collection, a three-CD collection of rare, privately-made cylinder recordings featuring some of the most important musical personalities of the late 19th and early 20th centuries; The Edison Legacy containing unpublished recordings from the Edison Archive; the complete recordings of Feodor Chaliapin; and the completion in 2019 of the complete recordings of tenor John McCormack, a project that begun in 1995 on the Romophone label with subsequent issues on Naxos and Marston's own label.
