= César Vezzani =

French opera singer

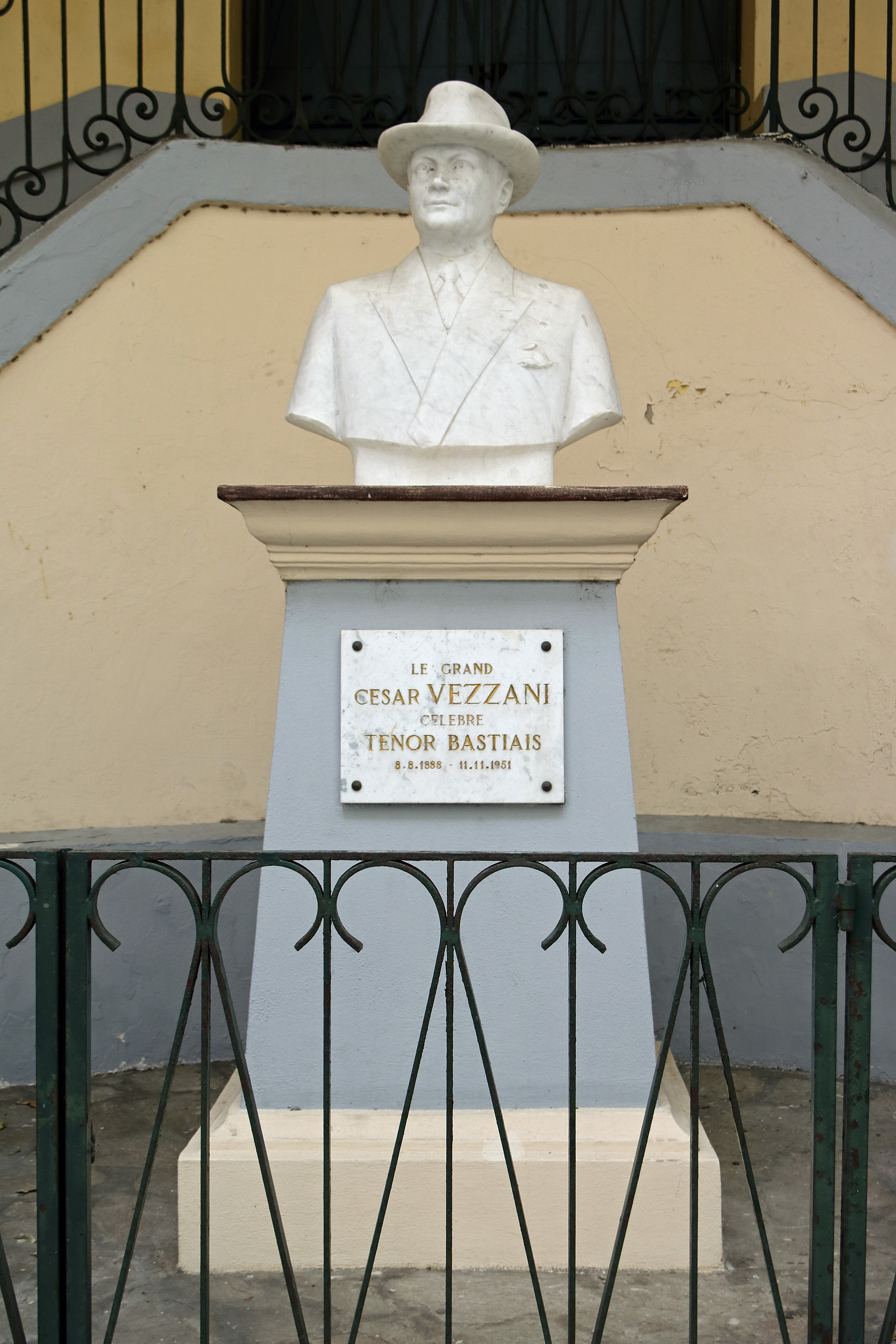
BASTIA - Bust of César Vezzani - National School of Music, rue César Campinchi

César Vezzani (8 August 1888 – 11 November 1951) was a French/Corsican operatic tenor who became a leading exponent of French grand opera through several decades. (Some sources give his date of birth as 1886.)

== Career ==
César Vezzani was born in Bastia in Corsica; his father died shortly before his birth. Soon after 1900, his family moved to Toulon on the French mainland, but little is known about his early musical training. In 1908, he went to Paris to study singing and was taught by the Corsican soprano Agnès Borgo (1879 - 1958). He then made his operatic début at the Opéra-Comique in 1911 in the title-role of Richard Coeur-de-Lion by Grétry. He continued singing there in such works as Dinorah by Meyerbeer and Erlanger's La sorcière, as well as Italian operas such as Tosca and Cavalleria Rusticana.

In 1913, Vezzani and Agnès Borgo were married, and they had one daughter.(They later divorced in 1919, and Vezzani had two subsequent marriages.) Vezzani and Borgo were contracted to sing in the USA (including Boston) in 1914/1915 but were prevented by the outbreak of the First World War. Vezzani was called up and was wounded in action He resumed his singing career during the later years of the war, but most of his subsequent engagements were in provincial opera houses, especially in the south of France, though he also sang in Brussels. He returned to the Opéra-Comique in Paris in 1921/1922 and probably appeared there again during the 1920s, but he never sang at the Paris Opéra. The ringing and heroic quality of his voice made him an ideal choice for certain heavy and dramatic tenor parts, but he never abandoned some of the more lyrical roles of the French repertoire.

During World War II, Vezzani spent time in North Africa, singing frequently in Algiers. He continued as principal tenor in Toulon until 1948 when he suffered a stroke which left him paralyzed. He returned to Bastia, but now without an income he spent the last three years of his life in some poverty and assisted by the generosity of friends. He died in hospital in Marseille and was buried in Bastia, where a street is named after him.

== Recordings ==
The potential of Vezzani's outstanding voice for recording was quickly recognised, and from 1912 to 1914 he made a series of recordings for French Odéon, including excerpts from Pagliacci. Tosca, and Werther. Then from 1923 until the early 1930s he recorded for French La Voix de son maître in arias from many of his favourite roles, including Reyer's Sigurd, Halévy's La Juive, and Meyerbeer's L'Africaine. There was also a complete recording of Gounod's Faust in 1930 with Mireille Berthon and Marcel Journet. It is unclear whether and when Vezzani sang Wagner on stage, but he recorded a number of pieces from Lohengrin and The Ring. In total he recorded over 170 sides. Most of these were originally released only in France, but there have been several selections transferred to CD, and a systematic reissue of his recordings has been launched by Marston Records.

== Reputation ==
Critics have shown universal recognition of the exceptional quality of Vezzani's voice, though they have sometimes expressed reservations about the subtlety of his approach, which was generally robust.

His recording of Faust has occasioned the following comments: "Vezzani is a noble representative of that vanished breed, the French spinto tenor... Unforced lyricism was not Vezzani's greatest strength... [but] where ringing excitement is called for, his only equals are Caruso and, more recently, Franco Corelli." Referring to his recording of excerpts from Roméo et Juliette, another critic has said: "He was a real ténor de force and still singing well at sixty. There is little nuance here, but the voice is healthy and brilliant, somehow typically Corsican." Reflecting on the fact that Vezzani's career did not take him to the world's major opera houses, another has said: "He seems to be one of those whose gifts exceeded his attainments." The generous attention that he received from recording companies allows later generations to form their own judgments.
