= Irina Lungu =

Russian operatic soprano (born 1980)

- Born: 5 June 1980 (age 46); Orhei, Moldavian Soviet Socialist Republic
- Citizenship: Russian
- Education: Voronezh State Institute of Arts, Russia
- Occupation: Operatic soprano

Irina Vyacheslavovna Lungu (Russian: Ирина Вячеславовна Лунгу; born 5 June 1980) is a Russian operatic soprano. She won the CulturArte Prize at the 2004 Operalia competition and has since performed internationally.

== Early life and career ==
Born in the Moldavian Soviet Socialist Republic and raised in Russia, Lungu obtained diplomas in choral conducting, piano and singing at the Voronezh State Institute of Arts in Russia, where her voice teacher was Mikhail Podkopaev. She won several international competitions, including Operalia in 2004, the International Hans Gabor Belvedere Singing Competition, and Voci Verdiane in Busseto, before being accepted in 2003 by the Accademia del Teatro alla Scala, Milan, where she was mentored by, among others, soprano Leyla Gencer.

== International career ==
In that same year (2003) Riccardo Muti selected Lungu as Anaï in Rossini's Moïse et Pharaon, the opening opera of the 2003/04 season of the Teatro alla Scala. That was the beginning of a collaboration between Lungu and La Scala, where she has performed Adina in L'elisir d'amore, Maria Stuarda, Marguerite in Faust, Oksana in Cherevichki, Nannetta in Falstaff and the title role of Sancta Susanna. It was at La Scala that in 2007 she debuted the role of Violetta in La traviata under the musical direction of Lorin Maazel in Liliana Cavani's production, returning to sing the role in the same staging in 2008, and in 2013 in Dmitri Tcherniakov's new production conducted by Daniele Gatti. Violetta is her most performed role (over 130 times).

In 2013 Lungu made her Metropolitan Opera debut as Gilda in Verdi's Rigoletto opposite her fellow countryman baritone Dmitri Hvorostovsky. Anthony Tommasini praised her performance in The New York Times, describing her as "a first class Gilda" with "bloom and warmth" in her voice. She returned to the Met later in January 2014 for five performances as Musetta in Puccini's La bohème.

Other highlights of her career include: Gilda in Rigoletto at the Opéra National de Paris and at the Teatro dell'Opera of Rome, Liù in Turandot at the Bavarian State Opera, Musetta in La bohème at the Royal Opera House in London, Donna Anna in Don Giovanni at Arena of Verona and at the La Quincena Festival of San Sebastian, Micaëla in Carmen at the Teatro Regio in Turin and the Arena of Verona, Marguerite in Faust at La Monnaie of Brussels and in Turin, Juliette in Roméo et Juliette at the Arena of Verona, Mimì in La bohème at the Kolobov Novaya Opera Theatre in Moscow, as well as her debut at the Bolshoi Theatre of Moscow in a gala concert in memory of Russian mezzo-soprano Elena Obraztsova.

On 12 October 2016, Lungu inaugurated the 2016/17 season of the Teatro Regio Turin as Mimì in a new production of La bohème.

In the 2017/18 season she made her debut as Corinna in Rossini's Il viaggio a Reims in a new production at the Gran Teatre del Liceu in Barcelona, reprised the title role of La traviata at the Bolshoi Theatre in Moscow, at the New National Theatre Tokyo, in Seoul and at the Vienna State Opera, where she als performed Donna Anna in Don Giovanni. In Prague she interpreted the role of Donna Anna at the Estates Theatre, where the opera was first performed exactly 230 years before, celebrating the 230th anniversary of Mozart's masterpiece, conducted by Plácido Domingo. The performances were recorded and published on DVD/Blu-ray by CMajor Entertainment. Other performances in 2017/18 include her role debut as Manon (Massenet) in Bilbao and her Australian debut as Gilda in Rigoletto at the Sydney Opera House. Engagements in 2018/19 include her return to the Royal Opera House, London, as Marguerite in Faust, her role debut as Elettra in Idomeneo at the Vienna State Opera where she also sang Norina in Don Pasquale, Lucia di Lammermoor in Tenerife, Marguerite in Faust at the Teatro Real in Madrid and La traviata in Hamburg.

== Recordings ==
- 2013: Giuseppe Verdi: Il corsaro; Teatro Regio di Parma, Blu-Ray, Unitel Classica e King Records (original release year: 2008)
- 2014: Georges Bizet: Carmen; Macerata Opera, DVD, Dynamic
- 2015: Georges Bizet: Carmen; Arena di Verona Festival, DVD, Bel Air Classiques
- 2015: Charles Gounod: Faust; Teatro Regio di Torino, DVD/Blu-Ray, Unitel Classica
- 2018: Wolfgang Amadeus Mozart: Don Giovanni; Estates Theatre, DVD/Blu-Ray, CMajor Entertainment
