= Erich Binder =

Austrian musician, violinist and conductor

Erich Binder (December 6, 1947 – December 20, 2023) was an Austrian violinist, pianist and conductor.

== Life ==
From 1954 to 1956 Binder was a member of the Wiener Sängerknaben. He then studied violin, piano, organ, singing, composition and orchestral conducting with Hans Swarowsky at the Musikhochschule in Vienna. During his studies he already worked as a répétiteur in the singing classes of Elisabeth Radó and Christl Mardayn at the same university. After his studies, Binder held concert master positions in the Bregenz Orchestra, the Vienna Volksoper Orchestra, as first concertmaster at the Bayreuth Festival, the Vienna Philharmonic and the NDR Symphony Orchestra Hamburg. In the second half of the 1970s he increasingly began to work as a conductor. His repertoire now includes more than 60 operas and about 300 symphonic works.

In 1981 he was awarded the Dr. Karl-Böhm-Preis für junge österreichische Dirigenten in Salzburg, which was awarded only four times. He also received the special prize of the Alban Berg Foundation and a conducting contract with the Vienna State Opera. He has conducted the Vienna Philharmonic in a subscription concert, the London Philharmonic Orchestra and opera performances at the Vienna State Opera (including the premiere of Faust in the production of Ken Russell, 1985) at the Bavarian State Opera and at Milan's La Scala, as well as concerts in Belgium, Germany, France, Italy, Spain, England, Australia and Japan.
