= John Adam Hugo =

American composer and pianist

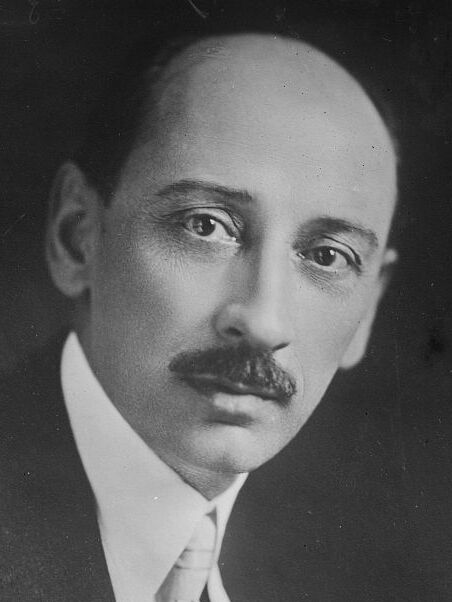
John Adam Hugo circa 1920

John Adam Hugo (1873–1945) was an American composer and pianist.

A native of Bridgeport, Connecticut, Hugo studied from 1888 until 1897 at the Stuttgart Conservatory; his instructors there included Wilhelm Speidel, Immanuel Faisst, Árpád Doppler, and Hermann Zumpe. He embarked on a career as a concert pianist, appearing in Germany, England, and Italy before returning to his native country in 1899. That year he became an instructor of piano at the Peabody Institute in Baltimore, where he remained for only one year before becoming the director of the European Conservatory and director of the music department of its Woman's College, in which positions he worked from 1901 until 1906. Beginning in the latter year he became a private teacher of piano in Baltimore. Hugo later returned to the city of his birth, where he died.

Hugo composed three operas, of which one, The Temple Dancer, was performed at the Metropolitan Opera in 1919; the other two were The Hero of Byzanz (a student work) and The Sun God. He also wrote a symphony; two piano concertos; some chamber music; and many songs.
