= Marston Records =

American independent record label

- Founded: 1997
- Founder: Ward Marston, Scott Kessler
- Genre: Classical
- Country of origin: U.S.
- Location: West Chester, Pennsylvania
- Official website: www.marstonrecords.com

Marston Records is an independent American record label. The label specializes in the remastering and reissuing of very early and rare recordings. It was founded in 1997 by Ward Marston and Scott Kessler.

== Releases on Marston Records ==
Collections of rare recordings of singers include Giuseppe Anselmi, Jane Bathori, Mattia Battistini, Celestina Boninsegna, Max Bouvet, Rosalia Chalia, Feodor Chaliapin, Arthur Endrèze, Emilio de Gogorza, Lotte Lehmann, Félia Litvinne, Fernando De Lucia, John McCormack, Léon Melchissédec, Graziella Pareto, Maurice Renaud, Tito Schipa, Lotte Schöne, Hina Spani, Conchita Supervía, Lawrence Tibbett, Vanni-Marcoux, César Vezzani and Francisco Viñas. Collections of pianists' rare recordings include Josef Hofmann, Raoul von Koczalski, Jorge Bolet and Vladimir de Pachmann.
