= Joseph Carl Breil =

American opera singer

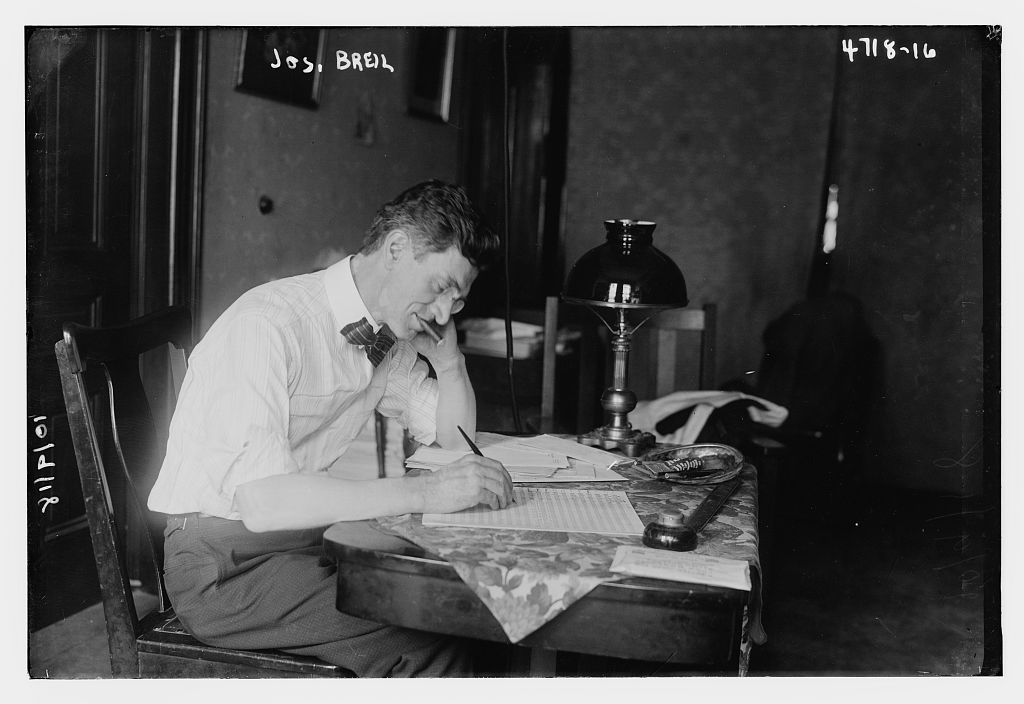
- Breil in 1918
- Born: June 29, 1870; Pittsburgh, Pennsylvania, U.S.
- Died: January 23, 1926 (aged 55); Los Angeles, California, U.S.
- Education: Duquesne University; Leipzig University
- Occupation: Composer
- Spouse: Alta Gelvin

Joseph Carl Breil (29 June 1870 – 23 January 1926) was an American lyric tenor, stage director, composer and conductor. He was one of the earliest American composers to compose specific music for motion pictures. His first film was Les amours de la reine Élisabeth (1912) starring Sarah Bernhardt. He later composed and arranged scores for several other early motion pictures, including such epics as D. W. Griffith's The Birth of a Nation (1915) and Intolerance (1916), as well as scoring the preview version of The Phantom of the Opera (1925), a score that is now lost. His love theme for "Birth of a Nation", titled "The Perfect Song", was published by Chappell & Co. in an arrangement for voice and keyboard. It was later used as the theme for the radio show Amos 'n' Andy.

== Life ==
Joseph was the first of four children born to Joseph and Margaret Breil of Pittsburgh. (Joseph Sr., a lawyer, was an immigrant from Prussia and his wife was born in Pennsylvania.) Breil graduated from Duquesne University (then the Pittsburgh Catholic College of the Holy Ghost) in 1888. He later composed the alma mater for the university, which was first performed in October 1920. He also pursued studies at St Fidelis College (Butler, Pennsylvania) and Curry Commercial College in Pittsburgh before being sent by his family to the University of Leipzig to study law. While in Leipzig he began to study music composition and singing at the Leipzig Conservatory. These were followed by singing lessons in Milan and Philadelphia (with Giuseppe del Puente).

He toured as principal tenor of the Emma Juch Opera Company (1891–1892) before returning to Pittsburgh to teach singing and to direct the choir of St Paul's Cathedral (1892–1897). From 1897 to 1903 he was music director for several theatre companies. An article in The New York Times, dated 12 June 1914, noted that he "...will conduct the orchestra at the Illinois Theatre, Chicago, during the engagement of the second presentation of Gabriele D'Annunzio's Cabiria, which opens on Thursday night." Between 1903 and 1910 he was employed by the music publisher Chappell, for whom he composed many instrumental pieces and songs in addition to his role there as a staff arranger and music editor. His first critical success as a composer came in 1909 with his incidental music, including Song of the Soul (recorded by Marguerite Dunlap for Victor Records in 1910), for Edward Locke's three-act play, The Climax, which premiered on 12 April 1909, at Joseph W. Weber's Music Hall, New York City. After this he spent the next decade composing mostly film music. It is his work in this medium that his legacy rests on. He also composed the one-act lyric opera, The Legend, one of the first such works by an American. The Legend, on which Breil had begun work in 1907, premièred at the Metropolitan Opera on 12 March 1919, to less-than-favorable reviews. He died of heart disease on 23 January 1926, following a nervous breakdown suffered on account of the failure of his final opera, Der Asra.

== Personal life ==
Breil married Alta (Dot) Gelvin.

== Operas ==
- Orlando of Milan (c. 1888)
- Love Laughs at Locksmiths (27 October 1910, Portland, Maine)
- Prof. Tattle (1913)
- The Seventh Chord (1913)
- The Legend (12 March 1919, Metropolitan Opera)
- Der Asra (24 November 1925, Los Angeles Opera)
