= Elvira de Hidalgo =

Spanish operatic soprano and pedagogue

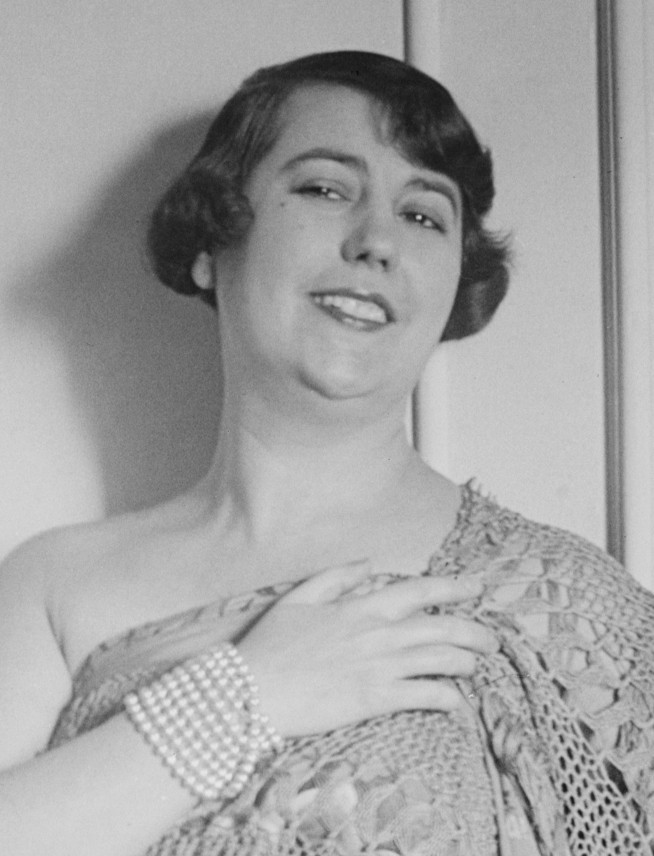
- Elvira de Hidalgo, 1920s.
- Born: Elvira Juana Rodríguez Roglán; 28 December 1891; Valderrobres (Teruel), Spain
- Died: 21 January 1980 (aged 88); Milan, Italy
- Occupations: Opera singer (soprano); pedagogue

Elvira Juana Rodríguez Roglán (December 28, 1891 – January 21, 1980), known professionally as Elvira de Hidalgo, was a prominent Spanish coloratura soprano, who later became a teacher and vocal coach. Her most famous pupil was Maria Callas.

== Biography ==
She was born in Valderrobres, Aragon, in the northeast of Spain to Pedro Rodríguez Hidalgo and Miguela Roglán Bel.

She was a pupil of Concepció Bordalba in Barcelona and later studied in Milan under Melchiorre Vidal, who also taught Maria Barrientos, Graziella Pareto, Julián Gayarre, Fernando Valero, Francesc Viñas, and Rosina Storchio.

She made her debut at the age of sixteen, at the Teatro di San Carlo in Naples, as Rosina in The Barber of Seville, which would become her best-known role. Following her debut, de Hidalgo was quickly engaged for Paris, where she sang Rosina opposite Feodor Chaliapin as Don Basilio. Appearances in Monte Carlo, Prague, and Cairo followed. Her debut with the New York Metropolitan Opera occurred in 1910, as Rosina. With that company, de Hidalgo sang in Rigoletto (with Enrico Caruso) and La sonnambula (with Alessandro Bonci) in the same season. She would return to the Met in 1924-25, for The Barber of Seville (directed by Armando Agnini), Rigoletto (conducted by Tullio Serafin), and Lucia di Lammermoor (with Beniamino Gigli). Following that New York debut, she sang in Florence, in Linda di Chamounix and Don Giovanni (as Zerlina, opposite Mattia Battistini). She also portrayed Rosina in Rome, in 1911. The soprano sang, as well, with Giuseppe Anselmi in Rigoletto, in St Petersburg, in 1913.

In 1916, she made her debut at La Scala, Milan, as Rosina, and returned there in 1921. The following year, de Hidalgo appeared in Buenos Aires at the Teatro Colón, in Rigoletto, La traviata, and The Barber of Seville. In 1924, she appeared in London with the British National Opera Company, at Covent Garden, in Rigoletto. On 17 February 1924, she also appeared at the Royal Albert Hall with the London Symphony Orchestra and Sir Thomas Beecham conducting. That same year, she sang Lakmé and Il barbiere in Chicago. In 1926-27, she appeared opposite Chaliapin again, for a tour of the United States and Canada, with his Universal Artists Incorporation Company, in Il barbiere.

== Recordings ==
Elvira de Hidalgo recorded for Columbia, with arias from Il barbiere, La sonnambula, and I puritani committed to disc in 1907-08. In 1909-10 she made discs for Fonotipia, with excerpts recorded from Il barbiere, Don Pasquale, La sonnambula, Roméo et Juliette, Dinorah, L'elisir d'amore, Don Giovanni, and Mireille. She apparently returned to the Columbia studios, in 1925, to record a performance of the "Mad Scene" from Dinorah, then again to the studio in 1937-38. She is heard in Volume II of EMI's The Record of Singing.

== Teaching career ==
Elvira de Hidalgo began teaching in 1933, and later held a position at the Athens Conservatoire, where the young soprano Maria Callas became her student. In 1957, Callas wrote of the woman who had an "essential role" in her artistic formation:

It is to this illustrious Spanish artist, whom the public and the old subscribers at La Scala will certainly recall as an unforgettable and superlative Rosina and as a splendid interpreter of other important roles, it is to this illustrious artist, I repeat, with a moved, devoted, and grateful heart, that I owe all my preparation and my artistic formation as an actress and musician. This elect woman, who, besides giving me her precious teaching, gave me her whole heart as well ....

== Death ==
De Hidalgo died in Milan in 1980. She was initially buried in an unidentified grave until 1990 upon expiration, when her pupils and friends paid to relocate her remains to the Cimitero Maggiore di Milano, which expired in 2020. Her remains were exhumed on 26 February 2018 and transferred to Barcelona on 5 March. On 29 July, her remains returned and was re-buried in her hometown in Spain, with a lyrical gala, coinciding the inauguration of the exhibition dedicated to her memory at the Museo de Valderrobres, which featured a screening of Maria by Callas, and the placement of a plaque in her home building.

== Sources ==
- Callas, As They Saw Her, by David Allan Lowe, The Ungar Publishing Company, 1986. ISBN 0-8044-5636-4
- The Concise Oxford Dictionary of Opera, by John Warrack & Ewan West, Oxford University Press, 1996. ISBN 0-19-280028-0
