= Fonotipia Records =

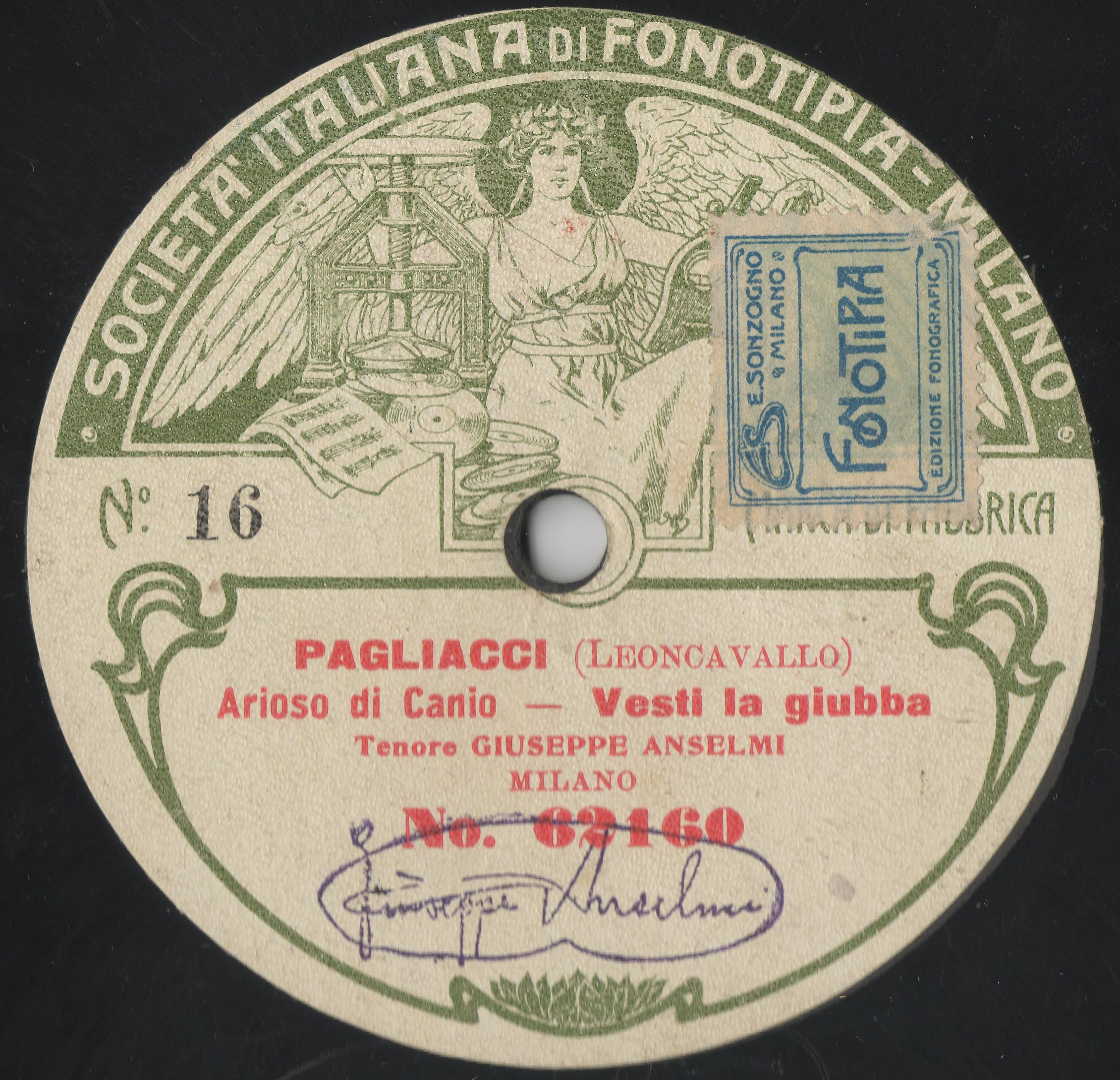
- Founded: 1904
- Founder: Baron Frederic d'Erlanger
- Status: Defunct
- Genre: Classical Music, opera
- Country of origin: Italy

Fonotipia Records, or Dischi Fonotipia, was an Italian gramophone record label established in 1904 with a charter to record the art of leading opera singers and some other celebrity musicians, chiefly violinists. Fonotipia continued to operate into the electrical recording era, which commenced in 1925–26, by which time the company had been absorbed into Odeon records. The records made by Fonotipia are prized by collectors and musicologists for their high technical quality, and for the high artistic merit and interest of much of what was captured for posterity.

The Fonotipia catalogues were reconstructed, so far as then possible, by the discophiles J.R. Bennett and James Dennis in 1953, and published in a limited edition. Fifty years later, a complete discography with accurate recording-session dates was compiled and made available to the public, following the rediscovery of key company documents. Fonotipia is not to be confused with the Phonotype record label which was active for part of the same period.

== History of the issues ==
Fonotipia records was established in 1904 by the Anglo-French composer Baron Frederic d'Erlanger (1868–1943), as the Società Italiana di Fonotipia, Milano expressly for recording celebrities, principally opera singers. (A recent re-issue of some titles states that it was formed as part of the International Talking Machine Company of Berlin.) The records were lateral needle-cut of the usual kind, starting at the outer edge, and playing at speeds at or near 78 rpm.

Fonotipia's output was issued in various record sizes. The original series of one thousand titles (numbered 39000-39999) was issued in the 27 cm or ten and three-quarter inch format. (Disc xPH 1, issued as 39003, was cut in 1904 by the great La Scala baritone Giuseppe Pacini, who sings the operatic aria "Il balen" from Verdi's Il Trovatore). Unlike the Gramophone Company's more refined numbering system, Fonotipia's system agglomerated male, female and ensemble artists, with piano accompaniments, on an indiscriminate basis. This original series was complete by 1907 when a new 27 cm series, 62000, was begun, also with piano accompaniment. From late 1907, it ran in tandem with the 27 m 92000 series, which had orchestral accompaniments.

In 1905, the 69000 series was introduced. It featured a large disc of 35 cm (13 and three-quarter inches); but it ran to only 22 titles before being discontinued as unpopular with the consumer market, owing to the format. However this short series had the distinction of including the only known commercial records by the great Polish tenor Jean de Reszke, arguably the greatest tenor in the world before Caruso; namely the titles 69000, "Scene du tombeau" (from Roméo et Juliette, by Gounod), and 69001, "Ô Souverain, Ô Juge, Ô Père" (from Le Cid, by Massenet). Unfortunately, the records were never officially issued, and although there have long been rumours of the existence of a test pressing or two, no copy is certainly known to exist. It appears that de Reszke may have had the pressings destroyed because he was disappointed with the results. Nonetheless, this fabled relic has become the 'Holy Grail' of record collectors, who must fall back on the faint and scratchy Mapleson Cylinders, recorded during live performances at the New York Metropolitan Opera, in order to hear a dim echo of de Reszke's voice.

The 35 cm Fonotipia series also included two titles by the Czech violinist Jan Kubelík, including 69010, a transcription of the Sextet from Lucia di Lammermoor.

Also in 1905, the famous Romanian soprano Hariclea Darclée, one of the most celebrated singers of the turn of the century and an important creator of many great operatic roles such as the title-roles in Puccini's Tosca, Catalani's La Wally and Mascagni's Iris, made a series of recordings of arias from Cavalleria Rusticana, Tosca, Don Pasquale, La Traviata and Iris. None of them were ever published and remain lost to this day. These were to be her only commercial recordings, and nowadays the only surviving records of her voice are two privately made discs of two short Romanian popular songs made around 1911 that are mostly sung in 'half voice' and therefore don't reveal much of her voice or artistry.

There was also a 12" (30 cm) series, issued under the number 74000 and following. It included some operatic titles, though most of the first 100 numbers were dedicated to band music, or to the work of violinists Kubelik and Franz von Vecsey. They resumed as 74100 for another series with orchestral accompaniment. The 74000 series ceased production with the advent of electrical recording in about 1925. Incidentally, 92000, the orchestral 27 cm series, was completed in 1914, and was replaced by the 69000 series, now issued at 27 cm and commencing with 69050. There was a break in activity during the First World War. By 1922, Fonotipia had become a partner of Odeon Records, and in that year a new, conventional 10" series numbered 152000 was begun. This series included a good deal of inferior material.

The 1925 catalogue is thought to have been the last issued under the Fonotipia name, though many titles remained and were listed under one cover with the Odeon catalogue. Electrical recording was begun in Italy in 1926, and the first such issues were released with the 1928 catalogue. Many of the matrices were carried over into pressings issued under Odeon labels. It also seems possible that some of the actual recording equipment was transferred to the Odeon studios, for a distinctive feature of the tracking of the groove-cutting equipment in Fonotipia records shows a single revolution halfway through the side where the groove is widely spaced, and this idiosyncrasy (a security feature so that pirate stampers electroplated from a Fonotipia original could be instantly recognised) occasionally persists under Odeon's aegis.

== The Catalogues: celebrity artists ==
The reconstruction of the Fonotipia catalogues was undertaken in 1953 with the help of several record collectors worldwide that had access to assemblages of the actual discs. The result was a valuable but slim hardback volume, published in Ipswich, UK, by the Record Collector Shop (at 61 Fore Street).

In 2003, Historic Masters Ltd (in association with EMI) published the complete Fonotipia discography taken from the original recording ledgers, which were found at the EMI studios in Milan by Keith Hardwick and Ruth Edge. This work was issued in database format on a CD-ROM and is still available from Historic Masters. Over 10,000 sides recorded by Fonotipia and associated companies are detailed on the CD-ROM. For the first time, exact recording dates have been made available.

In 2004, the centennial year of the founding of Fonotipia, Michael Henstock published his monumental 707-page work Fonotipia Recordings in a limited edition of two hundred copies produced by the Cambridge University Press. The bulk of the data was taken from the Fonotipia ledgers (at the EMI Group Archive Trust), recording sheets (held at the National Sound Archive, London), published discographies, record pressings, original catalogues, Fonotipia Company documentation, and the writings of former employees of Fonotipia and associated companies. It lists chronologically every matrix number from XPh 1 (and variants) to 7261, followed by Paris and Berlin recordings, the Wartime Series, recordings made for sister companies, an artist index, an index by issue number, and Fonotipia matrices with no traceable Fonotipia issue number.

Among the singers, many of them famous, who recorded for Fonotipia were the following:

Aino Ackté, Pasquale Amato, Giuseppe Anselmi, Teresa Arkel, Ernesto Badini, Aristide Baracchi, Maria Barrientos, Ramon Blanchart, Alessandro Bonci, Giuseppe Borgatti, Georgette Bréjean-Silver, Eugenia Burzio, Victor Capoul, Mercedes Capsir, Maria Carena, Margherita Carosio, Ferruccio Corradetti, Emilia Corsi, Armando Crabbé, Gilda Dalla Rizza, Leon David, Nazzareno de Angelis, Elvira de Hidalgo, Giuseppe De Luca, Fernando De Lucia, Emmy Destinn, Adamo Didur, Léon Escalais, Giuseppina Finzi-Magrini, Nicola Fusati, Edoardo Garbin, Giovanni Inghilleri, Maria Jeritza, Jan Kiepura, Solomiya Krushelnytska, Giacomo Lauri-Volpi, Félia Litvinne, Oreste Luppi, Antonio Magini-Coletti, Luigi Manfrini, Gino Martinez-Patti, Victor Maurel, Irene Minghini-Cattaneo, Francesco Navarini, Giuseppe Noto, Giuseppe Pacini, Rosetta Pampanini, Tancredi Pasero, Aureliano Pertile, Lily Pons, Giannina Russ, Mario Sammarco, Emile Scaramberg, Mariano Stabile, Rosina Storchio, Riccardo Stracciari, Conchita Supervia, Richard Tauber, Ninon Vallin, Ernest van Dyck, Francisco Viñas and Giovanni Zenatello.

In addition to Jan Kubelík and Franz von Vecsey, classical violinists gracing the firm's catalogue included Jacques Thibaud, Bronisław Huberman and Váša Příhoda. At least one recording was made, too, of playwright Victorien Sardou reciting some of his work.

Around 700 Fonotipia records have been digitized by the Bibliothèque nationale de France and made available on its digital library Gallica

== See also ==
- List of Italian companies
- List of record labels

== Sources ==
- J.R. Bennett, Dischi Fonotipia - A Golden Treasury (Record Collector Shop, Ipswich 1953).
