= Fernando De Lucia =

Italian opera singer (died 1925)

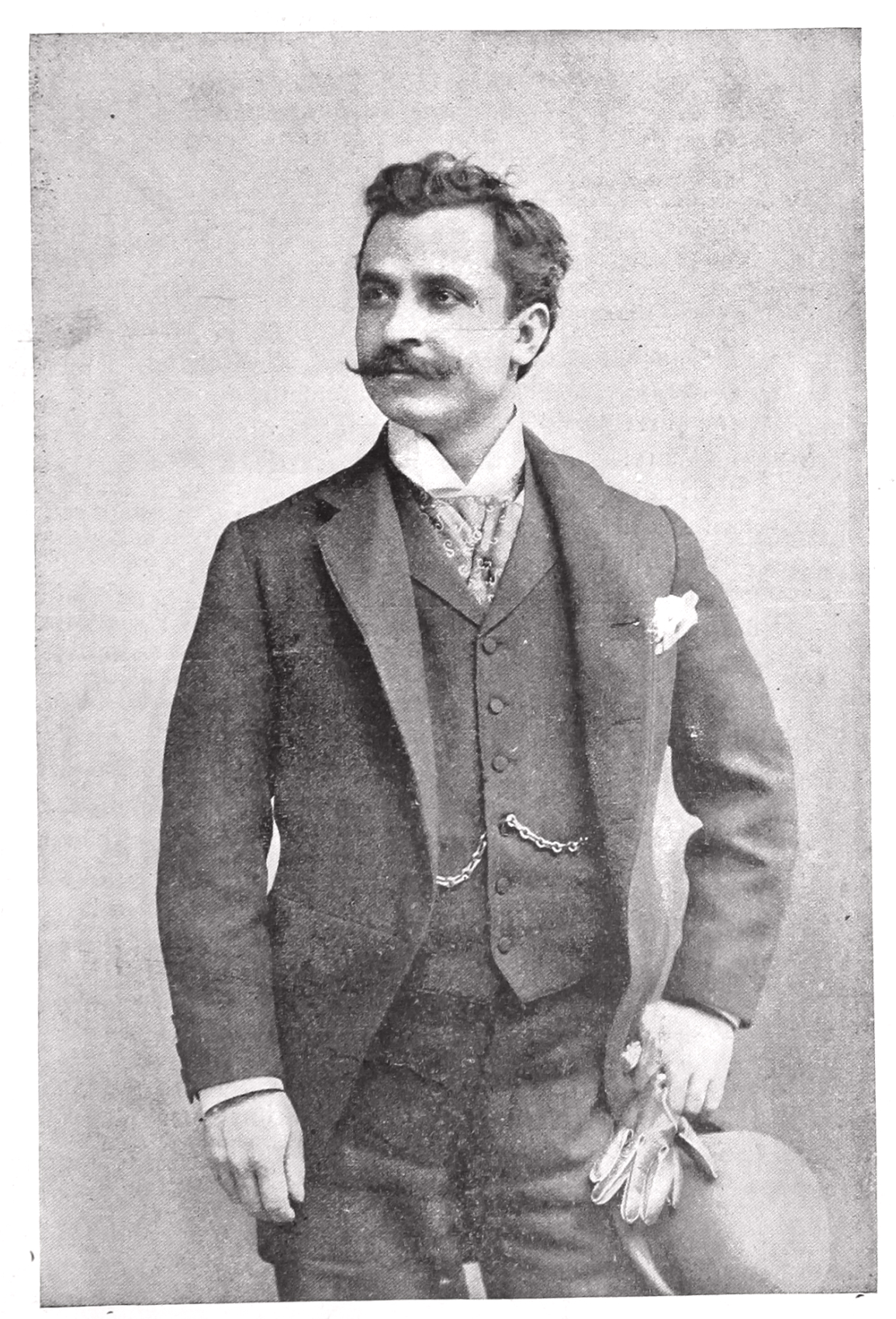
1895 portrait of De Lucia from "Freund's Weekly" magazine

Fernando De Lucia (11 October 1860 or 1 September 1861 – 21 February 1925) was an Italian operatic tenor and singing teacher who enjoyed an internationally successful career.

De Lucia was admired in his lifetime as a striking exponent of verismo parts — particularly Canio in Leoncavallo's Pagliacci — and of certain roles written by Verdi and Puccini. Since then, however, he has acquired a great posthumous reputation among record collectors for something different. They hail him as the exemplar of a type of graceful, ornamental tenor singing which originated prior to verismo and that went out of fashion for a long time, only to reemerge in recent years. Especially valued are the recordings that De Lucia made of Almaviva's arias and duets from Rossini's bel canto comic opera Il barbiere di Siviglia (The Barber of Seville).

== Early career ==
De Lucia was born in Naples, where he studied at the Naples Music Conservatory with Vincenzo Lombardi and Beniamino Carelli. He made his debut at the Teatro di San Carlo, Naples, as Gounod's Faust in 1885. Over the next two or three years he sang in Spain, South America and in the smaller Italian opera houses, in Linda di Chamounix, Dinorah, L'elisir d'amore, Fra Diavolo and La sonnambula. While in Madrid he was hired by Augustus Harris and Herman Klein for his first London appearances in the Drury Lane season of 1887; but although Klein liked his Alfredo, he went comparatively unnoticed due to the British debut of the charismatic tenor Jean de Reszke. His Almaviva in Il barbiere di Siviglia (a role later closely associated with him) was described as "truly detestable" by The Times newspaper.

== Mascagni, Rome and Florence ==
On 31 October 1891, De Lucia took part in the world premiere of L'amico Fritz, singing the role of Fritz Kobus opposite the French diva Emma Calvé. The opera had been composed by the up-and-coming musician Pietro Mascagni and its debut occurred in Rome at the Costanzi Theatre. For a singer later upheld (by some) as the rarified model of bel canto style the situation was originally quite otherwise; De Lucia was, in fact, famous during his career not as a bel canto stylist, but as a performer of Mascagni and Ruggero Leoncavallo's earthy, melodramatic verismo characters. De Lucia capitalized on Europe's Mascagni craze of the early 1890s. Accordingly, in November 1892, he was engaged by the Florence opera house to create the tenor lead in Mascagni's third opera, I Rantzau. Appearing with him in the work was the virtuoso baritone Mattia Battistini.

== Verismo firsts in London, 1893 ==
De Lucia's verismo-opera career continued apace with the first English performance (on 19 May 1893, with Enrico Bevignani conducting), of Leoncavallo's Pagliacci, opposite Nellie Melba and Mario Ancona. De Lucia sang the part of Canio, which had been created a year earlier in Milan by Fiorello Giraud. Klein describes an audience breathless with excitement, and De Lucia's burning intensity in the role as a triumph of realism. Mascagni made his own London debut at Covent Garden, conducting L'amico Fritz on 19 June 1893 with Calvé and, of course, De Lucia in the cast. Soon afterwards, again with Calvé, and accompanied by the song composer Paolo Tosti, De Lucia sang excerpts from Cavalleria rusticana for Queen Victoria at Windsor. On 7 July of that year, appearing in a cast which included soprano Nellie Melba and the baritones Mario Ancona and David Bispham, he gave the first British performance of I Rantzau at Covent Garden. (The opera was not a great success.)

== London and Milan ==
In 1893-94, De Lucia sang in New York City at the Metropolitan Opera. He repeated his Canio with Melba and Ancona, and this was esteemed, but he was disliked as Don Ottavio in Don Giovanni and as the Duke of Mantua in Rigoletto. He did not repeat the experience. In London in 1894, he performed both Cavalleria rusticana and Pagliacci (together on one night) at Covent Garden, with Ancona in the lead baritone parts. Shaw admired the "'altogether exceptional dramatic force" which their performances gave to the pair of works. That season he was also in a bilingual (French-Italian) Faust, with Melba, Ancona and Bauermeister. Shaw thought the role of Faust too heavy for De Lucia: his "dramatic instinct helped him well through a part in which he seemed likely to be overweighted. Several times in the garden scene he found the right musical treatment with exceptional success." That was also his verdict of his Duke in a Rigoletto with Melba, Ancona and Giulia Ravogli, though he got through the music 'adroitly and pluckily'.

De Lucia sang at La Scala in 1895 in the world premiere of Mascagni's Silvano, and also appeared in the first Milan performances of Puccini's La bohème and Massenet's La Navarraise. At Covent Garden in that same year, he shared the principal tenor work with the heavier-voiced Francesco Tamagno and Albert Alvarez in the absence of Jean de Reszke. The American baritone David Bispham thought De Lucia admirable in Fra Diavolo that year. The cast of Auber's light-hearted opera featured Bispham and Mme Amadi (as Lord and Lady Allcash) and Marie Engle (as Zerlina), as well as the bass Vittorio Arimondi and the buffo baritone Antonio Pini-Corsi (as brigands).

In 1897, he sang in a state concert at London's Buckingham Palace to mark Queen Victoria's Royal Jubilee. At the Costanzi Theatre, Rome, on 22 November 1898, he created the role of Osaka in Mascagni's Iris, and at Covent Garden on 12 July 1900 he played Cavaradossi in the first performance of Tosca in England, supporting the Floria Tosca of Milka Ternina, with Antonio Scotti as Scarpia and Luigi Mancinelli conducting. The "Musical Times" found that his performance was highly effective and that his character exactly suited that of Cavaradossi.

De Lucia was also admired in London as Don Jose in Bizet's Carmen. He appeared, too, in the same composer's I pescatori di perle and in various works by Rossini, Bellini and Verdi. His last London season would be in 1905, in an outstanding operatic company assembled by Henry Russell for the Waldorf Theatre (now the Novello Theatre). De Lucia's colleagues on this occasion were the tenor Alessandro Bonci, Ancona and Pini-Corsi.

In 1916, De Lucia delivered his farewell performance at La Scala as Rodolfo. He said goodbye to his loyal Neapolitan supporters the following year at the Teatro di San Carlo. De Lucia's final appearance before the public occurred at the funeral of the incomparable Enrico Caruso in Naples in 1921. In his later years, De Lucia dwelt in Naples and taught at the conservatory there, in which he himself had been trained. His most famous pupil was the French tenor Georges Thill. He died in his native city of Naples.

== His vocal technique ==
Although De Lucia's stage career was closely tied to works by his contemporaries Mascagni and Leoncavallo, the vocal method that he exhibited in their operas was not the strenuous, declamatory mode of singing normally associated by modern listeners with the verismo movement. Because his voice was not overly powerful or extensive in range, he needed to rely on his histrionic skills to project the drama fully. When it came to his actual singing, he delivered the music at hand in a flowery and fluttery way that has no modern equivalent.

De Lucia's recordings of arias and duets from Rossini's Barber of Seville ('Ecco ridente', 'Se il mio nome' and 'Numero quindici', for example) show off his vocal characteristics to an even greater extent than do his records of verismo pieces (or even lyrical Verdian parts, such as Alfredo in La traviata). They contain a studied display of fioritura, rubato, limpid phrasing and portamento which appears to be a deliberate re-statement of the so-called bel canto style practised by previous generations of Italian tenors; or perhaps more accurately, a re-statement of that style's surviving mannerisms. These mannerisms were already dying out in the early 1900s when audiences came to prefer their tenor idols to sing in a more full-blooded, robust and straightforward way.

George Bernard Shaw wrote tellingly of De Lucia in June 1892. Having seen his L'amico Fritz, he stated that: "Signor De Lucia succeeds [Fernando] Valero ... as artificial tenor in ordinary to the establishment. His thin strident forte is in tune and does not tremble beyond endurance; and his mezza voce, though monotonous and inexpressive, is pretty as prettiness goes in the artificial school." In 1894 Shaw speaks of De Lucia as a tenor of the Julián Gayarre school, without the "goat-bleat" of its extreme disciples. This comment of Shaw's provides a clue. Like Valero, Gayarre was taught by Melchiorre Vidal in Madrid. Another of Vidal's pupils, soprano Rosina Storchio, was closely associated with verismo premieres. De Lucia, who sang in Spain in the 1880s, may have imbibed the example set by those who studied with Vidal.

By referring to De Lucia as an artificial tenor, Shaw is associating him with other tenors who employed a similar vocal technique, and were inclined to colour and phrase in the same sort of way as De Lucia. They include Alessandro Bonci, Giuseppe Anselmi, Fiorello Giraud, Charles Friant, Edmond Clement, and David Devries. The voices of several of these tenors had a fast vibrato which is apparent on their gramophone records. Musicologists debate whether this is a genuine stylistic hand-me-down from the "bel canto" singing tradition founded by the virtuoso tenor Giovanni Rubini (1794–1854) or merely a flaw, attributable to inadequate breath support, in the vocal method adopted subsequent to Rubini by some Mediterranean tenors.

Many other famous Mediterranean tenors active in De Lucia's day, such as Francesco Tamagno, Francesco Marconi, Emilio De Marchi, Francesco Vignas (a Vidal pupil, paradoxically), Giuseppe Borgatti, Giovanni Zenatello and, of course, Enrico Caruso, did not 'tremble' like De Lucia and his ilk when they sang, but their repertoire was often in heavier roles. This fact is borne out by their recordings. (Unlike the other tenors mentioned above, De Marchi did not make commercial discs; but he can be heard singing part of the role of Cavaradossi on brief cylinder recordings made live at the Metropolitan Opera House in 1903.)

== Recording career ==
Gramophone Company Recordings. De Lucia had a 20-year relationship (1902–1922) with the gramophone, producing discs that have acquired an almost legendary status among collectors. He recorded, often hauntingly, the following titles for the Gramophone Company between 1902 and 1908. The dates are the issue dates: more than one date indicates two separate recordings. All are 10-inch records unless otherwise shown. The partners in duets are Antonio Pini-Corsi (baritone), Maria Galvany (soprano), Giuseppina Huguet (sop), Celestina Boninsegna (soprano) and Ernesto Badini (baritone).

- 'Stradella': Aria di chiesa (Pietà, Signore!) 1907.
- Mozart, Don Giovanni: Il mio tesoro, 1908. Dalla sua pace, 1908.
- Rossini, Il barbiere di Siviglia: Ecco ridente, 1902; 1904 (12"); 1908 (12"). Se il mio nome, 1908. Numero quindici (w. Pini-Corsi), 1906. Ah, qual colpo inaspettato (w. Galvany), 1908; (w. Huguet and A. Pini-Corsi), 1906 (12"). All'idea di quel metallo (w. Pini-Corsi), 1906 (12").
- Bellini, La sonnambula: Ah! perché non posso odiarti?, 1908. Son geloso del zeffiro (w. Galvany), 1908 (12"). Prendi, l'anel ti dono (w. Galvany), 1908 (12").
- Donizetti, La favorita: Una vergine, un'angiol di dio, 1904. L'elisir d'amore: Obbligato obbligato (w. Badini), 1907.
- Verdi, Luisa Miller: Quando le sere al placido, 1908 (12"). Rigoletto: La donna e mobile, 1902. La traviata: Un dì, felice, 1904. Dei miei bollenti spiriti, 1906 (12"). Parigi, o cara, noi lasceremo (w. Huguet), 1906 (12").
- Wagner, Lohengrin: Cigno gentil, 1902. Deh, non t'incantan, 1906. S'ei torna alfin, 1906. Cigno fedel, 1907 (12"). Cessarono i canti alfin (w. Huguet), 1907 (12"). Mai deve domandarmi (w. Huguet), 1907 (12").
- Bizet, Carmen: Il fior che avevi 1902; 1907 (12"). La tua madre (w. Huguet), 1907 (12"). Pearl fishers: Della mia vita, 1906. Mi par d'udir ancora, 1906. Non hai compreso (w. Huguet), 1906 (12").
- Gounod, Faust: Salve dimora, 1906. Tardi si fa (w. Boninsegna), 1904 (12"); (w. Huguet), 1907 (12"). Romeo e Giulietta, Deh sorgi, o luce, 1908.
- Thomas, Mignon: La tua bell'alma, 1906. Ah non credevi tu, 1906. Addio, Mignon, 1905 (12").
- Massenet, Manon: Il sogno, 1902; 1907. Werther: Ah! non mi ridestar, 1902.
- Mascagni, Cavalleria rusticana: Siciliana, 'O Lola', 1902.
- Giordano, Fedora: Amor ti vieta, 1902. Mia madre, 1904. Vedi, io piango, 1904.
- Puccini, Tosca: Recondita armonia, 1902.
- Cilea, Adriana Lecouvreur: L'anima ho stanca, 1904.(With the composer, Cilea, at the piano)
- Neapolitan and Italian Songs: Anon: Fenesta che lucive, 1902. Baldelli: A suon di baci, 1902. Luntananza, 1904 (with the composer Cilea at the piano), Barthelemy, Sulla bocca amorosa, 1908. Triste ritorno, 1908. Serenamente, 1909. Cannio: Carmela sua, 1909. di Capua: O sole mio! 1908. Costa: Napulitanata, 1902. Tu sei morta nella vita mia, 1902. Era di maggio, 1908. Oilì, oilà, 1909. de Curtis: A Surrentina, 1909.Denza: Occhi di fata, 1904. Gambardella: Nun me guardate, 1909. Ricciardi: Luna lù, 1909. Tosti: Serenata, 1904. Ideale, 1902. Marechiare, 1902.

Fonotipia Records. De Lucia also recorded 30 Neapolitan songs for the Fonotipia label (later subsumed by Odeon Records). This company began recording celebrity singers in October 1904, having been founded for that purpose by Baron d'Erlanger as the Società Italiana di Fonotipia, Milano. The De Lucia titles had the catalogue numbers 92695 to 92724. The 92000 sequence was cut between 1907 and 1914 on the characteristic ten-and three-quarter-inch Fonotipia record format, and De Lucia's were made in 1911 after the cessation of his work for the Gramophone Company. Some of these duplicate the HMV and Phonotype recordings.

Phonotype Records. Not to be confused with Fonotipia, De Lucia later became closely associated with the Phonotype Company. It has often been written that De Lucia founded and ran the company himself, but Henstock (below) has determined that this was not so. That said, De Lucia had a clear sense of preserving his artistry for future generations and was passionate about recording. The Phonotype issues include many operatic titles, including a near-complete Barber of Seville and Rigoletto. De Lucia also recorded much from operas he did not (and could never have hoped to) sing on the stage, including Niun mi tema from Verdi's Otello and from operas in which he created the tenor role (Mascagni's Iris and L'Amico Fritz). The repertoire is very wide and includes Tate's song Broken/baby doll (in Italian) and many duets with the "palpably mediocre" (Henstock) soprano De Angelis and the young baritone Benvenuto Franci, then at the start of his long and celebrated career. The Phonotype Records were made during the First World War through to 1922. De Lucia's ornaments and general interpretations became even more audacious; one notorious example being the change in the melody of Che gelida manina from Puccini's La Bohème. (see Discography and comment in Henstock)

Note: By the time that De Lucia came to make his first recordings, his upper register had contracted to such an extent that he was forced to transpose downwards some of the pieces that he committed to disc by a semi-tone, a full tone, or even three semi-tones.

== Other reading ==
- M. Henstock, Fernando de Lucia: Son of Naples (Duckworth 1990).
- G. Kobbé, The Complete Opera Book (English Edition) (London 1922).
- J. Steane, Singers of the Century (Duckworth 1996), 41-45.
