= Mario Sammarco =

Italian opera singer

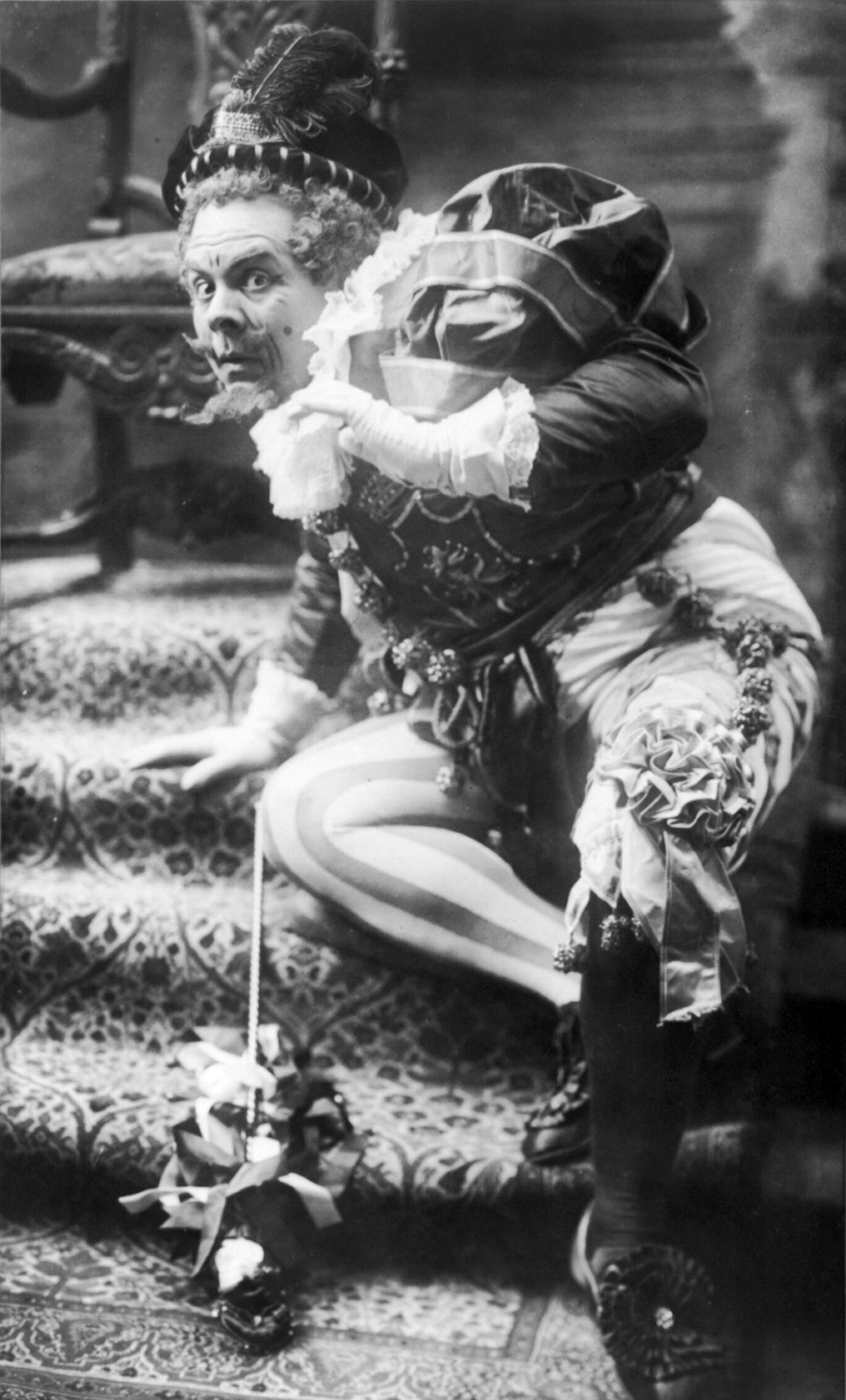
Mario Sammarco in costume

(Giuseppe) Mario Sammarco (13 December 1873 – 24 January 1930) was an Italian operatic baritone noted for his acting ability.

== Biography ==
Sammarco was born in Palermo, Sicily. At a young age he joined a choral class and took a few singing lessons but was dissuaded from pursuing music, the teacher saying that his voice was too small. It wasn't until he took the part of Valentine in an amateur performance of Faust that he was encouraged, at which point he began serious vocal study with Antonio Cantelli. He later studied singing with Giorgio M. Sulli.

Sammarco made his professional debut in the fourth and final version of Puccini's Le Villi on November 7, 1889 at the Teatro Dal Verme, Milan. He subsequently sang to acclaim in at La Scala (Italy's most celebrated theatre), Buenos Aires, and London. Between 1904 and 1919 he appeared intermittently, in 26 different roles, at the Royal Opera House, Covent Garden.

In New York City, he was hired by Oscar Hammerstein I for his Manhattan Opera Company as a replacement for the great French singing-actor Maurice Renaud. He sang with the Manhattan company in 1908–1910, becoming its principal Italian baritone, but he never 'graduated' to the rival Metropolitan Opera.

Sammarco next joined the Chicago–Philadelphia opera company. His career there continued smoothly enough until 1913 when he encountered a disapproving Mary Garden in a Chicago production of Tosca. The soprano requested that he be replaced; but after he named some of his former distinguished (and uncomplaining) Tosca partners, notably Emmy Destinn, the performances proceeded to be given to critical success.

His final operatic appearances were at the Teatro di San Carlo in Naples in 1919.

Admired for his versatility, he was at home in bel canto roles—Figaro, Enrico, Antonio in Linda di Chamounix, Alfonso in La favorita—and classic Verdian roles—from Carlo of Ernani, Rigoletto, Germont, and Renato to Iago and Falstaff—and in the more modern and verismo like Tosca and Pagliacci. He was an important part of this era's operatic life, creating the roles of Gerard in Giordano's Andrea Chénier in 1896, Cascart in Leoncavallo's Zazà in 1900, and Wurms in Franchetti's Germania.

Sammarco was active during an era that included many Italian baritones. He established an international career despite competition from singers such as Mattia Battistini, Antonio Magini-Coletti, Giuseppe Campanari, Mario Ancona, Giuseppe Pacini, Antonio Scotti, Eugenio Giraldoni, Riccardo Stracciari, Titta Ruffo, Domenico Viglione Borghese, Pasquale Amato and Carlo Galeffi.

He taught singing after retiring from the stage and died in Milan. One of his pupils was Sándor Svéd.

== Voice & recordings ==
Though Sammarco was only around 5'4" tall, Giacomo Lauri-Volpi calls his a "massive" and "accomplished" voice in a singer who "he knew how to declaim, with infallible intention and expression, and to captivate and move the audience where others merely look for applause." He also states that Sammarco was helped by his stature in the role of Rigoletto and that his conception of that character was different from the usual versions.

Scott and Steane regard Sammarco's recordings as disappointing. According to them, the technical quality of his singing disappoints, the timbre of his voice sounds rough, has an inability to sing less than mezzo forte, and seems to have no concept of legato. While valid responses to the recordings as standalone documents, Steane was born after Sammarco retired, and Scott was born after Sammarco had died. Neither ever heard the baritone or his colleagues in live performance.

However English critic Herman Klein, who saw and heard Sammarco numerous times at Covent Garden, states that his voice was one "of singular purity, breadth, and vibrant power, always in tune, well controlled, and capable of deep as well as varied expression." He also proclaims Sammarco was one of the two greatest Rigolettos of his time.

Many of the numerous 78-rpm gramophone records that he made prior to World War I for the Fonotipia, Victor, Pathé and the His Master's Voice companies are now available on CD reissues from various labels. Of particular interest are his recording with the first Tosca, soprano Emma Carelli, complete with peals of laughter; as well as his own creator records of Gérard's aria from Andrea Chenier, Cascart's arias from Zazà, Raffaele's arias from I gioielli della Madonna, Worms's aria from Germania.

== Sources ==
- Celletti, Rodolfo (1964). Le Grandi Voci. Rome: Istituto per la Collaborazione Culturale.
- Klein, Herman (1990). Herman Klein and the Gramophone: Being a Series of Essays on the Bel Canto (1923), the Gramophone and the Singer (1924-1934), and Reviews of New Classical Vocal Recordings (1925-1934), and Other Writings from the Gramophone. Portland, Oregon: Amadeus Press.
- Kutsch, K. J.; Riemens, Leo (1969). A Biographical Dictionary of Singers. New York: Chilton Book Company. ISBN 978-0-931340-18-5.
- Warrack, John; West, Ewan (1992). The Oxford Dictionary of Opera. ISBN 0-19-869164-5.
- Scott, Michael (1977). The Record of Singing (Volume One). London: Duckworth. ISBN 0-7156-1030-9.
