= Mario Ancona =

Italian operatic singer

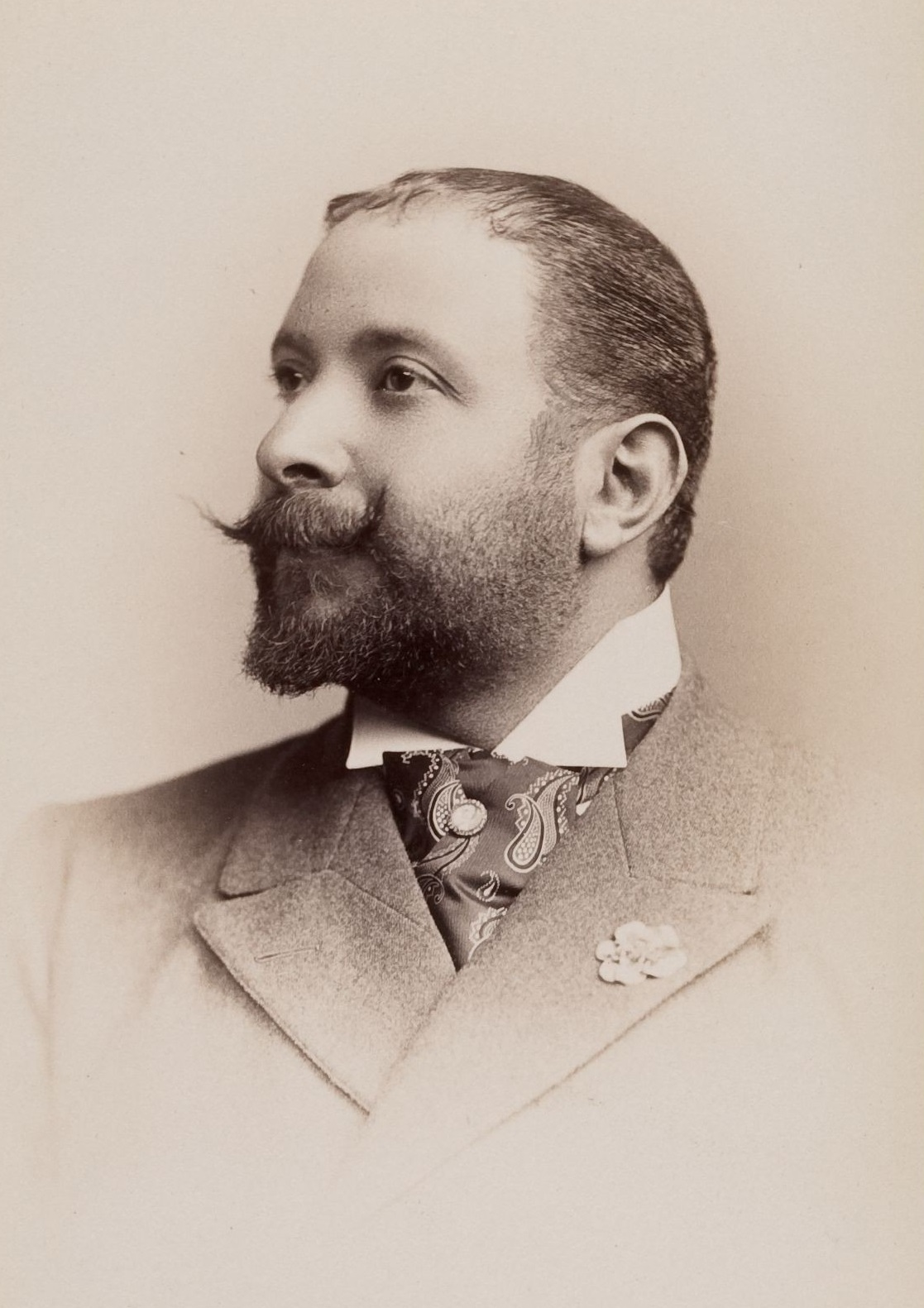
Mario Ancona, circa 1896

Mario Moisè Ancona (28 February 1860 – 23 February 1931), was a leading Italian baritone and master of bel canto singing. He appeared at some of the most important opera houses in Europe and America during what is commonly referred to as the "Golden Age of Opera".

== Career ==
Ancona was born into a middle-class Jewish family at Livorno, Tuscany, on 28 February 1860. After embarking on a business career he decided to study voice with a local singing teacher named Matteini in his native city of Livorno. Later, he took lessons from Giuseppe Cima in Milan.

Ancona is reputed to have made his debut as an amateur singer in 1880; but according to The Concise Oxford Dictionary of Opera—from which many of the ensuing appearance dates, venues and career highlights are taken—his earliest known professional appearance in an opera did not occur until 1889, when he sang the role of Scindia in Massenet's Le roi de Lahore in Trieste. Not long afterwards, he appeared in another Massenet opera, Le Cid, at Italy's principal theatre—La Scala, Milan. His arrival at La Scala so soon after his debut reflects the excellence of the technical grounding that he must have received as an amateur performer.

On 21 May 1892, Ancona was asked to create the part of Silvio in the first performance of Leoncavallo's Pagliacci, which took place at Milan's Teatro Dal Verme with Arturo Toscanini conducting. The next year, he appeared in the first London performance of Pagliacci at the Royal Opera House, Covent Garden. On this occasion, however, he sang the role of Tonio. (Soprano Nellie Melba and tenor Fernando De Lucia were also in the high-quality cast.)

Ancona would appear regularly at Covent Garden until 1901, being held in high esteem by London audiences. He also sang as a guest artist in Cairo, Lisbon, Madrid, Warsaw, Moscow, St. Petersburg, Chicago, Boston and Buenos Aires.

The New York Metropolitan Opera first engaged him in 1893. He sang successfully at the Met until 1897, when he went back to Europe. In 1906–1908, he returned to New York—this time to join the Manhattan Opera Company, where he was paid a generous fee. He became a special favourite of this company, which had been established by Oscar Hammerstein I in direct rivalry to the Met. His suave interpretation of Mozart's Don Giovanni was singled out for particular praise by newspaper reviewers and the Manhattan audiences.

Ancona sang in Paris in 1908, and again in 1914, at the Sarah Bernhardt theatre, where he was complimented by Bernhardt in person for his impressive singing. The illustrious French actress was not alone in her admiration for Ancona's vocal artistry. Music critics on both sides of the Atlantic commended Ancona on his elegant singing style and beautiful voice, with its easy top register and open-throated emission of homogeneous tone. Indeed, the great tenor Jean de Reszke called him the best-schooled Italian baritone of his era. His histrionic skills were less developed however, and he was not considered to be an especially imaginative or exciting interpretive artist. Physically, he was said to resemble King Edward VII of England because of his pointed beard and ample waistline.

The fact that Ancona was able to establish himself as a major singer in the face of intense competition from a host of other first-class baritones is a testament to his sheer quality as a vocalist. His main Italian rivals in the period between his debut in 1889 and the outbreak of World War I were: Mattia Battistini, Antonio Scotti, Giuseppe Pacini, Antonio Magini-Coletti, Giuseppe Campanari and Giuseppe Kaschmann (born Josip Kasman)—and, from a younger generation of verismo opera-influenced baritones, Titta Ruffo, Riccardo Stracciari, Pasquale Amato, Giuseppe De Luca, Eugenio Giraldoni, Mario Sammarco, Domenico Viglione-Borghesi and the promising newcomer Carlo Galeffi.

== Repertoire ==
Don Juan's Serenade (Pyotr Ilyich Tchaikovsky)

According to the critic Michael Scott, author of The Record of Singing, Ancona's smooth, fluent and refined method of singing pre-dated the verismo movement. His style and technique were particularly well suited to the operas of Verdi, and to the bel canto works composed by Bellini and Donizetti (such as I Puritani, Lucia di Lammermoor and La favorite). Ancona's repertoire of Verdi parts included Germont, Di Luna, Rigoletto, Amonasro and Iago, as well as Don Carlos in Ernani.

Ancona also undertook roles composed by Leoncavallo (Silvio and Tonio), Puccini (Lescaut and Marcello), Mascagni (Alfio and David in L'amico Fritz), Giordano (Gerard in Andrea Chénier), Mozart (Don Giovanni and Figaro) and Wagner (Wolfram, Telramund and even, on occasion, Hans Sachs). He appeared, too, in French operas written by Meyerbeer, Gounod, Bizet and, as we have seen, Massenet, performing such parts as Nevers, Hoël, Scindia, Escamillo, Zurga and Valentin.

== Retirement, death and recorded legacy ==
Ancona was still in good vocal shape when he elected to retire from the stage in 1916. World War One was then reaching its height in Europe, and Ancona was singing with the Chicago opera company at the time. In retirement, he devoted himself to teaching. He died of lung cancer in Florence, Italy, on 23 February 1931. An extensive collection of documents, photographs and other items relating to Ancona's career is preserved at Stanford University's Archive of Recorded Sound in California.

Fortunately, however, Ancona's thoroughbred voice lives on in a series of gramophone recordings which he made during the first decade of the 20th century for Pathé in 1905–06 and, more rewardingly, for the Victor Talking Machine Company in 1907–08. Twenty of his Victor recordings are now available on CD transfers (see below). They consist of several songs as well as operatic arias and duets by Verdi, Bellini, Donizetti, Meyerbeer, Gounod, Bizet, Leoncavallo and Giordano.
