= Ida Quaiatti =

Dalmatian Italian lyric soprano (1890–1962)

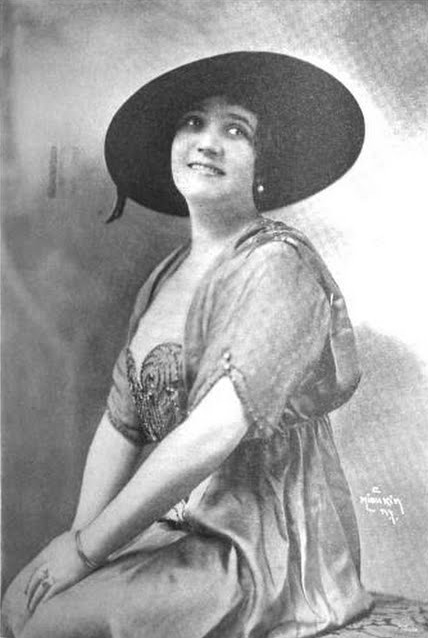
Portrait of Ida Quaiatti taken from an advertisement in The Musical Courier, 1916

Ida Quaiatti (sometimes Cajatti; 1890 – 1 February 1962) was a Dalmatian Italian lyric soprano known especially for her performances in the work of Giacomo Puccini.

== Biography ==
Born in Split, Quaiatti studied music at the conservatory in Trieste, making her operatic debut in that city as Frasquita in Carmen in 1907. Two years later she sang the title role in Madama Butterfly in Ascoli Piceno, and soon thereafter performed in La bohème at the Teatro Sociale in Bergamo. In 1912 she won plaudits for her performance of Amilcare Ponchielli's Lina in Cremona. During her career she would go on to sing in such works as Otello and Falstaff of Giuseppe Verdi; Lohengrin and Der fliegende Holländer of Richard Wagner; La Wally and Loreley of Alfredo Catalani; Lodoletta, Cavalleria rusticana and L'amico Fritz of Pietro Mascagni; Andrea Chénier and Fedora of Umberto Giordano, Mefistofele of Arrigo Boito; and Manon of Jules Massenet. She would eventually perform in most of the major Italian houses. In 1913 she created the role of Mimi in the premiere of Mimi Pinson, the revised version of Ruggiero Leoncavallo's La bohème, in Palermo.

Quaiatti made her Metropolitan Opera debut, under the name "Ida Cajatti", as Musetta in a performance of Puccini's La bohème on November 19, 1915; conductor Gaetano Bavagnoli bowed with the company on the same evening. Other performers in the cast included Frances Alda, Enrico Caruso, and Antonio Scotti. One reviewer described her voice as "light", and spoke unfavorably of her performance. She went on to sing fifteen performances with the Metropolitan over the course of the season. Most were as Musetta, but several were as Nedda in Pagliacci. A review called her performance in the latter role "hardly satisfactory, as her voice was unsteady and her lapses from the pitch very frequent." Other reviews of her season were more favorable. These performances were her only ones with the company.

During World War I Quaiatti sang mainly in Italy, appearing in Turin, Genoa, Rome, Florence, and Naples, where she performed Tosca opposite the Cavaradossi of Beniamino Gigli at the Teatro San Carlo. In 1917, in Rome, she created the title role in the world premiere of Renzo Bianchi's Gismonda, appearing alongside Edoardo Garbin and Domenico Viglione Borghese. She went on to sing at Covent Garden in London, where she debuted in 1920 as Puccini's Manon Lescaut, and at theaters in Budapest, Mexico, Peru, and Chile. Puccini, having heard her in a performance of La bohème, requested that she sing Giorgetta in the premiere of the revised Il tabarro at the Teatro della Pergola in Florence in 1919; she essayed the same role at Covent Garden in 1920. She finished her career with performances of Minnie in La fanciulla del West, her last assumption of the role coming at the Khedivial Opera House in Cairo in 1932. Quaiatti died in Venice. A biography of the soprano by her daughter was published in 1968.
