= Zazà =

Opera by Ruggero Leoncavallo

Cover of piano score, 1919

Zazà (Italian pronunciation: [dzadˈdza]) is an opera by Ruggero Leoncavallo, with a libretto by the composer, which draws on the same material as the French play Zaza (1898). The story concerns the French music hall singer, Zazà, and her affair and subsequent decision to leave her lover, Milio, when she discovers that he is married. The music is influenced by the French music halls where Leoncavallo had spent his early years as a composer.

Its premiere was at the Teatro Lirico in Milan on 10 November 1900, starring Rosina Storchio as Zazà, Edoardo Garbin as Milio, Mario Sammarco as Cascart and Clorinda Pini-Corsi as Anaide, and conducted by Arturo Toscanini. It was later seen in opera houses around the world. Over the following twenty years, it received more than fifty new productions from Palermo to Paris, Buenos Aires to Moscow, Cairo to San Francisco, arriving at the Metropolitan Opera on 16 January 1920 in a production directed by David Belasco and conducted by Roberto Moranzoni, starring Geraldine Farrar, Giulio Crimi and Pasquale Amato, and later, Giovanni Martinelli and Giuseppe De Luca.

La bohème and Zazà were Leoncavallo's most successful operas after Pagliacci, although they are rarely performed today and are relatively unknown except to serious opera enthusiasts.

Dayton Daily News editor Betty Dietz Krebs described Zazà as alternating "between moments of passion and intensity and stretches of comedy" and said that it contains "a string of arias."

Reviews of early performances in New York were indifferent on the music and said the best music was similar to that of Pagliacci. Reviewing an early performance at the Metropolitan Opera in 1920, the New York Tribune stated that the music "is not fresh or original, nor even characteristic of its composer except in places where it is reminiscent of Pagliacci, and even in its best moments it is sadly lacking in distinction; but it challenges praise which must go to the creation of a man who knew his business, knew it thoroughly." Reviewing the Metropolitan premiere, The Standard Union stated that the opera "was best when it most recalled [Pagliacci]." The New York Herald praised Geraldine Farrar's performance in the title role at the Metropolitan premiere, but said that the music "neither illuminates nor interferes with the drama. It is often futile, often a mere blank, but by no means infrequently in excellent accord with the sentiment of the situation. If there are few vocal climaxes, the two or three that exist are theatrically well planned."

== Roles ==
Role	Voice type	Premiere cast, 10 November 1900 (Conductor: Arturo Toscanini )
Zazà, a concert hall singer	soprano	Rosina Storchio
Milio Dufresne, a wealthy Parisian	tenor	Edoardo Garbin
Cascart, a concert hall singer	baritone	Mario Sammarco
Anaide, Zazà's mother	mezzo-soprano	Clorinda Pini-Corsi
Bussy, a journalist	baritone	Lucio Aristi
Natalia, Zazà's maid	mezzo-soprano	Adalgisa Fabbrini
Signora Dufresne, Milo's wife	contralto	Ines Rosalba
Chorus of actors, singers, dancers, stage crew, firemen, etc.
