= Eugenia Burzio =

Italian operatic soprano

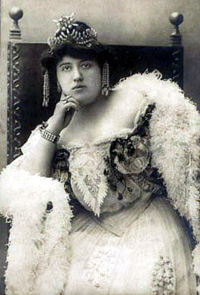
Eugenia Burzio

Eugenia Burzio (20 June 1872 – 16 May 1922) was an Italian operatic dramatic soprano known for her vibrant voice and passionate style of singing. She was particularly prominent in the verismo repertoire, creating the role of Delia Terzaghi in Ruggero Leoncavallo's Goffredo Mameli as well as singing Minnie in the Italian premiere of Giacomo Puccini's La fanciulla del West but was also admired in Verdi and other 19th century repertoire. While many music critics found her interpretations imaginative and exciting, others criticized her for the unevenness of her voice and other technical shortcomings.

== Career ==
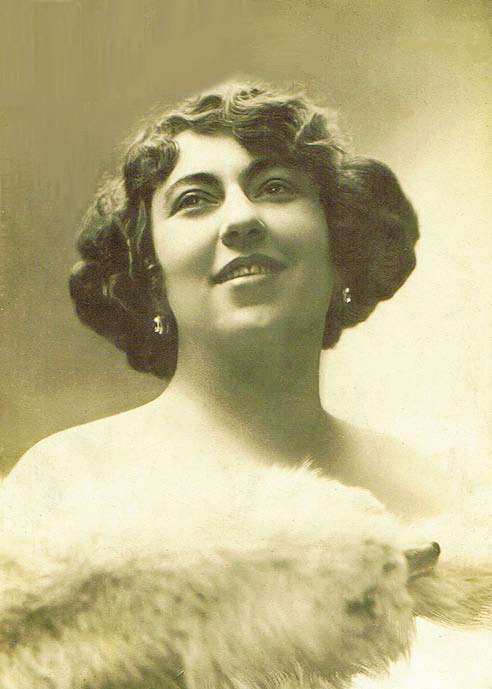

Burzio was born in Poirino, Piedmont on 20 June 1872. Initially, she pursued a career as a violinist; appearing professionally on the concert stage from the time she was nine years old. She also studied painting and piano in her youth. She trained as a singer at the Milan Conservatory with voice teachers Antonio Aversa and Alessandro Guagni Benvenuti. In 1899 she made her professional début as Santuzza in Pietro Mascagni's Cavalleria rusticana at the Teatro Vittorio Emmanuel in Turin. In 1900 she gave performances at the Opéra de Monte-Carlo and Teatro Lirico, Milan; appearing as Rosa Mamai in L'arlesiana at the latter theatre.

Burzio sang through Italy, South America, and in Russia as a specialist in the then new verismo genre of opera; rising to a place as one of Italy's great dramatic sopranos of the early 20th century. In 1904 she was engaged at the Teatro Massimo in Palermo and at the Teatro Regio, Parma. In 1905 she performed at the Theatro Municipal, Rio de Janeiro and the Teatro Colón in Buenos Aires; returning to the latter theater in 1909. She appeared at the Teatro Politeama (Buenos Aires) as Marguerite de Valois in Meyerbeer's Les Huguenots in 1907.

Burio performed regularly at La Scala in Milan from 1905-1912; appearing there as Candia della Leonessa in Franchetti's La figlia di Iorio, Mascagni's Santuzza, and the title roles in Verdi's Aida, Gluck’s Armide, Ponchielli's La Gioconda, Catalani's La Wally, Catalani's Loreley, Bellini’s Norma, Pacini's Saffo, and Puccini's Tosca. She sang several time under conductor Arturo Toscanini at La Scala. Toscanini and a somewhat contentious and quarrelsome relationship with Burzio whom he described as a "wild woman" that when at the top of her form was astounding but at times could be unreliable with note accuracy.

On June 12, 1911 Puccini's La fanciulla del West was given its first performance in Italy at the Teatro Costanzi in Rome to a positive reception; a production which starred Burzio as Minnie. She repeated the role soon after at the Teatro Regio Torino. On November 18, 1912 she returned to the Teatro Lirico in Milan to portray Fleana in Italy's first staging of Leoncavallo's Zingari; a production repeated at the Teatro San Carlo in Naples in February 1913. She later starred in the world premiere Leoncavallo's biographical Mameli based on the life of Italian patriot and poet Goffredo Mameli. This opera premiered on 27 April 1916 at the Teatro Carlo Felice with Burzio as Delia Terzaghi and Carmelo Alabiso in the title role.

Burzio also performed in operas in St. Petersburgh, and at the Teatro Petruzzelli in Bari and the Teatro Massimo Bellini in Catania. Other roles in her repertoire included Katerina Mihaylovna in Alfano's Risurrezione, Leonora in La forza del destino, Maddalena di Coigny in Andrea Chénier, Mimì in La bohème, and the title role in Fedora. In her later career she suffered from nerves and ill-health. Her final stage appearance was in 1919 at the Teatro Lirico in Milan in Ponchielli's Marion Delorme.

Burzio suffered from nephritis. She also had heart disease, and while ill during the last three years of her life was largely cared for by the soprano Rosina Storchio. She died in Milan on May 18, 1922, at the age of forty-nine. Her voice is preserved on recordings made for Fonotipia, Columbia, and Pathé labels which showcase her clear diction and fiery temperament. Grove Music Online stated, "Her recordings show a vibrant voice and a passionate style, which was imaginative and exciting at best but open to many criticisms on grounds of unevenness and over-emphasis." Karl-Josef Kutsch and Leo Riemens described her as possessing a "lush dramatic soprano voice full of passionate creative power, plus an eminent actorial talent on stage".

== Recordings on CD ==
- Eugenia Burzio: Verismo Soprano Complete Recorded Operatic Repertoire (Fonotipia, Milano, 1905–1910; Columbia, Pathé and Phonodisc Mondial, Milano, 1912–1916) Label: Marston Records 52020.
- "Eugenia Burzio:The great dramatic soprano". Renowned producer Keith Hardwick's selection of arias and speeds. Pearl Gemm 9269.
- "The Harold Wayne Collection, Volume 37, Eugenia Burzio, Emma Carelli, Ester Mazzoleni", Symposium 1244.
- "Eugenia Burzio": Legendary voices Preiser PR89723. 2009
- "Eugenia Burzio": 2-CD set Club 99 CL587/88.
