= Silvano (opera) =

Opera by Pietro Mascagni

Silvano is a dramma marinaresco (literally a "seafaring drama") or opera in two acts by Pietro Mascagni from a libretto by Giovanni Targioni-Tozzetti, based on a novel by Alphonse Karr. It received its first performance on 25 March 1895 at La Scala, Milan. Although rarely performed today, the music (if not the drama) is of some technical accomplishment, and when revived, Silvano has been favourably received. The barcarolle from Silvano features prominently in a montage during the Martin Scorsese film Raging Bull.

== Roles ==
Roles, voice types, premiere cast
| Cast | Voice type | Premiere cast, 25 March 1895 Conductor: Rodolfo Ferrari |
|---|---|---|
| Silvano | tenor | Fernando De Lucia |
| Matilde | soprano | Adelina Stehle |
| Renzo | baritone | Giuseppe Pacini |
| Rosa | contralto | Leonilde Ponzano |

== Recordings ==
There has been one studio recording of Silvano, recorded in 1995 and several live recordings, the earliest in 1954, and the most recent in 2003:

- Orchestra Sinfonica della RAI conducted by Pietro Argento with Aldo Bertocci in the title role. Recorded live in Milan, 1954. Label: MRF MRF-81 (part of 3-LP set)
- Orchestra Sinfonica della RAI conducted by Pietro Argento with Gianni Jaia in the title role. Recorded live in Milan, 1973. Label: Foyer ECF-13001 (CD)
- Orchestra del Teatro Goldoni di Livorno conducted by Alberto Gaioni with Angelo Mori in the title role. Recorded live in Livorno, 1980. Label: Fonè 93 F 14 (part of 2-CD set)
- Bohuslav Martinu Philharmonic conducted by Peter Tiboris with Joseph Wolverton in the title role. Studio recording, 1995. Label: Elysium GRK 707 (CD)
- Orchestra Clara Schumann conducted by Mario Menicagli with Maurizio Comencini in the title role. Recorded live in Collesalvetti, 2003. Label: Kicco KC095 (CD).

In addition, the tenor aria "S'è spento il sol (Notturno)" and the ensuing "Barcarola" (used in the film Raging Bull) have been recorded separately a number of times.
