= Charles Silver =

French composer

Charles Silver (16 April 1868 – 10 October 1949) was a French composer.

== Life ==
Born in Paris, Silver studied at the Conservatoire de Paris with Théodore Dubois and Jules Massenet and won the Premier Grand Prix de Rome in 1891 with the lyrical drama L'Interdit. During his stay at the Villa Medici, he composed the opera La Belle au bois dormant in 1895, which was premiered in Marseille in 1902.

His most successful opera was La Mégère apprivoisée after Shakespeare's The Taming of the Shrew, which was on the repertoire of the Paris Opera for some time. He also composed a ballet, an oratorio and several symphonic works.

Silver taught harmony at the Conservatoire de Paris, where Amédée Borsari was one of his students. Since 1900 he was married to the singer Georgette Bréjean-Gravière.

== Works ==
- La Belle au bois dormant, Opera, 1902 in Marseille
- Tobia, Oratorium, 1902 in Marseille
- Poème carnwevalesque, 1906 in Monaco
- Le Clos, Myriane, Opera, 1913 in Nice
- Néigilde, Ballet, 1919 in Monte-Carlo
- La Mégère apprivoisée, Opera (libretto by Henri Caïn and Édouard Adenis)
- La Grand-Mère, Opera, 1930
- Quatre-Vingt-Treize, 1936 in Paris

== Recordings ==
- aria from Myriane, Act III: Air. "Seul, ai-je dit" (Henri) Cyrille Dubois Orchestre National de Lille Pierre Dumoussaud Alpha 2023
- La Belle au bois dormant – Guylaine Girard (Aurore/La Reine), Julien Dran (Le Prince), Kate Aldrich (La Fée Urgèle), Thomas Dolié (Le Roi), Matthieu Lécroart (Barnabé), Clémence Tilquin (Jacotte/La Fée Primevère), Adrien Fournaison (Éloi); Hungarian National Choir, Hungarian National Philharmonic Orchestra, György Vashegyi (conductor). Recorded Jan 2025. Released as a CD-book: Palazzetto Bru Zane, Cat: BZ1064, 2026. (World premiere recording)
