= Georgette Bréjean-Silver =

French opera singer

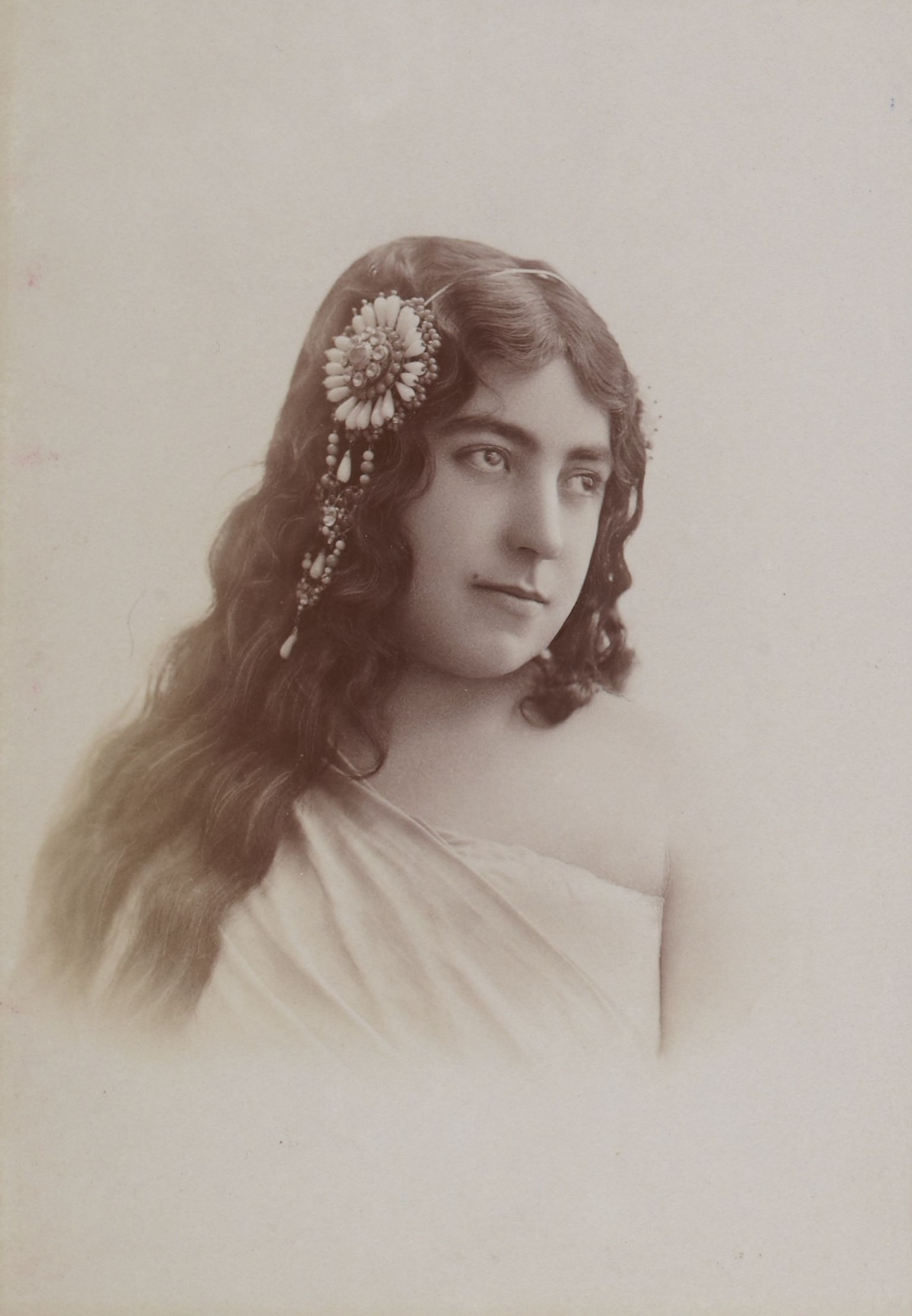
Portrait of Georgette Bréjean-Silver

Georgette Bréjean-Silver (née Georgette-Amélie Sisout; 22 September 1870 – August 1951) was a French opera singer (coloratura soprano).

== Life ==
Born in Paris, Bréjean-Silver studied at the Conservatoire de Paris. In 1890 she made her debut at the Opéra National de Bordeaux, whose director Gravière married her. She had her first great success in the title role of the opera Manon by Jules Massenet at the Opéra-Comique in 1894. She embodied the role so convincingly that Massenet composed an additional gavotte for her for the Brussels premiere of the work.

At the premiere of Massenet's Cendrillon in 1899, Bréjean-Silver sang the role of the fairy. Further important roles were Rosina in Gioacchino Rossini's The Barber of Seville, Philine in Ambroise Thomas' Mignon, Euridice in Glucks's Orfeo ed Euridice, Leila in Georges Bizet's Les pêcheurs de perles and Rosenn in Édouard Lalo's Le roi d'Ys.

From 1900 Bréjean-Silver was married to the composer Charles Silver. Some of her recordings from the years 1905 and 1906 have been preserved by Odeon and Fonotipia Records.

Bréjean-Silver died in Neuilly-sur-Seine in August 1951 aged 80.
