= Adelina Stehle =

Austrian opera singer (1860–1945)

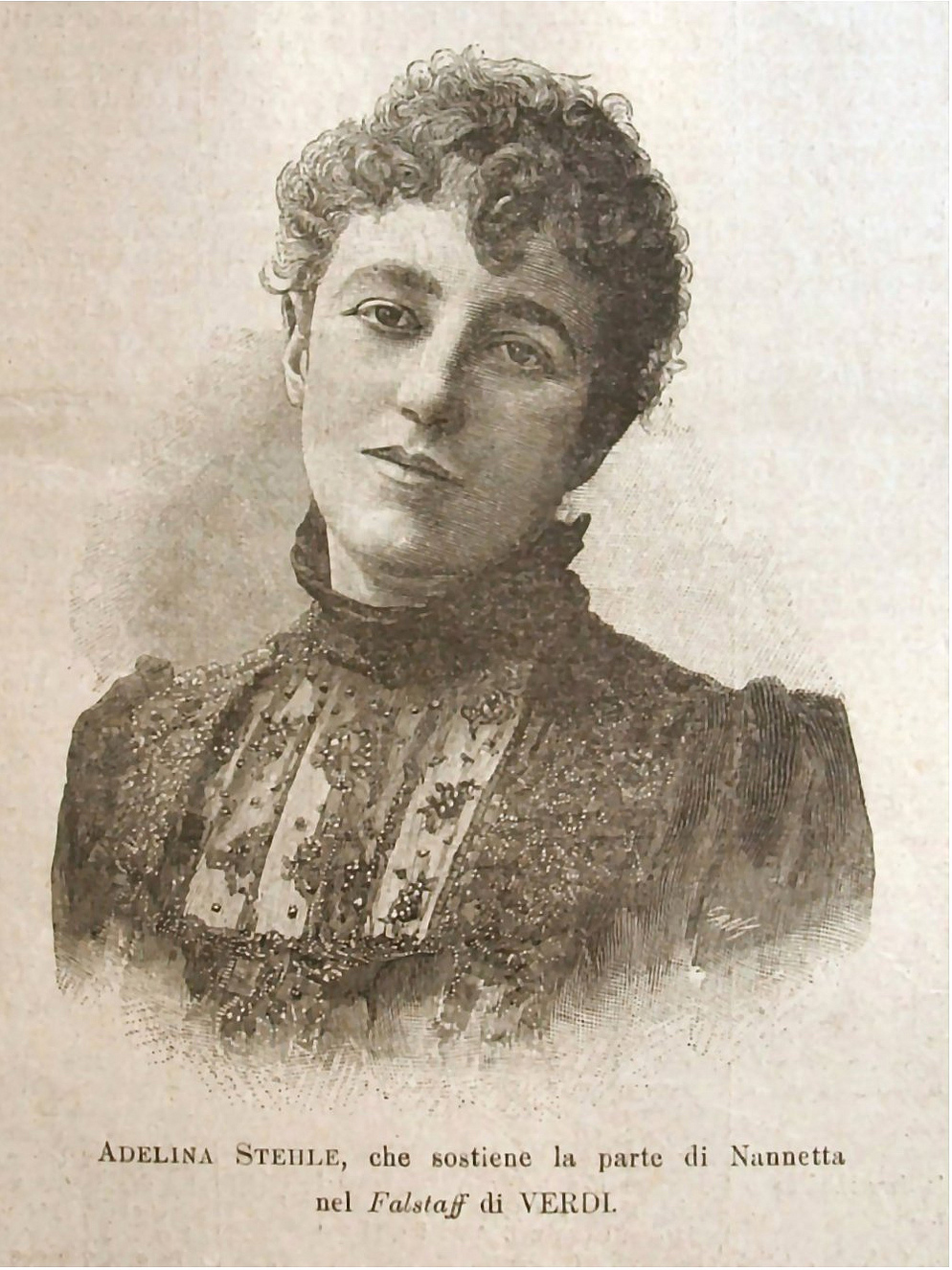
Adelina Stehle as Nannetta in Falstaff

Adelina Stehle (30 June 1860 – 24 December 1945) was an Austrian Empire-born operatic soprano, associated almost entirely with the Italian repertory.

== Biography ==
Born 30 June 1860, in Graz, she studied singing in Milan and debuted as Amina in 1881 in Broni in Lombardy. Her career eventually brought her to La Scala in 1890 where she flourished. She took part in a series of important premieres in the 1890s. In 1893, she was the first Nannetta in Verdi's Falstaff to the Fenton of her husband, Edoardo Garbin, and they were later important in the popularization of Puccini's La bohème.

In 1902, she went to South America before singing in Paris with the Sonzogno Company, as well as in Berlin, Vienna and Saint Petersburg. She became identified with the heavier roles of Italian verismo opera such as Adriana Lecouvreur and Fedora.

When she retired from the stage she became a noted teacher. Among her pupils was Giannina Arangi-Lombardi. She died on 24 December 1945, in Milan.

== Roles created ==
- Walter in Alfredo Catalani's La Wally (La Scala, Milan, 1892)
- Nedda in Leoncavallo's Pagliacci (Teatro Dal Verme, Milan, 1892)
- Nannetta in Verdi's Falstaff (La Scala, Milan, 1893)
- Fioretta de' Gori in Leoncavallo's I Medici (Teatro dal Verme, Milan, 1893)
- Maria in Mascagni's Guglielmo Ratcliff (La Scala, Milan, 1895)
- Matilde in Mascagni's Silvano (La Scala, Milan, 1895)

== Recordings ==
Stehle made a number of recordings for the Fonotipia Company in 1905 but only two recordings were published (both concerted pieces), which according to J. B. Steane "reveal little about her voice and art".
