= Heaven over the Marshes =

1949 film directed by Augusto Genina

- Film poster
- Directed by: Augusto Genina
- Written by: Suso Cecchi D'Amico; Elvira Psorulla; Fausto Tozzi; Augusto Genina
- Produced by: Carlo José Bassoli; Renato Bassoli
- Starring: Rubi D'Alma; Michele Malaspina; Domenico Viglione Borghese; Inés Orsini
- Cinematography: G. R. Aldo
- Edited by: Otello Colangeli; Edmond Lozzi
- Music by: Antonio Veretti
- Production company: Film Bassoli
- Release date: 24 November 1949
- Running time: 111 minutes
- Country: Italy
- Language: Italian

Heaven over the Marshes (Italian: Cielo sulla palude) is a 1949 Italian historical melodrama film directed by Augusto Genina and starring Rubi Dalma, Michele Malaspina, Inés Orsini and Domenico Viglione Borghese. The film portrays the life of the saint Maria Goretti. Augusto Genina was awarded the Nastro d'Argento for Best Director for the film. In 2008, the film was included on the Italian Ministry of Cultural Heritage's 100 Italian films to be saved, a list of 100 films that "have changed the collective memory of the country between 1942 and 1978". The film's sets were designed by Virgilio Marchi.

== Cast ==
- Rubi D'Alma as La contessa Teneroni
- Michele Malaspina as Il conte
- Domenico Viglione Borghese as Il dottore
- Inés Orsini as Maria Goretti
- Assunta Radico as Assunta Goretti - La madre di Maria
- Giovanni Martella as Luigi Goretti - il padre di Maria
- Mauro Matteucci as Alessandro Serenelli
- Francesco Tomalillo as Giovanni Serenelli - il padre di Serenelli
- María Luisa Landín as Lucia
- Ida Paoloni as Teresa
- Federico Meloni as Angelo
- Jole Savoretti as Anna
- Giovanni Sestili as Mariano
- Vincenzo Solfiotti as Antonio

== Bibliography ==
- Moliterno, Gino. The A to Z of Italian Cinema. Scarecrow Press, 2009.
