= Maria Barrientos =

Spanish singer (1884–1946)

María Barrientos
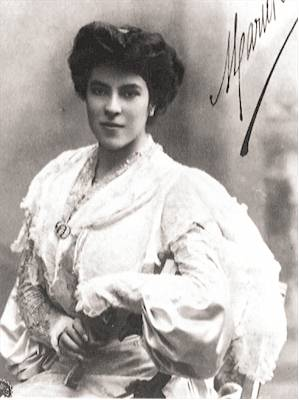
- Born: María Alejandra Barrientos Llopis; 4 March 1884; Barcelona, Spain
- Died: 8 August 1946 (aged 62); Ciboure, France
- Occupation: Operatic soprano

María Alejandra Barrientos Llopis (4 March 1884 – 8 August 1946) was a Spanish opera singer, a light lyric coloratura soprano.

== Biography ==
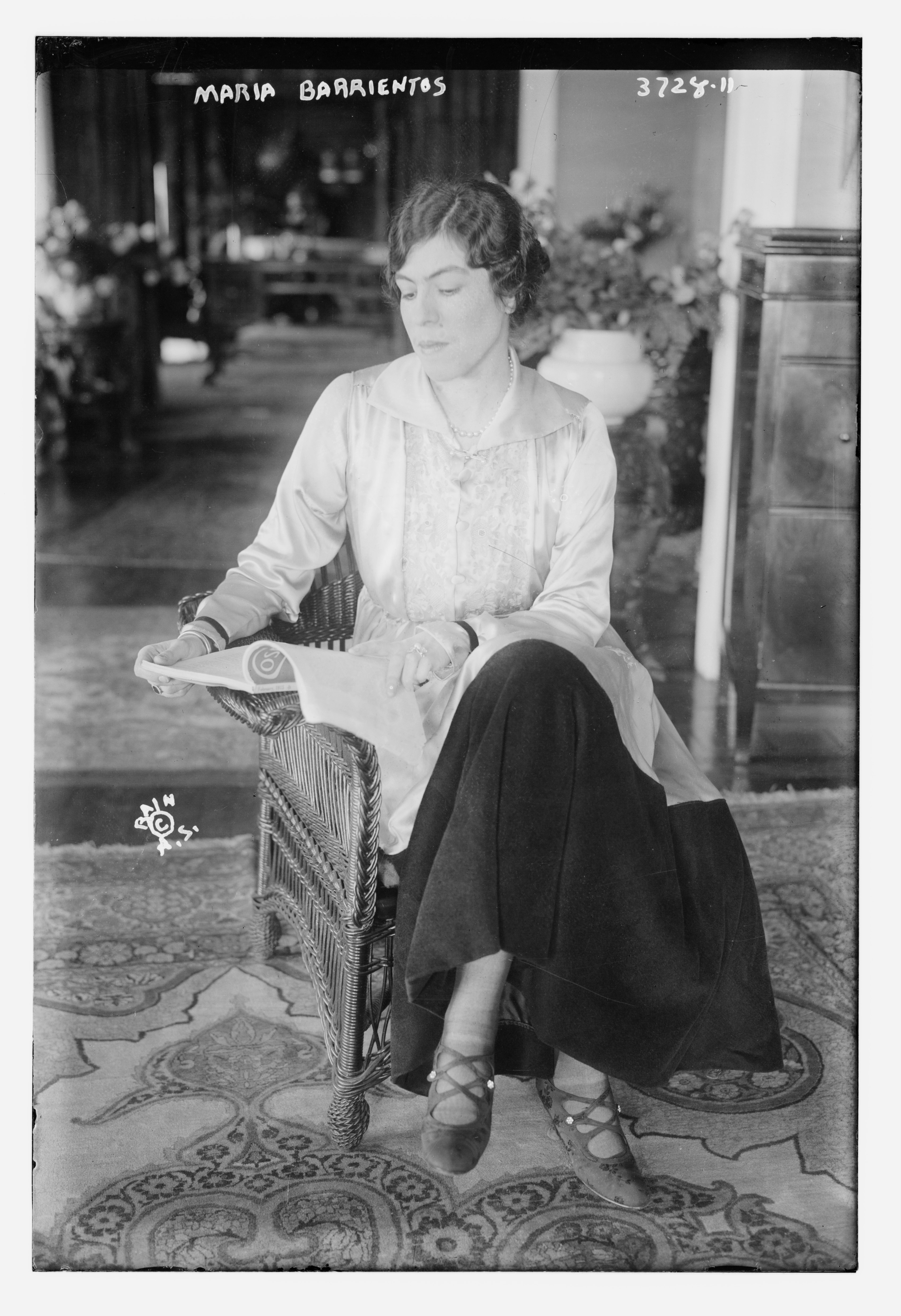
María Barrientos circa 1915

Barrientos was born in Barcelona on 4 March 1884. She received a thorough musical education (piano and violin) at the Municipal Conservatory of Barcelona, before turning to vocal studies with Francisco Bonet. She made her debut at the Teatro Novedades in Barcelona, as Ines in L'Africaine, on March 10, 1898, aged only 15, quickly followed by the role of Marguerite de Valois in Les Huguenots.

She was immediately invited to all the major opera houses of Europe, singing in Italy, Germany, England, France, Ukraine (Odesa) to great acclaim. It is however in South America, especially at the Teatro Colón in Buenos Aires, that she enjoyed her greatest triumphs. She sang there during five seasons between 1911 and 1921, and performed in 13 different operas, including in particular Lucia di Lammermoor, La sonnambula and The Barber of Seville. Her career was temporarily interrupted in 1907 by her marriage and the birth of a son, the union did not prove a happy one and she returned to the stage in 1909.

Barrientos made her Metropolitan Opera debut on January 31, 1916, in the title role of Lucia di Lammermoor with Giovanni Martinelli as Edgardo, Pasquale Amato as Enrico, and Gaetano Bavagnoli conducting. She remained committed to that house through 1920 where her other roles included Adina in L'elisir d'amore, Amina in La sonnambula, Elvira in I puritani, Gilda in Rigoletto, Rosina in The Barber of Seville, and the title roles in Lakmé and Mireille. She notably portrayed The Queen of Shemakha in Nikolai Rimsky-Korsakov's The Golden Cockerel for the opera's United States premiere on March 6, 1918. Her Met career came to an end on May 1, 1920, with a tour performance of L'elisir d'amore opposite Enrico Caruso.

Barrientos continued appearing on stage in standard coloratura roles until 1924. She then restricted herself to recitals, and became an admired interpreter of French and Spanish songs. Barrientos was a singer with a voice of almost instrumental limpidity.

She retired to the south-west of France, where she became an enthusiastic bridge player. She died at Ciboure on 8 August 1946.

== Recordings ==
She made a valuable set of recordings for Fonotipia Records and Columbia Records.

She recorded Falla's Siete canciones populares españolas with the composer at the piano.
