= Amédée Borsari =

French composer

- Born: December 23, 1905; Paris, France
- Died: June 21, 1999 (aged 93); Eaubonne, Val-d'Oise, France
- Education: Conservatoire de Paris, Schola Cantorum de Paris
- Occupation: composer
- Notable work: Eudaïmon-Symphonie, Concerto for piano and orchestra "Américain", La Cathédrale meurtrie

Amédée Borsari (23 December 1905 – 21 June 1999) was a French composer.

== Life ==
Born in Paris, Borsari began piano studies with Georges Falkenberg, and harmony with Charles Silver at the Conservatoire de Paris. He then worked with Vincent d'Indy at the Schola Cantorum de Paris. Abandoning the principles of the schola in the mid-1930s, he composed in a clear and sober style that is in keeping with the French tradition of the first half of the 20th century. His work has been awarded several prizes.

Borsari died in Eaubonne (Val-d'Oise).

== Main works ==
- 3 string quartets
- Prélude pour la mort de Roland, (1940–41), for orchestra
- Histoires enfantines, for soprano and orchestra (1942)
- Quintet with piano
- Eudaïmon-Symphonie (1946)
- Paysage d'été (1948)
- La Grande Place (1952)
- La Cathédrale meurtrie (1955)
- Concerto for piano and orchestra "Américain" (1941)
- 2nd concerto for piano (1946)
- Concerto for saxophone and string orchestra (1947)
- 3rd concerto for harpsichord or piano, and 11 instruments (1950)

== Sources ==
- Dictionnaire de la Musique, Marc Honegger, éd. Bordas, 1986
