= Domenico Viglione Borghese =

Italian operatic singer

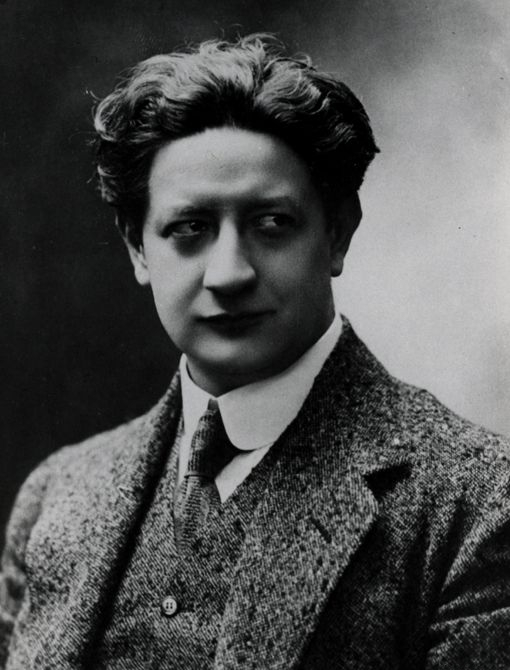
- Born: 13 July 1877; Mondovì, Piedmont, Kingdom of Italy
- Died: 26 October 1957 (aged 80); Milan, Lombardy, Italy
- Occupation: Operatic baritone

Domenico Viglione Borghese (13 July 1877 – 26 October 1957) was an Italian operatic baritone and actor.

== Early life ==
Born in Mondovì, he gave up his studies in medicine to dedicate himself to the study of singing, first in Milan and later with Luigi Leonesi at Conservatorio Rossini in Pesaro, where he was admitted in 1896. He made his début in 1899 at the Teatro Verdi in Lodi as the Herald in Lohengrin. Though he continued working in small, provincial theaters, he soon gave up opera, saying that he did not care "for the atmosphere and intrigues."

== America ==
Shortly thereafter he emigrated to America to join the Klondike Gold Rush but was unsuccessful there. After about three years, he moved to San Francisco, where he worked as a bottle washer, waiter, as a navvy on the railroad, and on the docks. A 1904 San Francisco directory shows him residing at 700 Broadway in San Francisco's Chinatown. He continued taking lessons and singing here and there and by a stroke of fortune was heard by Enrico Caruso, who recommended to the impresario Scognamiglio that he engage Viglione Borghese in his traveling opera troupe, whose prima donna was Luisa Tetrazzini. He sang on their 1906–1906 tour of Mexico, the Caribbean, and South America and from his successes during these performances, he was able to return to Italy at the end of 1906 to pursue an operatic career once more.

== Operatic career ==
His major stage debut was as Amonasro in a 1907 production of Aida at the Teatro Regio in Parma. The power and size of his voice created a sensation, and he soon was alternating Amonasro with Marcello in La bohème and Gerard in Andrea Chénier. About Viglione Borghese's impact on the Italian opera scene, Edgar Herbert-Caesari said:

Talking of baritones, it was in 1908 in Rome that I first heard, in Aida, the biggest baritone voice of all time: Viglione Borghese. (His records are very poor imitations and give no clue whatever to the opulence of that colossal voice.)[...] When he came out as the father Amonasro in Aida in 1909 in Rome he looked a picture. I can still see him with the mind's eye. An aquiline nose, big eyes, muscular body, with a brass band round his black wig and two short horns sticking out on either side of the head, and just a leopard skin, a real one, covering his chest and loins. When it came to the King asking him : "Dunque tu sei?" (Who are you?) he answered with "Suo padre" (Her father). Well that AH in padre, sung on D natural, fourth line, was something. Never, repeat *never* have I heard a bigger and better sound, of real beauty too, than that which came out of Borghese's throat. It literally flooded the opera house. The whole audience rose as one man to applaud and applaud. Even the 120 members of the orchestra and conductor joined in the enthusiasm. It stopped the show for a while. Borghese simply bowed his acknowledgment and motioned for the orchestra to continue. That really stupendous D natural was not the product of belly-thrust (pace the diaphragmatic fiends). When it came to the Nile duet with Aida, in the phrase "Non sei mia figlia" (You are not my daughter any more) those G flats were colossal and something to think about. The power and spontaneity of it all. You should have heard the applause! At the time, I was correspondent for the Musical Times and three American papers too and I remember writing about Viglione Borghese that he would "make three of Titto Ruffo" ! That was no exaggeration. It seems incredible that such power, *liquid* power, could come from a human throat, capped with beautiful, apparently effortless, tone.

— Edgar F. Herbert-Caesari, 1969, Vocal truth: some of the things I teach

By 1910 Viglione Borghese had reached La Scala, where he made his début as Nelusko in L'africana and later created the role of Guarca in Spyridon Samaras's Rhea. Thereafter his international career accelerated; he began to sing at many of the major European houses and became a house favorite at the Teatro Colón in Buenos Aires.

In 1911, he created the role of the sheriff Jack Rance in the Italian premiere of Puccini's La fanciulla del West. This was Viglione Borghese's workhorse role for the rest of his career. He had so much success in it that Puccini himself referred to him as "il mio sceriffo."

In 1912 he married Claudia Nappi, daughter of the Milanese music critic of La Perseveranza. In 1917, in Rome, he appeared in the world premiere of Renzo Bianchi's Gismonda alongside Ida Quaiatti and Edoardo Garbin.

He continued singing until age 64, retiring in 1940 with some 70 roles in his repertoire, primarily comprised by Verdi and verismo literature. He lived in Milan, where he taught voice until he died in 1957.

== Recordings ==
Viglione Borghese’s published recordings were for Fonotipia Records from 1909 to 1910 and for Polydor Records around 1924. Only fairly recently was it discovered that he made two unpublished disc recordings Edison Records in London in 1911. Marston Records issued these on their two volumes of The Edison Legacy: Unpublished Treasures of the Edison Archive.

== Actor ==
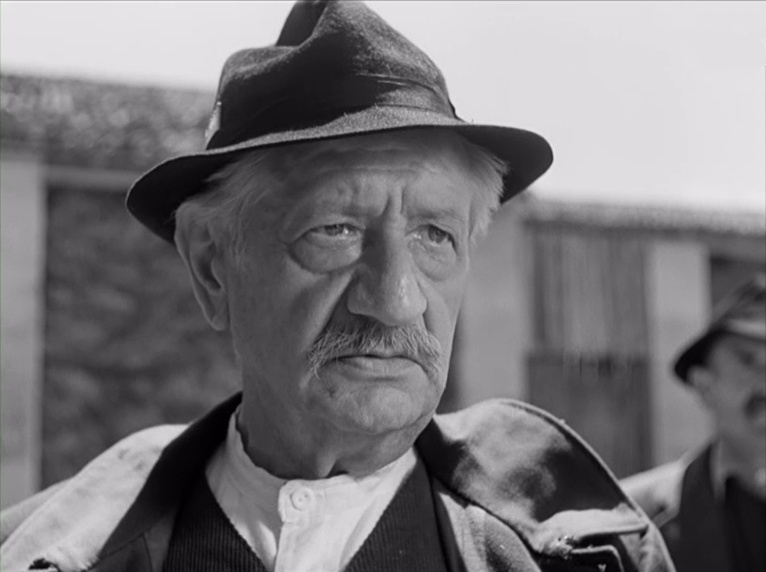
in film Il mulino del Po (1949)

Viglione Borghese, convinced by Mario Soldati to try his hand at acting in films, debuted in a small role in that director's Piccolo mondo antico in 1941. Over the next eleven years, Viglione Borghese took on similar modest character roles in another twenty films.

=== Filmography ===
- Piccolo mondo antico
- L'amore canta
- Fedora (1942)
- The Son of the Red Corsair (1943)
- Giacomo the Idealist (1943)
- Gli ultimi filibustieri
- L'amico delle donne
- La primadonna
- Piruetas juveniles
- L'abito nero da sposa
- Il ventesimo duca
- Genoveffa di Brabante
- Manù il contrabbandiere
- L'ultima cena
- Giudicatemi!
- The Mill on the Po (1949)
- Heaven Over the Marshes (1949)
- Hand of Death (1949)
- The Mistress of Treves (1952)
- Ho sognato il paradiso
- Il Diavolo in convento
- Mistress of Treves
