= Edoardo Garbin =

Italian opera singer

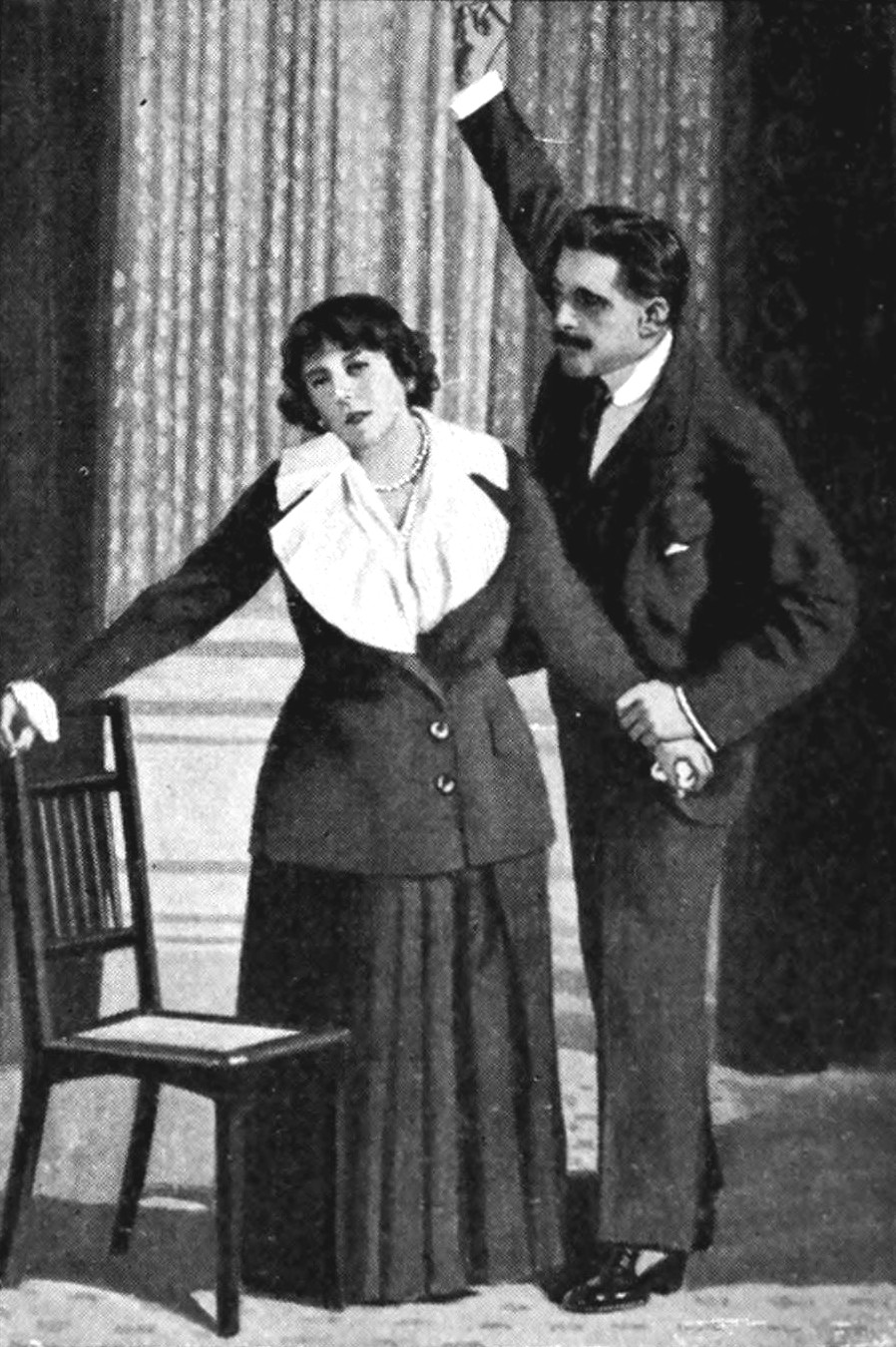
Edoardo Garbin and Rosina Storchio in Zazà

Edoardo Garbin (12 March 1865 – 12 April 1943) was an Italian operatic lirico-spinto tenor. He was married to the soprano Adelina Stehle.

One of the most important Italian tenors of his day, Garbin created, inter alia, tenor roles in Alberto Franchetti's Cristoforo Colombo, Fenton in Verdi's last opera Falstaff (1893), and Milio in Leoncavallo's Zazà; in 1917, in Rome, he appeared in the world premiere of Renzo Bianchi's Gismonda alongside Ida Quaiatti and Domenico Viglione Borghese. His success in the Anglosphere (such as England) was (put charitably) limited (he was, by The Times, described as "miserable" as Cavaradossi at Covent Garden in 1908); but in the Latin sphere (South America and Italy) he was in constant demand until his retirement in 1918.

He recorded in Milan for G&T (to become His Master's Voice) in 1902 and 1903, Fonotipia from 1904 to 1909, and laterly Columbia about 1913; his recordings for the two last mentioned companies sold very well, and are easily found. According to Scott (Record of Singing 1978) his best record of all is the E un riso gentil from Leoncavallo's Zaza. Garbin represents a "half-way-house" between the older bel canto school and the new verist style.

Garbin's style (according to Steane – The Grand Tradition 1971) is a curious mix of the frail and explosive.

At his death, in 1943, Edoardo Garbin was the last male solo vocal artist to have created a part and worked with Giuseppe Verdi – some fifty years' previously in the composer's Fastaff of 1893. It was a role he had repeated in 1913 at La Scala at the Verdi Centenary Celebrations.

== Roles created ==
- Don Fernando Guevara in Cristoforo Colombo (Alberto Franchetti), Genoa's Teatro Carlo Felice October 6, 1892
- Fenton in Falstaff (Giuseppe Verdi), La Scala, 9 February 1893
- Milio Dufresne in Zazà (Ruggero Leoncavallo), Teatro Lirico Di Milano, 10 November 1900
