= Giuseppe Anselmi =

Italian tenor (1876–1929)

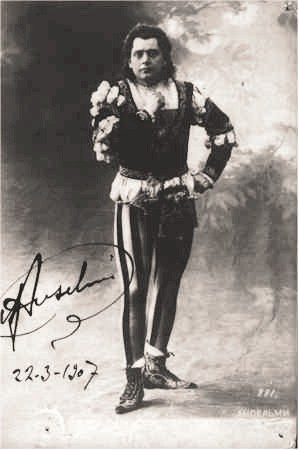
Giuseppe Anselmi as Charles Gounod's Roméo.

Antonio Giuseppe Anselmi (6 November 1876, Nicolosi – 27 May 1929, Zoagli) was an Italian operatic lyric tenor. He became famous throughout Europe during the first decade of the 20th century for his stylish performances of lyric roles. He never sang in the United States.

== Life and career ==
Anselmi came from the Catania area on the east coast of Sicily. He studied violin and piano at the Naples Conservatory as a teenager, and then joined an operetta troupe with which he toured Italy and the Middle East. The music publisher Giulio Ricordi allegedly heard him and advised him to undergo vocal instruction with Luigi Mancinelli, one of Italy's leading conductors.

According to some sources, Anselmi's first appearance on stage in an operatic role happened as early as 1896, when he sang Turiddu (Cavalleria rusticana) in Greece. His Italian operatic debut took place in Genoa in 1900, and his career took off quickly from there. He appeared initially at the Teatro San Carlo, Naples, in late December of that year and, in 1901, at the Royal Opera House, Covent Garden, London. Engagements at La Scala, Milan, and the Monte-Carlo Opera ensued in 1904 and 1908, respectively. He was much admired at the Teatro Colón in Buenos Aires, and also sang in Brussels, Berlin and Vienna prior to World War I.

His greatest triumphs, however, occurred in the cities of St Petersburg (often opposite Lina Cavalieri), Warsaw and, in particular, Madrid, where he even eclipsed the famous tenor Enrico Caruso in popularity.

Although his style of singing was not liked at first by the London critics, he soon became a favorite with audiences in the British capital, and he sang intermittently at Covent Garden until 1909.

Anselmi's operatic career tailed off at the end of World War I; his last known appearances occurred in 1918. He spent his remaining years teaching and composing in Italy. Anselmi died in 1929 of pneumonia, at Zoagli in the Italian province of Liguria. He had retained a deep affection for Madrid, and he bequeathed his heart to that city, where it was exhibited inside an urn at the Teatro Real museum.

== Voice and recordings ==
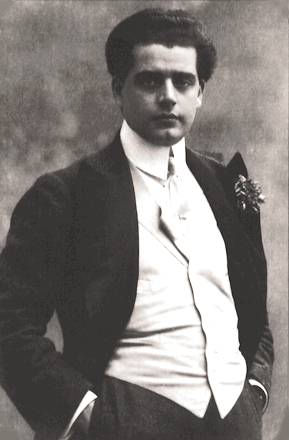
Giuseppe Anselmi

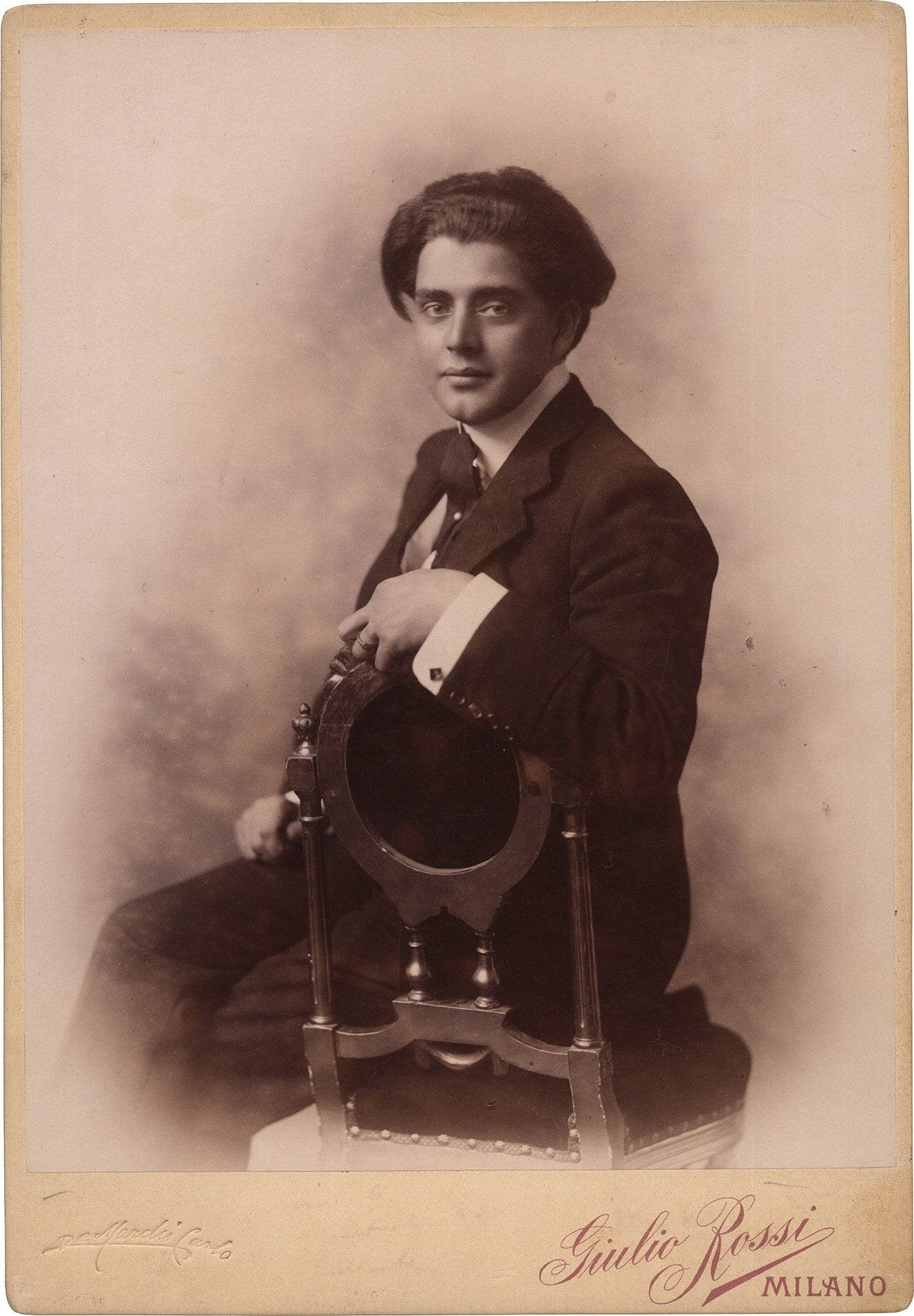
Giuseppe Anselmi

Commentators often describe Anselmi (and his famous contemporary Alessandro Bonci) as being among the last exponents of the old bel canto method of Italian singing, which was largely supplanted in Italy during the early 1900s by a more forceful mode of vocalism associated with Wagner's music dramas and verismo opera.

Anselmi was a good-looking man with an arresting stage presence, which made him extremely popular with many opera-goers. He was sometimes referred to as Il tenore di donne (the tenor of/for women) which may have had a double meaning; details of his personal life have never emerged.

He possessed a sweet-toned if rather throaty and fluttery lyric tenor voice, which he employed with memorable grace and elegance. Anselmi was noted for his performances as Almaviva and Don Ottavio, but he also excelled in the roles of Edgardo, Ernesto (in Don Pasquale), Duca di Mantua, Alfredo, Faust, Enzo, Cavaradossi, Loris and Lensky, among others.

Anselmi recorded for Fonotipia Records in Milan (1907-1910), with excerpts from Don Pasquale, Rigoletto, Pagliacci, Fedora, Werther, Manon, Luisa Miller, Les pêcheurs de perles, Don Giovanni, Cavalleria rusticana, Mignon, L'elisir d'amore, Roméo et Juliette, La bohème, La Gioconda, Il barbiere di Siviglia, Tosca, Iris, Carmen, Manon Lescaut, Lucia di Lammermoor, Eugene Onegin, Lucrezia Borgia, Manru (of Paderewski), La favorite, Mefistofele, Marcella, Così fan tutte, Martha, Il duca d'Alba, Le maschere, "Stabat mater" (of Pergolesi), Verdi Requiem, Serse, Aida, L'africaine, La traviata, Gitana, and various songs; and Edison Records in London (1913), with excerpts from Pagliacci, La Gioconda, La favorite, Les pêcheurs de perles, L'africaine, Lucia di Lammermoor, Mignon, and Cavalleria rusticana.

In 2023, Marston Records published "The Complete Recordings of Giuseppe Anselmi."

== Sources ==
- Le guide de l'opéra, les indispensables de la musique, R. Mancini & J-J. Rouvereux (Fayard, 1986), ISBN 2-213-01563-5
- The Record of Singing, Michael Scott (Duckworth, 1977)
- The Grand Tradition, J.B. Steane (Duckworth, 1974)
- The Concise Oxford Dictionary of Opera (Second Edition), Harold Rosenthal and John Warrack (Oxford University Press, 1980)
- The Record Collector, April 1987.
