= Lodoletta =

1917 opera by Pietro Mascagni

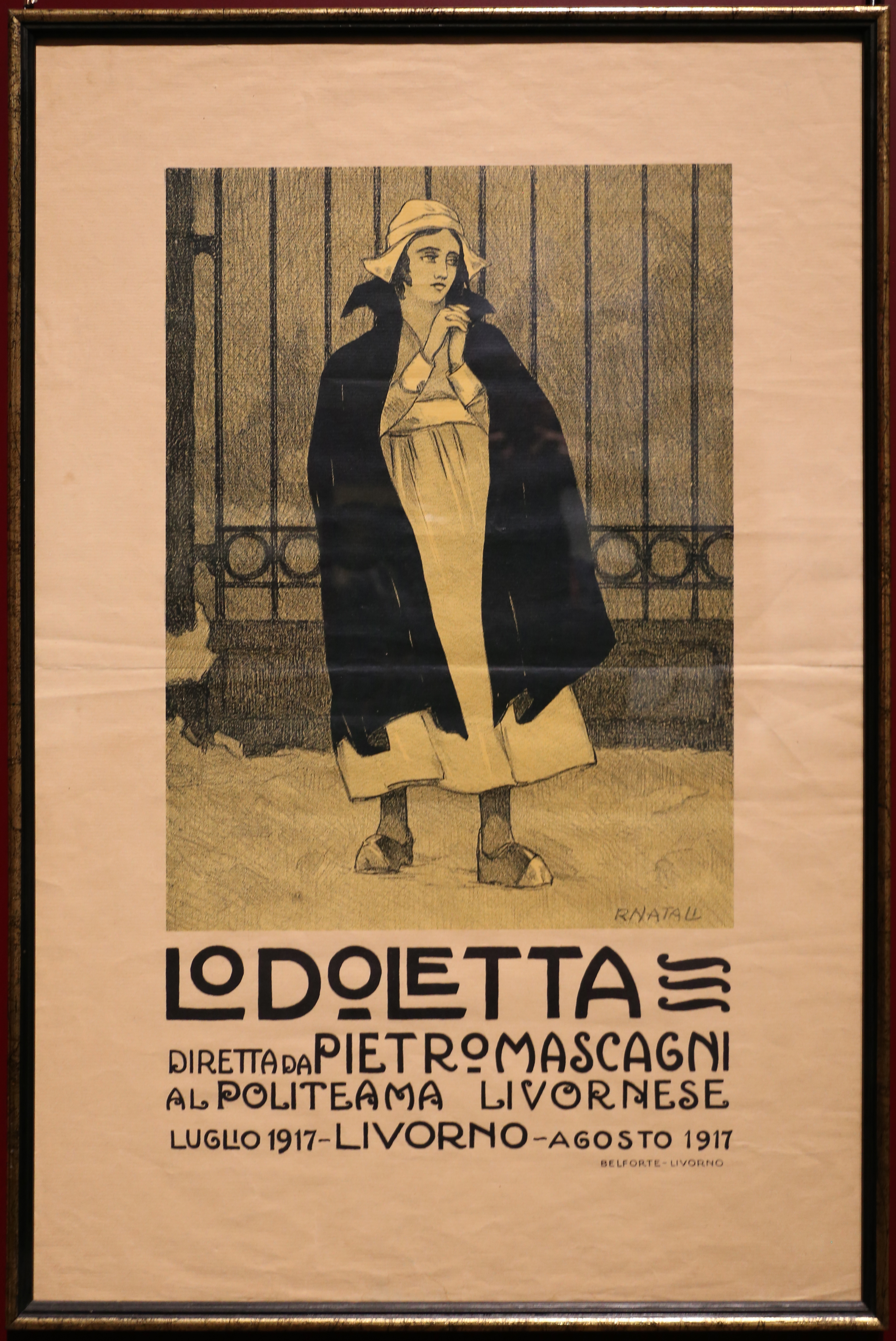
Poster

Lodoletta is a dramma lirico or lyric opera in three acts by Pietro Mascagni. The libretto is by Giovacchino Forzano, and is based on the novel Two Little Wooden Shoes by Ouida (pseudonym of Marie Louise de la Ramée).

== Composition history ==
An auction of her property, including musical rights for Two Little Wooden Shoes, was held to satisfy local creditors when Ouida died in Italy in 1908. Giacomo Puccini attempted to buy them but was outbid by a local tradesman. The winner subsequently resold them to a music publisher, which provided them to Mascagni for development into the opera.

== Performance history ==
It was first performed at the Teatro Costanzi in Rome on 30 April 1917 with Rosina Storchio in the title role. The American premiere was on 12 January 1918 at the Metropolitan Opera, New York City, with Geraldine Farrar as Lodoletta and Enrico Caruso as Flammen.

== Roles ==
Roles, voice types, premiere cast
Role	Voice type	Premiere cast, 30 April 1917 Conductor: Pietro Mascagni
Lodoletta	soprano	Rosina Storchio
La pazza	contralto	Cleofe Braghini
Maud	soprano	Luigia Pieroni
La vanard	soprano	Ida De Filippis
Flammen	tenor	Giuseppe Campioni
Giannotto	baritone	Enrico Molinari
Franz	baritone	Leone Paci
Antonio	bass	Augusto Dadò
A voice/a postman	tenor	Ettore Bonzi

== Plot summary ==
The opera is set in 1853 in Holland and Paris.

Lodoletta, a Dutch orphan, and Flammen, an artist, are lovers, but she leaves him when he suggests they should live together. After he moves to Paris, she has a change of heart and follows him, finally arriving at his house on New Year's Eve, sick and in rags. Seeing a glittering party underway inside, she realizes that they inhabit different worlds and collapses in the snow. Delirious, she imagines he is kissing her and, in the final aria, "Flammen perdonami", begs his forgiveness as she dies of exhaustion.
