= Antonio Magini-Coletti =

Italian opera singer (1855–1912)

Antonio Magini-Coletti (17 February 1855 – 21 July 1912) was a leading Italian baritone who had a prolific career in Europe and the United States during the late 19th century and the early part of the 20th century. A versatile artist, he appeared in several opera world premieres but was particularly associated with the works of Giuseppe Verdi, Richard Wagner and the verismo composers. He was also an accomplished exponent of the bel canto repertoire.

== Biography ==
Magini-Coletti was born in 1855 in the medieval town of Iesi (written Jesi in Italian), which is situated inland from Ancona on central Italy's east coast. Published details of his early life are scant but sources agree that he studied singing during the 1870s with the distinguished pedagogue Venceslao Persichini at Rome's Conservatorio di Santa Cecilia. (Persichini's other students included the lyric tenor Francesco Marconi and Magini-Coletti's fellow baritones Mattia Battistini, Giuseppe De Luca and Titta Ruffo.)

In 1880, Magini-Colleti made his operatic debut at Rome's Teatro Costanzi, as Valentin in Gounod's Faust. He continued to perform regularly at that opera house for the next seven years, in addition to making guest appearances in Venice, Florence, Naples and other Italian cities. In 1887 he joined the roster at La Scala, Milan, remaining there for three seasons and singing a variety of leading baritone roles. Most notably, he appeared as the character Frank in the world premiere of Puccini's second opera, Edgar, in 1889. A year later, he performed his first Count Di Luna in Verdi's Il trovatore at La Scala. This part became an especial favourite of his, and he reprised it in numerous houses during the remainder of his career.

Between 1888 and 1891, Magini-Coletti sang to acclaim in Spain, Portugal, Germany, Austria and France. He also crossed the Atlantic for a series of operatic engagements in Argentina, receiving further plaudits. In 1891 he joined the stellar roster of singers at the New York Metropolitan Opera, participating to begin with in a two-month North American tour. His first performance with the Met touring company occurred on 9 November, in Chicago, as Telramund in Wagner's Lohengrin. His other roles on the 1891 tour included Hoël in Meyerbeer's Dinorah, Count de Nevers in Meyerbeer's Les Huguenots and Amonasro in Verdi's Aida (opposite soprano Lilli Lehmann and tenor Jean de Reszke), not to mention the title part in Mozart's Don Giovanni.

On 14 December 1891, Magini-Coletti made a successful debut at the Metropolitan Opera's headquarters in New York City, singing Capulet in Gounod's Roméo et Juliette. He performed numerous roles at that house over the next 12 months, including Count Di Luna, Alfio in Mascagni's Cavalleria rusticana, Don Pizarro in Beethoven's Fidelio, Escamillo in Bizet's Carmen and Figaro in Rossini's Il barbiere di Siviglia, among others.

Magini-Coletti left America in 1892. He proceeded to pursue a busy schedule of operatic performances in Italy and other European countries, venturing as far afield as Russia and becoming a frequent guest artist at both the Opéra de Monte-Carlo in Monaco and the Royal Opera, Covent Garden, in London. In 1900, he rejoined the La Scala company, performing numerous roles there for three seasons. Most notably, he appeared in the premiere of Mascagni's Le maschere in 1901.

Also in 1901, he sang at La Scala in a memorial concert held to mark the recent death of Verdi, partnering the heroic tenor Francesco Tamagno in a scene from La forza del destino. The following year, he participated in La Scala's first ever production of Weber's Euryanthe. Magini-Colleti sang often under the baton of Arturo Toscanini, La Scala's principal conductor, during this period. Toscanini was an ardent advocate of Wagner's music and he conducted Magini-Coletti in performances of Tristan und Isolde, Die Walküre and Lohengrin. These landmark Wagnerian productions often featured Magini-Coletti's La Scala colleague Giuseppe Borgatti—Italy's best heldentenor.

Other significant operas in which Magini-Coletti appeared during the course of his 30-year European and American career were Donizetti's Lucia di Lammermoor, L'elisir d'amore, La favorita, Poliuto and Lucrezia Borgia, Verdi's Otello, Falstaff, Rigoletto, La forza del destino, Un ballo in maschera, Luisa Miller and La traviata, Puccini's La bohème, Berlioz's La damnation de Faust and Delibes' Lakmé.

He died in Rome, aged 57.

== Recordings ==
Magini-Coletti is one of the earliest Italian-born singers whose voice can still be heard. He made numerous 78-rpm discs of operatic arias, duets and ensembles in Milan for the Zonophone label (in 1902/1903) and for Fonotipia Records (1905–1910). He recorded, too, for the Columbia Graphophone Company. Twenty-two of his Fonotipia recordings have been reissued on CD by Preiser (catalogue number 89518). They show that he possessed a big, vibrant, dark-hued voice of outstanding quality. His breath control was exemplary and he could execute florid music by Rossini or Donizetti with flair and agility due to the thorough technical grounding that he had acquired from Persichini. His Verdi singing also impresses but, oddly enough, he did not record anything from his Wagnerian repertoire, with the exception of one Wagner selection 27 Oct. 1908 for Fonotipia XPh3565 Lohengrin (opera): Vendetta avrò (w. Meitschik), which was never released.
