= Pasquale Amato =

Italian opera singer (1878–1942)

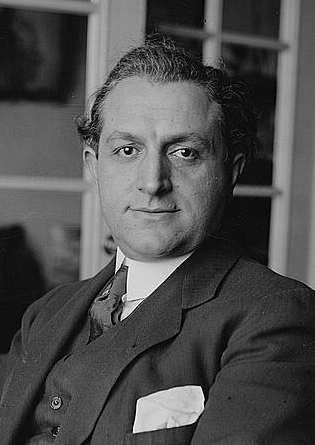
Pasquale Amato

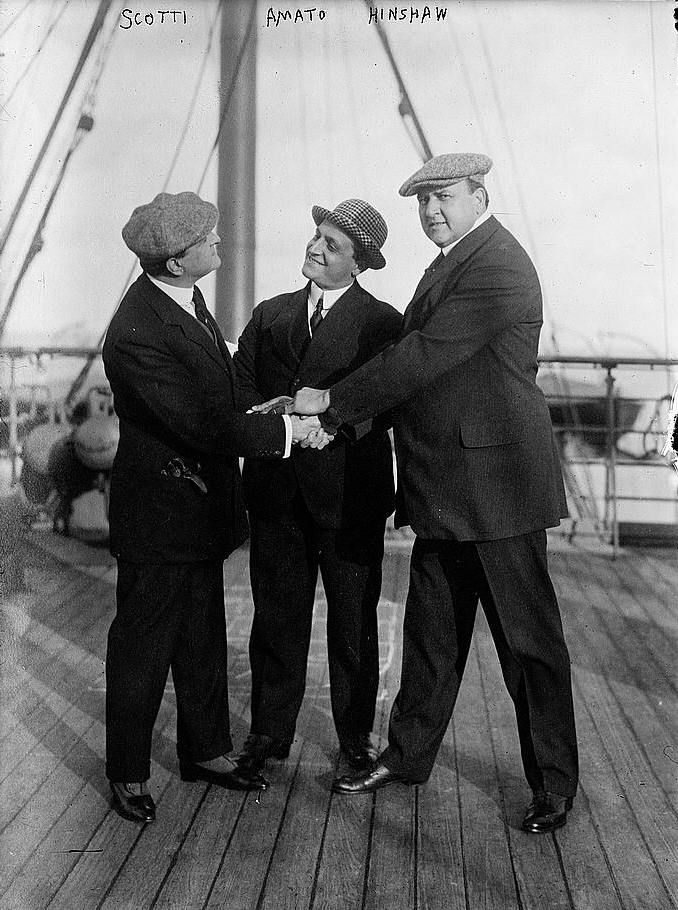
Antonio Scotti, Pasquale Amato, and William Hinshaw aboard the SS George Washington on 29 October 1912

Pasquale Amato (21 March 1878 – 12 August 1942) was an Italian operatic baritone. Amato enjoyed an international reputation but attained the peak of his fame in New York City, where he sang with the Metropolitan Opera from 1908 until 1921.

== Early career ==
Amato was born in Naples and studied locally at the Conservatory of San Pietro a Majella under Beniamino Carelli and Vincenzo Lombardo (who also gave singing lessons to the great Neapolitan tenor Enrico Caruso). In 1900, he made his debut at the Teatro Bellini in Naples as Germont père in La traviata. Engagements followed in Genoa and Rome. Over the next few years he sang in Monte Carlo, Germany, parts of eastern Europe and Argentina. In 1904, he appeared at London's Royal Opera House with the Teatro di San Carlo Company; although well-received, he was not invited back.

He was engaged by La Scala, Milan, and sang there in 1907 under the baton of Arturo Toscanini. His voice had matured by now into a top-class instrument and he was praised for his versatility and artistic integrity. In 1913 he was accorded the honour of taking part in the Verdi centenary commemoration at the Busseto Theatre. He appeared at the commemoration in La traviata and Falstaff with Toscanini conducting. Other important operatic roles which Amato sang in Italy prior to World War I included Amonasro in Aida, Marcello in La bohème, the title part in Rigoletto, as well as Golaud in Pelléas et Mélisande, Kurwenal in Tristan und Isolde, Scarpia in Tosca and Barnaba in La Gioconda.

== New York ==
Amato repeated some of these roles at the Metropolitan Opera, where Toscanini had gone to conduct and where Amato made his debut in 1908. He maintained a taxing performance schedule at the Met until he left the company in 1921, appearing in a number of operatic works that he had not undertaken before. In 1910, for example, he sang in Gluck's Armide, along with Enrico Caruso, Olive Fremstad, Louise Homer and Alma Gluck. In December of that same year, he created the part of Jack Rance in the Met's world premiere of Puccini's La fanciulla del West, singing opposite Caruso, Emmy Destinn, Dinh Gilly and Antonio Pini-Corsi and conducted by Toscanini.

Amato was by now a celebrity, and his return to the United States by ship in October 1912 with fellow baritones Titta Ruffo, Antonio Scotti and William Hinshaw, and soprano Lucrezia Bori, received extensive press coverage.

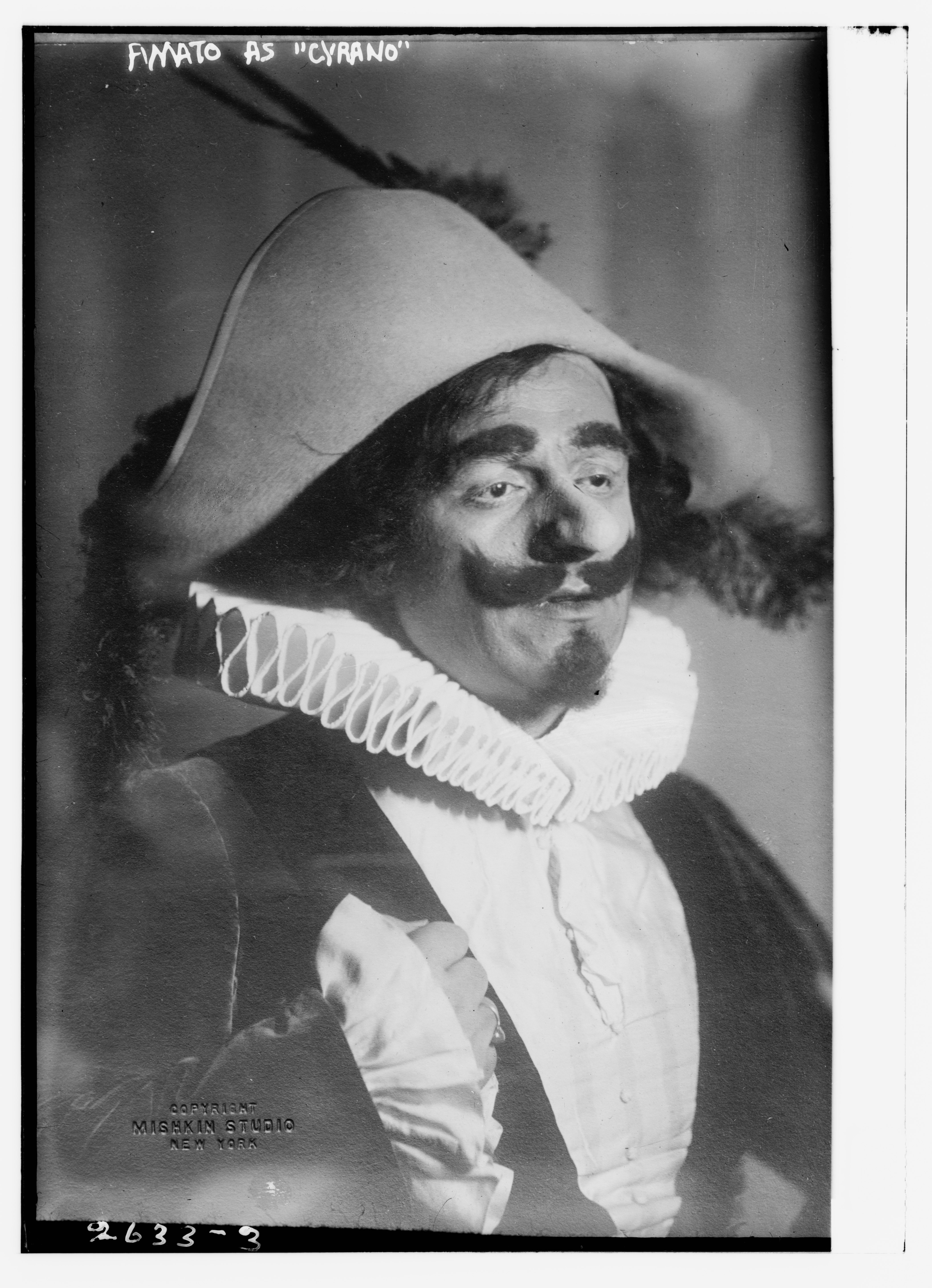
Amato in Cyrano, c. 1913

In 1913, Amato created the title role in Cyrano by Walter Damrosch; Frances Alda and Riccardo Martin were also in the cast. He performed, too, in that year's production of Un ballo in maschera with Caruso, Destinn, Margaret Matzenauer and Frieda Hempel, and with them again in Arrigo Boito's Mefistofele. In La Gioconda, he sang alongside Destinn again, and Margarethe Arndt-Ober. Amato was especially admired as Escamillo in Bizet's Carmen, supporting Geraldine Farrar, Caruso and Alda, when the opera was successfully revived in 1914.

Also in 1914, he performed the part of Manfredo (opposite Adamo Didur and Lucrezia Bori) in Montemezzi's L'amore dei tre re, when that new work came to New York, and in 1915 he created the part of Napoléon in Umberto Giordano's Madame Sans-Gêne, with Farrar as Catherine. In 1916, he gave the premiere American performance of the role of Giovanni in Riccardo Zandonai's Francesca da Rimini (opposite Alda and Giovanni Martinelli), and in 1918 that of Gianetto (with Farrar, Caruso, and Didur) in Mascagni's Lodoletta.

Amato's busy schedule at the Met took its toll on his voice and his health in general. He retired to Italy during the 1920s, to relax and recuperate, but in 1933, 25 years after his American debut, he appeared there again at the New York Hippodrome, singing the role of the elder Germont in La traviata. Amato had an affinity with America and, in 1935, he accepted the position of Head of Studies in voice and opera at the Louisiana State University, where in 1939, he was initiated as an honorary member of the Beta Omega chapter of Phi Mu Alpha Sinfonia fraternity, the national fraternity for men in music. Amato was in poor health during the last few years of his life. He died in 1942 at the age of 64 in Jackson Heights, Queens.

== Appraisal ==
Amato, 1911
"Toreador Song" from Carmen

"Te Deum"
From Tosca, 1914

Amato in his prime possessed a high baritone voice of wide compass. According to Michael Scott in The Record of Singing, it had a ringing and a unique vibrant tone that could not be confused with that produced by any other baritone. Although it was not quite so opulent as the vocal instrument possessed by his contemporary Titta Ruffo, it was still resonant and secure, with carrying power and flexibility. Amato also sang with masterful phrasing and cantabile. In short: he was one of the most distinctive singers of his age.

== Recordings ==
Amato made a number of operatic recordings in America for the Victor Talking Machine Company—including some duets with Caruso, Johanna Gadski and other stars of the Met. His 1914 Victor recording of "Eri tu" (from Un ballo in maschera), for example, is considered by many critics to be the finest version of the aria ever committed to disc.

Prior to his contract with Victor, Amato had made a series of discs in Italy for Fonotipia, which included operatic arias and a remarkably intimate "A Sirena" (a Neapolitan song). Later, in 1924, he made an obscure (and poorly recorded) group of records for the Homophone company. Amato made just one known electrical recording—the live-recorded soundtrack of the 1927 Vitaphone short, "A Neapolitan Romance," which featured Amato performing "Torna a Surriento" and the Toreador song from Carmen, sung in Italian. Both sound only and motion-picture versions of the former have recently surfaced. Amato also appeared in a non-singing role in a Warner Bros. Pictures motion picture, playing Napoleon in 1928's mostly-silent film Glorious Betsy.

== Awards ==
As well as receiving honours from the Italian government, Amato was initiated as an honorary member of the Beta Omega chapter of Phi Mu Alpha Sinfonia, at Louisiana State University in 1939.

== Notes ==
=== Sources ===
- Kobbé, Gustav (1935). The Complete Opera Book. London: Putnam.
- Scott, Michael (1977). The Record of Singing. Vol. I. London: Duckworth Books.
