= Alessandro Bonci =

Italian opera singer

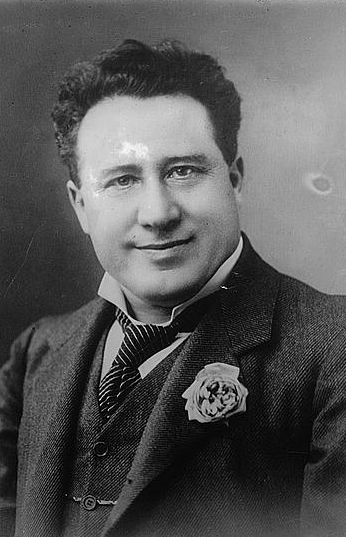
- Bonci in 1911
- Born: February 10, 1870; Cesena, Kingdom of Italy
- Died: August 10, 1940 (aged 70); Rimini, Kingdom of Italy

Alessandro Bonci (February 10, 1870 – August 9, 1940) was an Italian lyric tenor known internationally for his association with the bel canto repertoire. He sang at many famous theatres, including New York's Metropolitan Opera, Milan's La Scala and London's Royal Opera House, Covent Garden.

== Biography ==
A native of Cesena, Romagna, Bonci started out as an apprentice shoemaker. He secured a music scholarship to the Rossini Conservatory in Pesaro, working for five years with Carlo Pedrotti (the teacher of the heroic tenor Francesco Tamagno) and then Felice Coen. He also had private singing lessons in Paris with the retired baritone Enrico Delle Sedie.

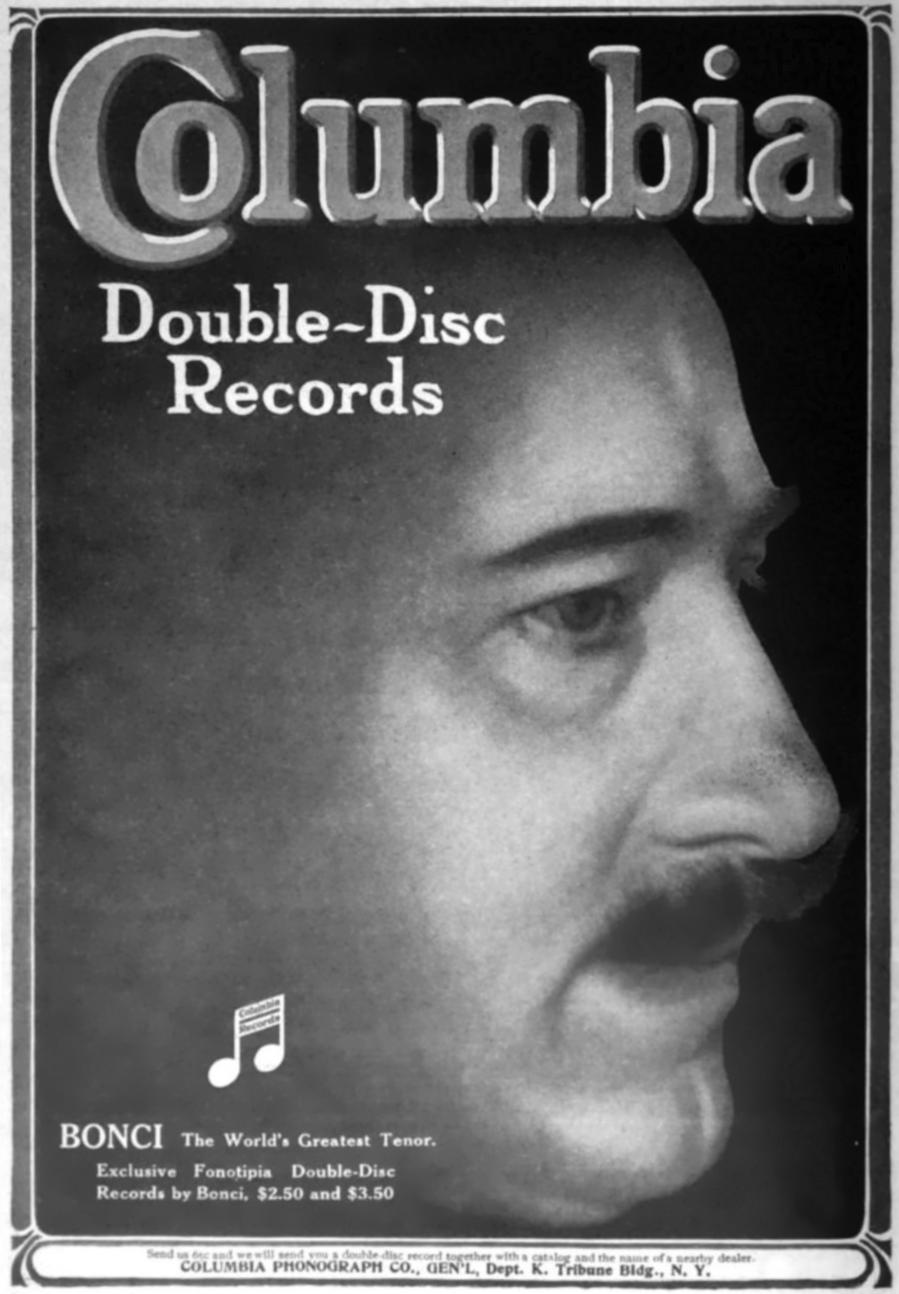
Bonci featured in a 1910 Columbia Phonograph advertisement.

Alessandro Bonci made his debut in Parma in 1896, singing the role of Fenton in Giuseppe Verdi's Falstaff at the Teatro Regio. Before the end of his first season he was engaged to sing at La Scala, Milan, where he debuted in Vincenzo Bellini's I Puritani. Appearances elsewhere in Europe followed, including at London's Royal Opera House, Covent Garden. He first sang at Covent Garden in 1900 and he would return there in 1903 and 1907-08.

On December 3, 1906, Bonci made his American debut with the Manhattan Opera Company in New York City; again the opera was I Puritani. He stayed two seasons with the company, becoming a popular competitor to Enrico Caruso, who was the rival Metropolitan Opera's major drawcard. Bonci himself joined the Metropolitan Opera in 1908 and, in 1914, the Chicago Opera. He also made a transcontinental tour of America in 1910-11, giving song recitals.

Bonci served in the Italian army during World War I, returning to America to tour for three seasons after the end of the conflict. He appeared again at the Metropolitan Opera, and sang in Chicago during the 1920-21 season. In 1922 and 1923 he served as the principal tenor of the Teatro Costanzi in Rome and conducted master classes across the United States the following year. After 1925, Bonci entered into partial retirement, devoting himself primarily to teaching in Milan. He still sang occasionally in public as late as 1935.

He died in Viserba, Rimini, in 1940, at the age of 70.

== Recordings ==
Bonci's artistry was captured on disc by the Fonotipia, Edison and Columbia companies. His first recordings were made in 1905 and his last in 1926, with a handful produced between these dates (in 1913). He is heard to best advantage in operatic arias by Bellini, Rossini, Donizetti and Gluck, but he was also renowned in Europe and the United States for his Rodolfo in Puccini's La boheme, his Riccardo in Verdi's Un ballo in maschera and his Duke of Mantua in Verdi's Rigoletto.

== Voice ==
Bonci was a demure man and his voice was not overly large. It was sweet-toned, stylish and supple, with excellent high notes and an easy high C. He sang with what at the time would have been considered a standard vibrato, though later generations (until our own) preferred a slower one.
