= Rosina Storchio =

Italian opera singer (1872–1945)

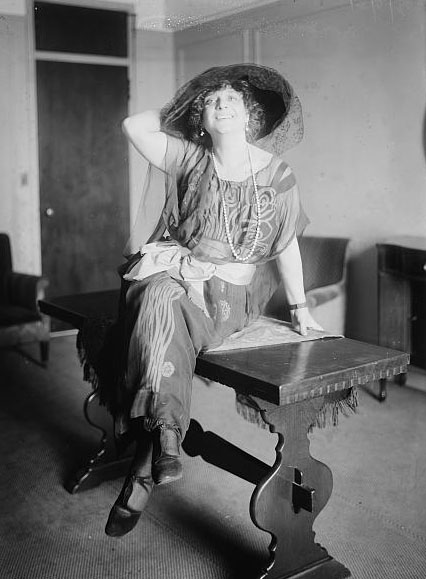
Rosina Storchio

Rosina Storchio (19 January 1872 – 24 July 1945) was an Italian lyric coloratura soprano who starred in the world premieres of operas by Puccini, Leoncavallo, Mascagni and Giordano.

== Biography ==
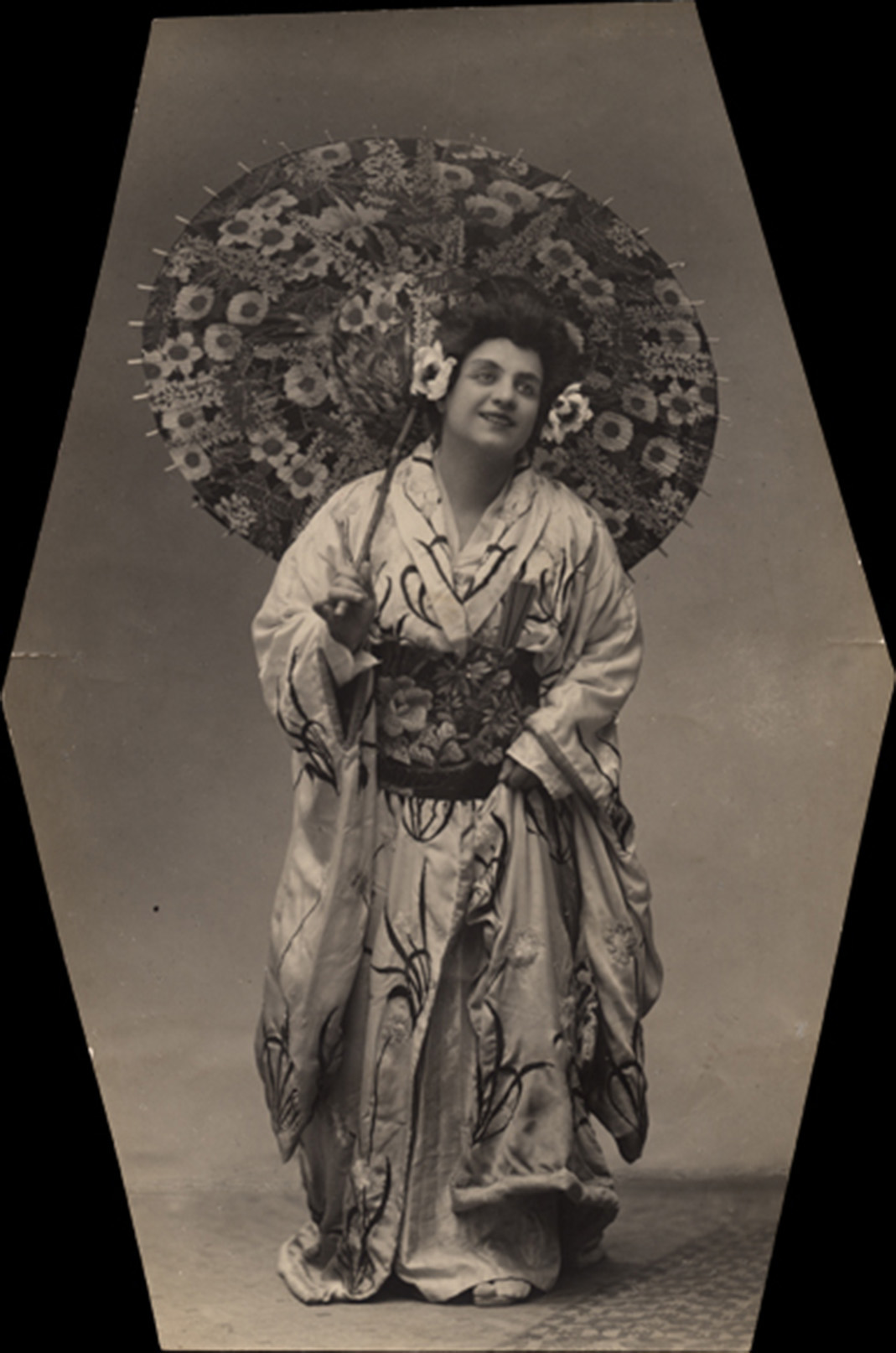
Rosina Storchio was the first Madama Butterfly in 1904 in Milan

Born in Venice in 1872, Storchio studied at the Milan Conservatory before making her operatic debut as Micaëla in Bizet's Carmen at Milan's Teatro Dal Verme in 1892. Three years later, she debuted at Italy's most famous opera house, La Scala, Milan, performing in Massenet's Werther. She sang Violetta at La Scala in 1906, the first performance of the opera in contemporary dress.

Milan became her home base from then on, but she also appeared during the pre-World War I period at theatres in other key Italian cities, including Rome and her native Venice. She toured South America and Spain, too, and undertook singing engagements in Paris and Moscow, unwisely attempting parts as heavy as that of the title role in Puccini's Tosca.

Storchio sang in the first performance of Madama Butterfly in the world outside Italy. She performed the role in July 1904 in Buenos Aires, just a few months after the world premiere in Milan, conducted by Arturo Toscanini. In 1905, Storchio sang Madama Butterfly again in Buenos Aires, on occasion of Puccini's visit to the Argentine capital and in the presence of the composer, with Giovanni Zenatello (who had performed the role of Pinkerton in the world premiere) and Enrico Nani.

In 1921, by which time her voice was in marked decline, she sang in Chicago and New York City. Her final public performance was as Cio-Cio San in Puccini's Madama Butterfly in Barcelona in 1923. (She had sung this same part in the first performance of Butterfly, at La Scala, in 1904.) After retiring from the stage she taught singing in Milan. One of her pupils was soprano Franca Somigli.

Storchio died in Milan near the end of World War II. She left a small legacy of 78-rpm gramophone recordings made during the early years of the 20th century. These recordings (reissued since on CD) include extracts from verismo opera—the repertoire with which she was most closely associated—as well as arias from the bel canto repertoire, She did, however, also appear on stage in a few French operas and works by Verdi, most notably Falstaff.

== Operatic roles created by Storchio ==
- 1897: Mimì in La bohème (Leoncavallo)
- 1900: Zazà in Zazà (Leoncavallo)
- 1903: Stephana in Siberia (Giordano)
- 1904: Cio-Cio San in Madama Butterfly (Puccini)
- 1917: Lodoletta in Lodoletta (Mascagni)
