= Eugenia Mantelli =

Italian opera singer (1860–1926)

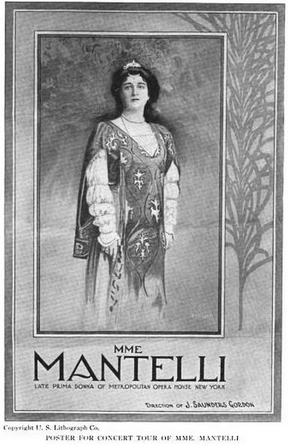
Eugenia Mantelli

Eugenia Mantelli (1860- 3 March 1926) was an Italian opera singer who had a prolific career in Europe, the United States, and South America from the 1880s through the early part of the twentieth century. She possessed a flexible warm voice with a wide vocal range that, while focusing mostly within the mezzo-soprano repertoire, enabled her to sing roles normally associated with contraltos and sopranos. Indeed, during her lifetime she was often identified as either a mezzo-soprano or a contralto by music critics without much consistency. While she had an excellent vocal technique and an exceptionally beautiful tone quality, her gifts as an actress and interpreter were only mediocre.

== Biography ==
Mantelli was born in Florence, Grand Duchy of Tuscany. Her parents were both singing teachers and her earliest musical training was received from them. She entered the Milan Conservatory, graduating from there in 1877 with diplomas in both voice and piano. She made her professional opera debut at the Teatro Nacional de São Carlos in Lisbon as Urbain in Giacomo Meyerbeer's Les Huguenots in 1883. That same year she sang the role of Kaled in Jules Massenet's Le roi de Lahore at the Teatro Sociale in Treviso. This was followed by a highly successful concert tour throughout Germany, Italy, Argentina, and Brazil with tenor Julián Gayarre.

In November 1887 she sang the role of Adalgisa in Vincenzo Bellini's Norma at the Teatro Costanzi in Rome. This was followed by several appearances at the Teatro di San Carlo in Naples, including the role of Eboli in Giuseppe Verdi's Don Carlo with Adalgisa Gabbi, José Oxilia, Giuseppe Kaschmann, and Auguste Boudouresque. In 1889 she joined the opera company that inaugurated the Teatro Argentino de La Plata in Buenos Aires. She sang with the company both in that city and at the Teatro Solis in Montevideo, notably sharing the stage with Mattia Battistini in performances of La favorita, Amleto, La forza del destino, and Gli Ugonotti (the Italian version of Les Huguenots).

In 1894 Mantelli joined the roster of the Metropolitan Opera in New York City, making her first appearance there as Amneris in Verdi's Aida on 23 November. She remained a member of the company until the end of the 1899–1900 season. One of her most successful roles at the Met was Léonor in La favorite, which she also sang for her first performance at the Royal Opera House, Covent Garden in 1896. She left the Met in 1900 just before she married her husband. Although she returned to the Met briefly in 1902 and appeared in a few vaudeville productions during the early 1900s, she spent most of her remaining career performing at the Teatro Nacional de São Carlos. After retiring from the stage, she remained in Lisbon where she taught singing for many years.
