= Giovanni Paroli =

Italian operatic tenor (1856–1920)

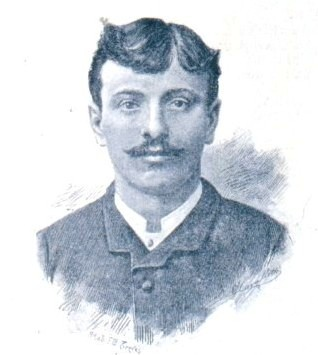
Paroli in 1887

Giovanni Paroli (1856–1920) was an Italian operatic tenor who had an active international performance career for four decades. He is best known for creating several comprimario roles in the world premieres of operas by Catalani, Donizetti, Alberto Franchetti, Mascagni, and Verdi.

== Life and career ==
Born in Brescia, Paroli made his debut at the Teatro Grande in that city in 1874. In 1882 he joined the roster at the Teatro Apollo in Rome where he notably created the role of Carlo in the world premiere of Gaetano Donizetti's Le duc d'Albe. In 1886, he made his debut at La Scala as Fritz in the world premiere of Alfredo Catalani's Edmea. At that opera house he also created the role of Cassio in the world premiere of Giuseppe Verdi's Otello in 1887, and the role of Dr Caius in the world premiere of Verdi's Falstaff in 1893. In 1892 he portrayed Lebel in the world premiere of Pietro Mascagni's I Rantzau at the Teatro della Pergola in Florence, and created the role of Matheos in the world premiere of Alberto Franchetti's Cristoforo Colombo at the Teatro Carlo Felice.

From 1905 until 1907 Paroli was committed to the Metropolitan Opera in New York City. He made his debut at the Metropolitan Opera House on 20 November 1905 as Isèpo in Amilcare Ponchielli's La Gioconda with Lillian Nordica in the title role. He sang in many productions at the Met over the next year and a half, including Baron Rouvel in Fedora, Borsa in Rigoletto, the Dancing Master in Manon Lescaut, Don Curzio in The Marriage of Figaro, Gastone in La traviata, a Jew in Salome, the Messenger in Aida, Normanno in Lucia di Lammermoor, the Notary in La sonnambula, Parpignol in La bohème, Ruiz in Il trovatore, the Sergeant in The Barber of Seville, Spoletta in Tosca, and the Usher in L'Africaine. His final appearance at the Met was on 22 February 1907 as Yamadori in Madama Butterfly with Geraldine Farrar as Cio-Cio-San and Enrico Caruso as Pinkerton.

During his long career, Paroli also worked as a guest artist at the Academy of Music in Philadelphia, the Cairo Opera House, the Chicago Grand Opera Company, the Mariinsky Theatre, the Paris Opera, the Royal Opera House in London, the Teatro Colón, the Teatro Comunale di Bologna, and the Teatro Municipal (Rio de Janeiro) among others. He died in his native city at the age of 64.
