= Germania (opera) =

- Opera by Alberto Franchetti
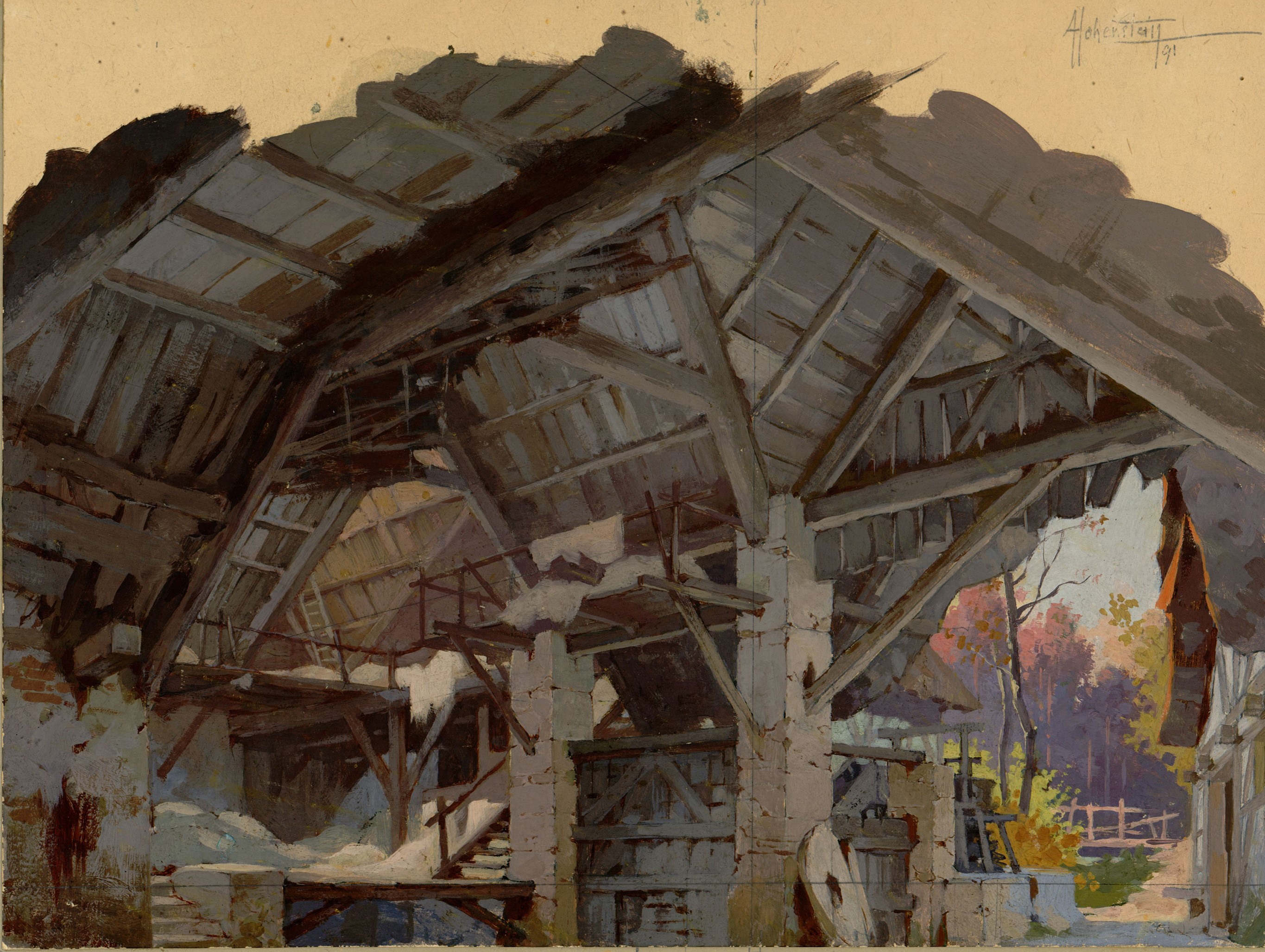
- Set design for the prologue by Adolfo Hohenstein, from the original production
- Librettist: Luigi Illica
- Language: Italian
- Premiere: 11 March 1902; La Scala, Milan

Germania is an operatic dramma lirico consisting of a prologue, two acts, an intermezzo and an epilogue by Alberto Franchetti to an Italian libretto by Luigi Illica. The opera premiered on 11 March 1902 at the Teatro alla Scala in Milan.

Illica, known for penning the librettos for some of Giacomo Puccini's best loved operas, originally gave the libretto for Tosca to Franchetti after the latter had obtained the rights to the Victorien Sardou play on which it was based. However, after Puccini expressed interest in it, Franchetti relinquished his rights, and Illica gave the composer Germania instead. The composer and librettist, who were long-time close friends, had previously collaborated on the opera Cristoforo Colombo (1892).

The plot of the libretto, which was written in grand opera style, was set during Napoleonic times and involves a love triangle among students who are working secretly underground for the liberation of a Germany then under occupation by France. In composing the music, Franchetti quoted widely from German and student's popular songs and from the work of several German composers in order to create a German color to his work.

Germania premiered under the baton of Arturo Toscanini and featured famed tenor Enrico Caruso, who sang the aria "Studenti udite" on his first recording, in the role of the student Federico. The opera would go on to become Franchetti's most successful work.

== Roles ==
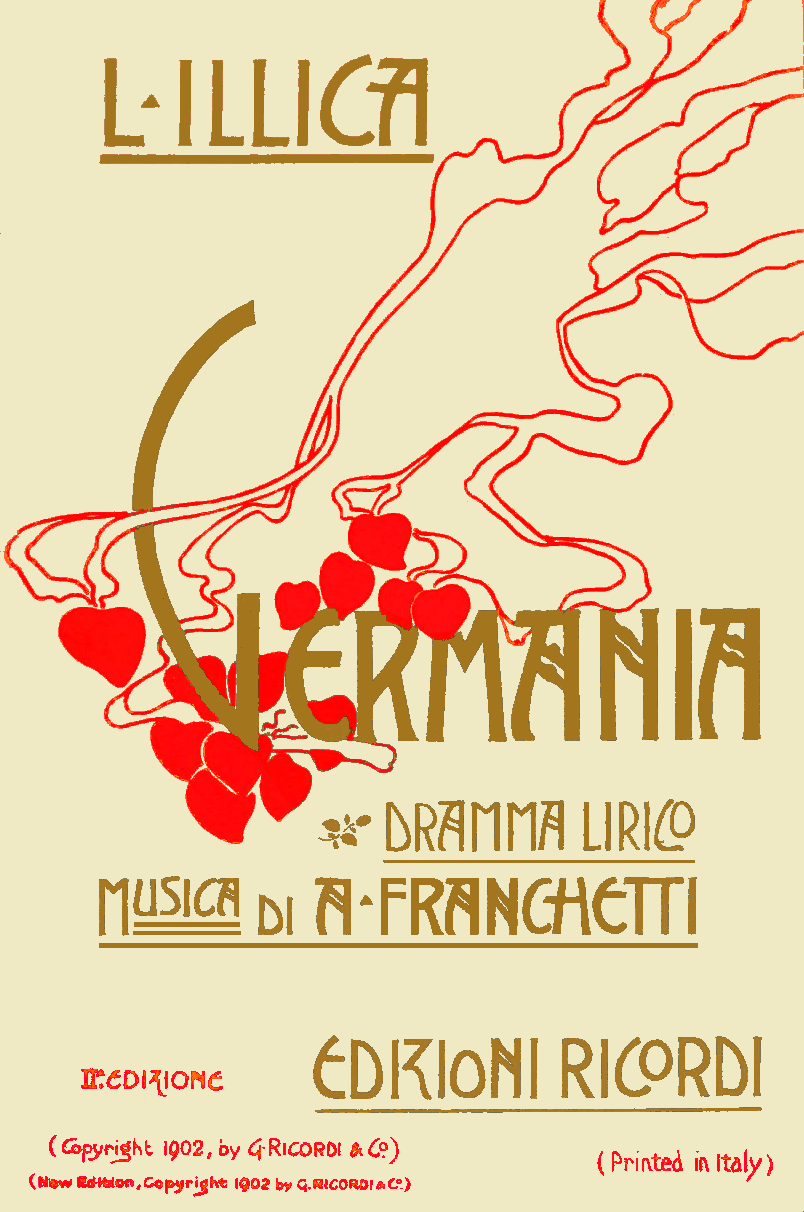
Title page of the libretto

Roles, voice types, premiere cast
| Role | Voice type | Premiere cast, 11 March 1902 (Conductor: Arturo Toscanini) |
|---|---|---|
| Carlo Teodoro Körner | tenor | Oreste Lombardi |
| Carlo Worms | baritone | Mario Sammarco |
| Crisogono | baritone | Michele Wigley |
| Federico Loewe | tenor | Enrico Caruso |
| Giovanni Filippo Palm | bass | Oreste Gennari |
| Head of German police | bass | Arcangelo Rossi |
| Jane | mezzo-soprano | Jane Bathori |
| Jebbel | soprano | Bice Silvestri |
| Hedvige | mezzo-soprano | Adele Ponzano |
| Lene Armuth | mezzo-soprano | Teresa Ferraris |
| Luigi Adolfo Guglielmo Lützow | bass | Carlo Ragni |
| Peters | bass | Ettore Gennari |
| Ricke | soprano | Amelia Pinto |
| Stapps | bass | Giovanni Gravina |
| A young boy | contralto | E. d'Alessandro |
| A woman | contralto | Bruna Properzi |

== Synopsis ==
=== Prologue ===
Time and place: in and around Nuremberg, in the year 1806.

A group of students are hiding the bookseller and publisher Giovanni Filippo Palm, who is wanted by the police for disseminating the anonymous book 'Germania'. The instigators of the hunt for Palm are Napoleon's occupying forces, who, along with a number of German princes, have been severely criticised in Palm's book. Philosophers, poets and students appeal to the inhabitants of the German territories to rise up against their exploitation and to unite their divided country. The students cannot agree on how to pursue their struggle: with the sword or the pen. Their leader Carlo Worms, an idealist, invokes the words of the philosopher Johann Gottlieb Fichte and is in favour of demanding human rights and freedom of speech and thought in the spirit of Friedrich Schiller. Pitted against him in the debate are the members of a more radical group including Federico Loewe, a friend of Carlo Worms and an adversary in more ways than one, for they are in love with the same woman, Ricke, already betrothed to Loewe. Worms seduces Ricke while Loewe is away. Ricke is desperate because Worms warns her that Loewe and he will have to settle the matter in a duel if she confesses the act to Loewe. She agrees not to reveal her disloyalty even though plagued by her conscience. Meanwhile, a young lad, Jebbel, has accepted a bribe from the police and revealed Palm's hiding place.

=== Act 1 ===
Loewe, Ricke, her sister Jane, their elderly mother and the student Crisogono, adjutant of Worms, have fled to the Black Forest. When word goes round that Worms has died in battle Ricke looks optimistically to an untroubled future with her husband Loewe. Yet on the very day of their wedding Worms suddenly appears, gravely wounded. Realising that the ceremony is over, he runs off. Shortly afterwards Loewe notices that Ricke has vanished. He discovers a farewell letter from her in which she declares her love for him but also confesses to her affair with Worms. She pleads for forgiveness, but Loewe swears to avenge himself on Worms.

=== Act 2 ===
Time and place: years later, an underground meeting of the anti-Napoleon Queen Louise League in Königsberg.

Worms is alive. Students from across Germany are assembled, united behind one slogan: GERMANIA! Jebbel, now a young man, appears before the League tribunal and confesses to having betrayed Palm to the police years ago. Many League members call for his execution, but one of their most respected underground figures, Luigi Adolfo Guglielmo Lützow, takes Jebbel's side and enlists him for the impending battle against Napoleon's forces. Suddenly Loewe appears, swearing vengeance against Worms. He challenges him to a duel. Worms is resolved to end the feud by letting Loewe kill him, but before it comes to this the Queen makes an impressive entrance. Together they declare their hopes for a future Germany free of tyranny. This collective vision finds expression in wild fanaticism. Worms, Loewe and the assembled volunteers head off to the Battle of the Nations outside Leipzig.

=== Symphonic interlude ===
The Battle of the Nations.

=== Epilogue ===
Aftermath of the battle.

Ricke has been caught up in the fray of events. She discovers Worms dead and finds Loewe gravely wounded. Without shedding tears Ricke tenderly arranges the body of her beloved and lies down beside him. As dusk gathers, her head sinks to his now-still breast as they spend their single, unending wedding night together.
