= Giulia Novelli =

Italian operatic mezzo-soprano

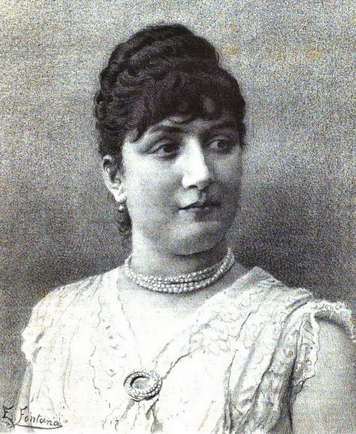
- Giulia Novelli, from an 1886 publication.
- Born: 1859; Rome
- Died: 21 June 1932 (aged 72–73); Barcelona
- Other name: Julia Novelli
- Occupation: Opera singer
- Spouse: Francesc Viñas

Giulia Novelli (1859 – 21 June 1932) was an Italian operatic mezzo-soprano.

== Early life ==
Giulia Novelli was born in Rome in 1859.

== Career ==
Giulia Novelli studied singing in Rome before making her professional opera debut in that city in 1875, as Pierotto in Gaetano Donizetti's Linda di Chamounix. In the 1880s she had a very successful career at an international level. She performed at the Opéra de Monte-Carlo (1884), at the Teatro di San Carlo, Naples (1888, 1891), at the Teatro Colón in Buenos Aires (1888), at the Teatro Municipal in Rio de Janeiro and at the Liceu in Barcelona.

In 1885, she sang the title role in Carmen at the Teatro de São Carlos in Lisbon. In 1888 she sang the role of Loretta in the world premiere of Alberto Franchetti's Asrael at Teatro Municipale in Reggio Emilia. In 1891 she sang the role of Eutibide in the premiere of Pietro Platania's Spartaco at the Teatro di San Carlo. In 1892 she took the role of Anacoana in the world premiere of Franchetti's Cristoforo Colombo at the Teatro Carlo Felice. Her other operatic roles included Leonora in Donizetti's La favorita, Maddalena in Giuseppe Verdi's Rigoletto, Azucena in Verdi's Il trovatore, Amneris in Verdi's Aida, Eboli in Verdi's Don Carlos, Ulrica in Verdi's Un ballo in maschera, Laura in Amilcare Ponchielli's La Gioconda, and Pamela in Daniel Auber's Fra Diavolo.

== Personal life ==
Giulia Novelli was married to the Spanish dramatic tenor Francisco Viñas (1863-1933). They had a daughter, Mercedes. Giulia Novelli died in 1932 in her seventies, in Moiá, Barcelona.
