= Virginia Damerini =

Italian opera singer

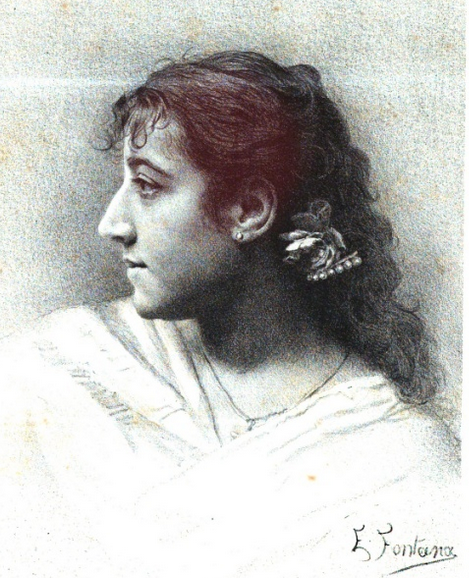
Virginia Damerini, from an 1889 publication.

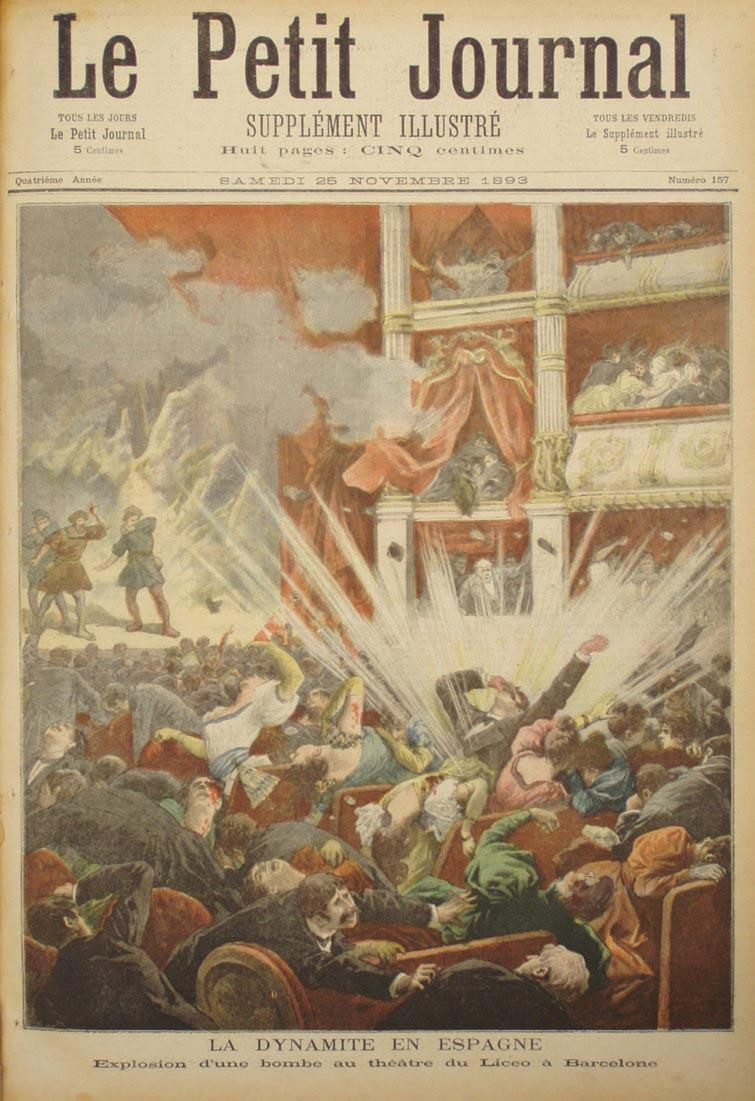
Damerini was singing on stage at the Liceu when it was bombed by an anarchist in 1893.

Virginia Damerini was an Italian operatic soprano, active towards the end of the 19th century.

== Early life ==
Virginia Damerini was born and raised in the Apennines region of Italy.

== Career ==
Damerini was a dramatic soprano. In 1884 she toured several American cities from Brooklyn to San Francisco with the Milan Grand Opera Company. During that tour, The New York Times commented that "Signora Damerini's style is both refined and expressive."

She created the role of Nefta in the premiere of Alberto Franchetti's Asrael in 1888.

Later on, she sang the title role in Gomes' Fosca (in which she was coached by the composer himself, and even had the latter compose a new aria specifically for her voice) in 1889 at Modena and again in 1890, at La Scala in Milan, with conductor Arnaldo Conti.

She also sang the "notoriously difficult" title role in Vincenzo Bellini's Norma with Arturo Toscanini conducting, at Palermo in 1893.

In 1893, she was singing Mathilde in Rossini's William Tell at El Gran Teatre del Liceu in Barcelona on the night when the theatre was bombed by anarchist Santiago Salvador. Her sister Marie Damerini was reported among the casualties in the explosion.
