= Hariclea Darclée =

Romanian opera singer (1860–1939)

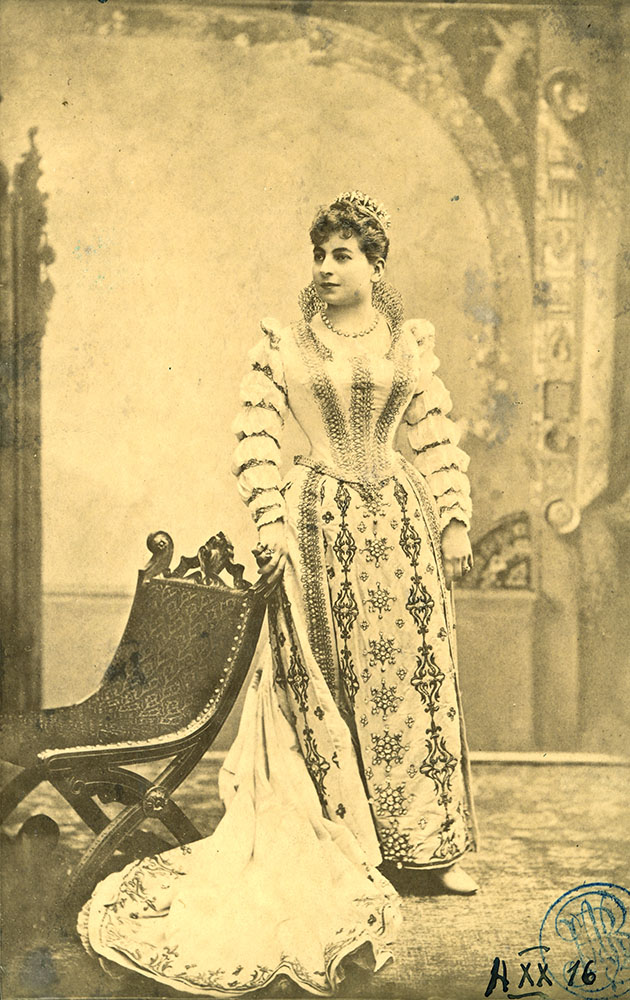
- Born: Hariclea Haricli; 10 June 1860; Brăila, United Principalities of Moldavia and Wallachia
- Died: 12 January 1939 (aged 78); Bucharest, Kingdom of Romania
- Resting place: Bellu Cemetery, Bucharest
- Education: George Enescu National University of Arts
- Occupation: Operatic spinto soprano
- Years active: 1888–1918
- Spouse: Iorgu Hartulari
- Children: Ion Hartulari-Darclée
- Parents: Ion Haricli (father); Maria Haricli, née Aslan (mother)
- Website: www.darclee.com

Hariclea Darclée (née Haricli; later Hartulari; 10 June 1860 – 12 January 1939) was a celebrated Romanian operatic spinto soprano of Greek descent who had a three-decade-long career.

Darclée's repertoire ranged from coloratura soprano roles to heavier Verdi roles, including many in the Franco-Italian lyric repertory. Throughout her career she participated in several world premieres, creating the title roles in Giacomo Puccini's Tosca, Pietro Mascagni's Iris, and Alfredo Catalani's La Wally.

Puccini reportedly considered her to have been "the most beautiful and exquisite Manon". Enciclopedia dello Spettacolo, regarded as the most comprehensive international performing arts encyclopedia, named Darclée "world's greatest singer for 25 years".

== Early years ==
Darclée was born Hariclea Haricli in Brăila to a family with Greek roots. Her father, Ion Haricli, was a landlord in Teleorman County. Her mother, Maria Aslan, was a relative of the noble Mavrocordatos family. The family lived for a while in the town of Turnu Măgurele in southern Romania. She began her studies at Conservatoire of music in Iași, making her professional appearances as a concert performer in 1884.

== Career ==
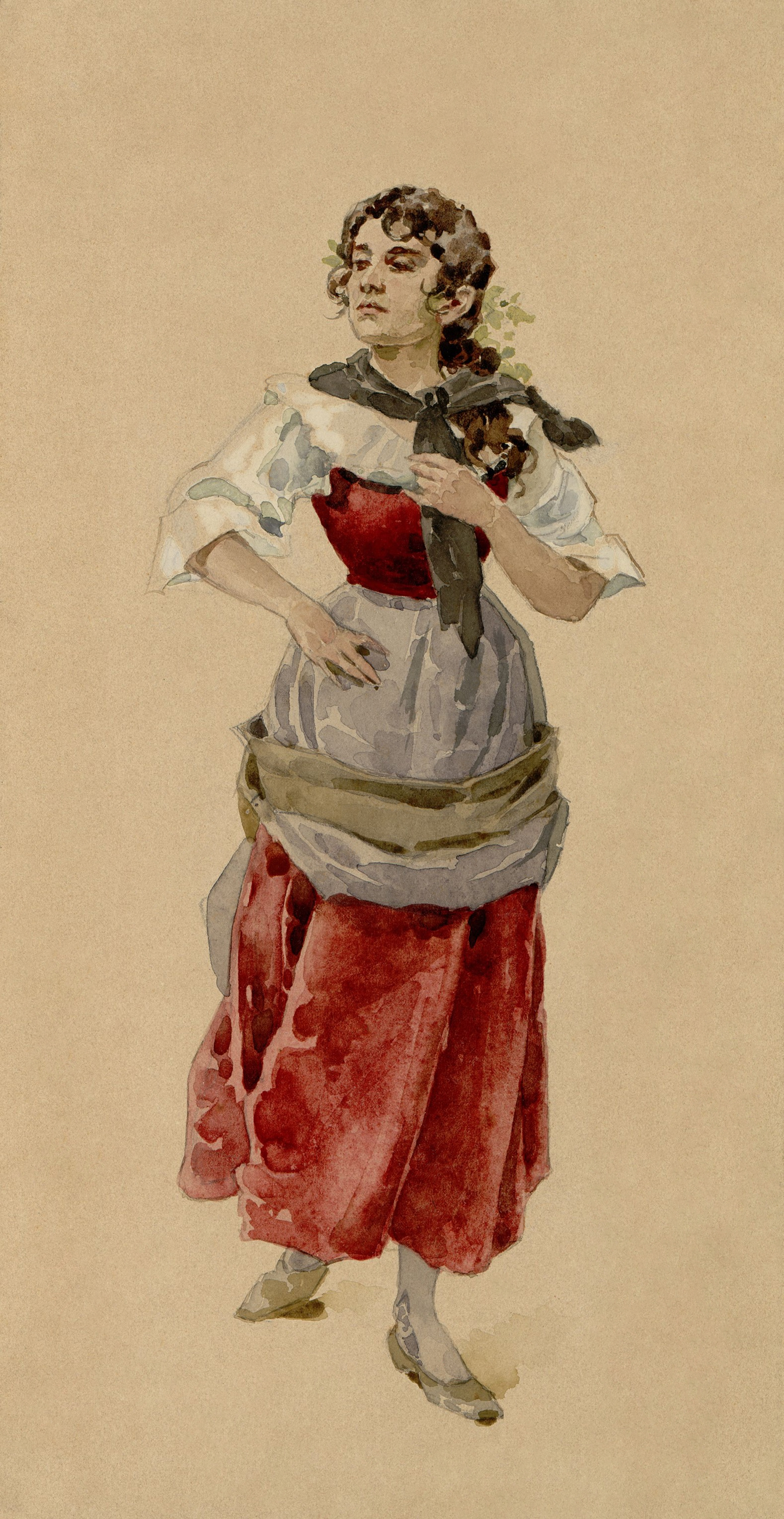
Costume design for her role in the première production of La Wally

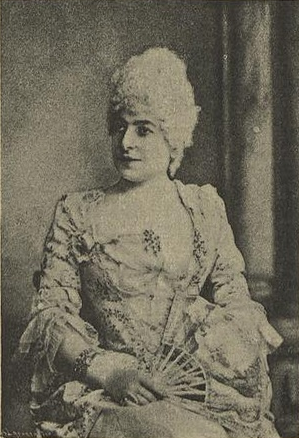
Hariclea Darclée as Manon in 1896, Saint Charles Royal Theatre, Lisbon

She continued her studies in Paris under Jean-Baptiste Faure. She married a young officer, Iorgu Hartulari, and became known for a while as Hariclea Hartulari-Darclée, Darclée being the nom de théâtre she adopted when she made her debut at the Paris Opéra in 1888 as Marguerite in Charles Gounod's Faust. In 1889, she replaced Adelina Patti as Juliette in Gounod's Roméo et Juliette, to increasing acclaim.

In 1890, Darclée scored a great success in her La Scala debut as Chimène in Jules Massenet’s Le Cid, and was immediately engaged by all the leading Italian theatres. Highlights of her later career in Italy from 1890 on included the world-premières of the part of Odalea in Antônio Carlos Gomes' Condor at La Scala in Milan in 1891, the title-role in Alfredo Catalani's La Wally at the same theater in 1892, Luisa in Pietro Mascagni's I Rantzau at the Teatro della Pergola in Florence in 1892, and the title roles in Pietro Mascagni's Iris and Giacomo Puccini's Tosca, both at Teatro Costanzi in Rome in 1899 and 1900, respectively.

Between 1893 and 1910 she appeared frequently in Moscow, Saint Petersburg, Lisbon, Barcelona, Madrid, and Buenos Aires. She was very popular in Spain and South America, where she participated in many local premières of new operas by Puccini, Mascagni, and Massenet.

Among the many roles she portrayed are Gilda in Rigoletto, Ophélie in Hamlet, Valentine in Les Huguenots, Violetta in La traviata (for which she was particularly praised by the composer himself), Desdemona in Otello, Mimì in La bohème, Santuzza in Cavalleria Rusticana, and the title roles in Manon, Manon Lescaut, Aida, and Carmen. The last performance of her career was as Juliette in Roméo et Juliette at the Teatro Lirico in Milan in 1918.

== Personal life ==
Darclée's son was composer Ion Hartulari-Darclée, who was known particularly as a writer of operettas.

== Recordings ==
In 1905, Darclée visited the Milan studio of the Italian record label Fonotipia to record excerpts from some of her signature roles. The resulting recording session produced discs of arias from Tosca, Don Pasquale, Iris, Cavalleria Rusticana and La Traviata. None of these recordings were ever released and only the Tosca, Don Pasquale and Cavalleria recordings are properly documented. It is assumed that all copies of these recordings were destroyed in the Allied bombings of Berlin (along with an entire Fonotipia warehouse) in World War II, although some claim that at least one or two of them have survived (one was reportedly listed in an auction at Christie's Auction House in 1992, but quietly withdraw before the auction date). Later on in 1911, Darclée made two private recordings of two short Romanian folk songs; at present, these remain the only surviving records of Darclée's voice.

== Legacy ==
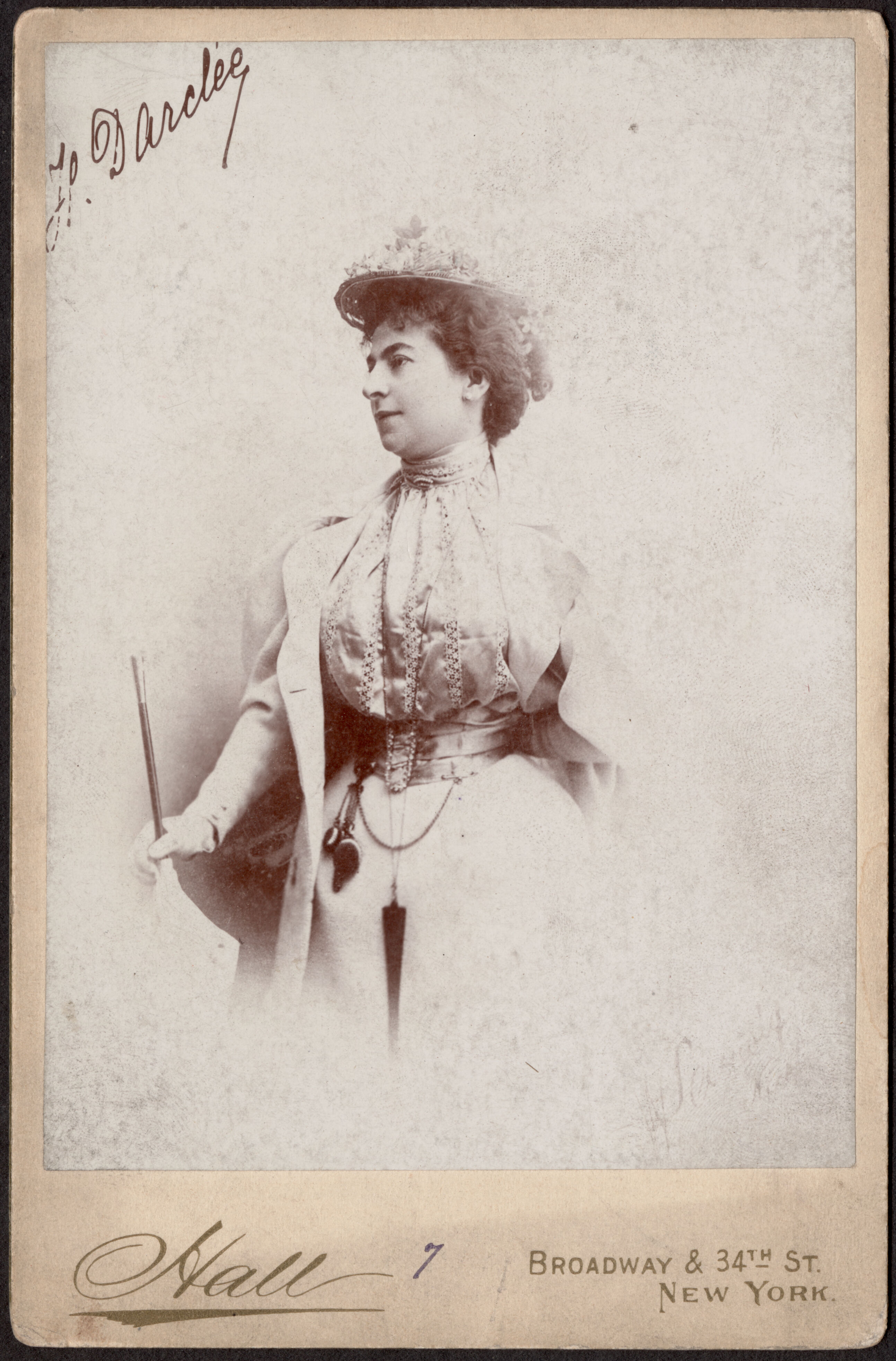
H. Darcleé, ca. 1890–1915; from the Philip Hale Photograph Collection of the Boston Public Library

The 1961 Romanian film Darclee, directed by Mihai Iacob and starring Silvia Popovici, is based on her life story.

Started in 1995, the Hariclea Darclée Festival and International Voice Competition is held every two years in Brăila.

== Repertory ==
Over her prolific career, Darclée sang a combined 58 roles in 56 operas by 31 different composers:

- Daniel Auber La Muette de Portici (Luisa).
- Georges Bizet Carmen (Carmen).
- Arrigo Boito Mefistofele (Margherita).
- Alfredo Catalani La Wally (Wally) – opera composed for her voice and interpreted in prima assoluta at Teatro alla Scala of Milan on 20 January 1892.
- Alexis Catargi Enoch Arden (Ammie Lee) – opera composed for her voice and interpreted in prima assoluta at the National Theatre Bucharest in 1904.
- Isidore De Lara Amy Robsart (Amy Robsart) – opera composed for her voice and interpreted in prima assoluta at Montecarlo Opera in April 1897.
- Gaetano Donizetti Don Pasquale (Norina).
- Gaetano Donizetti L’elisir d’amore (Adina).
- Gaetano Donizetti Linda di Chamounix (Linda).
- Gaetano Donizetti Lucrezia Borgia (Lucrezia).
- Gaetano Donizetti Maria di Rohan (Maria).
- Alberto Franchetti Cristoforo Colombo (Isabella di Aragona, Ikuamota) – opera composed for her voice and interpreted in prima assoluta at Genoa, on 6 October 1892.
- Mikhail Glinka Ivan Susanin (Vania) – opera interpreted in première for France, at Nice in 1890.
- Antônio Carlos Gomes Condor (Odalea) – opera composed for her voice and interpreted in prima assoluta at Teatro alla Scala of Milan on 21 February 1891;
- Antônio Carlos Gomes Il Guarany (Cecilia).
- Antônio Carlos Gomes The title-role in Fosca
- Antônio Carlos Gomes The title-role in Maria Tudor
- Charles Gounod Faust (Marguérite).
- Charles Gounod Roméo et Juliette (Juliette).
- Fromental Halévy La Juive (Rachèle).
- Ruggero Leoncavallo Pagliacci (Nedda) – opera interpreted in première for Romania at Bucharest National Theatre in 1903.
- Ruggero Leoncavallo Zaza (Zaza).
- Luigi Mancinelli Ero e Leandro (Ero) – opera composed for her voice and interpreted in prima assoluta at Madrid, in 1897.
- Pietro Mascagni Cavalleria rusticana (Santuzza) – opera interpreted in première for Romania at Bucharest National Theatre in 1891.
- Pietro Mascagni L’amico Fritz (Suzel) – opera interpreted in première for Teatro Della Pergole of Florence in 1891 and for Bucharest National Theatre in 1910.
- Pietro Mascagni Iris (Iris) – opera composed for her voice and interpreted in prima assoluta at Teatro dell’Opera of Rome, on 22 January 1898, in première for Teatro alla Scala di Milano on 19 January 1899 and in première for Bucharest National Theatre in 1908.
- Pietro Mascagni I Rantzau (Luisa) – opera composed for her voice and interpreted in prima assoluta at Teatro delle Pergole of Florence on 10 November 1892 and in première for Teatro dell’Opera of Rome on 26 November 1892.
- Jules Massenet Le Cid (Chimène) – the debut in Italy and the première for Teatro alla Scala of Milan on 26 December 1890.
- Jules Massenet Manon (Manon).
- Jules Massenet Thaïs (Thaïs).
- Giacomo Meyerbeer L’Africaine (Selika).
- Giacomo Meyerbeer Les Huguénots (Regina, Valentine) – the première for Romania at Bucharest National Theatre in 1897.
- Wolfgang Amadeus Mozart Don Giovanni (Zerlina).
- Giovanni Pacini Saffo (Saffo) – première for Teatro dell’Opera of Rome on 28 October 1911.
- Ubaldo Pacchierotti Eidelberga mia (Catina) – opera composed for her voice and interpreted in prima assoluta at Teatro Colón of Buenos Aires in 1909;
- Ettore Panizza Aurora (Aurora) – opera composed for her voice and interpreted in prima assoluta at Teatro Colón of Buenos Aires in 1909.
- Giacomo Puccini Manon Lescaut (Manon Lescaut) – opera composed for her voice and interpreted in première for Teatro alla Scala of Milan on 27 March 1897.
- Giacomo Puccini La Bohème (Mimì) – opera interpreted in première for America at Teatro Colón of Buenos Aires in 1896 and in première for Romania at Bucharest National Theatre on 15 January 1903.
- Giacomo Puccini Tosca (Floria Tosca) – opera composed for her voice; the soprano's aria was requested to Puccini by Hariclea Darclée suggesting the principal musicals elements, too; the opera was interpreted in prima assoluta at Teatro dell’Opera of Rome on 14 January 1900 and in première at Teatro Regio of Turin on 20 February 1900, Teatro alla Scala of Milan on 17 March 1900, Lisbon on 19 January 1901, Bucharest National Theatre on 18 January 1902 and Monte-Carlo Opera on 28 March 1903.
- Luigi & Federico Ricci Crispino e la Comare (La Comare).
- Gioachino Rossini Guglielmo Tell (Matilde d’Absburgo).
- Gioachino Rossini Stabat Mater (Soprano).
- Anton Rubinstein Damon (Tamara).
- Camille Saint-Saëns Proserpine (Proserpine).
- Richard Strauss Der Rosenkavalier (Marschalin) – première for Italy at Teatro dell’Opera of Rome on 14 November 1911.
- Ambroise Thomas Hamlet (Ofélie).
- Ambroise Thomas Mignon (Mignon).
- Pietro Vallini Il Voto (Maria) – opera composed for her voice and interpreted in prima assoluta at Teatro dell’Opera of Rome on 27 November 1894.
- Giuseppe Verdi Aida (Aida).
- Giuseppe Verdi Un ballo in maschera (Amelia).
- Giuseppe Verdi Otello (Desdemona).
- Giuseppe Verdi Rigoletto (Gilda).
- Giuseppe Verdi Simon Boccanegra (Amelia-Maria) – première for Teatro dell’Opera of Rome on 17 May 1892.
- Giuseppe Verdi La Traviata (Violetta Valery).
- Giuseppe Verdi Il Trovatore (Leonora).
- Richard Wagner Die Meistersinger (Eva).
- Richard Wagner Lohengrin (Elsa).
- Richard Wagner Tannhäuser (Elisabeth) – première for Italy at Teatro alla Scala of Milan on 29 December 1891 and for Teatro Colón of Buenos Aires in 1897.
