= Teatro Argentino de La Plata =

Historic opera house in Argentina

Coordinates: 34°55′5.25″S 57°57′3.88″W

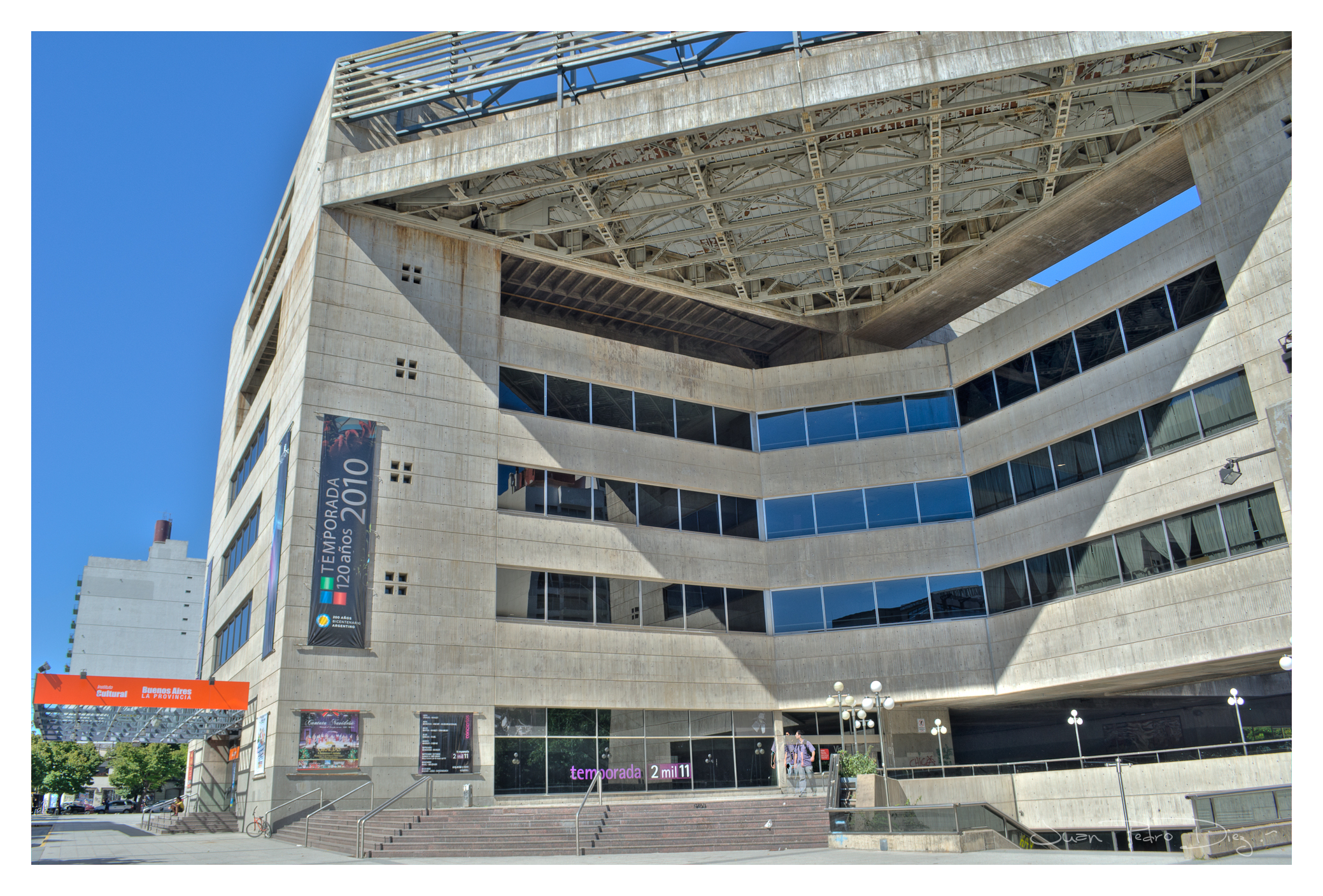
Teatro Argentino de La Plata

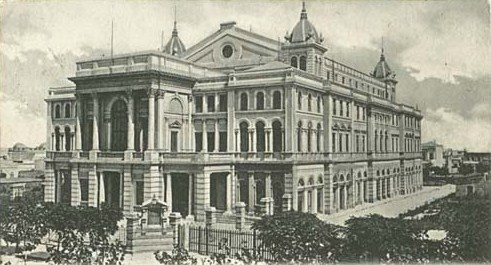
The former Teatro Argentino (1904)

The Teatro Argentino de La Plata is the second most important lyric opera house in Argentina, after the Teatro Colón in Buenos Aires. The theatre is located in a central block of the city of La Plata, the capital of Buenos Aires Province. The venue occupies the block bounded by the 9 and 10 streets and 51 & 53 avenues; it belongs to the Monumental Axis of public buildings in La Plata.

== The original building ==
The original building was a classic Italian opera house, conceived in Renaissance style by the Italian architect Leopoldo Rocchi. Construction began in 1887, five years after the foundation of the city of La Plata itself. The main hall had a capacity of ca. 1,500 seats. In the foyer there was a beautiful white Carrara marble staircase and in the concert hall hung a huge chandelier. The easy chairs were tapestried in blue velveteen and the Bordeaux curtain was embroidered in gold. Surrounding the theatre was the "Peace Garden," containing flags and national flowers of several countries.

It was inaugurated on November 19, 1890, with Giuseppe Verdi's Otello; in leading roles were the Italian soprano Elvira Colonnese (Desdemona) and the Uruguayan tenor José Oxilia (Othello). The theatre grew to accommodate a renowned stable orchestra and chorus. A stable ballet company was added in 1946. Among the great artists that performed at the Teatro Argentino we find singers such as Maria Barrientos, Luisa Tetrazzini, Marian Anderson, Emma Carelli, Fedora Barbieri, Tito Schipa, Beniamino Gigli, Titta Ruffo, and Mario del Monaco, classical ballet dancers such as Anna Pavlova, Dore Hoyer and Iris Scaccheri, as well as musicians such as Pietro Mascagni, Richard Strauss (with the Vienna Philharmonic Orchestra), Arthur Rubinstein, Andrés Segovia, Alexander Brailowsky, Claudio Arrau, Pablo Casals, and Yehudi Menuhin.

== The new building ==
Unfortunately, a major fire destroyed the original building in 1977, leaving only the badly damaged exterior walls standing. Against national and international outcry, the de facto government of the military dictatorship at the time (the so-called Proceso de Reorganizacion Nacional) decided against rebuilding the original classic structure. Instead, it chose to replace it with a massive Theatre & Cultural Centre designed in a brutalist style, located on the same city block. During the intervening years (1977–1999), the Teatro Argentino companies continued to produce performances in various La Plata venues, notably the former movie theatre, the Cine Gran Rocha. After much planning and rescheduling due to economic difficulties, the new building was finished and inaugurated on October 12, 1999 with a performance that included excerpts from works of Giuseppe Verdi, Charles Gounod, Umberto Giordano and Gaetano Donizetti, as well as the ballet Tango en gris ("Tango in grey"), with music by Atilio Stampone and régie by Oscar Araiz.

The new complex includes today a 2,000-seat operatic venue with a typical European horseshoe structure, named Alberto Ginastera Hall after the famous Argentine composer. An enormous three-tonne bronze chandelier with 400 light-bulbs hangs over the main floor, in an exact replica of the one featured in the original building.

The complex also includes the smaller 300-seat Ástor Piazzolla Hall, as well as rehearsal areas, and space for the associated technical shops. The lower level includes the Emilio Pettoruti Exhibition Hall for local or international transient art collections like Pablo Picasso, Benito Quinquela Martin or Florencio Molina Campos exhibitions.

Despite the excellent technical facilities and the superb acoustics of the main hall, the complex itself, built in brutalist style, continues to be regarded as a sort of eyesore by the local population.

== See also ==
- List of buildings
- List of concert halls
- List of opera houses
