= Fosca (opera) =

1873 opera by Antônio Carlos Gomes

- Opera seria by Antônio Carlos Gomes
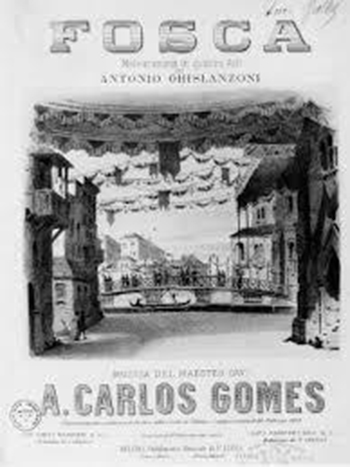
- Reproduction of the cover of the opera Fosca
- Librettist: Antonio Ghislanzoni
- Language: Italian
- Based on: Luigi Capranica's La festa delle Marie
- Premiere: 16 February 1873; La Scala, Milan

Fosca is an opera seria in four acts by Brazilian composer Antônio Carlos Gomes to an Italian-language libretto by Antonio Ghislanzoni based on Luigi Capranica's 1869 novel La festa delle Marie.

== Performance history ==
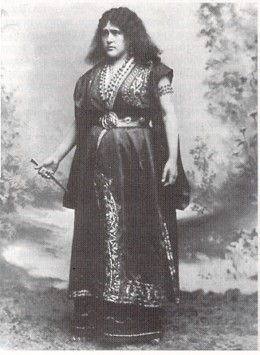
Gabrielle Krauss, the first soprano to perform the role of Fosca

The opera premiered at La Scala in Milan on 16 February 1873 with an all-star cast led by French soprano Gabrielle Krauss. Despite being a success with the critics, including French composer Charles Gounod who was present at the premiere, the opera was generally a failure with the masses because of a dispute between lovers of bel canto and supporters of Wagnerian music-drama. Gomes revised it in 1877, and the premiere of the new version (this time described as a melodramma) on February 7, 1878, also at La Scala, was a complete success.

Since then, performances of the opera have been rare. Although a handful of famous singers, such as Hariclea Darclée and Virginia Damerini, have tried to revive interest in the work in the decades following its premiere, the opera failed to gain a foothold on the general repertoire. Some of the most recent productions, in all cases of the revised version, include a 1997 staging by the National Opera of Bulgaria, another at the Teatro Amazonas in Manaus, in May 1998, and another by the Wexford Festival Opera in October of the same year. In 2016, the Theatro Municipal de São Paulo mounted a new production of the opera, staged in December.

== Roles ==
Roles voice types, premiere cast
Role	Voice type	Premiere cast, 16 February 1873 Conductor: Franco Faccio	Cast of revised version, February 7, 1878 Conductor: Franco Faccio
Gajolo, leader of a band of pirates	bass	Ormondo Maini	Ormondo Maini
Fosca, his sister	soprano	Gabrielle Krauss	Amalia Fossa
Cambro, a Venetian deserter, Gajolo's servant	baritone	Victor Maurel	Gustavo Moriami
Paolo, a Venetian prisoner of Gajolo	tenor	Carlo Bulterini	Francesco Tamagno
Delia, betrothed to Paolo	soprano	Cristina Lamare	Adele Garbini
Michele Giotta, a Venetian senator, Paolo's father	bass	Angelo De Giuli	Carlo Moretti
The Doge of Venice	bass	Giovanni Tanzio	Ettore Marcassa
Pirates, citizens of Venice

== Synopsis ==
Place: Istria and Venice
Time: The 10th century

=== Act 1 ===
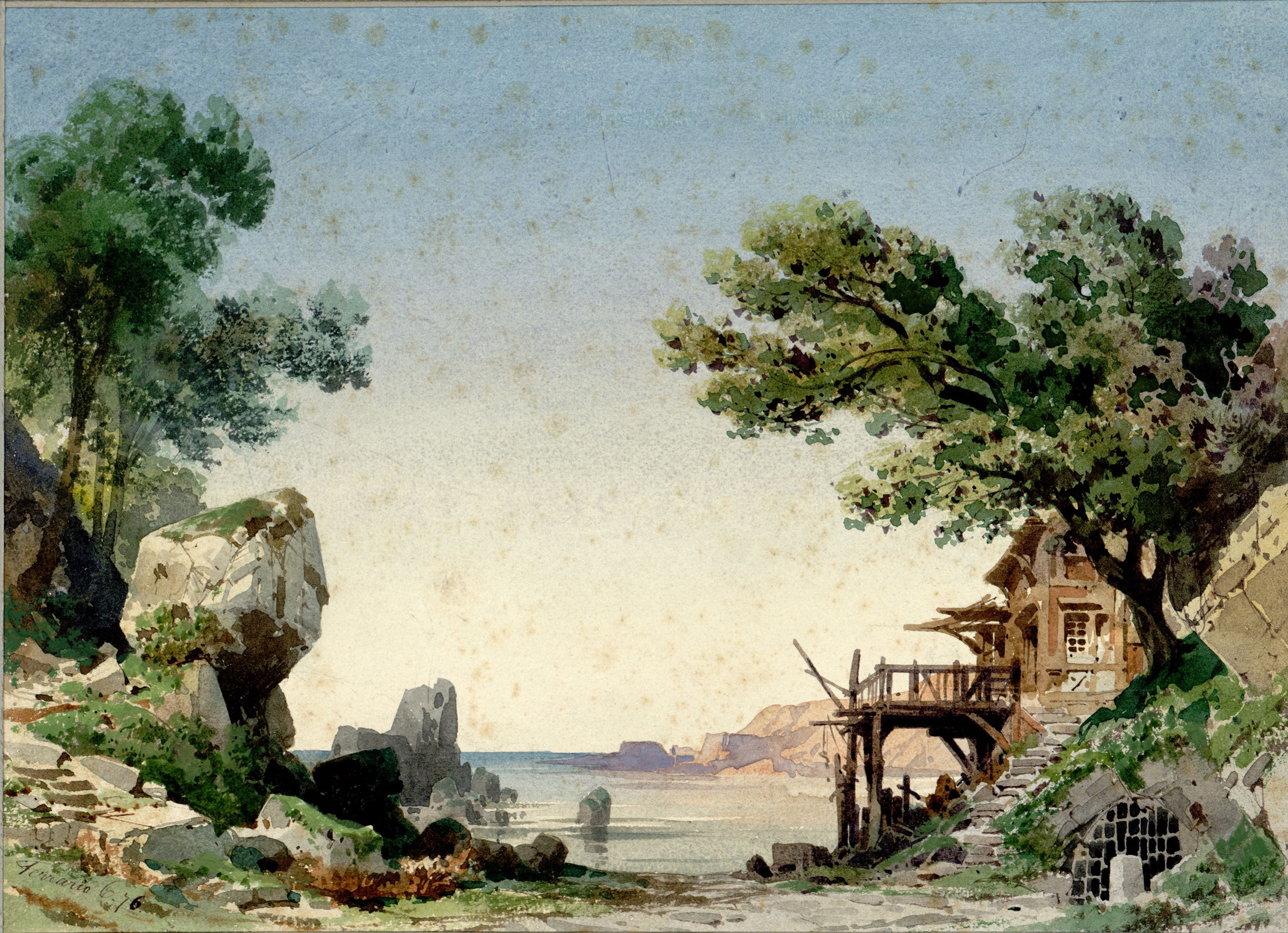
Il Pirano, set design for Fosca, act 1 (1876)

The pirates' lair near Piran

The pirates ask Gajolo about their next raid. He is planning a kidnapping of brides who are participating in the "Feast of the Marys" at San Pietro in Venice. Cambro arrives to report that Michele Giotta, father of the pirates' prisoner, Paolo, is offering a reward for his son's return. Fosca, who loves Paolo, suggests double-crossing Giotta and claiming the money without releasing Paolo. The pirates reject this dishonourable plan. Gajolo asks Cambro to watch Fosca, and the pirates depart. Paolo, thinking he is to be executed, is brought out of his cell by Fosca. She confesses her love for him, but he rejects her: he is in love with Delia, to whom he is betrothed. Gajolo reappears with Giotta, who has paid Paolo's ransom, and, to Fosca's horror, father and son leave for Venice. Cambro asks Fosca what his reward might be if he can deliver Delia to her. She replies "I will marry you."

=== Act 2 ===
Scene 1: Delia's house in Venice

Paolo and Delia are to be married in an hour. Delia is worried that Paolo may have been attracted to Fosca, who nursed him when he was ill during his captivity. Paolo reassures her. Cambro, disguised as a Turkish merchant, offers to sell valuable jewellery to Delia. She declines. Paolo and Delia exchange fond farewells and depart in opposite directions in order to prepare for the wedding. Cambro looks forward to abducting Delia.

Scene 2: A piazza in front of the church of San Pietro

Cambro, still in disguise, tells Fosca (who is also in disguise) of Paolo's love for Delia and promises that he will avenge her. She invokes demons and rails against God. Gajolo is surprised to find Fosca at the church, but she reassures him that she is not intending to disrupt his raid. The wedding procession arrives and Fosca suddenly attacks Paolo. The pirates restrain her but she reiterates her desire for vengeance. The procession proceeds and some of the pirates carry Delia off, to Fosca's delight. Paolo is also captured, but a group of Venetian nobles overpower Gajolo.

=== Act 3 ===
A cell in the pirates' lair

Delia bemoans her fate and her separation from Paolo. Fosca enters and Delia recognises her as her attacker at the church. Fosca tells her that Paolo is now in her power. Delia begs her to save Paolo and offers to die in place of him or to become Fosca's slave. Fosca, moved, relents and declares that it is she who will suffer. The pirates are aghast at the capture of Gajolo. Cambro fuels Fosca's jealousy once more, and she decides that she will rescue Gajolo and honour her promise to Cambro.

=== Act 4 ===
Scene 1: The Doge's Palace in Venice

The Doge agrees to set Gajolo free. However, if it turns out that Fosca has killed Paolo, Gajolo must return to Venice and be executed. If he does not do so, he will be pursued to the ends of the earth.

Scene 2: The pirates' lair

Paolo, a prisoner again, believes that Delia is dead and longs for his own death. Fosca tells him that he must die unless Delia, whom she produces, takes poison. Delia is in two minds, but Paolo angrily rejects Fosca's proposal. She orders the pirates to kill Paolo, but at that moment Gajolo appears and demands that Paolo be freed. He reveals that when Cambro tried to murder him in Venice, he killed Cambro, and recounts his encounter with the Doge – Paolo and Delia must return to Venice or he will die. Fosca, distraught, pleads for the lovers' forgiveness. They depart, saying that they will pray for her. Fosca takes the poison intended for Delia and, as she dies, the pirates vent their anger at Venice.
