= Cristoforo Colombo (opera) =

1892 opera in four acts by Alberto Franchetti

- Opera by Alberto Franchetti
- Poster for the world premiere
- Librettist: Luigi Illica
- Language: Italian
- Based on: Christopher Columbus
- Premiere: 6 October 1892; Teatro Carlo Felice, Genoa

Cristoforo Colombo (Christopher Columbus, Italian pronunciation: [kriˈstɔːforo koˈlombo]) is an opera in four acts and an epilogue by Alberto Franchetti to an Italian libretto by Luigi Illica. It was written in 1892 to commemorate the 400th anniversary of Christopher Columbus' arrival in America.

Commissioned by the city of Genoa, Columbus' birthplace, the opera deals with the voyage of discovery, its opposition by the Spanish authorities, Columbus' encouragement by Queen Isabella, and finally, after his difficulties and triumph, his anguish when he learns of her death.

An essentially melodic opera only tangentially influenced by the emerging verismo style, it is harmonically rich, with obvious references to the work of Richard Wagner and Meyerbeer. The act 2 monologue contains a Rhine-like motif; after cries of Terra! Terra! the orchestra replies with Tristan-like ecstasy, and then a rainbow bridge-like triumph. Its anti-church elements have been noted, particularly in the opera's earlier versions: it is the clerics who oppose the voyage initially, and who violently attempt to evangelise the South American natives.

== Performance history ==
The opera premiered at Genoa's Teatro Carlo Felice on 6 October 1892 conducted by Luigi Mancinelli with sets designed by Ugo Gheduzzi and costumes by Adolfo Hohenstein. The same year, it was performed in a revised version at La Scala, Milan. It had a number of performances throughout Italy, many of them conducted by Arturo Toscanini, and in Buenos Aires. The opera's North American premiere was presented by the Philadelphia-Chicago Grand Opera Company at the Philadelphia Metropolitan Opera House on November 20, 1913, with Titta Ruffo in the title role, Rosa Raisa as Queen Isabella of Spain, Amedeo Bassi as Don Fernan Guevara, and Gustave Huberdeau as Don Roldano Ximenes.

Despite initial stage success, a massive cut of the first version, of some 100 pages of orchestral score, led to the published version; a set of adventures in America in acts 3 and 4 having been considered too long. The final version of 1923 contained three acts, omitting the American content altogether, although containing much of its music. One of Luigi Illica's first librettos, it had a difficult gestation due to difficulties with the composer. Illica withdrew his name from the project after the first performance.

== Roles ==
Hohenstein's costume design for Cristoforo Colombo

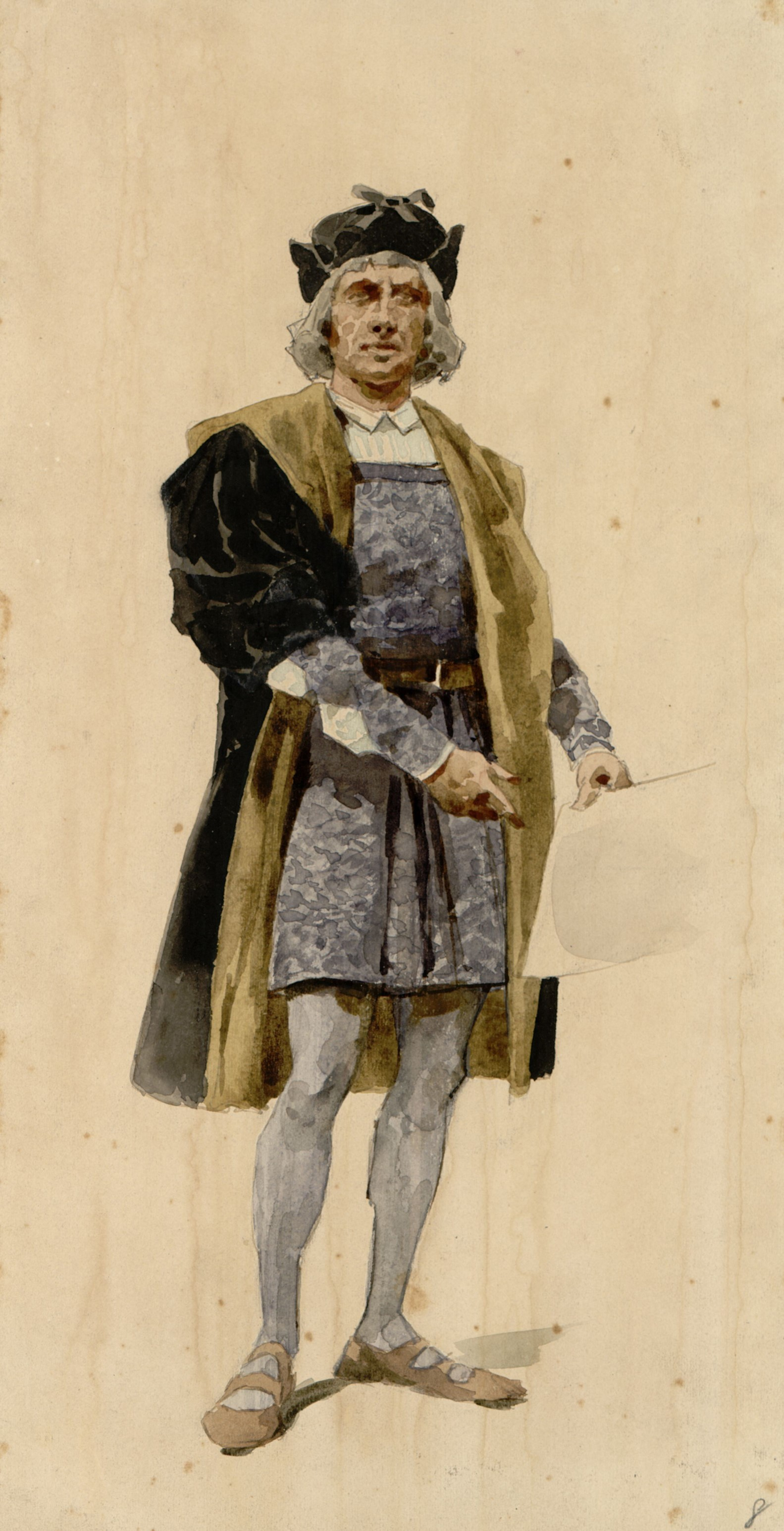
Act 1 (1918)

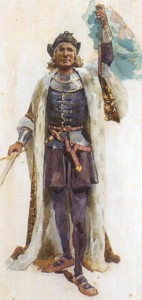
Act 2 (premiere)

Roles, voice types, premiere cast
Role	Voice type	Premiere cast, 6 October 1892 Conductor: Luigi Mancinelli
Cristoforo Colombo, Christopher Columbus	baritone	Giuseppe Kaschmann
Isabella de Aragona, Queen Isabella I of Spain	soprano	Elvira Colonnese
Don Fernando Guevara, Captain of the Royal Guards	tenor	Edoardo Garbin
Don Roldano Ximenes, a Spanish knight	bass	Francesco Navarrini
Matheos, foreman of the ship's crew	tenor	Giovanni Paroli
Anacoana, an Indian queen	mezzo-soprano	Giulia Novelli
Iguamota, her daughter	soprano	Elvira Colonnese
Bobita, the old chieftain	bass	Vittorio Cesarotto
Bobadilla, false messenger of the King of Spain	bass	Raffaele Terzi

== Selected recordings ==
- Individual arias
  - Titta Ruffo Edition: Two arias from act 2 of the opera: "Aman lassù le stelle" (Strange loves have the stars on high) and "Dunque ho sognato?" (Is it a dream?) (Preiser Records 89303)
- Complete opera
  - Cristoforo Colombo Renato Bruson (baritone); Roberto Scandiuzzi (bass); Rosella Ragatzu (soprano); Gisella Pasino (mezzo-soprano); Marco Berti (tenor); Hungarian Radio Chorus, Budapest, Frankfurt Radio Symphony. Conductor: Marcello Viotti. (Koch Schwann 367392)
