= Francesc Viñas =

Spanish operatic tenor (1863–1933)

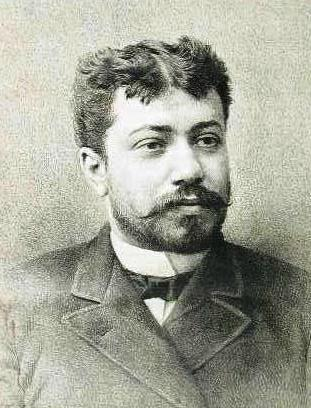
Francesc Viñas circa 1891

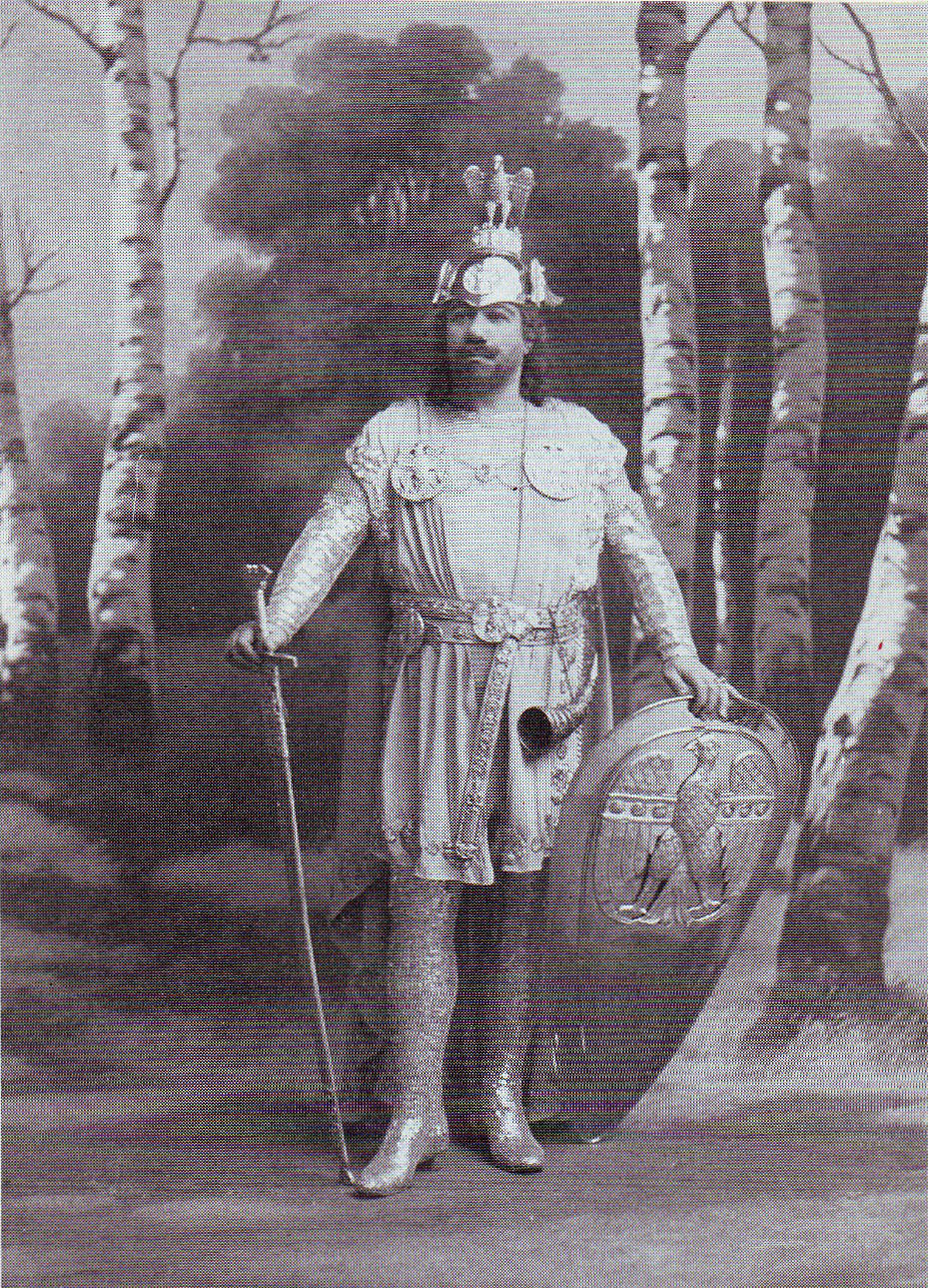
In the role of Lohengrin circa 1892

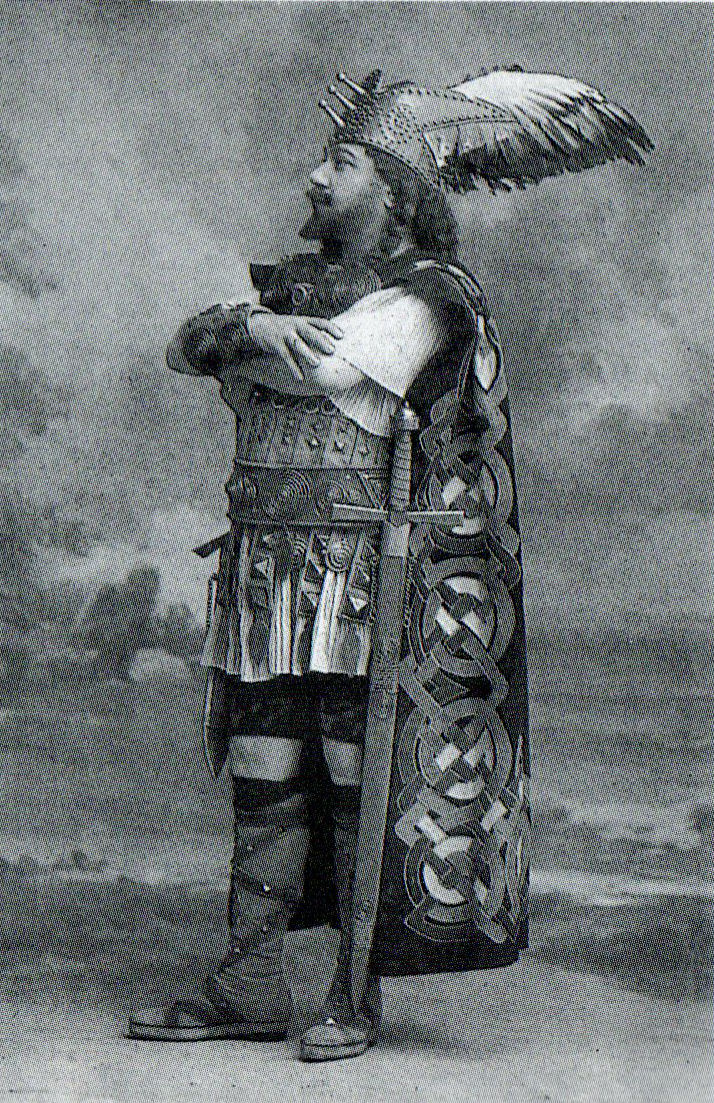
In the role of Tristan circa 1908

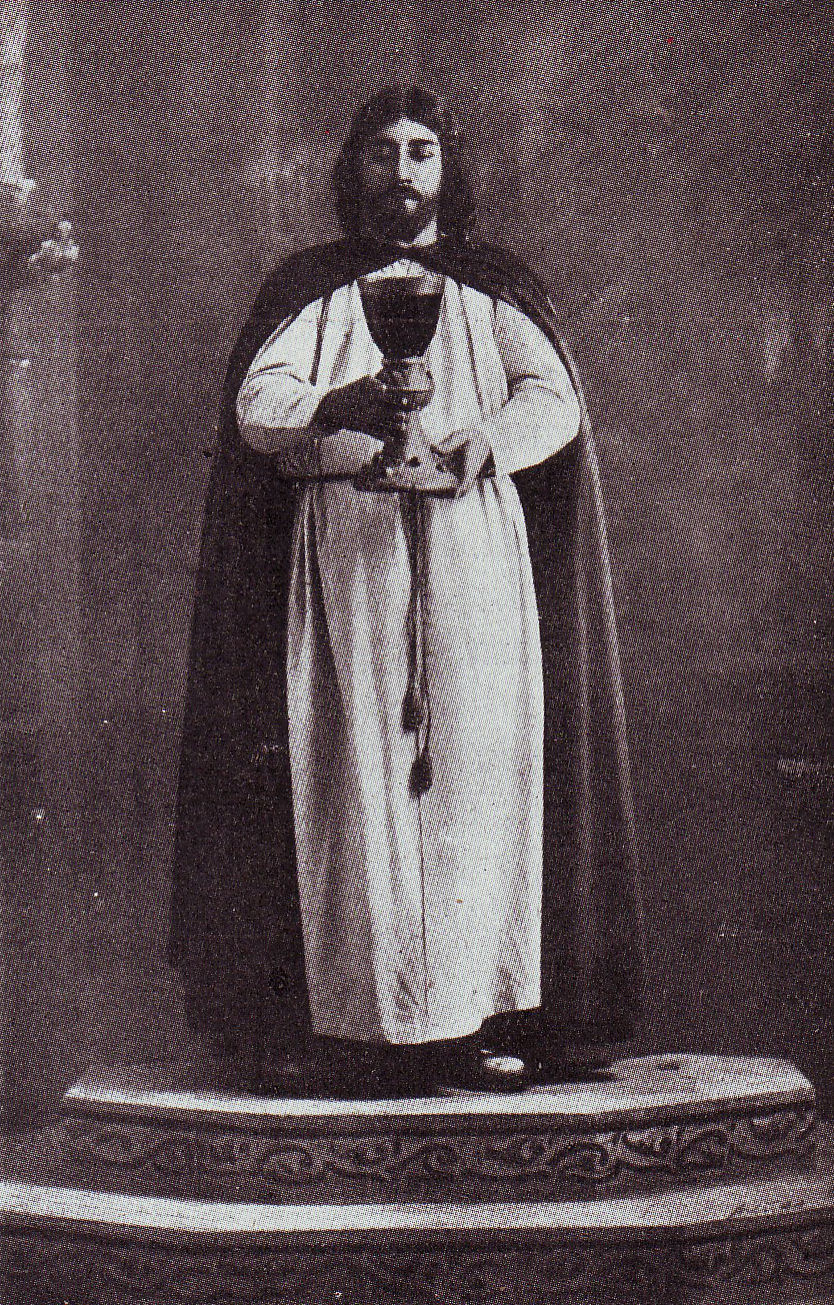
In the role of Parsifal

Francesc Viñas i Dordal (27 March 1863 – 14 July 1933) was a Spanish operatic tenor. He is also known by the Spanish version of his name, Francisco Viñas and the Italian version, Francesco Vignas. He was particularly known for his performances in the operas of Richard Wagner and sang in the first post-embargo production of Parsifal outside Bayreuth.

== Life and career ==
Viñas was born in Moià, a small town near Barcelona. At the age of 23, he enrolled in singing lessons at the Barcelona Conservatory where he studied under Gonzalo Tintorer Latour. After hearing him in some of the conservatory's concerts, Juan Goula, a principal conductor at the Gran Teatre del Liceu, urged him to study the title role of Lohengrin. Viñas went on to make his operatic debut at the Liceu on 9 February 1888 in Lohengrin. It was to become one of his signature roles. Julián Gayarre, another Spanish tenor noted for his Wagnerian roles, was in the audience at the Liceu for Viñas's debut and was reportedly so impressed with the performance that he gave Viñas his own Lohengrin costume. Viñas soon received invitations to sing at other Spanish opera houses and in Italy. In the space of three years he sang Lohengrin 120 times.

He debuted at Milan's La Scala in 1889 and at Turin's Teatro Regio in 1890, both times as Lohengrin. He first performed at Covent Garden in 1893, though he had earlier appeared in London in 1891, in the first performance there of Cavalleria rusticana. He also debuted in 1893 at the Teatro di San Carlo in Naples as Lohengrin, and at the Metropolitan Opera as Turiddu. He did not reach the San Carlo in Lisbon until 1904, and the Teatro Colón in Buenos Aires until 1910, debuting at both inevitably as Lohengrin. Viñas was a Wagner specialist, but had a repertoire of 37 operas including Verdi, the verismo composers, and French opera. He sang Tristan in 1908 in Lisbon. On 31 December 1913 he sang Parsifal at the Liceu in Barcelona, with Margot Kaftal, Cesare Formichi and Vincenzo Bettoni, on the 30th anniversary of its Bayreuth premiere and thus the first night that the prohibition on its performance elsewhere was lifted. The Barcelona performance started at 10.30pm local time, half an hour before the embargo was officially lifted, to beat the authorised first performance in Bologna - see Parsifal.

His Italian career closed with performances of Lohengrin in Bologna (1913) and Parsifal in Pisa (1914). In 1918 he sang for the last time at the Teatro del Liceo in Barcelona, and after his retirement from the stage, he focused on promoting the Fruit Tree Festival in Moià that he himself had established in 1905. In 1932 he published El arte del canto (republished in 1963).

Viñas was married to the Italian operatic mezzo-soprano Giulia Novelli (1859–1932) with whom he had a daughter, Mercè. His brother Marià Viñas i Dordal was a priest and musician, from 1912 the chapel master of Barcelona Cathedral.

He died in his home town in 1933, from lung cancer.

== Discography ==
Viñas made at least 76 records, 8 for G&T in 1903 and 68 for Fonotipia between 1905 and 1913. A complete reissue of his catalogue has been made by Marston Records.

== Legacy ==
In 1963 the Francisco Viñas Singing Contest was founded in his honor.
