= Luigi Illica =

Italian librettist (1857–1919)

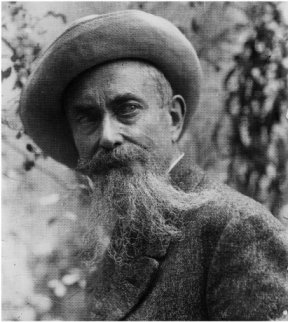
Luigi Illica

Luigi Illica (9 May 1857 – 16 December 1919) was an Italian librettist who wrote for Giacomo Puccini (usually with Giuseppe Giacosa), Pietro Mascagni, Alfredo Catalani, Umberto Giordano, Baron Alberto Franchetti and other important Italian composers. His most famous opera libretti are those for La bohème, Tosca, Madama Butterfly and Andrea Chénier.

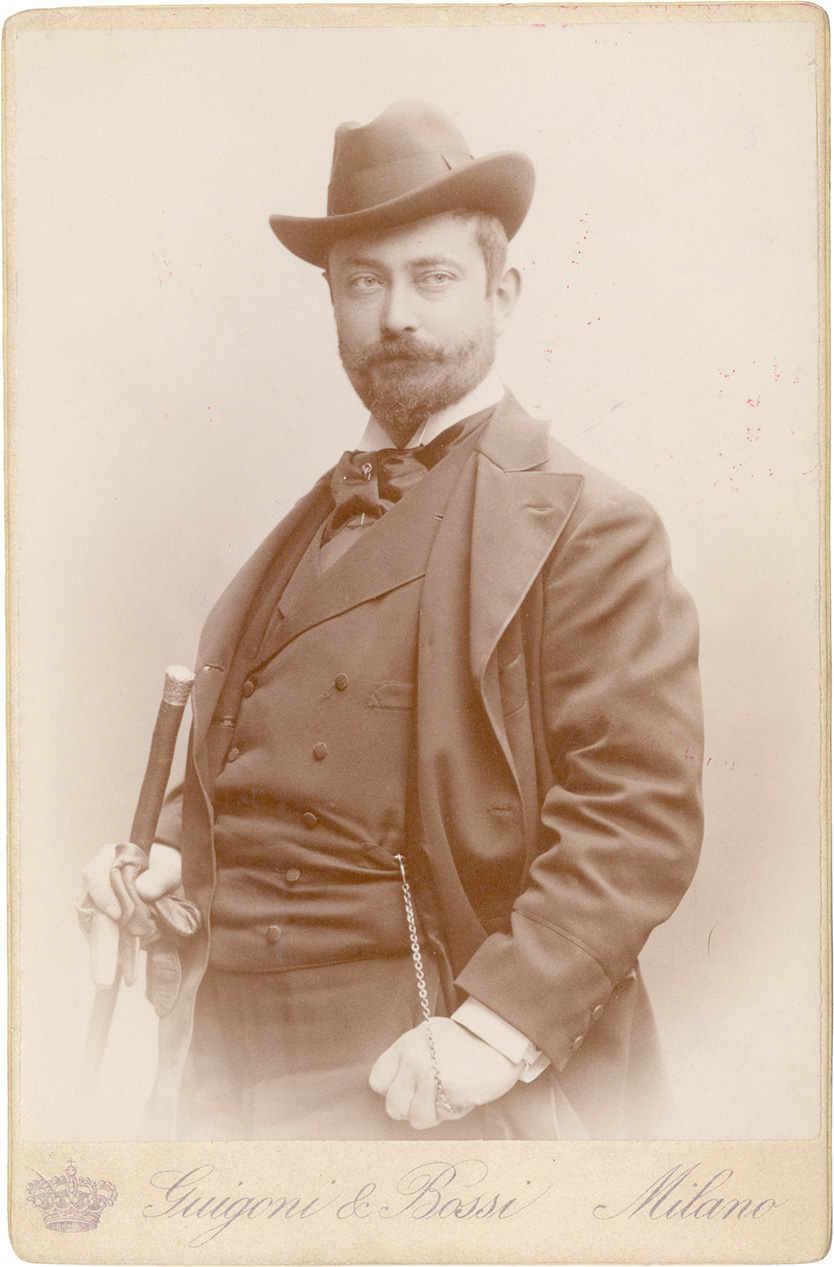
Luigi Illica

Illica was born at Castell'Arquato. His personal life sometimes imitated his libretti. The reason he is always photographed with his head slightly turned is because he lost his right ear in a duel over a woman. When silent films based on Illica's operas were made, his name appeared in large letters on advertisements because distributors could only guarantee that his stories would be used, and not that they would be accompanied by the music of the appropriate composer.

As a playwright of considerable quality, he is today remembered through one of Italy's oldest awards, the Luigi Illica International Prize founded in 1961, which goes to world famous opera singers, opera conductors, directors and authors. The prize is now awarded every two years and alternates with the Illica Opera Stage International Competition, which offers prizes and debut opportunities to young singers.

== Libretti ==
The dates given are those of publication.

- Il vassalo di Szegith (Smareglia, 1884)
- La Wally (Catalani, 1892)
- Cristoforo Colombo (Franchetti, 1892)
- Manon Lescaut (Puccini, 1893)
- Cornelius Schütt (Smareglia, 1893)
- I dispetti amorosi (Luporini, 1894)
- La martire (Samaras, 1894)
- Nozze istriane (Smareglia, 1895)
- La Bohème (Puccini, 1896)
- Andrea Chénier (Giordano, 1896)
- La collana di pasqua (Luporini, 1896)
- Iris (Mascagni, 1898)
- La Colonia Libera (Pietro Floridia, 1899)
- Tosca (Puccini, 1900)
- Anton (Galeotti, 1900)
- Medioevo Latino (Panizza, 1900)
- Le maschere (Mascagni, 1901)
- Il cuore della fanciulla (Buongiorno, 1901)
- Lorenza (Mascheroni, 1901)
- Germania (Franchetti, 1902)
- Nadeya (Cesare Rossi, 1903)
- Siberia (Umberto Giordano; 1903)
- Cassandra (Gnecchi, 1903)
- Madama Butterfly (Puccini, 1904)
- Tess (Erlanger, 1906)
- Aurora (Panizza, 1908)
- Il principe Zilah (Franco Alfano, 1909)
- Hellera (Italo Montemezzi, 1909)
- La Perugina (Edoardo Mascheroni, 1909)
- La Dorise, drama lyrique en trois actes (Galeotti, 1910)
- Isabeau (Mascagni, 1911)
- Judith, musical drama in three acts (Gnecchi, 1914–1952)
- Giove a Pompei (Alberto Franchetti and Umberto Giordano, 1921)

== Filmography ==
- La Wally, directed by Guido Brignone (Italy, 1932)
- Tosca, directed by Carl Koch and Jean Renoir (Italy, 1941)
- Madame Butterfly, directed by Carmine Gallone (Italy, 1954)
- Andrea Chénier, directed by Clemente Fracassi (Italy, 1955)
- Tosca, directed by Carmine Gallone (Italy, 1956)
- La Bohème, directed by Franco Zeffirelli (West Germany, 1965)
- La Bohème, directed by Luigi Comencini (Italy, 1988)
- Madame Butterfly, directed by Frédéric Mitterrand (France, 1995)
- Tosca, directed by Benoît Jacquot (France, 2001)
- La Bohème, directed by Robert Dornhelm (Austria, 2008)

== See also ==
- Tosca
- Giacomo Puccini
- Giuseppe Giacosa
- Madama Butterfly
- La bohème

== Notes ==
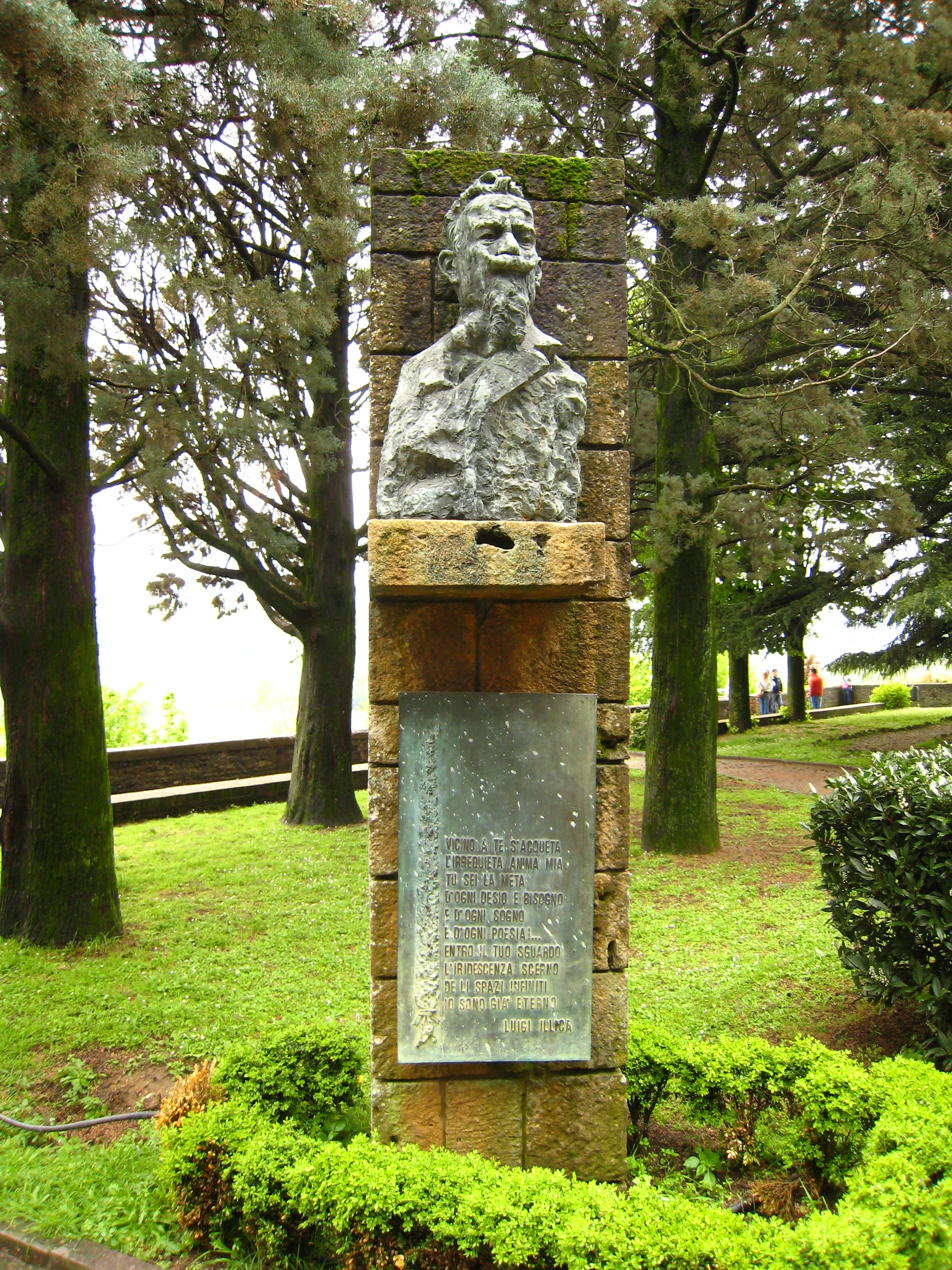
Bust of Luigi Illica at Castell'Arquato
