= Elvira Colonnese =

Italian opera singer

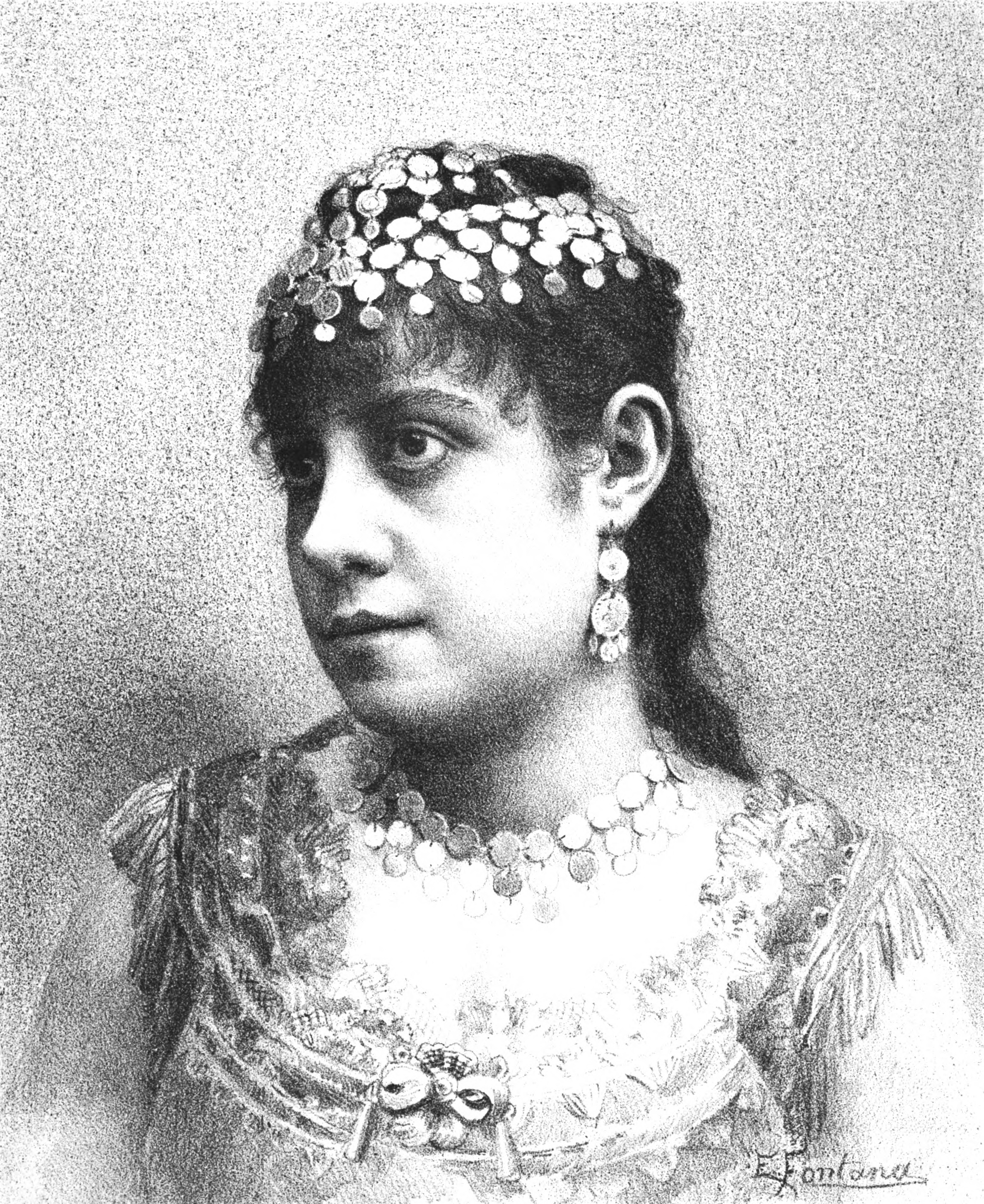
Elvira Colonnese, from an 1887 publication.

Elvira Colonnese (September 9, 1859 — June 10, 1949) was an Italian soprano opera singer.

== Early life ==
Colonnese was from Naples, Kingdom of the Two Sicilies, the niece of Luigi Colonnese, an operatic baritone.

== Career ==
Colonnese's first stage appearance came in 1880, in Naples, when she sang in Alpigianina at the conservatory in San Sebastiano. Soon after, she made her professional debut in La Sonnambula at the Liceu in Barcelona. In 1882 she was a member of the Italian Opera Company at St. Petersburg. She maintained a steady career in opera for 25 years, through 1905, performing in both Europe and South America, with regular appearances in Buenos Aires and Montevideo. Some of her typical roles were Micaela in Carmen, Elsa in Lohengrin, Desdemona in Otello, and the title role in Aida. In 1890, she sang in the inaugural performance at the Teatro Argentino de La Plata. She played both Queen Isabella and Iguamota in the 1892 premiere cast of Alberto Franchetti's Cristoforo Colombo in Genoa, staged to mark the 400th anniversary of Columbus's famous voyage. She also taught voice classes in Buenos Aires.

== Personal life ==
Elvira Colonnese died in Naples in 1949, aged 89 years.
