= Iris (opera) =

Opera in three acts by Pietro Mascagni

- Opera by Pietro Mascagni
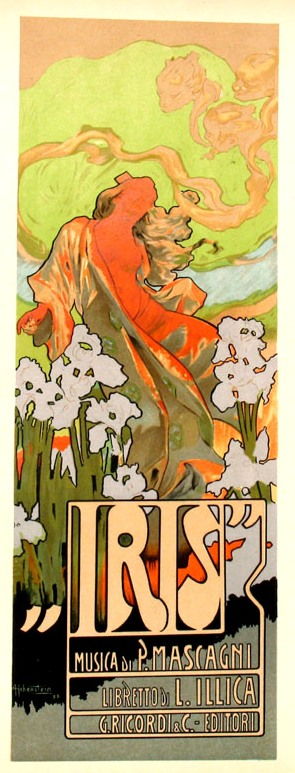
- Poster by Casa Ricordi, 1898
- Librettist: Luigi Illica
- Language: Italian
- Premiere: 22 November 1898; Teatro Costanzi, Rome

Iris (Italian: [ˈiːris]) is an opera in three acts by Pietro Mascagni to an original Italian libretto by Luigi Illica. It premiered on 22 November 1898 at the Teatro Costanzi in Rome. The story is set in Japan during legendary times.

== Background and performance history ==
In common with all of Mascagni's full-length operas, Iris is now rarely performed, even in Italy, although along with L'amico Fritz it remains one of the composer's more performed operas. Two of the opera's most memorable numbers are the tenor's serenade ("Apri la tua finestra") and the Hymn to the Sun ("Inno al Sole").

The so-called "aria della piovra" ("Octopus aria"), "Un dì, ero piccina", where Iris describes a screen she had seen in a Buddhist temple when she was a child, depicting an octopus coiling its tentacles around a young woman, is a rare Western use of the popular Japanese tentacle erotica (shokushu zeme, 触手責め, "tentacle attack") tradition, exemplified in the print The Dream of the Fisherman's Wife (1814) by Hokusai.

== Roles ==
Roles, voice types, premiere cast
Role	Voice type	Premiere cast, 22 November 1898 Conductor: Pietro Mascagni
Iris	soprano	Hariclea Darclée
Il Cieco	bass	Giuseppe Tisci Rubini
Osaka	tenor	Fernando De Lucia
Kyoto	baritone	Guglielmo Caruson
Geisha	soprano	Ernestina Tilde Milanesi
Haberdasher	tenor	Eugenio Grossi
Rag merchant	tenor	Piero Schiavazzi
Chorus: shopkeepers, geishas, laundry girls, samurai, citizens

== Synopsis ==
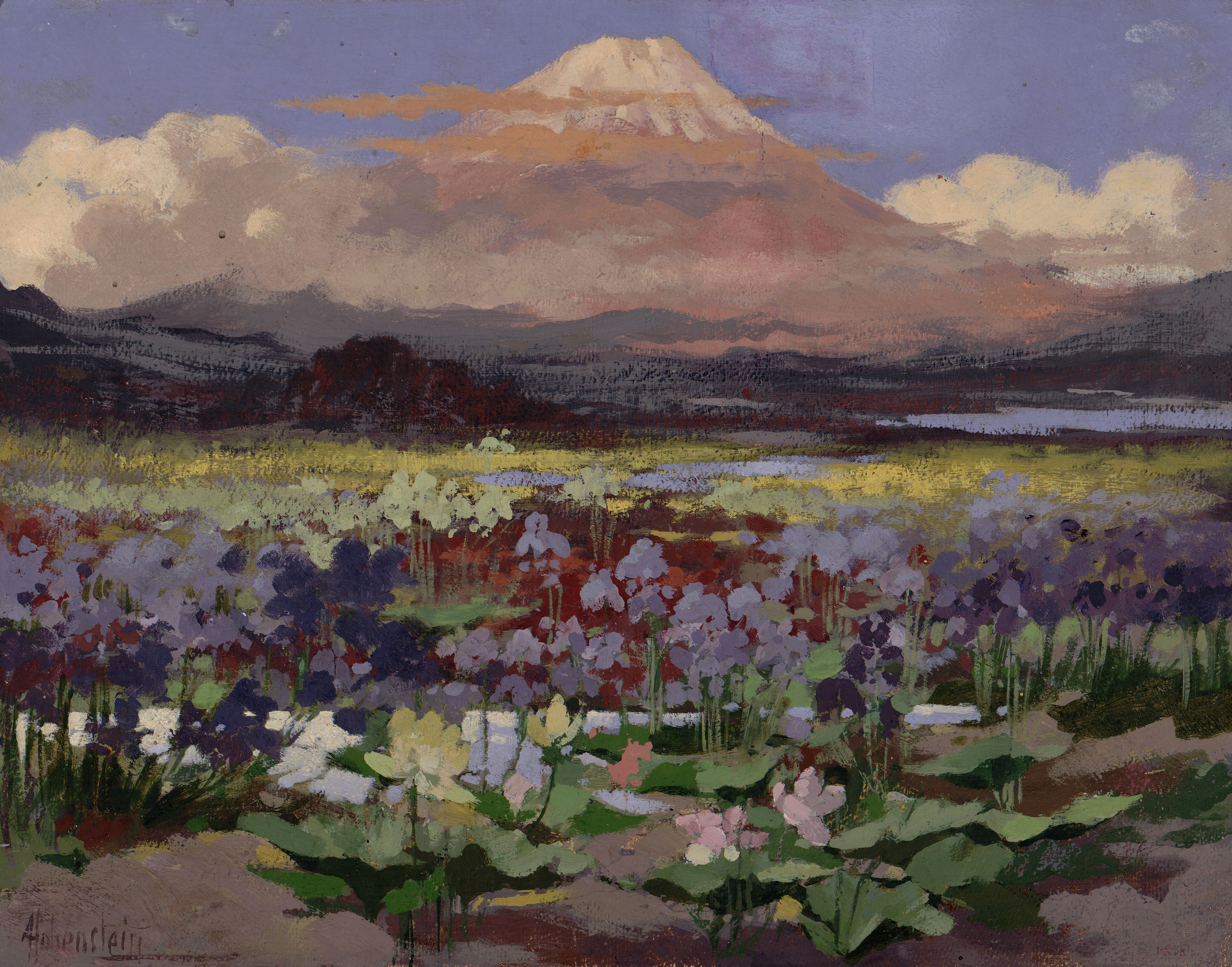
Distesa di iris, set design for Iris act 3 (1898).

Act 1

The opera begins with an invisible choir singing a "Hymn to the Sun", the second best-known piece in the opera. However, it should be called "Hymn of the Sun", since it is sung by the sun itself (as a choir).

Iris, the young and innocent daughter of a blind old man, Il Cieco, lives happily, enjoying the sun and the simple things of nature. Osaka, a young lord in search of adventures, plans to kidnap her with the help of Kyoto who keeps a geisha house. During a puppet show, Osaka enters disguised as a child of the sun, singing the serenade "Apri la tua finestra [Open Your Window]", the most famous selection in the opera. He conquers the heart of Iris, and Samurai carry her off, conducting her to Kyoto's geisha house called Yoshiwara. Before leaving, Kyoto anonymously leaves money on Il Cieco's doorstep, as well as a note telling him where she has gone and implying that she has abandoned him.

Act 2

At Yoshiwara, where, according to the libretto, the sun never penetrates, Iris wakes up under the illusion of having died and gone to Paradise. Osaka arrives and tries to seduce her but fails to persuade her to yield to his advances. Tired and annoyed by her simplicity and innocence, Osaka tells Kyoto to get rid of her. Instead Kyoto, hoping to make some profit off Iris, exposes her to the crowds on a balcony of the house. Il Cieco, having assumed that Iris went to the geisha house of her own accord, comes there. He curses her, repeatedly flinging mud in her face. She is overwhelmed by sudden madness at her father's incomprehensible actions. Before anyone, including the remorse-stricken Osaka who has returned, can stop her, Iris rushes back into the house and throws herself down a shaft leading to a sewer.

Act 3

The next morning in the sewer, ragpickers begin stealing Iris' silken clothing; she revives, frightening away the ragpickers. She quickly becomes delirious and imagines that she hears the voices of the three men, first Osaka, then Kyoto, and finally Il Cieco, each mocking her. She rejoices when she feels the warm rays of the rising sun, accompanied by a return of the "Hymn to the Sun", and she dies. Tendrils of flowers bear the soul of Iris to heaven.

== Instrumentation ==
Woodwinds	Percussion	Strings
2 flutes	Timpani (set of 4)	Violin I, II
1 piccolo (doubles fife)	Bass drum	Viola
2 oboes	Cymbals	Celli
1 English horn	Triangle	Double basses
2 Clarinets	Glockenspiel	2 harps
1 bass clarinet	Giuoco di tam tams (13 tuned tam tams A2–A3; Note these will need to be hung on 2 racks)	Shamisen
2 bassoons	Large tam tam	
1 contrabassoon	Small tam tam	
Brass	Tambourine	
4 horns	Timpani giapponese	
3 trumpets		
4 trombones		
4 cornetts		
