= Titta Ruffo =

Italian opera singer (1877–1953)

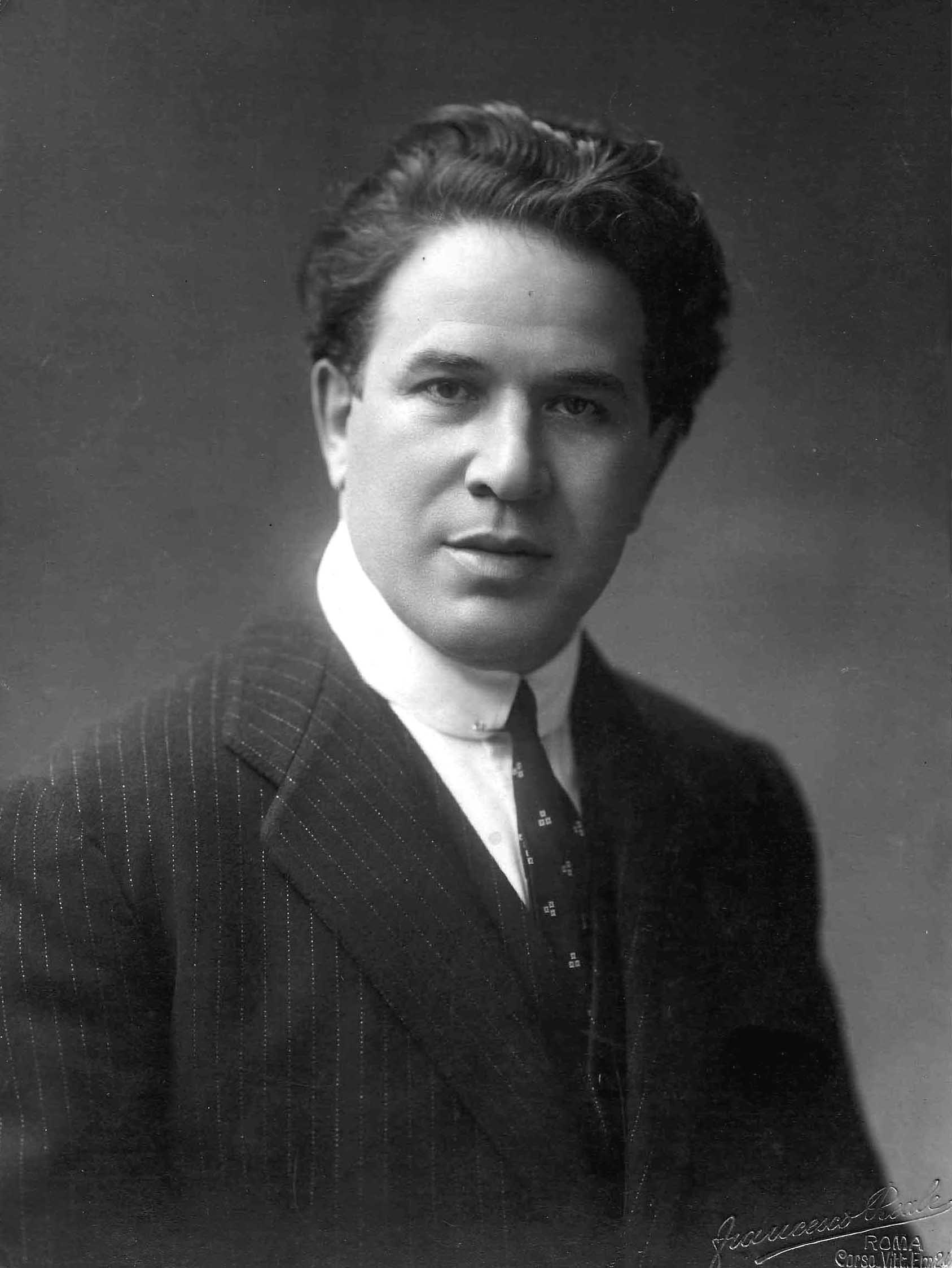
- Portrait, c. 1920s
- Born: Ruffo Cafiero Titta; 9 September 1877; Pisa, Italy
- Died: 5 July 1953 (aged 75); Florence, Italy
- Occupation: Operatic baritone
- Years active: 1898–1931

Titta Ruffo (born Ruffo Cafiero Titta; 9 June 1877 – 5 July 1953) was an Italian operatic baritone who had a major international singing career. Known as the "Voce del leone" ("voice of the lion"), he was greatly admired, even by rival baritones, such as Giuseppe De Luca, who said of Ruffo: "His was not a voice, it was a miracle" (although not often published is the second part of De Luca's conclusion "which he [Ruffo] bawled away..."), and Victor Maurel, the creator of Verdi's Iago and Falstaff. Maurel said that the notes of Ruffo's upper register were the most glorious baritone sounds he had ever heard (see Pleasants, cited below). Indeed Walter Legge, the prominent classical record producer, went so far as to call Ruffo "a genius".

== Biography ==
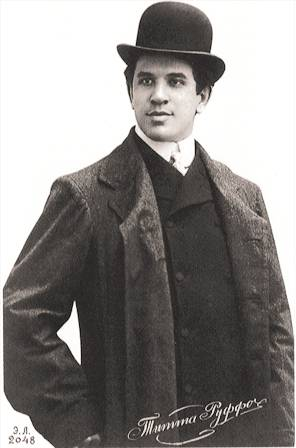
Titta Ruffo early in his career

Born Ruffo Titta in Pisa (he reversed his forename and surname for the stage), Ruffo was the son of a foreman at an ironworks, who named him after a favourite dog, Ruffo. His mother only ever called him "Cafiero". He studied singing and voice production with several teachers.

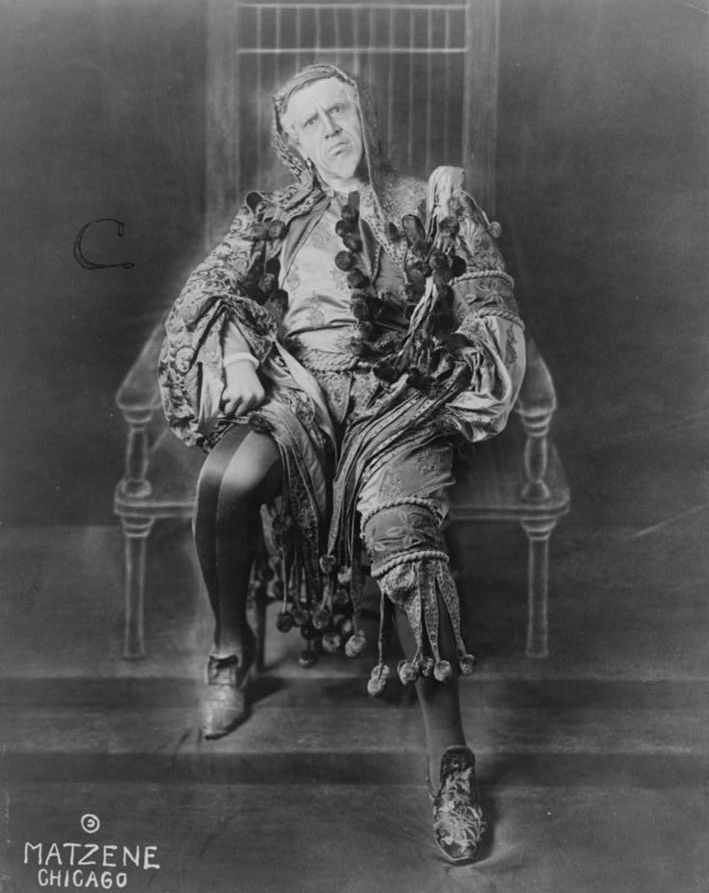
Ruffo as Rigoletto

Ruffo made his operatic debut in 1898 at the Teatro Costanzi in Rome as the Herald in Wagner's Lohengrin. After a slow start, his career took off in the early 1900s and he quickly achieved international renown due to the power and ardency of voice and acting.

His other major debuts occurred in the following venues and years: Buenos Aires (1902), London (1903), Milan (1904), Lisbon (1907), the Paris Opéra (1911) and the Theatro Municipal (São Paulo) (1911). (Note: Ruffo's brother Ettore Titta was also a composer, and wrote an opera Malena, from which Ruffo recorded two arias in 1907 with the composer conducting: "Disse il saggio" and "Ma tu sfiorata di rugiada gentil"; the former was re-released on 10" 78 rpm La voce del padrone DA 162. See also costume designs for the opera. Ruffo also recorded two songs with orchestra by his brother in 1914, "E suonan le campane" and "Oh che m'importa", re-released on La voce del padrone DA 356.) At the Teatro Colón in Buenos Aires, Ruffo sang in 25 different operas during nine seasons between 1908 and 1931. Ruffo made his American debut in Philadelphia in 1912 and sang extensively in Chicago. He reached the New York Metropolitan Opera relatively late in his career, in 1922, as Figaro in The Barber of Seville, having enlisted in the Italian army during World War I. He would give a total of 46 performances at the Met from 1922 through to 1929. While committed to the Met he was a pupil of voice teacher Estelle Liebling. In 1929 he signed a $350,000 (approximately $6,563,000 today) movie contract.

He retired in 1931, staying for several years in exile Switzerland and Paris. He wrote an autobiography, La mia parabola, which was translated into English in 1995 as My Parabola. In 1937 he returned to Italy, where he was later arrested by the authorities for opposing the Fascist regime and espousing socialist beliefs. His sister was married to Giacomo Matteotti, after whose murder by the Fascists he had vowed never to sing in Italy again. In the later years of his life, he maintained friendships with a variety of singers, notably with baritones Gino Bechi, Carlo Tagliabue and tenors Giacomo Lauri-Volpi and Giuseppe di Stefano.

Titta Ruffo died in Florence, Italy from heart disease on 5 July 1953, aged 76.

== Vocal characteristics and recorded legacy ==
Ruffo's repertoire included most of the major baritone roles in French and Italian opera, including among others Rigoletto, Di Luna, Amonasro, Germont, Tonio, Rossini's Figaro, Valentin, Iago, Carlo (in both Ernani and La forza del destino), Nabucco, Vasco, Don Giovanni, Barnaba, Scarpia, Marcello, and Renato in Un ballo in maschera. He was also renowned for his interpretations of several baritone parts in operas that are largely forgotten today, namely, the title roles in Ambroise Thomas's Hamlet and Franchetti's Cristoforo Colombo plus Cascart in Leoncavallo's Zazà and Neri in Giordano's La cena delle beffe.

Like his tenor contemporary Enrico Caruso, Ruffo was said to embody a new style of singing in which power, declamatory force and a rich, chesty tone eclipsed the previous generation's emphasis on vocal grace, flexibility and technical finesse. Consequently, some conservative commentators compared Ruffo unfavorably with his elegant Italian predecessor Mattia Battistini, who was a master of bel canto and the possessor of a leaner, more silvery timbre than Ruffo's. However, according to modern-day critics like John Steane and Michael Scott, the difference between the two great baritones was not quite as clear cut as some have suggested in the past, because both Battistini and Ruffo displayed exceptional vocal agility and control plus the ability to sustain a long legato line. Both of them also favored a virile interpretive style and even shared a teacher in Venceslao Persichini.

Writing in the Gramophone magazine in 1928, the often acerbic British critic and future record producer, Walter Legge, lauded Ruffo's singing, recalling a recital that he had heard the baritone give six years earlier in London. Legge said that: "From his first phrase the audience was vanquished by the overwhelming beauty of his voice—manly, broad, sympathetic, of unsurpassed richness. Such ease of production, such abundance of ringing high Gs! But more: Ruffo's infinite subtlety, variety of tone-colour, interpretive insight and sincerity, his magnificent control, stupendous breathing powers, and impeccable phrasing stamped him as a genius."

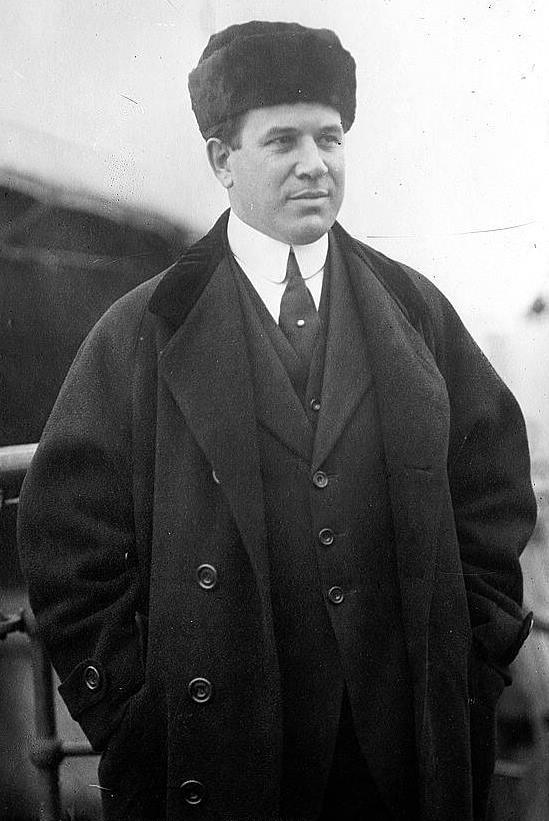
Titta Ruffo in the US, c. 1910–15

Ruffo was a prolific recording artist. He made more than 130 78-rpm records, both acoustic and electric, first for Pathé Frères in Paris in 1904, and then exclusively for La voce del padrone beginning in 1906. Upon arriving in the United States in 1912 he began his long association with the Victor Talking Machine Company which concluded in 1929. As was the case with Caruso, Ruffo's voice recorded remarkably well; it was so rich and resonant that even on the primitive acoustic recording process, much glory remains to be heard. He continued recording into the electrical recording era after 1925, but at far as one is able to judge (many titles remain unpublished) most of his published electrical recordings caught him past his prime, with what Steane calls a "hollowness" now evident in his mid-range. However, the unpublished Victor electrics, and some unpublished sides made even later, in London in 1933 are more than touching "beaux restes", with (strangely, compared with the published electrical recordings) a great deal of voice, technique and charm still surviving to this late date.

As Steane and Pleasants mention, Ruffo made records at his peak of two arias which stand-out as exemplars of his voice and style. The first example is the Brindisi from Hamlet (made in 1907 and remade in 1911), the cadenza of which demonstrates his astounding élan and breath control. The second is the unaccompanied "All'erta, marinar!" from Meyerbeer's L'Africaine, which exhibits the resonance, power and brilliance of his upper register. For examples of his vocal agility, his early discs of "Largo al factotum" from Il barbiere di Siviglia stand out. Other discs of arias singled out for praise by Pleasants, Steane and/or Scott include Ruffo's acoustic Victor recordings of the following arias: "Pari siamo", "Urna fatale", "Credo in un Dio crudel", "Tremin gl'insani", "Buona Zazà, del mio buon tempo", "Nemico della patria" and the "Prologo" from Pagliacci. All these recordings can be heard on CD collections issued by the Pearl and Preiser labels.

A heavily processed transfer (below) of "Sì, pel ciel marmoreo giuro!" (with Enrico Caruso). For a superior "more natural straight transfer" (at the correct playing speed) see: http://www.loc.gov/jukebox/recordings/detail/id/3656

Unusual for his era, Ruffo was never under exclusive contract to any one opera company; he was an operatic freelancer, a nomadic star in his own right and received top billing—and top fees—wherever he sang. Ruffo was the only male opera singer of his time who could compete, in terms of celebrity and fees, with Caruso. Surprisingly, they sang together infrequently and made only one commercially issued recording: an electrifying 1914 performance of the Oath Duet from Giuseppe Verdi's Otello. Two explanations have been adduced by historians for this happenstance. First, professional jealousy: neither Ruffo nor Caruso liked sharing the glory with another extravagantly gifted star (though virtually all intimates of Caruso have denied this). Secondly, few opera houses could have afforded to pay both singers' enormous fees in conjunction, especially if there was an expensive diva appearing in the same production.

Ruffo refused to teach voice after his retirement, stating: "I never knew how to sing; that is why my voice went by the time I was fifty. I have no right to capitalize on my former name and reputation and try to teach youngsters something I never knew how to do myself." However, as Ruffo's decline started around 1924–25, this means that he had a very respectable 26–27 years in good form, which is remarkable in any case.

== Bibliography ==
- Farkas, Andrew (Ed.), Titta Ruffo: An Anthology (Greenwood Press 1984).
- Hamilton, David, ed., The Metropolitan Opera Encyclopedia (Simon & Schuster, New York 1987).
- Pleasants, Henry, The Great Singers (Simon & Schuster, New York 1966).
- Scott, Michael, The Record of Singing, Volume One (Duckworth, London, 1977.)
- Seltsam, William H., Metropolitan Opera Annals (H.W. Wilson Co., New York 1947).
- Steane, J.B., The Grand Tradition (Amadeus Press, Portland 1993).
- Tuggle, Robert. The Golden Age of Opera (Holt, Rinehart, and Winston, 1983).
- Mouchon, Jean-Pierre, "Les Enregistrements du Baryton Titta Ruffo. Guide Analytique". Foreword and Chronology by Dr. Ruffo Titta Jr (Académie Régionale de Chant Lyrique, Marseilles, France, first edition, 1990, 2nd and 3r ed. 1991, 538 pp., ill.ISBN 2-909366-02-2)
