= Asrael =

Opera by composer Alberto Franchetti

- leggenda by Alberto Franchetti
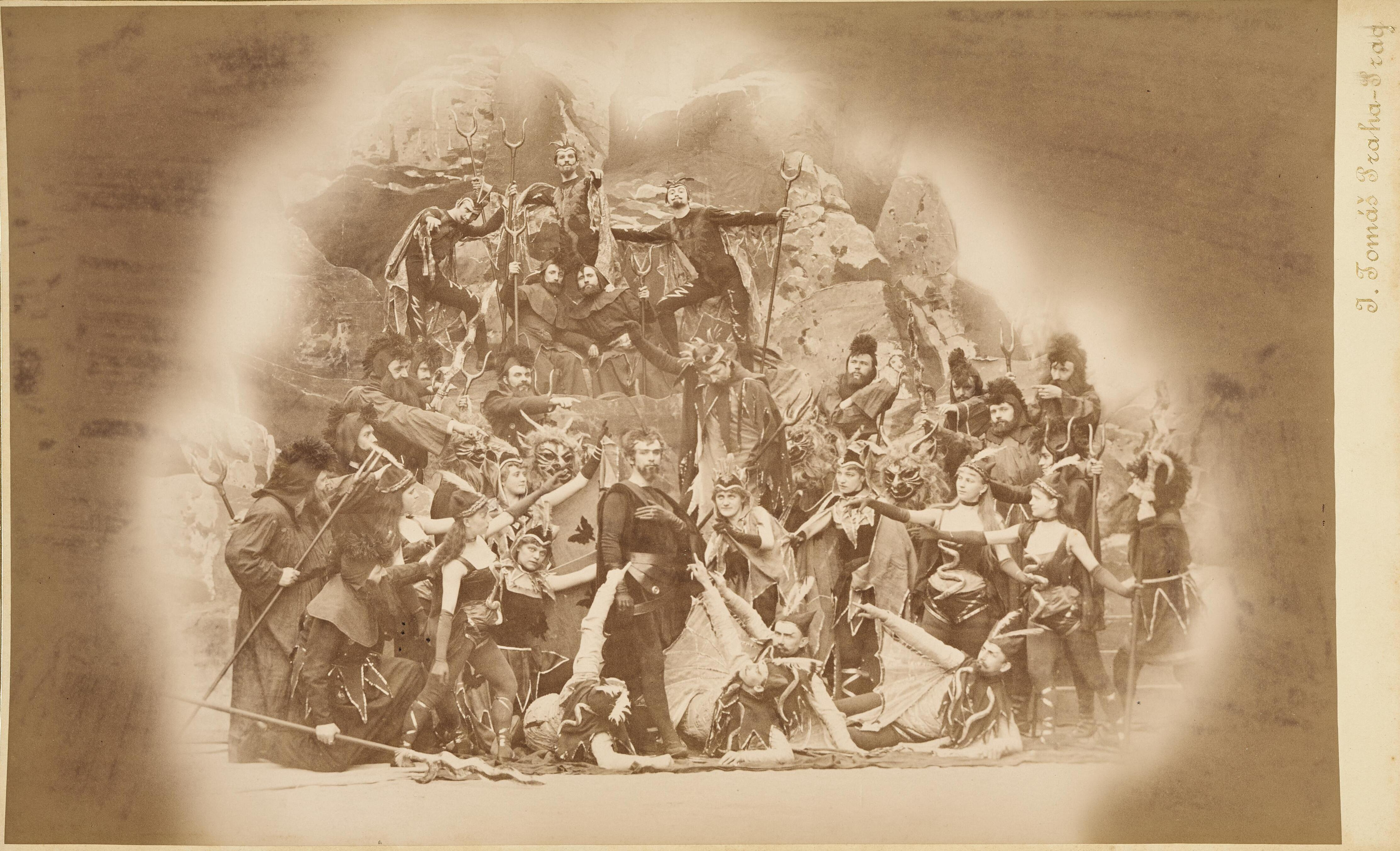
- cast of the 1890 Prague production
- Librettist: Ferdinando Fontana
- Language: Italian
- Premiere: 11 February 1888; Teatro Municipale di Reggio

Asrael is a leggenda or opera in four acts by composer Alberto Franchetti and librettist Ferdinando Fontana. The plot, based on German fairy tales and folklore, displays the conflict between the spirit of evil and the spirit of Christian love, represented by Asrael and Nefta respectively. The work is Franchetti's first opera and displays strong influences of Meyerbeer and Wagner, mixed with late 19th-century Italian idioms. The opera premiered at the Teatro Municipale di Reggio on 11 February 1888. The opera made its United States debut at the Metropolitan Opera on 26 November 1890 with Andreas Dippel in the title role. The cast also included soprano Marie Jahn as Nefta/Suor Clotilde and contralto Marie Ritter-Götze as Loretta.

== Roles ==
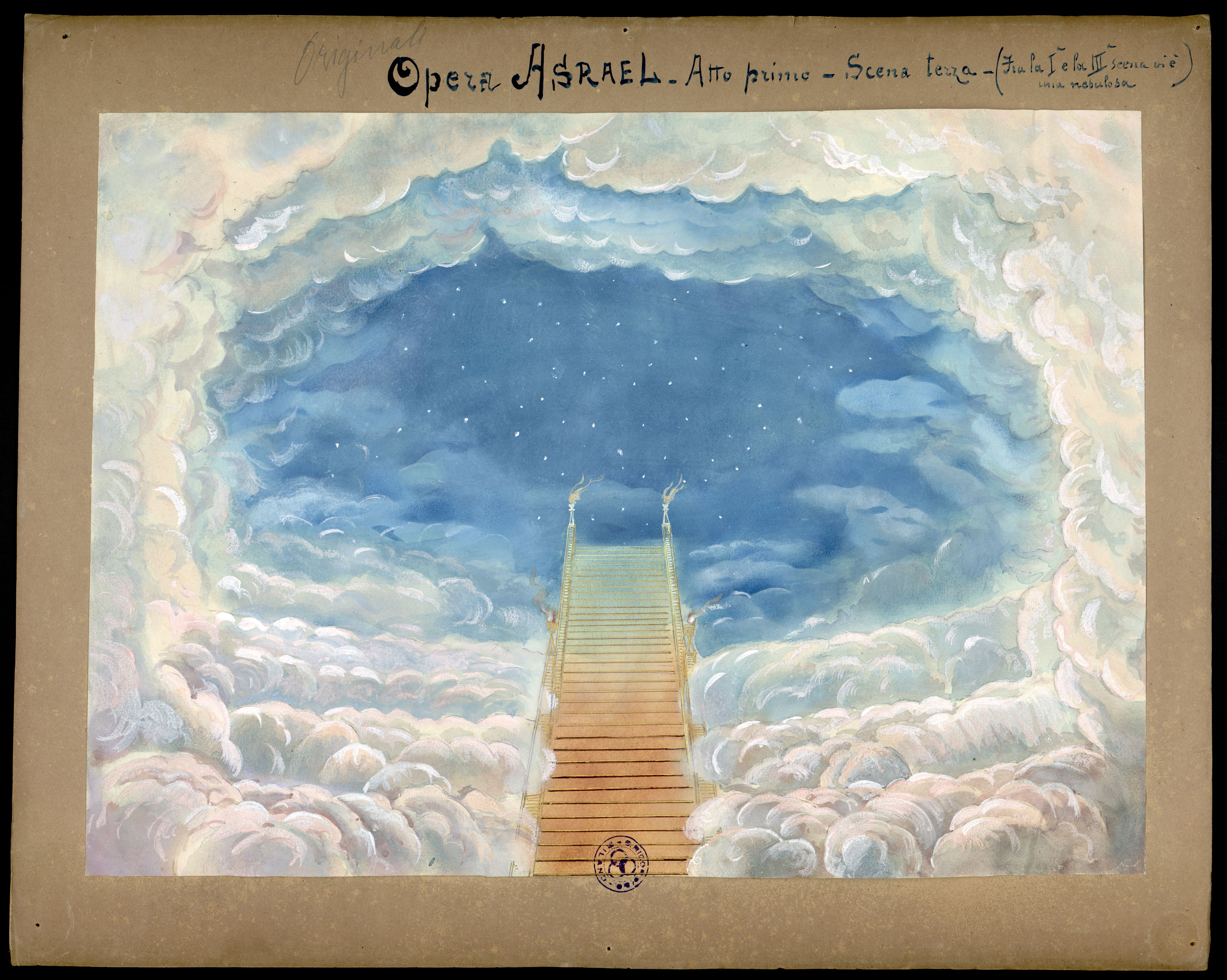
In cielo. Anfiteatro di nubi tagliato da una scala d'oro, set design for Asreal act 1 scene 3 (undated).

Roles, voice types, premiere cast
Role	Voice type	Premiere cast, 11 February 1888
Nefta/Suor Clotilde	soprano	Virginia Damerini
Asrael	tenor	Ladislao Mierzwinski
Loretta	mezzo-soprano	Giulia Novelli
Lucifero/re di Brabante	bass	Lodovico Contini
Lidoria	contralto	Maria Pia
Contadino	bass	Francesco Carmignani
Araldo	bass	Ulisse Peroni
