= Luigi Capranica =

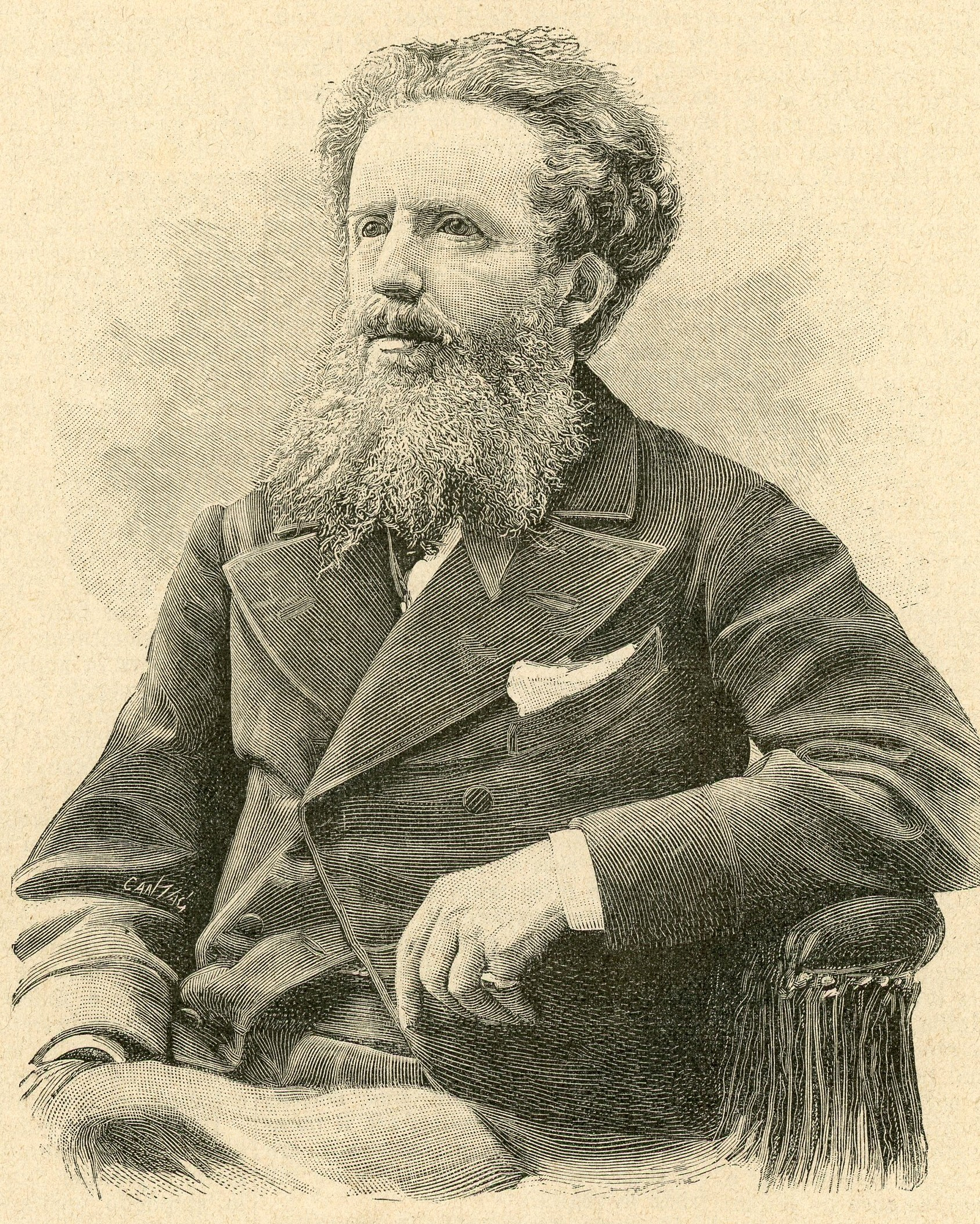

Luigi Capranica del Grillo (13 November 1821 – 7 January 1891) was an Italian novelist, dramatist, and patriot.

== Biography ==
Luigi Capranica was born in Rome to local nobility: his father was a descendant of the Marquis del Grillo through his father, and through his mother, principessa Flaminia of the Odescalchi family. While his parents intended him to study for advancement in the curia, he instead joined the guardia nobile of the pope. However, he developed interest as a writer and in 1848, he wrote La Congiura dei Fieschi and then Francesco Ferruccio. Soon Rome was immersed in revolution, and in 1849, Luigi fought alongside the Republicans against the French and Papal forces. With the defeat of the Roman republic, and the restoration of Pope Pius IX, he was briefly jailed, released, wounded in a duel, then exiled. Luigi made his way to Venice where he stayed over a decade. But often his revolutionary leanings led to renewed exiles. During this exile, he wrote the play Vittoria Accoramboni. Ultimately he moved to Milan in 1861 where he stayed for 3 decades and married the Contessa Maria Obniski.

In Venice, he had begun writing poetry and novels. The latter were mainly based on Italian agents in history: Giovanni dalle Bande Nere (1857), Congiura di Brescia, Fra Paolo Sarpi (1863), Donna Olimpia Panfili (1868), Papa Sisto (1877), Re Manfredi (1884), Maria Dolores, Le donne di Nerone (1890), and I Moderni Farisei.
