= José Oxilia =

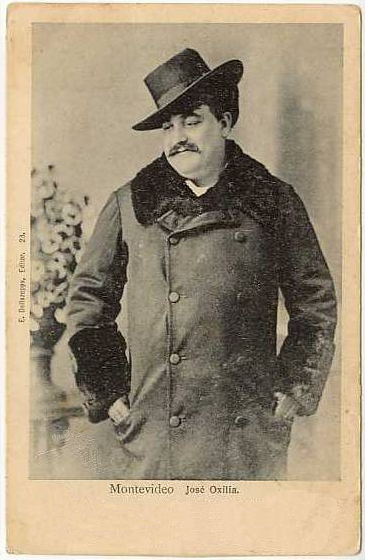
José Oxilia ca. 1900

José Oxilia, also known in Italy as Giuseppe Oxilia (Montevideo, 3 June 1861 - 18 May 1919) was a Uruguayan operatic tenor.

He enjoyed great success in both Uruguay and Italy.
