= Alberto Franchetti =

Italian composer (1860–1942)

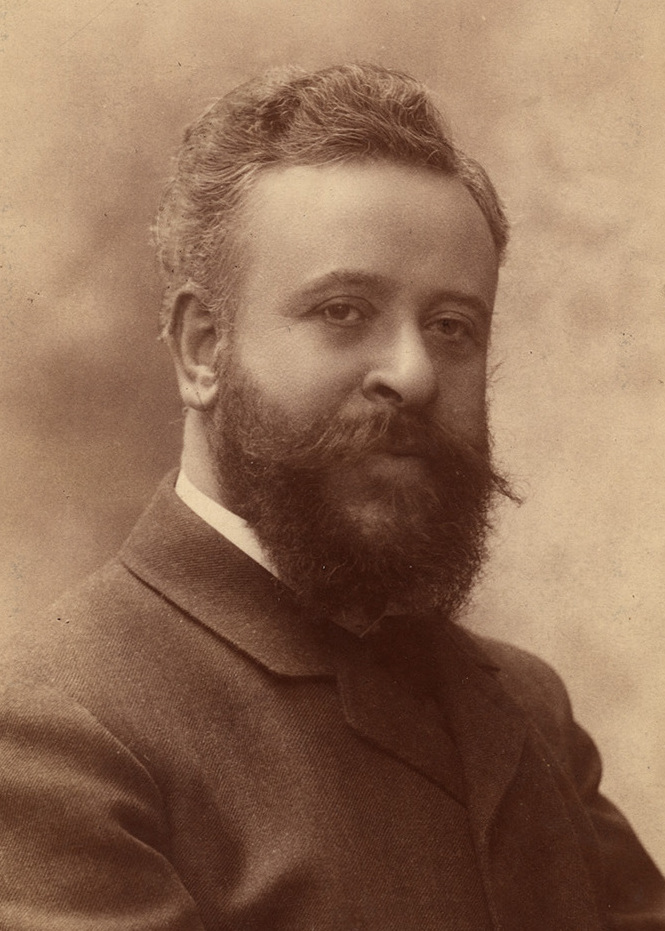
- Franchetti in 1902

Background information
- Born: Alberto Franchetti; 18 September 1860; Turin, Piedmont, Italy
- Died: 4 August 1942 (aged 81) Viareggio, Italy
- Genre: Classical
- Occupations: composer, racing driver

Alberto Franchetti (18 September 1860 – 4 August 1942) was an Italian composer and racing driver, best known for the 1902 opera Germania.

== Biography ==
Alberto Franchetti was born in Turin, a Jewish nobleman of independent means. He studied first in Venice, then at the Munich Conservatory under Josef Rheinberger, and finally in Dresden under Felix Draeseke. His first major success occurred in 1888 with his opera Asrael. His operatic style combined Wagnerianism and the traits of Meyerbeer with Italian verismo. During his life, critics sometimes referred to him as the "Meyerbeer of modern Italy."

The words of music critic G. B. Nappi sum up Franchetti's primary talents: "His character is perhaps unsuitable for passionate dramas, but rather for those subjects, where the fantastic, romantic and epic are required in the symphonic texture and large choral pictures. In this regard Alberto Franchetti knows that he has no rival" (from "Orfeo" 6.3, 1915).

Grove considers Cristoforo Colombo (1892) Franchetti's best work. However, his most popular opera was Germania (1902; libretto by Luigi Illica). It clung to the general operatic repertoire until the First World War; it was performed worldwide, and Arturo Toscanini (who conducted the work at La Scala) and Enrico Caruso held it in high regard. Caruso included a couple of the arias in his very first commercial recording session in 1902 (with piano accompaniment) and repeated one piece the following year for the Zonophone company. He recorded the same two arias with orchestra in 1910 when he appeared in a revival of the work in New York. But by the war, Germania had lapsed into obscurity. Mosco Carner notes that Illica's libretto of Tosca, or at least the sketch for a libretto, was first offered to Franchetti, who, too busy with other projects at the time, passed it on to his friend Puccini. Other authors have stated that Franchetti was working on the opera but Puccini asked Ricordi to let him have it and that Franchetti was persuaded that the violence in the story made it unsuitable for an opera. Another version is that Franchetti waived his rights to the opera because he felt that Puccini would make a better job of it - this is believed to have been stated by the Franchetti family. However, Franchetti worked three months at Tosca, he later said:"I didn't hear the music, the subject being too dramatical instead of melo-dramatical. He solemnly gave his sketches to Puccini, which used the first three bars.

Of Franchetti's opera Glauco only the reduction for piano survived, but the composers Torsten Rasch and Helmut Krausser reconstructed seven of the finest pieces of this opera. Find them at YouTube.

Among the reasons for Franchetti's descent into obscurity is the fact that, after the promulgation of the Fascist Racial Laws of 1938, which largely disenfranchised Italy's Jewish population, Franchetti's works were banned from performance. This was despite a plea for tolerance on his behalf from Pietro Mascagni to Benito Mussolini, which was rejected, just before Franchetti's death.

Recent revivals and recordings of Cristoforo Colombo and Germania (Berlin Oper 2006/7) show his work to be of genuine quality with a fine ability in orchestration and use of the chorus, symphonic in style. These traits, along with an unfortunate tendency for two-dimensional characters, were recognised early.

He also wrote a Symphony in E minor. He was the director of the Florence Conservatory from 1926 to 1928: it was the only musical post he ever held. He died in Viareggio in 1942, aged 81. Franchetti's main residence, the substantial Villa Franchetti (Nardi) in Florence, was accepted as a "Historical Residence of Italy" in 1991. In 2009 it became a hotel as well as a home, preserving much of its historical fabric. The villa, with its numerous outbuildings, was rescued from near dereliction by its current owner, Gustavo Nardi, who writes of the villa's connections with Franchetti (http://www.villanardifirenze.com/History)

Franchetti was an early pioneer of motor racing, having co-founded the Italian Motorists' Club in 1897 and participated in the inaugural Mille Miglia in 1927. He won the inaugural Coppa Florio in 1900.

His son Arnold Franchetti (1911–1993) became a composer after emigrating to the United States in 1949. Before coming to the US, he studied physics at the University of Florence, music at the Salzburg Mozarteum, and then moved to Munich where he studied composition and orchestration with Richard Strauss for three years. He was a member of the World War 2 Italian Resistance Underground movement from 1946 to 1948. Arnold Franchetti was Professor of Composition at the Hartt School of Music, University of Hartford, Connecticut from 1950 until his retirement in 1979.

== Performed operatic works ==
- Asrael (1888)
- Cristoforo Colombo, libretto by Luigi Illica (1892)
- Fior d'Alpe (1894)
- Il signor di Pourceaugnac (1897)
- Germania, libretto by Luigi Illica (1902)
- La figlia di Iorio, libretto by Gabriele D'Annunzio (1906)
- Notte di leggenda (1915)
- Giove a Pompei, joint composition with Umberto Giordano (1921)
- Glauco (1922)
- Don Buonaparte (written 1939 -performed 2023)

== Literature ==
- Rosenthal, Harold and John Warrack. (1979, 2nd ed.). The Concise Oxford Dictionary of Opera. London, New York and Melbourne: Oxford University Press. p. 178. ISBN 0-19-311318-X.
