= Mese mariano =

Opera by Umberto Giordano

- Opera by Umberto Giordano
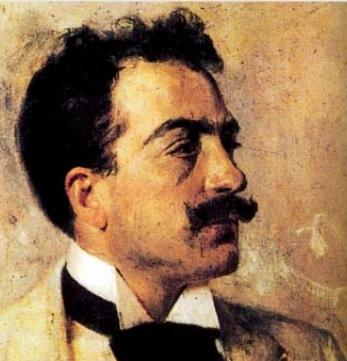
- The composer
- Librettist: Salvatore Di Giacomo
- Premiere: 17 March 1910; Teatro Massimo, Palermo

Mese mariano (Mary's Month) is an opera in one act by Umberto Giordano. Its Italian libretto by Salvatore Di Giacomo was adapted from his play 'O Mese Mariano, which was in turn adapted from his novella, Senza vederlo (Without Seeing Him). It premiered at the Teatro Massimo in Palermo on 17 March 1910. The opera is described as a bozzetto lirico (lyric sketch) and has a running time of 35 minutes. It tells the story of a woman who visits an orphanage to see her child. Racked with guilt at having abandoned him, she is unaware that he had died the night before.

== Composition history ==
The play which forms the basis for the libretto was immensely popular in its day. Written in Neapolitan language, it was first performed at the Teatro San Fernando in Naples on 20 January 1900. Giordano, who had seen the play in Milan, was deeply touched by it and asked Di Giacomo to adapt it for an opera. Di Giacomo accepted and agreed to make some changes from the original drama. The setting of the opening scene which allowed Giordano to include a children's chorus was changed to the sunny courtyard in the orphanage with views of the Neapolitan landscape in the distance. The roles of the nuns also became more prominent, making the opera largely one of female voices. In this respect and in terms of its plot, Giordano's work pre-figures Puccini's Suor Angelica which was composed some seven years later.

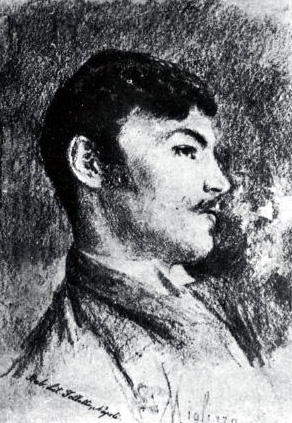
Librettist Salvatore Di Giacomo

== Performance history ==
Mese Mariano premiered at the Teatro Massimo in Palermo on 17 March 1910 conducted by Leopoldo Mugnone with Livia Berlendi in the leading role of Carmela. It was warmly received both in Palermo and in Rome where it was performed a month later at the Teatro Costanzi. On that occasion it was conducted by Pietro Mascagni and presented as a double bill with his Cavalleria rusticana. Emma Carelli sang the role of Carmela.

However, when the opera was first performed in Naples (10 April 1911 at the Teatro San Carlo), it was not a critical success, and Giordano and Di Giacomo further revised the work in 1913. Although Mascagni considered it one of Giordano's best operas, Mese Mariano never achieved the same success as Di Giacomo's play or as Giordano's other (longer) operas, Andrea Chénier and Fedora.

Even in Italy, performances following its initial runs in 1910 and 1911 have been sporadic. In 1931 and 1932, La Scala produced the work and also broadcast it; Augusta Oltrabella appeared in both productions in the leading role of Carmela, according to the notes by Clemens Hoslinger on the Lebendige Vergangenheit CD compilation of commercial recordings by Augusta Oltrabella. This CD includes her 1940 recording of Carmela's monologue "E come?! Ma la pare, signora superiora." Mese Mariano received its first performance in Turin in 1937 at the Teatro Carignano (in a double bill with Hänsel und Gretel), and in Venice in 1949 at La Fenice (in a double bill with Le jongleur de Notre-Dame). Its US premiere did not come until 1955, when it was presented at Carnegie Hall in New York. There have been a few late 20th century revivals including those in 1992 at the Teatro del Giglio in Lucca and the Teatro Pergolesi in Jesi and the 1998 performance at the Festival della Valle d'Itria where it was paired with another now-forgotten opera by Giordano, Il re. In addition to Livia Berlendi and Emma Carelli, notable sopranos who have sung the role of Carmela include Clara Petrella, Magda Olivero, Augusta Oltrabella, and Patrizia Ciofi.

== Roles ==
Livia Berlendi, who created the role of Carmela in the 1910 premiere

Roles, voice types, premiere cast
Role	Voice type	Premiere cast, 17 March 1910 Conductor: Leopoldo Mugnone
Carmela	soprano	Livia Berlendi
Madre Superiora	mezzo-soprano	Maria De Loris
Suor Pazienza	mezzo-soprano	Rosa Garavaglia
La Contessa	mezzo-soprano	Vittoria D'Ornelli
Suor Cristina	mezzo-soprano	Maria Slacer
Suor Celeste	soprano	
Suor Maria	soprano	
Suor Agnese	soprano	
Don Fabbiano, the Rector	baritone	Gennaro Curci
Valentina, a child	soprano	
Children, nuns

== Synopsis ==
Time: 19th century
Setting: an orphanage in Naples

It is Easter Sunday and the children are playing and singing as they await the arrival of the Contessa, one of the benefactors of the orphanage. When she arrives, they serenade her as she distributes gifts to them. One of the children, Valentina, then reads a sonnet written in the Contessa's honour by Don Fabbiano. After the Contessa leaves and the children have been led to their rooms, Carmela enters the courtyard bringing a freshly baked Easter cake for her little boy and asks Suor Pazienza if she might see him. Carmela recognizes the nun as her old childhood friend. Overcome with guilt, she tells Suor Pazienza and the Mother Superior how she had been seduced and abandoned as a young girl and left with a son to bring up on her own. She eventually married a worker who refused to have the child of another man in his house and forced her to leave him in the orphanage. Carmela then goes into the chapel to pray. While she is gone some of the nuns arrive to tell the Mother Superior that Carmela's son had died in the night. The Mother Superior decides not to tell her, explaining instead that child cannot see her because he is with the choir practising for the Mary's Month celebrations. Carmela leaves the orphanage in tears.

== Recordings ==
- Umberto Giordano: Il re and Mese mariano – Orchestra Internazionale d'Italia and Coro del Teatro Petruzzelli, conducted by Renato Palumbo. Recorded live at the Festival della Valle d'Itria with Patrizia Ciofi as Carmela. Label: Dynamic CDS-231.
