= Lucia di Lammermoor discography =

Recordings of Donizetti's opera

This is a list of audio and video recordings (discography) of Gaetano Donizetti's 1835 Italian opera Lucia di Lammermoor. Audio and video recordings of Lucie de Lammermoor, a heavily revised French adaptation first performed in 1839, are listed separately.

== Audio recordings in Italian ==
Year	Cast (Lucia, Edgardo, Enrico, Raimondo)	Conductor, Opera house and orchestra	Label
1929	Mercedes Capsir, Enzo de Muro Lomanto, Enrico Molinari, Salvatore Baccaloni	Lorenzo Molajoli, Orchestra and Chorus of La Scala, Milan	Arkadia, Cat: 78035
1939	Lina Pagliughi, Giovanni Malipiero, Giuseppe Manacchini, Luciano Neroni	Ugo Tansini, Orchestra and Chorus of the Italian Broadcasting Authority	Naxos, Cat: 8.110150
1952	Maria Callas, Giuseppe Di Stefano, Piero Campolonghi, Roberto Silva	Guido Picco, Palacio de Bellas Artes, Mexico City; Palacio de Bellas Artes Orchestra and Chorus (Live recording)	Melodram, Cat: 1078712
1953	Dolores Wilson, Gianni Poggi, Anselmo Colzani, Silvio Maionica	Franco Capuana, Orchestra and Chorus of the Opera di Milano	CD: Preiser Records, Cat: 20032
1953	Maria Callas, Giuseppe Di Stefano, Tito Gobbi, Raffaele Arié	Tullio Serafin, Florence Maggio Musicale Orchestra, Florence Maggio Musicale Chorus	EMI Classics, Cat: 62764
1954	Maria Callas, Giuseppe Di Stefano, Rolando Panerai, Giuseppe Modesti	Herbert von Karajan, Orchestra e Coro del Teatro alla Scala di Milano (Live recording)	Standing Room Only, SRO 831-2
1955	Maria Callas, Giuseppe Di Stefano, Rolando Panerai, Nicola Zaccaria	Herbert von Karajan, Milan Teatro alla Scala Chorus, Berlin RIAS Symphony Orchestra (Live recording)	EMI Classics, Cat. No.66441; Melodram, Cat: 26004
1957	Roberta Peters, Jan Peerce, Philip Maero, Giorgio Tozzi	Erich Leinsdorf, Rome Opera House Orchestra and Chorus	LP: RCA Victrola; Cat: VICS-6001; CD: RCA Victor; Cat: 09026-68537-2
1957	Leyla Gencer, Giacinto Prandelli, Nino Carta, Antonio Massaria	Oliviero De Fabritiis, Teatro Lirico Giuseppe Verdi, Trieste, Orchestra and Chorus	Arkadia, Cat:
1959	Maria Callas, Ferruccio Tagliavini, Piero Cappuccilli, Bernard Ładysz	Tullio Serafin, Philharmonia Orchestra, Philharmonia Chorus	EMI Classics, Cat: 56284
1959	Renata Scotto, Giuseppe Di Stefano, Ettore Bastianini, Ivo Vinco	Nino Sanzogno, Teatro alla Scala Orchestra and Chorus	Mercury Living Presence, Cat: SR2-9008
1959	Joan Sutherland, Joao Gibin, John Shaw, Joseph Rouleau	Tullio Serafin, Royal Opera House, Covent Garden, Royal Opera House Orchestra and Chorus	Golden Melodram, Cat:
1961	Joan Sutherland, Renato Cioni, Robert Merrill, Cesare Siepi	John Pritchard, Santa Cecilia Academy Rome Orchestra, Santa Cecilia Academy Rome Chorus	Decca, Cat: 467688
1965	Anna Moffo, Carlo Bergonzi, Mario Sereni, Ezio Flagello	Georges Prêtre, RCA Italiana Opera Chorus and Orchestra	LP: RCA Victor Red Seal; Cat: LSC-6170; CD: RCA Red Seal; Cat: 88875073472
1970	Beverly Sills, Carlo Bergonzi, Piero Cappuccilli, Justino Díaz	Thomas Schippers, London Symphony Orchestra, Ambrosian Opera Chorus	Deutsche Grammophon, Cat: 471250
1971	Joan Sutherland, Luciano Pavarotti, Sherrill Milnes, Nicolai Ghiaurov	Richard Bonynge, Orchestra and Chorus of the Royal Opera House, Covent Garden	Decca, Cat: 4101932
1976	Montserrat Caballé, José Carreras, Vicente Sardinero, Samuel Ramey	Jesús López-Cobos, New Philharmonia Orchestra, Ambrosian Opera Chorus	Philips Classics, Cat: 470421
1983	June Anderson, Alfredo Kraus, Lorenzo Saccomani, Agostino Ferrin	Gianluigi Gelmetti, Teatro Comunale Florence Orchestra and chorus	LS, Cat: 1117
1983	Edita Gruberová, Alfredo Kraus, Renato Bruson, Robert Lloyd	Nicola Rescigno, Royal Philharmonic Orchestra, Ambrosian Opera Chorus	EMI Classics, Cat: 64622
1990	Cheryl Studer, Plácido Domingo, Juan Pons, Samuel Ramey	Ion Marin, London Symphony Orchestra, Ambrosian Opera Chorus	Deutsche Grammophon, Cat: 435309
1997	Andrea Rost, Bruce Ford, Anthony Michaels-Moore, Alastair Miles	Charles Mackerras, Hanover Band, London Voices	Sony, Cat: 63174
2014	Diana Damrau, Joseph Calleja, Ludovic Tézier, Nicolas Testé	Jesus Lopez-Cobos, Bayerische Staatsoper orchestra and chorus	CD:Erato Records; Cat:2564621901

== Video recordings in Italian ==
Year	Cast (Lucia, Edgardo, Enrico, Raimondo)	Conductor, Opera house and orchestra	Label
1967	Renata Scotto, Carlo Bergonzi, Mario Zanasi, Plinio Clabassi	Bruno Bartoletti, NHK Symphony Orchestra (recorded live in September)	DVD: VAI, Cat: 4418
1971	Anna Moffo, Lajos Kozma, Giulio Fioravanti, Paolo Washington	Carlo Felice Cillario, RAI Chorus and Rome Symphony Orchestra	DVD: VAI, Cat: DVD 4211
1982	Joan Sutherland, Alfredo Kraus, Pablo Elvira, Paul Plishka	Richard Bonynge, Metropolitan Opera Orchestra & Chorus (Recorded live, 13 November 1982; Margherita Wallmann, production)	DVD: DGG, Cat: 073 4109; Streaming video: Met Opera on Demand
1986	Joan Sutherland, Richard Greager, Malcolm Donnelly, Clifford Grant	Richard Bonynge, Australian Opera, Elizabethan Sydney Orchestra and Australian Opera Chorus	DVD: Image Entertainment, Cat: 5789RA
1992	Mariella Devia, Vincenzo La Scola, Renato Bruson, Carlo Colombara	Stefano Ranzani, La Scala, Milan, Teatro alla Scala Orchestra and Chorus	DVD: Opus Arte, Cat: OA 3001
2006	Desirée Rancatore, Roberto De Biasio, Luca Grassi, Enrico Giuseppe Iori	Antonino Fogliani, Teatro Donizetti, Orchestra and Chorus Bergamo Musica Festival "G.Donizetti"	DVD: Dynamic, Cat: 33535
2009	Anna Netrebko, Piotr Beczała, Mariusz Kwiecien, Ildar Abdrazakov	Marco Armiliato, Metropolitan Opera Orchestra & Chorus (Recorded live, 7 February 2009; Mary Zimmerman, production)	HD video: Met Opera on Demand
2011	Natalie Dessay, Joseph Calleja, Ludovic Tézier, Kwangchul Youn	Patrick Summers, Metropolitan Opera Orchestra & Chorus (Recorded live, 19 March 2011; Mary Zimmerman, production)	HD video: Met Opera on Demand
2016	Diana Damrau, Charles Castronovo, Ludovic Tézier, Kwangchul Youn	Daniel Oren, The Royal Opera Orchestra & Chorus (Recorded live, 25 April 2016; Katie Mitchell, stage director)	DVD:Erato Records; Cat:9029579205; RBO Stream
2018	Lisette Oropesa, Javier Camarena, Artur Ruciński, Roberto Tagliavini	Daniel Oren, Chorus & Orchestra of the Teatro Real, Madrid (Recorded live, David Alden, stage director)	Full HD: Teatro Real, Televisión Española
2021	Irina Lungu, Piotr Beczała, Massimo Cavalletti, Oleg Tsibulko	Speranza Scappucci, Zurich Opera Orchestra & Chorus (Recorded live, June 2021; Tatjana Gürbaca, stage director)	Full HD: Accentus Music
2022	Nadine Sierra, Javier Camarena, Artur Ruciński, Christian Van Horn	Riccardo Frizza, Metropolitan Opera Orchestra & Chorus (Recorded live, 21 May 2022; Simon Stone, production)	HD video: Met Opera on Demand
2023	Lisette Oropesa, Juan Diego Flórez, Boris Pinkhasovich, Michele Pertusi	Riccardo Chailly, La Scala Orchestra & Chorus (Recorded live, April 2023; Yannis Kokkos, stage director & designer)	Blu-ray: C Major

== Audio recordings of Lucie de Lammermoor (in French) ==
Year	Cast (Lucia, Edgardo, Enrico, Raimondo)	Conductor, Opera house and orchestra	Label
1997	Patrizia Ciofi, Alexandru Badea, Nicolas Rivenq, Jae-Jun Lee	Maurizio Benini, Orchestra Internazionale d'Italia & Bratislawa Chamber Choir	Dynamic, Cat: CDS204/1-2
2002	Natalie Dessay, Marcelo Álvarez, Ludovic Tézier, Nicolas Cavallier	Evelino Pidò, Orchestre et Chœur de l'Opéra National de Lyon	Celestial Audio, Cat: CA 341
2002	Natalie Dessay, Roberto Alagna, Ludovic Tézier, Nicolas Cavallier	Evelino Pidò, Orchestre et Chœur de l'Opéra National de Lyon	EMI Classics, Cat: 4354552823

== Video recordings of Lucie de Lammermoor (in French) ==
Year	Cast (Lucia, Edgardo, Enrico, Raimondo)	Conductor, Opera house and orchestra	Label
2002	Patrizia Ciofi, Roberto Alagna, Ludovic Tézier, Nicolas Cavallier	Evelino Pidò, Orchestre et Chœur de l'Opéra National de Lyon	DVD Video: TDK, Cat: DVWW OPLDLM
