= Regina Diaz =

- Opera by Umberto Giordano
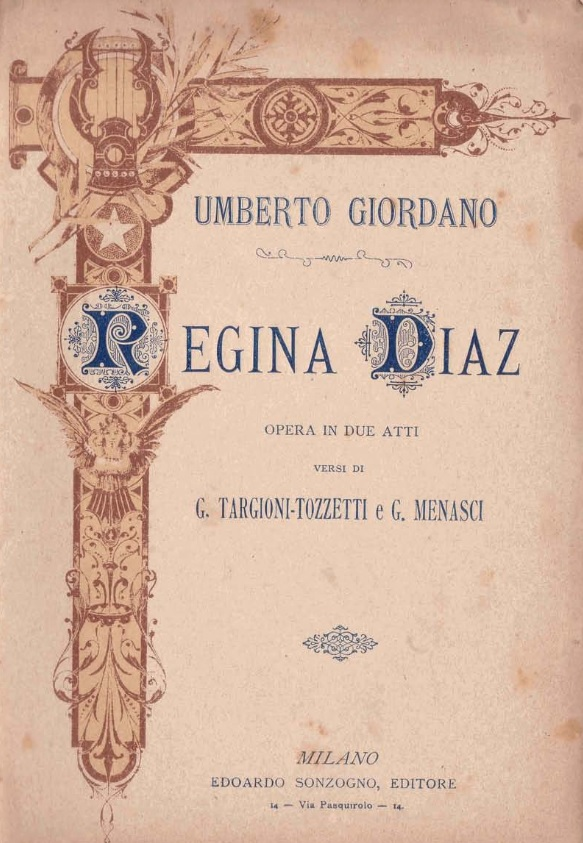
- Original libretto cover
- Librettist: Giovanni Targioni-Tozzetti; Guido Menasci
- Language: Italian
- Premiere: 5 March 1894; Teatro Mercadante, Naples

Regina Diaz is an opera in two acts composed by Umberto Giordano to a libretto by Giovanni Targioni-Tozzetti and Guido Menasci. It premiered on 5 March 1894 at the Teatro Mercadante in Naples. The libretto is based on Lockroy's and Edmond Badon's Un duel sous le cardinal de Richelieu, which was also the source of Donizetti's 1843 opera Maria di Rohan, although the setting for Giordano's version was moved from 17th-century Paris to 18th-century Naples. The opera was a failure at its premiere and withdrawn after the second performance. Giordano's patron and publisher, Edoardo Sonzogno, blamed the failure on the poor libretto. Giordano blamed it on Sonzogno's interference in the production.

== Background and performance history ==
Regina Diaz was Giordano's second full-length opera and like its predecessor, Mala vita, was commissioned by the Milanese music publisher Edoardo Sonzogno. Mala vita had had considerable success apart from its performances in Naples where the gritty verismo story and depiction of Neapolitan slum-dwellers had caused a furor amongst the critics and audience alike. For his second opera, Sonzogno commissioned Giovanni Targioni-Tozzetti and Guido Menasci (the librettists of Mascagni's hugely successful Cavalleria rusticana) to write a libretto for Giordano. Sonzogno was candid with the librettists concerning the problems they might face with the composer. He wrote to Menasci in 1892:

His lack of culture prevents him from framing a clear idea of what he feels, what he wants, and what is more or less readily adaptable to a libretto. Patience is needed since he has other gifts and qualities as a musician.

Giordano decided to turn away from verismo but was determined to keep a connection with Naples. The result was an old-fashioned romantic melodrama based on the same story used in Donizetti's Maria di Rohan but with the setting changed from 17th-century Paris to Naples in the early 18th century when it was under Spanish rule. Regina Diaz premiered on 5 March 1894 at the Teatro Mercadante in Naples with the Spanish-born soprano Concepció "Concetta" Bordalba in the title role. The premiere was a failure with both the audience and the critics, of whom only Roberto Bracco mounted a robust defense of the work. Rocco Pagliara, the critic for Il Mattino wrote:

He has composed a romantic melodrama...but by plunging himself into utter conventionality...he has been unable to achieve anything that would even polish or illuminate the stale and the conventional.

After the second performance, Sonzogno withdrew the opera and cancelled the stipend he had been paying to Giordano for future work.

With the loss of Sonzogno's support, Giordano seriously considered giving up on a career as an opera composer and was supporting himself by working as a bandmaster and fencing instructor. However, Mascagni and Alberto Franchetti persuaded Sonzogno to give Giordano a final chance. Franchetti offered Giordano Illica's libretto for Andrea Chénier, which Franchetti had originally commissioned. Giordano incorporated some of the best parts of the score for Regina Diaz into Andrea Chénier which had a triumphant premiere at La Scala in 1896. It proved to be Giordano's most enduring success and secured his future as an opera composer.

== Roles ==
Roles, voice types, premiere cast
Role	Voice type	Premiere cast, 5 March 1894 Conductor: Rodolfo Ferrari
Ferrante Diaz, the Spanish governor of Naples	baritone	Carlo Buti
Regina Diaz, Ferrante's wife	soprano	Concetta Bordalba
Mario Sanseverino, a Neapolitan nobleman and Regina's lover	tenor	Giovanni Apostolu
Fra Benedetto, a friar	bass	Lodovico Contini
Gonzalo, a soldier in the service of Ferrante Diaz	tenor	?
Men and women of Naples, noblemen, friars, soldiers

== Synopsis ==
Setting: Naples c. 1700

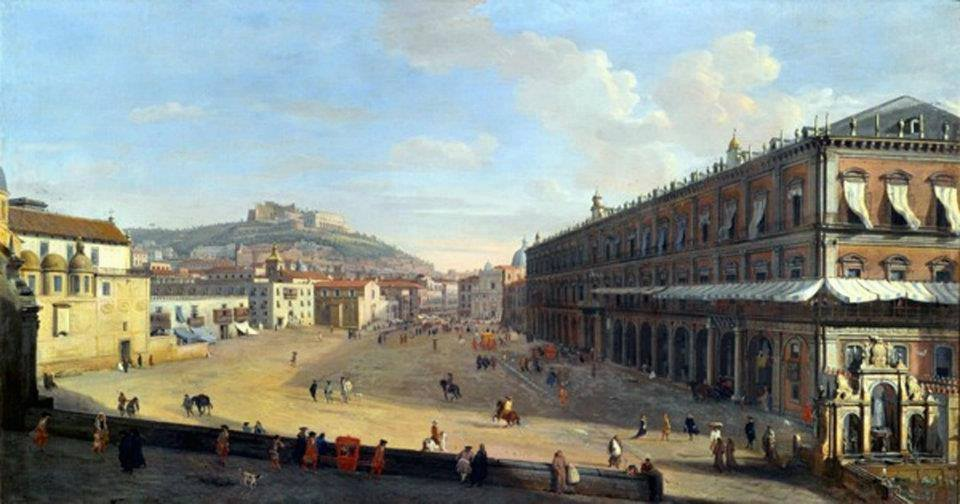
Naples c. 1700 by Caspar van Wittel

Act 1

Mario Sanseverino, a Neapolitan nobleman and leader of a rebellion against Spanish rule, approaches the friar Benedetto in the courtyard of a monastery. He tells Benedetto of the impending rebellion and hands him a sheaf of papers for safekeeping, asking him to destroy them if he is killed. The papers are letters from Sanseverino's lover, Regina, the wife of the Spanish governor Ferrante Diaz. Sanseverino and Regina meet in a church where she has gone to pray. They once again declare their love for each other. Later, the plot is discovered and its leaders, including Sanseverino, are brought to the governor's palace. Ferrante recognizes Sanseverino as the son of an old friend. He tells Sanseverino that he remembers him as a boy and will arrange for him to escape into exile instead of being executed. Regina is distraught at the idea that she will never see her lover again.

Act 2

Left alone together in the governors' palace, Sanseverino and Regina make plans to flee together at midnight. Meanwhile, Gonzalo, one of Ferrante's soldiers, arrives to inform Ferrante that in investigating the plot, he has discovered that it also involves Fra Benedetto who appears to be in possession of secret papers. Ferrante summons Benedetto and demands to see the papers whereupon he discovers that Regina has betrayed him with Sanseverino. In a fury, he attempts to kill Regina, but is stopped by Benedetto. Sanseverino arrives. Ferrante immediately challenges him to a duel and kills him. Regina is sent off to a convent where she will spend the rest of her days.
