= Il re =

Single Act Opera by Umberto Giordano

- Opera by Umberto Giordano
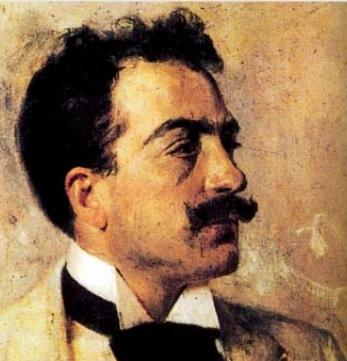
- The opera's composer, Umberto Giordano
- Librettist: Giovacchino Forzano
- Premiere: 12 January 1929; La Scala, Milan

Il re (The king) is a novella or opera in one act and three scenes by composer Umberto Giordano to an Italian libretto by Giovacchino Forzano. The opera premiered at La Scala in Milan on 12 January 1929.

The opera is a short comedy, only lasting about 1 hour in performance, about a young woman, Rosalina, betrothed to Colombello. One day she sees the King in all his majesty and falls in love with him, breaking the engagement with Colombello. But after meeting the king privately in his chamber, and seeing him with no crown or clothes, she loses her interest in him and returns to Colombello.

== Performance history ==
Unusual for a 20th-century opera, Il re was written specifically as a vehicle for Toti Dal Monte, a coloratura soprano of the old school. Dal Monte performed the work a number of times during her career but after her retirement, the opera quickly fell into obscurity. In December 1949, Arturo Toscanini, who had conducted the world premiere of the opera, featured the short "Dance of the Moor" on a broadcast concert with the NBC Symphony Orchestra.

== Roles ==
| Role | Voice type | Premiere Cast, 12 January 1929 (Conductor: Arturo Toscanini) |
|---|---|---|
| Rosalina | soprano | Toti Dal Monte* |
| Colombello | tenor | Enzo de Muro Lomanto |
| The King | baritone | Jean-Armand-Charles Crabbé |
| The Miller | bass | Tancredi Pasero |
| The Miller's Wife | mezzo-soprano | Angelica Cravcenco |
| The Priest | tenor | Giuseppe Nessi |
| The Lawyer | bass | Salvatore Baccaloni |
| The Astrologer | mezzo-soprano | Lucia Abbrescia |
| Voice of the Auctioneer/Butler | baritone | Aristide Baracchi |
| First Cerimoniere | tenor | Giovanni Azzimonti |
| Second Cerimoniere | tenor | Palmiro Domenichetti |

* Dal Monte alternated performances of the role of Rosalina with Mercedes Capsir during the original 1929 production.

== Recordings ==
- Umberto Giordano: Il re and Mese mariano - Orchestra Internazionale d'Italia and Coro del Teatro Petruzzelli, conducted by Renato Palumbo. Recorded live at the Festival della Valle d'Itria with Patrizia Ciofi as Carmela in Mese mariano. Label: Dynamic CDS-231.
