= Zanetto =

Opera by Pietro Mascagni

- Opera by Pietro Mascagni
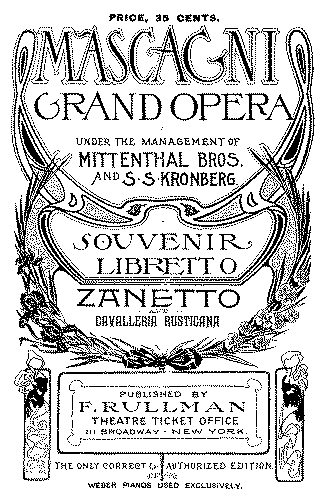
- Cover of the souvenir libretto printed for the first New York performance 1902
- Librettist: Giovanni Targioni-Tozzetti; Guido Menasci
- Language: Italian
- Based on: Emilio Praga's translation of Le Passant (1869) by François Coppée
- Premiere: 2 March 1896; Liceo Musicale Rossini, Pesaro

Zanetto is an opera in one act by Pietro Mascagni to an Italian libretto by Giovanni Targioni-Tozzetti and Guido Menasci. It received its first performance on 2 March 1896 at the Liceo Musicale Rossini in Pesaro. Only 40 minutes long and with cast of two singers, Zanetto was originally described by its composer as a scena lirica (lyric scene) rather than an opera. It is set in the countryside near Florence during the Renaissance and tells the story of an encounter between a beautiful courtesan, Silvia, and a young wandering minstrel, Zanetto. The libretto was adapted from an Italian translation by Emilio Praga of François Coppée's play Le passant (The passer-by) in which the young Sarah Bernhardt had won fame in the en travesti role of Zanetto.

== Background and performance history ==
Zanetto represented a return by Mascagni to the one-act format of his first opera Cavalleria rusticana, which had premiered in 1890. The Renaissance setting of Zanetto was notably different from the gritty contemporary story he used for Cavalleria rusticana, the work that made him famous. By 1893, Mascagni was simultaneously working on three operas: Vistilia, based on a novel by Rocco de Zerbi set in ancient Rome; Guglielmo Ratcliff, which he had first started composing in 1882; and Zanetto, which his publisher, Edoardo Sonzogno, envisioned being performed in future double bills with Cavalleria. Mascagni finally finished Zanetto in October 1895. It was premiered on 2 March 1896 as part of the annual celebrations in honour of Rossini's birthday at the Liceo Musicale Rossini in Pesaro, where Mascagni was now the director. Two of the conservatory's students, Maria Pizzagalli and Stefania Collamarini, sang the roles of Silvia and Zanetto. The opera was then staged at La Scala on 18 March with the same cast. Although the opera had been enthusiastically received in Pesaro, the reception at La Scala was lukewarm. Edoardo Pompei, a music critic and early biographer of Mascagni, ascribed this to the slightness of the work which was magnified in large theatre such as La Scala accustomed to grandiose productions:

It would be as if one presented a miniature from a fourth-floor window and then expected the public to appreciate it from the street.

Despite its reception at La Scala, the work was performed throughout Italy in smaller theatres during the year following its premiere. It was also performed in a private performance in London by the Ravogli sisters, Sofia and Giulia in 1896. Zanetto had its US premiere on 8 October 1902 at the old Metropolitan Opera House conducted by Mascagni with Elena Bianchini-Cappelli as Silvia and Eugenia Mantelli as Zanetto. As at La Scala, the reception was mixed. The New York Times critic pronounced the music as "sonorous, mellifluous, and melodious" and praised the performances of Bianchini-Cappelli and Mantelli, but concluded that "outside of Italy, Zanetto can never become more than a mild curtain-raiser".

Premieres in other major Italian opera houses came rather sporadically: 1905 at the Teatro Costanzi in Rome, 1913 at La Fenice in Venice, 1920 at the Teatro Regio in Turin, and 1940 at the Teatro Comunale in Florence. More recently, the opera was performed at the New Jersey State Opera in 1988, the Teatro Comunale in Florence in 1996 (with Sonia Ganassi as Zanetto), the Teatro Astor in Savona in 2003, the Teatro Goldoni in Livorno in 2007, and New York's Carnegie Hall in 2007 (in a concert performance with Jennifer Larmore as Zanetto). A new production was staged during the summer of 2012 at Opera Holland Park in London, when it was paired with Gianni Schicchi by Puccini.

The setting of the 2003 performance in Savona (preserved on DVD) was updated to the 20th century, with an ending that deviated considerably from the original libretto. In the original after renouncing her love for young Zanetto and sending him away, Sylvia weeps alone as she watches him disappear in the distance. However, the Savona director, Beppe De Tomasi, had Sylvia pull out a pistol and shoot herself instead. A brief section of the final music in the scene had to be played twice to accompany the extra stage-business involved in Sylvia's suicide.

Odyssey Opera presented a staged production in the summer of 2013. In 2016, they released their first commercial disc under their own recording label sung by the same cast.

== Roles ==
Roles, voice types, premiere cast
Role	Voice type	Premiere cast, 2 March 1896 Conductor: Pietro Mascagni
Silvia, a courtesan	soprano	Maria Pizzagalli
Zanetto, a young poet and minstrel	contralto (en travesti)	Stefania Collamarini

== Synopsis ==
Setting: the Tuscan countryside during the Renaissance

The following synopsis was published in the souvenir libretto printed for the New York premiere of Zanetto in 1902:

Silvia is the rich and beautiful hostess of a country hotel, who has been besieged by lovers of almost every description, she repulses them all, because although they may be well-to-do and even wealthy and powerful, they have not pleased her fancy or awakened her heart. At last she forswears love entirely, being convinced that her destiny is to remain single.

Still, she remembers a youth she once saw, and believes that he lives near by, in Florence, toward which city she idly looks out in the summer evening from the veranda of her hotel, placed on the side of a steep mountain.

As she looks she hears the voice of a roving minstrel who is approaching. She conceals herself. He comes near, and not venturing to enter the hotel, lies down to sleep on a bench. He is soon asleep; and Silvia comes near to see him. She recognizes in him her ideal; and at once loves him. She wakes him up, and he sees in her the madonna of his dreams.

He is fond of his freedom, and of his own way of living; but thinks it would be nice to have a home, and a sister. This does not suit Silvia; who then conceals her identity; and says that she is a widow, and very poor; and cannot possibly entertain a wandering poet. After several refusals, he tells her that he has heard of Silvia, who is also beautiful, as well as rich, and liberal. He asks his newly-beloved to help him find her. She advises him not to go, that she would do anything to save him from his danger. Although both love each other she is unwilling to let herself be known. He believes in her sincerity; and offers to go in any direction she may point out. She points toward the dawn; he dashes toward it; she watches him till out of sight; then burying her face in her hands exclaims:

"Blessed art thou, O Love! Now can I weep again!"

== Recordings ==
- 1969 – Tito Petralia (conductor), Orchestra Sinfonica della RAI – Giuseppina Arista (Zanetto), Pia Malagrini (Silvia) – Live recording, Milan, 26 June 1969. Label: originally released on LP by MRF LP; reissued on CD by Nuova Era
- 1986 – Mauro Ceccanti (conductor), Orchestra e Coro del Comitato Estate Livornese – Ambra Vespasiani (Zanetto), Rita Lantieri (Silvia) – Live recording, Livorno, Teatro di Villa Mimbelli, 30 July 1986. Label: Bongiovanni CD
- 2003 – Bruno Aprea (conductor), Orchestra Sinfonica di Savona – Romina Basso (Zanetto), Denia Mazzola Gavazzeni (Silvia) – Live recording, November 2003, Teatro Astor, Savona. Label: Kicco Classic DVD
- 2007 – Peter Tiboris (conductor), Bohuslav Martinu Philharmonic – Jennifer Larmore ( Zanetto), Eilana Lappalainen (Silvia) – Studio recording, 2007. Label: Elysium Records CD
- 2018 – Gil Rose (conductor), Odyssey Opera, Boston – Eve Gigliotti (Zanetto) Eleni Calenos (Silvia) – Studio recording, 2014
