= Patrizia Ciofi =

Italian opera singer (born 1967)

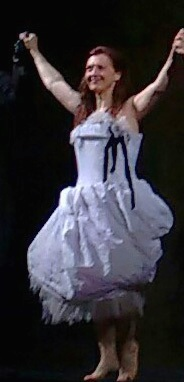
- Ciofi taking curtain call in a performance of I Capuleti e i Montecchi in Barcelona, May 2016
- Born: 7 June 1967 (age 59); Casole d'Elsa, Tuscany, Italy
- Occupation: Operatic soprano
- Years active: 1989–present

Patrizia Ciofi (born 7 June 1967) is an Italian operatic coloratura soprano.

== Career ==
Born in Casole d'Elsa, Ciofi studied at the Istituto Musicale Pietro Mascagni in Livorno. She subsequently took part in master classes at the Accademia Musicale Chigiana, Siena, with Carlo Bergonzi and Shirley Verrett. She made her debut in Gino Negri's Giovanni Sebastiano at the Teatro Comunale, Florence in 1989. She began her collaboration with the Festival della Valle d'Itria, featuring in La sonnambula (1994), Cherubini's Médée (1995), Piccinni's L'americano (1996), French version of Lucia di Lammermoor (1997), Giordano's Mese mariano and Il re (1998), Traetta's Ippolito ed Aricia (1999), Rossini's Otello and Meyerbeer's Robert le diable (2000).

She made her La Scala debut in 1997 with La traviata, conducted by Riccardo Muti, and returned for L'elisir d'amore in 1998 and 2001. She has sung in most of the major Italian opera houses as well as the Rossini Opera Festival in Pesaro.

She has also sung in Paris, at the Châtelet, the Paris Opera and the Théâtre des Champs-Elysées, in Lyon and Marseille, also sung at the Gran Teatre del Liceu in Barcelona. She made her Covent Garden debut in 2002 with Rigoletto, her Chicago debut in 2003 with La traviata and Wiener Staatsoper debut in 2008 with La sonnambula.

Her major roles on stage include Amina in Vincenzo Bellini's La sonnambula, Violetta in Giuseppe Verdi's La traviata, Gilda in Rigoletto, Susanna in Mozart's Le nozze di Figaro, and Lucia in Gaetano Donizetti's Lucia di Lammermoor (in both the standard Italian version and the French version Lucie de Lammermoor of 1839).

Ciofi has also made a number of recordings, including the Le nozze di Figaro, conducted by René Jacobs, which won the 2005 Grammy Award for Best Opera Recording. Another example is the recording of Giacomo Meyerbeer's Opera Il crociato in Egitto together with the Male Soprano Michael Maniaci at La Fenice in Venice.

In December 2012, she was brought in at very short notice to sing Isabelle in the revival of Giacomo Meyerbeer's Robert le diable at the Royal Opera House, London, replacing Jennifer Rowley.

== Partial discography ==
- La sonnambula by Vincenzo Bellini (1995) Nuova Era
- Médée by Luigi Cherubini (1996, re-issued 2008) Nuova Era (role of Dircé)
- L'americano by Niccolò Piccinni (1996) Dynamic
- Lucie de Lammermoor by Gaetano Donizetti (1998) Dynamic
- Il Rè & Mese Mariano by Umberto Giordano (1999) Dynamic
- Ippolito ed Aricia by Tommaso Traetta (2000) Dynamic
- Die Entführung aus dem Serail by Wolfgang Amadeus Mozart (2003) TDK DVD
- Benvenuto Cellini by Hector Berlioz (2004) Virgin Classics
- Amor e gelosia (with Joyce DiDonato) compilation of operatic duets by George Frederic Handel (2004) CD Virgin Classics
- Lucie de Lammermoor by Gaetano Donizetti (2002) TDK DVD
- Le nozze di Figaro by Wolfgang Amadeus Mozart (2004) Harmonia Mundi
- Bajazet by Antonio Vivaldi (2005) Virgin Classics
- Radamisto by Handel (2005) Virgin Classics
- Pia de' Tolomei by Gaetano Donizetti (2005) - Video Live recording on DVD - Dynamic
- Chérubin by Jules Massenet (2006) - Video Live recording on DVD - Dynamic
- Il crociato in Egitto by Giacomo Meyerbeer (2007) - Video Live recording on DVD - Dynamic
- Robert le Diable by Giacomo Meyerbeer (2012) - Live recording - Brilliant Classics
- Dinorah by Giacomo Meyerbeer (2014) – Live recording from a concert performance – cpo
- Motets (with Fabio Biondi & Europa Galante) by Antonio Vivaldi (2004) CD Virgin Classics

== Repertoire ==
- Giuseppe Verdi
  - Falstaff (Nannetta)
  - Rigoletto (Gilda)
  - La traviata (Violetta)
- Giacomo Puccini
  - Gianni Schicchi (Lauretta)
- Vincenzo Bellini
  - I Capuleti e i Montecchi (Giulietta)
  - La sonnambula (Amina)
  - La straniera (Alaide)
- Gaetano Donizetti
  - Don Pasquale (Norina)
  - L'elisir d'amore (Adina)
  - La fille du régiment (Marie)
  - Lucia di Lammermoor (Lucia)
  - Maria Stuarda (Maria)
  - Pia de' Tolomei (Pia)
- Gioachino Rossini
  - Adelaide di Borgogna (Adelaide)
  - Otello (Desdemona)
  - Tancredi (Amenaide)
  - Il turco in Italia (Fiorilla)
  - Il viaggio a Reims (Corinna)
- Wolfgang Amadeus Mozart
  - Così fan tutte (Fiordiligi)
  - Le nozze di Figaro (Contessa)
  - Die Entführung aus dem Serail (Blonde)
  - Mitridate, Re di Ponto (Aspasia)
- Georges Bizet
  - Les pêcheurs de perles (Leila)
- Antonio Vivaldi
  - Bajazet (Idaspe)
- Georg Friedrich Händel
  - Alcina (Alcina)
  - Giulio Cesare (Cleopatra)
- Jules Massenet
  - Cendrillon (Cendrillon)
  - Manon (Manon)
- Umberto Giordano
  - Mese mariano (Carmela)
  - Il re (Rosalina)
- Giacomo Meyerbeer
  - Il crociato in Egitto (Palmide)
  - Robert le diable (Isabelle)
- Tommaso Traetta
  - Ippolito ed Aricia (Aricia)
- Luigi Cherubini
  - Médée (Dircé)
- Niccolò Piccinni
  - L'americano (Silvia)
