= I Rantzau =

Opera by Pietro Mascagni

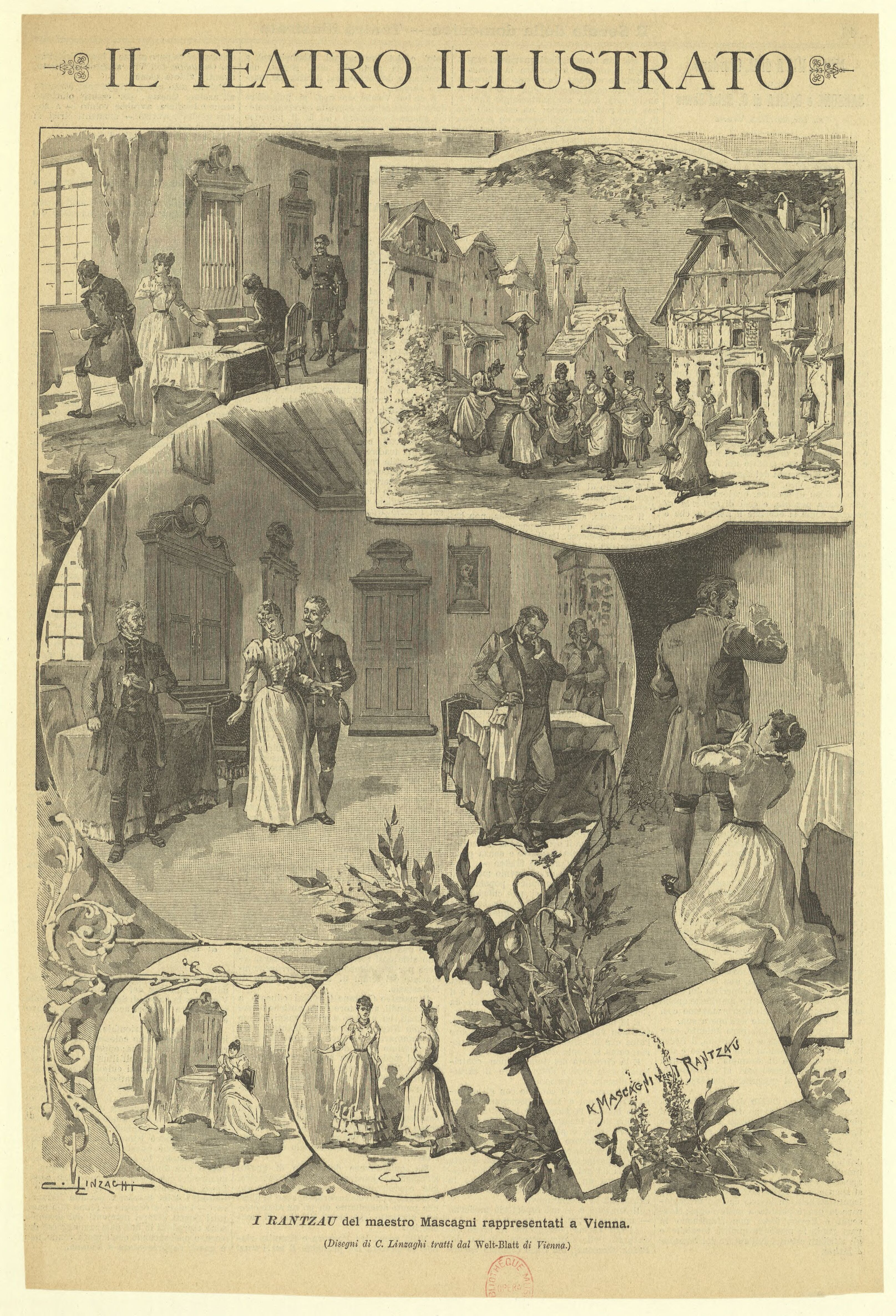
Scenes from the opera depicted in Il Teatro Illustrato', 1892

I Rantzau (The Rantzau Family) is an opera in four acts by Pietro Mascagni (1892), based on a libretto by Guido Menasci and Giovanni Targioni-Tozzetti, based on the play Les Rantzau (1873) by French writers Erckmann and Chatrian, after their novel (1882) Les Deux Frères (The Two Brothers). It was first performed at the Teatro della Pergola in Florence, Italy on 10 November 1892.

The overture is popular and was recorded in Berlin with Mascagni conducting in 1927. The soprano solo in Act 1 is an excellent example of true verismo aria, and has an emotional impact that parallels the composer's work in Cavalleria rusticana. The soprano/tenor duet is impressive enough (and has been recorded in modern times by Plácido Domingo and Renato Scotto), but the opera is perhaps the least revived of Mascagni's "other" operas, with only one recording made of the full opera. (One reason for the opera's unpopularity may lie in the central plot point that the two lovers are first cousins who marry in the end.)

== Roles ==
| Role | Voice type | Premiere cast, 10 November 1892 (Conductor: Rodolfo Ferrari ) |
|---|---|---|
| Gianni Rantzau | baritone | Mattia Battistini |
| Giorgio | tenor | Fernando De Lucia |
| Luisa | soprano | Hariclea Darclée |
| Giacomo Rantzau | bass | Luigi Broglio |
| Fiorenzo | baritone | Edoardo Sottolana |
| Giulia | mezzo-soprano | Stefania Collamarini |
| Lebel | tenor | Giovanni Paroli |
