= Avelina Carrera =

Spanish operatic soprano (1871–1939)

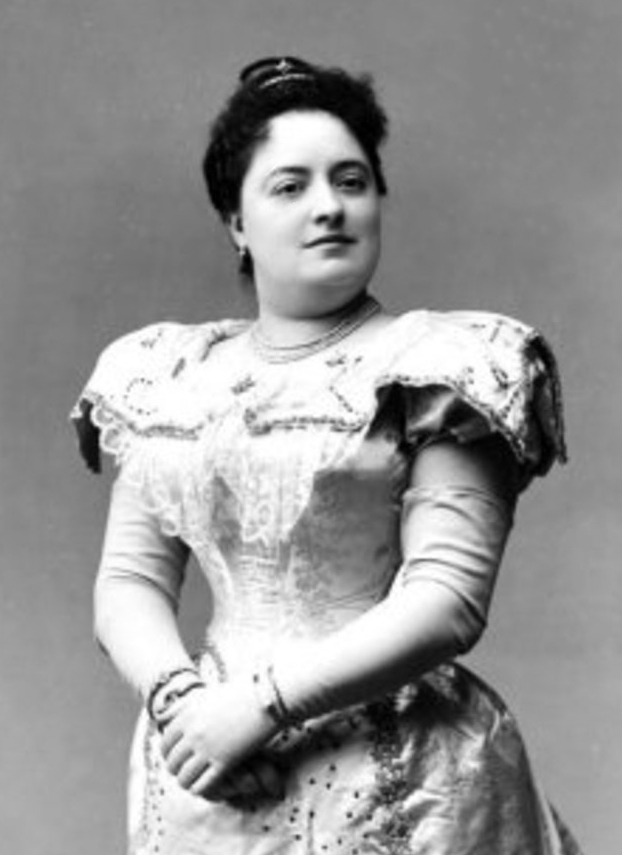
- Born: Andrea Avelina Carrera y Terris; 2 January 1871; Barcelona, Spain
- Died: 25 February 1939 (aged 68); Rubí, Barcelona, Spain
- Occupations: Operatic soprano; voice teacher
- Organizations: Liceu

Andrea Avelina Carrera (2 January 1871 – 25 February 1939) was a Spanish operatic soprano who frequently performed at the Gran Teatro del Liceo in Barcelona. It was there she made her debut in 1889 as Elsa in Richard Wagner's Lohengrin as a substitute, receiving enthusiastic reviews. In the 1890s, she toured Spain but also appeared in Italy and Portugal, while in the early 1900s she performed in Latin America. In March 1896, at Milan's La Scala she appeared in the world premiere of Umberto Giordano's Andrea Chénier, creating the role of Maddalena. On retiring in 1910, she trained students in Barcelona.

== Early life and education ==
Born on 2 January 1871 in Barcelona, Andrea Avellina Carrera y Terris studied first under Esteban Puig and the tenor G. Tintorer but then went on to spend three years as a pupil of the composer and conductor Juan Goula. When she was only 16, Goula arranged for her to sing in concerts.

== Career ==
In November 1889 at the Liceu in Barcelona, Goula managed to have Carrera, now 18, stand in for an indisposed Medea Borelli in the role of Elsa in Wagner's Lohengrin. Her professional performance was such a huge success for a debutante that not only did she receive enthusiastic reports from the critics but the audience even suggested she should continue to replace Borelli. Other successes in Barcelona included Margherita in Gounod's Faust in April 1890 and in May, Catherine in the Spanish premiere of Bizet's La jolie fille de Perth for which she received not only an ovation but was inundated with flowers, fans and other gifts.

In 1893, Carrera sang in Naples' Teatro di San Carlo, first appearing once more in the role of Elsa, then on 1 April as Zelica in the world premiere of Daniele Napoletano's Il profeta velato del Korosan. At the end of the year, at the Teatro de São Carlos in Lisbon, she appeared as Brünnhilde in Wagner's Die Walküre, remaining in early 1894 to perform the title role in Verdi's Aida, Rachel in Halévy's La Juive and Alice Ford in Verdi's Falstaff.

In March 1896, at Milan's La Scala she created the role of Maddalena in the world premiere of Giordano's Andrea Chénier, alongside Giuseppe Borgatti in the title role, remaining for a total of 11 performances. Back in Barcelona, at the Liceu in 1898 she appeared in Verdi's Otello and created the role of Criseide in Rubinstein's Néron. In February 1900, she appeared first in Turin with 11 performances of Lohengrin and then in Argentina where from May to August at the Teatro de la Ópera in Buenos Aires she appeared in Verdi's Aida, in Andrea Chénier, in Gounod's La reine de Saba and in the local premiere of Alberto Franchetti's Cristoforo Colombo. She also appeared that year as a guest performer in Havana and Mexico City and in 1901 in Cairo. She created the title role of Bruniselda by the Catalan composer Enric Morera in 1904. In 1907 and 1908 she took part in a series of recording sessions in Milan for Fonotipia. From 1909, she trained students in Barcelona including the coloratura soprano Margarita Salvi.

Avelina Carrera died in Rubí near Barcelona on 25 February 1939, aged 68.
