= Enzo de Muro Lomanto =

Italian operatic tenor

Enzo de Muro Lomanto (photo with 1943 dedication)

Enzo de Muro Lomanto (11 April 1902 – 15 February 1952) was an Italian operatic lyric tenor.

== Biography ==
Born Vincenzo De Muro in Canosa di Puglia, he studied in Naples, and added his mother's maiden name "Lomanto" to his name to avoid confusion with another tenor, Bernardo de Muro. He made his debut at Catanzaro, as Alfredo in La traviata in 1925. Shortly afterwards, he appeared at the San Carlo in Naples, as Cavaradossi in Tosca. He made his La Scala debut in 1928 as Tonio in La fille du régiment. He would sing there until 1943. He also appeared at the Paris Opéra in 1936, as Duca di Mantua in Rigoletto, and at the Maggio Musicale Fiorentino in Florence, in The Tales of Hoffmann, in 1938. He also took part in the creation of Giordano's Il re, at La Scala, in 1929. De Muro Lomanto made a number of records and can be heard in the first complete recording of Lucia di Lammermoor, opposite Mercedes Capsir.

Attended by Hina Spani, Vera de Cristoff, Luigi Rossi Morelli, Browning Mummery, and a crowd of 25,000 fans, he married the lyric soprano Toti Dal Monte in St Mary's Cathedral, Sydney, Australia, during a 1928 tour.

He died in 1952, aged 49, in Naples.
