= Toti Dal Monte =

Italian singer (1893–1975)

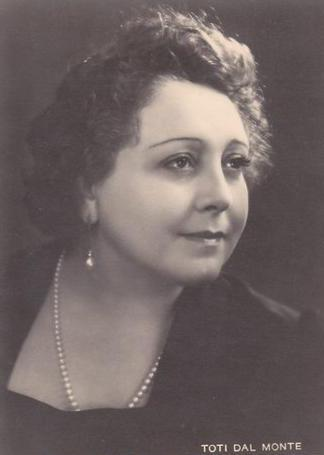
Toti Dal Monte

Antonietta Meneghel (27 June 1893 – 26 January 1975), better known by her stage name Toti Dal Monte, was a celebrated Italian operatic lyric soprano. She may be best remembered today for her performance as Cio-cio-san in Puccini's Madama Butterfly, having recorded this role complete in 1939 with Beniamino Gigli as Pinkerton.

== Career ==
Born in Mogliano Veneto, in the Province of Treviso, Dal Monte studied singing at the Naples Conservatory under Barbara Marchisio. She made her debut at La Scala at the age of 23 as Biancofiore in Zandonai's Francesca da Rimini. She was an immediate success, and her clear "nightingale-like" voice came to be highly appreciated throughout the world. Her best-known roles included the bel canto parts of Amina (in Bellini's La sonnambula), Lucia (in Donizetti's Lucia di Lammermoor) and Gilda (in Verdi's Rigoletto). In 1922 she performed several parts opposite the tenor Carlo Broccardi at the Teatro Massimo in Palermo; including Cio-cio-san, Gilda, and the title heroine in Alfredo Catalani's La Wally.

In 1924, fresh from triumphs in Milan and Paris, but before her debut in London or New York, she was engaged by Dame Nellie Melba to be one of the star singers of an Italian opera company that Melba was organising to make a tour of Australia. She proved a popular and critical success on the tour, and there was no rivalry between the ageing Melba and the much younger Dal Monte. Rather, they threw bouquets after each other's performances. On 23 August 1928, on her third visit to Australia, she married tenor Enzo de Muro Lomanto in St Mary's Cathedral, Sydney.

On 12 January 1929 at La Scala she created the role of Rosalina, in the world premiere of Umberto Giordano's Il re.

She retired from the operatic stage in 1945. However, she continued to work in the theatre (as well as to make the occasional recording) and appeared in a number of films, of which the best known is perhaps her last, Enrico Maria Salerno's Anonimo veneziano, a 1970 story about a musician at La Fenice. She became a singing teacher and coach; her pupils included Dodi Protero, Dolores Wilson, Maaria Eira and Gianna D'Angelo.

== Death ==
Dal Monte died in 1975 at the age of 81, in Pieve di Soligo, as a result of circulatory disorders.

== Sources ==
- Toti del Monte at operaitaliana.com.
- Toti Dal Monte at IMDb
- "Remembering Toti" at thewaythefutureblogs.com

== Bibliography ==
- The Last Prima Donnas, by Lanfranco Rasponi, Alfred A Knopf, 1982; ISBN 0-394-52153-6
