= Yannis Apostolou =

Greek opera singer (died 1905)

- Ιωάννης Αποστόλου
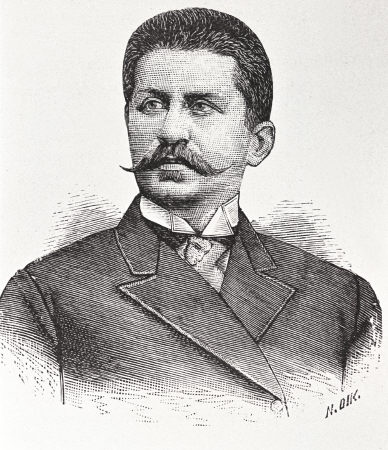
- Born: c.1860 Athens or Acharnes, Kingdom of Greece
- Died: 28 August 1905; Naples, Kingdom of Italy
- Other names: Giovanni Apostolu
- Occupation: opera singer (tenor)

Yannis Apostolou (c.1860 – 28 August 1905) was a Greek opera singer who went on to become one of the leading tenors in Italian opera houses, performing under the name Giovanni Apostolu. His voice is preserved on some early G&T recordings made in Milan in 1902.

== Life and career ==
Most sources list Athens as Apostolou's birthplace, although some list it as the nearby small town of Menidi. As a boy he sang in the Greek Royal Chapel and other church choirs in Athens and later studied singing under Alexandros Katakouzenos and Napoleon Lambelet of the Athens Conservatory. He made his debut in 1888 with the newly-formed Elliniko Melodrama company (a forerunner of the Greek National Opera) in a production of Spyridon Xyndas's opera The Parliamentary Candidate. He became a leading tenor with the company both in Athens and on tour to audiences of the Greek diaspora in Egypt, Turkey, Russia, and Hungary. During this time he specialised in bel canto roles such as Elvino in La sonnambula. Edgardo in Lucia di Lammermoor, and Fernando in La favorita.

In 1890 Apostolou went to Milan for further study with the tenor Felice Pozzo and within a few months made his Italian debut in Ascoli as Alvaro in La forza del destino. Over the next fourteen years, he went on to sing in all the major opera houses in Italy, including La Scala, La Fenice, and the Teatro San Carlo in a repertoire that encompassed both lyric and spinto tenor roles. He sang Rodolfo in La bohème, Giuliano in I Medici, and the title role in Andrea Chenier in some of their earliest performances as well as creating the role of Marco Sanseverino in Giordano's Regina Diaz and singing the role of Karloo in the Italian premiere of Patrie!. He also appeared abroad in productions in Saint Petersburg and Warsaw and in 1897 at the Opéra de Monte-Carlo as Alfredo to Adelina Patti's Violetta in La traviata. Later in the season at Monte-Carlo, he sang the Duke of Mantua in Rigoletto and Edgardo in Lucia di Lammermoor.

Apostolou sang at the Piraeus Municipal Theatre in the 1901–1902 season and then returned to Naples where he had been a frequent performer at the Teatro San Carlo, having appeared there in the leading tenor roles of I Medici, La damnation de Faust, Mefistofele, Lohengrin, Lucia di Lammermoor, Maria di Rohan and Werther. He died in Naples on 28 August 1905 from a heart attack while still at the height of his career.
