= Teatro Comunale Giuseppe Borgatti, Cento =

Theatre building in Italy

Coordinates: 44°43′34.66″N 11°17′23.55″E

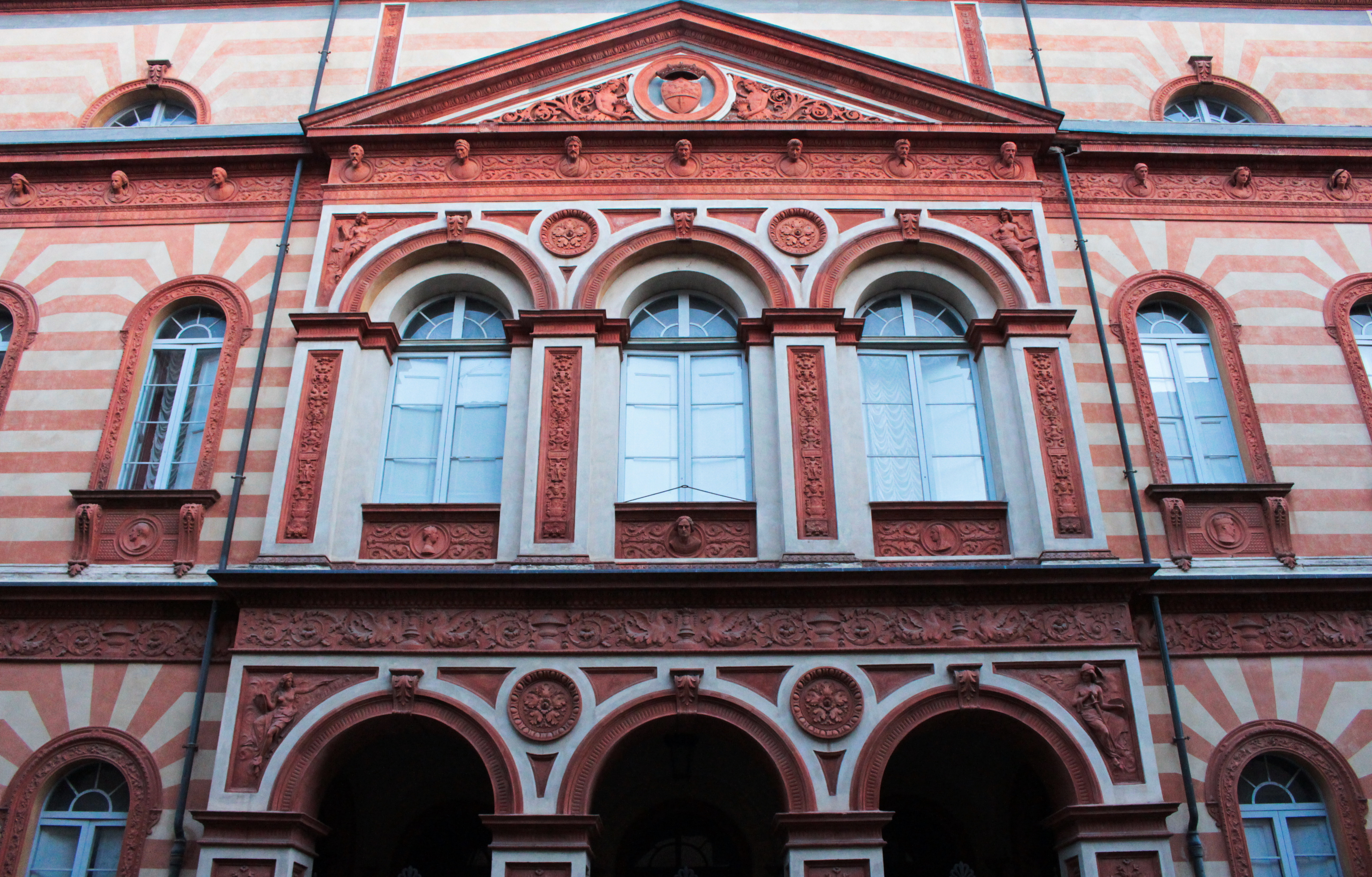
Teatro Borgatti

The Teatro Comunale Giuseppe Borgatti (Communal Theatre of Giuseppe Borgatti) is a 19th-century theatre and music performance hall located on Via Campagnoli Bartolomeo in Cento, Province of Ferrara, Region of Emilia-Romagna, Italy. The theater is named after the prominent tenor from Cento, Giuseppe Borgatti (1871–1950).

The theatre was built between 1856 and 1861 using designs by Antonio Giordani and Fortunato Lodi. The colourful exterior has a Neo-Romanesque style with rounded arches. The interiors were frescoed during the 19th century. The building houses two museums, dedicated to Borgatti and the flutist Arrigo Tassinari. Structural damage from the 2012 Northern Italy earthquakes led to closure of the theatre, until restorations were completed.
