= Guido Menasci =

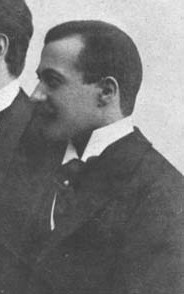

Background information
- Born: 24 March 1867; Livorno
- Origin: Italy
- Died: 27 December 1925 (aged 58) Livorno
- Genre: Opera
- Occupation: Librettist

Guido Menasci (24 March 1867 – 27 December 1925) was an Italian opera librettist.

His best-known work is Cavalleria rusticana written with Giovanni Targioni-Tozzetti. He also provided the libretti for Mascagni's I Rantzau, Zanetto, for Umberto Giordano's Regina Diaz, and Viktor Parma's Stara pesem (Old Song).

Menasci was born and died in Livorno.
