= Elena Bianchini-Cappelli =

Italian opera singer

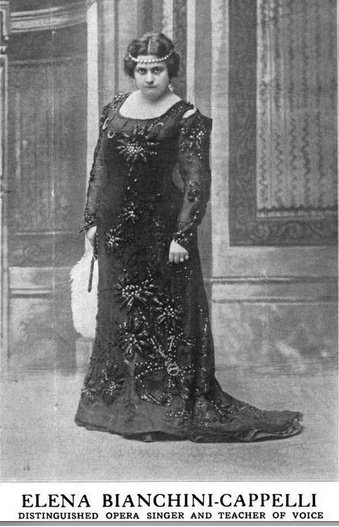
- Elena Bianchini-Cappelli as "Tosca", from a 1919 publication.

Background information
- Born: 1873
- Died: September 19, 1919 (aged 45–46) Rimini, Italy
- Occupation: Opera singer

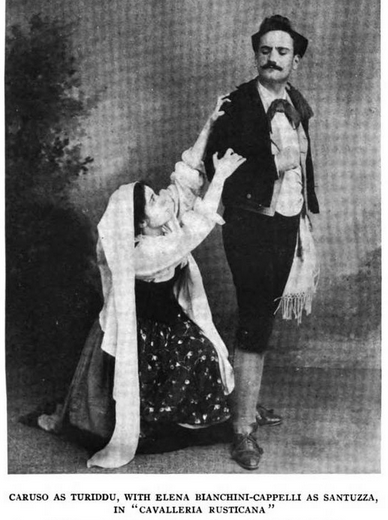
Elena Bianchini-Cappelli with Enrico Caruso in Cavalleria Rusticana, 1895; from a 1922 publication.

Elena Bianchini-Cappelli (1873 – September 19, 1919) was an Italian dramatic soprano opera singer.

== Early life ==
Elena Bianchini-Cappelli was from Rome. She studied voice with Guglielmo Vergine in Naples, while he was also teaching Enrico Caruso.

== Career ==
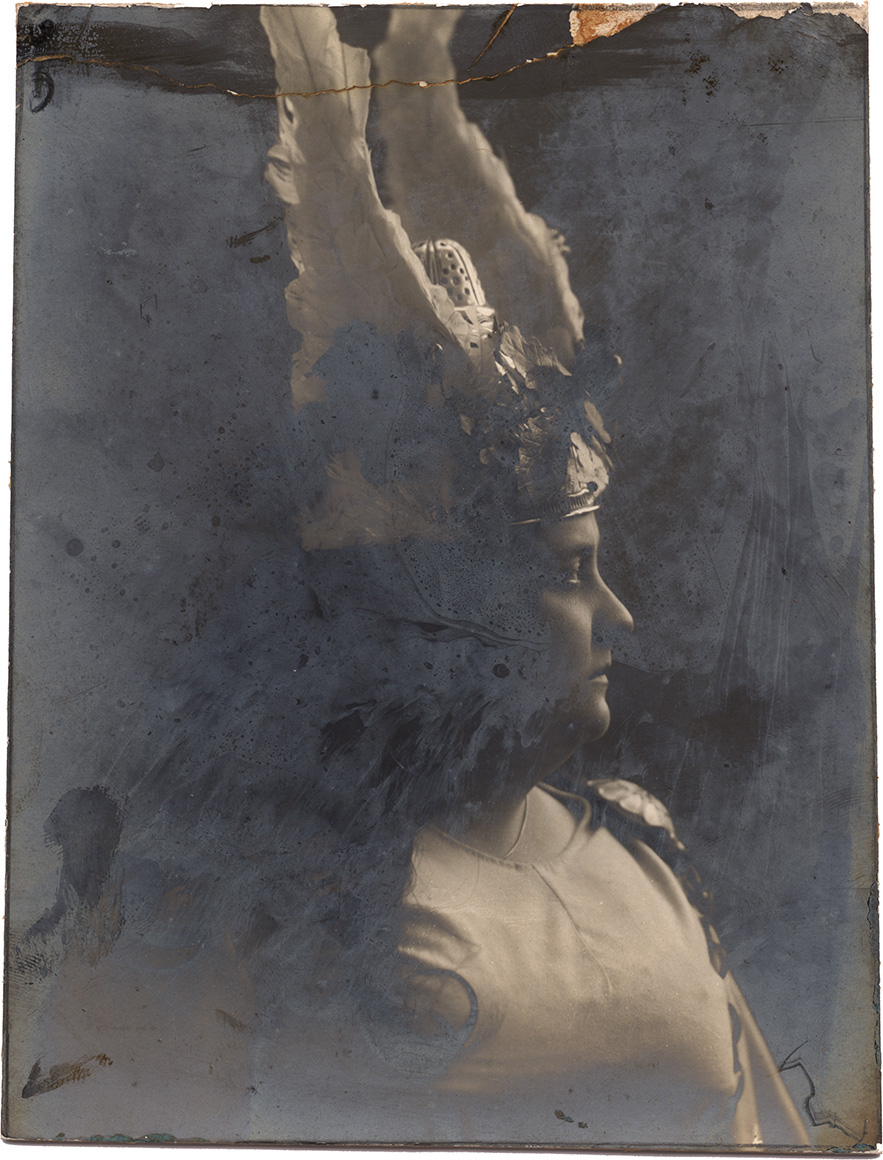
Elena Bianchini-Cappelli in the role of Brünnhilde in Wagner's Siegfried

She appeared with Caruso in 1895, in Cavalleria Rusticana at Caserta. The pair also appeared together in Puccini's Manon Lescaut in Cairo in 1895; the two were only given five days to learn the show before opening night, so Caruso fastened the score to Bianchini-Cappelli's back, limiting her stage movement: "I was helpless to do more than hold as still as possible, serving as a human music rack for my comrade," she recalled. "And what did the rascal do? He was bursting to laugh!"

In 1899 she was in the cast of Wagner's Siegfried at La Scala. She was in the cast of Verdi's Un ballo in maschera when it was conducted by Arturo Toscanini at Trento. She first performed in the United States in 1902, the year she sang "Sylvia" in Zanetto at the Metropolitan Opera House, under the direction of composer Pietro Mascagni.

In her forties she taught voice in New York City, endorsed by her old friend Caruso.

== Personal life and legacy ==
Elena Bianchini-Cappelli died in 1919, at her villa in Rimini, aged 46 years. There is a street named for Elena Bianchini-Cappelli in Rimini.
