= Peter Tiboris =

American conductor (1947–2024)

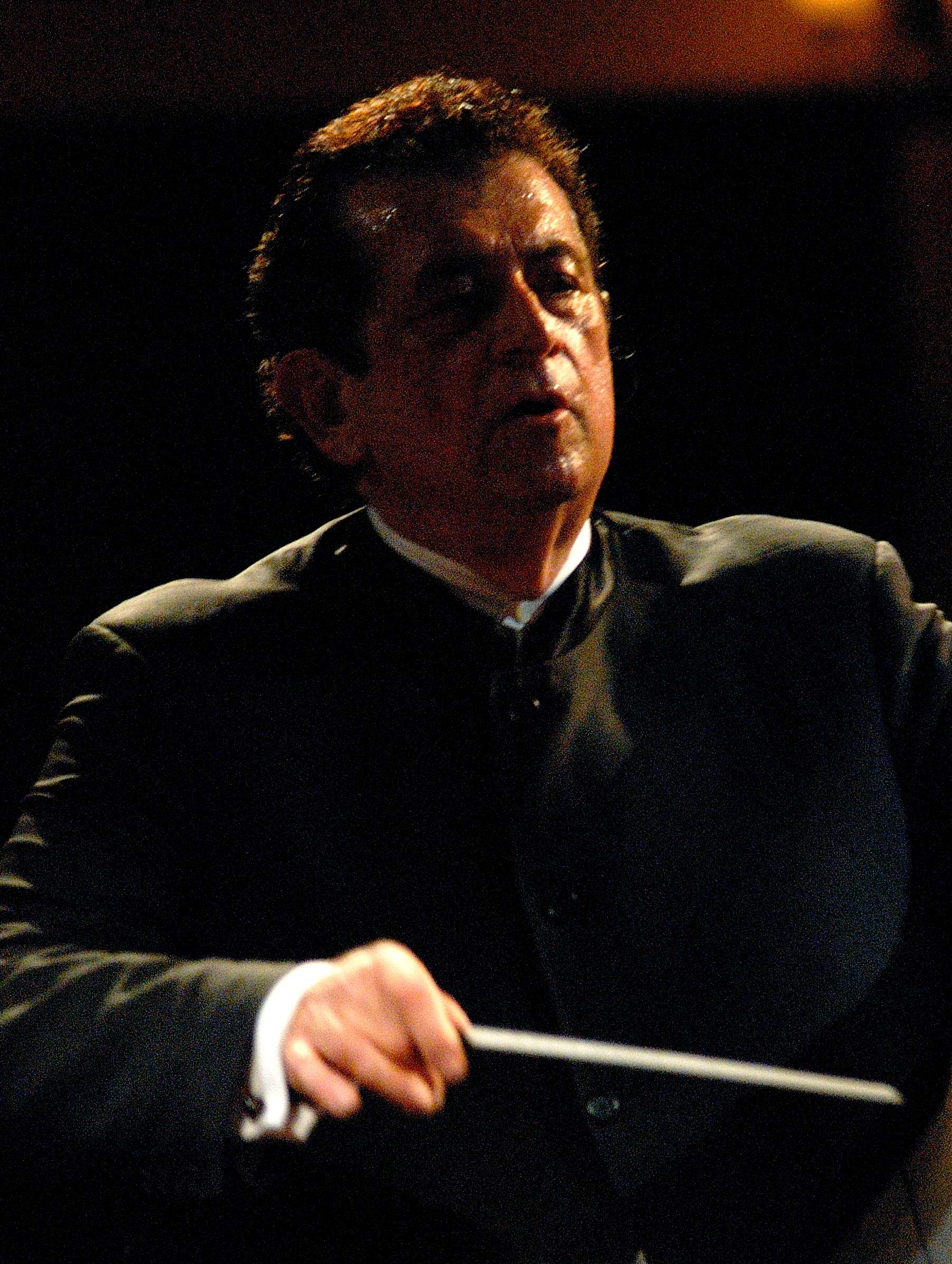
- Tiboris conducting in 2007
- Born: October 31, 1947; Sheboygan, Wisconsin, U.S.
- Died: September 17, 2024 (aged 76)
- Education: University of Wisconsin–Madison; University of Illinois at Urbana–Champaign
- Occupation: Producer

Peter Ernest Tiboris (October 31, 1947 – September 17, 2024) was an American concert producer, music director, and conductor. He was known for conducting and producing concerts at Carnegie Hall, and Lincoln Center, as well as in Greece. Through his company, MidAmerica Productions, he staged over 1,500 concerts worldwide.

== Early life and education ==
Tiboris was born in Sheboygan, Wisconsin, on October 31, 1947. His father, Ernest Peter Tiboris, was a dentist from Sheboygan, and his mother, Stella Menas, was a first-generation Orthodox Greek-American from Waukegan, Illinois.

Tiboris' interests in Greek culture and music began at age five with piano lessons and continued at age nine with organ lessons given by Peter Murtos of the St. Spyridon Greek Orthodox Church in Sheboygan. At age 10 he became St. Spyridon's organist. Tiboris studied music education at the University of Wisconsin–Madison, receiving a bachelor's degree (B.M.) in 1970 and a master's degree (M.S.) in 1974.

In 1980, he received a doctorate (Ed.D) in music education from the University of Illinois at Urbana–Champaign. Between 1970 and 1983, he taught as associate professor of music at the University of Southwestern Louisiana in Lafayette (now called University of Louisiana at Lafayette).

== MidAmerica Productions ==
While serving as associate professor in Louisiana in 1983, Tiboris was asked to organize a concert in New York City to commemorate the 25th anniversary of Archbishop Iakovos as Primate of the Greek Orthodox Church of North and South America. The concert, on January 7, 1984, at Alice Tully Hall, Lincoln Center, brought together soloists, choruses from Louisiana and New York, and the American Symphony Orchestra for a Greek-themed program which included the world premiere of Dinos Constantinides' Hymn to the Human Spirit and the New York premiere of his Lament of Antigone. The concert was also the New York conducting debut of Tiboris and the inaugural concert of MidAmerica Productions. A review of Tiboris' first concert, written by Tim Page from The New York Times, deemed Tiboris' New York conducting debut "vigorous... alert, energetic."

Tiboris conducted many works in the choral repertoire as well as symphonic works, operas, and ballets, including Taneyev, and Mikis Theodorakis, as well as rarely performed works by Cherubini and Rossini. He also conducted in more than 20 countries. In March 2016, he made his Asian conducting debut with the Macau Symphony Orchestra in China.

MidAmerica Productions has presented over 1,500 concerts worldwide, including over 1,000 concerts in New York, in such venues as Stern Auditorium, Weill Recital Hall at Carnegie Hall, Avery Fisher Hall and Alice Tully Hall, Lincoln Center. The original choral format has expanded to include Madrigal Festivals, a National Wind Ensemble, Vocal Jazz Festivals, National Festival Youth Orchestra, Sweet Adelines, and solo concerts featuring Stanley Drucker. Since 1988, English composer and conductor John Rutter has made over 100 appearances with MidAmerica, including at the world premiere of his Mass of the Children in February 2003.

The company has become a launching pad for Elysium Recordings, Inc., a CD label founded in 1995 which includes significant works by Mascagni and performances by Lukas Foss. They founded an annual music festival in Greece, the Festival of the Aegean, on the Island of Syros, with performances of music including opera, orchestra, jazz and folk. Tiboris founded MidAm International, Inc., a producer of concerts in Europe and Asia.

== Personal life and death ==
Tiboris was married to the soprano Eilana Lappalainen; he had two children from a previous marriage. His son E. Peter Tiboris, became chairman of the board of MidAmerica Productions. Tiboris wrote an autobiography together with Alex Kitroeff, released in 2024 to mark the 40th anniversary of MidAmerica Productions, A Musical Odyssey.

Tiboris died on September 17, 2024, at the age of 76.

== Discography ==
Work	Year	Label	Number	OCLC
Tchaikovsky: Romeo and Juliet; Sergei Taneyev: Symphony No. 4	1992	Bridge	9034	OCLC 811335005
Beethoven: Symphony No. 9 "Choral"	1992	Bridge	9033	OCLC 638641549
Beethoven: Symphony No. 5, Symphony No. 7 (Mahler retouchings/re-orchestrations)	1993	Albany	110	OCLC 29950131
Schubert: Symphony No. 9; Beethoven: Overture The Consecration of the House	1993	Albany	089	OCLC 29010467
Verdi: Requiem	1995	Elysium	GRK708	OCLC 728373734
Mascagni: Silvano	1995	Elysium	GRK707	OCLC 605392623
Haydn and Hellenic Antiquity: Symphony No. 43 “Mercury", Scena di Berenice, Ariadne auf Naxos (cantata), aria from Orfeo, aria for Tommaso Traetta's Iphigenia	1995	Elysium	GRK706	OCLC 34019455
All Beethoven: Symphony No. 3 "Eroica", Coriolan Overture, Leonore Overture No. 2	1995	Elysium	GRK702	OCLC 33383413
All Dvorak: The Water Goblin, Symphonic Variations, Slavonic Rhapsody, Op. 45, No. 2; Scherzo capriccioso	1995	Elysium	GRK701	OCLC 1155700436
Dvorak: The Spectre's Bride	1995	Elysium	GRK700	OCLC 1145562625
Mozart: Symphony No. 40, Symphony No. 41 "Jupiter"; Beethoven: Leonore Overture No. 3	1996	Elysium	GRK710	OCLC 1145574672
Beethoven: Symphony No. 5, Symphony No. 7 (Mahler retouchings)	1997	Elysium	GRK712	OCLC 1155699354
Music for Doubles: works by Franz Krommer, Camille Saint-Saëns and Bohuslav Martinů	1998	Elysium	GRK714	OCLC 1145581749
Mascagni: Zanetto, intermezos from L'amico Fritz and Cavalleria rusticana	2008	Elysium	GRK726	OCLC 1285136490
