= Rodolfo Ferrari =

Italian conductor (1864–1919)

Rodolfo Ferrari (1864 – January 10, 1919) was an Italian conductor.

Born in Staggia, near San Prospero, Province of Modena, Ferrari studied music initially with his father, an amateur musician, then continued under Alessandro Busi at the Conservatory (Liceo Musicale) in Bologna, graduating in composition in 1882.

Ferrari appeared in the most important Italian and foreign theaters, conducting both operas and symphonic music, and was particularly attracted by the operas of Richard Wagner.

Among the world premières directed by Ferrari, those of L'amico Fritz (Rome, 1891) and Silvano (Milan, 1895) by Pietro Mascagni, Andrea Chénier (Milan, 1896) and Regina Diaz (Naples, 1894) by Umberto Giordano, La Tilda by Francesco Cilea (Florence, 1892), I Medici by Ruggero Leoncavallo (Milan, 1893), La colonia libera by Pietro Floridia (Rome, 1899), Ondina by Giovanni Bucceri (Naples, 1917) and Villa Clermont by Daniele Napoletano (Naples, 1918).

Ferrari was the conductor of the first Italian performances of Manon by Jules Massenet (Milan, 1894) and Parsifal (Bologna, 1914). During the season 1907–1908 he conducted several Italian operas at the Metropolitan Opera in New York City.

Ferrari married the harpist Cleopatra Serato. He died in Rome and was buried in the cemetery of the Certosa di Bologna.
