= Concepció Bordalba =

Spanish opera singer (died 1910)

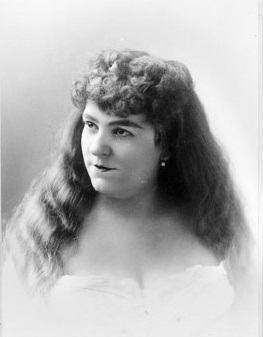
- Born: Concepció Bordalba i Simón; September 13, 1862; Barcelona, Spain
- Died: June 6, 1910 (aged 47); Barcelona, Spain
- Other name: Concetta Bordalba
- Occupation: Opera singer (soprano)

Concepció Bordalba i Simón (13 September 1862 – 6 June 1910) was a Spanish operatic soprano who performed under the name Concetta Bordalba outside her native Spain. She spent most of her career in Italy or with touring Italian opera companies and was particularly known for her performances as Elsa in Wagner's Lohengrin and Margherita in Boito's Mefistofele.

== Life and career ==
Bordalba was born in Barcelona on 13 September 1862. She studied at the Conservatori Superior de Música del Liceu in her native city. While there she sang in the opera Laura Debellan which Marià Obiols had composed especially for the students at the conservatory. By 1881 she had been engaged as a principal soprano for the opera season at the Teatro Apolo in Madrid. After further studies with Federico Blasco in Milan she made her debut in Italian opera houses in 1887, singing Elisabetta in Don Carlo at the Teatro Carlo Felice in Genoa and Leonora in Il trovatore in Venice. She went on to sing leading dramatic soprano roles in Italy, as well as appearing with touring Italian opera companies in North America in 1889 and South America in 1892. She also sang in Moscow in 1890 appearing in the title role of Aida and as Valentine in Les Huguenots.

In 1894, Bordalba appeared in Naples at the Teatro Mercadante where she sang the title role in the world premiere of Giordano's Regina Diaz and at the Teatro San Carlo where she sang Marguerite in La damnation de Faust. She was at La Scala in Milan in 1896, again singing Marguerite as well as Maria in Mascagni's Guglielmo Ratcliff. Although her career was primarily in Italy or with Italian touring companies, she returned to her native Barcelona in 1897 to sing Leonora in Il trovatore at the Gran Teatre del Liceu and in the 1901/1902 season when she again sang Leonora, as well as Elsa in Lohengrin. She retired from the stage in 1904 and then taught singing at the Conservatori Superior de Música del Liceu where her students included Elvira de Hidalgo who, in turn, became the teacher of Maria Callas. Bordalba died in Barcelona in 1910.
