= Giuseppe Borgatti =

Italian opera singer

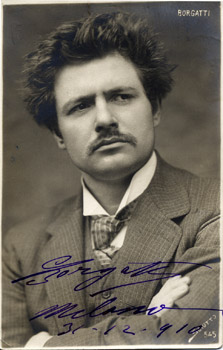
Giuseppe Borgatti

Giuseppe Borgatti (Cento, 17 March 1871 – Reno di Leggiuno, 18 October 1950) was an Italian dramatic tenor with an outstanding voice. (See Michael Scott, cited below, for a laudatory appraisal of his singing.) The creator of the title role in Umberto Giordano's verismo opera Andrea Chénier, he subsequently earned renown for his performances of the music of Richard Wagner, becoming in 1904 the first Italian tenor to appear at the Bayreuth Festival. He sang a variety of leading roles at La Scala, Milan, from 1896 until 1914, but deteriorating eyesight caused by glaucoma put a premature end to his stage career, after which he turned successfully to teaching.

== Biography ==
Borgatti was born into a poor rural family from the Province of Ferrara in northern Italy and grew up illiterate, according to the music-performance historian John Rosselli. This handicap did not prevent Borgatti from finding work as a bricklayer/stone-cutter. He was also called up by the authorities to discharge a compulsory period of military service. Luckily, a wealthy patron happened to hear him sing. Struck by the inherent quality of Borgatti's voice, the patron arranged for him to have professional singing lessons and acquire basic educational skills. His voice teachers included Alessandro Busi in Bologna and, later, Carlo d'Ormeville.

In 1892 (some sources say 1893), Borgatti made his operatic debut at Castelfranco Veneto, singing the role of Faust in the opera of the same name by Charles Gounod. A string of performances at other Italian opera houses ensued in mainly lyric parts. Eighteen ninety-four saw Borgatti successfully undertake the role of the Chevalier des Grieux in a notable production in Venice of Giacomo Puccini's Manon Lescaut. Later that same year he appeared at another major venue, the Teatro Dal Verme in Milan, as Lohengrin (his first assumption of a Wagnerian part). His career was now gaining real momentum but he would not become a major opera star until 1896 when, at Milan's La Scala, he sang in the premiere performance of Andrea Chénier to great acclaim.

Although Borgatti continued to appear in a number of Italian operas after 1896, earning particular renown for his performances in works by Giuseppe Verdi, Puccini and the various verismo composers, he fell strongly under the spell of Wagner's music dramas. He worked closely with La Scala's principal conductor, Arturo Toscanini, from 1898 through into the early 1900s, and proceeded to master all the main tenor parts of the Wagnerian repertoire, namely, Lohengrin, Tannhäuser, Walther, Tristan, Siegmund, Siegfried and, finally, Parsifal. In 1898, he toured South America with a first-class troupe of Italian singers which included his fellow tenor Francesco Tamagno, the soprano Luisa Tetrazzini and the baritones Mario Sammarco and Eugenio Giraldoni. He also visited Spain and Russia.

In 1901, he took part in a "grand concert" at La Scala that had been organised to mark the recent death of Verdi. Toscanini conducted the concert and among the array of soloists participating in it with Borgatti were Tamagno and the rising tenor star Enrico Caruso. Borgatti was accorded the honour of being the first Italian tenor invited to sing at Germany's Bayreuth Festival in 1904. Both Cosima Wagner (the composer's widow and the festival's director) and the important Wagnerian conductor Hans Richter praised Borgatti's voice and artistry. In 1906, he made a different venture into the field of German opera when he sang Herod in the La Scala premiere of Salome by Richard Strauss. Two years later, he was called upon to perform at the new Teatro Colón in Buenos Aires.

Good-looking and solidly built—as photographs attest—Borgatti is described in contemporary reviews of his performances as having possessed abundant reserves of stamina and strong histrionic ability in addition to a smooth, well-schooled voice of robust size. Modern-day critics, including Scott, J.B. Steane and John Freestone, have praised him, too, for the clarity of his diction, the limpidity of his tone and the fineness of his phrasing. He took pride in the fact that even after he took on the heavy Wagnerian repertoire, he was still able to put across a bel canto aria like "Una furtiva lagrima" (from Gaetano Donizetti's L'elisir d'amore) with lyrical ease. Oddly enough, despite his exceptional attainments as a singer and interpretive artist, he never performed in London or New York City.

At the height of his career, in 1907, Borgatti began losing his sight due to glaucoma. This affliction grew steadily worse, obliging him to retire from the operatic stage seven years after its onset, even though his voice was still in excellent condition. He kept giving concerts, however, and the theatre in his home town of Cento was named in his honour in 1924. By this juncture, he was blind in both eyes. His last public performance occurred in Bologna in 1928. He taught singing in Milan following the curtailment of his opera house career. His best known pupils were the English lyric tenor Heddle Nash (1894–1961) and the German lyric baritone Willi Domgraf-Fassbaender (1897–1978).

Borgatti married one of his singing teachers, Elena Cuccoli. They had a daughter, Renata Borgatti (1894–1964), who became a concert pianist. Borgatti died at a resort town near Italy's Lake Maggiore in 1950, aged 79.

== Recordings ==
Giuseppe Borgatti's singing is preserved on fewer than 20 acoustic discs that he made in Milan for Fonotipia Records and the Pathé company in 1905 and 1919 respectively. They include extracts from four different operatic works by Wagner, all sung in Italian, and one aria each by Verdi ("Niun me tema" from Otello) and Puccini ("E lucevan le stelle" from Tosca; Borgatti had been La Scala's original Cavaradossi in 1900). For some reason, he recorded nothing from his breakthrough opera, Andrea Chénier, or from some of the other Italian operas with which he had become especially associated, such as Mefistofele, Aida, La traviata, La Gioconda, Pagliacci, Manon Lescaut and Fedora. He did, however, commit to wax his interpretations of two short examples of lieder by Robert Schumann. Like the Wagner pieces, they are sung in Italian. Borgatti's acoustic recordings are available on various CD anthologies, including those issued by the Symposium label (catalogue number 1199), EMI's "La Scala Edition, Volume One" (CHS 7 64860 2) and Nuova Era Records (PH 5110).

In 1928, he recorded several rare sides electrically for the Columbia company.

== See also ==
- Teatro Comunale Giuseppe Borgatti, Cento
