= Antonio Cortis =

Spanish tenor

Antonio Cortis (12 August 1891 – 2 April 1952) was a Spanish tenor with an outstanding voice. He was acclaimed by audiences on both sides of the Atlantic for his exciting performances of Italian operatic works, especially those by Giuseppe Verdi, Giacomo Puccini and the verismo composers.

== Career ==
Cortis was born at sea but his birthplace is often given as Dénia, in which city he spent his infancy. (His name was originally Antonio Monton Corts but he changed it for theatrical purposes.) He studied music at the Madrid Royal Conservatory and sang in a children's choir. In 1909, he and his widowed mother moved from Madrid to Barcelona, where he attended the local conservatory.

He made his stage debut in 1912 at the Liceo in Barcelona as a comprimario singer, but he gradually worked his way up to major roles at a variety of opera houses in Spain and South America, including the Teatro Colón in Buenos Aires. On the South American tour of 1917, the young tenor was befriended by the Metropolitan Opera star Enrico Caruso, who encouraged him to pursue his singing career in New York City. Cortis declined Caruso's offer of help for personal reasons but he would henceforth model his singing technique on Caruso's great example.

His international career began in earnest with successful appearances in Naples and, more importantly, at Rome's Teatro Costanzi in 1920, where he signed a three-year contract. He proceeded to sing in Stockholm, Milan, Latin America and Berlin and, most famously, with the esteemed company at the Chicago Civic Opera from 1924 to 1932. His debut at the Royal Opera House, Covent Garden, occurred in 1931, as Calaf in Puccini's Turandot. He appeared often on the Italian opera-house circuit during the early 1930s but success at Milan's La Scala, with its entrenched roster of popular Italian-born tenors, eluded him.

Cortis came to be regarded as one of the best inter-war interpreters of verismo opera. He was particularly praised for his performances of Calaf and of Dick Johnson in Puccini's La fanciulla del West, while he sang with remarkable ease the strenuous music composed for the tenor voice by Umberto Giordano and Pietro Mascagni. Cortis also undertook Verdi roles, such as the Duke in Rigoletto, which he delivered with impressive skill and style.

He chose to spend the final phase of his career in Spain as the Great Depression deeply affected the economies of America and other parts of the world. Although his voice was still in good condition, he withdrew from the operatic stage in the mid-1930s. His decision to retire was influenced by the onset of the Spanish Civil War. He composed some vocal works during this period and founded a school for singers in Valencia in 1940. After World War II, he came out of retirement to appear occasionally in Spanish operas and other works. His health deteriorated in the early 1950s and he died at the age of 60 in Valencia.

== Recordings and assessment ==
Cortis made a number of top-quality recordings of operatic arias and songs in 1925–1930, mainly for His Master's Voice but also for the Victor label. They consist of pieces by Gounod, Meyerbeer, Massenet, Donizetti, Verdi, Puccini, Giordano and Mascagni, and by Spanish composers such as Gaztambide, Vives and Serrano. (These recordings are now available on CD reissues, most notably those produced by the Pearl and Preiser companies.)

For a public performer, Cortis possessed a comparatively reserved personality. This natural reticence may have prevented him from making the most of career opportunities when they presented themselves. Nevertheless, music critics consider his potent, dark-coloured voice to be one of the finest lyric-dramatic tenor instruments ever captured on disc. No mere 'belter', he sang with imagination and sound musicianship as well as thrilling tone.
