= L'americano (Piccinni) =

Intermezzo by Niccolò Piccinni

- Intermezzo by Niccolò Piccinni
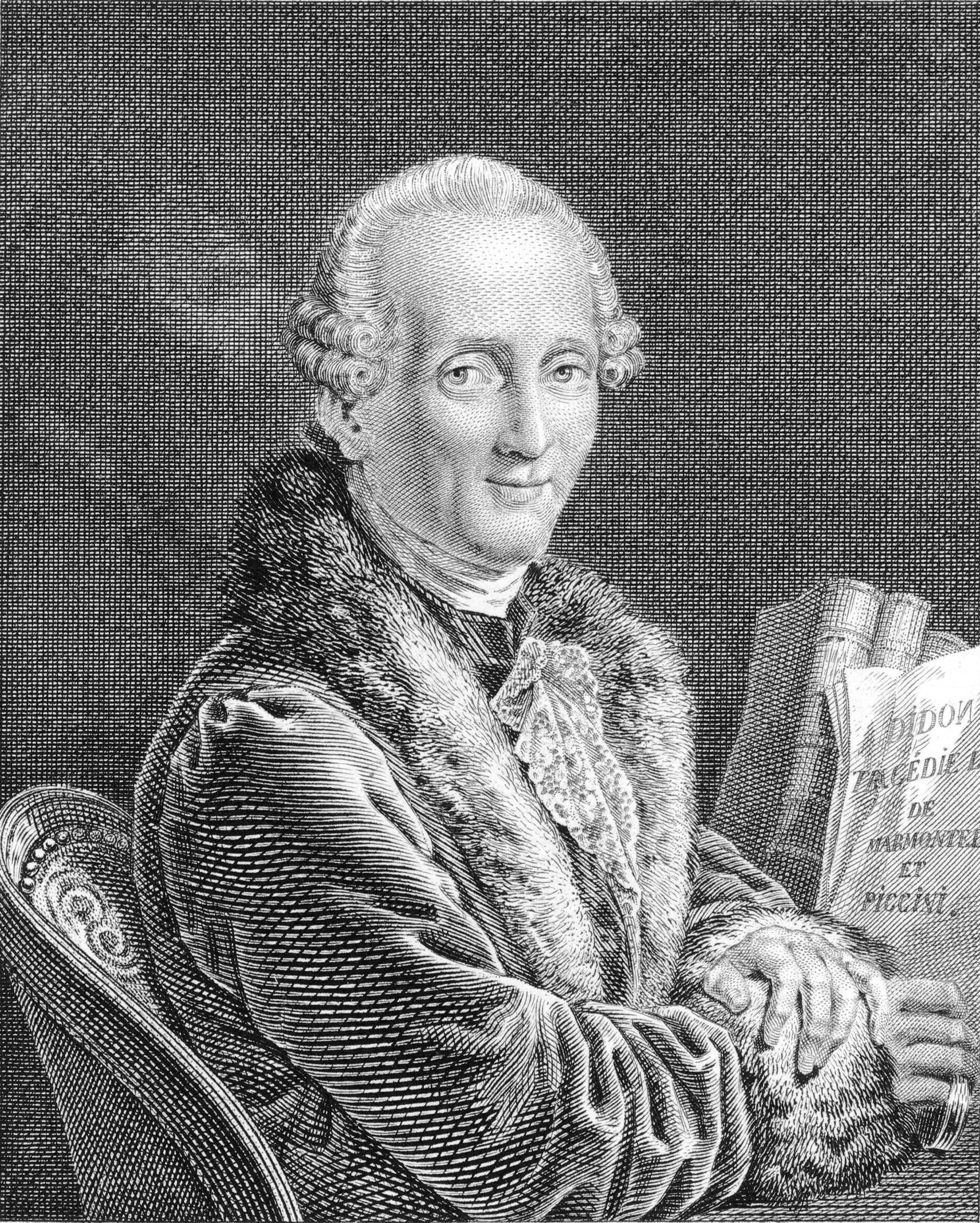
- Niccolò Piccinni, engraving by Hippolyte Pauquet
- Librettist: Angelo Lungi
- Language: Italian
- Premiere: 22 February 1772; Teatro Valle, Rome

L'americano (The American) is an intermezzo for four voices in two acts by composer Niccolò Piccinni with an Italian libretto by Angelo Lungi. The opera was premiered on 22 February 1772, at the Teatro Valle in Rome in celebration of Carnival. Musically, this work is unusual as it is much lengthier than most intermezzos and has an abundance of arias but very few ensemble numbers and duets.

== Roles ==
Cast	Voice type	Premiere cast: 22 February 1772 (Conductor: - )
Cavalier Lisandro, an Italian aristocrat	baritone	
Donna Aurora, Lisandro's fiancée and an aristocrat	soprano castrato travesti	
Villotto, an American	tenor	
Silvia, Aurora's friend but of a lower social class	soprano castrato travesti	

== Synopsis ==
Villotto, an American, befriends the Cavalier Lisandro on his visit to the California peninsula. Lisandro decides that it would be fun to take Villotto back to Europe to the chagrin of his fiancée, Donna Aurora. Villotto makes all sorts of social errors that upset the aristocratic Aurora. To make matters worse, Lisandro begins to fall in love with Aurora's friend Sylvia. After all sorts of misadventures, Aurora ends up falling for Lisandro and Villotto ends up happily with Sylvia.

== Recordings ==
- L'Americano with conductor Eric Hull and the Orchestra Internazionale d'Italia. Cast includes: Patrizia Ciofi (Silvia); Giovanna Donadini (Donna Aurora); Simon Edwards (Villotto); Domenico Colaianni (Lisandro). It was recorded live at the Valle d’Itria Festival in July 1996 and is the only recording of this opera to date. Released on the Dynamic label in 1998.
