= Marcella (Giordano) =

1907 opera by Umberto Giordano

Marcella is a 1907 opera by Umberto Giordano.

== Recordings ==
- Marcella, DVD filmed at the Palazzo Ducale, Martina Franca, Italy, 4–6 August 2007, as part of the 33rd Festival of the Valle d'Itria, Serena Daolio, Danilo Formaggia, Pierluigi Dilengite, Natalizia Carone, Angelica Girardi, Mara D’Antini, Maria Rosa Rondinelli, Marcello Rosiello, Giovanni Coletta & Graziano De Pace Orchestra Internazionale d’Italia & Slovak Chamber Choir, Manlio Benzi (conductor) & Alessio Pizzech (director). Dynamic
