= Sebastian F. Schwarz =

Sebastian F. Schwarz (born 1974 in Rostock, East Germany) is a German-born musician, teacher, administrator and podcaster.

He studied vocal performance and musicology in Berlin and Conservatory Benedetto Marcello in Venice，and theatre management at the University of Venice. He worked as a language coach for German, English and Russian productions at Teatro La Fenice and as an artists' manager in Milan and Venice. For several years, he taught history of music and at tertiary level.

As of March 2026 he is Casting Manager of Milan's Teatro alla Scala and therefore responsible for its selection of singers.

For 2025 - 2027 Schwarz is creator and host of Opera Road Trip, OperaVision's and Opera Europa's two year podcast series exploring the operatic traditions of the partner countries of OperaVision.

From 2021 to 2024 Schwarz was artistic director of Festival della Valle d'Itria and the Accademia del Belcanto "Rodolfo Celletti" in Martina Franca.

In July 2019, the Italian Minister of Culture signed him into office as Sovrintendente (CEO) of the Royal Theatre of Turin, Teatro Regio di Torino of which as of 1 September, he also assumed the role of artistic director.

He was appointed General Director of Glyndebourne Festival Opera in November 2015, and left the position in December 2017.

Prior to this from 2008 to 2016 he was Deputy Artistic Director of the Theater an der Wien and, from 2012 to 2016, also artistic director of the Vienna Chamber Opera. He held a variety of other posts, including with the Wexford Festival Opera and as assistant to the opera director at the Staatsoper Hamburg. In 2010 he was a co-founder and artistic director of the International Singing Competition for Baroque Opera Pietro Antonio Cesti, part of the Innsbruck Festival of Early Music and continues to serve as its president of the jury.

He is a regular jury member for major international voice competitions and founder and inaugural chairman of the jury of the Glyndebourne Opera Cup.

Schwarz is vice president of the Internationale Richard Strauss Gesellschaft and serves on the board of Europäische Musiktheaterakademie.

== Honours and awards ==
In 2015, Schwarz was appointed Knight of the Order of the Star of Italy by the Italian President in recognition of his efforts to promote Italian culture.
