= Mercedes Capsir =

Catalan operatic soprano

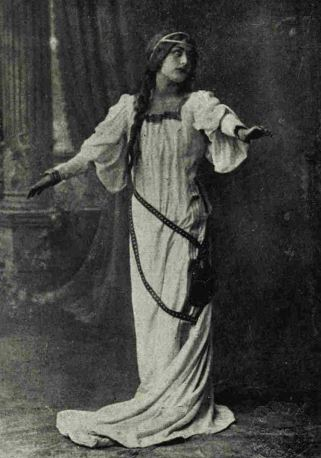
- Capsir on the magazine El Teatre Català, 23 August 1913
- Born: Mercè Capsir i Vidal; 3 August 1897; Barcelona, Kingdom of Spain
- Died: 13 March 1969 (aged 71); Suzzara, Italy
- Occupation: Operatic soprano
- Years active: 1913–1949

Mercedes Capsir i Vidal (Catalan pronunciation: [məɾˈsɛðəs kəpˈsi]; 3 August 1897 – 13 March 1969) was a Spanish operatic soprano who an international career from 1914 to 1949. She excelled in the coloratura soprano literature and was particularly associated with the roles of Elvira in I puritani, Rosina in The Barber of Seville, Gilda in Rigoletto, Violetta in La traviata, and the title role in Lucia di Lammermoor. In the 1940s she moved into heavier lyric soprano repertoire before retiring from the stage. She had a second career as a voice teacher at Barcelona Conservatory from 1949 to 1968.

== Early life and education ==
The daughter of zarzuela performers José Capsir and Ramona Vidal, Mercedes Capsir was born in Barcelona on 3 August 1897. She was born in the same house where another Spanish soprano, Maria Barrientos, had been born 13 years earlier. She studied singing privately in her native city with Bidai Neunei. She also trained at the Conservatori Superior de Música del Liceu where her voice teacher was Joaquim Vidal Nunell.

== Career ==
Capsir made her professional debut at the Liceu in 1914 as Gilda in Rigoletto; a part which became one of her signature roles. She was also heard at the Liceu in 1914 as a flower maiden in Wagner's Parsifal. In 1916 she gave her first performances at the Teatro Real in Madrid in a reprisal of Gilda and as Violetta in La traviata. She starred in operas at the Teatro Colón in Buenos Aires in 1916 and 1920; having great success there as both Verdi's Gilda and Rosina in Rossini's The Barber of Seville. In the 1916-1917 season she sang at the Teatro Nacional de São Carlos in Lisbon, and had a major triumph in 1917 at the Teatro Comunale di Bologna in 1917 as Rossini's Rosina. In March 1917 she portrayed Rosina at the Paris Opera with Mattia Battistini in the title role.

In 1919 Capsir returned to Italy for performances in Bologna and in Florence. She was also active in Italy in 1922 at the Teatro Dal Verme in Milan, La Fenice in Venice, and the Teatro Costanzi in Rome. In 1923 she gave her first performances at the Opéra de Monte-Carlo as Gilda and Rosina; returning to that theatre later in her career as Musetta in Puccini's La bohème and in the title role of Flotow's Martha. She was a recurring guest at La Scala from 1924 to 1934; appearing there often as Gilda which she first sang at that theatre under Arturo Toscanini. In 1929 she created the role of Rosalina in the world premiere of Umberto Giordano's Il Re at La Scala.

In 1923-1924 Capsir performed with the touring Italiaansche Opera company in Holland. She performed at the Berlin State Opera in 1924, and appeared at the Royal Opera House in London as Rosina in 1926. In 1930 she gave performances in Sweden and Copenhagen. In 1933 she performed opposite Giacomo Lauri-Volpi at the Maggio Musicale Fiorentino as Elvira in I puritani under the baton of Tullio Serafin. In 1935 she performed at the Vienna State Opera, and the Hungarian State Opera House. In 1936 she performed at the Bavarian State Opera in Munich. Other roles in her repertoire included Amina in La sonnambula and Lucia in Lucia di Lammermoor.

In the 1940s Capsir was active mainly at the Liceu during which time she moved into heavier lyric soprano roles like Cio-Cio-San in Puccini's Madama Butterfly, Elsa in Wagner's Lohengrin, and Mimi in La bohème. Her last performance was at the Liceu in 1949; portraying Carolina in Il matrimonio segreto. After retiring from the stage, she worked as a professor of voice at the Conservatori Superior de Música del Liceu from 1949 to 1968.

== Death ==
Capsir died on March 13, 1969 in Suzzara near Mantua in Lombardy, Italy at the age of 71.

== Recordings ==
Capsir's earliest recordings were made Odeon Records and His Master's Voice in 1914. For Columbia Records she made complete opera recordings of Il barbiere di Siviglia, Rigoletto, Lucia di Lammermoor, La traviata, and Don Pasquale.
