= Festival della Valle d'Itria =

Italian opera festival

The Festival della Valle d'Itria is a summer opera festival held in the south eastern Italian town of Martina Franca in the Apulia region. The Festival was founded in 1975 and performances are given in July and August each summer on a specially constructed stage in the outdoor courtyard of the Palazzo Ducale. The primary aim of the festival is to present obscure, neglected or rarely performed works, and often works in the standard operatic repertoire are given in their original versions. At the fiftieth anniversary festival in 2024, the original two-soprano version of Norma was revived, alongside Handel’s Ariodante, and Nino Rota’s Aladino e la lampada magica.

== History ==
The Festival della Valle d'Itria is held annually in the south eastern Italian town of Martina Franca in the Apulia region. The Festival was founded in 1975 and performances are given in July and August each summer on a specially constructed stage in the outdoor courtyard of the Palazzo Ducale. The original vision for the festival is credited to Paolo Grassi, and it was brought to fruition by Rodolfo Celletti, after Bassi's death in 1981.

From 2022 the German opera manager Sebastian F. Schwarz served as Artistic Director, followed by Silvia Colasanti from 2025. The longtime music director is Fabio Luisi.

The primary aim of the festival is to present obscure, neglected or rarely performed works, and often works in the standard operatic repertoire are given in their original versions (such as Verdi's original 1857 version of Simon Boccanegra). The festival celebrated its fiftieth year in 2024 with a production of the original two-soprano version of Bellini's Norma. Jacquelyn Wagner played Norma, while Valentina Farcaş sang Adalgisa. Alongside Norma, the 2024 festival also presented Handel’s Ariodante, starring Cecilia Molinari, in a new edition by Bernardo Ticci, and Nino Rota’s Aladino e la lampada magica. For the 2025 festival the theme is war and peace, with planned performances of Rossini's Tancredi, Britten's Owen Wingrave and Ravel's L’enfant et les sortilèges.

== Notable revivals ==
Notable revivals include:

- 33rd Festival 2007 Marcella by Umberto Giordano
- 34th Festival 2008 Pelagio (opera) by Saverio Mercadante
- 2012 Artaserse (1730 Venice version) by Hasse
- 2015 Medea in Corinto by Mayr
- 2017 Margherita d'Anjou by Giacomo Meyerbeer
- 2022 Il Xerse by Francesco Cavalli
- 2023 L'Orazio by Pietro Auletta
