= Giovanni Targioni-Tozzetti =

Italian librettist

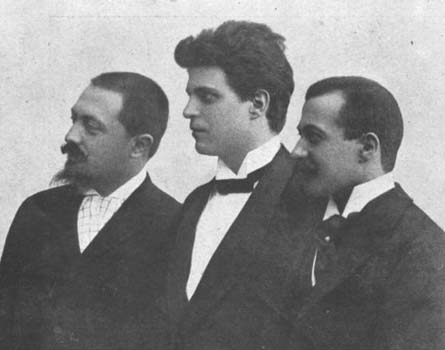
- Giovanni Targioni-Tozzetti (left) with Pietro Mascagni and Guido Menasci
- Born: Giovanni Targioni-Tozzetti; 17 March 1863
- Died: 30 May 1934 (aged 71)

Giovanni Targioni-Tozzetti (17 March 1863 – 30 May 1934) was an Italian librettist.

== Biography ==
He was best known for his friendship and collaboration with the composer Pietro Mascagni. Most of his libretti were written in collaboration with Guido Menasci.

Targioni-Tozzetti was born and died in Livorno.

== Operas ==
- Cavalleria rusticana (1890)
- I Rantzau (1892)
- Regina Diaz (1894)
- Silvano (1895)
- Zanetto (1896)
- Amica (1905)
- La sposa di Nino (1913)
- Pinotta (1932)
- Nerone (1935)
