= Libretto =

Text used in an extended musical work such as an opera or musical

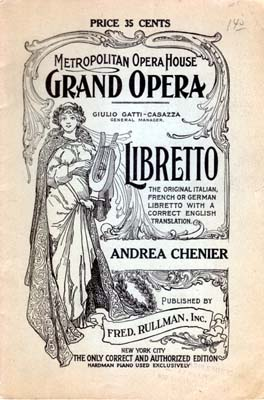
Cover of a 1921 libretto for Giordano's Andrea Chénier

A libretto (from the Italian word libretto, lit. 'booklet') is the text used in, or intended for, an extended musical work such as an opera, operetta, masque, oratorio, cantata or musical. The term libretto is also sometimes used to refer to the story line of a ballet or the texts of major liturgical works, such as the Mass, requiem, or sacred cantata.

The Italian word libretto (pronounced [liˈbretto], plural libretti [liˈbretti]) is the diminutive of the word libro ("book"). Sometimes other-language equivalents are used for libretti in that language, livret for French works, Textbuch for German and libreto for Spanish. A libretto is distinct from a synopsis or scenario of the plot, in that the libretto contains all the words and stage directions, while a synopsis summarizes the plot. Some ballet historians also use the word libretto to refer to the 15- to 40-page books which were on sale to 19th century ballet audiences in Paris and contained a very detailed description of the ballet's story, scene by scene.

The relationship of the librettist (that is, the writer of a libretto) to the composer in the creation of a musical work has varied over the centuries, as have the sources and the writing techniques employed.

In the context of a modern English-language musical theatre piece, the libretto is considered to encompass both the book of the work (i.e., the spoken dialogue) and the sung lyrics.

== Relationship of composer and librettist ==
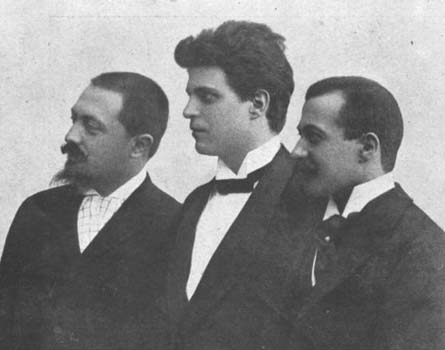
The composer of Cavalleria rusticana, Pietro Mascagni, flanked by his librettists, Giovanni Targioni-Tozzetti and Guido Menasci

Libretti for operas, oratorios and cantatas in the 17th and 18th centuries were generally written by someone other than the composer, often a well-known poet.

Pietro Trapassi, known as Metastasio (1698–1782), was one of the most highly regarded librettists in Europe. His libretti were set many times by many different composers. Another noted 18th-century librettist was Lorenzo Da Ponte. He wrote the libretti for three of Mozart's greatest operas, and for many other composers as well. Eugène Scribe was one of the most prolific librettists of the 19th century, providing the words for works by Meyerbeer (with whom he had a lasting collaboration), Auber, Bellini, Donizetti, Rossini and Verdi. The French writers' duo Henri Meilhac and Ludovic Halévy wrote many opera and operetta libretti for the likes of Jacques Offenbach, Jules Massenet and Georges Bizet. Arrigo Boito, who wrote libretti for, among others, Giuseppe Verdi and Amilcare Ponchielli, also composed two operas of his own.

The libretto is not always written before the music. Some composers, such as Mikhail Glinka, Alexander Serov, Rimsky-Korsakov, Puccini and Mascagni wrote passages of music without text and subsequently had the librettist add words to the vocal melody lines (this has often been the case with American popular song and musicals in the 20th century, as with Richard Rodgers and Lorenz Hart's collaboration, although with the later team of Rodgers and Hammerstein the lyrics were generally written first, which was Rodgers' preferred modus operandi).

Some composers wrote their own libretti. Richard Wagner is perhaps most famous in this regard, with his transformations of Germanic legends and events into epic subjects for his operas and music dramas. Hector Berlioz, too, wrote the libretti for two of his best-known works, La damnation de Faust and Les Troyens. Alban Berg adapted Georg Büchner's play Woyzeck for the libretto of Wozzeck.

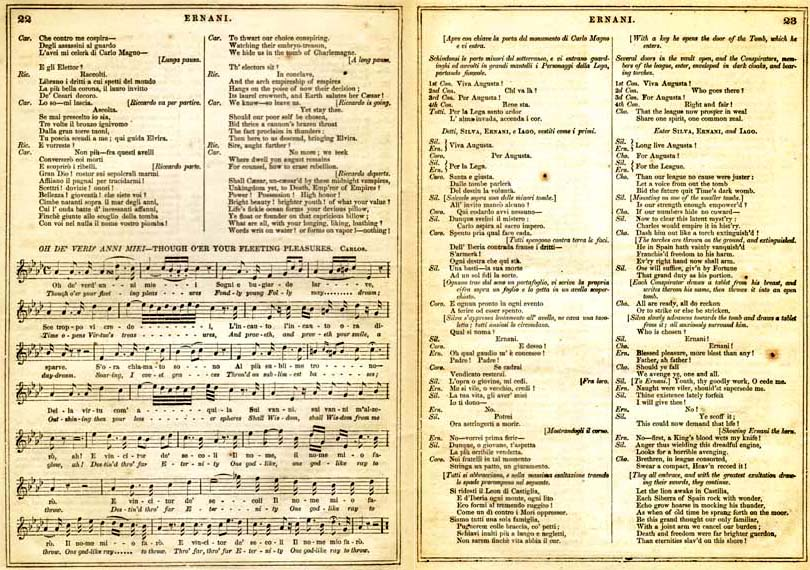
Pages from an 1859 libretto for Ernani, with the original Italian lyrics, English translation and musical notation for one of the arias

Sometimes the libretto is written in close collaboration with the composer; this can involve adaptation, as was the case with Rimsky-Korsakov and his librettist Vladimir Belsky, or an entirely original work. In the case of musicals, the music, the lyrics and the "book" (i.e., the spoken dialogue and the stage directions) may each have its own author. Thus, a musical such as Fiddler on the Roof has a composer (Jerry Bock), a lyricist (Sheldon Harnick) and the writer of the "book" (Joseph Stein). In rare cases, the composer writes everything except the dance arrangements – music, lyrics and libretto, as Lionel Bart did for Oliver!.

Other matters in the process of developing a libretto parallel those of spoken dramas for stage or screen. There are the preliminary steps of selecting or suggesting a subject and developing a sketch of the action in the form of a scenario, as well as revisions that might come about when the work is in production, as with out-of-town tryouts for Broadway musicals, or changes made for a specific local audience. A famous case of the latter is Wagner's 1861 revision of the original 1845 Dresden version of his opera Tannhäuser for Paris.

== Literary characteristics ==
The opera libretto from its inception (c. 1600) was written in verse, and this continued well into the 19th century, although genres of musical theatre with spoken dialogue have typically alternated verse in the musical numbers with spoken prose. Since the late 19th century some opera composers have written music to prose or free verse libretti. Much of the recitatives of George Gershwin's opera Porgy and Bess, for instance, are merely DuBose and Dorothy Heyward's play Porgy set to music as written – in prose – with the lyrics of the arias, duets, trios and choruses written in verse.

The libretto of a musical, on the other hand, is almost always written in prose (except for the song lyrics). The libretto of a musical, if the musical is adapted from a play (or even a novel), may even borrow their source's original dialogue liberally – much as Oklahoma! used dialogue from Lynn Riggs's Green Grow the Lilacs, Carousel used dialogue from Ferenc Molnár's Liliom, My Fair Lady took most of its dialogue word-for-word from George Bernard Shaw's Pygmalion, Man of La Mancha was adapted from the 1959 television play I, Don Quixote, which supplied most of the dialogue, and the 1954 musical version of Peter Pan used J. M. Barrie's dialogue. Even the musical Show Boat, which is greatly different from the Edna Ferber novel from which it was adapted, uses some of Ferber's original dialogue, notably during the miscegenation scene. And Lionel Bart's Oliver! uses chunks of dialogue from Charles Dickens's novel Oliver Twist, although it bills itself as a "free adaptation" of the novel.

== Language and translation ==
Henry Purcell (1659–1695), whose operas were written to English libretti

As the originating language of opera, Italian dominated that genre in Europe (except in France) well through the 18th century, and even into the next century in Russia, for example, when the Italian opera troupe in Saint Petersburg was challenged by the emerging native Russian repertory. Significant exceptions before 1800 can be found in Purcell's works, Handel's first operas, ballad opera and Singspiel of the 18th century, etc.

Just as with literature and song, the libretto has its share of problems and challenges with translation. In the past (and even today), foreign musical stage works with spoken dialogue, especially comedies, were sometimes performed with the sung portions in the original language and the spoken dialogue in the vernacular. The effects of leaving lyrics untranslated depend on the piece. A man like Louis Durdilly would translate the whole libretto, dialogues and airs, into French: Così fan tutte became Ainsi font toutes, ou la Fidélité des femmes, and instead of Ferrando singing "Un' aura amorosa" French-speaking audiences were treated to Fernand singing "Ma belle est fidèle autant qu'elle est belle".

Many musicals, such as the old Betty Grable – Don Ameche – Carmen Miranda vehicles, are largely unaffected, but this practice is especially misleading in translations of musicals like Show Boat, The Wizard of Oz, My Fair Lady or Carousel, in which the lyrics to the songs and the spoken text are often or always closely integrated, and the lyrics serve to further the plot. Availability of printed or projected translations today makes singing in the original language more practical, although one cannot discount the desire to hear a sung drama in one's own language.

The Spanish words libretista (playwright, script writer or screenwriter) and libreto (script or screen play), which are used in the Hispanic TV and cinema industry, derived their meanings from the original operatic sense.

== Status ==
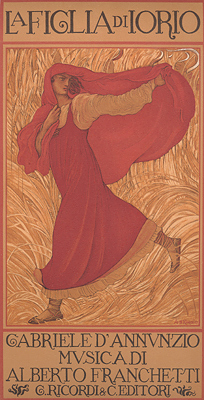
Poster for La figlia di Iorio where the librettist, Gabriele D'Annunzio, is given top billing

Librettists have historically received less prominent credit than the composer. In some 17th-century operas still being performed, the name of the librettist was not even recorded. As the printing of libretti for sale at performances became more common, these records often survive better than music left in manuscript. But even in late 18th century London, reviews rarely mentioned the name of the librettist, as Lorenzo Da Ponte lamented in his memoirs.

By the 20th century some librettists became recognised as part of famous collaborations, as with Gilbert and Sullivan or Rodgers and Hammerstein. Today the composer (past or present) of the musical score to an opera or operetta is usually given top billing for the completed work, and the writer of the lyrics relegated to second place or a mere footnote, a notable exception being Gertrude Stein, who received top billing for Four Saints in Three Acts. Another exception was Alberto Franchetti's 1906 opera La figlia di Iorio which was a close rendering of a highly successful play by its librettist, Gabriele D'Annunzio, a celebrated Italian poet, novelist and dramatist of the day. In some cases, the operatic adaptation has become more famous than the literary text on which it was based, as with Claude Debussy's Pelléas et Mélisande after a play by Maurice Maeterlinck.

The question of which is more important in opera – the music or the words – has been debated over time, and forms the basis of at least two operas, Richard Strauss's Capriccio and Antonio Salieri's Prima la musica e poi le parole.

== Publication ==
Libretti have been made available in several formats, some more nearly complete than others. The text – i.e., the spoken dialogue, song lyrics and stage directions, as applicable – is commonly published separately from the music (such a booklet is usually included with sound recordings of most operas). Sometimes (particularly for operas in the public domain) this format is supplemented with melodic excerpts of musical notation for important numbers.

Printed scores for operas naturally contain the entire libretto, although there can exist significant differences between the score and the separately printed text. More often than not, this involves the extra repetition of words or phrases from the libretto in the actual score. For example, in the aria "Nessun dorma" from Puccini's Turandot, the final lines in the libretto are "Tramontate, stelle! All'alba, vincerò!" (Fade, you stars! At dawn, I will win!). However, in the score they are sung as "Tramontate, stelle! Tramontate, stelle! All'alba, vincerò! Vincerò! Vincerò!".

Because the modern musical tends to be published in two separate but intersecting formats (i.e., the book and lyrics, with all the words, and the piano-vocal score, with all the musical material, including some spoken cues), both are needed in order to make a thorough reading of an entire show.

== See also ==
- List of opera librettists
