= Umberto Giordano =

Italian opera composer

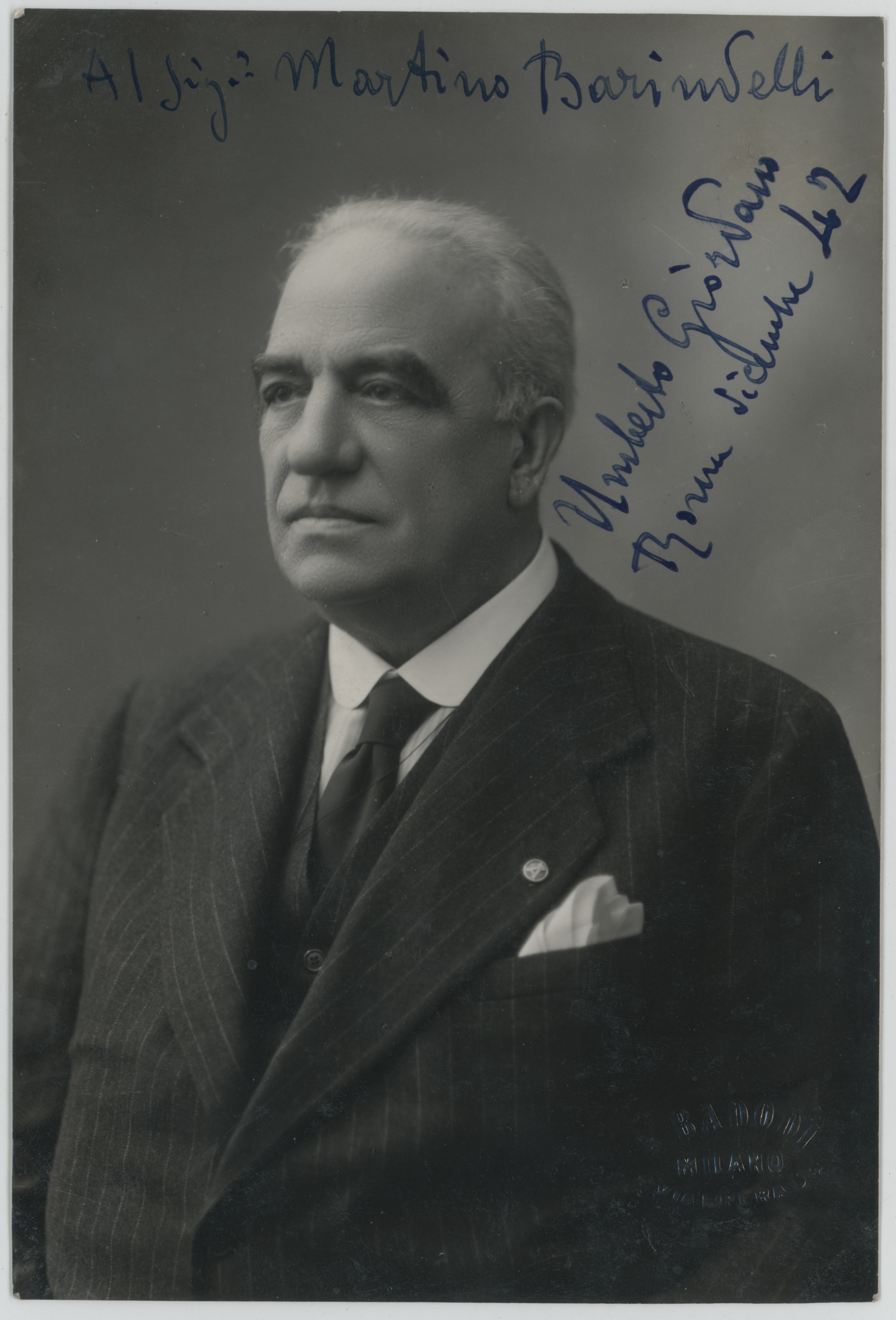
- Umberto Giordano (photo with dedication from 1942)
- Born: 28 August 1867; Foggia, Apulia, Italy
- Died: 12 November 1948 (aged 81); Milan, Italy
- Occupation: Composer

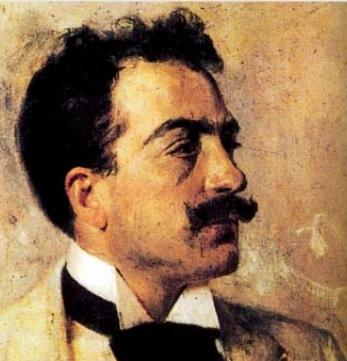
Umberto Giordano (1896) by Gaetano Esposito

Umberto Menotti Maria Giordano (28 August 1867 – 12 November 1948) was an Italian composer, mainly of operas. His best-known work in that genre was Andrea Chenier (1896).

He was born in Foggia in Apulia, southern Italy, and studied under Paolo Serrao at the Conservatoire of Naples. His first opera, Marina, was written for a competition promoted by the music publishers Casa Sonzogno for the best one-act opera, remembered today because it marked the beginning of Italian verismo. The winner was Mascagni's Cavalleria rusticana. Giordano, the youngest contestant, was placed sixth among seventy-three entries with his Marina, a work which generated enough interest for Sonzogno to commission the staging of an opera based on it in the 1891–92 season.

The result was Mala vita, a gritty verismo opera about a labourer who vows to reform a prostitute if he is cured of his tuberculosis. This work caused something of a scandal when performed at the Teatro Argentina, Rome, in February 1892. It played successfully in Vienna, Prague and Berlin and was re-written as Il Voto a few years later, in an attempt to raise interest in the work again.

Giordano tried a more romantic topic with his next opera, Regina Diaz, with a libretto by Giovanni Targioni-Tozzetti and Guido Menasci (1894), but this was a failure, taken off the stage after just two performances.

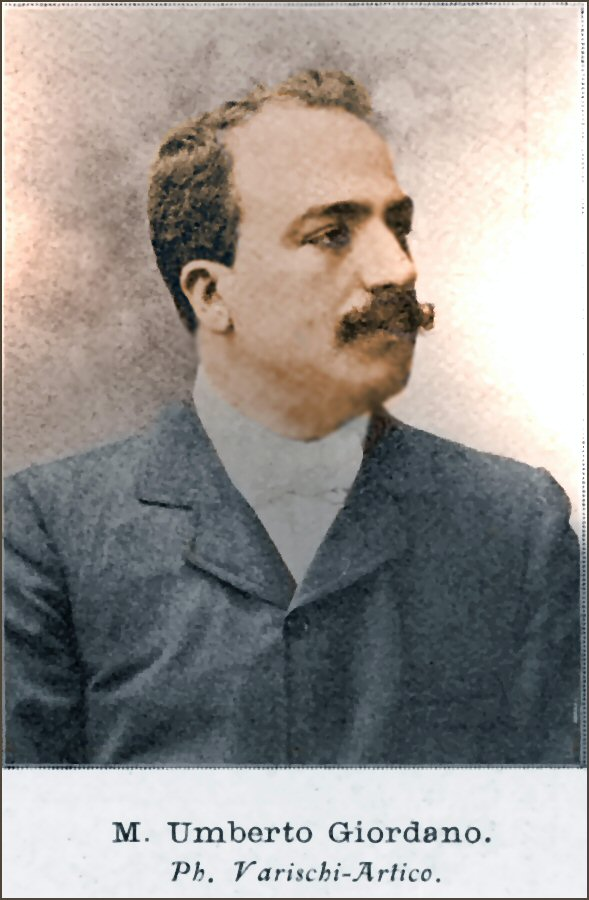
Umberto Giordano, 1905

Giordano then moved to Milan and returned to verismo with his best-known work, Andrea Chénier (1896), based on the life of the French poet André Chénier. Fedora (1898), based on Victorien Sardou's play, featured the rising young tenor Enrico Caruso. It was also a success and is still performed today. His later works are much less known, but occasionally revived and in the case of La cena delle beffe (based on the play of the same title by Sem Benelli) recognised by musicologists and critics with some respect. He died in Milan at the age of 81.

The most important theater in his home town of Foggia has been dedicated to Umberto Giordano. A square in Foggia is also named after him and contains several statues representing his most famous works.

== Operas ==
- Marina (1888)
- Mala vita (21 February 1892, Teatro Argentina, Rome)
- Regina Diaz (5 March 1894, Teatro Mercadante, Naples)
- Andrea Chénier (28 March 1896, Teatro alla Scala, Milan)
- Fedora (17 November 1898, Teatro Lirico, Milan)
- Il Voto (revision of Mala Vita) (6 September 1902, Teatro Bellini, Naples)
- Siberia (19 December 1903, Teatro alla Scala, Milan, rev. 1927)
- Marcella (9 November 1907, Teatro Lirico, Milan)
- Mese mariano (17 March 1910, Teatro Massimo, Palermo)
- Madame Sans-Gêne (25 January 1915, Metropolitan Opera, New York)
- Giove a Pompei (6 July 1921, Teatro La Pariola, Rome)
- La cena delle beffe (20 December 1924, Teatro alla Scala, Milan)
- Il re (12 January 1929, Teatro alla Scala, Milan)
- La festa del Nilo (incomplete)
