= Mala vita =

Opera by Umberto Giordano with libretto by Nicola Daspuro

- Opera by Umberto Giordano
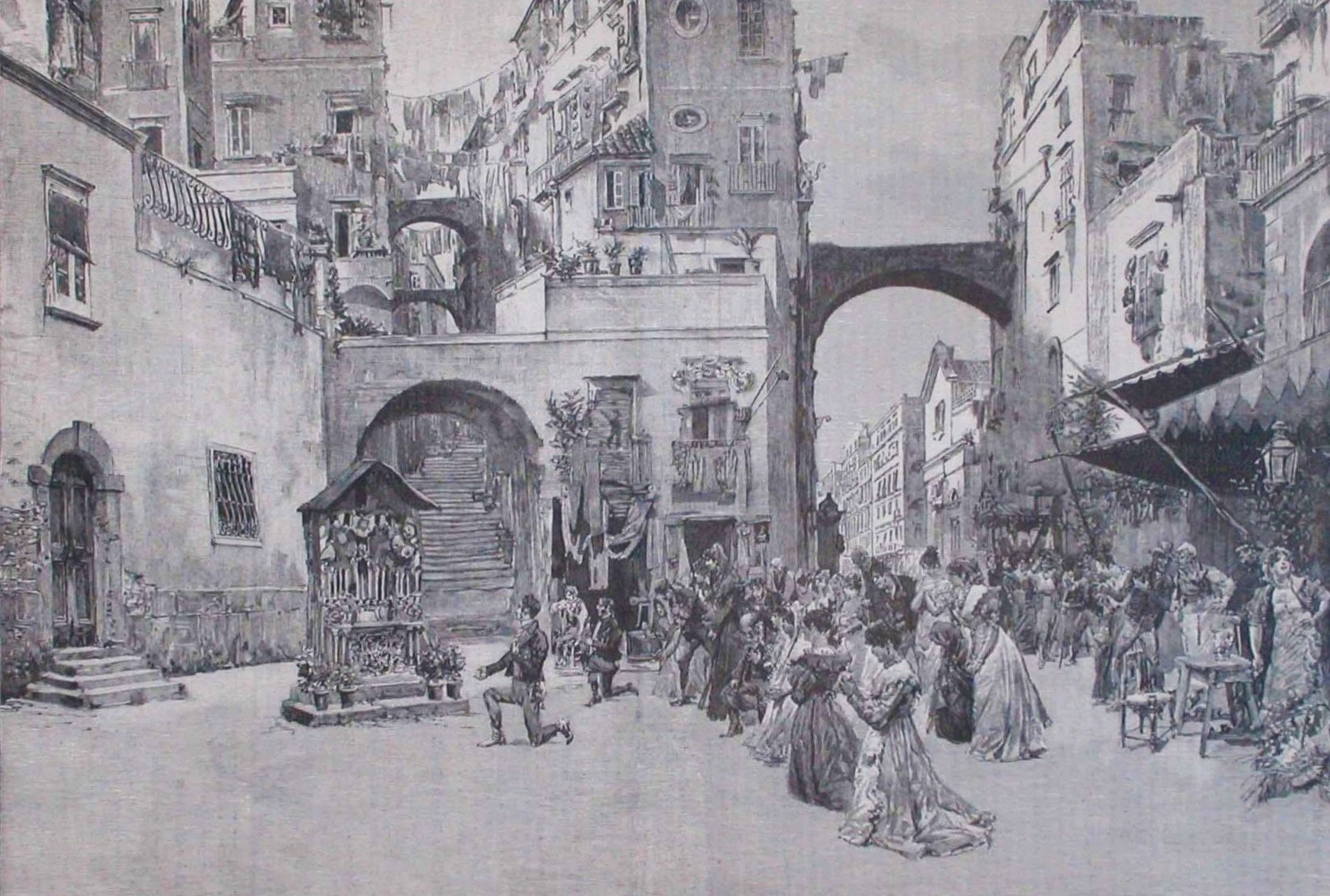
- Stage scene from Act 1 of the April 1892 performance at the Teatro San Carlo
- Librettist: Nicola Daspuro
- Language: Italian
- Based on: the play Mala vita by Salvatore Di Giacomo and Goffredo Cognetti
- Premiere: 21 February 1892; Teatro Argentina, Rome

Mala vita (Wretched Life) is an opera in three acts composed by Umberto Giordano to a libretto by Nicola Daspuro adapted from Salvatore Di Giacomo's and Goffredo Cognetti's verismo play of the same name. Giordano's first full-length opera, Mala vita premiered on 21 February 1892 at the Teatro Argentina. It was subsequently performed in Naples, Vienna, Berlin and Milan, and various Italian cities over the next two years. In 1897 a considerably re-worked and revised version under the title Il voto (The Vow) premiered in Milan. Within a few years, both versions had disappeared from the repertoire. Amongst its rare modern revivals was the 2002 performance at the Teatro Umberto Giordano in Foggia which was recorded live and released on the Bongiovanni label.

Set in a slum neighborhood of Naples during the early 19th century, the opera's story (and that of the play on which it is based) revolves around a love triangle between Vito, a dyer afflicted with tuberculosis; Cristina, a prostitute whom Vito has vowed to marry in return for God curing him of his disease; and Amalia, Vito's mistress but married to Annetiello, a hard-drinking habitué of the brothel where Cristina worked. The action unfolds amidst the neighborhood's preparations for the Piedigrotta festival.

== Background ==
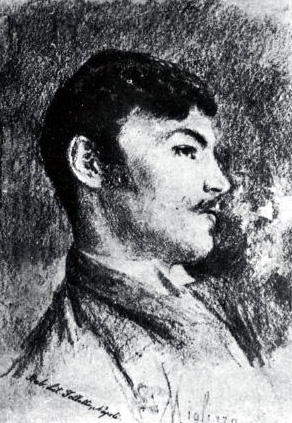
Salvatore Di Giacomo, on whose play and short story the libretto was based

Mala vita was Giordano's first full-length opera but owes its existence to his earlier Marina, a one-act opera that he had composed while still a student at the Conservatory of San Pietro a Majella in Naples. In July 1888 the Milanese music publisher Edoardo Sonzogno had announced a competition open to all young Italian composers who had not yet had an opera performed on stage. They were invited to submit a one-act opera that would be judged by a jury of five prominent Italian critics and composers. The best three would be staged in Rome at Sonzogno's expense. Giordano submitted Marina. When the winners were announced in March 1890, the three chosen from the 72 entries were Niccola Spinelli's Labilia, Vincenzo Ferroni's Rudello, and Mascagni's Cavalleria rusticana, with Cavalleria awarded the First Prize. However, Marina received one of the 13 "honourable mentions" and impressed. Amintore Galli, Sonzogno's music advisor, convinced the publisher to offer a commission to the young Giordano for a full-length opera.

The huge success of Cavalleria rusticana (based on the verismo play of the same name by Giovanni Verga) led to the choice of a similar subject for Giordano's commission—Salvatore Di Giacomo and Goffredo Cognetti's successful 1888 play Mala vita. The play, set in the slums of Naples amidst preparations for the Piedigrotta festival, had in turn been based on Di Giacomo's short story Il voto. Sonzogno hired Nicola Daspuro to adapt the work for the opera stage. Daspuro, a giornalist and librettist, was Sonzogno's representative in Naples and had written the libretto for Mascagni's L'amico Fritz which premiered in 1891. His libretto for Mala Vita, which converted the play's Neapolitan dialect prose into Italian verse, nevertheless remained very faithful to the original, including its metaphors and idioms and its three-act structure. Only some material from the play's first act was omitted for the opera in order to compress the action. Despite the three-act structure the opera has a running time of only 74 minutes, less than many performances of Mascagni's one-act Cavalleria rusticana.

Giordano's score makes ample use of the Neapolitan language and the idioms of Neapolitan vernacular music, seen most prominently in three set pieces of the final act: Vito's serenade "Canzon d'amor", a tarantella danced by the women as they are about to depart for the Piedigrotta festival, and Annetiello's proposed new song for the festival, "Ce sta, ce sta nu mutto ca dice accussì". The latter is sung in Neapolitan language to lyrics written by Di Giacomo expressly for the opera.

== Performance history ==
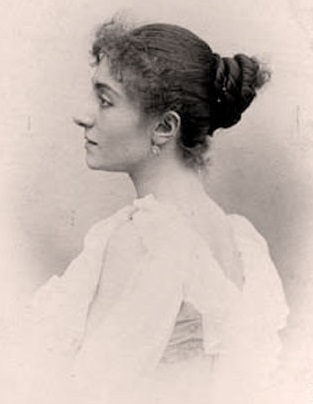
Gemma Bellincioni, who created the role of Cristina, and sang it in most of the opera's performances between 1892 and 1893

Mala vita premiered to great success on 21 February 1892 at the Teatro Argentina with Roberto Stagno as Vito and Gemma Bellincioni as Cristina. Giordano and the cast were called back to the stage for 24 curtain calls. The opera's next stop was the Teatro San Carlo in Naples with the same cast. The Naples performance on 26 April 1892 was a fiasco, booed and jeered by the audience and attacked by the critics the following day. The journalist Eugenio Sacerdoti lamented that he could barely hear the music because "from the beginning, the San Carlo was like a kennel of barking dogs." The reaction stemmed partly from outrage that such a sordid story set entirely in a slum was appearing on the hallowed stage of the city's most important opera house. Roberto Bracco wrote in the Corriere di Napoli that he regretted having witnessed Bellincioni and Stagno singing amidst "the garbage of the alleys" and "the prisons of sinful womanhood" (i.e. brothels). However, according to Matteo Sansone, there was also outrage that the opera's morally dubious characters and the squalid alleys in which they lived were presented as typical of Naples. As a precaution, Daspuro had explicitly set the libretto in 1810, 80 years before both the premiere and the original setting of Di Giacomo's play, but the opera was performed in costumes contemporary to the 1890s.

Mala vita received a much warmer reception from the audience in Vienna when it was presented the following September at the International Exhibition of Music and Theatre, along with other operas by Sonzogno's composers, including Cavalleria rusticana, L'amico Fritz, and Pagliacci. The German critic, Eduard Hanslick, who had seen the Vienna performance wrote:

In its merciless truthfulness to life Mala vita is both gripping and revolting at the same time, like most of these realistic pieces. The music of Maestro Giordano makes its effects through the rough-hewn ability to achieve a tone appropriate to the situation, and now and again by means of a gentler passage, as for example in Cristina's first entry. His sense of drama is stronger than his musical talent, his temperament stronger than his artistry.

The opera was revived in Vienna the following year at Theater an der Wien. It was staged in Berlin at the Krolloper in December 1892 (sung in German under the title Das Gelübde) and in Prague. It was also performed in several Italian cities between 1892 and 1893, including Milan (Teatro Dal Verme), Bologna (Teatro Brunetti), and Trieste (Politeama Rossetti).

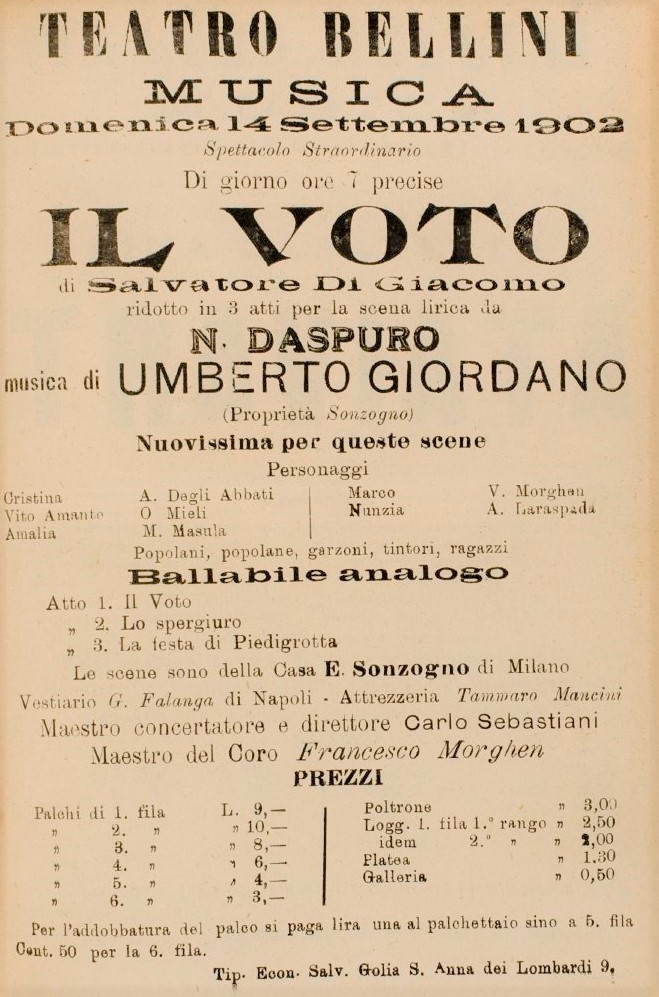
Poster advertising a 1902 performance of Il voto, the revised version of Mala vita

After 1893, Malavita disappeared from the opera stage. However, Giordano decided to attempt a re-working of the opera after his triumph with Andrea Chenier in 1896. With the help of Daspuro, Giordano revised the libretto in 1894 and sought to tone down the gritty verismo features of the original in the hope of making it more acceptable to Italian audiences. The setting was changed to Arenaccia, a residential area at the foot of the green hills surrounding Naples. The brothel disappeared, and Cristina was characterized not as a "fallen woman" but as a "betrayed woman" with an unspecified tragic experience in her past. The ending was also changed. Instead of returning to the brothel and pounding on its door, Cristina throws herself into a river. The debauched character Annetiello was eliminated. The revised work, re-titled Il voto, premiered on 10 November 1897 at the Teatro Lirico in Milan with Enrico Caruso as Vito and Rosina Storchio as Cristina. Neither the audiences nor the critics were impressed. Alfredo Colombani wrote in the Corriere della sera:

Now nothing hurts any more, that is true, but at the same time nothing interests or moves any more.

Il voto fared no better than its predecessor. After a few sporadic performances, including a run at the Teatro Bellini in Naples in 1902 with Armanda Degli Abbati as Cristina, it too disappeared from the repertoire. Amongst the rare modern revivals of the original Mala vita was a December 2002 production at the Teatro Umberto Giordano in Foggia (Giordano's native city). The performance was recorded live and released on the Bongiovanni label the following year.

== Roles ==
Role	Voice type	Premiere cast, 21 February 1892 (Conductor: Vittorio Podesti)
Vito, a dyer afflicted with tuberculosis	tenor	Roberto Stagno
Annetiello, a coachman	baritone	Ottorino Beltrami
Cristina, a prostitute	soprano	Gemma Bellincioni
Amalia, Annetiello's wife and Vito's mistress	mezzo-soprano	Emma Leonardi
Marco, a barber	basso cantante	Francesco Nicoletti
Nunzia, a hairdresser	mezzo-soprano	Giulia Sporeni
Working-class Neapolitan men, women, and children

== Synopsis ==
Setting: The slums of the Basso Porto quarter of Naples in 1810, a few days before the start of the Piedigrotta festival

Act 1

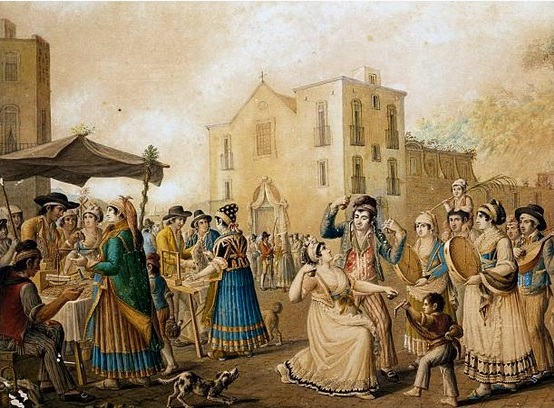
An 1813 depiction of the Piedigrotta festival

A crowd of people has gathered in the square outside Vito's dyeing workshop. The hairdresser Nunzia tells the crowd that Vito, who has tuberculosis, has suffered another attack. The barber Marco and the crowd comment that Vito's illness is God's punishment for his affair with Annetiello's wife, Amalia. Vito, coughing blood into his handkerchief, is led into the square by his friends. The crowd goes silent. He says that he wishes he could die, but Nunzia suggests that he try praying for a cure. He kneels before a shrine to the crucifix in the square and sings an impassioned prayer, "O Gesù mio...". He begs for God's forgiveness and healing and vows that in return he will marry a "fallen women" and save her from a life of sin. As the crowd disperses, Amalia, who has heard the prayer confronts Vito and demands an explanation. He refuses to answer her and goes back into his workshop.

Annetiello arrives, somewhat drunk and apparently unaware of his wife's affair with Vito, although it is common knowledge in the neighbourhood. He asks Marco if the story about Vito's vow is true. Marco confirms the story. Annetiello is momentarily nonplussed but then sings a paean to the approaching Piedigrotta festival, joined by the boys and men in the square, "Tutto è già pronto". He then goes into the tavern to resume his drinking. Vito returns to the square and is talking to Marco when a flower is thrown from the window of a brothel and lands at Vito's feet. Cristina, a prostitute from the brothel, comes into the square to draw water from the well. Vito asks her if she had thrown the flower and asks her for a drink of water. She lets him drink from the bottle she has filled but then starts to leave. Vito asks her name. She tells him, but tries to leave again. Taking her hand, Vito tells her that she is beautiful and asks her about her life. Cristina tells him that she has often dreamt that a man would fall in love with her and rescue her from her sordid life.

To Cristina's joy, Vito tells her that he is the man who will rescue her. Annetiello comes out of the tavern, now even more drunk. He mocks Vito and makes advances to Cristina whom he has recognised from his visits to the brothel. Vito pushes him away and re-affirms to the distraught Cristina that he will marry her. Marco, Annetiello, and the crowd pronounce Vito a saint for his generosity to a fallen woman. Cristina tells Vito that she adores him and will be his slave.

Act 2

Amalia is inside her house sewing and anxiously glancing out the window as she awaits a visit from Nunzia. When Nunzia arrives, Amalia asks her if the rumor of Vito and Cristina's impending marriage is true. Nunzia replies that it seems the marriage will go ahead. Amalia then asks Nunzia to bring Cristina to her. Annetiello appears with his friends. He teases Nunzia and tries unsuccessfully to stop her from leaving. He then fills his friends' glasses with wine and they all sing a brindisi, "Le mogli, in genere, son capricciose". After harsh words from Amalia, his friends lead Annetiello outside.

When Nunzia returns with Cristina, Amalia tells her that she too is passionately in love with Vito and her happiness cannot last. Amalia pleads with Cristina to call off the marriage, offers her money, and finally threatens her with a knife. However, Cristina remains resolute. Nunzia convinces Amalia to drop the knife and begs her to calm down.

After Nunzia and Cristina leave, Vito arrives at the house. He tells Amalia to leave Cristina alone and, at first, refuses to listen to her pleas for him to resume their love affair. Outside, a violent thunderstorm begins. Amalia throws herself into Vito's arms, and he can no longer resist her. As lightning flashes, Cristina who is still outside the house, sees Vito and Amalia embracing through the window and cries out "O Vito! Vito!" Amalia closes the shutters in her face.

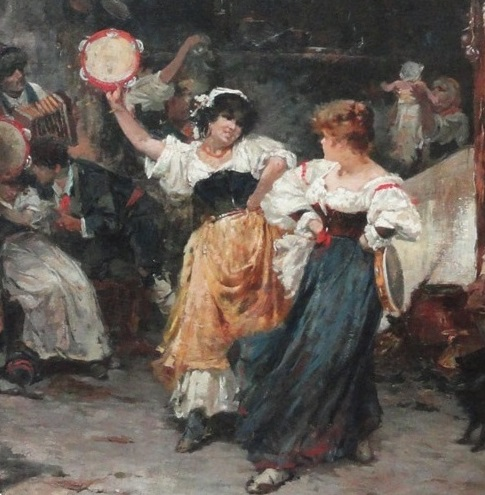
Bernardelli's Tarantella, 1886

Act 3

On the day of the Piedigrotta festival, the square outside Vito's workshop is filled with people. Vito sings a love song, "Canzon d'amor—che l'ala d'or" The women waiting to depart for the festival sing of their hopes of falling in love there and then dance a tarantella. More gaily dressed people arrive led by Annetiello who sings in praise of eating and drinking, "Ce sta, ce sta nu mutto ca dice accussì". (Note: Unlike the rest of the libretto, this song is in Neapolitan dialect. Di Giacomo wrote the lyrics expressly for the opera.) He then leads them off to the festival leaving Vito alone in the square.

Vito is shutting up his workshop when Cristina approaches him and asks if he still loves her. He cruelly replies that she knows all about love and then points to the brothel. Cristina breaks down in tears. Vito tells her that while he feels sorry for her, he cannot leave Amalia. The bonds of their love have proved too strong. Amalia appears, elegantly dressed for the festival, and tells Vito that the coach she has ordered will arrive shortly. Cristina pleads with Vito one last time to remember his vow and not abandon her. Although distressed by her tears, Vito tells Cristina that he cannot change his ways and leaves with Amalia.

Now alone and standing before the shrine where Vito had made his vow, Cristina sings of her grief, how she had longed for someone to rescue her from her sordid life, but in the end, God had refused her wish, "Lascia quei cenci". Offstage, voices are heard singing Annetiello's song accompanied by guitars and mandolins. Cristina suddenly runs towards the brothel, pounds on the door, and then faints. The curtain falls.

== Recording ==
- Umberto Giordano: Mala vita – Maurizio Graziani (Vito), Massimo Simeoli (Annetiello), Paola Di Gregorio (Cristina), Maria Miccoli (Amalia), Antonio Rea (Marco), Tiziana Portoghese (Nunzia); Orchestra Lirico Sinfonica del Teatro della Capitanata; Coro Lirico Umberto Giordano di Foggia; Angelo Cavallaro (conductor). Recorded live at the Teatro Giordano, Foggia in December 2002. Label: Bongiovanni
