= Nicola Daspuro =

Italian writer, journalist, and librettist (1853–1941)

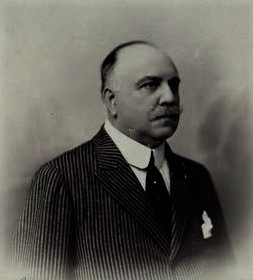
- Daspuro c.1910
- Born: 19 January 1853; Lecce, Kingdom of the Two Sicilies
- Died: 13 December 1941 (aged 88); Naples, Italy
- Other names: P. Suardon
- Occupations: writer; journalist; librettist

Nicola Daspuro (19 January 1853 – 13 December 1941) was an Italian writer, journalist, and librettist. Amongst his librettos were those for Macagni's L'amico Fritz and Giordano's Mala vita. Several of his librettos were written under the anagramatic pseudonym P. Suardon.

== Life and career ==
Daspuro was born in Lecce, the son of Domenico and Almerinda née Portoluzzo. He began his writing career in Lecce where two of his narrative pieces were published in 1881. He then settled in Naples where he was a correspondent for Il Secolo, Teatro illustrato, Gazzetta del Popolo, Commedia umana and Le Figaro, writing primarily on the theatrical and operatic life of the city. In 1884 Daspuro had written a biography of the Neapolitan revolutionary Masaniello published by Edoardo Sonzogno. He went on to form a close friendship with Sonzogno, whose chief business was music publishing, and acted as his agent and advisor for Naples and the south of Italy. Between 1891 and 1910 Daspuro also became known for his opera librettos, two of which had been commissioned by Sonzogno—L'amico Fritz and Mala vita.

Daspuro managed the Teatro Mercadante in Naples on Sonzogno's behalf for three years starting in December 1893. Prior to the December re-opening the theatre had been renovated and given a new facade paid for by Sonzogno and supervised by Daspuro. For the Sonzogno seasons at the Mercadante Daspuro had assembled a company of the most prominent singers of the day including Roberto Stagno, Francesco Tamagno, Gemma Bellincioni, and Adelina Stehle. The first seasons were so successful that they took business away from the grander Teatro San Carlo. Anna Stolzmann, who had the concession to produce operas and ballets at the San Carlo, was forced to declare bankruptcy in January 1895, and the theatre went dark. It re-opened three months later after the city of Naples accepted a proposal from Daspuro and Sonzogno to stage a season there which would include Mascagni's Ratcliff and Silvano.

In the autumn of 1894, Guglielmo Vergine, the teacher and agent of the young Enrico Caruso had asked Daspuro to audition his pupil for a role in the coming season at the Mercadante. Although the casts had been fully booked Daspuro gave Caruso an audition and was sufficiently impressed to offer him the chance to sing the tenor lead in one of the matinee performances of Mignon. However, overcome by nerves at the piano rehearsal, Caruso kept forgetting the words, could not keep to the tempi, and his voice repeatedly cracked on the high notes. Daspuro and the conductor Giovanni Zuccani cancelled his debut. Caruso and Vergine left the theatre in tears. Three years later, after Caruso was having considerable success performing in Salerno, Vergine contacted Daspuro again asking him to come hear how much his pupil had improved. Reluctantly, Daspuro consented to the journey from Naples to Salerno but wrote to Vergine, "Very well, Maestro, but if I find, instead of a divo, a dog, then poor you!" To avoid a similar debacle to the one at the Teatro Mercadante, Daspuro agreed sit in the audience at a performance of La Gioconda instead of making his presence known to Caruso. After the performance, Daspuro offered Caruso a contract for the upcoming season at the Teatro Lirico in Milan, which he was helping Sonzogno to manage. Despite Sonzogno's initial doubts, Caruso had great success there, appearing in the leading tenor roles of five operas, including Federico, in the world premiere of L'arlesiana in November 1897 and Loris in the world premiere of Fedora in November 1898. Daspuro remained in contact with Caruso throughout the singer's life and wrote an illustrated biography of him published by Sonzogno in 1938.

In the later years of his career, Daspuro moved away from the life of a theatrical impresario and journalist and became involved in a number of construction and urban development projects with the architect and engineer Giovan Battista Comencini. The most notable of these was the Central Funicular railway in Naples which opened in 1928. Daspuro died a wealthy man at his villa in the Campi Flegrei in 1941.

== Works ==
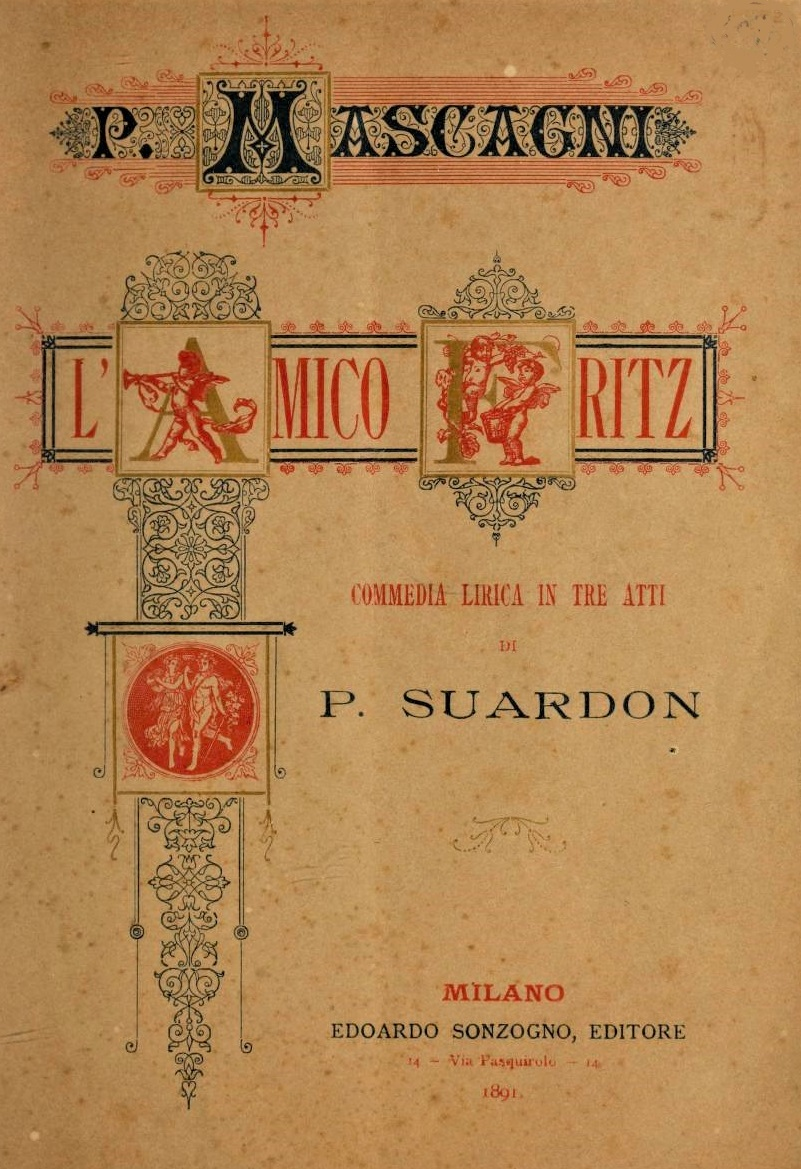
Cover of the libretto for L'amico Fritz published by Sonzogno in 1891

=== Opera librettos ===
- L'amico Fritz, under the pseudonym "P. Suardon", three acts, composed by Pietro Mascagni, premiered Teatro Costanzi, Rome, 31 October 1891
- Mala vita, three acts, composed by Umberto Giordano, premiered Teatro Argentina, Rome, 21 February 1892
- Il voto, three acts, composed by Umberto Giordano (an extensive revision of Mala vita), premiered Teatro Lirico, Milan, 10 November 1897
- Renata, composed by Oronzo Mario Scarano, three acts, premiered Theater des Westens, Berlin, 4 January 1901
- Nora, under the pseudonym "P. Suardon", three acts, composed by Gaetano Luporini, premiered Teatro del Giglio, Lucca, 7 September 1908
- Igor, under the pseudonym "P. Suardon", one act, composed by Massimino Perilli, premiered Teatro Mercadante, Naples, 7 December 1910

In 1892, Daspuro also wrote the libretto for Luigi Francesco Bianco's unperformed three-act opera Almansor. According to Daspuro's entry in the Dizionario Biografico degli Italiani, he published several other opera librettos, but it is unclear whether they were ever set by a composer:

- Hassan, three acts, co-written with Daspuro's friend and fellow journalist Federigo Verdinois, 1892 (Note: The Italian National Library system also holds an opera libretto by Daspuro and Verdinois published in the same year and by the same company (De Angelis-Bellisario) titled Elda.)
- Bito, three acts, c.1895
- La giacobina, three acts, 1940
- Orlof, two acts, 1940

=== Song lyrics ===
- "Vieni", set by Giuseppe Bozzelli and published in 1879 by Francesco Lucca. The song was dedicated to Elena Theodorini.
- "Almeno", set by Mario Pasquale Costa and published by the Società musicale napolitana in 1888

=== Books ===
- Masaniello (biography) published by Sonzogno in 1884
- Enrico Caruso (biography) published by Sonzogno in 1938
