= Luporini =

Luporini is an Italian surname. Notable people with the surname include:

- Gaetano Luporini (1865–1948), Italian composer
- Gaetano Giani Luporini (1936–2022), Italian composer, grandson of Gaetano
- Sandro Luporini (born 1930), Italian painter, lyricist and writer
