= A Santa Lucia =

A Santa Lucia is a two-act verismo Italian-language opera by Pierantonio Tasca to a libretto by Enrico Golisciani based on the Scene napolitane of Goffredo Cognetti. It was premiered at the Kroll Opera in Berlin on 16 November 1892 with Gemma Bellincioni and Roberto Stagno in the main roles. The title refers to the setting, the Borgo Santa Lucia historic waterfront district of Naples.

== Recording ==
A Santa Lucia - Iordanka Derilova, Rita Kapfhammer, Cornelia Marschall, Ulf Paulsen, Ray M. Wade, Opernchor des Anhaltisches Theater Dessau, Anhaltische Philharmonie Dessau, Markus L. Frank 1CD CPO 2019
