= Mario Basiola =

Italian opera singer

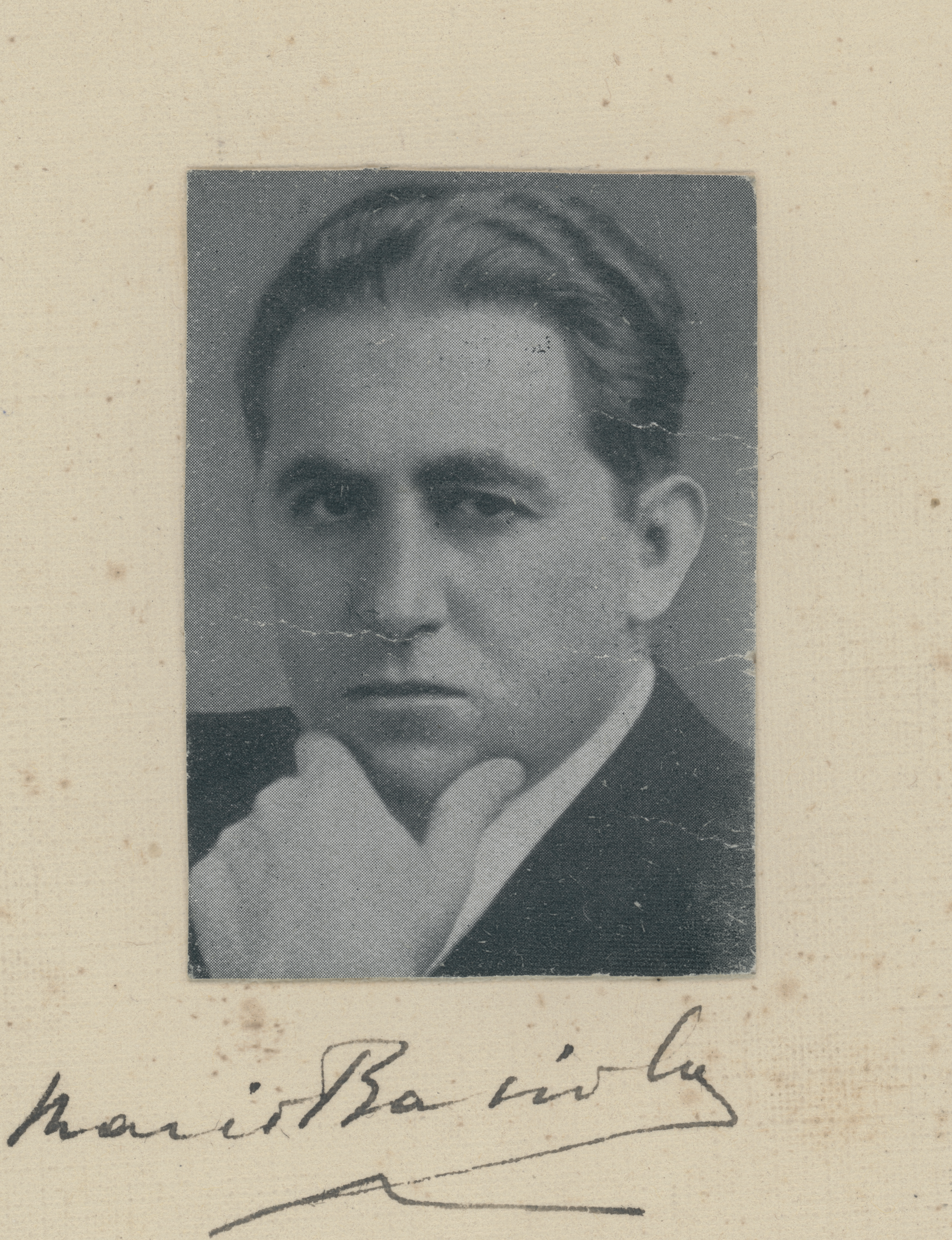
- Mario Basiola (photo with dedication)
- Occupation: opera singer

Mario Basiola (12 July 1892 – 3 January 1965) was an Italian operatic baritone.

== Early years and education ==
Mario Basiola was born in Annicco in the province of Cremona to Alessandro, an artisan basketweaver, and Marta Milanesi. He spent his youth mostly working in the fields, never receiving a proper school education. He began singing in church, but military service took him to Rome, where he remained as a soldier during World War I.

There he participated in a contest to enter the Accademia Nazionale di Santa Cecilia and out of sixty competitors, he was one of five chosen. He was placed with baritone Antonio Cotogni, one of the greatest representatives of the mid-to-late-19th century Italian vocal school. He studied with Cotogni from June 1915 to the latter's death in 1918, becoming one of his favorite students.

His study with Cotogni was crucial for his acquiring a technique and style that allowed him to portray the situations in the verismo literature without compromising his “vocal organization.” Basiola at times denounced the era in which he worked (especially in certain interpretive tastes), and did not display the tendency toward sensational and boisterous vocalism as much as some of his contemporaries. Instead he maintained the capacity to deal with singing (especially in the Verdi literature) with correctness and measure, malleable timbre and fluent sureness in the upper voice that made him “one of the few baritones of his generation capable of representing the true traditional Italian school.” This early training period was very profitable for him but also very difficult: when he was expelled from the Conservatory for “insufficient voice” caused by a bout of "physical wasting," Cotogni came to his aid again. Initially, Basiola's voice was not well defined because of its "amphibious" color that lay somewhere between tenor and baritone. When it settled into its high baritone, the young singer learned his roles “note for note, breath for breath, ... gesture for gesture from his revered teacher,” basing everything on Cotogni's principle of intentionality (itself fundamental in 19th century vocal schooling): in order to emit a good and correct sound, the singer should first imagine it, hear it within himself, and make every effort to realize this idealized sound with his own voice, thus avoiding intrusion of the sound into cavities that diminish or exclude the fundamental harmonics. In his first performances at Santa Cecilia, he sang the duets from La forza del destino and Don Carlo with tenor Giacomo Lauri-Volpi. In 1916 he sang his first wartime benefit concerts in and around Rome, including arias from Massenet's Hérodiade, Bizet's Les pêcheurs de perles, Mozart's Don Giovanni and others in the presence of Cotogni, who praised his student enthusiastically.

== Career ==
Mario Basiola as Figaro in Il barbiere di Siviglia

=== Debut and Italy ===
Basiola made his debut on June 20, 1918 in La traviata at the Teatro Morgana in Rome. In November he sang his first Barbiere di Siviglia, which earned him good reviews. In 1919 he toured the Italian provinces, essaying his first Rigoletto and Alfonso in La favorita. He was signed for Catalani's Loreley and Luporini's I dispetti amorosi at the Teatro del Giglio. In 1920, Emma Carelli signed him for Pagliacci (for which he was to sing a stunning Tonio in the 1934 complete His Master's Voice recording featuring Gigli as Canio) at the Teatro Verdi in Florence. Throughout the ensuing year he sang primarily in regional theaters in Italy, taking on the standard baritone repertory, ranging from Malatesta in Don Pasquale and Verdi roles like Don Carlo in Ernani, to veristic works like Fedora and La Wally. By 1922, he was being paired with stars like Elvira de Hidalgo and Toti Dal Monte. A brief tour took him to Egypt. He debuted at Port Said as Alfonso, a role that “exalted his legato singing, for which Cotogni had taught him all the subtlest nuances and even where to breathe in order to deliver such broad, sustained phrases.”

=== America ===
1923 was a very important year for Basiola: he was cast for a U.S. tour with the San Carlo Opera Company, headed by impresario Fortunato Gallo. He debuted on October 3 at New York's Century Theatre in Aida and Otello. Through 1925 he sang in all the major American theaters, mainly in Verdi roles but also (as arch-villain Barnaba) in La Gioconda, Tonio in Pagliacci (in which he was to make a stunning complete recording in 1934 for His Master's Voice back in Italy with the great Gigli as Canio) and Escamillo in Carmen, with robust success: critics praised his vocal sonority and homogeneity throughout all registers, with such a wide range and clarity of color as to compare it to a tenor's voice. In June 1924 Basiola sang at the Ravinia Festival, performing with Lauri-Volpi in Lucia di Lammermoor and Rigoletto. For the 1925-1926 season, renowned impresario Giulio Gatti-Casazza engaged him for the Metropolitan Opera in New York, where he remained until 1932. He debuted on November 11, 1925 in Aida alongside Elisabeth Rethberg and Giovanni Martinelli, under the direction of Tullio Serafin, followed by Madama Butterfly with Beniamino Gigli. His theatrical activity was very intense at the time, with almost no month in which he did not appear at the Metropolitan or other major U.S. theaters. Among his most notable performances from this first season at the Metropolitan Opera were a Faust with Feodor Chaliapin and a Gioconda (replacing Titta Ruffo) with Rosa Ponselle. In 1926 he essayed Alfio in Cavalleria rusticana (which became his most role at the Metropolitan), and the title role in Rigoletto with Marion Talley. In May 1926 he went to Cuba, and in July returned to the Ravinia Festival, where he sang in Montemezzi's L'amore dei tre re in addition to Don Pasquale. In the 1926–27 season, he debuted in Spontini's La vestale, then appeared in Lucia di Lammermoor and Il barbiere alongside Amelita Galli-Curci, and then again in I pagliacci.

Basiola's wife, soprano Caterina Gobbi.

On July 12, 1927, Basiola married the soprano Caterina Gobbi and returned to Italy for a short time. He returned to open the 1927–28 Metropolitan Opera season with La forza del destino. On April 9, 1928 his first child, daughter Marta Maria Rosa, was born and shortly afterward christened at St. Patrick's Cathedral, sponsored by Rosa Ponselle and the ambassador Emmanuele Grazzi. In the meantime, he never stopped learning new roles. Memorable was his debut in Meyerbeer's L'africana in Atlanta, which he subsequently repeated at the Metropolitan Opera. In 1929 he gained special acclaim with Ernani and Il trovatore, often alongside Lauri-Volpi. In December, he debuted in Respighi's La campana sommersa. His last performances at the Metropolitan (February 1932) were alongside Georges Thill in Faust and Lily Pons in Les contes d'Hoffmann. He also took part in the first American performance(s?) of Pizzetti's Fra Gherardo (March 21, 1929), Rimsky-Korsakov's Sadko (January 25, 1930), Lattuada's Le preziose ridicole (December 10, 1930) and Montemezzi's La notte di Zoraima (December 2, 1931).

His sojourn in America was important for him but did not bring with it guaranteed adulation, given the presence of such baritones as Titta Ruffo, Giuseppe De Luca and Antonio Scotti - competitors idolized by the American public. He was often used as a substitute or understudy for such better-known rivals, and for this he regretted not always being considered on a par with such eminent colleagues.

Back in Italy, Basiola returned to sing in the provinces, but soon became one of the most popular baritones, given certain qualities - possessed by few others - needed to interpret certain 19th-century repertory being revived in those years due to the shortage of successful new works, including triumphs in 1933 — alongside Giannina Arangi-Lombardi at the Teatro Carlo Felice in L’africana and at the Maggio Musicale Fiorentino in Bellini's I puritani with Lauri-Volpi, Mercedes Capsir and Ezio Pinza. After his debut at the San Carlo in Naples and a successful 1934 Otello with the Verona Philharmonic ("a proper, controlled Iago, drawing out the character without overdoing it”), Basiola celebrated the Ponchielli centenary in Cremona, interpreting Amenofi in Il figliuol prodigo. The following year for the centenary of Bellini's tragic early death in 1835, he performed as Ernesto in Il pirata in Rome and La straniera at La Scala.

He traveled to Poland, Spain and again to America, where on September 1, 1935 his second child, Mario (Tullio) Jr, was born, who was also destined to become a baritone like his father. In 1936, after performing Perosi's oratorio Il Natale, he sang alongside Tito Schipa in Cilea's L’arlesiana at La Scala, where, to give Basiola the opportunity to show off his sonorous high notes, the composer added the phrase "Bravi, ragazzi miei" to the third act.

=== Later career ===
Mario Basiola as Antonio in Linda di Chamounix, Teatro alla Scala, Milan, 1939-1940.

In these years Basiola's activity reached its maximum intensity, with debuts of even more new roles, performances with all the greatest Italian singers of the day, in all the major theaters of Italy. In 1939 he made two tours abroad, being invited to Cairo for Massenet's Thaïs and to Covent Garden in London for revivals of Tosca, Trovatore and Traviata. He can be heard on live recordings of the latter two, with Jussi Björling and Beniamino Gigli, respectively, as well as on a recording of an EIAR radio broadcast of the Leoncavallo rarity Edipo Re. The 1939–40 season was his last at La Scala, where he took part in a famous revival of Donizetti's Linda di Chamounix, the baritone role of old Antonio having been one of the most famous interpretations of Basiola's old teacher Cotogni. The start of World War II took him back to singing for wounded soldiers as he did in World War I early in his career.

After the war he gradually became less active, focusing mainly on provincial theaters. In July 1948 he joined a company for a long tour in Australia: despite some successes, the rest of the company was only mediocre, and Basiola was often the only name singled out for good review. Back in Milan, tired and partly disappointed, he opened a singing school with his wife, his most notable student being baritone Aldo Protti. He sang increasingly rarely in public, but in 1951 at Cremona he once again took on villainous Barnaba in La Gioconda, an opera of which he was very fond and which had been a staple of his repertory.

He died in Milan on January 3, 1965.

== Legacy ==
Historically Basiola's voice was located in a transitional, intermediate time between late 19th-century vocalism and verismo tastes, somewhat like Carlo Galeffi (also a student of Cotogni). While he lived and worked at a time when deformative tendencies were impinging on the interpretative forms of 19th-century repertoire, Basiola nurtured the legacy of his schooling: he was a high baritone, with a voice clear and free of the defects of the modern dramatic baritone, with its dark, opaque timbre acquired with artificiality and encumbrances in emission. Basiola also avoided the search for any easy effects that were outside of a purely vocal technical nature. Verismo vocalism, besides being antithetical to the search for “aristocratic” phrasing, tended to place the tessitura in the lower middle voice, causing other singers to forget the technical features that would allow them to dominate the high notes with ease, instead causing them to push in order to fatten the voice, which in turn weighed down its easy emission. Basiola, on the contrary, possessed a voluminous but also mellow voice, with great intensity of vibration throughout the entire gamut of sounds, an extensive range that allowed him to touch and sustain support high A-flat, and a tenor-like ring in the high notes. Basiola was also capable of the kind of mezza voce that comes from good technique in emission. This allowed him to alternate dramatic and incisive expressions with whispered sounds “a fior di labbra,” especially in the Donizetti and Bellini roles or the mournful pleadings of Verdi's baritone roles. Managing to resolve vocal difficulties without force and maintaining the soft suppleness of the voice gave him the opportunity to enrich the characters such as Tonio, Barnaba, Rigoletto, making them figures that weren't unilaterally gloomy and vindictive. His broad phrasing and the sonority of his voice also allowed him to create characters that were both noble and imposing. Over time Basiola had to make some concessions to verismo vocalism, and his incessant activity did bring about some cloudiness of the voice, but his technique and style made him much in demand, especially in works from the second half of the 19th century. What he could not entirely achieve was to put an unmistakably personal stamp on his interpretations. Nevertheless, Basiola was his immense technical and artistic value during his career and to modern historians of the voice and singing.

== Repertoire ==
Basiola's repertoire comprised nearly 70 roles.

Sortable table
Composer Surname	Composer	Opera/Oratorio	Role
Bellini	Vincenzo Bellini	I puritani	Riccardo
Bellini	Vincenzo Bellini	Il pirata	Ernesto
Bellini	Vincenzo Bellini	La straniera	Valdeburgo
Bizet	Georges Bizet	Carmen	Escamillo
Bizet	Georges Bizet	Les pêcheurs de perles	Zurga
Cassado	Joaquim Cassadó i Valls	Il Monaco nero	
Catalani	Alfredo Catalani	Dejanice	Dàrdano
Catalani	Alfredo Catalani	La Wally	Gellner
Catalani	Alfredo Catalani	Loreley	Hermann
Charpentier	Gustave Charpentier	Louise	Father
Cilea	Francesco Cilea	L'arlesiana	Baldassare
Donizetti	Gaetano Donizetti	Don Pasquale	Dr. Malatesta
Donizetti	Gaetano Donizetti	La favorita	Alfonso
Donizetti	Gaetano Donizetti	L'elisir d'amore	Belcore
Donizetti	Gaetano Donizetti	Linda di Chamounix	Antonio
Donizetti	Gaetano Donizetti	Lucia di Lammermoor	Enrico
Gandino	Adolfo Gandino	Imelda	Brandino
Giordano	Umberto Giordano	Andrea Chenier	Carlo Gérard
Giordano	Umberto Giordano	Fedora	De Siriex
Gluck	Christoph Willibald Gluck	Alceste	High Priest of Apollo
Gomes	Antônio Carlos Gomes	Il Guarany	Gonzales
Gounod	Charles Gounod	Faust	Valentin
Lattuada	Felice Lattuada	Le preziose ridicole	Jodelet
Leoncavallo	Ruggero Leoncavallo	Edipo Re	Edipo
Leoncavallo	Ruggero Leoncavallo	I pagliacci	Silvio
Leoncavallo	Ruggero Leoncavallo	I pagliacci	Tonio
Leoni	Franco Leoni	L'oracolo	Cim-Fen
Luporini	Gaetano Luporini	I dispetti amorosi	Momi
Mascagni	Pietro Mascagni	Cavalleria Rusticana	Alfio
Massenet	Jules Massenet	Manon	Lescaut
Massenet	Jules Massenet	Thaïs	Anthanaël
Meyerbeer	Giacomo Meyerbeer	Dinorah	Hoël
Meyerbeer	Giacomo Meyerbeer	L'africana	Nelusko
Montemezzi	Italo Montemezzi	La nave	Sergio Gràtico
Montemezzi	Italo Montemezzi	La notte di Zoraima	Pedrito
Montemezzi	Italo Montemezzi	L'amore dei tre re	Manfredo
Offenbach	Jacques Offenbach	Les contes d'Hoffmann	Dappertutto
Perosi	Lorenzo Perosi	Il Natale del Redentor	Storico
Pizzetti	Ildebrando Pizzetti	Fra Gherardo	Il vescovo / Bishop
Ponchielli	Amilcare Ponchielli	Il figliuol prodigo	Amenofi
Ponchielli	Amilcare Ponchielli	La gioconda	Barnaba
Puccini	Giacomo Puccini	La bohème	Marcello
Puccini	Giacomo Puccini	Madama Butterfly	Sharpless
Puccini	Giacomo Puccini	Tosca	Scarpia
Puccini	Giacomo Puccini	Turandot	Ping
Respighi	Ottorino Respighi	Campana sommersa	Ondino/Nickelmann
Respighi	Ottorino Respighi	La fiamma	Basilio
Respighi	Ottorino Respighi	Lucrezia	Sesto Tarquinio
Respighi	Ottorino Respighi	Maria egiziaca	Abbate Zosimo/Pellegrino
Rimsky-Korsakov	Nikolai Rimsky-Korsakov	Sadko	Venetian Merchant
Rossini	Gioacchino Rossini	Guglielmo Tell	Guglielmo Tell
Rossini	Gioacchino Rossini	Il barbiere di Siviglia	Figaro
Saint-Saëns	Camille Saint-Saëns	Samson et Dalila	High Priest of Dagon
Spontini	Gaspare Spontini	La vestale	Cinna
Thomas	Ambroise Thomas	Mignon	Lothario
Verdi	Giuseppe Verdi	Aïda	Amonasro
Verdi	Giuseppe Verdi	Don Carlo	Rodrigo
Verdi	Giuseppe Verdi	Ernani	Don Carlo
Verdi	Giuseppe Verdi	Il trovatore	Conte Di Luna
Verdi	Giuseppe Verdi	La forza del destino	Don Carlo di Vargas
Verdi	Giuseppe Verdi	La traviata	Germont
Verdi	Giuseppe Verdi	Luisa Miller	Miller
Verdi	Giuseppe Verdi	Nabucco	Nabucco
Verdi	Giuseppe Verdi	Otello	Iago
Verdi	Giuseppe Verdi	Rigoletto	Rigoletto
Verdi	Giuseppe Verdi	Un ballo in maschera	Renato
