= Pierantonio Tasca =

Italian composer

Pierantonio Tasca (1858–1934) was an Italian opera composer. His first opera, Bianca, premiered in 1885, to a libretto by Enrico Golisciani. Eva Tetrazzini, elder sister of the famous Luisa Tetrazzini participated in the premiere.

His next operas, A Santa Lucia (1892) and Pergolesi (1898), had successful premieres in Berlin. The libretto for A Santa Lucia was written by Enrico Golisciani, based on the book Scene popolari napoletane (1889) by Goffredo Cognetti (Napoli 1855-Castiglioncello, Livorno 1943). The score was published by Galletti e Cocci (Florence) in 1892. Pergolesi was based on a libretto by Eugenio Chécchi (Livorno 1838 - Roma 1932).

In 1901, an operetta by Tasca called Studenti e sartine premiered in Tasca's hometown of Noto, in Sicily. Tasca presented the work using a pseudonym, "D'Anthony."

Tasca's next opera to be performed onstage was La lupa, with a libretto by Giovanni Verga. La lupa was published in the second decade of the 20th century, but had its premiere in Noto in 1932. Two additional operatic works composed by Tasca, La madre and Scongiuro, were never performed. Tasca also wrote a Messa da Requiem, a death elegy to Edmondo De Amicis, as well as symphonic and chamber music.
