= Lamberto Landi =

Italian composer and conductor

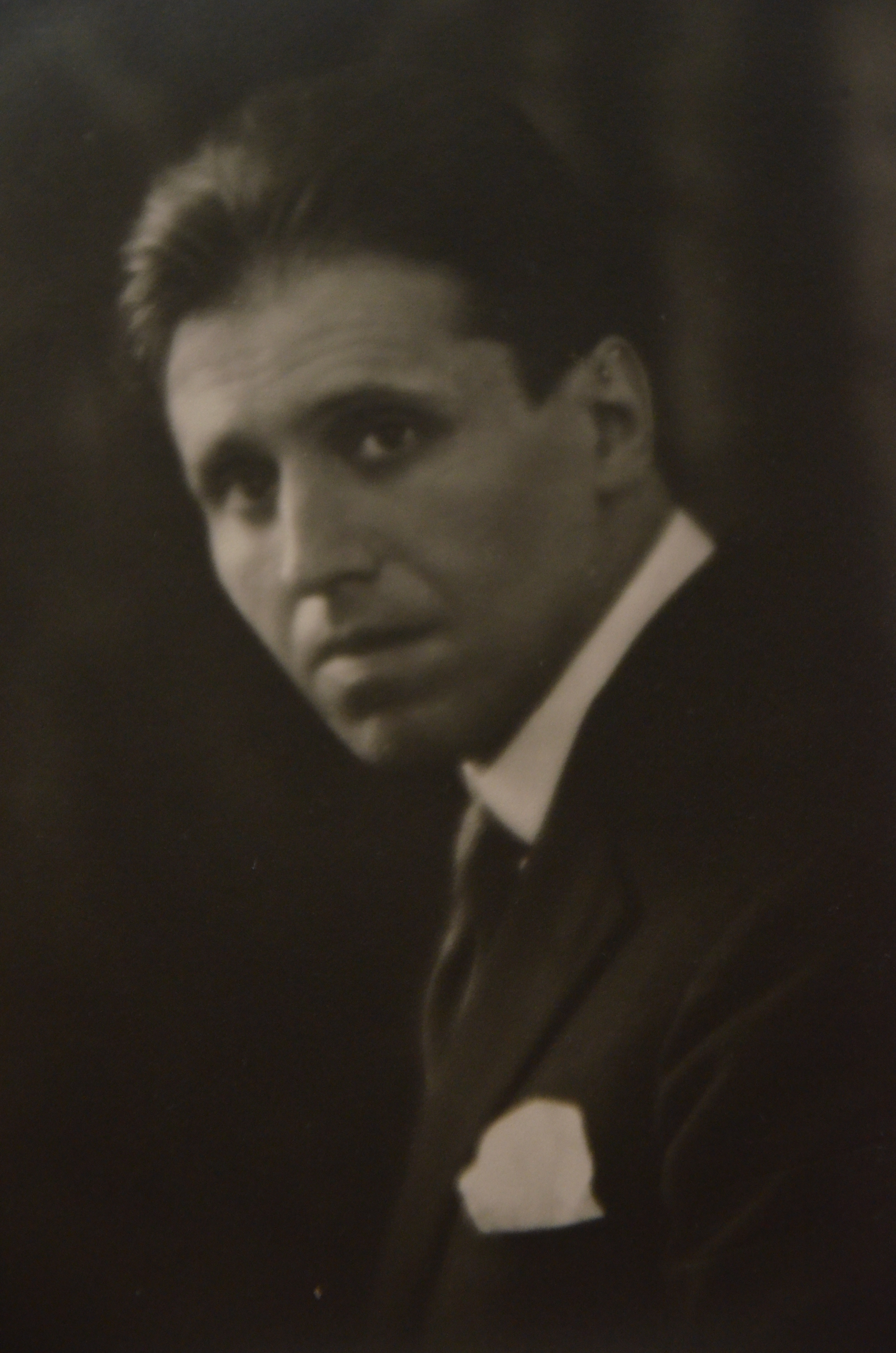
- Born: September 2, 1882
- Died: July 6, 1950 (aged 67)
- Occupations: Composer and conductor

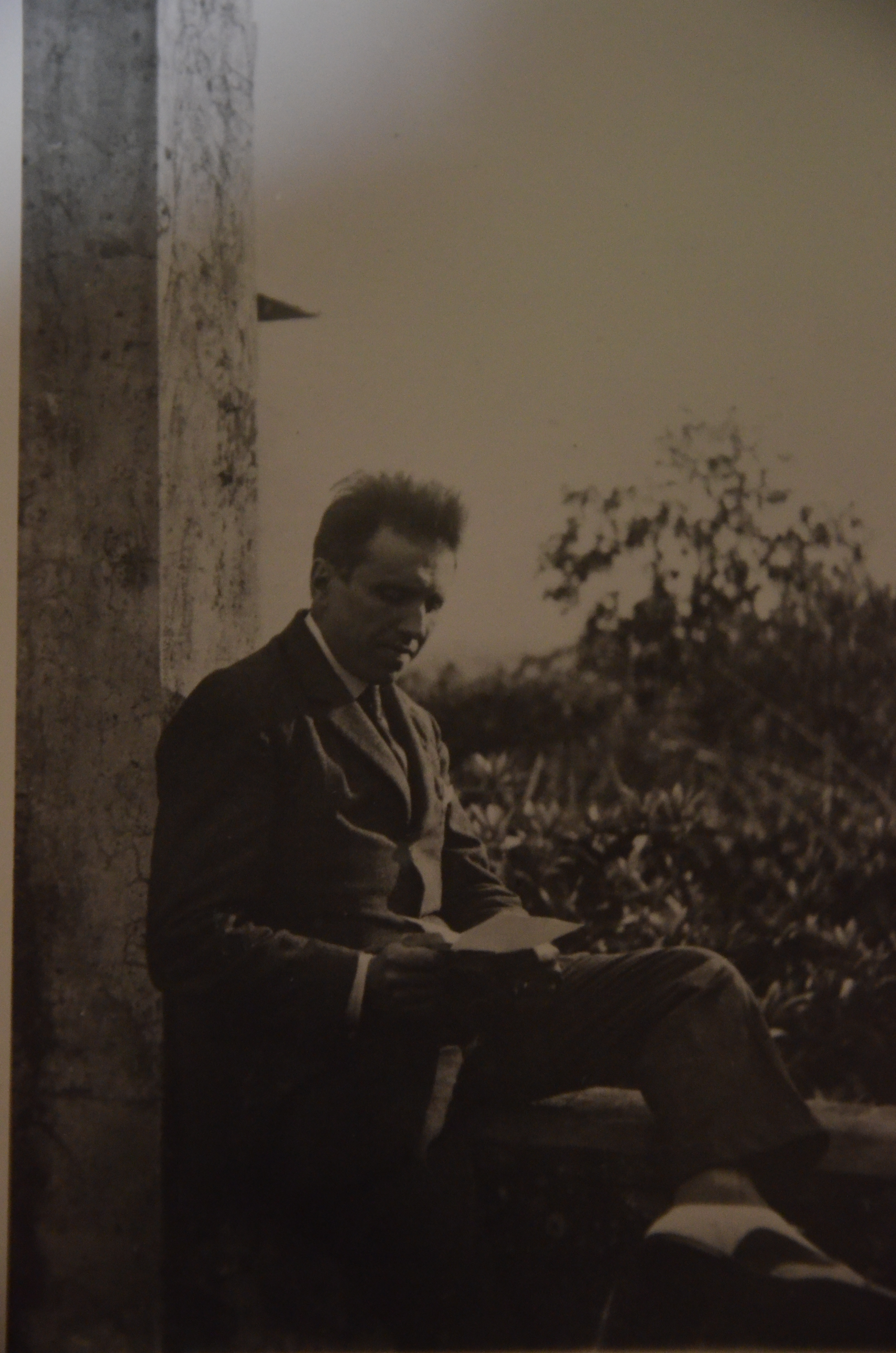

Lamberto Landi (Lucca, September 2, 1882 – Lucca, July 6, 1950) was an Italian composer and conductor.

Born in Lucca, he first studied at that city's Istituto Musicale before traveling to Milan; there he studied with Michele Saladino and Gaetano Coronara at the Conservatory. His opera Il Pergolese, premiered in Milan in 1914, was published by Sonzogno in 1913; Ricordi published it in 1920. Other operas include:

- Bianca (Lucca, 1910)
- Nelly (completed 1916, premiered Lucca, 1947) – after The Old Curiosity Shop by Charles Dickens
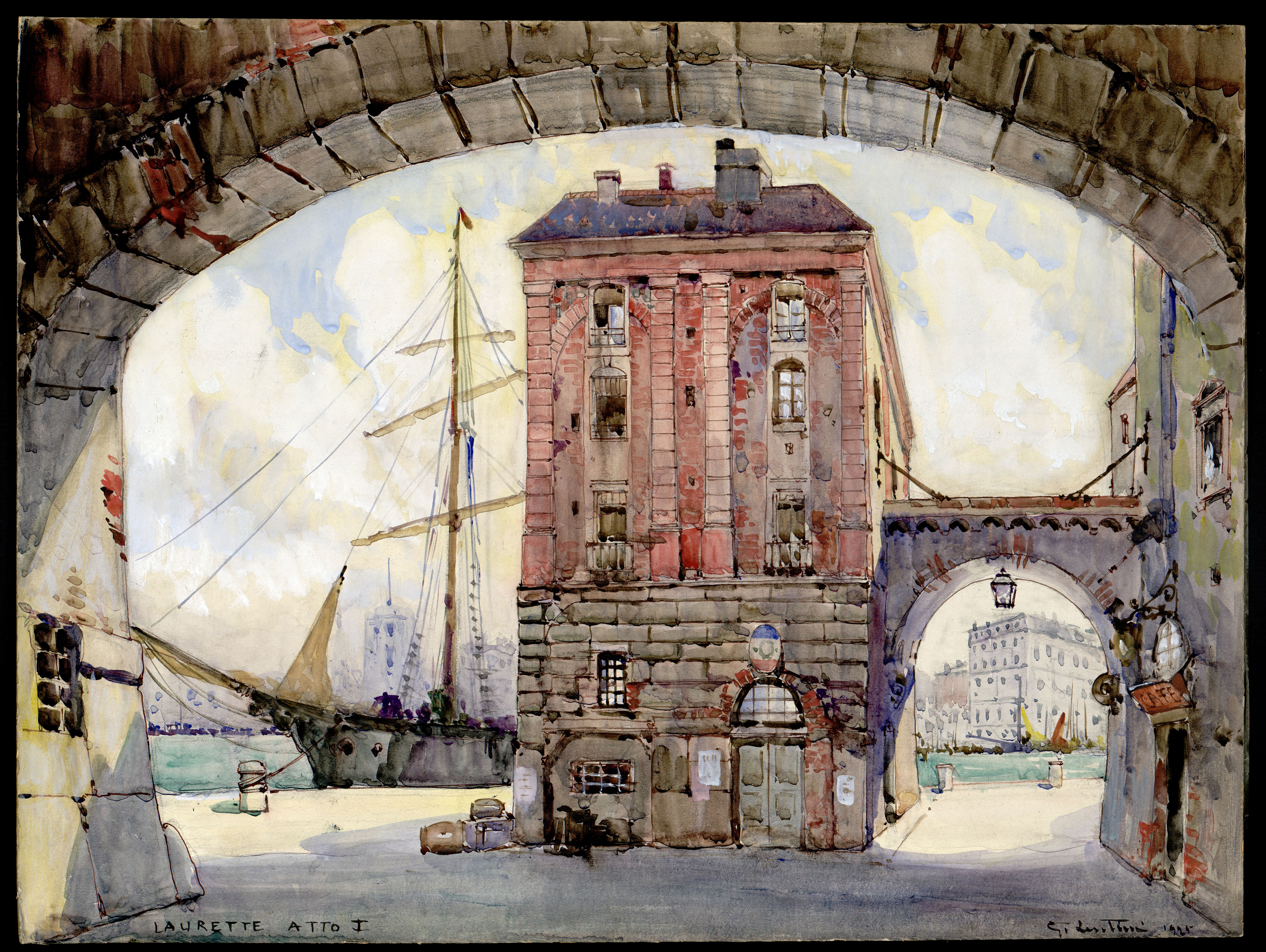
- Bühnenbildentwurf für Laurette (Mailand 1925)
  Laurette (Pisa, 1927)
- Gorgona (after the play by Sem Benelli)
- Nausica

The last two of these were never staged. Other compositions include orchestral works, chamber music, and sacred pieces. Landi taught at the Boccherini Institute in Lucca for some years. He died in Lucca.

A Mass for mixed choir and orchestra has been recorded, along with an Andante for orchestra, and released on the Bongiovanni label. They are paired with a Mass and Andante religioso by Gaetano Luporini.
