= Armanda Degli Abbati =

Italian opera singer

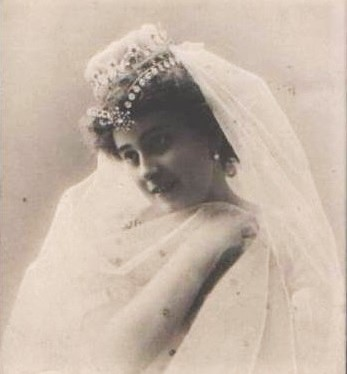
- Born: 10 January 1879; Rome, Italy
- Died: 1946; Karaganda, Kazakhstan
- Other names: Armanda Degli Abbati Campodonico
- Occupations: opera singer (mezzo-soprano); singing teacher

Armanda Degli Abbati, also known as Armanda Degli Abbati Campodonico, (10 January 1879 – 1946) was an Italian opera singer who sang leading mezzo-soprano roles in the opera houses of Italy, South America, and Russia. In 1926 she settled in Estonia where she became a noted vocal pedagogue and trained a generation of Estonian opera singers. She was deported from Estonia during the Soviet occupation in World War II and is presumed to have died in a prison camp in Karaganda. (Note: She is not to be confused with the Argentine mezzo-soprano Amanda Campodónico (1879–1933).)

== Life and career ==
Degli Abbati was born in Rome and studied music there. One of her earliest appearances was as a soloist in a concert of Palestrina's music, at the Accademia Filarmonica Romana in December 1894. In January 1896 she created the role of Madeleine in the premiere of Dario De Rossi's opera Fadette at the Teatro Nazionale in Rome. Later that year, she appeared at the Teatro Mercadante in Naples, reprising the role of Madeleine and creating the role of Mara Nastagia in the premiere of Gaetano Luporini's La Collana di Pasqua. She appeared as Ortrud in Lohengrin at Rome's Teatro Costanzi in 1897 and 1898 and also appeared there in 1898 as Kaled in Massenet's Le roi de Lahore and as Urbain in Meyerbeer's Les Huguenots. She was subsequently engaged by La Scala for its 1898–1899 season where her roles included Meg Page in Verdi's Falstaff as well as reprisals of Kaled and Urbain.

Outside Italy Degli Abbati appeared with touring Italian opera companies in South America where her performances included Amneris in Aida at the Teatro Lyrico in Rio de Janeiro in 1899 and both Brangäne in Tristan und Isolde and Tescheretta in Ettore Panizza's Il Medio Evo Latino at the Teatro de la Opera in Buenos Aires in 1901. She also performed in Imperial Russia at various times between 1900 and 1902 and particularly at the Municipal Theatre in Odessa. Vladimir Jabotinsky wrote about some of her 1901 performances in Odessa for the Odesskie Novosti and had met her through his friend, the young revolutionary Vsevolod Lebedintsev. Jabotinsky later wrote in his memoirs that Lebedintsev "divided his time and his enthusiasm among his three ideals: the study of astronomy at the university, evenings at the Italian opera, and also love-making with the young singer Armanda degli Abbati."

The years between 1902 and 1904 saw the assumption of several major roles for Degli Abbati. She sang Cristina in Il voto and the title roles in Fedora and Carmen at the Teatro Bellini in Naples in 1902, Gertrude in Hamlet at the Teatro Adriano in Rome in 1903, and Princess de Bouillon in Adriana Lecouvreur at the Teatro Massimo in Palermo in 1904. Her marriage in Rome to Attilio Campodonico and her intention to retire from the operatic stage were announced in Musica e musicisti in 1904. After her marriage she appeared in the occasional concert and gave voice lessons in Genoa from her studio in Piazza Giustiniani. In the 1920s, she taught singing in Rome and was a member of the Circulo russo (Russian Circle) there. She briefly came out of retirement in July 1921 to sing the title role in the premiere of Francesco Marcacci's opera Nadeida at the Teatro Adriano.

In 1926 the Estonian tenor Karl Ots, who had been one of her students in Rome, persuaded the Estonian Ministry of Education to invite Degli Abbati to Tallinn to teach singing. She decided to settle there permanently and opened her own studio where she trained a whole generation of Estonian opera singers. She organized concert performances featuring her students and also composed several art songs for them to sing at the concerts. With the Soviet occupation of Estonia, she was arrested as an enemy alien in 1941 and deported to a prison camp in Karaganda in what is now Kazakhstan. She is presumed to have died there in 1946. Her last communication was a letter she sent to one of her students in Estonia dated 27 August 1946.
