= Giosuè Carducci Secondary School (Lucca) =

Coordinates: 43.8436°N 10.5129°E

- Scuola Secondaria di I Grado "Giosuè Carducci"

Location
- Piazza San Ponziano, 6 Lucca, LU, 55100; Italy

Information
- Type: Public Middle School
- Established: 1 October 1942
- Website: icluccacentrostorico.edu.it

The Giosuè Carducci Secondary School (Italian: Scuola Secondaria di I Grado "Giosuè Carducci") is a public middle school located in the historic center of Lucca, Tuscany, Italy. It is part of the Istituto Comprensivo Lucca Centro Storico, which also includes primary and preschool facilities within the city walls.

== History ==
The school was founded on 1 October 1942 as the Regia Scuola Media di Piazza San Ponziano, in accordance with the educational reform led by Minister Giuseppe Bottai. Its first principal was Professor Emilio Pasquini, who held the position until 1959. On 22 November 1949, the school was renamed in honor of the poet and Nobel laureate Giosuè Carducci, following a unanimous proposal by the teaching staff. An annual scholarship still bears Pasquini's name.

In 2012, the school merged with the First Didactic Circle of Lucca, forming the current comprehensive institution.

== Historical campus: The San Ponziano Monastery ==
The school is housed in the former Monastery of San Ponziano, a historically significant complex near Porta Elisa. The monastery was originally founded in 790 during the episcopacy of Bishop Giovanni I and his brother, the deacon Jacopo—sons of Teutpert de Placule, one of Lucca's most prominent Lombard landowners in the Carolingian era.

Initially dedicated to Saints James and Philip, the monastery came under papal patronage and accumulated extensive land holdings through faithful donations. In the early 9th century, it was also dedicated to Saint Pontian when his relics were transferred there, along with a relic of the holy blood, formerly kept in San Frediano.

The Benedictine community initially occupied the building, and by the end of the 10th century, it was entrusted to the Black Benedictines. Their prestige is evidenced by a privilege granted to the monastery by Emperor Otto III. In 1099, Countess Matilda of Tuscany donated land for a hospice for the poor and pilgrims traveling the Via Francigena, solidifying the site's importance in medieval Lucca's religious and charitable life.

The 2023 publication Ponziano Matilde outlines the monastery's architectural evolution, including:

- vaulted ceilings and cloister layouts,
- preserved frescoes,
- 17th-century façades,
- a still-functioning historic auditorium.

== Connection to the Boccherini Music Institute ==
From 1926 until 1994, the monastery housed the historic Istituto Musicale Luigi Boccherini under the direction of composer Gaetano Luporini. Its successor and grandson, Gaetano Giani Luporini, also a well-known composer, later directed the school. The acoustics and thick walls of the former monastery made it ideal for musical training. The still-present auditorium was used for student recitals and concerts. Renowned Lucchese composers such as Michele Puccini, Giacomo Puccini, Alfredo Catalani, and the Luporini family all studied at the institute during its time in the San Ponziano complex.

== Educational program ==
The school offers lower secondary education (ages 11–14) and focuses on:

- autonomous learning and social interaction,
- digital and interdisciplinary skills,
- orientation toward further education or training,
- bilingualism and European cultural awareness.

== Music curriculum ==
Since 2006, the school offers a specialized musical programme including:

- Clarinet
- Piano
- Violin
- Cello

Students receive weekly lessons in music theory, instrumental technique, and ensemble playing. The school's orchestra performs regularly at institutional events.

== Languages ==
The school offers:

- English (compulsory)
- Second languages: French, Spanish, or German

Language teaching is enriched by:

- Erasmus+ projects
- European language certifications (Trinity, DELF, DELE, KET)
- Theatre and immersion experiences

== Timetable ==
- Monday to Friday, 08:00–14:00
- Two breaks: 09:50–10:05 and 11:50–12:00
- Optional afternoon labs and instrumental courses

== Scholarships ==
Each year, the San Ponziano Foundation awards merit-based scholarships to students with top marks in Italian, mathematics, and English.

== Notable alumni ==
- Mirko Tognetti, founder of Cremeria Opera, a globally recognized artisanal gelato brand
