= Pietro Cimara =

Italian composer, conductor and pianist

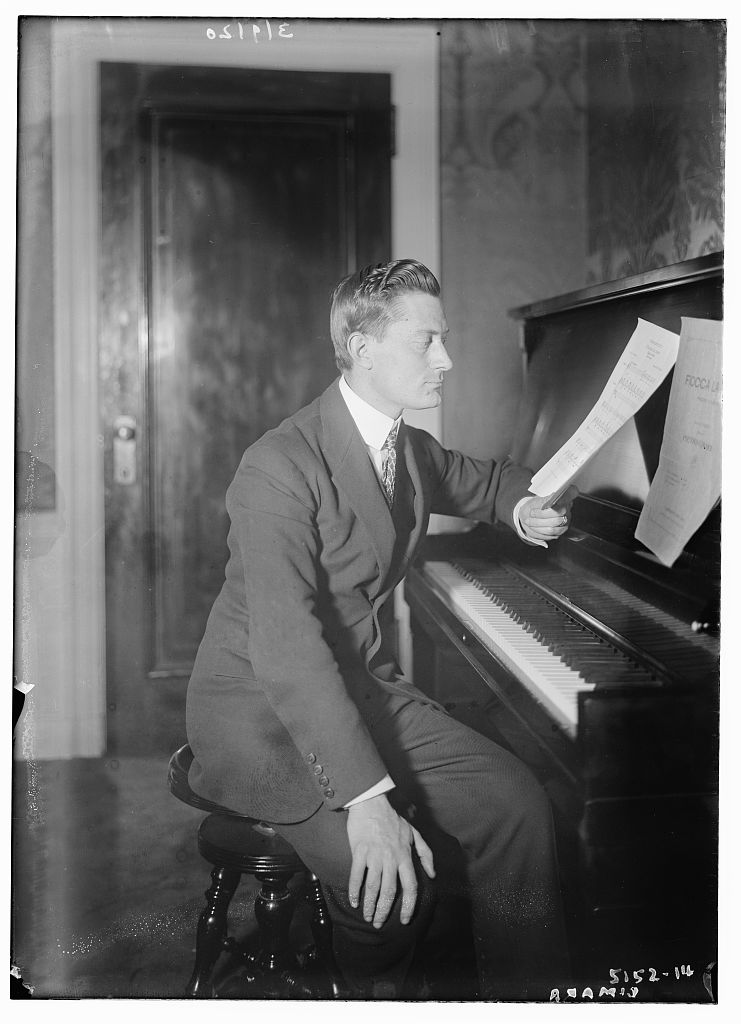
Pietro Cimara on March 9, 1920

Pietro Cimara (10 November 1887 – 1 October 1967) was an Italian composer, conductor and pianist.

== Biography ==
He was born on 10 November 1887 in Rome.

He was a student of Respighi at the Accademia di Santa Cecilia in Rome. His output included many songs. He was published by Francesco Bongiovanni of Bologna.

He became a United States citizen on January 22, 1946.

From 1950 to 1957 he was conductor at the Metropolitan Opera, where he had a stroke on January 13, 1958, while conducting La Forza del Destino, after which he retired to Italy.

He died on 1 October 1967 in Milan.
