= Sant'Elia Fiumerapido =

- Comune
- Comune di Sant'Elia Fiumerapido
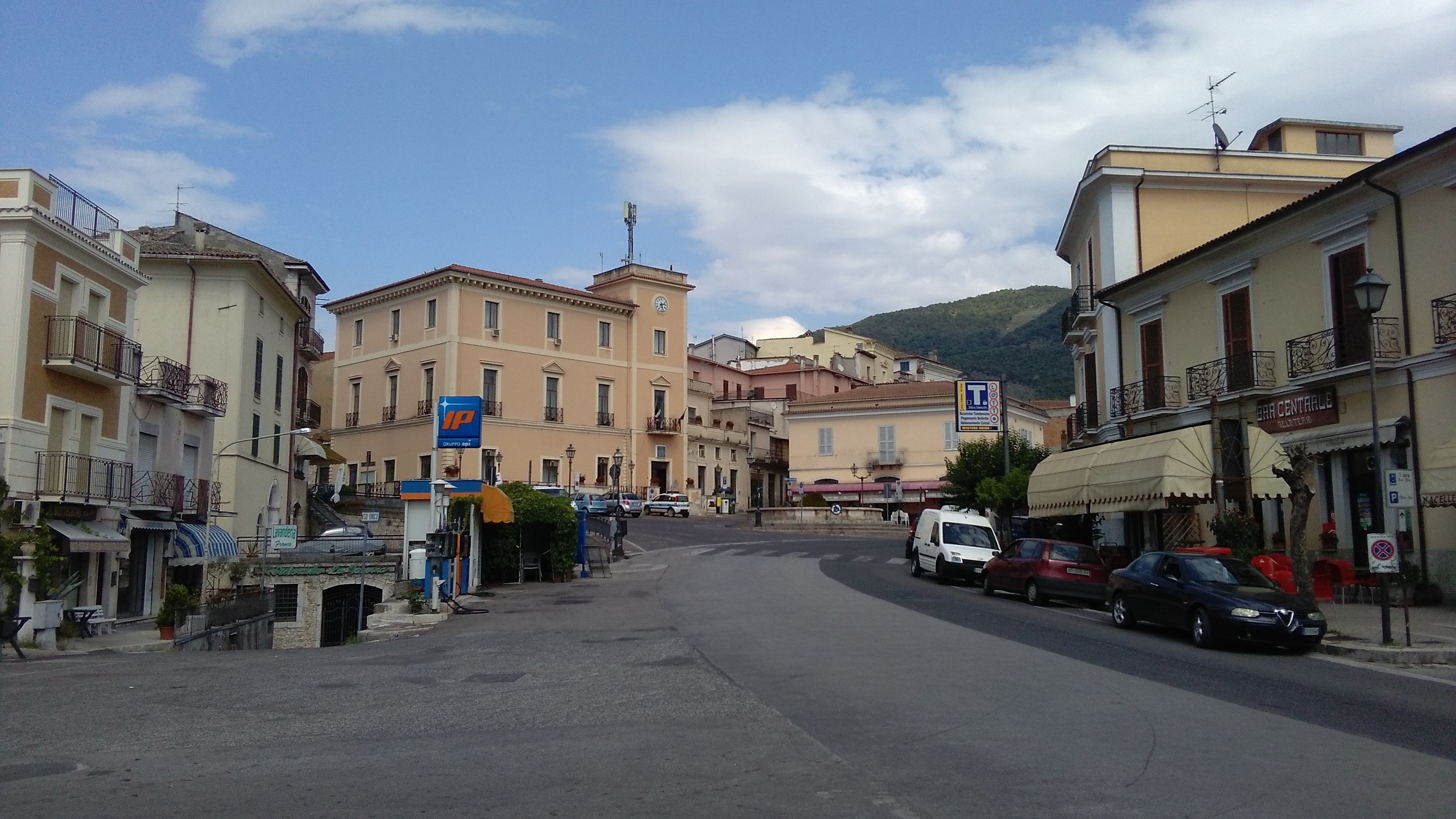
- View of Sant'Elia Fiumerapido

- Coat of arms

- Location within Italy Location within Lazio
- Coordinates: 41°33′N 13°52′E
- Country: Italy
- Region: Lazio
- Province: Frosinone (FR)

Government
  - Mayor: Roberto Angelosanto

Area
  - Total: 41 km^{2} (16 sq mi)
- Elevation: 120 m (390 ft)

Population (28 February 2017)
  - Total: 6,116
  - Density: 150/km^{2} (390/sq mi)
- Demonym: Santeliani
- Time zone: UTC+1 (CET)
  - Summer (DST): UTC+2 (CEST)
- Postal code: 03049
- Dialing code: 0776
- Website: Official website

Sant'Elia Fiumerapido is a town and comune in the province of Frosinone, in the Latin Valley, in the Lazio region of central Italy.

The composer Giuseppe Bozzelli was born in Sant'Elia Fiumerapido in 1841. Part of the motion picture The Devil's Brigade was filmed there in 1967.
