= Matteo Sansone (musicologist) =

Italian musicologist

Matteo Sansone is an Italian musicologist who specializes in the study of 19th-century Italian opera. He received his PhD in Italian Literature from the University of Edinburgh and teaches the subject of Italian Opera at New York University in Florence and at the British Institute of Florence. He is the author of several publications on the topic of opera and has written several entries in the Grove Dictionary of Music and Musicians.
