= Gaetano Giani Luporini =

Italian composer and academic (1936–2022)

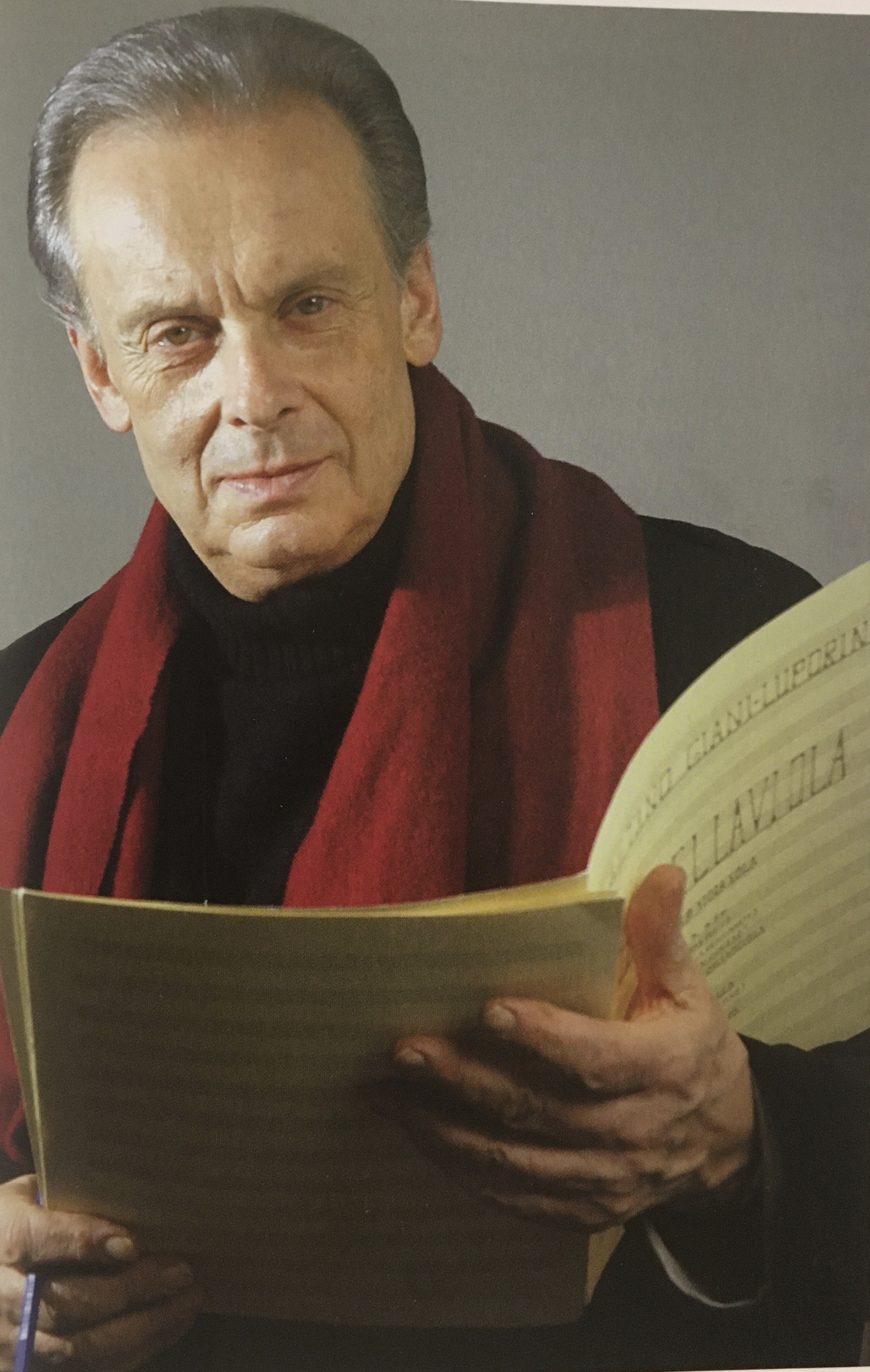
- Born: 28 May 1936; Lucca, Italy
- Died: 27 February 2022 (aged 85); Barga, Province of Lucca, Italy
- Occupation: Composer

Gaetano Giani Luporini (28 May 1936 – 27 February 2022) was an Italian composer and academic.

== Life and career ==
Born in Lucca, the grandson of the composer Gaetano Luporini, after studying violin he enrolled at the Conservatorio Luigi Cherubini in Florence, graduating in composition under Roberto Lupi. Between 1968 and 1986 he was professor of Harmony and Counterpoint at his alma mater, and between 1986 and 2003 he directed the Luigi Boccherini Conservatory in his hometown.

Luporini composed chamber, opera, symphonic and choral music. He was also active as a composer of incidental music, and was well known as a faithful collaborator of Carmelo Bene for about twenty years.

Luporini died from complications of COVID-19 in Barga, Province of Lucca, on 27 February 2022, at the age of 85.
