= Giuseppe Bozzelli =

Italian composer and conductor

Giuseppe Bozzelli (6 October 1841 – c.1892) was an Italian composer and conductor, primarily known for his art songs. Born in Sant'Elia Fiumerapido, a small town in the Lazio region south of Rome, he spent most of his career in the north of Italy, primarily Turin and Bergamo.

After initial musical studies in his native town, Bozzelli won a scholarship to the San Pietro a Maiella Conservatory in Naples where he specialised in composition. One of his earliest published works was an Ave Maria for orchestra, tenor soloist, and choir. His 1868 composition set to the poetry of Giovanni Prati was performed at the wedding of Umberto I of Italy and Margherita of Savoy in Turin on 22 April of that year. He later became deputy director of the Institute of Musical Studies in Bergamo and in 1871 moved to the Teatro Scribe in Turin as its resident conductor and composer. In 1873 he was commissioned by the Ministry of the Interior for the music for a funeral mass in memory of Charles Albert of Sardinia. Bozelli's three-act opera Caterina di Belp to a libretto by Orlando Ciani was performed at the Teatro Balbo in Turin in 1876. Bozzelli died in Turin and was buried in Naples.
