= L'amico Fritz =

1891 opera by Pietro Mascagni

- Opera by Pietro Mascagni
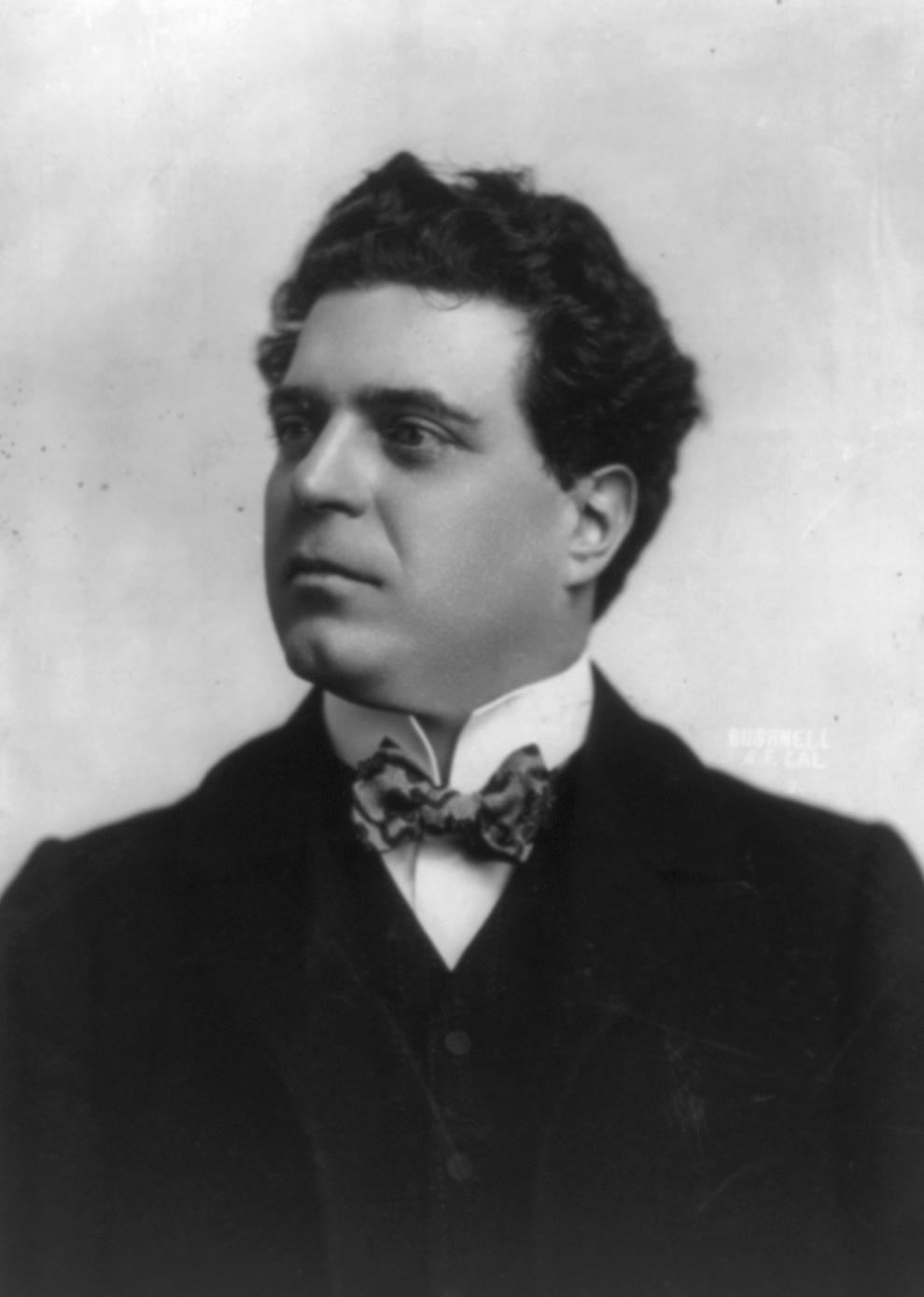
- The composer in 1903
- Librettist: P. Suardon
- Language: Italian
- Based on: L'Ami Fritz by Émile Erckmann and Alexandre Chatrian
- Premiere: 31 October 1891; Teatro Costanzi, Rome

L'amico Fritz (Italian: [laˈmiːko ˈfrits]) is an opera in three acts by Pietro Mascagni, premiered in 1891 to a libretto by P. Suardon (Nicola Daspuro) (with additions by Giovanni Targioni-Tozzetti), based on the 1864 French novel L'Ami Fritz by Émile Erckmann and Alexandre Chatrian.

While the opera enjoyed some success in its day and is probably Mascagni's most famous work after Cavalleria rusticana, today it is performed far more rarely than Cavalleria, which remains Mascagni's only enduringly popular work outside Italy, where L'amico Fritz and Iris are still in the active repertoire. The "Cherry Duet" ("Suzel, buon dì") between Fritz and Suzel in act 2 is the best known piece in the opera and is often performed separately in concert.

== Performance history ==
The opera was first performed in Rome at the Teatro Costanzi, on 31 October 1891. Other first performances include those in Hamburg on 16 January 1892 with Gustav Mahler conducting; in London on 23 May 1892 at the Royal Opera House, Covent Garden; and in Australia on 19 October 1893 at the Princess's Theatre in Melbourne. It was first staged in the United States at the Grand Opera House in Philadelphia on June 8, 1892.

== Roles ==
Roles, voice types, premiere cast
Role	Voice type	Premiere cast, 31 October 1891 Conductor: Rodolfo Ferrari
Fritz Kobus, a wealthy landowner	tenor	Fernando De Lucia
Suzel, daughter of a tenant of Fritz	soprano	Emma Calvé
Beppe, Fritz's friend, a gypsy	mezzo-soprano (en travesti)	Ortensia Synnemberg
Federico, a friend to Fritz	tenor	Guglielmo Bessi
Hanezò, a friend to Fritz	bass	Giuseppe Cremona
David, a rabbi	baritone	Paul Lhérie
Caterina, a servant	soprano	Lina Parpagnoli

Soprano Carla Gavazzi as Suzel

== Synopsis ==
Time: indefinite; sometime in the 19th century
Place: Alsace

=== Act 1 ===
The dining room of Fritz Kobus' house

Fritz Kobus, a wealthy landowner is in discussion with his friend David, the local rabbi. Despite his disdain for marriage Fritz agrees to provide the dowry for a young couple. Fritz's friends join him to celebrate his birthday. He is presented with a bouquet by Suzel, the daughter of one of his tenants. She joins the birthday celebration and is moved when the gypsy Beppe enters playing his violin. When Suzel leaves David comments that she will make a good bride and that he will find her a husband. Fritz protests that she is too young. They argue about marriage and Fritz bets David one of his vineyards that he will never marry.

=== Act 2 ===
The courtyard of a farm

Suzel is preparing to pick cherries as the farmers go out to the fields. Fritz approaches and helps her. They sing of the enchantment of the spring and the flowers ("Cherry Duet"). Fritz's friends arrive and Fritz leaves to look over the farms. David stays behind to talk to Suzel. When he suggests that she might be a bride, she becomes embarrassed and leaves. Fritz returns and David mentions that he thinks he has found the right man for Suzel to marry. Fritz becomes visibly upset and, left alone, realizes that he is in love with the girl.

=== Act 3 ===
The dining room of Fritz Kobus' house

Fritz cannot banish thoughts of Suzel. Beppe enters and attempts to cheer him up with a song, but Fritz becomes even more depressed. David arrives and tells Fritz that Suzel is engaged to a fine young man and her father will soon ask for Fritz's blessing. Enraged, Fritz says that he will refuse and leaves. Suzel enters sadly but David insists that everything will be all right. He leaves her alone and she voices her despair and love for Fritz. Fritz enters and asks about her engagement. He quickly senses that she does not love her intended. Fritz reveals his feelings for her and the two admit their love. David enters and declares that he has won his wager with Fritz, telling him that he is going to give his winnings, Fritz's vineyard, to Suzel as a wedding present.

== Recordings ==
Year	Cast: Fritz, Suzel, Beppe, David	Conductor, opera house and orchestra	Label
1942	Ferruccio Tagliavini, Pia Tassinari, Amalia Pini, Saturno Meletti	Pietro Mascagni; RAI National Symphony Orchestra and Chorus	LP: Cetra
1951	Beniamino Gigli; Rina Gigli; Afro Poli; Miriam Pirazzini	Gianandrea Gavazzeni; Chorus and Orchestra of the Teatro San Carlo, Naples	CD: Eklipse Records
1968	Luciano Pavarotti, Mirella Freni, Laura Didier Gambardella, Vicente Sardinero	Gianandrea Gavazzeni; Chorus and Orchestra of The Royal Opera, Covent Garden	CD: EMI
2009	Roberto Alagna, Angela Gheorghiu, Laura Polverelli, George Petean	Alberto Veronesi; Chorus and Orchestra of the Deutsche Oper Berlin	CD: Deutsche Grammophon
