= Goffredo Cognetti =

Italian dramatist (1855–1943)

Goffredo Cognetti (Naples 1855 – Castiglioncello, Livorno 1943) was an Italian writer.

== Works ==
- Mala vita, verismo play with Salvatore Di Giacomo, on which the opera Mala vita was based.
- Scene popolari napoletane (1889), on which the opera A Santa Lucia was based
- O voto, 1889 play on which the opera A basso porto was based
