= Gemma Bellincioni =

Italian opera singer

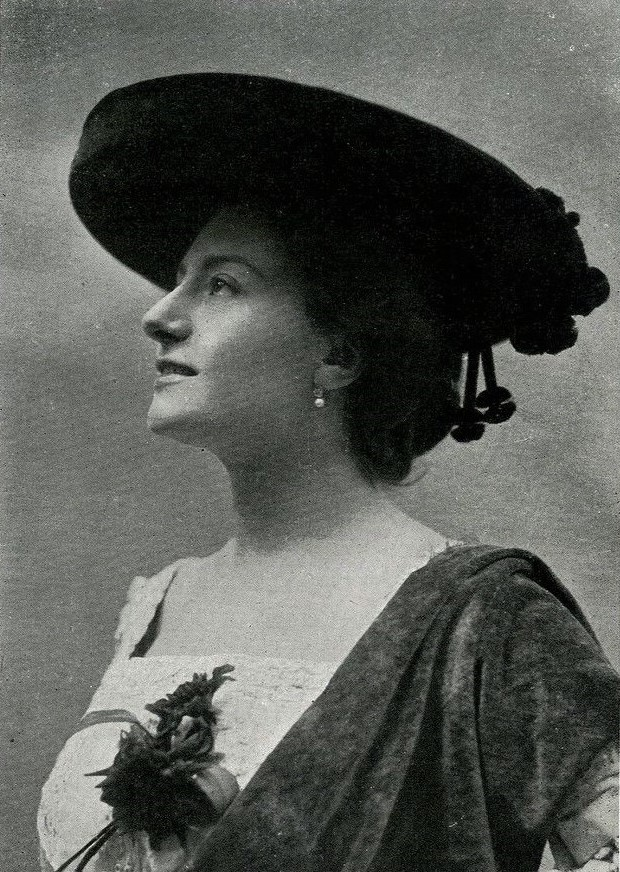
- Bellincioni, c. 1906
- Born: Matilda Cesira Bellincioni; 18 August 1864; Monza, province of Milan, Italy (now Monza, province of Monza and Brianza, Lombardy, Italy)
- Died: 23 April 1950 (aged 85); Naples, Italy
- Burial place: Cimitero di Santa Maria delle Grazie, Livorno, province of Livorno, Tuscany, Italy
- Occupation: Operatic soprano
- Years active: 1880–1911, 1916–1923
- Partner: Roberto Stagno (1886–d. 1897)
- Children: 1

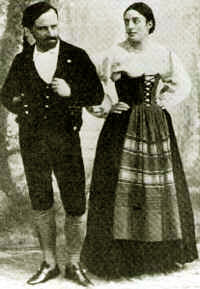
Gemma Bellincioni as Santuzza, and her partner on stage and in private life, Roberto Stagno, as Turiddu, costumed for the 1890 Rome premiere of Cavalleria rusticana.

Gemma Bellincioni (born Matilda Cesira Bellincioni) (Italian pronunciation: [ˈdʒɛmma bellinˈtʃoːni]; 18 August 1864 – 23 April 1950) was an Italian dramatic soprano and one of the best-known opera singers of the late 19th century. She had a particular affinity with the verismo repertoire and was renowned for both, her charismatic acting and the quality of her voice.

== Career ==
Matilda Cesira Bellincioni was Bellincioni's real name. She was born in Monza, Italy, in August 1864. Both her parents were singers, and after receiving training from them, she made her operatic debut in Naples in 1880. She went on to sing extensively in Europe and South America during the next two decades, although she would appear only once in London—at the Royal Opera House, Covent Garden—in 1895. Despite her fame, she never performed at America's foremost operatic venue, the New York Metropolitan Opera.

Italy's leading composer, Giuseppe Verdi, admired Bellincioni's acting ability. Verdi had encountered her in 1886 when she performed Violetta in his opera La traviata at La Scala, Milan. Evidently, however, he was not so impressed by her vocal technique because he did not elect to cast her to sing the part of Desdemona at the premiere of Otello the following year. On the other hand, Bellincioni's histrionic manner, accentuated diction and arresting stage presence were to prove ideally suited to a melodramatic new style of Italian opera known as verismo, which became popular during the 1890s. She sang this type of music with great passion, although her actual voice was not particularly large in size or ripe in tone, and marred by a distinct flutter. (See Scott, cited below.)

On 17 May 1890, she created the role of Santuzza in Pietro Mascagni's landmark verismo work Cavalleria Rusticana when it premiered in Rome. Her common-law spouse Roberto Stagno, a prominent tenor from Sicily, sang opposite her in the role of Turiddu at that same premiere performance: they had met on a tour of Argentina in 1886.

Bellincioni was also the first soprano to perform the title role in another key verismo opera, Umberto Giordano's Fedora, on 17 November 1898. (Her tenor partner on this occasion was a promising young singer named Enrico Caruso.) Eight years later, she starred in the Italian premiere of Richard Strauss' Salome. She announced her retirement from the stage in 1911 to teach singing, but re-emerged in 1916 to play the lead female part in a silent-film version of Cavalleria Rusticana that was directed by Ugo Falena.

As late as the early 1920s, she gave a few performances in The Netherlands, but her voice was said to be in a threadbare condition by this date.

Bellincioni had written an instructional manual for singers which was published in Berlin in 1912 and an autobiography, Io e il palcoscenico, which was published in Milan in 1920. She spent her final years living in Naples, where she died at the age of 85, survived by a daughter. (Stagno, her de facto husband, had died 53 years earlier.)

Bellincioni's voice can still be heard on CD reissues (most notably on the Marston label) of a few recordings which she made for the Gramophone & Typewriter Company and the Pathé firm in the early 1900s (decade). She was past her best when she made them and they disappoint artistically and musically; but they are considered to be of major historical interest because her career was so significant (see Scott cited below).

Bellincioni also taught singing. One of her students was contralto Amy Ellerman.
