= Bongiovanni (record label) =

F. Bongiovanni (1905) of Bologna is an Italian classical music publisher and, since 1975, classical record label. The company was founded by Francesco Bongiovanni to publish the works of then modern composers such as Respighi, Zandonai, Alfano, Pietro Cimara, and Francesco Balilla Pratella. Among the most famous pieces published by Bongiovanni are Respighi's Nebbie and Balilla Pratella's futurist manifesto in music, Musica Futurista. Bongiovanni played a central role in promoting music written by the composers of the Generazione dell'80, and in 1938 Alfredo Casella wrote: "The history of music in Bologna can't be written without the name Bongiovanni".

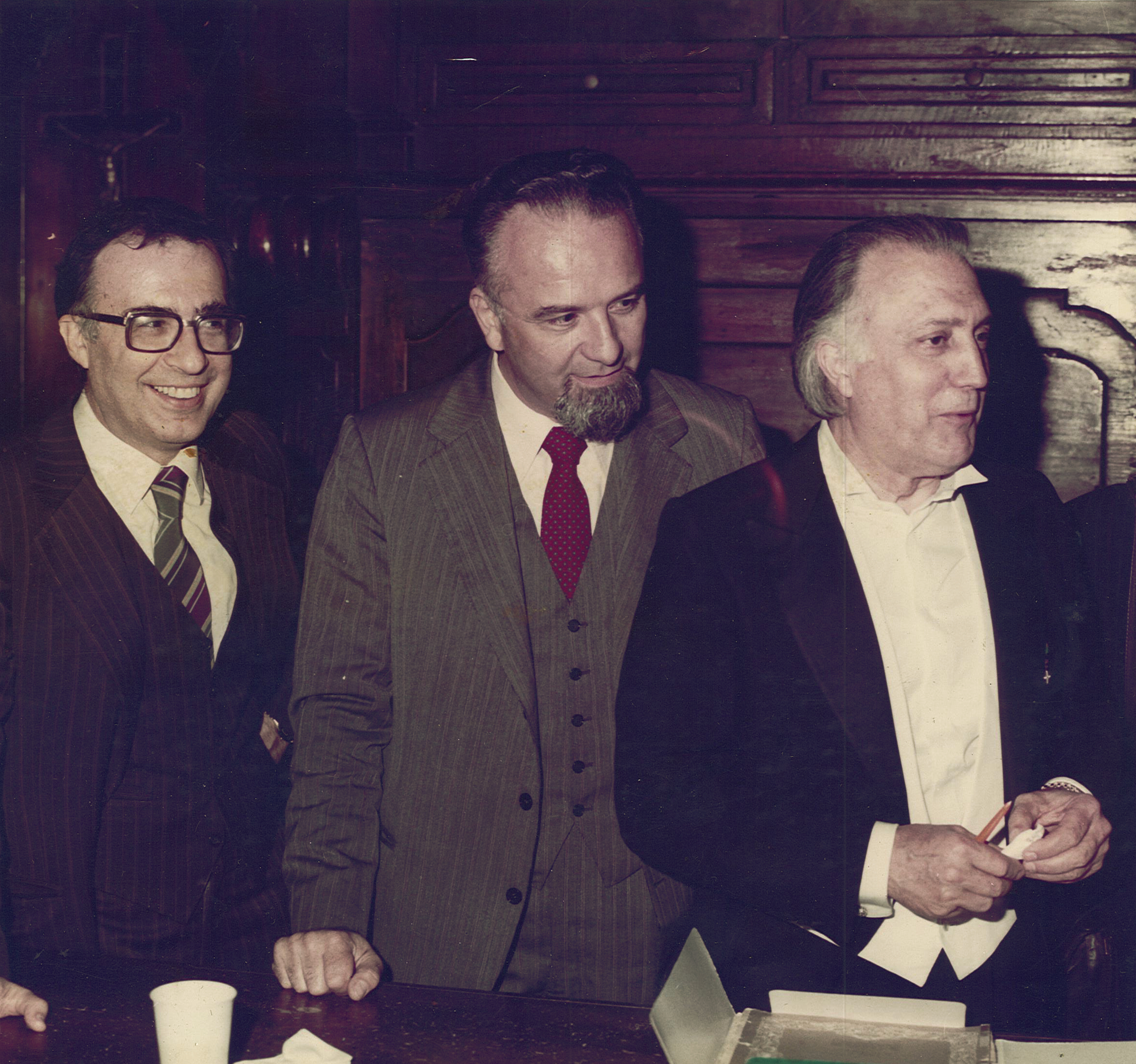
Giancarlo Bongiovanni with Piero Cappuccilli and Leone Magiera

In 1975, Bongiovanni produced its first record, a live recital of Mirella Freni, for which the company received the 1976 Award of the Italian Record Critics. At that time, professional produced live recordings of classical music were still a rarity, and the then owner Giancarlo Bongiovanni can be seen as a pioneer in this regard. Soon, the company expanded its catalogue of live recordings, knitting close ties to the most prolific opera singers of the 1970s and 1980s: from Luciano Pavarotti to Piero Cappuccilli, from Mariella Devia to Giuseppe Giacomini. Today, their label is not only known for live recordings and historical opera recordings, but also for unusual recordings of rare Italian repertoire and particularly lesser known bel canto Italian operas. Bongiovanni also has a long history as a publisher of books of musical interest. Among the most famous books published by Bongiovanni is Giacomo Lauri-Volpi's Voci Parallele. The company runs a small shop in Bologna where they sell records, books and sheet music.
