= Roberto Stagno =

Italian opera singer

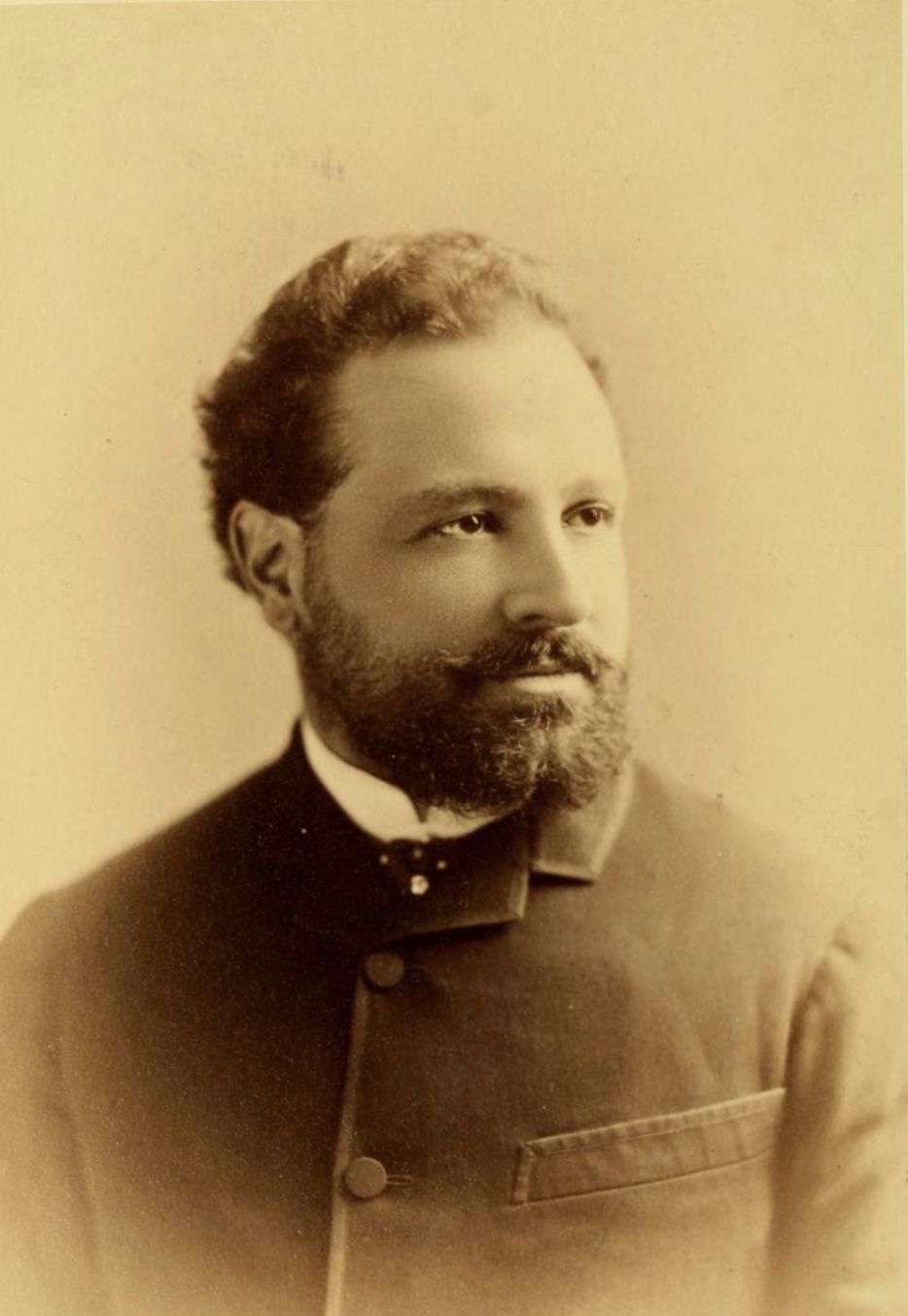
Roberto Stagno

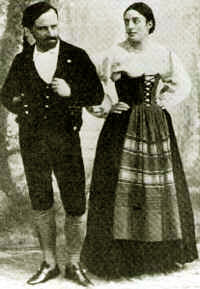
Roberto Stagno as Turiddu and his de facto wife Gemma Bellincioni as Santuzza, costumed for the 1890 Rome premiere of Cavalleria rusticana.

Roberto Stagno (Italian pronunciation: [roˈbɛrto ˈstaɲɲo]; 18 October 1840 [some sources give 1836 as his birth year] – 26 April 1897) was a prominent Italian opera tenor. He became an important interpreter of verismo music when it burst on to the operatic scene during the 1890s; but he also possessed an agile bel canto technique which he employed in operas dating from earlier periods. In 1890, he created the pivotal verismo role of Turiddu.

== Career ==
Stagno (real name Vincenzo Andrioli) was born in Palermo, Sicily, into a family with connections to the minor nobility.

He studied in Milan in Northern Italy and made his operatic debut in Lisbon, Portugal, in 1862. His career breakthrough came three years later, however, when he substituted successfully for Italy's most celebrated dramatic tenor, Enrico Tamberlik, in a Madrid performance of Robert le diable.

During the next three decades, Stagno performed in a variety of operas at major opera houses in Spain, Italy, France and Russia, building and then consolidating his reputation as one of Europe's leading tenors.

Stagno was popular, too, in Argentina, where he appeared initially in 1879, and he also performed for one entire season (1883–84) in the United States, at the New York Metropolitan Opera where he sang leading roles in the company premieres of several core works of the Italian repertory including Il trovatore, I puritani, Rigoletto, and La Gioconda. Unfortunately for Stagno, his time in New York was to prove shorter than he would have liked: American audiences expressed reservations about his singing because of its pronounced and persistent vibrato.

He resumed his career in Italy and South America where his vocal method was more appreciated. Then, in Rome, on 17 May 1890, he made operatic history when he created the role of Turiddu at the first performance of Mascagni's enduringly popular and highly influential one-act verismo work, Cavalleria rusticana. His common-law wife, the soprano Gemma Bellincioni, sang opposite him in the role of Santuzza. (They had met at sea while travelling to Buenos Aires in 1886 with a troupe of singers.) Their daughter, Bianca Stagno-Bellincioni (1888–1980), was a singer and actress. In 1945, she published a book about her parents.

Stagno was only 57 when he died in Genoa of combined renal and cardiac ailments. No recordings survive of his voice, which was lyric-dramatic in size and said to have had a warm, vibrant if tremulous timbre. Of those early tenors who did record, Fernando De Lucia (1860–1925) was perhaps the most similar to Stagno in sound and style. De Lucia, although trained in the "old school", as was Stagno, likewise became renowned in the 1890s as an interpreter of verismo roles. (See Michael Scott, The Record of Singing, Volume 1, Duckworth, London, 1977.)

== Sources ==
- Warrack, John and West, Ewan (1992), The Oxford Dictionary of Opera, 782 pages, ISBN 0-19-869164-5
