= Gaetano Luporini =

Italian classical composer

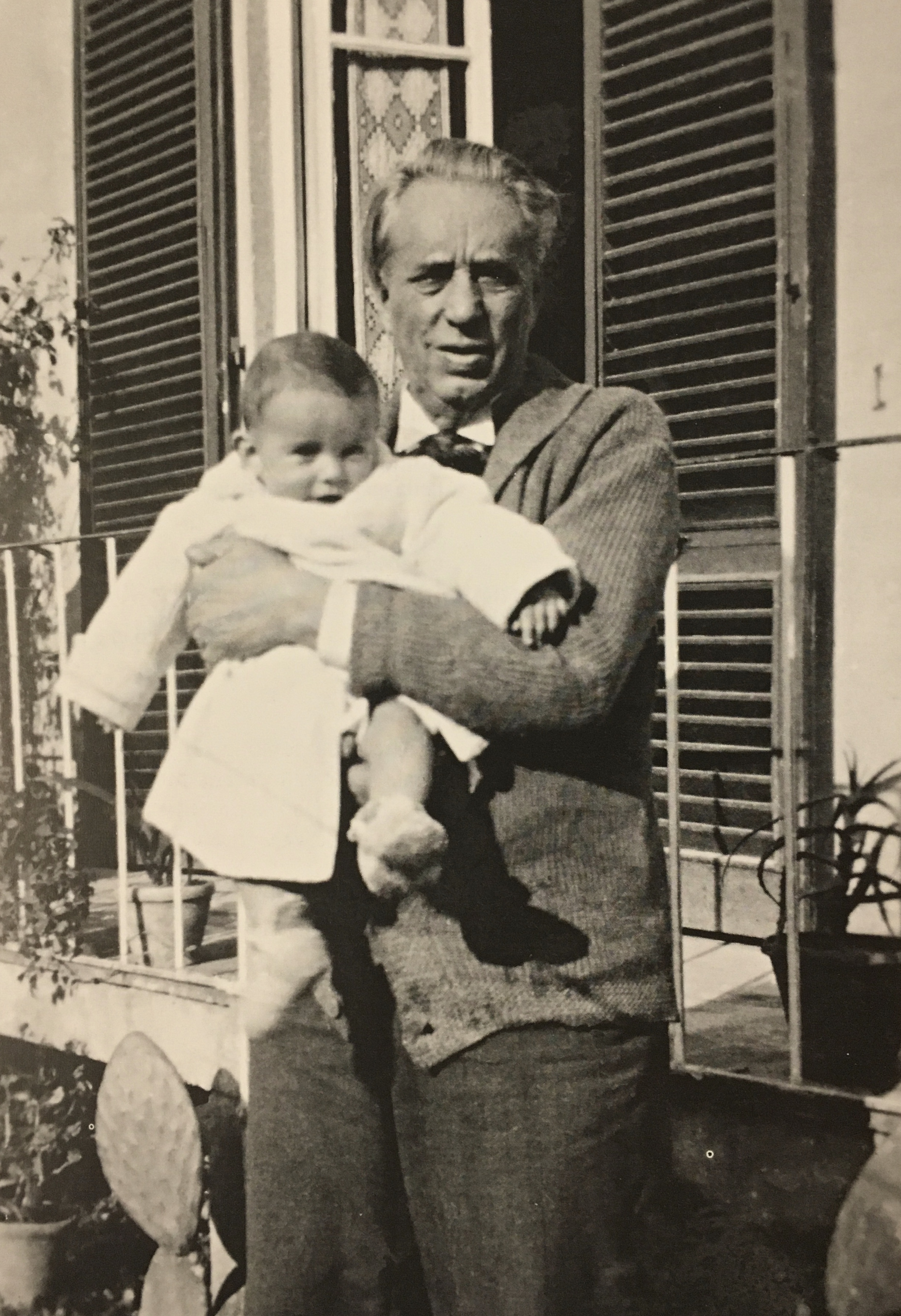
Gaetano Luporini holding his grandson, Gaetano Giani Luporini (1936)

Giovanni Gaetano Luporini (1865–1948) was an Italian composer. A native of Lucca, he studied there with Carlo Angeloni before transferring to the Milan Conservatory, where he studied with Anselmi and Alfredo Catalani. He served as director of Lucca's Pacini Institute between 1902 and 1937. As a composer, he was active in the field of sacred music, and served as maestro di cappella of the Lucca Cathedral.

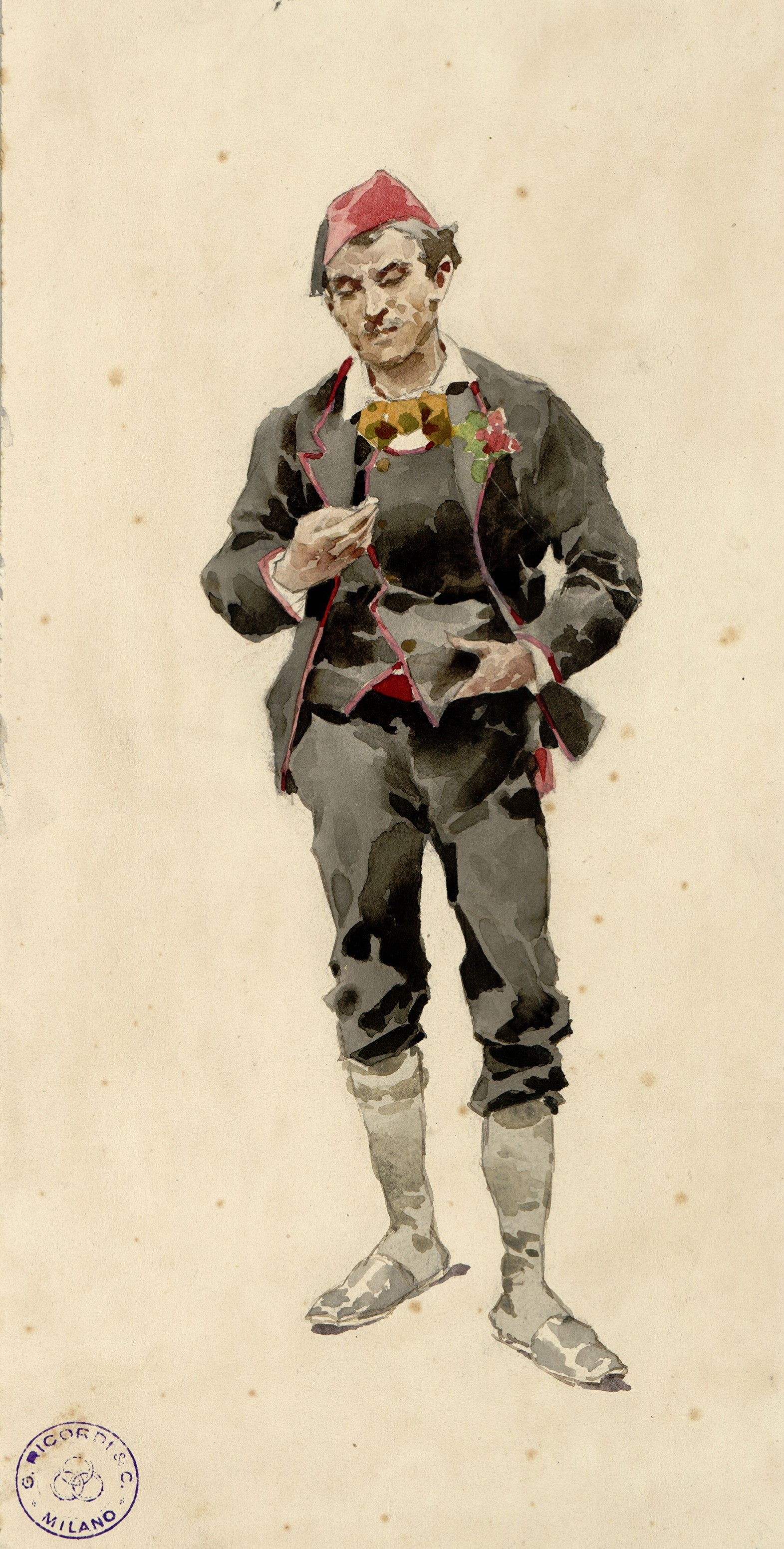
Tita, costume design by Adolfo Hohenstein for I dispetti amorosi, act 3 (1894)

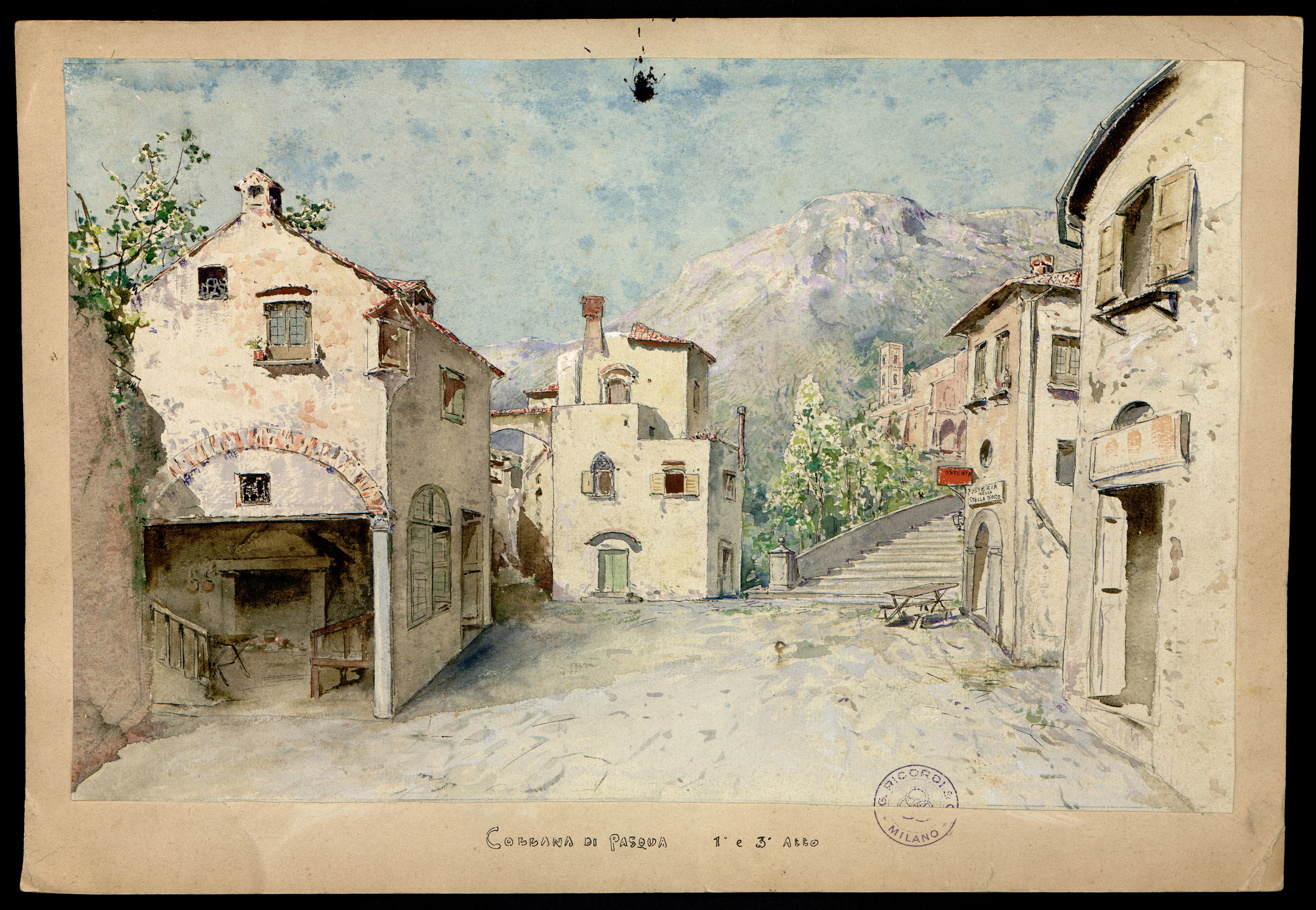
Set design for La collana di Pasqua, act 1, 3 (1896)

Luporini also composed orchestral and vocal music. He wrote a number of operas, including:

- Marcella (Milan, 1891)
- I dispetti amorosi (Turin, 1894) – libretto by Luigi Illica
- La collana di Pasqua (Naples, 1896)
- Marie Lacroix (In 1902, his friend G. Martinelli from Brescia organised a libretto by Nicola Daspuro, which comprised four acts) later presented as Nora with three acts (Lucca, 1908)

He also composed an operetta, L'aquila e le colombe.

A Mass for mixed chorus and orchestra, and an Andante religioso, have been recorded on the Bongiovanni label, coupled with a Mass and Andante by Lamberto Landi.

His grandson Gaetano Giani Luporini was also a classical composer.
