= Cavalleria rusticana discography =

This is a discography of Cavalleria rusticana, an opera by Pietro Mascagni. It premiered at the Teatro Costanzi in Rome on 17 May 1890. There have been over 100 full-length recordings of Cavalleria rusticana published since it was first recorded in Germany in 1909. Mascagni himself has conducted the opera in two recordings, the best-known of which is the 1940 EMI recording made to mark the 50th anniversary of the opera's premiere. The performance by the La Scala orchestra and chorus with Lina Bruna Rasa as Santuzza and Beniamino Gigli as Turiddu also has a spoken introduction by Mascagni. Originally released as an LP, it is available on CD under several historical recording labels, including Naxos.

== Recordings ==
| Year | Cast (Santuzza, Turiddu, Alfio, Lucia) | Conductor, Opera house and orchestra | Label |
|---|---|---|---|
| 1927 | May Blyth; Heddle Nash; Harold Williams; Justine Griffiths | Aylmer Buesst; British National Opera Company | CD: Divine Art Historic Sound; Cat: DDH 27805 |
| 1929-1930 | Delia Sanzio; Giovanni Breviario; Piero Biasini; Olga de Franco | Carlo Sabajno; Teatro alla Scala orchestra and chorus | CD: Arkadia; Cat: 78046 |
| 1930 | Giannina Arangi-Lombardi; Antonio Melandri; Gino Lulli; Ida Mannarini | Lorenzo Molajoli; Orchestra Sinfonica di Milano Giuseppe Verdi | CD: Preiser Records; Cat: 90042 |
| 1934 | Iva Pacetti; Beniamino Gigli; Mario Basiola; Giuseppe Nessi | Leone Paci; Teatro alla Scala orchestra and chorus | CD: Opera D'Oro; Cat: OPD-9009 |
| 1950 | Giulietta Simionato; Achille Braschi; Carlo Tagliabue; Liliana Pellegrino | Arturo Basile; Cetra orchestra and chorus | LP: Cetra Records; Cat: |
| 1951 | Valentina Petrova; Eddy Ruhl; Ivan Petrov; Lidia Malani | Erasmo Ghiglia; Maggio Musicale Fiorentino orchestra and chorus | LP: Remington Records; Cat: 199-74 |
| 1953 | Zinka Milanov; Jussi Björling; Robert Merrill; Carol Smith | Renato Cellini; RCA Victor Symphony Orchestra | LP: RCA Victrola; Cat: VIC-6044; CD: RCA Red Seal; Cat: 888750544926 |
| | Margaret Harshaw; Richard Tucker; Frank Guarrera; Thelma Votipka | Fausto Cleva; Metropolitan Opera orchestra and chorus | LP: Columbia; Cat: SL-123; CD: Sony; Cat: |
| | Maria Callas; Giuseppe Di Stefano; Rolando Panerai; Ebe Ticozzi | Tullio Serafin; Teatro alla Scala orchestra and chorus | CD: EMI CD; Cat: 7243 5 56287 2 5 |
| 1954 | Elena Nicolai; Mario del Monaco; Aldo Protti; Anna Maria Anelli | Franco Ghione; Orchestra Sinfonica di Milano Giuseppe Verdi | LP: Decca; Cat: ACL 199-200; CD: Great Opera Performances; Cat: GOP 66314 |
| 1957 | Renata Tebaldi; Jussi Björling; Ettore Bastianini; Rina Corsi | Alberto Erede; Maggio Musicale Fiorentino orchestra and chorus | LP: RCA Victor; Cat: LSC-6059; CD: Decca Cat: 458 2242 |
| 1958 | Caterina Mancini; Gianni Poggi; Aldo Protti; Aurora Cattelani | Ugo Rápalo; Teatro di San Carlo orchestra and chorus | LP: Philips; Cat: SABL 135-7 |
| 1960 | Giulietta Simionato; Mario del Monaco; Cornell MacNeil; Anna di Stasio | Tullio Serafin; Accademia Nazionale di Santa Cecilia orchestra and chorus | CD: Decca; Cat: 467 484-2 |
| 1962 | Victoria de los Ángeles; Franco Corelli; Mario Sereni; Corinna Vozza | Gabriele Santini; Rome Opera orchestra and chorus | CD: EMI CD; Cat: 72438-19968-2-9 |
| 1965 | Fiorenza Cossotto; Carlo Bergonzi; Giangiacomo Guelfi; Maria Gracia Allegri | Herbert von Karajan; Teatro alla Scala orchestra and chorus | CD: Deutsche Grammophon; Cat: 419 257-2 |
| 1966 | Elena Souliotis; Mario del Monaco; Tito Gobbi; Anna di Stasio | Silvio Varviso; Orchestra e Coro di Roma | LP: Decca; Cat: |
| 1976 | Julia Varady; Luciano Pavarotti; Piero Cappuccilli; Ida Bormida | Gianandrea Gavazzeni; National Philharmonic Orchestra; London Voices | CD: Decca Classics; Cat: 00289 414 5902 |
| 1978 | Renata Scotto; Plácido Domingo; Pablo Elvira; Jean Kraft | James Levine; National Philharmonic Orchestra | LP: RCA Red Seal; Cat: CRL1-3091; CD: RCA Red Seal; Cat: 7432139500-2 |
| 1979 | Montserrat Caballé; José Carreras; Matteo Manuguerra; Astrid Varnay | Riccardo Muti; Philharmonia Orchestra | CD: EMI CD; Cat: CMS 7 63650 2 |
| 1981 | Martina Arroyo; Franco Bonisolli; Bernd Weikl; Juliana Falk | Lamberto Gardelli; Bavarian Radio Symphony Orchestra | CD: Eurodisc; Cat: |
| 1983 | Elena Obraztsova; Plácido Domingo; Renato Bruson; Fedora Barbieri | Georges Prêtre; Teatro alla Scala orchestra and chorus | CD: Philips; Cat: 416 137-2 |
| 1989 | Agnes Baltsa; Plácido Domingo; Juan Pons; Vera Baniewicz | Giuseppe Sinopoli; Philharmonia Orchestra | CD: Deutsche Grammophon; Cat: CD 429 568-2 |
| 1990 | Jessye Norman; Giuseppe Giacomini; Dmitri Hvorostovsky; Rosa Laghezza | Semyon Bychkov; Orchestre de Paris | CD: Philips; Cat: 432 105-2 |
| 1992 | Stefka Evstatieva; Giacomo Aragall; Eduard Tumagian; Alzbeta Michalková | Alexander Rahbari; Czecho-Slovak Radio Symphony Orchestra; Slovak Philharmonic Choir | CD: Naxos; Cat: 8 660022 |
| 1997 | Nelly Miricioiu; Dennis O'Neill; Phillip Joll; Elizabeth Bainbridge | David Parry; London Philharmonic Orchestra; Geoffrey Mitchell Choir | CD: Chandos; Cat: CHAN 3004 |
| 2020 | Ezgi Kutlu; Aldo Di Toro; Audun Iversen; Cheryl Studer | Oksana Lyniv; Graz Philharmonic Orchestra; Oper Graz Chorus | CD: Oehms Classics; Cat: OC 987 |
| 2020 | Melody Moore; Brian Jagde; Lester Lynch; Elisabetta Fiorillo | Marek Janowski; Dresden Philharmonic Orchestra; MDR Leipzig Radio Choir | CD: Pentatone; Cat: PTC 5186772 |
| 2020 | Anita Rachvelishvili; Piero Pretti; Luca Salsi; Ronnita Miller | Riccardo Muti; Chicago Symphony Orchestra & Chorus | CD: CSO Resound; Cat: CSOR 901 2201 |
