= Gianni Poggi =

Italian opera singer (1921–1989)

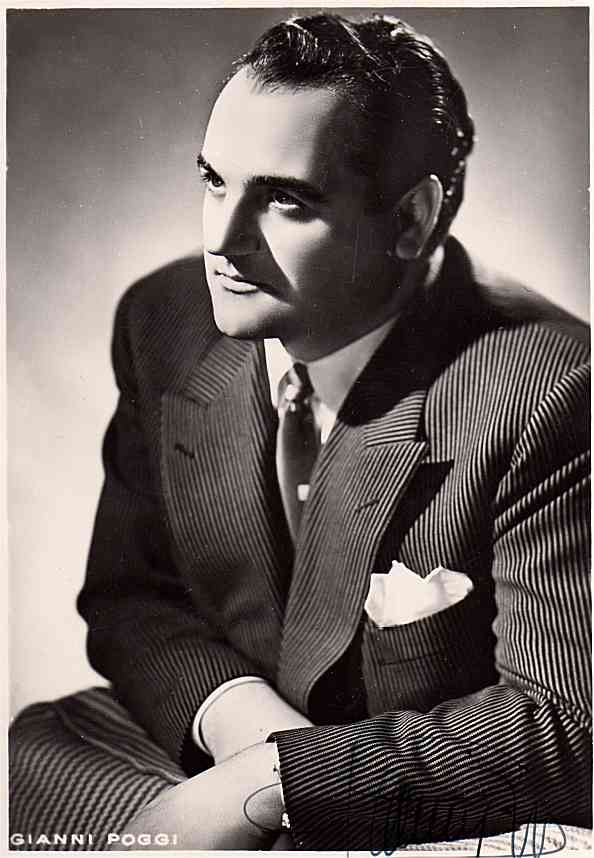
- Born: 4 October 1921; Piacenza, Italy
- Died: 16 December 1989 (aged 68)
- Occupation: Tenor
- Years active: 1947–1969

Gianni Poggi (October 4, 1921 – December 16, 1989) was an Italian tenor, particularly associated with the Italian repertory.

== Biography ==
Gianni Poggi as Riccardo in Un ballo in maschera, Teatro alla Scala, Milan.

Born in Piacenza, Poggi studied first in Bologna with soprano Valeria Manna, and later in Milan with baritone Emilio Ghirardini. He made his debut in Palermo, as Rodolfo, in 1947. He first sang at La Scala in 1948 and appeared there until 1965, his roles included: Riccardo, Enzo, Fernando, Edgardo, Duca di Mantua, Alfredo, Cavaradossi, Pinkerton, Manrico, Fenton, Gabriele Adorno, Radames, Faust, Turiddu, Canio, Lohergrin, Faust, etc..

He also performed in all of Italy's main opera houses, notably in Florence in 1955, in a revival of Donizetti's Dom Sebastien. He portrayed the role of Lohengrin at Arena of Verona in 1949 and in his home town Piacenza in 1963 (both sung in Italian).

Poggi made his debut at the Metropolitan Opera in 1955, in Rigoletto, opposite Robert Merrill and Roberta Peters. He returned for further performances in 1957: Rigoletto again (now with Leonard Warren), Tosca (opposite Antonietta Stella and Walter Cassel, conducted by Dimitri Mitropoulos), La bohème (with Licia Albanese and Ettore Bastianini, conducted by Thomas Schippers), Lucia di Lammermoor (with Lily Pons), La traviata (opposite Renata Tebaldi), and La Gioconda (with Zinka Milanov, Leonard Warren, Cesare Siepi and Regina Resnik).

He was a regular guest at the Vienna State Opera from 1959 to 1964, also appearing at the Berlin State Opera and Monte Carlo Opera. He retired from the stage in 1969, his last role being Faust of Boito's Mefistofele.

Poggi had a fine spinto tenor voice, occasionally inclined to hardness, enabling him to sing both lyric and dramatic roles.

== Discography ==
=== Studio recordings ===
- Donizetti: Lucia di Lammermoor (Wilson, Colzani; Capuana, 1951) Urania
- Boito: Mefistofele (Neri, Noli; Capuana, 1952) Urania
- Puccini: Tosca (Guerrini, Silveri; Molinari-Pradelli, 1952) Cetra
- Ponchielli: La Gioconda (Callas, Barbieri, Silveri, Neri; Votto, 1952) Cetra
- Verdi: La traviata (Tebaldi, Protti; Molinari-Pradelli, 1954) Decca
- Donizetti: La favorite (Simionato, Bastianini, Hines; Erede, 1955) Decca
- Puccini: La bohème (Stella, Capecchi, Modesti; Molinari-Pradelli, 1957) Philips
- Puccini: Tosca (Stella, Taddei; Serafin, 1957) Philips
- Mascagni: Cavalleria rusticana (Mancini, Protti; Rapalo, 1958) Philips
- Leoncavallo: Pagliacci (Beltrami, Protti; Rapalo, 1958) Philips
- Verdi: Un ballo in maschera (Stella, Bastianini, Lazzarini; Gavazzeni, 1960) Deutsche Grammophon
- Puccini: La bohème (Scotto, Gobbi, Modesti; Votto, 1961) Deutsche Grammophon

=== Selected live performances ===
- La Bohème (highlights), La Scala 1949 (Margherita Carosio, Paolo Silveri, Alda Noni; Victor De Sabata) ed. Cetra/Myto
- Tosca (highlights), Rio 1951 (Maria Callas, Paolo Silveri; Antonino Votto) ed. Voce/Archipel
- La bohème, Barcelona 1954 (Renata Tebaldi, Manuel Ausensi, Ornella Rovero, Giulio Neri; Ugo Rapalo) ed. Premiere Opera
- Dom Sebastien, Firenze 1955 (Fedora Barbieri, Giulio Neri, Enzo Mascherini; Carlo Maria Giulini) ed. Cetra/MRF/Walhall
- La Gioconda, Met 1957 (Zinka Milanov, Leonard Warren, Nell Rankin, Cesare Siepi; Fausto Cleva) ed. Arkadia/Walhall
- Mefistofele, La Scala 1958 (Cesare Siepi, Anna De Cavalieri, Cesy Broggini, Fiorenza Cossotto; Antonino Votto) ed. Cetra/Melodram/Gala

== Videography ==
- Puccini: Tosca (Tebaldi, Guelfi; Basile) 1961 [live-Tokio] VAI
- Verdi: Rigoletto (Protti, Tucci; Basile) 1961 [live-Tokio] VAI

== Sources ==
- Grove Music Online, Elizabeth Forbes, Oxford University Press, 2008.
