= Renata Tebaldi =

Italian opera singer (1922–2004)

Renata Tebaldi OMRI
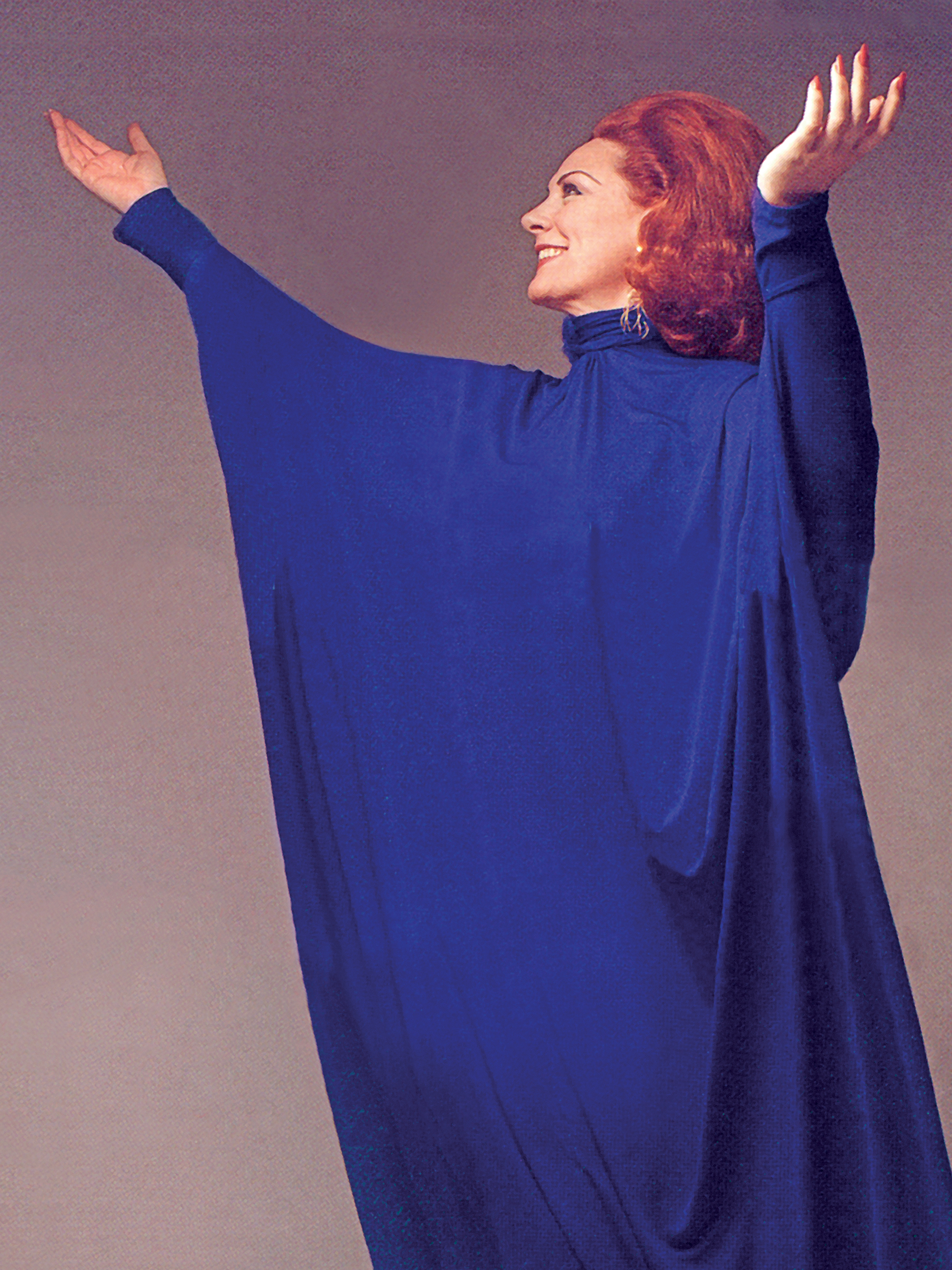
- Tebaldi in 1974
- Born: Renata Ersilia Clotilde Tebaldi; 1 February 1922; Pesaro, Marche, Kingdom of Italy
- Died: 19 December 2004 (aged 82); San Marino, San Marino
- Other name: la Voce d'Angelo
- Education: Conservatorio Statale di Musica "Gioachino Rossini"
- Occupation: Operatic soprano
- Years active: 1944–1976
- Awards: Grammy Award for Best Classical Vocal Solo, 1959; Grammy Award for Best Opera Recording (joint), 1961; Cavaliere di Gran Croce OMRI; Commandeur des Arts et des Lettres, France

Renata Tebaldi (US: /təˈbɑːldi/ tə-BAHL-dee; Italian: [reˈnaːta teˈbaldi]; 1 February 1922 – 19 December 2004) was an Italian lirico-spinto soprano popular in the post-war period, and especially prominent as one of the stars of La Scala, San Carlo and, especially, the Metropolitan Opera. Often considered among the great opera singers of the 20th century, she focused primarily on the verismo roles of the lyric and dramatic repertoires. Italian conductor Arturo Toscanini called her voice la voce d'angelo ("the voice of an angel"), and La Scala music director Riccardo Muti called her "one of the greatest performers with one of the most extraordinary voices in the field of opera."

== Early years and education ==
Born in Pesaro, in the north of Marche, Tebaldi was the daughter of cellist Teobaldo Tebaldi and Giuseppina Barbieri, a nurse. Her parents separated before her birth and Tebaldi grew up with her mother in her maternal grandparents' home in Langhirano, near Parma in Emilia-Romagna.

Stricken with polio at the age of three, Tebaldi became interested in music and sang with the church choir in Langhirano. Her mother sent her, at age 13, for piano lessons with Giuseppina Passani in Parma, who took the initiative that Tebaldi study voice with Italo Brancucci at the Parma Conservatory. She was admitted to the conservatory at 17, where she studied with Brancucci and Ettore Campogalliani. She later transferred to Liceo musicale Rossini in Pesaro, taking lessons with Carmen Melis, and on her suggestion with Giuseppe Pais. She then studied with Beverley Peck Johnson in New York City.

== Italian career ==
Renata Tebaldi (photo with 1949 dedication)

Tebaldi made her stage debut as Elena in Boito's Mefistofele in Rovigo in 1944. Wartime conditions made for a difficult trip, with Tebaldi partly travelling by horse cart to Rovigo, and her return trip coming under machine-gun fire. Her early career was also marked by a performance in Parma in La bohème, L'amico Fritz and Andrea Chénier. She caused a stir when in 1946 she made her debut as Desdemona in Verdi's Otello alongside Francesco Merli as the title role in Trieste.

Her major breakthrough came in 1946 when she auditioned for Arturo Toscanini, who says she had la voce d'angelo ("voice of an angel"). Tebaldi made her La Scala debut that year at the concert marking the reopening of the theatre after World War II. She sang the "Prayer" ("Dal tuo stellato soglio") from Rossini's biblical opera, Mosè in Egitto, and the soprano part in Verdi's Te Deum.

She was given the roles of Margherita and Elena in Mefistofele and Elsa in Lohengrin in 1946. The next year she appeared in La bohème and as Eva in Die Meistersinger. Toscanini encouraged her to sing the role of Aida and invited her to rehearse it in his studio. She believed the role was reserved for a dramatic soprano, but Toscanini convinced her otherwise, and she debuted in the role at La Scala in 1950 with Mario del Monaco and Fedora Barbieri, conducted by Antonino Votto. It was the greatest success in her budding career and led to international opportunities. During the first decade of her career, Tebaldi's repertoire included roles by Rossini, Spontini, Handel, Mozart, Wagner, Gounod, Mascagni, Tchaikovsky and contemporary composers such as Refice, Casavola and Cilea.

Tebaldi provided Sophia Loren's singing in the film version of Aida (1953).

== International career ==
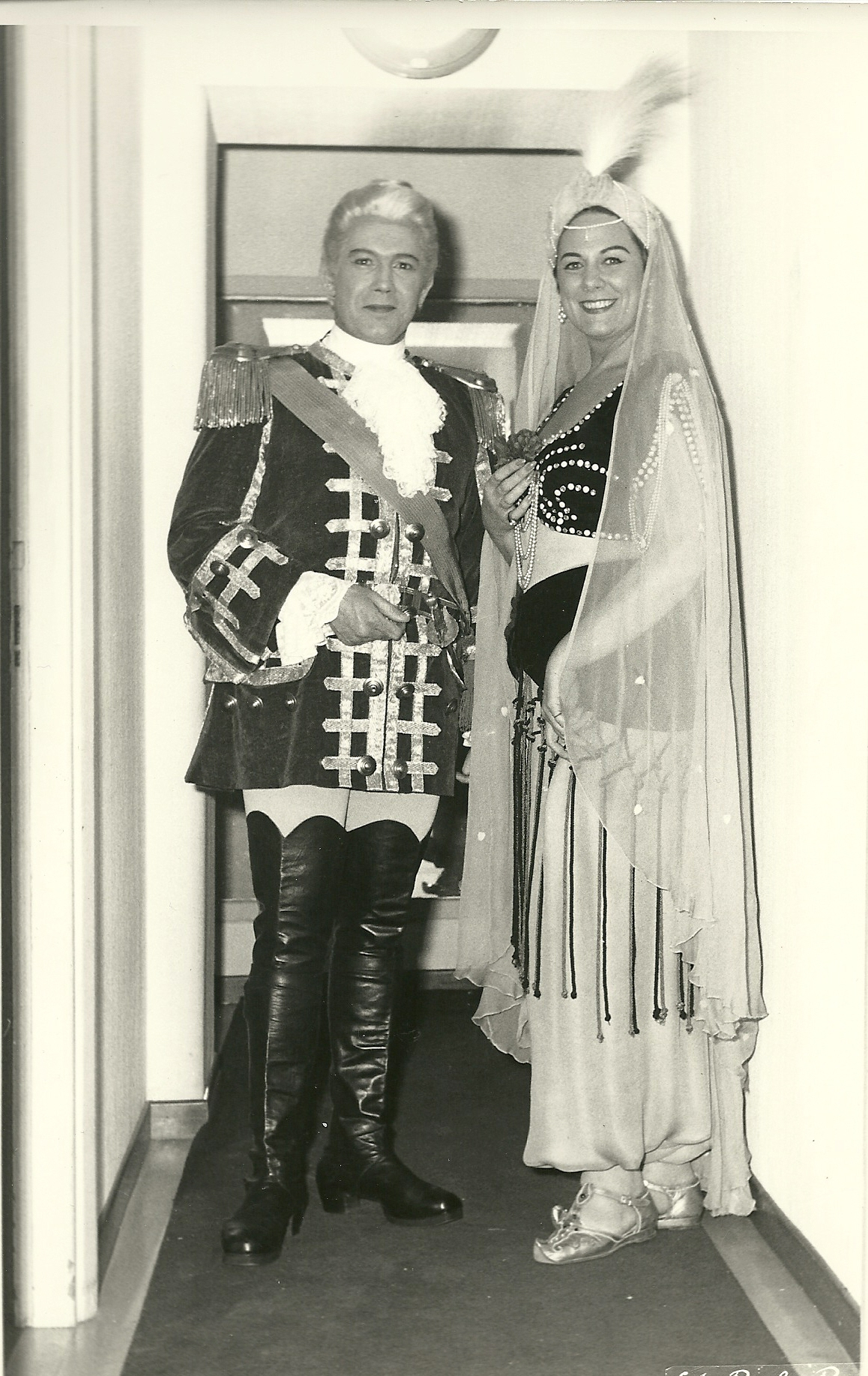
Tebaldi with Giuseppe Di Stefano in Rome, 1960

Tebaldi went on a concert tour with the La Scala ensemble in 1950, first to the Edinburgh Festival and then to London, where she made her debut as Desdemona in two performances of Otello at the Royal Opera House and in the Verdi Requiem, both conducted by Victor de Sabata.

=== The Met ===
Tebaldi made her American debut in 1950 as Aida at the San Francisco Opera; her Metropolitan Opera debut took place on 31 January 1955, as Desdemona opposite Mario Del Monaco's Otello. For some 20 years she made the Met the focus of her activities. For the 1962-1963 season, she convinced Met director Rudolf Bing to stage a revival of Cilea's Adriana Lecouvreur, an opera Bing said he "detested". Tebaldi was not in top form and cancelled performances; and, as Bing was quoted in 1000 Nights at the Opera, "We had to do the wretched thing without her." However, her Lecouvreur was a practical move for the Met, as she was "the greatest box-office draw since Flagstad", according to Francis Robinson, then assistant manager of ticket sales. Tebaldi however returned triumphantly to the role of Adriana for the opening night of the 1968-69 season. The MET scored a box office record of $126,000.

One of the public's favourite Tebaldi roles was Minnie in Puccini's La fanciulla del West of which she sang only five performances in February and March 1970. When she made her debut in the role at the Met, she was told that, as all Minnies do, she would have to enter in the 3rd act on horseback. Tebaldi, who had a lifelong fear of horses, refused to go near the animal until she was sure he was safe. At her first rehearsal, she approached him, patted his mane, and said, "Well, Mr. Horse, I am Tebaldi. You and I are going to be friends, eh?" She conquered her fear and the performances were successful.

She sang more at the Met and far less elsewhere. She developed a special rapport with the Met audiences and became known as "Miss Sold Out", as her name on the marquee was considered a performance that could hardly be matched. She sang there some 270 times in La bohème, Madama Butterfly, Tosca, Manon Lescaut, La fanciulla del West, Otello, La forza del destino, Simon Boccanegra, Falstaff, Andrea Chénier, Adriana Lecouvreur, La Gioconda, and as Violetta in a production of La Traviata created specially for her. Puccini's Tosca was her most regular role there, with 45 performances. She was the Leonora in La forza del destino on the night in 1960 when Leonard Warren suddenly died mid-performance; and she was Adriana Lecouvreur on the night Placido Domingo made his Met debut in 1968. She made her last appearance there on 8 January 1973 as Desdemona in Otello; it was the role in which she made her Met debut 18 years earlier, and which had become one of her signature roles.

Tebaldi was widely admired by the American operatic public. She did not become a classically temperamental diva, but trusted her artistic instincts. Rudolf Bing, referring to her more assertive side, famously said of her, "She has dimples of iron".

=== Tebaldi and Callas ===
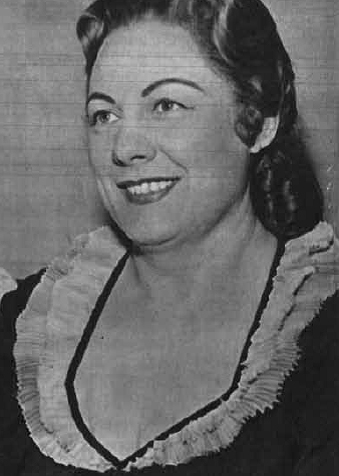
Renata Tebaldi, 1961

During the early 1950s, controversy arose regarding a supposed rivalry between Tebaldi and the Greek-American soprano Maria Callas.

The contrast between Callas's often unconventional vocal qualities and Tebaldi's classically beautiful sound resurrected an argument as old as opera itself, namely, the beauty of sound versus the expressive use of sound.

In 1951, Tebaldi and Callas were jointly booked for a vocal recital in Rio de Janeiro, Brazil. Although the singers supposedly agreed that neither would perform encores, Tebaldi took two, and Callas was reportedly incensed.

This incident began the rivalry, which reached a fever pitch in the mid-1950s, at times even engulfing the two women themselves, who were said by their more fanatical followers to have engaged in verbal barbs in each other's direction. Tebaldi was quoted as saying, "I have one thing that Callas doesn't have: a heart" while Callas was quoted in Time magazine as saying that comparing her with Tebaldi was like "comparing Champagne with Cognac. No, with Coca Cola". However, witnesses to the interview stated that Callas only said "champagne with cognac", and it was a bystander who quipped, "No, with Coca-Cola", but the Time reporter attributed the latter comment to Callas.

According to John Ardoin, however, these two singers should never have been compared. Tebaldi was trained by Carmen Melis, a verismo specialist, and she was rooted in the early 20th-century Italian school of singing just as firmly as Callas was rooted in 19th-century bel canto.

Callas was a dramatic soprano, whereas Tebaldi considered herself essentially a lyric soprano. Callas and Tebaldi generally sang a different repertoire: in the early years of her career, Callas concentrated on the heavy dramatic soprano roles and later in her career on the bel canto repertoire, whereas Tebaldi concentrated on late Verdi and verismo roles. They shared a few roles, including Tosca in Puccini's opera and La Gioconda, which Tebaldi performed only late in her career.

The alleged rivalry aside, Callas made remarks appreciative of Tebaldi, and vice versa. During an interview with Norman Ross in Chicago, Callas said, "I admire Tebaldi's tone; it's beautiful – also some beautiful phrasing. Sometimes, I actually wish I had her voice." Francis Robinson of the Met wrote of an incident in which Tebaldi asked him to recommend a recording of La Gioconda to help her learn the role. Being fully aware of the alleged rivalry, he recommended Zinka Milanov's version. A few days later, he went to visit Tebaldi, only to find her sitting by the speakers, listening intently to Callas's recording. She then looked up at him and asked, "Why didn't you tell me Maria's was the best?" According to Time magazine, when Callas quit La Scala, "Tebaldi made a surprising maneuver: she announced that she would not sing at La Scala without Callas. 'I sing only for artistic reasons; it is not my custom to sing against anybody', she said."

Callas visited Tebaldi after a performance of Adriana Lecouvreur at the Met in 1968, and the two were reunited. In 1978, Tebaldi spoke warmly of her late colleague and summarized this rivalry:

This rivality [sic] was really building from the people of the newspapers and the fans. But I think it was very good for both of us, because the publicity was so big and it created a very big interest about me and Maria and was very good in the end. But I don't know why they put this kind of rivality [sic], because the voice was very different. She was really something unusual. And I remember that I was very young artist too, and I stayed near the radio every time that I know that there was something on radio by Maria.

== Voice ==
Tebaldi's voice was reputed to be one of the most beautiful of the day, with rich tones. At the start of her career, her audition in bomb-ravaged La Scala's reopening was marked by Arturo Toscanini praising Tebaldi, calling her la Voce d'Angelo with enthusiastic "Brava!"s and applauds.

British musicologist Alan Blyth posited that in posterity, Tebaldi holds a position of being one of the last and best spinto sopranos of the last 50 years, due to Tebaldi's successors in the fach not having the right vocal equipment for her parts. Blyth attributed this in part to Tebaldi's recordings and her live performances onstage. Tebaldi's voice added a frisson of urgency when she sang in an opera house. This was noted in two of her performances as Leonora in Verdi's La forza del destino, evident in a recording done at the Maggio Musicale Fiorentino in 1953, where conductor Dimitri Mitropoulos urged her to great heights of vocal and dramatic achievement, and a live video recording in Naples.

Montserrat Caballe remarked on an interview that Tebaldi, "She was our Aida, our Traviata, our Manon Lescaut. She was all the roles, and she was the most perfect human voice we ever heard", likewise, Robert Merrill and Licia Albanese commented on the sumptuous and beautiful quality of Tebaldi's voice.

Tebaldi withdrew from performances in 1963 to restudy, made in part due to the emotional stress after eighteen years of singing. After thirteen months of reworking her voice, Tebaldi possessed an unmistakable metallic edge in her voice which only strengthened over the years. In her mid-to-later career, Tebaldi shifted from being a spinto to one with a near-dramatic sound. Adding La Gioconda in her repertoire, Tebaldi had chest notes carried high, bearing ample size and strength but little of the known beauty of Tebaldi's tone. Similarly, in her recorded Puccini roles at that time, one can't always count on the "floats" being easily produced or accurately pitched.

Some critics of Tebaldi have commented adversely on her seemingly incomplete technique; sometimes she took on strident, full-voiced top notes when tackling material above the high B-flat, and had occasional lapses in her pitch. For most audiences however, there was the sheer and deep richness of Tebaldi's voice, her melting legato phrases, the deeply expressive but never maudlin quality of singing, the beauty of her floated pianissimo high notes, and her temperament when dwelling in moments of dramatic intensity. Tebaldi's often mentioned alleged rival, Maria Callas, said in an interview, "I admire Tebaldi's tone; it's beautiful – also some beautiful phrasing. Sometimes, I actually wish I had her voice."

Tebaldi herself mentioned that recording presented challenges for her, as she missed the stimulation of an audience, and her powerful voice would often cause sound engineers to insist that she turn away from the microphone at moments of climactic intensity.

== Personal life ==
Tebaldi enjoyed a beloved relationship with her mother, who helped nurture her and was devoted to her career and well-being from an early age. Her mother's death in 1957 was a huge blow to Tebaldi, whose grief was unbearable and it took effort to go back to the stage.

Tebaldi never married. In a 1995 interview with The Times, she said she had no regrets about her single life. "I was in love many times," she said. "This is very good for a woman." But she added, "How could I have been a wife, a mother and a singer? Who takes care of the piccolini when you go around the world? Your children would not call you Mama, but Renata." She also wrote, "I started my career at 22 and finished it at 54. Thirty-two years of success, satisfaction and sacrifices. Singing was my life's scope to the point that I could never have a family." Tebaldi had a short relationship with bass Nicola Rossi-Lemeni. A longer one with conductor Arturo Basile was formed in 1958, Basile reportedly saying their plans to marry were ended by Tebaldi in 1962 due to Basile's behaviour.

== Later years ==
By the end of her career, Tebaldi had sung in 1,262 performances: 1,048 complete operas and 214 concerts.

Tebaldi retired from the opera stage in 1973 as Desdemona in Verdi's Otello at the Metropolitan Opera, the same role she debuted there nearly 20 years previously. She gave recitals around the globe. In one recital held in Manila with frequent partner Franco Corelli, Tebaldi's voice cracked in a Manon Lescaut aria; she then massaged her throat and genuflected to great applause from the audience. In January 1976, she gave her last recital in New York's Carnegie Hall. She received six curtain calls and standing ovations from the audience. She then moved out of her New York apartment, her home for many years during her stint at the Met, and returned to Italy, where she gave her final public appearance in a vocal recital in La Scala in May 1976. Regarding her decision to retire, Tebaldi said that she stopped singing while she still had a powerful voice to avoid "the mortifying season of decline".

She spent the majority of her last days in Milan. She died on 19 December 2004 at age 82 at her home in San Marino. She is buried in the Tebaldi family chapel at Mattaleto cemetery in Langhirano. At her death, audiences at Venice's La Fenice observed a moment of silence in her memory. Luciano Pavarotti said, "Farewell, Renata, your memory and your voice will be etched on my heart forever".

== Honours ==
Tebaldi won the first Grammy Award Best Classical Performance - Vocal Soloist in 1959 for her album Operatic Recital. Their joint recording of Puccini's Turandot, conducted by Erich Leinsdorf and starring Birgit Nilsson as Turandot, Jussi Björling as Calaf, Tebaldi as Liù and Giorgio Tozzi as Timur with the Rome Opera Orchestra won the Grammy Award for Best Opera Recording in 1961.

She became a member of the Order of Merit of the Italian Republic as a Grand Officer in 1968 and a Knight Grand Cross in 1992. She was also made a Commander of the Ordre des Arts et des Lettres from France.

Proclamation of "Tebaldi day" was made in her honour on 11 December 1995 by Rudy Giuliani, then Mayor of New York City.

== Legacy ==
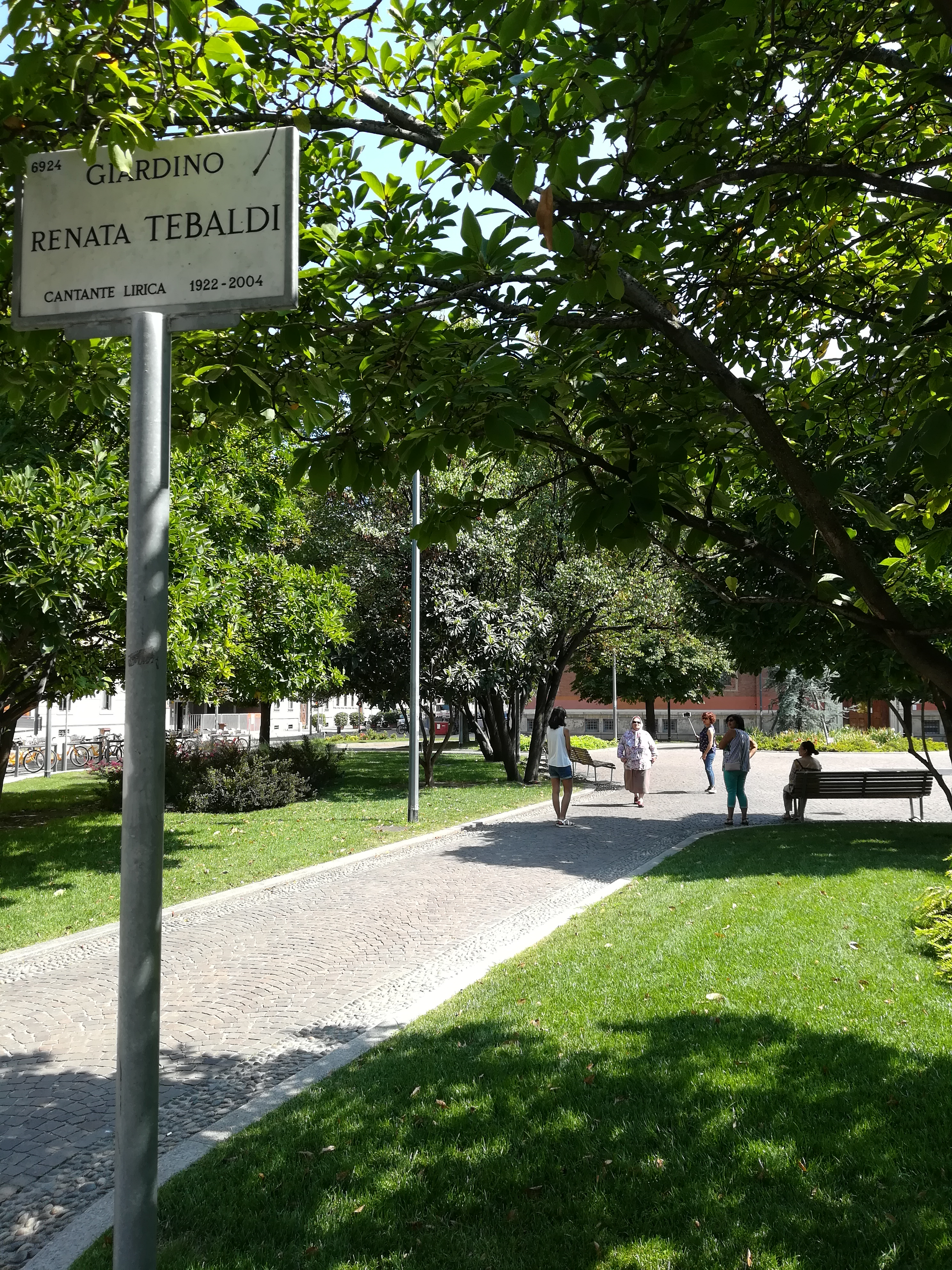
Garden in Milan dedicated to Renata Tebaldi

From February 2010 until 2013, the 15th-century Castle of Torrechiara – Langhirano – hosted within its rooms an exhibition dedicated to Renata Tebaldi. This “Castle for a Queen” unveils the many sides of this great diva, whose artistic and personal life remains on display. The items showcased followed her over the arc of time as she spread the world-class tradition of Italian lyrical art, all the way from the beginning of her career and throughout her artistic achievements. The exhibition is presented by the Renata Tebaldi Committee in collaboration with the Superintendence of Environmental Heritage and Landscape of the province of Parma and Piacenza, the Regio Theatre Foundation of Parma and the Municipality of Langhirano and with the patronage of the province of Parma. On 7 June 2014, the museum dedicated to Renata Tebaldi was inaugurated in the stables of Villa Pallavicino in Busseto. Tebaldi was awarded a star for recording in 1960 on the Hollywood Walk of Fame in 6628 Hollywood Boulevard, Hollywood, California.

== Discography ==
- Lohengrin (Richard Wagner): conducted by Franco Capuana, with Giacinto Prandelli and Elena Nicolai. (1947). Performed in Italian.
- Andrea Chénier (Umberto Giordano): Victor de Sabata conducting the Teatro alla Scala, with Mario Del Monaco and Paolo Silveri. (1949)
- Giulio Cesare (George Frideric Handel): Herbert Albert conducting the Orchestra del Teatro San Carlo, with Cesare Siepi and Elena Nicolai. (1950)
- Tannhäuser (Richard Wagner): Karl Boehm conducting the Orchestra del Teatro San Carlo, with Hans Beirer and Carlo Tagliabue. (1950). Performed in Italian.
- La traviata (Giuseppe Verdi): Antonino Votto conducting the Orchestra-Theatro Municipal do Rio de Janeiro, with Giuseppe Campora and Paolo Silveri. (1950) (Gramophone Company)
- Andrea Chénier (Umberto Giordano): Gabriele Santini conducting the Orchestra del Teatro San Carlo, with Mario Filippeschi and Carlo Tagliabue. (1951)
- La bohème (Giacomo Puccini): Gabriele Santini conducting the Orchestra del Teatro San Carlo, with Giacomo Lauri-Volpi and Tito Gobbi. (1951)
- Falstaff (opera) (Giuseppe Verdi): Victor de Sabata conducting the Teatro alla Scala, with Mariano Stabile and Cesare Valletti. (1951) (Urania Records)
- Fernand Cortez (Gaspare Spontini): Gabriele Santini conducting the Orchestra del Teatro San Carlo, with Gino Penno and Italo Tajo. (1951). Performed in Italian.
- Giovanna d'Arco (Giuseppe Verdi): Gabriele Santini conducting the Orchestra del Teatro San Carlo, with Gino Penno and Ugo Savarese. (1951)
- Giovanna d'Arco (Giuseppe Verdi): Alfredo Simonetto conducting the RAI Milano Orchestra, with Carlo Bergonzi and Rolando Panerai. (1951)
- La bohème (Giacomo Puccini): Alberto Erede conducting the Orchestra dell'Accademia Nazionale di Santa Cecilia, with Giacinto Prandelli and Fernando Corena. (1951) (Decca Records)
- Madama Butterfly (Giacomo Puccini): Alberto Erede conducting the Orchestra dell'Accademia Nazionale di Santa Cecilia, with Giuseppe Campora, Giovanni Inghilleri and Nell Rankin. (1951) (London Records)
- Adriana Lecouvreur (Francesco Cilea): Gabriele Santini conducting the Orchestra del Teatro San Carlo, with Gianni Poggi and Augosto Romani. (1952)
- Falstaff (opera) (Giuseppe Verdi): Victor de Sabata conducting the Teatro alla Scala, with Mariano Stabile and Cesare Valletti. (1952)
- Otello (Giuseppe Verdi): Gabriele Santini conducting the Orchestra del Teatro San Carlo, with Ramón Vinay and Gino Bechi. (1952)
- Le siège de Corinthe (Gioachino Rossini): Gabriele Santini conducting the Orchestra del Teatro San Carlo, with Miriam Pirazzini and Mario Petri. (1952). Performed in Italian.
- La traviata (Giuseppe Verdi): Gabriele Santini conducting the Orchestra del Teatro San Carlo, with Giuseppe Campora and Pina Angelici. (1952)
- La traviata (Giuseppe Verdi): Carlo Maria Giulini conducting the RAI Milano Orchestra, with Giacinto Prandelli and Liliana Pellegrino. (1952)
- Aida (Giuseppe Verdi): Alberto Erede conducting the Orchestra dell'Accademia Nazionale di Santa Cecilia, with Mario del Monaco and Ebe Stignani. (1952) (Decca Records)
- Tosca (Giacomo Puccini): Alberto Erede conducting the Orchestra dell'Accademia Nazionale di Santa Cecilia, with Giuseppe Campora and Enzo Mascherini. (1952) (Decca Records)
- Aida (Giuseppe Verdi): Giuseppe Morelli conducting the RAI Milano Orchestra, with Giuseppe Campora and Ebe Stignani. (1953)
- Aida (Giuseppe Verdi): Tullio Serafin conducting the Orchestra del Teatro San Carlo, with Gino Penno and Ebe Stignani. (1953)
- Cecilia (Licinio Refice): Licinio Refice conducting the Orchestra del Teatro San Carlo, with Pina Ulisse and Alvino Misciano. (1953)
- La forza del destino (Giuseppe Verdi): Dimitri Mitropoulos conducting the Teatro Comunale Orchestra, with Mario Del Monaco, Silvio Maionica and Giorgio Tozzi. (1953)
- La Wally (Alfredo Catalani): Carlo Maria Giulini conducting the Teatro alla Scala, with Mario Del Monaco and Giangiacomo Guelfi. (1953)
- Andrea Chénier (Umberto Giordano): Arturo Basile conducting the RAI Torino Orchestra, with José Soler and Ugo Savarese. (1953) (Cetra Records)
- Tosca (Giacomo Puccini): Oliviero De Fabritiis conducting the Orchestra-Theatro Municipal do Rio de Janeiro, with Giuseppe Di Stefano and Tito Gobbi. (1953) (Decca Records)
- Le nozze di Figaro (Wolfgang Amadeus Mozart): Ionel Perlea conducting the Orchestra del Teatro San Carlo, with Giulietta Simionato, Italo Tajo and Alda Noni. (1954). Performed in Italian.
- Manon Lescaut (Giacomo Puccini): Francesco Molinari-Pradelli conducting the Orchestra dell'Accademia Nazionale di Santa Cecilia, with Mario Del Monaco, Mario Boriello, Fernando Corena. Coro dell'Accademia Nazionale di Santa Cecilia. (1954) (Decca Records).
- La traviata (Giuseppe Verdi): Francesco Molinari-Pradelli conducting the Orchestra dell'Accademia Nazionale di Santa Cecilia, with Gianni Poggi and Angela Vercelli. (1954) (Decca)
- Turandot (Giacomo Puccini): Alberto Erede conducting the Orchestra dell'Accademia Nazionale di Santa Cecilia, with Inge Borkh, Mario del Monaco and Nicola Zaccaria. (1955) (Decca Records)
- Tosca (Giacomo Puccini): Dimitri Mitropoulos conducting, with Leonard Warren, Fernando Corena, Richard Tucker. 7 January 1956 Metropolitan Opera Historic Broadcast Recording.
- Il trovatore (Giuseppe Verdi): Alberto Erede conducting the Grand Théâtre de Genève Orchestra, with Mario Del Monaco and Giulietta Simionato. (1956) (Decca)
- La traviata (Giuseppe Verdi): Fausto Cleva conducting the Metropolitan Opera Orchestra in 1957, with Giuseppe Campora and Leonard Warren.
- Cavalleria rusticana (Pietro Mascagni): Alberto Erede conducting the Orchestra and Chorus of the Maggio Musicale Fiorentino in 1957, with Jussi Björling and Ettore Bastianini. (RCA/London Records)
- Andrea Chénier (Umberto Giordano): Gianandrea Gavazzeni conducting the Orchestra dell'Accademia Nazionale di Santa Cecilia, with Mario Del Monaco, Fiorenza Cossotto, Ettore Bastianini. Coro dell'Accademia Nazionale di Santa Cecilia. (1957) (Decca).
- Madama Butterfly (Giacomo Puccini): Angelo Questa conducting the Orchestra del Teatro San Carlo, with Gianni Raimondi, Giuseppe Valdengo, Anna Di Stasio. (1958)
- La fanciulla del West (Giacomo Puccini): Franco Capuana conducting the Orchestra dell'Accademia Nazionale di Santa Cecilia, with Mario Del Monaco, Cornell MacNeil, Giorgio Tozzi. Coro dell'Accademia Nazionale di Santa Cecilia. (1958) (Decca Import).
- Madama Butterfly (Giacomo Puccini): Tullio Serafin conducting the Orchestra dell'Accademia Nazionale di Santa Cecilia, with Carlo Bergonzi, Fiorenza Cossotto, Enzo Sordello. Coro dell'Accademia Nazionale di Santa Cecilia. (1958) (Decca Records).
- Mefistofele (Arrigo Boito): Tullio Serafin conducting the Coro e Orchestra dell'Accademia Nazionale di Santa Cecilia, with Mario Del Monaco, Cesare Siepi. (1958) (Decca).
- La bohème (Giacomo Puccini): Tullio Serafin conducting the Orchestra dell'Accademia Nazionale di Santa Cecilia, with Carlo Bergonzi, Gianna D'Angelo, Ettore Bastianini. Coro dell'Accademia Nazionale di Santa Cecilia. (1959) (Decca Records).
- Tosca (Giacomo Puccini): Francesco Molinari-Pradelli conducting the Coro e Orchestra dell'Accademia Nazionale di Santa Cecilia, with Mario Del Monaco and George London. (1959) (Decca Records).
- Tosca (Giacomo Puccini): Gianandrea Gavazzeni conducting the La Scala Theatre Orchestra, with Giuseppe di Stefano and Tito Gobbi. La Scala Theatre Chorus. Recorded live at La Scala in 1959. Opera d'Oro.
- Aida (Giuseppe Verdi): Herbert von Karajan conducting the Vienna Philharmonic Orchestra, with Carlo Bergonzi, Giulietta Simionato, Cornell MacNeil. Singverein der Gesellschaft der Musikfreunde. (1959) (Decca Legends).
- Turandot (Giacomo Puccini): Erich Leinsdorf conducting the Rome Opera Orchestra, with Birgit Nilsson, Jussi Bjoerling and Giorgio Tozzi. Rome Opera Chorus. (1960) (RCA).
- Otello (Giuseppe Verdi): Herbert von Karajan conducting the Vienna Philharmonic Orchestra, with Mario Del Monaco, Aldo Protti, Nello Romanato. Singverein der Gesellschaft der Musikfreunde. (1961) (Decca Legends).
- Adriana Lecouvreur (Francesco Cilea): Franco Capuana conducting the Orchestra dell'Accademia Nazionale di Santa Cecilia, with Mario Del Monaco, Giulietta Simionato, Giulio Fioravanti. Coro dell'Accademia Nazionale di Santa Cecilia. (1961) (Decca).
- Il trittico (Giacomo Puccini): Lamberto Gardelli conducting Chorus and Orchestra of the Maggio Musicale Fiorentino, with Giulietta Simionato, Mario del Monaco, Robert Merrill, Fernando Corena (1962) (London Records)
- Adriana Lecouvreur (Francesco Cilea): Silvio Varviso conducting the Metropolitan Opera Orchestra, with Franco Corelli and William Wilderman. (1963)
- Tosca (Giacomo Puccini): Fausto Cleva conducting the Metropolitan Opera Orchestra, with Franco Corelli and Tito Gobbi. (1964)
- Don Carlos (opera) (Giuseppe Verdi): Georg Solti conducting Orchestra of the Royal Opera House, with Carlo Bergonzi, Nicolai Ghiaurov, Dietrich Fischer-Dieskau, Grace Bumbry (1965) (Decca)
- La Gioconda (opera) (Amilcare Ponchielli): Fausto Cleva conducting the Metropolitan Opera Orchestra, with Franco Corelli, Cornell MacNeil, Biserka Cvejić and Cesare Siepi. (1966). (Stradivarius Records)
- Otello (Giuseppe Verdi): Alberto Erede conducting the Teatro Regio Orchestra, with Mario Del Monaco and Tito Gobbi. (1966)
- Otello (Giuseppe Verdi): Anton Guadagno conducting the Philadelphia Lyric Opera Orchestra, with Jon Vickers and Louis Quilico. (1967)
- La Gioconda (opera) (Amilcare Ponchielli): Lamberto Gardelli conducting the Orchestra dell'Accademia Nazionale di Santa Cecilia, with Carlo Bergonzi, Robert Merrill, Marilyn Horne and Oralia Domínguez. (1968). (Decca Records)
- La Gioconda (opera) (Amilcare Ponchielli): Fausto Cleva conducting Metropolitan Opera Orchestra, with Carlo Bergonzi, Cornell MacNeil and Fiorenza Cossotto. (1968).
- La Wally (Alfredo Catalani): Fausto Cleva conducting Orchestra of the American Opera Society, with Carlo Bergonzi, Peter Glossop. (1968).
- La Wally (Alfredo Catalani): Fausto Cleva conducting L'Orchestre National de l'Opéra de Monte-Carlo, with Mario Del Monaco, Piero Cappuccilli, Justino Diaz. Coro Lirico di Torino. (1968) (Decca Records).
- Adriana Lecouvreur (Francesco Cilea): Fausto Cleva conducting the Metropolitan Opera Orchestra, with Franco Corelli and Morley Meredith. (1969)
- La bohème (Giacomo Puccini): Anton Guadagno conducting the Philadelphia Lyric Opera Orchestra, with Franco Corelli and Seymour Schwartzman. (1969)
- La bohème (Giacomo Puccini): Anton Guadagno conducting the Philadelphia Lyric Opera Orchestra, with Franco Corelli and Alan Wagner. (1969)
- La bohème (Giacomo Puccini): Fausto Cleva conducting the Metropolitan Opera Orchestra, with Richard Tucker and Gene Boucher. (1970)
- La fanciulla del west (Giacomo Puccini): Jan Behr conducting the Metropolitan Opera Orchestra, with Sándor Kónya and Anselmo Colzani. (1970)
- Simon Boccanegra (Giuseppe Verdi): James Levine conducting the Cleveland Orchestra, with Cornell MacNeil and Ezio Flagello. (1970) (Legato Classics)
- Un ballo in maschera (Giuseppe Verdi): Bruno Bartoletti conducting the Orchestra dell'Accademia Nazionale di Santa Cecilia, with Luciano Pavarotti and Sherrill Milnes. (1970) (Decca Records)
- Otello (Giuseppe Verdi): Anton Guadagno conducting the Philadelphia Lyric Opera Orchestra, with Jon Vickers and Peter Glossop. (1972)
- Falstaff (opera) (Giuseppe Verdi): Christoph von Dohnányi conducting the Metropolitan Opera Orchestra. with Tito Gobbi and Luigi Alva. (1972)
- Otello (Giuseppe Verdi): James Levine conducting the Metropolitan Opera Orchestra. with James McCracken and Sherrill Milnes. (1973)
