= Un ballo in maschera discography =

Discography of Giuseppe Verdi's opera

This is a discography of Giuseppe Verdi's opera, Un ballo in maschera. It was first performed at the Teatro Apollo in Rome on 17 February 1859.

However, prior to the version of the opera which appears in the recordings below, Verdi had been using the title of Gustavo III and, when he was prohibited from using that title and after he was forced to make significant changes, the original version disappeared. It has been reconstructed, performed, and recorded as Gustavo III (Verdi).

On the 5 Oct 2013 broadcast of BBC 3'S CD Review - Building a Library, musicologist Roger Parker surveyed recordings of Un Ballo in Maschera and recommended the 1975 recording by the New Philharmonia Orchestra, Chorus of the Royal House Covent Garden, Haberdashers' Aske's School Girls’ Choir, Riccardo Muti (conductor), as the best available choice.

== Recordings ==
Year	Cast (Riccardo, Amelia, Renato, Oscar, Ulrica)	Conductor, Opera house and orchestra	Label
1940	Jussi Björling; Zinka Milanov; Alexander Svéd; Stella Andreva; Bruna Castagna	Ettore Panizza; Metropolitan Opera orchestra and chorus (Recorded on 14 December)	Streaming audio: Met Opera on Demand; CD: Myto; Cat: 00008
1944	Jan Peerce; Zinka Milanov; Leonard Warren; Kerstin Thorborg; Frances Greer	Bruno Walter; Metropolitan Opera orchestra and chorus (Recorded on 15 January)	CD: Bensar; Cat: OL 11544
1951	Lorenz Fehenberger; Walburga Wegner; Dietrich Fischer-Dieskau; Anny Schlemm; Martha Mödl	Fritz Busch; WDR Symphony Orchestra Cologne; WDR Rundfunkchor Köln choir (Recorded on 15 February)	CD: Gala; Cat: GL 100.509
1954	Jan Peerce; Herva Nelli; Robert Merrill; Virginia Haskins; Claramae Turner	Arturo Toscanini; NBC Symphony Orchestra; Robert Shaw Chorale	CD: RCA Victor; Cat: 60301
1954	Ferruccio Tagliavini; Mary Curtis-Verna; Giuseppe Valdengo; Maria Erato; Pia Tassinari	Angelo Questa; Radio Italiana Orchestra and Chorus	CD: Cetra; Cat: 661439
1956	Giuseppe di Stefano; Maria Callas; Tito Gobbi; Eugenia Ratti; Fedora Barbieri	Antonino Votto; Teatro alla Scala orchestra and chorus	CD: EMI Classics; Cat: EX 290925–5
1957	Giuseppe di Stefano; Maria Callas; Ettore Bastianini; Eugenia Ratti; Giulietta Simionato	Gianandrea Gavazzeni; Teatro alla Scala orchestra and chorus	CD: EMI Classics; Cat:
1960	Carlo Bergonzi; Birgit Nilsson; Cornell MacNeil; Sylvia Stahlman; Giulietta Simionato	Georg Solti; Accademia di Santa Cecilia orchestra and chorus	CD: Decca; Cat: 475 8278; Cat: 000829602
1966	Carlo Bergonzi; Leontyne Price; Robert Merrill; Reri Grist; Shirley Verrett	Erich Leinsdorf; RCA Italiana Opera orchestra and chorus	CD: RCA Victor; Cat: 6645-2-RG
1970	Luciano Pavarotti; Renata Tebaldi; Sherrill Milnes; Helen Donath; Regina Resnik	Bruno Bartoletti; Accademia di Santa Cecilia orchestra and chorus	LP: SET; Cat: 484–6; CD: SET; Cat: 440 042-2 DMO2; Cat: 460 762-2 DF2
1975	Plácido Domingo; Martina Arroyo; Piero Cappuccilli; Reri Grist; Fiorenza Cossotto	Riccardo Muti; Philharmonia Orchestra; Royal Opera House chorus	CD: EMI Classics; Cat: CMS 7 69576 2
1975	Plácido Domingo; Katia Ricciarelli; Piero Cappuccilli; Reri Grist; Elizabeth Bainbridge	Claudio Abbado; Royal Opera House orchestra and chorus (Recording on 8 February)	DVD: Kultur Video; Cat: D 2071; DVD: Covent Garden Pioneer; Cat: B 12373–01
1975	José Carreras; Montserrat Caballé; Renato Bruson; Margherita Guglielmi; Ruza Baldani	Francesco Molinari-Pradelli; Teatro alla Scala orchestra and chorus (Recorded on 18 February)	CD: Opera d'Oro; Cat: OPD 7048
1979	José Carreras; Montserrat Caballé; Ingvar Wixell; Sona Ghazarian; Patricia Payne	Sir Colin Davis; Royal Opera House orchestra and chorus	CD: Philips; Cat: 426 560–2
1980	Luciano Pavarotti; Katia Ricciarelli; Louis Quilico; Judith Blegen; Bianca Berini	Giuseppe Patanè; Metropolitan Opera orchestra and chorus (Production: Elijah Moshinsky; recorded 16 February)	Streaming video: Met Opera on Demand; DVD: Decca; Cat: 074 3227
1985	Luciano Pavarotti; Margaret Price; Renato Bruson; Kathleen Battle; Christa Ludwig	Sir Georg Solti; National Philharmonic Orchestra; Royal College of Music Junior Department chorus London Opera chorus	CD: Decca; Cat: 410 210-2 DH2
1985	Plácido Domingo; Katia Ricciarelli; Renato Bruson; Edita Gruberová; Elena Obraztsova	Claudio Abbado; Teatro alla Scala orchestra and chorus	CD: Deutsche Grammophon; Cat: 453 148–2
1989	Plácido Domingo; Josephine Barstow; Leo Nucci; Sumi Jo; Florence Quivar	Herbert von Karajan; Vienna Philharmonic Orchestra; Vienna State Opera chorus	CD: Deutsche Grammophon; Cat: 427 635–2
1991	Luciano Pavarotti; Aprile Millo; Leo Nucci; Harolyn Blackwell; Florence Quivar	James Levine; Metropolitan Opera orchestra and chorus (Production: Piero Faggioni; recorded 26 January)	Streaming video: Met Opera on Demand; DVD: Deutsche Grammophon; Cat: 073 029–9; Cat: 001086309
2005	Massimiliano Pisapia; Chiara Taigi; Franco Vassallo; Anna Maria Chiuri; Eunyee You	Riccardo Chailly; Gewandhausorchester (Recorded in Leipzig Opera, November)	DVD: EuroArts; Cat: 0880242551085
2012	Marcelo Álvarez; Sondra Radvanovsky; Dmitri Hvorostovsky; Kathleen Kim; Stephanie Blythe	Fabio Luisi; Metropolitan Opera orchestra and chorus (Production: David Alden; recorded 8 December)	HD video: Met Opera on Demand; Deutsche Grammophon DVD; Cat: 0880242551085
2016	Piotr Beczala; Anja Harteros; George Petean; Sofia Fomina; Okka von der Damerau	Zubin Mehta; Bayerische Staatsoper orchestra and chorus (Johannes Erath, stage director; recorded 3–9 March)	4K Ultra HD: C Major; Cat: 739507
2022	Francesco Meli, Sondra Radvanovsky, Luca Salsa, Federica Guida, Yulia Matochkina	Nicola Luisotti, La Scala Orchestra & Chorus (Staging, sets and costumes: Marco Arturo Marelli; recorded live, May 2022)	4k Ultra HD: LaScalaTv
2026	Matthew Polenzani, Anna Netrebko, Ludovic Tézier, Sara Blanch, Elizabeth DeShong	Speranza Scappucci, Paris Opera Orchestra & Chorus (Director: Gilbert Deflo; recorded live, Opéra Bastille)	Full HD: Paris Opera Play
