= Simon Boccanegra discography =

Audio and video recordings of Verdi's opera

This is a list of audio and video recordings (discography) of Simon Boccanegra, an Italian opera with music composed by Giuseppe Verdi. The first performance of the work was on 12 March 1857 at the Teatro La Fenice in Venice with a libretto by Francesco Maria Piave. Verdi subsequently revised the work in an edition reworked by the librettist Arrigo Boito, which was first performed on 24 March 1881 at La Scala in Milan. It is this latter version which is the one most frequently performed today.

== Audio recordings of the 1857 original version ==
Year	Cast (Boccanegra, Maria, Adorno, Fiesco)	Conductor, Opera House and Orchestra	Label
1975	Sesto Bruscantini, Josella Ligi, André Turp, Gwynne Howell	John Matheson, BBC Concert Orchestra and the BBC Singers (Recording of a concert performance in the Golders Green Hippodrome on 2 August; broadcast on 1 January 1976)	CD: Opera Rara; Cat: ORCV 302
1999	Vitorio Vitelli, Annalisa Raspagliosi, Warren Mok, Francesco Ellero d'Artegna	Renato Palumbo, Orchestra Internationale d'Italia (Recording made at performances at the Festival della Valle d'Itria, Martina Franca, 4, 6, 8 August)	CD: Dynamic, 268/1-2
2024	Germán Enrique Alcántara, Eri Nakamura, Iván Ayón-Rivas, William Thomas	Mark Elder, The Hallé, Chorus of Opera North, RNCM Opera Chorus (Studio recording, April 2024, Hallé St Peter's, 2022 edition by Roger Parker)	CD: Opera Rara; Cat: ORC65

== Audio recordings of the 1881 revised version ==
Year	Cast: (Boccanegra, Amelia (Maria), Gabriele Adorno, Jacobo Fiesco)	Conductor, Opera House and Orchestra	Label
1939	Lawrence Tibbett, Elisabeth Rethberg, Giovanni Martinelli, Ezio Pinza	Ettore Panizza, Metropolitan Opera Orchestra & Chorus	CD: Myto Historical; Cat: 981H006
1951	Paolo Silveri, Antonietta Stella, Carlo Bergonzi, Mario Petri	Francesco Molinari-Pradelli, Coro e Orchestra di Roma della RAI	CD: Warner Fonit; Cat: 5050467 7906-2
1957	Tito Gobbi, Victoria de los Ángeles, Giuseppe Campora, Boris Christoff	Gabriele Santini, Teatro dell'Opera di Roma orchestra and chorus	CD: EMI; Cat: CDMB 63513 (Digitally remastered, 1990)
1958	Tito Gobbi, Leyla Gencer, Mirto Picchi, Ferruccio Mazzoli	Mario Rossi, Teatro di San Carlo Orchestra and Chorus, Naples (Recorded live, Naples, 26 December)	CD: Hardy Classics; HCA 6002-2 (Also has video version)
1973	Piero Cappuccilli, Katia Ricciarelli, Plácido Domingo, Ruggero Raimondi	Gianandrea Gavazzeni, RCA Italiana Opera Chorus and Orchestra	CD: RCA Records; Cat: RD 70729
1977	Piero Cappuccilli, Mirella Freni, José Carreras, Nicolai Ghiaurov	Claudio Abbado, Coro e Orchestra del Teatro alla Scala	CD: DG; Cat: 449 752–2
1988	Leo Nucci, Kiri Te Kanawa, Giacomo Aragall, Paata Burchuladze	Georg Solti, Coro e Orchestra del Teatro alla Scala	CD: Decca; Cat: 475 7011
2015	Dmitri Hvorostovsky, Barbara Frittoli, Stefano Secco, Ildar Abdrazakov	Constantine Orbelian; Kaunas City Symphony Orchestra and Kaunas State Choir	CD: Delos; Cat: DE 3457
2024	Ludovic Tézier, Martina Rebeka, Francesco Meli, Michele Pertusi	Michele Spotti; Chorus and Orchestra of the Teatro di San Carlo, Naples	CD: Prima Classic; Cat: PRIMA069

== Video recordings of the 1881 revised version ==
Year	Cast: (Boccanegra, Amelia (Maria), Gabriele Adorno, Jacopo Fiesco)	Conductor, Opera House and Orchestra	Label
1958	Tito Gobbi, Leyla Gencer, Mirto Picchi, Ferruccio Mazzoli	Mario Rossi, Teatro di San Carlo Orchestra and Chorus, Naples (Recorded live, Naples, 26 December)	VHS Video, PAL only: Hardy Classics; Cat: HCA 60002-2 (Also has audio version)
1976	Piero Cappuccilli, Katia Ricciarelli, Giorgio Merighi, Nicolai Ghiaurov	Oliviero De Fabritiis, NHK Symphony Orchestra and Union of Japan Professional Choruses, Tokyo (Recorded live, Tokyo, October)	DVD: Premiere Opera 5173; VAI 4484
1984	Sherrill Milnes, Anna Tomowa-Sintow, Vasile Moldoveanu, Paul Plishka	James Levine, Metropolitan Opera Orchestra and Chorus (Production: Tito Capobianco; recorded live, Metropolitan Opera House, 29 December)	DVD: Pioneer Classics PIBC 2010; DG 073 4403; Streaming video: Met Opera on Demand
1995	Vladimir Chernov, Kiri Te Kanawa, Plácido Domingo, Robert Lloyd	James Levine, Metropolitan Opera Orchestra and Chorus (Production: Giancarlo del Monaco; recorded live, Metropolitan Opera House, 26 January)	DVD: DG 00440 073 0319; Streaming video: Met Opera on Demand
2007	Roberto Frontali, Carmen Giannattasio, Giuseppe Gipali, Giacomo Prestia	Michele Mariotti, Chorus and Orchestra of the Teatro Comunale, Bologna (Stage director: Giorgio Fiorato; recorded live)	DVD: ArtHaus Musik; Cat: 101 307
2010	Plácido Domingo, Adrianne Pieczonka, Marcello Giordani, James Morris	James Levine, Metropolitan Opera Orchestra and Chorus (Production: Giancarlo del Monaco; recorded live, Metropolitan Opera House, 6 February)	DVD: Sony; Cat: 780664; HD video: Met Opera on Demand
2010	Plácido Domingo, Marina Poplavskaya, Joseph Calleja, Ferruccio Furlanetto	Antonio Pappano, Royal Opera House Orchestra and Chorus (Stage director: Elijah Moshinsky; recorded live, July)	DVD: EMI Classics; Cat: 917825-9
2018	Ludovic Tézier, Maria Agresta, Francesco Demuro, Mika Kares	Fabio Luisi, Paris Opera Orchestra and Chorus (Director: Calixto Bieito; recorded live, Opéra Bastille)	HD video: Paris Opera Play
2019	Luca Salsi, Marina Rebeka, Charles Castronovo, René Pape	Valery Gergiev, Wiener Philharmoniker (Stage director: Andreas Kriegenburg; recorded live, Großes Festspielhaus, Salzburg Festival)	HD video: Unitel; Cat: 802704
2020	Christian Gerhaher, Jennifer Rowley, Otar Jorjikia, Christof Fischesser	Fabio Luisi, Philharmonia Zurich, Chorus of Zurich Opera (Stage director: Andreas Homoki; recorded live, December)	Blu-ray: Accentus Music; Cat: ACC10510
