= Ugo Savarese =

Italian baritone (1912–1997)

- Ugo Savarese in Rigoletto (photo with 1954 dedication)
- Occupation: Opera singer

Ugo Savarese (2 December 1912, Naples – 19 December 1997, Genoa) was an Italian operatic baritone, particularly associated with the Italian repertory.

Savarese began his vocal studies in 1930 at the Conservatorio San Pietro a Majella in Naples with Maestro Conte. He made his stage debut in 1934, at the Teatro San Carlo in Naples, singing small roles. He sang his first major role, Silvio, there in 1938, followed by Rigoletto and Germont.

Like most singers of his generation, his career was interrupted by military service. He resumed his career after being a prisoner in a German war camp. From then on, his career steadily progressed, with guest appearances at both the Opéra-Comique and the Palais Garnier in Paris, the Teatro Nacional Sao Carlos in Lisbon, the Liceu in Barcelona, the Teatro Real in Madrid, and also appearing in London, Monte Carlo, Zurich, Brussels, Leningrad (Saint Petersburg), etc., where he was particularly appreciated in Verdi roles.

He sang most of the baritone roles of the Italian repertory in opera such as Macbeth, Il trovatore, Un ballo in maschera, Aida, La Gioconda, Fedora, Tosca, etc.

The baritone appeared at La Scala in Aida (opposite Herva Nelli, Elena Nicolai, Mirto Picchi, and Cesare Siepi, 1948), La Gioconda (1948), Aida again (with Mario del Monaco, conducted by Victor de Sabata, 1951), Cavalleria rusticana (with Gigliola Frazzoni, conducted by Antonino Votto, 1955), and Andrea Chénier (opposite Franco Corelli, conducted by Gianandrea Gavazzeni, 1960).

Savarese did not reached the fame of some of his contemporaries such as Tito Gobbi, Paolo Silveri, Giuseppe Valdengo, and Gino Bechi, but his recordings demonstrate a well-schooled voice and sturdy performer. He sang until the early 1970s, and taught from 1974 to 1996.

== Studio Discography ==
- Puccini: La fanciulla del West (Gavazzi, Campagnano; Basile, 1950) Cetra/Bel Canto Society
- Giordano: Andrea Chénier (Tebaldi, Soler; Basile, 1953) Cetra
- Verdi: La traviata (Callas, F.Albanese; Santini, 1953) Cetra
- Verdi: Il trovatore (Tebaldi, Simionato, del Monaco, Tozzi; Erede, 1956) Decca

== Sources ==
- Operissimo.com
