= Mirto Picchi =

Italian tenor

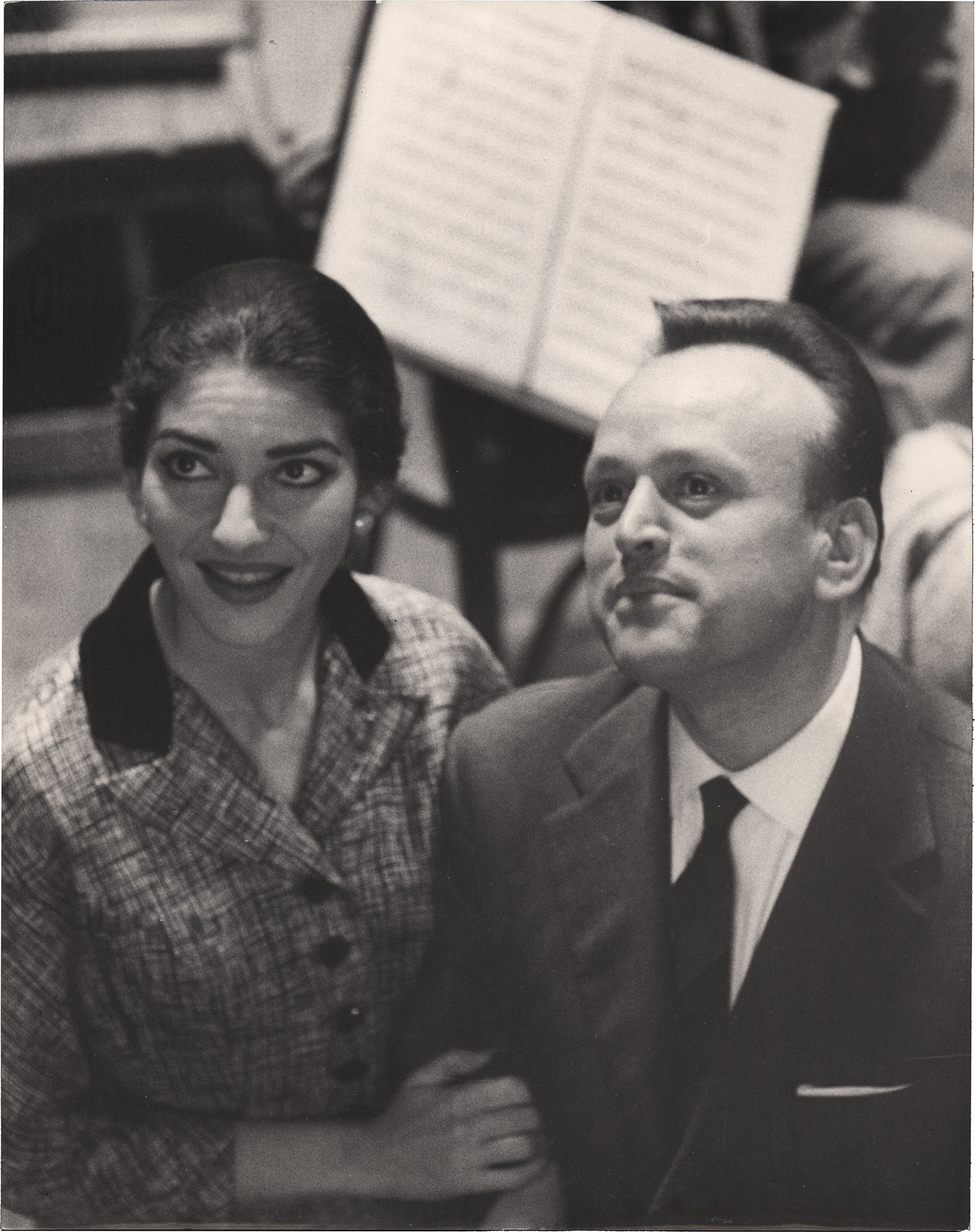
Mirto Picchi with Maria Callas in 1957. Foto Cisventi

Mirto Picchi (15 March 1915, San Mauro, near Florence - 25 September 1980, Florence) was an Italian dramatic tenor, particularly associated with the Italian repertory, and with contemporary works.

Picchi studied in Milan with Giulia Tess and Giuseppe Armani, and made his debut there as Radamès in Aïda, in 1946. Later, the tenor sang Radamès again at the Teatro alla Scala (opposite Maria Caniglia, then Herva Nelli, 1948), Andrea Chénier (with Renata Tebaldi and Enzo Mascherini, 1948), Fidelio (with Delia Rigal, 1949), Boris Godounov (as the Pretender, with Boris Christoff, 1949), Raskolnikov (1950), Lucrezia Borgia (opposite Caterina Mancini and Miriam Pirazzini, 1951), The Rake's Progress (with Dame Elisabeth Schwarzkopf, 1951), Proserpina y el Extranjero (1952), Wozzeck (as the Drum Major, with Tito Gobbi and Dorothy Dow, conducted by Dimitri Mitropoulos, 1952), Cagliostro (1953), Der Freischütz (with Victoria de los Ángeles, conducted by Carlo Maria Giulini, 1955), La figlia di Iorio (conducted by Gianandrea Gavazzeni, 1956), Malipiero's I capricci di Callot (led by Nino Sanzogno, 1968), The Bassarids (1968), Wozzeck (now as the Captain to Ticho Parly's Drum Major, conducted by Claudio Abbado, 1971), Morte dell'aria (at the Piccola Scala, 1971), and Le nozze di Figaro (with José van Dam and Mirella Freni as the Contessa, 1974).

Mirto Picchi as Pollione in Norma, Teatro comunale, Florence, 1948 (photo with dedication)

In 1946/47 he appeared in Vienna as Radamès in Aïda and as Don José in Carmen, and 1947 in London, at the Cambridge Theatre, as the Duca di Mantua in Rigoletto, Rodolfo in La bohème, Cavaradossi in Tosca. He sang Pollione in Norma, opposite Maria Callas, at Florence in 1948, Riccardo in Un ballo in maschera at Edinburgh in 1949 and Radamès in Naples in 1950. He made his debut at the Royal Opera House in 1952, as Pollione in Norma, again opposite Maria Callas. He also appeared in Rio de Janeiro in 1950 and in Chicago as Pollione in 1954.

However, the main part of his career was in Italy, notably in Milan, Rome, Naples and Florence.

He created roles in many contemporary works, notably Ildebrando Pizzetti's Cagliostro and La figlia di Iorio, and Juan José Castro's Proserpina y el Extranjero. In 1957, the tenor participated in a film of Il tabarro for Italian television.

One of the leading tenors of the post-war period, he had a fine voice and was an accomplished singing-actor. He retired from the stage in 1974 (Don Basilio in Le nozze di Figaro, at La Scala), and published his autobiography, Un trono vicino al sol, in 1978.

== Studio Discography ==
- Verdi: Don Carlo (Caniglia, Stignani, Silveri, Rossi-Lemeni; Previtali, 1951) Cetra
- Cherubini: Médée (Callas, Scotto, Pirazzini, Modesti; Serafin, 1957) Ricordi/EMI

== Sources ==
- Le guide de l'opéra, les indispensables de la musique, R. Mancini & J-J. Rouvereux, Fayard, 1986, ISBN 2-213-01563-5
