= Fernando Corena =

Swiss bass

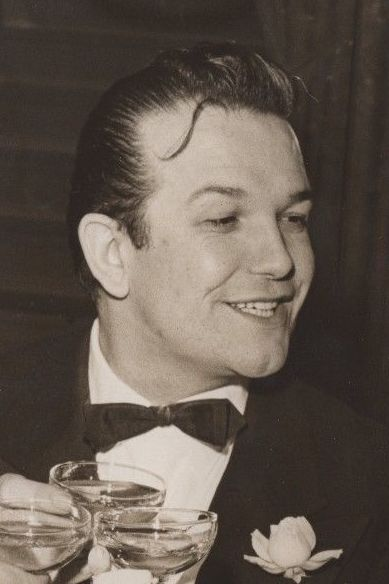
Corena in 1953

Fernando Corena (22 December 1916 – 26 November 1984) was a Swiss bass who had a major international opera career from the late 1940s through the early 1980s. He enjoyed a long and successful career at the Metropolitan Opera between 1954 and 1978, and was a regular presence at the Vienna State Opera between 1963 and 1981. His repertoire encompassed both dramatic and comic roles in leading and secondary parts, mainly within Italian opera. He was highly regarded for his performances of opera buffa characters and is generally considered one of the greatest basso buffos of the post-war era. He was heralded as the true successor to comic Italian bass Salvatore Baccaloni, and in 1966 Harold C. Schonberg wrote in The New York Times that he was "the outstanding buffo in action today and the greatest scene stealer in the history of opera".

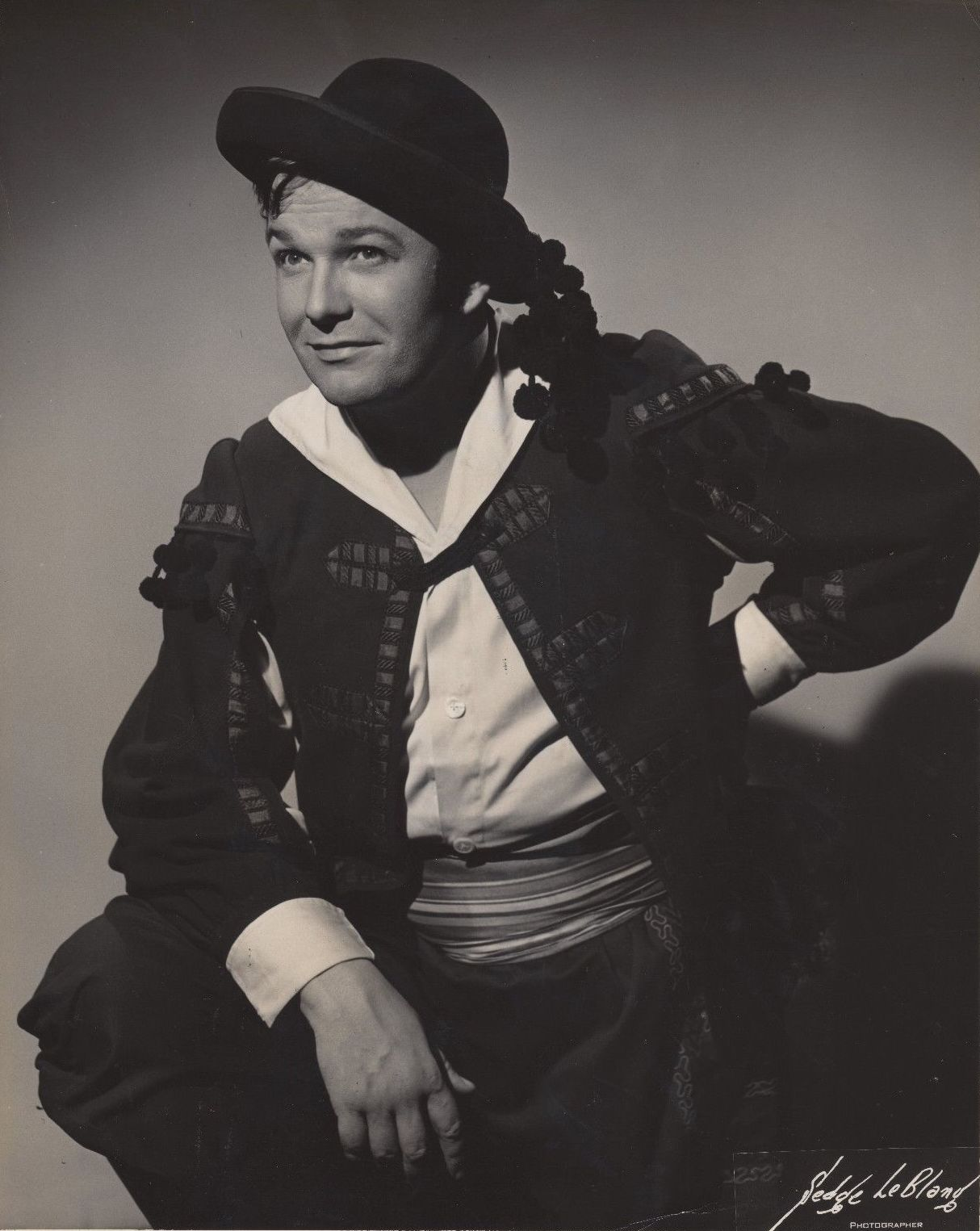
Corena as Leporello (1954)

== Life and career ==
Fernando Corena in Don Pasquale, Teatro alla Scala, Milan, 1951-1952.

Fernando Corena was born in Geneva, Switzerland, to a Greek Ottoman father (the name was Korena) and an Italian mother. He studied theology at the Fribourg University, hoping to become a priest. After winning a vocal contest, he turned his attention to music. He first studied in his native Geneva, 1937–38. He was then noticed by Italian conductor Vittorio Gui, who encouraged him to complete his vocal studies in Milan, with Enrico Romani.

At the beginning of World War II, he returned to Switzerland, where he performed regularly on radio broadcasts, and made a few appearances at the Zurich Opera House.

His official professional debut was in Trieste, as Varlaam in Boris Godunov, in 1947. He then appeared throughout Italy, singing the standard repertory, Sparafucile, Escamillo, Scarpia, etc. He made his first appearances at La Scala and the Maggio Musicale Fiorentino in 1948. In 1949, he took part in the creation of Goffredo Petrassi's Il cordovano at La Scala in Milan. Although he did not fully surrender the serious bass roles, he steadily moved into the buffo roles and found his career moving more swiftly upward. From 1950 to 1952, he sang annually at the Arena di Verona opera festival. In 1953 he made his first appearance at the Edinburgh Festival in the title role of Giuseppe Verdi's Falstaff.

Corena's Metropolitan Opera debut took place as Leporello in Don Giovanni on February 6, 1954, with Cesare Siepi in the title role, Margaret Harshaw as Donna Anna, Cesare Valletti as Don Ottavio, Lucine Amara as Donna Elvira, Roberta Peters as Zerlina, and Max Rudolf conducting. He established himself almost immediately as a favorite singer in that house. For a quarter of a century, he all but owned the great comic and character roles such as the two Bartolos, in Mozart's Le nozze di Figaro and Rossini's Il barbiere di Siviglia, Benoit in La bohème, Don Alfonso in Così fan tutte, Dulcamara in L'elisir d'amore, Falstaff, Mathieu in Andrea Chénier, Melitone in La forza del destino, Mustafa in L'italiana in Algeri, the Sacristan in Tosca, Sulpice in La fille du régiment, the title role in Gianni Schicchi and Varlaam in Boris Godunov. He also sang a small number of serious leading roles like Lescaut in Manon. His final and 723rd performance at the Met was in the title role of Don Pasquale on 30 December 1978 with Beverly Sills as Norina, Alfredo Kraus as Ernesto, and conductor Nicola Rescigno.

Aside from his close relationship to New York, Corena enjoyed considerable success with opera companies both in the United States and Europe. In 1955 he sang Falstaff at the Glyndebourne Festival. In 1956 he made his debut with the Philadelphia Grand Opera Company singing Archibaldo in Italo Montemezzi's L'amore dei tre re with Beverly Sills as Fiora, Ramón Vinay as Avito, and Frank Guarrera as Manfredo. In 1957 he sang in the world premiere of two operas by Gian Francesco Malipiero at the Teatro della Pergola, Il figliuol prodigo and Venere prigioniera. In 1959 he sang Falstaff with the Israeli Opera in Tel Aviv. In 1960 he made his first appearance at the Lyric Opera of Chicago singing Benoit/Alcindoro in La bohème and later that season Bartolo in Le nozze di Figaro. That same year he made his debut at the Royal Opera, Covent Garden as Rossini's Bartolo. In 1961 he made his debut with the Philadelphia Lyric Opera Company as Rossini's Bartolo, returning there to sing Geronte di Ravoir in Puccini's Manon Lescaut (1961), and Sulpice (1967, 1973). In 1962 he made his first appearance at La Monnaie and in 1965 he made his debut with the Deutsche Oper Berlin. In 1963 he joined the roster at the Vienna State Opera where he sang regularly through 1981. He sang frequently at the Salzburg Festival between 1965 and 1971, portraying such roles as Don Pasquale, and Osmin in Die Entführung aus dem Serail, among others. He also appeared at the Bavarian State Opera, De Nederlandse Opera, the Opéra National de Paris, the Palacio de Bellas Artes, the Teatro Colón, and the San Francisco Opera.

Corena possessed a big, handsome, resonant voice that lacked sufficient flexibility to deliver accurately the complexities of Rossini's florid writing. However, his complete involvement in his characters, and sheer physical presence and acting abilities, more than made up for any vocal technical shortcomings. Opera magazine, for instance, noted in a performance in 1954 of Barber of Seville, that as Bartolo, he was "the very picture of self-satisfied middle age. The characterization was an absolutely complete one... Nothing he did was without point, nothing he did failed to contribute to the total character". Thus this was a performance of Barber which was "dominated by the Bartolo".

Corena left many recordings of his best roles, notably two recordings of Mozart's Bartolo in Le nozze di Figaro, under Erich Kleiber and Erich Leinsdorf, Leporello in Don Giovanni, under Josef Krips and later under Erich Leinsdorf, Mustafa in L'italiana in Algeri, three recordings of Rossini's Bartolo in Il barbiere di Siviglia under Alberto Erede, Erich Leinsdorf, and Silvio Varviso, Dulcamara in L'elisir d'amore, Don Pasquale, Fra Melitone in La forza del destino, with Renata Tebaldi and Mario del Monaco, and a second with Adriana Guerrini, Gianni Schicchi, Benoit/Alcindoro in La bohème at least three times, etc. He also recorded the role of Rodolfo in La sonnambula, opposite Joan Sutherland in 1962. More serious roles he recorded include the King of Egypt in two recordings of Aida with Renata Tebaldi, Mathieu in Andrea Chénier, also with Tebaldi, two recordings of the Bonze in Madama Butterfly with both Anna Moffo and Renata Tebaldi, and the Gessler in Rossini's Guglielmo Tell (William Tell) with Giuseppe Taddei and Rosanna Carteri.

Fernando Corena died in Lugano, Switzerland, on 26 November 1984, four weeks short of his 68th birthday.

== See also ==
- Le nozze di Figaro (Kleiber recording)

== Sources ==
- Alain Pâris, Dictionnaire des interprètes et de l'interpretation musicale au XX siècle (2 vols), Éditions Robert Laffont (Bouquins, Paris 1982, 4th Edn. 1995, 5th Edn 2004). ISBN 2-221-06660-X
- Roland Mancini and Jean-Jacques Rouveroux, (orig. H. Rosenthal and J. Warrack, French edition), Guide de l'opéra, Les indispensables de la musique (Fayard, 1995). ISBN 2-213-59567-4
- Metropolitan Opera Encyclopedia, edited by David Anderson ISBN 0-671-61732-X
- Carlo Piccardi (2005). "Fernando Corena". In Andreas Kotte (ed.). Theaterlexikon der Schweiz / Dictionnaire du théâtre en Suisse / Dizionario Teatrale Svizzero / Lexicon da teater svizzer [Theater Dictionary of Switzerland] (in Italian). Vol. 1. Zürich: Chronos. pp. 407–408. ISBN 978-3-0340-0715-3. LCCN 2007423414. OCLC 62309181.
