= Fiorenza Cossotto =

Italian mezzo-soprano

Fiorenza Cossotto (born 22 April 1935) is an Italian operatic mezzo-soprano.

Fiorenza Cossotto

== Life and career ==
Born on 22 April 1935, in Crescentino, Province of Vercelli, Italy, Cossotto attended the Turin Academy of Music and studied with Mercedes Llopart. She made her operatic debut as Sister Matilde in the world premiere of Poulenc's Dialogues of the Carmelites in 1957 at La Scala in Milan. Her international debut was at the 1958 Wexford Festival as Giovanna Seymour in Donizetti's Anna Bolena. Her Covent Garden debut was in 1959 as Neris in Cherubini's Médée, with Maria Callas in the title role. A 1962 performance of the lead in La favorita at La Scala led to wider fame and she made her American debut in the same role in 1964 at the Lyric Opera of Chicago and as Amneris at the Metropolitan Opera in 1968.

Between the seasons of 1967–68 and 1988–89, Cossotto gave 148 performances at the Met (exclusively leading roles). She was considered an expert in portrayals of major mezzo/contralto roles in mid-19th-century Italian opera such as Leonora (La favorita), Amneris (Aida), Azucena (Il trovatore), Eboli (Don Carlos), Preziosilla (La forza del destino), Maddalena (Maddalena), Ulrica (Un ballo in maschera) and Laura (La Gioconda). She also portrayed Carmen, Mozart's Cherubino, Urbain in Meyerbeer's Les Huguenots, Bellini's Romeo and Marfa in Khovanshchina.

In 2005, Cossotto celebrated her 70th birthday with a performance of Suor Angelica at the Théâtre Royal in Liège, Belgium.

Cossotto was married to the Italian bass Ivo Vinco for over 40 years (ending in divorce). They had a son.

According to the book Opera, "She [Cossotto] and Giulietta Simionato were the leading Italian mezzo-sopranos of the 1960s and 1970s. She [Cossotto] won plaudits in the annals of operatic history for her wonderful vocal timbre, her perfect singing technique, and the ease with which she could master different registers. Besides singing the great mezzo roles, she also took the outstanding alto parts of the Italian operatic repertoire."

Apart from mezzo and alto roles, Cossotto also sang soprano roles traditionally sung by mezzos such as Santuzza (Cavalleria Rusticana) and Adalgisa (Norma).

She sang Adalgisa to the Normas of Callas, Joan Sutherland, Montserrat Caballé, Leyla Gencer, and Elinor Ross

Her repertory at the Met included Amneris, Eboli, Adalgisa, Santuzza, Azucena, Dalila, Carmen (only on tour and in outdoor park concerts), Principessa di Bouillon (Adriana Lecouvreur) and Mistress Quickly (which she added in 1985, singing with Giuseppe Taddei as Falstaff).

== Studio discography ==
Year	Work Role	Conductor Cast members	Label
1957	La sonnambula, Teresa	Antonino Votto; Maria Callas; Nicola Monti	EMI Classics
1957	Andrea Chénier, Bersi	Gianandrea Gavazzeni; Renata Tebaldi |Mario del Monaco	Decca
1958	Madama Butterfly, Suzuki	Tullio Serafin; Renata Tebaldi; Carlo Bergonzi	Decca Records
1959	La Gioconda, Laura	Antonino Votto; Maria Callas; Piero Cappuccilli	EMI Classics
1959	The Marriage of Figaro, Cherubino	Carlo Maria Giulini; Giuseppe Taddei; Elisabeth Schwarzkopf	EMI Classics
1959	Requiem (Verdi), Mezzo-Soprano	Tullio Serafin; Boris Christoff; Eugenio Fernandi	Testament Records
1961	Don Carlos, Eboli	Gabriele Santini; Boris Christoff; Antonietta Stella	Deutsche Grammophon
1963	Il trovatore, Azucena	Tullio Serafin; Carlo Bergonzi; Antonietta Stella	Deutsche Grammophon
1964	Rigoletto, Maddalena	Rafael Kubelík; Renata Scotto; Dietrich Fischer-Dieskau	Deutsche Grammophon
1965	Cavalleria rusticana, Santuzza	Herbert von Karajan; Carlo Bergonzi; Giangiacomo Guelfi	Deutsche Grammophon
1967	Medea, Neris	Lamberto Gardelli; Gwyneth Jones; Bruno Prevedi	Decca Records
1967	Requiem (Verdi), Mezzo-Soprano	Herbert von Karajan; Leontyne Price; Luciano Pavarotti	Deutsche Grammophon (audio and video)
1968	Cavalleria rusticana, Santuzza	Herbert von Karajan; Gianfranco Cecchele />Giangiacomo Guelfi	Deutsche Grammophon (Film)
1968	Norma, Adalgisa	Silvio Varviso; Elena Suliotis; Mario del Monaco	Decca Records
1970	Requiem (Verdi), Mezzo-Soprano	Sir John Barbirolli; Montserrat Caballé; Jon Vickers	EMI Classics
1970	Il trovatore, Azucena	Zubin Mehta; Leontyne Price; Plácido Domingo	RCA Records
1972	Norma, Adalgisa	Carlo Felice Cillario; Montserrat Caballé; Plácido Domingo	RCA Records
1973	Suor Angelica, La zia Principessa	Bruno Bartoletti; Katia Ricciarelli; Maria Grazia Allegri	RCA Records
1974	Un giorno di regno, Marchesa del Poggio	Lamberto Gardelli; Jessye Norman; José Carreras	Philips Records
1974	Aida, Amneris	Riccardo Muti; Montserrat Caballé; Plácido Domingo	EMI Classics
1974	La favorite, Leonora	Richard Bonynge; Luciano Pavarotti; Gabriel Bacquier	Decca Records
1975	Un ballo in maschera, Ulrica	Riccardo Muti; Martina Arroyo; Plácido Domingo	EMI Classics
1976	Macbeth, Lady Macbeth	Riccardo Muti; Sherrill Milnes; José Carreras	EMI Classics
1976	La forza del destino, Preziosilla	James Levine; Leontyne Price; Plácido Domingo	RCA Records
1978	Tancredi, Tancredi	Gabriele Ferro; Lella Cuberli; Nicola Ghiuselev	Warner Fonit
1978	Arie di Verdi, Abigaille (Nabucco); Elvira (Ernani); Medora (Il Corsaro); Eboli (Don Carlo); Amelia (Un ballo in maschera)	Nello Santi; Ivo Vinco	Warner Fonit
