= Caterina Mancini =

Italian opera singer

Caterina Mancini,1951

Caterina Mancini (10 November 1924 – 21 January 2011) was an Italian dramatic coloratura soprano, primarily active in Italy in the 1950s.

Mancini was born at Genzano di Roma. She made her debut in 1948, as Giselda in I Lombardi, in Florence. In 1950, she appeared in Bologna and Venice, in Norma, and made her debut at La Scala in Milan, in Lucrezia Borgia, in 1951.

The same year, she sang in many Verdi operas on radio broadcast (RAI) to commemorate 50th anniversary of Verdi's death. Many of these broadcasts have been released by the record company Cetra, notably, Nabucco, Ernani, Attila, La battaglia di Legnano, Il trovatore, and Aïda.

She sang mostly in Italy, notably as Anaide in Mosè in Egitto in Florence (1955), and as Amelia in Il duca d'Alba, in Verona (1956). She made occasional appearances in France and Spain. Other notable roles included: Amelia, Elisabetta, Gioconda, Santuzza, Tosca.

Mancini was a dramatic coloratura soprano, possessing a large and powerful, yet surprisingly flexible voice, which made her an excellent exponent of early Verdi operas. Health problems in the early 1960s led her to withdraw little by little from the stage. In fact, on 30 November 1963 she sang the contralto part in a performance of the oratorio Messiah, for the Dallas Opera. The event was dedicated to the memory of John F. Kennedy, who had been slain in that city a few days earlier. The other soloists included Jon Vickers and Norman Treigle, and it was conducted by Nicola Rescigno. It was billed as her "first appearance as a contralto and in an English work."

Her career was in many ways similar to that of Anita Cerquetti; both had short but brilliant careers, and both were more or less eclipsed by Maria Callas, and nowadays almost forgotten.

== Selected recordings ==
- Rossini - Mosė - Nicola Rossi-Lemeni, Giuseppe Taddei, Mario Filippeschi, Caterina Mancini, Bruna Rizzoli - Coro e Orchestra del Teatro di San Carlo, Tullio Serafin
- Donizetti - Il duca d'Alba - Giangiacomo Guelfi, Caterina Mancini, Amedeo Berdini, Dario Caselli - Coro e Orchestra della RAI di Roma, Fernando Previtali
- Verdi - Nabucco - Paolo Silveri, Antonio Cassinelli, Caterina Mancini, Gabriella Gatti, Mario Binci - Coro e Orchestra della RAI di Roma, Fernando Previtali
- Verdi - Ernani - Gino Penno, Caterina Mancini, Giuseppe Taddei, Giacomo Vaghi - Coro e Orchestra della RAI di Roma, Fernando Previtali
- Verdi - Attila - Italo Tajo, Giangiacomo Guelfi, Caterina Mancini, Gino Penno - Coro e Orchestra della RAI di Milano, Carlo Maria Giulini
- Verdi - La battaglia di Legnano - Caterina Mancini, Amedeo Berdini, Rolando Panerai, Albino Gaggi - Coro e Orchestra della RAI di Roma, Fernando Previtali
- Verdi - Il trovatore - Giacomo Lauri-Volpi, Caterina Mancini, Miriam Pirazzini, Carlo Tagliabue, Alfredo Colella - Coro e Orchestra della RAI di Torino, Fernando Previtali
- Verdi - Aïda - Caterina Mancini, Mario Filippeschi, Giulietta Simionato, Rolando Panerai, Giulio Neri - Coro e Orchestra della RAI di Roma, Vittorio Gui

== Sources ==
- Le guide de l'opéra, les indispensables de la musique, R. Mancini & J-J. Rouvereux, (Fayard, 1995) ISBN 2-213-59567-4
