= Alberto Erede =

Italian conductor (1909-2001)

- Born: 8 November 1909; Genoa, Italy
- Died: 12 April 2001 (aged 91); Monte Carlo, Monaco
- Education: Verdi Conservatory
- Occupation: Conductor
- Years active: 1935 - 1985

Alberto Erede (8 November 1909 – 12 April 2001) was an Italian conductor, particularly associated with operatic work.

== Biography ==
Born in Genoa, Erede studied there before studying at the Verdi Conservatory in Milan, then with Felix Weingartner at Basel, and after this with Fritz Busch at Dresden. He made his debut in Turin in 1935, conducting Der Ring des Nibelungen. He also conducted at the Salzburg Festival. Fritz Busch invited him to Glyndebourne in England in 1934, where he conducted several performances before the war. In 1937 at the Schlosstheater Schönbrunn, he led a private performance of Mozart's Cosi fan tutte where among the audience were Sigmund Freud, Stefan Zweig, Franz Werfel, Weingartner and Oskar Kokoschka.

He toured the United States in 1937 and 1938 with the Salzburg International Opera Guild, conducting Cosi fan tutte, L'incoronazione di Poppea and La Cambiale di Matrimonio. While in America he also made his New York concert debut with the NBC Symphony Orchestra and conducted the premiere of Menotti's The Old Maid and the Thief in 1939.

He spent the war years in Italy conducting both orchestral concerts and opera. Afterwards he took up post as chief conductor of the Turin Radio orchestra, and resumed his connections in England to become music director of the New London Opera Company from 1946 to 1948. From 1950 to 1955 he conducted at the Metropolitan Opera House, New York City, debuting with La traviata (with Dorothy Kirsten). He returned to the Met in 1974 and 1975, his last performance there being Tosca (with Galina Vishnevskaya).

From 1956 he was at the Deutsche Oper am Rhein in Dusseldorf and was the musical director there from 1958 to 1962. At Covent Garden he conducted Il trovatore in 1953 (with Callas), Aida in 1960, and La traviata in 1962 (with Sutherland).

He conducted Wagner's Lohengrin at Bayreuth in 1968, being the first Italian to appear there since Arturo Toscanini. He returned to the Metropolitan Opera for the 1974–75 season. On 3 January 1977 he conducted a performance of Puccini's Tosca at the Vienna State Opera. The cast included Leonie Rysanek in the title role, with Placido Domingo as Cavaradossi and Theo Adam as Scarpia. In 1985 he made guest appearances in Sydney with the Australian Opera; a video recording of Puccini's Tosca, with Erede conducting, was made at the Sydney Opera House during that year.

He died in Monte Carlo in 2001.

== Recordings ==
Erede conducted the recordings of extracts from Falstaff by Mariano Stabile and a La Scala cast during the war. He conducted the earlier series of Italian opera on long-playing Decca Records featuring Renata Tebaldi and the Accademia di Santa Cecilia (Rome) Orchestra and Chorus, during the 1950s. Some are listed below:

- Puccini: La bohème – with Giacinto Prandelli, Hilde Gueden, Giovanni Inghilleri, Raphael Arié, Fernando Corena. (Decca LP LXT 2622-3). (Before 1953. EMG review April 1958).
- Puccini: Tosca – with Giuseppe Campora, Enzo Mascherini, Dario Caselli, Fernando Corena, Antonio Sacchetti. (Decca LP LXT 2730-1). (Before 1953. EMG review Nov 1952).
- Puccini: Madama Butterfly – with Nell Rankin, Renata Tebaldi, Giuseppe Campora, Giovanni Inghilleri, Piero de Palma. (Decca LP LXT 2638-40). (1951).
- Puccini: Turandot – with Inge Borkh (Tebaldi sang the role of Liu), Mario del Monaco, Fanelli, Renato Ercolani, Fernando Corena, etc. (Decca LP LXT 5128-30). (EMG review May 1955).
- Verdi: Aida – with Ebe Stignani, Mario del Monaco, Fernando Corena, Aldo Protti, Renata Tebaldi. (Decca LP LXT 2735-7 or Decca ACL 172,173,174). (Before 1953).
- Verdi: Otello – with Mario del Monaco, Aldo Protti, Piero de Palma, Luisa Ribacchi (Decca LP LXT 5009-11). (EMG review Dec 1954).
- Verdi: Rigoletto- with Hilde Gueden, Mario del Monaco, Aldo Protti, Guiletta Simionato (Decca LP DAX 195007-9).
- Verdi: La Traviata- with Renata Tebaldi, Gianni Poggi, Aldo Protti (Decca LP DAX195004-6)
- Donizetti: La favorita – Giulietta Simionato, Jerome Hines, Gianni Poggi, Ettore Bastianini, with Maggio Musicale Fiorentino (Decca LP LXT 5146-8). (1955).
- Rossini: Il barbiere di Siviglia – Giulietta Simionato, Cesare Siepi, Fernando Corena, Cavallari, Misciano (Decca LP LXT 5283-5). (1956).
- Mascagni: Cavalleria Rusticana – Renata Tebaldi, Jussi Bjoerling, Ettore Bastianini, Orchestra and Chorus of the Maggio Musicale Fiorentino (RCA LM-6059 (2)).
- Erede's Bayreuth 1968 Lohengrin is available on Melodram CD.
