= Eduard Tumagian =

Eduard Tumagian (05.02.1942-11.02.2024) was a Romanian Baritone opera and concert singer.

Tumagian was born in Bucharest and studied at the Conservatory of Music "Porumbescu". He made his operatic debut in Bucharest. After winning several singing competitions, he joined the Opéra of the Rhine in Strasbourg where he sang leading baritone roles including Posa in Don Carlos, Germont in La traviata, Scarpia in Tosca, and the title role in Rigoletto. Tumagian made his début at La Scala in the title role of Nabucco in 1986 and went on to sing there in the premiere Flavio Testi's opera Richard III (1987), in I due Foscari (1988), and I vespri siciliani (1989). He has also appeared at the Paris Opera, and in the opera houses of Lyon, Toulouse, Montpellier, Hamburg, Frankfurt, Munich, Vienna, Zurich, and Amsterdam and has worked with conductors including Riccardo Muti, Claudio Abbado, Alain Lombard, Nayden Todorov, Nello Santi and Mstislav Rostropovich.
