= Fausto Cleva =

American conductor

Fausto Cleva (photo with 1959 dedication)

Fausto Cleva (May 17, 1902 – August 6, 1971) was an Italian-born American operatic conductor.

== Life and career ==
Fausto Cleva was born in Trieste in 1902. After studies at the Conservatorio in his native city and Milan, Cleva made his debut conducting La traviata in Teatro Carcano, in Milan, before emigrating to the United States in 1920, becoming an American citizen in 1931. He joined the musical staff of the Metropolitan Opera later that year and for twenty years was an assistant conductor and later chorus-master and répétiteur before making his official conducting debut in February 1942. He later became closely involved with Cincinnati Summer Opera, of which he was musical director from 1934 until 1963. From 1944 to 1946 he was music director of the ill-fated Chicago Opera Company. In 1947 he conducted a performance of La bohème in Havana, with Hjördis Schymberg as Mimi. Following his return to the Metropolitan Opera in 1950, he conducted over 700 performances of thirty operas, mainly from the French and Italian repertory.

Cleva's work was marked by great attentiveness to his singers. He conducted Rigoletto with the Royal Swedish Opera at the Edinburgh Festival in 1959. He left some very important recordings, such as Leoncavallo's Pagliacci with Richard Tucker and Giuseppe Valdengo; Catalani's La Wally with Renata Tebaldi and Mario Del Monaco; Puccini's Tosca with Maria Callas, Franco Corelli and Tito Gobbi; and Verdi's Luisa Miller with Anna Moffo and Carlo Bergonzi. He recorded for a variety of labels, mainly as an accompanist for singers.

In 1971, Cleva died at age 69 from a heart attack in Athens while conducting Gluck's Orfeo ed Euridice.

== Sources ==
- "Died. Fausto Cleva". Time. August 16, 1971.
