= Gino Penno =

Italian opera singer

Penno in Ernani at Teatro Verdi

Gino Penno (8 December 1920 – 8 February 1998) was an Italian tenor, who enjoyed a short but brilliant career in opera in the 1950s.

Penno was born in Felizzano, Italy, and studied with Ettore Campogalliani. After winning a singing competition, he entered the Scuola di Canto of the Teatro alla Scala in Milan. While still a student, he sang a number of comprimario roles, and appeared in his first leading role in 1950, Floreski in Cherubini's Lodoiska.

In the early 1950s, he became known throughout Italy, as a highly competent heldentenor, singing Siegfried at the Verona Arena and Lohengrin in Rome. He also partnered the new diva Maria Callas in Norma, Macbeth, Il trovatore and Medea, in various theatres in Italy.

In 1951, his career took an international turn. He appeared at the Paris Opéra, the Liceo in Barcelona, the Monte Carlo Opera, the Metropolitan Opera in New York, and the Royal Opera House in London.

By the end of the 1950s he was gone from the international opera scene. The reason of his retirement is unknown, different sources adduce health problems, a loss of voice, or a wish for a career as a lawyer.

Penno died in Milan on 8 February 1998, aged 77.

He can be heard on a few radio broadcasts from RAI, notably Ernani (1951) and Attila (1951), opposite Caterina Mancini, and Macbeth (1952) and Medea (1953), both with Callas.

Penno lost his voice during a Trovatore at the Met in 1956. He was barely able to continue the performance. Though he appeared once more that season as a last minute replacement for Kurt Baum after the latter cancelled a Forza del destino following act two, it was the end of his American career and it would seem the end of his career on the major opera house circuit.

He seems to have continued in smaller opera houses in Italy for a few more seasons.

An important document of him at his best is an Italian language performance of Wagner's Lohengrin from Naples, broadcast on 20 November 1954. The cast includes Renata Tebaldi and is conducted by Gabriele Santini. It is currently on CD on the Hardy label. He was very highly thought of both for his musicianship and his reportedly enormous voice, of magnificent quality.

== Sources ==
- Grandi Tenori, Joern H. Anthonisen, October 2004.
