= Giacinto Prandelli =

Italian opera singer

Giacinto Prandelli

Giacinto Prandelli (8 February 1914 – 14 June 2010) was an Italian operatic tenor, particularly associated with the Italian and French repertoires.

== Life and career ==
Giacinto Prandelli as The Knight of Grieux in Manon, Teatro alla Scala, Milan (photo with 1948 dedication)

Born in Lumezzane, Italy, Prandelli sang as a boy in a church choir. He studied in Rome with Fornarini, and in Brescia with Grandini, and made his stage debut at the Teatro Donizetti in Bergamo, as Rodolfo, in 1942.

He made his debut at the Rome Opera in 1943, as Alfredo, he then appeared in Bologna, Genoa, Florence, Cagliari, Palermo, Catania, and made his debut in Milan, at the Teatro Lirico, as Rinuccio, in 1944. He sang the solo tenor part in Beethoven's Ninth Symphony, under Arturo Toscanini in 1946.

In the early 1950s, he began an international career, appearing in Monte Carlo, Barcelona, Lisbon, Buenos Aires. He made his Metropolitan Opera debut in 1951, his San Francisco Opera debut in 1954, and his Lyric Opera of Chicago in 1956.

He excelled in Italian and French lyric roles, such as; Edgardo, Duca di Mantua, Alfredo, Enzo, Rodolfo, Pinkerton, Cavaradossi, des Grieux, Werther, Gounod's and Boito's Faust, etc. He also sang in many contemporary works by Alfano, Wolf-Ferrari, Menotti, Respighi.

Prandelli's final stage appearance was in 1976 as Paolo in Francesca da Rimini at the Teatro Grande in Brescia. He can be heard in a number of recordings, notably; La bohème, Fedora, Adriana Lecouvreur, Francesca da Rimini. He appeared in a television (RAI) production of Manon Lescaut, opposite Clara Petrella in 1956.

The Italian music company Azzali Editori, Via Massimo D'Azeglio 76/A, 43100 Parma has published in 2003 a comprehensive, 303-pages life of Prandelli: "GIACINTO PRANDELLI, Del Recitar Cantando...", by Cornelia Pelletta. The text is in Italian, with 40 pages of photographs, and an inserted digital remastered CD, Giacinto Prandelli singing 18 arias from L'Elisir d'Amore, Rigoletto, Luisa Miller, Lohengrin, Werther, Manon, La Gioconda, La Bohème, Adriana Lecouvreur, Fedora, Francesca da Rimini, Manon Lescaut, and Tosca." The book was launched at Milan's La Scala in the presence of Prandelli himself six years before his death in 2010.
