= Antonino Votto =

Italian operatic conductor and vocal coach (1896–1985)

- Antonino Votto (photo with 1949 dedication)
- Born: 30 October 1896
- Died: 9 September 1985 (aged 88)
- Occupation: Conductor

Antonino Votto, (30 October 1896 – 9 September 1985) was an Italian operatic conductor and vocal coach. Votto developed an extensive discography with the Teatro alla Scala in Milan during the 1950s, when EMI produced the bulk of its studio recordings featuring Maria Callas. Though Votto was a dependable conductor (and the teacher of Riccardo Muti), critics frequently faulted his recordings for their lack of emotional immediacy. This may have been an occupational hazard of working in the studio, as his live sets with Callas, including a Norma (December 1955, La Scala) and La sonnambula (1957, Cologne) are considered to be great performances. Among his pupils was the soprano Claudia Pinza Bozzolla.

== Biography ==
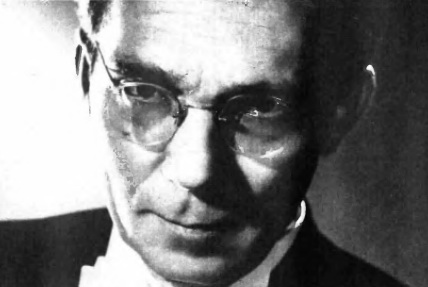
Antonino Votto in Radiocorriere magazine, 1974

He graduated in piano from the Music conservatories of Naples under the guidance of Alessandro Longo. He began to tread the boards as a virtuoso pianist before establishing himself, as early as the 1920s in conducting. Arturo Toscanini right-hand man, he entered La Scala in Milan as early as 1923, later conducting operas in major theaters, from Teatro Colón in Buenos Aires to Teatro Massimo in Palermo, from Tokyo to London, from Berlin to Amsterdam. Seven times he opened La Scala's opera season.

From 1941 he acquired the chair of orchestral conducting at the Giuseppe Verdi Milan Conservatory, where over the course of thirty years of teaching he was the teacher of other important performers of contemporary music, such as Riccardo Muti, Claudio Abbado, Maurizio Pollini, Guido Cantelli, and Giorgio Gaslini.

He had to stop conducting in 1973-Carlo Bergonzi (tenor) remembers that episode as sad and moving. He was to open the season at the Teatro Regio (Turin) with Andrea Chenier. While rehearsing with the orchestra and singers, at one point he put his baton against the music stand and interrupted the rehearsal: "I can't see the orchestra and the stage, I can't continue." A Maculopathy in his right eye takes away most of his vision. The other eye had been impaired years before.

Votto picked up, along with Victor de Sabata, Tullio Serafin and a few others, Toscanini's legacy after he left Italy in the first half of the 1930s to emigrate to the United States. Like Toscanini he always conducted from memory, without the need for a score. He was a teacher of singing. Among his pupils were sopranos Claudia Pinza Bozzolla and Franca Somigli. He is buried at Cimitero Maggiore di Milano.

== Commercial discography ==
External audio
- You may listen to Antonino Votto conducting Amilcare Ponchielli's opera La Gioconda with the Orchestra della RAI Torinoas and Maria Callas, Fedora Barbieri, Gianni Poggi, Paolo Silveri, Giulio Neri in 1952 here on archive.org

- Ponchielli: La Gioconda (Callas, Barbieri, Amadini, Poggi, Silveri, Neri; 1952) Cetra
- Puccini: La bohème (Callas, Moffo, di Stefano, Panerai, Zaccaria; 1956) EMI Classics
- Verdi: Un ballo in maschera (Callas, Ratti, Barbieri, di Stefano, Gobbi; 1956) EMI
- Bellini: La sonnambula (Callas, Ratti, Monti, Zaccaria; 1957) EMI
- Ponchielli: La Gioconda (Callas, Cossotto, Companeez, Ferraro, Cappuccilli, Vinco; 1959) EMI
- Puccini: La bohème (Scotto, Poggi, Gobbi, Modesti; 1961) Deutsche Grammophon
- Verdi: La traviata (Scotto, G.Raimondi, Bastianini; 1962) Deutsche Grammophon
