= Arturo Basile =

Italian conductor (1914–1968)

Arturo Basile in 1956

Arturo Basile (16 January 1914 – 21 May 1968) was an Italian conductor. He was known mostly for his work in the Italian operatic repertoire, especially Puccini and Verdi.

Basile was born in Syracuse, Sicily. When he was 12, he studied the oboe at the Giuseppe Verdi Conservatory in Turin, with Franco Alfano as music director at the time. His teachers included Giorgio Federico Ghedini. After graduating in 1933, he took up conducting, and was leading the Orchestra Sinfonica dell' EIAR by the early 1940s. In 1946, he took first prize in a conducting competition with Tullio Serafin heading the jury. He was soon recording and performing at the world's major opera houses with the leading singers of the day, including Maria Callas, Renata Tebaldi, Price, Tucker, Giorgio Tozzi and Giuseppe di Stefano. While his reputation was still on the ascent, he was killed in a car accident on May 21, 1968 at the age of 54, along with opera soprano Marika Galli. Basile was driving near the Italian city of Vercelli when his car swerved off the road and crashed into a large stone. Ironically, Basile had been negotiating with New York's Metropolitan Opera to fill the vacancy left by the May 13 death of conductor Franco Patane, who had been killed in a car accident.
