= Mario Filippeschi =

Italian opera singer

Mario Filippeschi (photo with 1948 dedication)

Mario Filippeschi (7 June 1907 in Montefoscoli – 25 December 1979 in Florence) was an Italian tenor, particularly associated with the Italian repertory, renowned for his ringing upper register.

Filippeschi studied the clarinet for two years as a teenager, before joining military service. After military discharge he began studying voice with a Neapolitan teacher, Mr. Vicidomini, and with an orchestra conductor and composer, Mr. Cataldi-Tassoni, in Milan, and later with Mr. Pessina, in Florence. He made his professional debut in Colorno, near Parma, as Edgardo in Lucia di Lammermoor, in 1937.

He quickly sang throughout Italy, France, Spain and Portugal, as well as Latin America. He first concentrated on lyrical roles such as the Duke in Rigoletto, Alfredo in La traviata, Rodolfo in La Bohème, Pinkerton in Madama Butterfly, etc., and was one of the few tenors of his generation to tackle with success such high lying roles as Arnold in Guglielmo Tell and Arturo in I puritani.

After the war, he began adding more dramatic roles to his repertory. In 1950, he appeared to great acclaim in Mexico, as Radames in Aida, and as Cavaradossi in Tosca, opposite the young Maria Callas.

Other notable roles included; Manrico in Il trovatore, Arrigo in I vespri siciliani, Alvaro in La forza del destino, Calaf in Turandot.

Filippeschi made several recordings, notably Pollione in Norma, opposite Maria Callas, and Carlo in Don Carlos, opposite Tito Gobbi and Boris Christoff.

Filippeschi also appeared in film versions of Lucia di Lammermoor and Rigoletto, in 1946.

== Sources ==
- Roland Mancini and Jean-Jacques Rouveroux, (orig. H. Rosenthal and J. Warrack, French edition), Guide de l’opéra, Les indispensables de la musique (Fayard, 1995). ISBN 2-213-59567-4
