= Fedora Barbieri =

Italian opera singer (1920–2003)

- Fedora Barbieri as Mrs. Meg Page in Falstaff, 1942 – 1943 (photo with dedication)
- Born: June 4, 1920; Trieste, Italy
- Died: 4 March 2003 (aged 82); Florence, Italy
- Occupation: Opera singer (mezzo-soprano) • actress

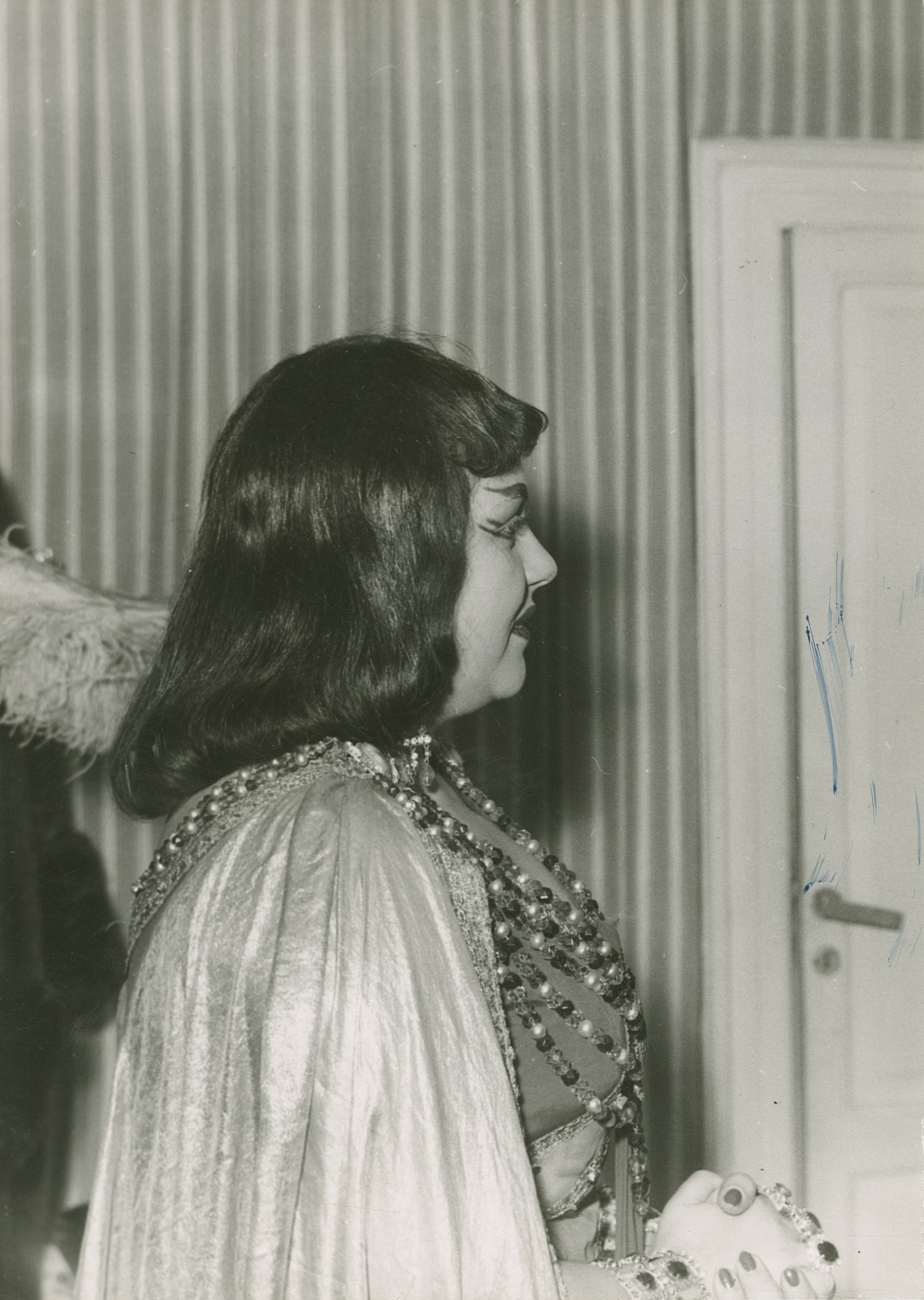
Fedora Barbieri in costume for the performance of Giuseppe Verdi's opera Aida, Teatro di San Carlo, Naples, 1955.

Fedora Barbieri (4 June 1920 – 4 March 2003) was an Italian dramatic mezzo-soprano and actress.

Barbieri was born in Trieste. She performed regularly in Florence for fifty years, and performed internationally through the years. She died, aged 82, in Florence.

== Career ==
After studying singing with Federico Bugamelli and Luigi Toffolo, she won an audition at age twenty to enter the school of the Teatro Comunale in Florence, where she studied with Giulia Tess. She then debuted in November 1940, as Fidalma in Il matrimonio segreto. Her Teatro alla Scala debut, where she was to have her greatest successes, came in 1942, as Meg Page.

She was one of the first performers to investigate and perform in early operas by Monteverdi and Pergolesi.

She made her debut at the Metropolitan Opera on 6 November 1950, as Princess Eboli in Verdi's Don Carlos. Altogether, she gave 95 performances there over 9 seasons, in 11 different roles. She also sang Eboli in the famous Luchino Visconti production for the Royal Opera House, Covent Garden's centenary, in 1958.

In 1956, the mezzo-soprano filmed Mistress Quickly, in Falstaff, for RAI, conducted by Tullio Serafin and directed by Herbert Graf, with Giuseppe Taddei and Scipio Colombo.

Though she never officially retired, she more or less discontinued performing live in the 1990s, making her career one of the longest in opera history. She sang last time on stage in 2000 (Mamma Lucia in Cavalleria Rusticana).

== Legacy ==
Although generally considered a formidable actress and singer in her own right, she is now mostly remembered for regularly partnering Maria Callas on- as well as off-stage during the 1950s. Many of their collaborations (together with other regular partners Giuseppe Di Stefano, Boris Christoff, Tito Gobbi, Rolando Panerai, and Tullio Serafin) were recorded by Fonit Cetra ("La Gioconda", 1952) and EMI. Her most famous portrayals included Amneris in Aïda, with Jussi Björling, Azucena in Il trovatore, Quickly in Falstaff, Eboli in Don Carlo, and Ulrica in Un ballo in maschera. Her 1951 performance of the Verdi Requiem, with Herva Nelli, di Stefano and Cesare Siepi, conducted by Arturo Toscanini, was issued by RCA.

Barbieri can be seen and heard in several operas issued on DVD, e.g. in the role of Madelon in Andrea Chénier, starring Plácido Domingo and conducted by Nello Santi; also as Giovanna in Rigoletto directed by Jean-Pierre Ponnelle, with Luciano Pavarotti and conducted by Riccardo Chailly; and as Mamma Lucia in Franco Zeffirelli's Cavalleria rusticana, again with Domingo and conducted by Georges Prêtre (all three recorded in her very mature age). In 1996, she sang and spoke in Jan Schmidt-Garre's film Opera Fanatic.

== Honour ==
- Italy: Knight Grand Cross of the Order of Merit of the Italian Republic (7 June 2000)
