= Gabriele Santini =

Italian conductor

- Gabriele Santini (photo with 1951 dedication)
- Occupation: conductor

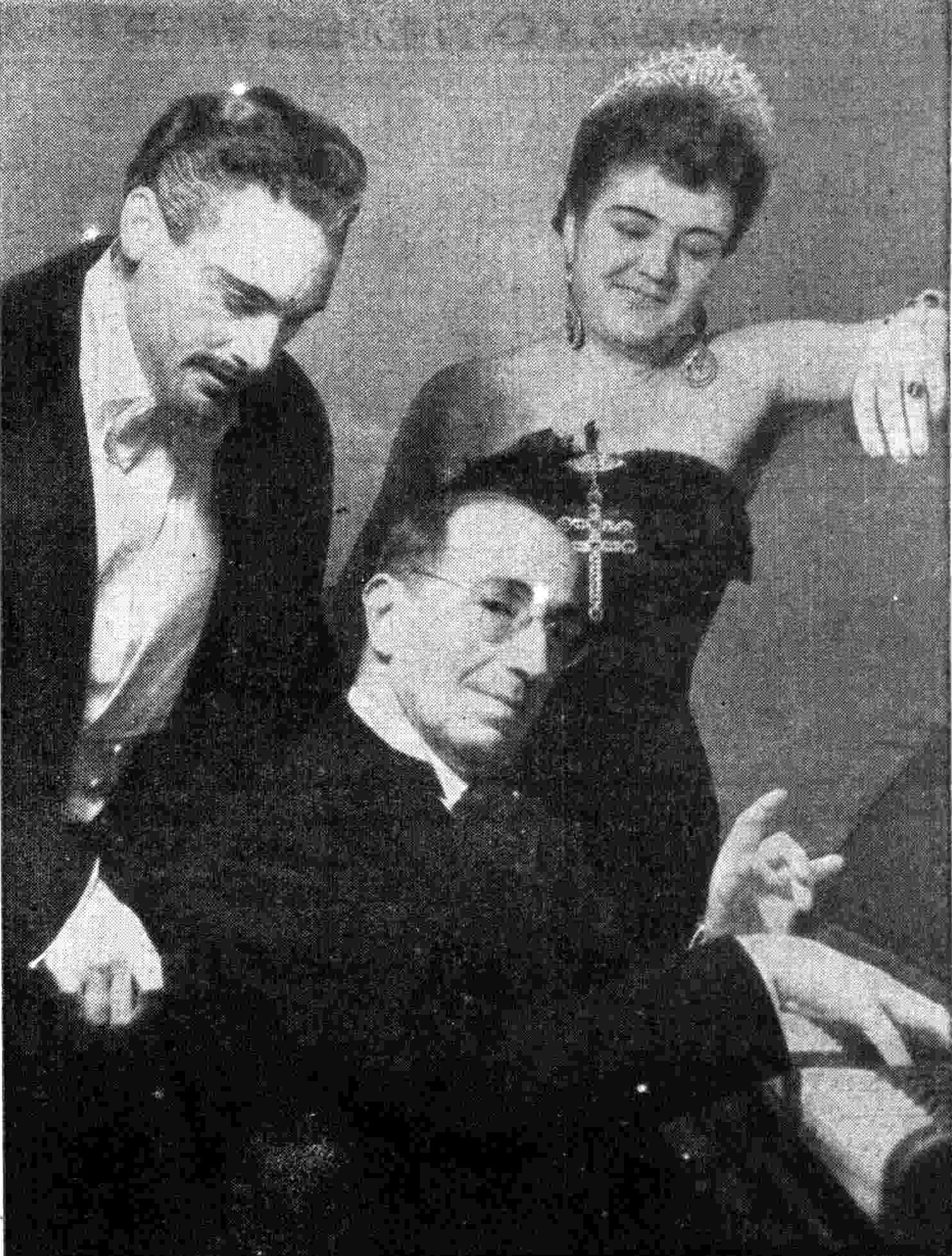
Gabriele Santini at piano, with Mario Del Monaco and Maria Caniglia

Gabriele Santini (20 January 1886, Perugia - 13 November 1964, Rome) was an Italian conductor, particularly associated with the Italian opera repertory.

He studied in Perugia and Bologna, and made his debut in 1906, as assistant conductor to Gino Marinuzzi and Arturo Toscanini, appearing with them throughout Italy.

He was particularly associated with La Scala in Milan, the San Carlo in Naples, and the Rome Opera, where he was artistic director from 1945 to 1962. He also made guest appearances at the Paris Opéra and the Royal Opera House in London.

He conducted several creations of Italian contemporary works notably by composers such as Umberto Giordano and Franco Alfano, but was especially admired as a rock-solid maestro of the old school in the standard Italian repertory. Considered one of great Verdi conductors of his generation, he left notable recordings of Simon Boccanegra and Don Carlos, both with Tito Gobbi and Boris Christoff, as well as La traviata with Maria Callas.

== Sources ==
- Le guide de l'opéra, R.Mancini & J.J.Rouvereux, (Fayard, 1986) ISBN 2-213-01563-5
