= Giuseppe Valdengo =

Italian baritone (1914–2007)

Valdengo in La forza del destino, Metropolitan Opera (New York), 1953

Giuseppe Valdengo (24 May 1914, Turin – 3 October 2007, Aosta) was an Italian operatic baritone. Opera News said that, "Although his timbre lacked the innate beauty of some of his baritone contemporaries, Valdengo's performances were invariably satisfying — bold and assured in attack but scrupulously musical."

== Biography ==
Valdengo first studied the cello and oboe before turning to vocal studies with Michele Accoriti in his native Turin. He made his operatic debut as Figaro in Il barbiere di Siviglia, at the Teatro Regio di Parma in 1936. Shortly thereafter he made his Teatro alla Scala debut, as Germont in La traviata. He was drafted into military service in 1939 by the Italian government and did not appear on the stage for the next three years. His opera career recommenced in 1942 with a lauded performance of Marcello in La bohème at Parma.

Valdengo made his American debut at the New York City Opera as Sharpless in Madama Butterfly in 1946. He remained on that company's roster through the spring 1948 season, singing the title role in Rigoletto, Tonio in Pagliacci, Escamillo in Carmen and Giorgio Germont in La traviata. He was also a regular performer at the Philadelphia La Scala Opera Company between 1946 and 1948, singing Amonasro in Aida, the Count di Luna in Il trovatore, Rigoletto, and Valentin in Charles Gounod's Faust. In September 1947 he made his San Francisco Opera debut as Valentin.

Valdengo first appearance at the Metropolitan Opera was on 19 December 1947, as Tonio with Licia Albanese as Nedda and Raoul Jobin as Canio. He remained at the Met for seven seasons, portraying such roles as Amonasro, Belcore in L'elisir d'amore, Figaro in Il barbiere di Siviglia, Lescaut in Manon Lescaut, Marcello in La bohème, and Paolo Albiani in Simon Boccanegra among others. His final and 121st performance at the Met was as Germont on January 27, 1954, with Jean Fenn as Violetta and Jan Peerce as Alfredo.

During the 1950s Valdengo sang in most of the principal European opera houses, most often portraying roles from the Verdi baritone repertory. Some of his notable engagements during the mid-1950s included appearances at Opéra de Paris as Rigoletto and Raimbaud in Le comte Ory for the 1955 Glyndebourne Festival where he later returned to sing the title role in Mozart's Don Giovanni. He also sang Captain Balstrode in Peter Grimes at the Rome Opera and the title role in Prince Igor at the Teatro Comunale di Bologna.

He also sang in other American houses. In 1953 he made his debut with the Philadelphia Grand Opera Company as Iago in Verdi's Otello, returning there to sing Sharpless (1954), Valentin (1955, 1959), and Enrico in Lucia di Lammermoor (1959). He retired from the stage in 1966 and taught in Turin. After his retirement he still recorded some buffo roles in Italy: Don Pasquale, Dr Bartolo and Dulcamara (see the Abridged discography). A famous pupil of him is the baritone Alessandro Corbelli. Valdengo published his autobiography Ho cantato con Toscanini in 1962.

Valdengo may be best-remembered for his NBC radio broadcasts of Otello (1947, as Iago), Aida (1949, as Amonasro), and Falstaff (1950, as the title role), with Arturo Toscanini conducting. (All of these operas were performed in concert versions.) The Toscanini Aida (with Herva Nelli in the name part) was simulcast on both television and radio, one of the first instances of such an event, and the telecast has been released on both VHS and DVD. Valdengo appeared in one film, MGM's The Great Caruso (1951), starring Mario Lanza in the title role.

== Selected Discography ==
- Verdi: Otello (Nelli, Vinay; Toscanini, 1947) RCA Victor
- Verdi: Aida (Nelli, Tucker; Toscanini, 1949; special re-takes in 1954) RCA Victor
- Puccini: Madama Butterfly (Steber, Madeira, Tucker; Rudolf, 1949) Columbia Records
- Verdi: Falstaff as Ford (Resnik, Warren, Elmo; Reiner, 1949) [live] Sony
- Puccini: Manon Lescaut (Kirsten, Bjoerling; Antonicelli, 1949) [live] Naxos
- Verdi: Simon Boccanegra as Paolo (Warren, Varnay, Tucker; Stiedry, 1950) [live] Sony
- Verdi: Falstaff (Nelli; Toscanini, 1950) RCA Victor
- Leoncavallo: Pagliacci (Amara, Tucker; Cleva, 1951) Columbia Records
- Verdi: Un ballo in maschera (Curtis-Verna, Tagliavini; Questa, 1954) Cetra
- Wolf-Ferrari: Il segreto di Susanna (Rizzieri; Questa, 1954) Cetra
- Donizetti: Don Pasquale as Malatesta (Rizzoli; Molinari-Pradelli, 1955) Philips
- Puccini: La bohème (Albanese, Schuh, di Stefano, Treigle; Cellini, 1959) [live] VAI, 2007
- Donizetti: L'elisir d'amore as Dulcamara (Ciano, Tagliavini, Maffeo; Ino Savini,19/27 August 1968) Supraphon/Fratelli Fabbri
- Donizetti: Don Pasquale as Don Pasquale( Nino Verchi, 1968) Fratelli Fabbri
- Rossini: Il barbiere di Siviglia as Bartolo (Guglielmi, Cappuccilli; G. Zani, 1969) Supraphon/Fratelli Fabbri
- Italian Songs with Bonus Tracks from Operatic Recital by Giuseppe Valdengo (Universal Music Group, 2014) Decca Most Wanted Recitals

== Videography ==
- Verdi: Aida (Nelli, Tucker; Toscanini, 1949) [live] RCA
- Puccini: La rondine (Carteri, Gismondo; Bellezza, Colosimo, 1958) [live] Hardy/VAI

== Sources ==
- The Metropolitan Opera Encyclopedia, edited by David Hamilton, (Simon & Schuster, New York, 1987), ISBN 0-671-61732-X
- Opera News, Obituaries, February 2008.
