= Giuseppe Taddei =

Italian opera singer (1916–2010)

- Taddei (photo with 1949 dedication)
- Born: June 26, 1916; Genoa, Italy
- Died: June 2, 2010 (aged 94)
- Occupation: Opera singer (baritone)

Taddei as Falstaff at his Metropolitan Opera debut in 1985

Giuseppe Taddei (26 June 1916 – 2 June 2010) was an Italian baritone, who, during his career, performed multiple operas composed by numerous composers.

Taddei was born in Genoa, Italy, and studied in Rome, where he made his professional debut in 1936 as the Herald in Wagner's Lohengrin. He sang at the Rome Opera until he was conscripted into the army in 1942. After the war, he resumed his opera career and appeared for two seasons at the Vienna State Opera. He made his debut in London in 1947, at the Cambridge Theatre. The following year, 1948, saw his debut at the Salzburg Festival, La Scala in Milan, and the Teatro di San Carlo in Naples.

Taddei made his debut at the Teatro Colón in Buenos Aires in 1953 as Scarpia in Tosca and sang often there until 1965. His American debut took place at the San Francisco Opera in 1957, followed by his appearance with Lyric Opera of Chicago in 1959. He sang regularly at the Royal Opera House in London from 1960 to 1967.

Taddei was equally effective in comedy and drama. His acting repertoire included the two Figaros, from The Marriage of Figaro and The Barber of Seville, both Leporello and Don Giovanni in Don Giovanni, both Belcore and Dulcamara in L'elisir d'amore, as well as Don Carlo in Ernani, Macbeth in Macbeth, Rigoletto in Rigoletto, Amonasro in Aida, Iago in Otello, Falstaff in Falstaff, Barnaba in La Gioconda, Gérard in Andrea Chénier, and Scarpia in Tosca, among others.

Taddei's vocal longevity allowed him to continue singing into old age. He was 69 years old when he made his first appearance at the Metropolitan Opera, on 25 September 1985, in the title role of Falstaff.

He left many recordings, notably as Figaro in The Marriage of Figaro and Leporello in Don Giovanni in the Carlo Maria Giulini renditions, the title role of Don Giovanni, conducted by Max Rudolf, Macbeth, opposite Birgit Nilsson, in Macbeth, conducted by Thomas Schippers, and as Scarpia in Tosca and Falstaff, both conducted by Herbert von Karajan.

== Discography ==
Year – Opera – Composer – Director – Singer – Character

1940–1949

- 1941 – Andrea Chénier (Giordano) – Oliviero de Fabritiis: Giuseppe Taddei (Pietro Fléville)
- 1941 – Andrea Chénier (Giordano) – Oliviero de Fabritiis: Giuseppe Taddei (Fouquier-Tinville)
- 1949 – Gianni Schicchi (Puccini) – Alfredo Simonetto: Giuseppe Taddei (Gianni Schicchi)

1950–1959

- 1950 – Il barbiere di Siviglia (Rossini) – Fernando Previtali: Giuseppe Taddei (Figaro)
- 1950 – Falstaff (Verdi) – Mario Rossi: Giuseppe Taddei (John Falstaff)
- 1951 – Ernani (Verdi) – Fernando Previtali: Giuseppe Taddei (Don Carlo)
- 1951 – La traviata (Verdi) – Oliviero de Fabritiis: Giuseppe Taddei (Giorgio Germont)
- 1951 – Aida (Verdi) – Oliviero de Fabritiis: Giuseppe Taddei (Amonasro)
- 1951 – La Bohème (Puccini) – Gabriele Santini: Giuseppe Taddei (Marcello)
- 1952 – Guillaume Tell (Rossini) – Mario Rossi: Giuseppe Taddei (Guglielmo Tell)
- 1952 – Adriana Lecouvreur (Cilèa) – Gabriele Santini: Giuseppe Taddei (Michonnet)
- 1952 – La traviata (Verdi) – Gabriele Santini: Giuseppe Taddei (Giorgio Germont)
- 1953 – Madama Butterfly (Puccini) – Angelo Questa: Giuseppe Taddei (Sharpless)
- 1953 – Linda di Chamounix (Donizetti) – Alfredo Simonetto: Giuseppe Taddei (Antonio)
- 1953 – L'elisir d'amore (Donizetti) – Gianandrea Gavazzeni: Giuseppe Taddei (Belcore)
- 1953 – Die Zauberflöte (Mozart) – Herbert von Karajan: Giuseppe Taddei (Papageno)
- 1953 – Eugen Onegin (Tchaikovsky) – Nino Sanzogno: Giuseppe Taddei (Evgeni Oneguin)
- 1954 – Tosca (Puccini) – Oliviero de Fabritiis: Giuseppe Taddei (Baron Scarpia)
- 1954 – Rigoletto (Verdi) – Angelo Questa: Giuseppe Taddei (Rigoletto)
- 1955 – Otello (Verdi) – Franco Capuana: Giuseppe Taddei (Yago)
- 1954 – L'elisir d'amore (Donizetti) – Gianandrea Gavazzeni: Giuseppe Taddei (Il dottor Dulcamara) DVD
- 1955 – Don Giovanni (Mozart) – Max Rudolf: Giuseppe Taddei (Don Giovanni)
- 1955 – Les Huguenots (Meyerbeer) – Tullio Serafin: Giuseppe Taddei (Nevers)
- 1955 – Andrea Chénier (Giordano) – Angelo Questa: Giuseppe Taddei (Charles Gérard)
- 1955 – Tosca (Puccini) – Vincenzo Belleza: Giuseppe Taddei (Baron Scarpia)
- 1956 – Moïse et Pharaon (Rossini) – Tullio Serafin: Giuseppe Taddei (Faraone)
- 1956 – Linda di Chamounix (Donizetti) – Tullio Serafin: Giuseppe Taddei (Antonio)
- 1956 – Falstaff (Verdi) – Tullio Serafin: Giuseppe Taddei (John Falstaff) DVD
- 1957 – I vespri siciliani (Verdi) – Tullio Serafin: Giuseppe Taddei (Guido de Monforte)
- 1957 – Moïse et Pharaon (Rossini) – Tullio Serafin: Giuseppe Taddei (Faraone)
- 1957 – Tosca (Puccini) – Tullio Serafin: Giuseppe Taddei (Baron Scarpia)
- 1958 – Otello (Verdi) – Thomas Beecham: Giuseppe Taddei (Iago)
- 1958 – L'elisir d'amore (Donizetti) – Tullio Serafin: Giuseppe Taddei (Il dottor Dulcamara)
- 1959 – Le nozze di Figaro (Mozart) – Carlo Maria Giulini: Giuseppe Taddei (Figaro)
- 1959 – Don Giovanni (Mozart) – Carlo Maria Giulini: Giuseppe Taddei (Leporello)

1960–1969

- 1960 – Macbeth II (Verdi) – Vittorio Gui: Giuseppe Taddei (Macbeth)
- 1960 – Les Pêcheurs de perles (Bizet) – Armando La Rosa Parodi: Giuseppe Taddei (Zurga)
- 1961 – La forza del destino (Verdi) – Fernando Previtali: Giuseppe Taddei (Don Carlos de Vargas)
- 1961 – Le nozze di Figaro (Mozart) – Carlo Maria Giulini: Giuseppe Taddei (Figaro)
- 1962 – Tosca (Puccini) – Herbert von Karajan: Giuseppe Taddei (Baron Scarpia)
- 1962 – Tosca (Puccini) – Carlo Felice Cillario: Giuseppe Taddei (Baron Scarpia)
- 1962 – Così fan tutte (Mozart) – Karl Böhm: Giuseppe Taddei (Guglielmo)
- 1962 – Die Meistersinger von Nürnberg (Wagner) – Lovro Von Matacic: Giuseppe Taddei (Sachs)
- 1963 – La Bohème (Puccini) – Herbert von Karajan: Giuseppe Taddei (Schaunard)
- 1964 – Macbeth II (Verdi) – Thomas Schippers: Giuseppe Taddei (Macbeth)
- 1964 – Knias Igor (Borodin) – Armando La Rosa Parodi: Giuseppe Taddei (Igor Sviatoslavich)
- 1965 – I Pagliacci (Leoncavallo) – Herbert von Karajan: Giuseppe Taddei (Tonio)
- 1966 – Simon Boccanegra (Verdi) – Giuseppe Patanè: Giuseppe Taddei (Simon Bocanegra)
- 1967 – L'elisir d'amore (Donizetti) – Gianandrea Gavazzeni: Giuseppe Taddei (Belcore) DVD
- 1967 – L'elisir d'amore (Donizetti) – Gianandrea Gavazzeni: Giuseppe Taddei (Belcore)
- 1968 – Ernani (Verdi) – Manno Wolf-Ferrari: Giuseppe Taddei (Don Carlo)
- 1969 – Belisario (Donizetti) – Gianandrea Gavazzeni: Giuseppe Taddei (Belisario)

1970–1979

- 1973 – Caterina Cornaro (Donizetti) – Alfredo Silipigni: Giuseppe Taddei (Lusignano)
- 1974 – Luisa Miller (Verdi) – Alberto Erede: Giuseppe Taddei (Miller)
- 1974 – Guillaume Tell (Rossini) – Jacques Delacôte: Giuseppe Taddei (Guglielmo Tell)
- 1974 – Un giorno di regno ossial Il finto Stanislao (Verdi) – Piero Bellugi: Giuseppe Taddei (Barón di Kelbar)
- 1975 – Don Pasquale (Donizetti) – Carlo Franci: Giuseppe Taddei (Don Pasquale)
- 1976 – Le Convenienze ed Inconvenienze Teatrali (Donizetti) – Carlo Franci: Giuseppe Taddei (Mamma Agata)
- 1977 – Adriana Lecouvreur (Cilèa) – Gianandrea Gavazzeni: Giuseppe Taddei (Michonnet)

1980–1989

- 1980 – Falstaff (Verdi) – Herbert von Karajan: Giuseppe Taddei (John Falstaff)
- 1982 – Falstaff (Verdi) – Herbert von Karajan: Giuseppe Taddei (John Falstaff) DVD

1990–1999

- 1992 – Manon Lescaut (Puccini) – James Levine: Giuseppe Taddei (Geronte di Ravoir)

== Sources ==
- The Metropolitan Opera Encyclopedia, edited by David Hamilton ISBN 0-671-61732-X
- The Metropolitan Opera Guide to Recorded Opera, edited by Paul Gruber ISBN 0-393-03444-5
- Obituary in Der Standard (in German)
