= Paolo Silveri =

Italian opera singer (1913–2001)

- Paolo Silveri (photo with 1949 dedication)
- Occupation: opera singer

Paolo Silveri (b. Ofena, 28 December 1913 – d. Rome, 3 July 2001) was an Italian baritone, particularly associated with the Italian repertory, one of the finest Verdi baritones of his time.

== Biography ==
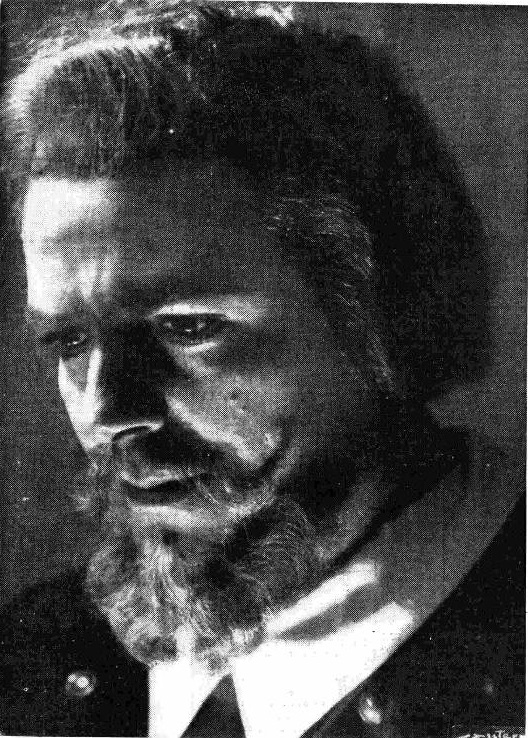
Paolo Silveri

Silveri studied first in Capestrano (L'Aquila) then in Milano with Perugini, and later in Rome with Riccardo Stracciari and the bass Giulio Cirino (father of Silveri's wife Delia), making his debut there as Hans Schwartz, a bass role, in Die Meistersinger von Nürnberg in 1939.

After further studies, he made new debut as a baritone in 1944, as Germont in Rome.

Thereafter, he rapidly sang throughout Italy, notably at the San Carlo in Naples, and La Scala in Milan, debut as de Luna in 1949. Also appeared at the Royal Opera House in London, in 1946, and at the Paris Opéra, debut in 1951, as Renato.

Silveri made his debut in the USA at the Metropolitan Opera in 1950, as Don Giovanni with Fritz Reiner conducting. There he also sang Rigoletto and Posa.

He attempted the role of Otello in Dublin in 1959, thus being one of a few singers to professionally perform both as a bass, baritone and tenor, but quickly reverted to baritone roles. He was especially noted for his interpretations of Verdi operas and some other roles like Scarpia (Tosca), Figaro (Il Barbiere di Siviglia), Guglielmo Tell and Don Giovanni.

He can be heard on complete recordings of Nabucco, La traviata, Il trovatore, Simon Boccanegra, Don Carlo, La Gioconda, and Tosca.

Silveri retired from the stage in 1968 after a last performance of Rigoletto in Budapest with his daughter Silvia in the role of Gilda, and taught in Rome, where he died at age 87 in the summer of 2001.
