= Gianandrea Gavazzeni =

Italian conductor and composer

- Gianandrea Gavazzeni (photo with 1950 dedication)
- Occupation: Conductor

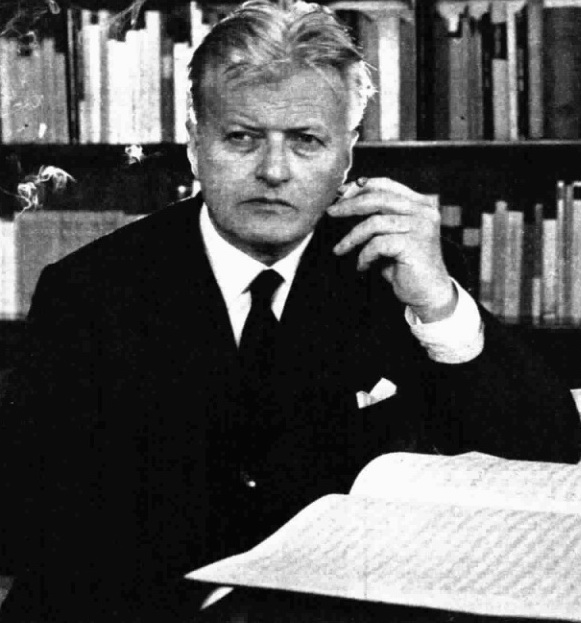
Gianandrea Gavazzeni

Gianandrea Gavazzeni (25 July 1909 – 5 February 1996) was an Italian pianist, conductor (especially of opera), composer and musicologist.

Gavazzeni was born in Bergamo. For almost 50 years, starting from 1948, he was principal conductor at La Scala, Milan, from 1966 to 1968, being its music and artistic director.

He had his Metropolitan Opera debut on 11 October 1976. He conducted eight performances of Giuseppe Verdi's Il trovatore that year at the Met.

His compositions include concertos such as 'Concerto bergamasco'; 'The Song of St Alexander'; and sonatas.

His last wife was the soprano Denia Mazzola-Gavazzeni. In January 1993, at age 83, he conducted Jules Massenet's Esclarmonde at Teatro Massimo di Palermo, with his wife singing the title role. It was the first time he had conducted this opera.

Gianandrea Gavazzeni died on 5 February 1996.
