= Boris Christoff =

Bulgarian bass singer

- Борис Кирилов Христов
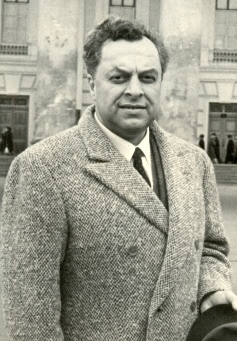
- Born: 18 May 1914; Plovdiv, Bulgaria
- Died: 28 June 1993 (aged 79); Rome, Italy
- Resting place: Central Sofia Cemetery; 42°42′48.1″N 023°19′58.5″E
- Citizenship: Bulgarian, Italian
- Education: Sofia University, Kingdom of Bulgaria (D.JUR.)
- Occupation: Opera singer (bass)
- Spouse: Franca de Rensis
- Parent(s): Kyryl Christov (father); Rayna Teodorova (mother)
- Relatives: Tito Gobbi (brother-in-law)
- Awards: Léonie Sonning Music Prize; Commendatore Ordine al Merito della Repubblica Italiana
- Website: borischristoff.com

Boris Christoff (Bulgarian: Борис Кирилов Христов, romanized: Boris Kirilov Hristov, IPA: [boˈris ˈkiriɫof ˈxristof]; 18 May 1914 – 28 June 1993) was a Bulgarian opera singer, widely considered one of the greatest basses of the 20th century.

== Early life ==
Boris Christoff (photo with 1948 dedication)

He was born in Plovdiv on 18 May 1914 to parents Kiril Christov and Rayna Teodorova. His grand-father Hristo Sovichanov had been a famous cantor at Bitola (then in the Ottoman Empire). Where he was singing in the Bulgarian Exarchist church, during the service many other believers (Turks, Jews) gathered in front of the church entrance to listen to him. Being also a Bulgarian revolutionary, as well as his son Kiril, after the defeat of the Ilinden–Preobrazhenie Uprising, they moved to Bulgaria. All three of Hristo's children were good singers, Kiril (Boris Christoff's father) was a tenor, sang at secular and church choirs, sang also for Radio Sofia and for the Institute of Music at the BAS.

Boris Christoff demonstrated early his singing talent and sang at the famous choir Gusla. In 1938 he graduated in law and started a career as a magistrate. He continued singing in his spare time in the Gusla Chorus in Sofia, achieving an enormous success as the chorus soloist in 1940; he was also singing at the choir of the St. Alexander Nevsky Cathedral, Sofia and the Academic Choir. Thanks to a government grant, Christoff left in May 1942 for Italy where he was tutored for two years in the core Italian bass repertoire by the great baritone of an earlier generation, Riccardo Stracciari.

== Performance career ==
After two visits in Bulgaria in 1943, Boris Christoff went to Austria. He took lessons in Wien, Prague and Salzbourg and had several guest appearances and recitals in Wien and Dresden. In 1944 he was arrested and sent to a prison camp near Feldkirch. He was released from it in May 1945 by the French troops. The commanding colonel, having heard his singing, helped him go to Italy. Later, Boris Hristov made every effort to find this person ("He was my savior!"), but to no avail.

His first concert in Italy was in December 1945 in Rome with the Symphony orchestra of the Santa Cecilia Academy of Music, and was dedicated to Bulgarian and Russian music. Christoff made his operatic debut as Colline in La bohème at Reggio Calabria on 12 March 1946. In following years Christoff appeared in a number of roles at Milan's La Scala, Venice's La Fenice, the Rome Opera, Covent Garden in London, the opera theatres in Naples, Barcelona, Lisbon, Rio de Janeiro, etc.

In 1950 he was invited to sing at the Metropolitan Opera in New York City but was refused entry into the USA as a result of the McCarran Immigration Act, which banned citizens of Eastern bloc countries from entering the country. The role was instead filled by the young Italian basso, Cesare Siepi. After the restrictions were loosened, Christoff made an operatic debut in the United States in 1956 at the San Francisco Opera. He refused any further invitations to the Metropolitan and never appeared there. After a brief absence from the scene due to brain tumour surgery in 1964, Christoff resumed his career.

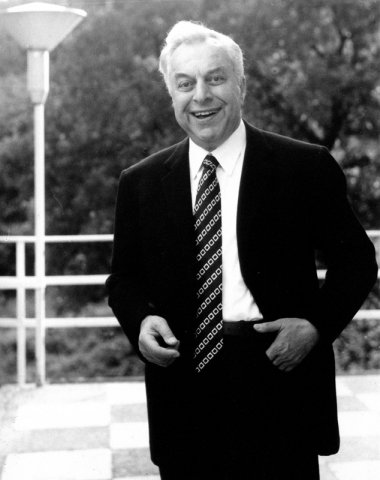
Boris Christoff in Stara Zagora, Bulgaria, 1985

In the 1970s Christoff on-stage performances became more infrequent. In St. Alexander Nevsky Cathedral in Sofia he recorded bulgarian and russian religious chants, together with the choir of the cathedral and the conductor Angel Popkonstantinov. Boris Christoff took an active part in the very work of creating the record. In 1978, he again recorded in the same cathedral Liturgia Domestica by Alexander Grechaninov, with the participation of the Bulgarian Choir Chapel Svetoslav Obretenov and a small string ensemble from the Symphony Orchestra of the Bulgarian Radio and conductor Georgi Robev. This is the first recording in the world of the Domestic Liturgy, and for the first time an orchestra was included in its performance, albeit a small one.

He brought his career to an end with a final concert at the Accademia di Bulgaria in Rome on 22 June 1986. He died in Rome in 1993 and his body was returned to Bulgaria, lay in repose in St. Alexander Nevski Cathedral and was buried in section 46 of Sofia Central Cemetery.

== Voice, repertoire, character ==
Boris Christoff had an excellent voice with a distinctive dark tone. Although it was not as large as some other bass voices, he had no trouble making an impact in big spaces like the San Francisco Opera. Owing to his stage presence and dramatic temperament, he was a worthy heir to the grand tradition of Slavonic basses exemplified by Fyodor Stravinsky, Lev Sibiriakov, Vladimir Kastorsky, Feodor Chaliapin, Alexander Kipnis and Mark Reizen, among others. He sang mostly in Verdi and the Russian repertoire, and was also a refined performer of vocal chamber music. Among his most famous roles were those of Tsar Boris (Mussorgsky - Boris Godunov), Philip II (Verdi - Don Carlo), Mephistopheles (Gounod - Faust and Boito - Mefistofele), Ivan Susanin (Glinka - A Life for the Tsar), Zaccaria (Verdi - Nabucco), Tsar Ivan (Rimsky-Korsakov - Ivan the Terrible), Dosifei (Mussorgsky - Khovanshchina), Gomez da Silva (Verdi - Ernani), Fiesco (Verdi - Simon Boccanegra), Attila (Verdi - Attila), Padre Guardiano (Verdi - La forza del destino), Galitzky and Kontchak (Borodin - Prince Igor) and others.

Christoff made studio recordings of eight operas (Don Carlo, Boris Godunov and Faust twice each) and numerous live recordings (radio or stage performances). He was much admired as song singer and he recorded more than 200 Russian songs by Mussorgsky (he was the first to record all his 63 songs), Tchaikovsky, Rimsky-Korsakov, Glinka, Borodin, Cui, Balakirev as well as traditional songs, mostly with piano accompaniment.

He made the tradition of studio recordings of Boris Godunov with the same basso singing three roles (Boris, Varlaam, Pimen). In 1952, he participated in the widely known recording of this opera in Paris, in which at the suggestion of the conductor Issay Dobrowen he performed all three bass roles—Boris Godunov, Varlaam and Pimen— three very diverse roles, which he distinguished characteristically and, according to musicologist Marcel Clavery, their only common feature was the beauty of the singer's timbre. The recording brought Boris Hristov his first high award—the grand international prize for a gramophone record (1953). In 1963 he was invited for the second time to record Boris Godunov in Paris, again performing all three bass roles. Нe suggested that the choir of the Sofia Opera be invited as well. An EMI representative was sent for an audition in Sofia, who was convinced of Boris Hristov's judgement, and so the choir took part in the recording conducted by André Cluytens, called triumphal.

While he was a grand performer on stage, Christoff had difficult off-stage relations with some fellow singers and producers, which sometimes grew into public scandals. In 1955 he fell out with Maria Callas during the performances of Medea at the Rome Opera. In 1961 his contract with La Scala was terminated after an open conflict with fellow Bulgarian Nicolai Ghiaurov. In fact, Boris Christoff opened the way for the Bulgarian singers Nikolay Ghiaurov and Dimitar Uzunov to La Scala—it is entirely his merit to attract them as his partners in Boris Godunov. The ambitious Ghiaurov, whose brother Kostadin Ghiaurov was a senior functionary of the Bulgarian Communist Party, began to speak out against him and call him a "fascist", and Boris Christoff blamed him for collaborating with the Bulgarian communist regime. The communist regime's hatred for Christoff who was not even allowed to go to Bulgaria for his father's funeral pushed Ghiaurov further into rivalry with Christoff. Herbert von Karajan tried to make Boris Christoff sing the title role in Don Giovanni which would have been inappropriate for his range; this prompted him to sever relations with von Karajan.

He was the brother-in-law of the Italian baritone Tito Gobbi.

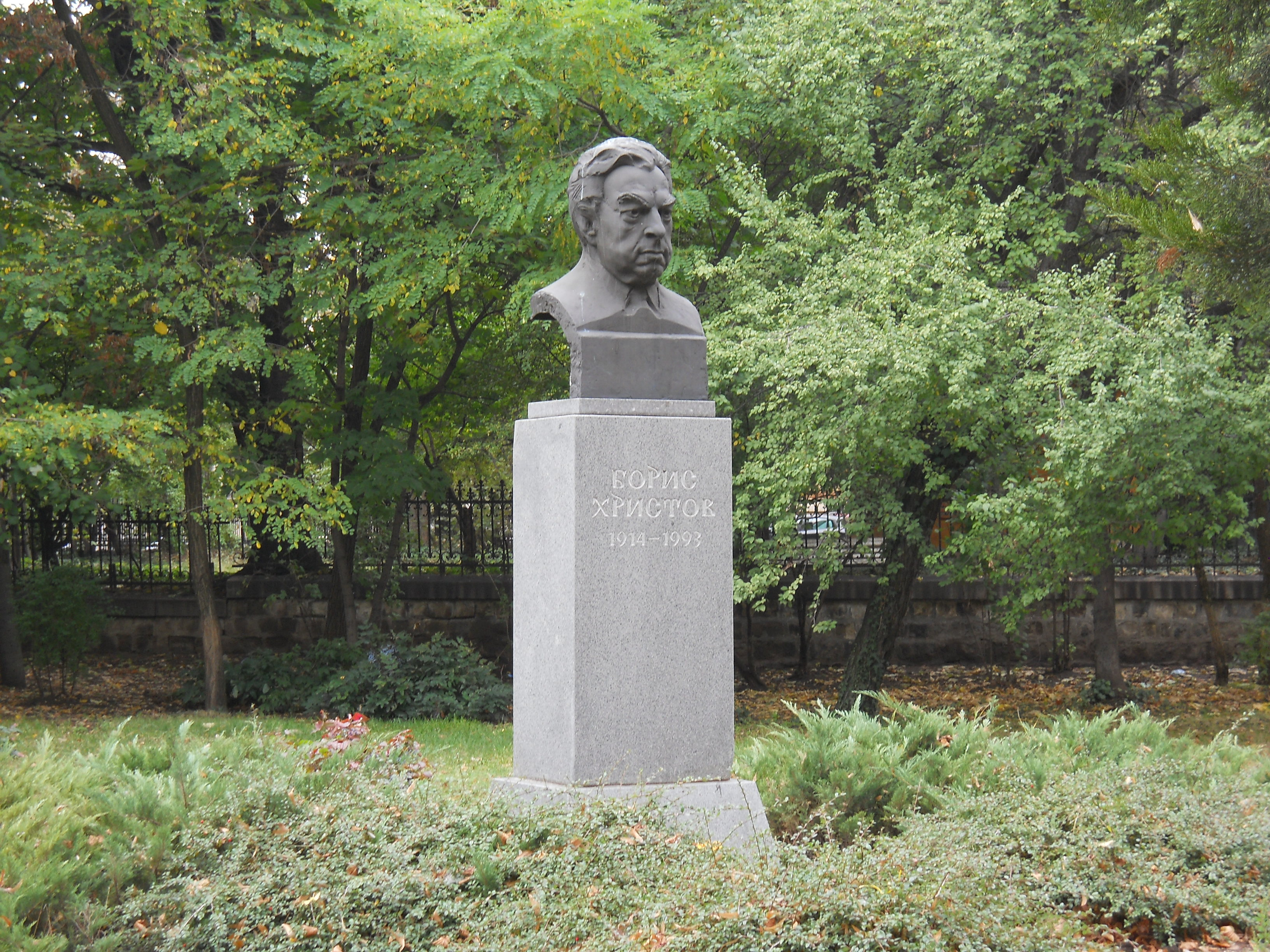
A Monument of Boris Christoff near Alexander Nevsky Cathedral in Sofia, Bulgaria

== Recordings ==
Many recordings are available. The following list contains just a few.

- His complete songs by Mussorgsky are available, produced by EMI.
- He recorded the Verdi Requiem 3 times, once under Tullio Serafin in Rome 1959, once with Herbert von Karajan and once with Bruno Bartoletti.
- Two recordings of Boris Godunov are available with Christoff singing three roles: Boris, Pimen, and Father Varlaam.
- Two performances in major Wagner roles are available, both sung in Italian: Gurnemanz in Parsifal conducted in Rome 1950 by Vittorio Gui, and Pogner the goldsmith in Die Meistersinger von Nürnberg, conducted (studio) by Lovro von Matačić in Torino 1962.
- Lugano Recital 1976 [DVD]

== Awards ==
- Commendatore della Repubblica italiana
- People's artist of Bulgaria
- Doctor honoris causa of the Opera de Paris
- Comandante dos Cavaleiros dos Santos Apóstolos Pedro e Paulo (Brasil)

Boris Christov is the recipient of numerous music awards, including the Grand Prix du Disque (1953) – the highest international award of the French Academy for Gramophone Recordings, Academie du Disque Français (1953, 1957), Academie Charles Cros (1953, 1954, 1955, 1956, 1957, 1958), Edison Award (1964), Sonning Award (1969; Denmark) and others.

== Honors ==
- A rocky cliff forming Aytos Point on the coast of Bransfield Strait, eastern Livingston Island, Antarctica is named after him.

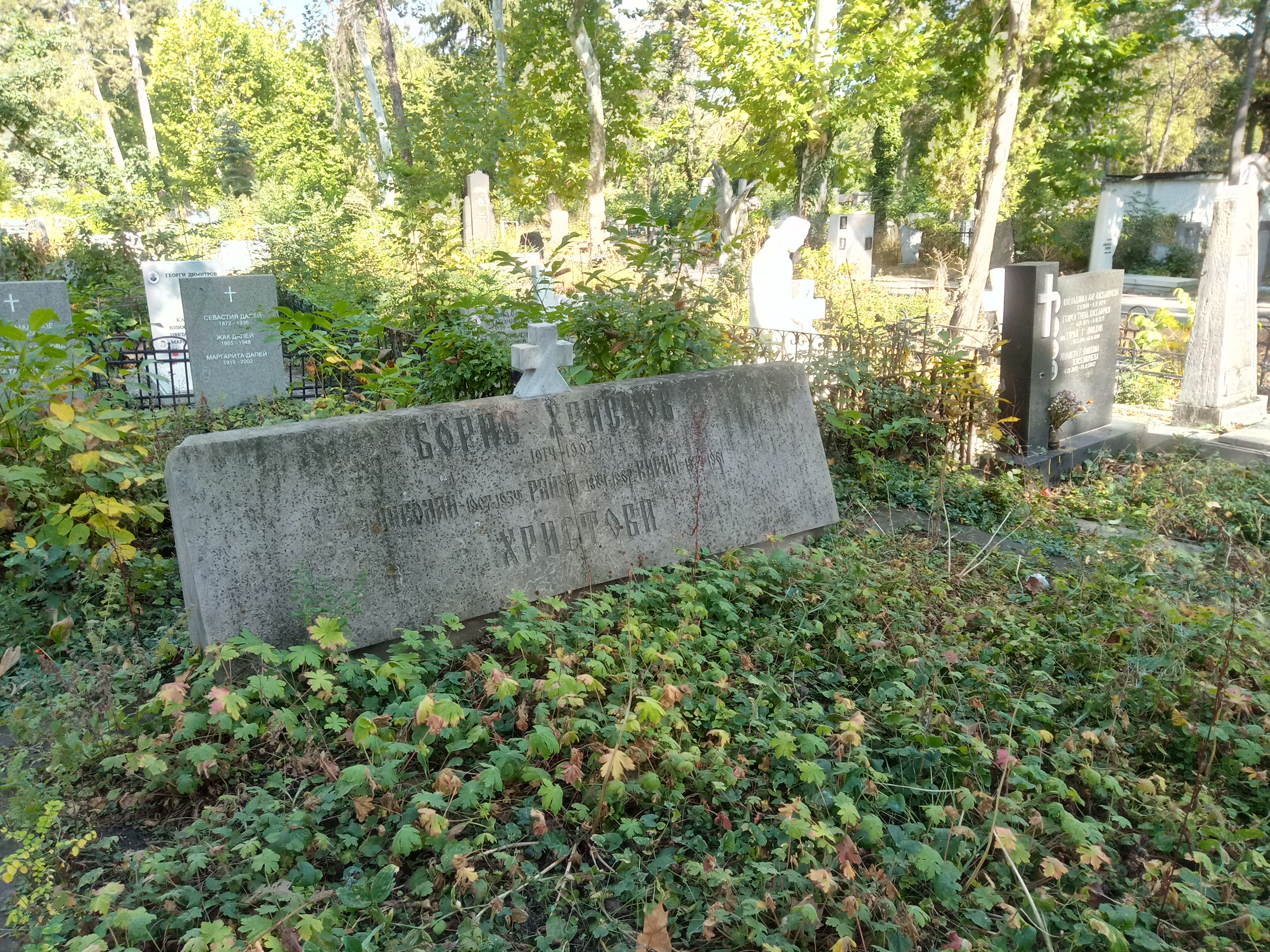
The Grave of Boris Christoff and his parents at Sofia Central Cemetery (42°42′48.1″N 023°19′58.5″E)
