= Georg Stahlberg =

Estonian singer and music pedagogue

Georg Karl Stahlberg (15 March 1866 Tartu – 6 March 1942 Tartu) was an Estonian opera singer (bass) and music pedagogue.

In 1890 he graduated from the University of Tartu in agriculture. He taught singing in 1894 in St. Petersburg at O. Seffer; in 1895 in Köln at B. Stolzenberg; and from 1896 to 1897 in Venice at Antonio Selva. From 1898 to 1902 he sang at the Hamburg State Opera. In 1902 he returned to Tartu. He became a music pedagogue and also sang in oratorios and operas in Estonia and abroad. From 1922 to 1928 he taught at Tartu Music School. His students included Leenart Neuman, Benno Hansen, Rudolf Jõks, Aarne Viisimaa, Martin Taras, Arno Niitof.
