= Attila (opera) =

Opera by Giuseppe Verdi

- Opera by Giuseppe Verdi
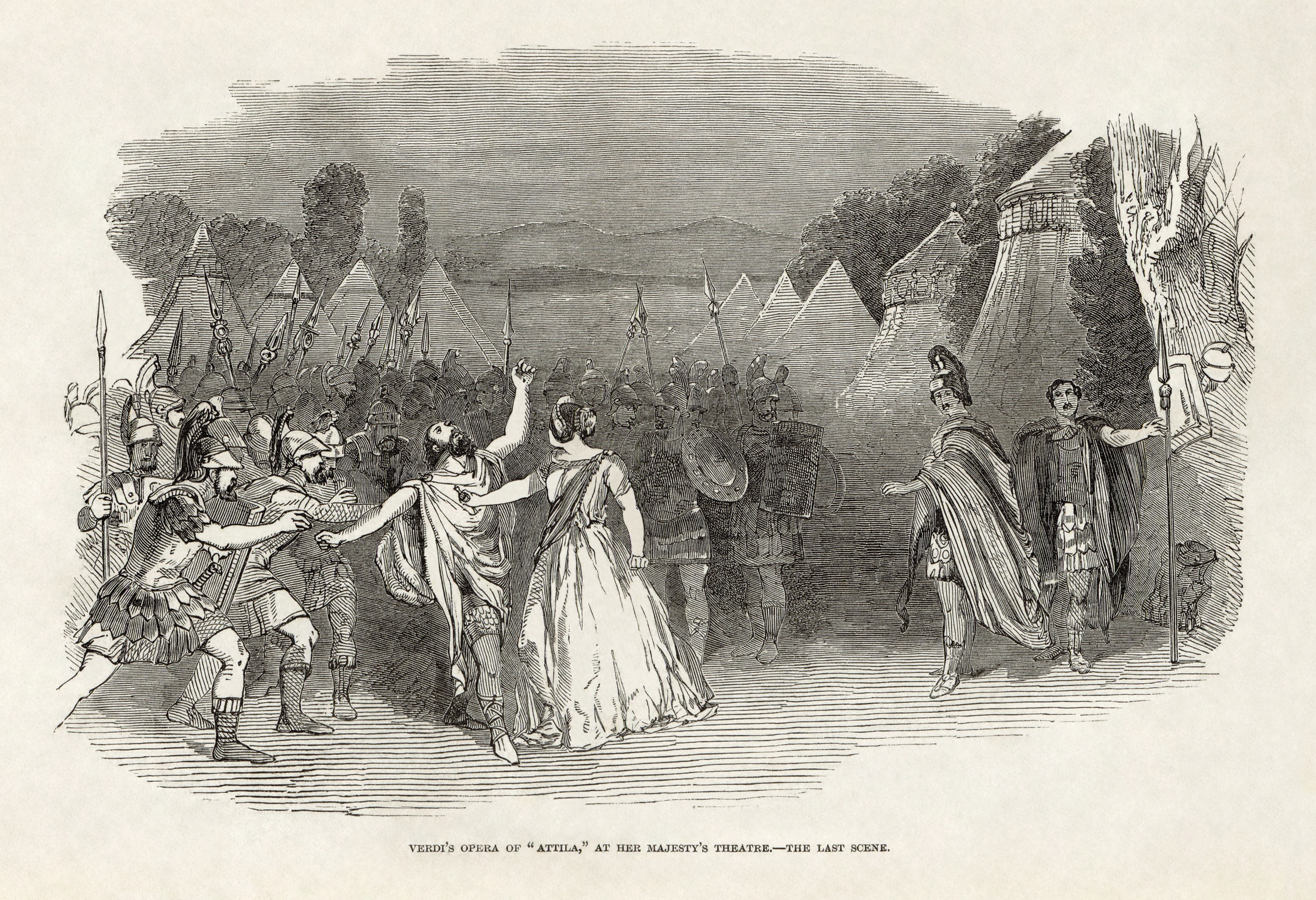
- Last scene, as performed in London in 1848
- Librettist: Temistocle Solera and Francesco Maria Piave
- Language: Italian
- Based on: Zacharias Werner's 1809 play Attila, König der Hunnen (Attila, King of the Huns)
- Premiere: 17 March 1846; Teatro La Fenice, Venice

Attila is an opera in a prologue and three acts by Giuseppe Verdi to an Italian libretto by Temistocle Solera, based on the 1809 play Attila, König der Hunnen (Attila, King of the Huns) by Zacharias Werner. The opera received its first performance at La Fenice in Venice on 17 March 1846.

Ezio's act 2 aria of heroic resolution "È gettata la mia sorte" (My lot is cast, I am prepared for any warfare) is a fine example of a characteristic Verdian genre, and it achieved fame in its own time with audiences in the context of the adoption of a liberal constitution by Ferdinand II. Other contemporary comment praised the work as suitable for the "political education of the people", while, in contrast, others criticised the opera as "Teutonic" in nature.

== Composition history ==
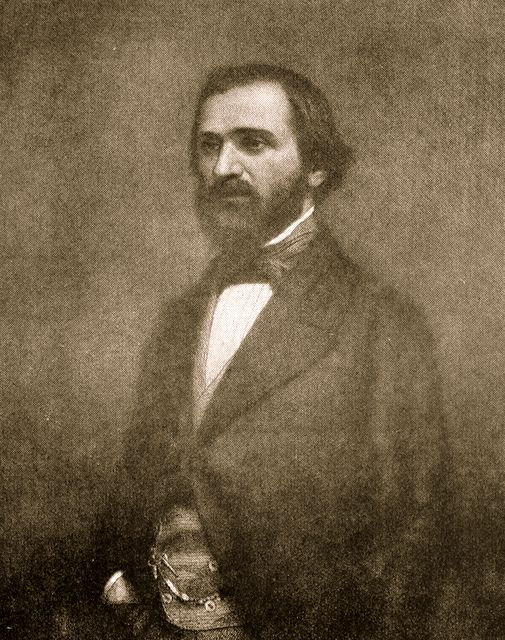
Giuseppe Verdi

Verdi had read the ultra-Romantic play in April 1844, probably introduced to it by his friend Andrea Maffei who had written a synopsis. A letter to Francesco Maria Piave (with whom he had worked on both Ernani and I due Foscari) had included the subject of Attila as opera number 10 on a list of nine other possible projects, and in that same letter, he encouraged Piave to read the play, which musicologist Julian Budden describes as having "sprung from the wilder shores of German literary romanticism [and which contains] all the Wagnerian apparatus – the Norns, Valhalla, the sword of Wodan [sic], the gods of light and the gods of darkness." He continues: "It is an extraordinary Teutonic farrago to have appealed to Verdi."

=== Verdi works with Solera ===
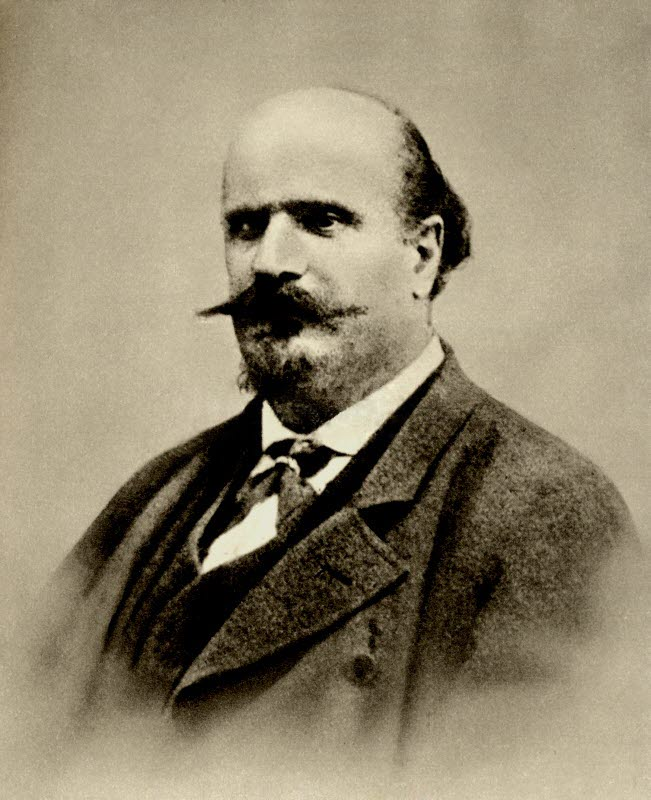
Librettist Temistocle Solera

But, as Attila was to be the second opera Verdi would be writing for Venice, he appears to have changed his mind about working with Piave as the librettist and then convinced him to relinquish the project, seemingly preferring to work with Solera, who had been his librettist for both Nabucco and I Lombardi, two operas which employed the format of large choral tableaux and something which the librettist was prepared to re-use for the new opera. No clear reason for this change seems to have emerged, except that Gabriele Baldini speculates that, in returning to Solera, he was more comfortable working with a librettist who was more suited to "sketching epic sagas and historical-religious frescoes.

Solera's approach to the project was to emphasize an appeal to Italian, specifically Venetian, patriotism, while ignoring many of the elements of the play. These included reversing the order of key scenes and, in the case of the opening scene showing the foundation of Venice, totally inventing it. But the pace began to slow as, firstly, illness limited the composer's ability to do much work. Then came the second blow: Solera left the project altogether and followed his opera singer wife to Madrid where he became director of the Royal Theatre, leaving only the draft sketch of the third act.

=== Verdi returns to Piave ===
Librettist Francesco Maria Piave

As things turned out, Verdi returned to Piave for the completion of act 3 – with Solera's blessing. However, the relationship between composer and the new librettist worsened in a variety of ways, especially over the use of stage bands in the context of the composer claiming to think in terms of his work being a grand opera: "Aren't Guillaume Tell and Robert le Diable grand operas? Yet they don't contain a band." And the differences between Piave's version and what Solera (who received a copy of Piave's act 3) had originally conceived were so great as to cause a final rift between Verdi and his long-time collaborator; the composer's ideas of musical theatre had moved far ahead of his older colleague.

== Performance history ==
=== 19th century ===
Overall, the reception from the press on opening night was not as positive as that from the audience present. As Budden notes, "the Italian public had taken Attila to their hearts" and he adds that a line sung by the Roman general Ezio in a duet – "Avrai tu l'universo, resta l'Italia a me" (You can have the universe, but leave Italy for me) – brought forth spontaneous cheers".

After its world premiere in 1846 in Venice, the opera went on to be produced in all of the major Italian cities (plus Barcelona, Lisbon, and Trieste), a total of over 25 productions, including one in Palermo under the title of Gli Unni e I Romani in 1855. One production in Como is recorded to have taken place in 1875, after which the opera appears to have disappeared in Italy, at least.

Attila was first produced in London in 1848 by Benjamin Lumley who, as impresario at Her Majesty's Theatre, had successfully presented Verdi's I masnadieri there in 1847. In his 1864 autobiography he notes that "none perhaps of Verdi's works had kindled more enthusiasm in Italy or crowned the fortunate composer with more abundant laurels than Attila. The Attila premiere featured Sophie Cruvelli, Italo Gardoni, Velletti, and Cruzzoni. The opera was first given in New York City in 1850.

=== 20th century and beyond ===
In the 20th century, it was revived in concert performance during Venice Festival of 1951 with Caterina Mancini, Gino Penno, Giangiacomo Guelfi, and Italo Tajo, under the conductor Carlo Maria Giulini; and at Sadler's Wells in London in 1963 (with an English libretto), with Rae Woodland, Donald Smith, Harry Mossfield and Donald McIntyre, with Muir Mathieson conducting. There was a Rome revival a year later, then productions in Trieste in (1965), in Buenos Aires in (1966), in Berlin in (1971), and in 1972 Attila was performed at the Edinburgh Festival and in Florence.

On 21 December 1980, the Vienna State Opera presented a new production conducted by Giuseppe Sinopoli, and staged by Giulio Chazalettes. The cast included Nicolai Ghiaurov as Attila, Piero Cappuccilli as Ezio, Mara Zampieri as Odabella, and Piero Visconti as Foresto.

From 1981 onwards the role of Attila was taken up by the American bass, Samuel Ramey, who made his first appearances at the New York City Opera in March 1981 in the opera which had not been seen in the city for one hundred and thirty years. Throughout that decade Ramey "unquestionably rack[ed] up more performances in the role than any bass since its creator" in houses such as La Fenice and San Francisco, finally making an audio recording in 1989, under Riccardo Muti. A DVD also exists from a new production staged by La Scala in 1991, again with Ramey and Muti. In February 2000 a concert performance was given by the Opera Orchestra of New York, again featuring Ramey as Attila.

The Royal Opera House premiered it on 13 October 1990, with Ruggero Raimondi in the title role, Josephine Barstow as Odabella, Giorgio Zancanaro as Ezio, Dennis O'Neill as Foresto, with Edward Downes conducting.

San Francisco Opera presented Attila on 21 November 1991, with Samuel Ramey in the title role, Elizabeth Connell as Odabella, Vladimir Chernov and Luis Giron May alternating as Ezio, Antonio Ordonez as Foresto, with Gabriele Ferro conducting in a production by Lotfi Mansouri.

In 2007, it was included as part of the Sarasota Opera's Verdi Cycle. Attila received a concert performance on 8 September 2007 at the Concertgebouw in Amsterdam, with Ildar Abdrazakov, Hasmik Papian, Paolo Gavanelli, and Massimiliano Pisapia. Jaap van Zweden conducted; a recording and broadcast followed.

The Metropolitan Opera mounted its first production directed by Pierre Audi on 23 February 2010 conducted by Riccardo Muti, who was making his house debut. Ildar Abdrazakov sang the title role, with Violeta Urmana as Odabella, Ramón Vargas as Foresto, Giovanni Meoni as Ezio, and Samuel Ramey as Leone. Miuccia Prada and the architects Herzog & de Meuron collaborated on costumes and sets. It was presented in September 2011 as part of the Washington Concert Opera's 2011/12 season and was staged by San Francisco Opera in June 2012 in a co-production with La Scala; Ferruccio Furlanetto sang the title role in San Francisco, while Orlin Anastassov sang the role in Milan when the production was first presented there in 2011. The work was presented by Berliner Operngruppe in 2012 in Berlin conducted by Felix Krieger.

== Roles ==
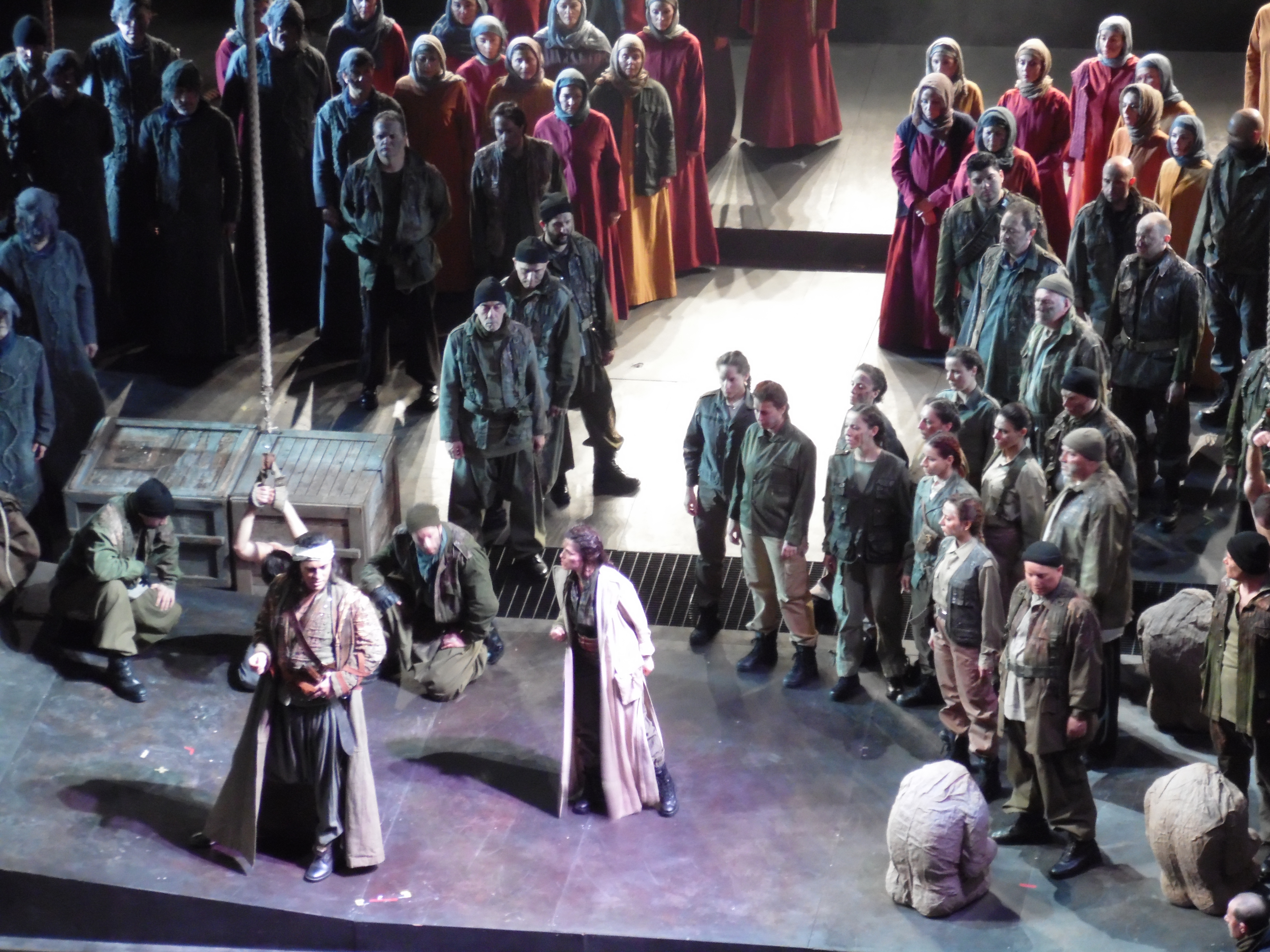
Verdi: Attila. Teatro Massimo, Palermo 2016

Roles, voice types, premiere cast
Role	Voice type	Premiere cast, 17 March 1846 Conductor: Gaetano Mares
Attila, King of the Huns	bass	Ignazio Marini
Uldino, a Breton slave of Attila's	tenor	Ettore Profili
Odabella, daughter of the Lord of Aquileia	soprano	Sophie Löwe
Ezio, a Roman General	baritone	Natale Costantini
Foresto, a Tribune of Aquileia	tenor	Carlo Guasco
Leone (Pope Leo I)	bass	Giuseppe Romanelli
Captains, Kings and Soldiers of the Huns, Priestesses, Aquileians, Roman Soldiers and populace of Rome

== Synopsis ==
Time: Mid-5th century (it was in 452 that the historical Attila destroyed the city of Aquileia)
Place: Aquileia, the Adriatic lagoons, and near Rome

=== Prologue ===
Scene 1: The ruined city of Aquileia

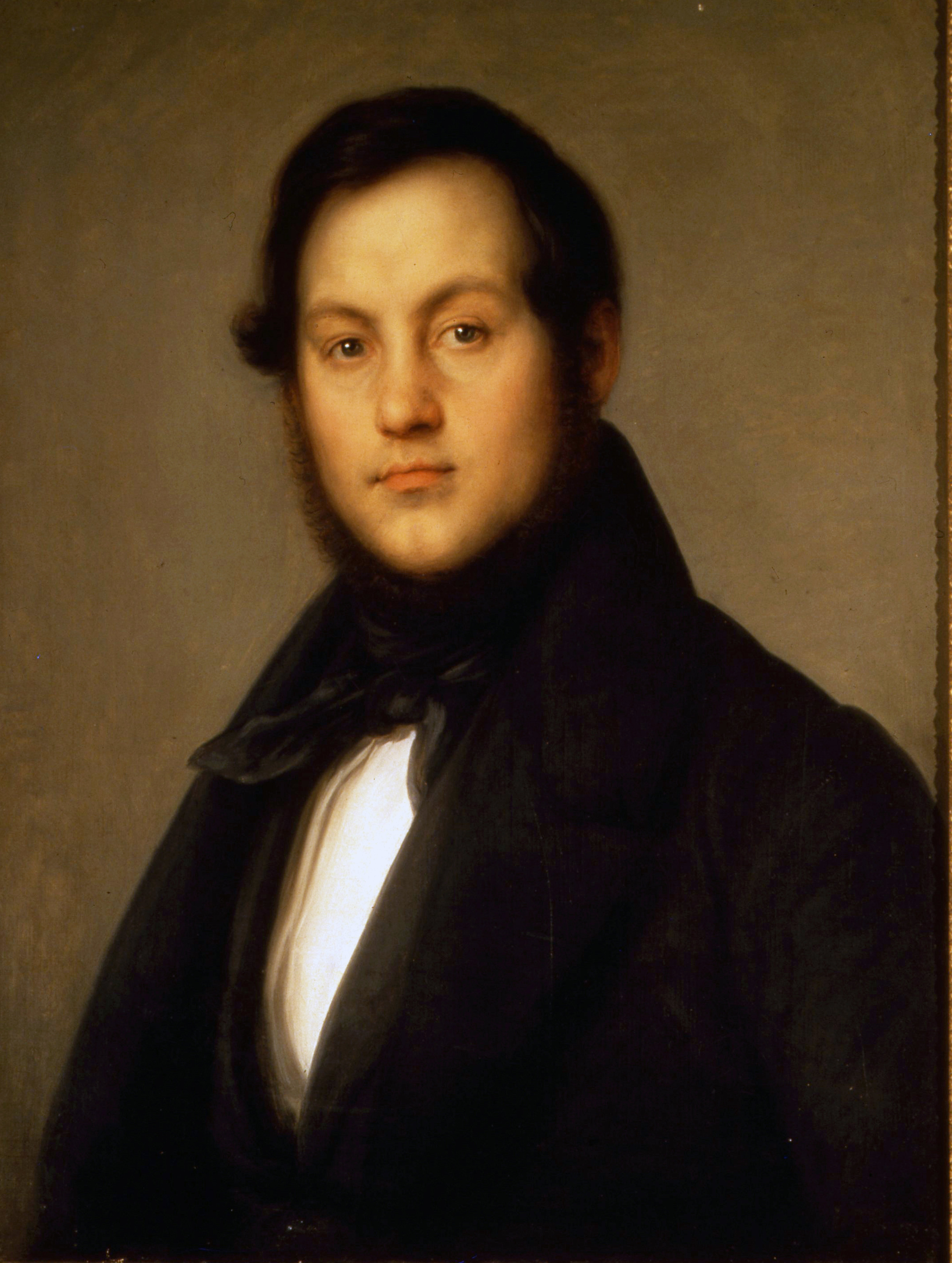
Bass Ignazio Marini sang Attila

Attila and his victorious horde have destroyed the city of Aquileia (Urli, rapine / "Shouts, pillage"). They are surprised to see a group of women spared as prisoners of war (Di vergini straniere / "Ah, what is this group"). Their leader, Odabella, asks why the Huns' women remain at home (Allor che i forti corrono / "While your warriors rush to their swords like lions"). Attila, impressed by her courage, offers a boon and she asks for her sword, with which she intends to avenge the death of her father at Attila's own hand (Da te questo or m'è concesso / "O sublime, divine justice by thee is this now granted"). After she leaves, the Roman envoy Ezio asks for an audience and proposes a division of the empire (Avrai tu l'universo, Resti l'Italia a me / "You may have the universe, but let Italy remain mine"). Attila disdainfully calls him a traitor to his country.

Scene 2: A swamp, the future site of Venice

A boat bearing Foresto and other survivors arrives. He thinks of the captive Odabella (Ella in poter del barbaro / "She is in the barbarian's power!") but then rouses himself and the others to begin building a new city (Cara patria già madre e reina / "Dear homeland, at once mother and queen of powerful, generous sons").

=== Act 1 ===
Scene 1: Some weeks later. A wood near Attila's camp, near Rome

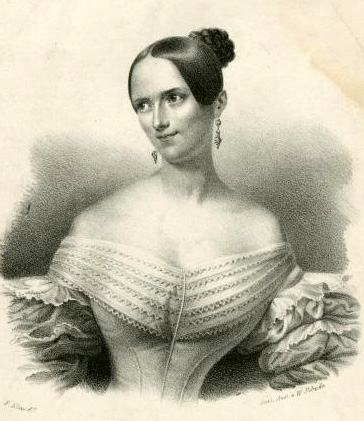
Soprano Sophie Löwe sang Odabella

Odabella laments her late father and (believing him to be dead) also her lover Foresto (Oh! Nel fuggente nuvolo / "O father, is your image not imprinted on the fleeting clouds?..."). When he appears, she is put on the defensive, denying any infidelity and reminding him of the biblical Judith. The couple is reunited: Oh, t'inebria nell'amplesso / "O vast joy without measure".

Scene 2: Attila's tent

Attila awakes and tells Uldino of a dream in which an old man stopped him at the gates of Rome and warned him to turn back (Mentre gonfiarsi l'anima parea / "As my soul seemed to swell"). In the daylight, his courage returns and he orders a march (Oltre a quel limite, t'attendo, o spettro / "Beyond that boundary I await you, O ghost!"). However, when a procession of maidens clad in white approaches, singing the Veni Creator Spiritus prayer (Vieni. Le menti visita / "Come, visit our minds"), he recognizes the Roman bishop Leo as the old man of his dream and collapses in terror.

=== Act 2 ===
Scene 1: Ezio's camp

Ezio has been recalled after a peace has been concluded. He contrasts Rome's past glory with the current child emperor Valentine (Dagl'immortali vertici / "From the splendid immortal peaks of former glory"). Recognizing the incognito Foresto among the bearers of an invitation to a banquet with Attila, he agrees to join forces with him (È gettata la mia sorte, son pronto ad ogni guerra / "My lot is cast, I am prepared for any warfare" ).

Scene 2: Attila's banquet

Foresto's plot to have Uldino poison Attila is foiled by Odabella, jealous of her own revenge. A grateful (and unsuspecting) Attila declares she shall be his wife, and places the unmasked Foresto in her custody.

=== Act 3 ===
The forest

Uldino informs Foresto about the plans for the wedding of Odabella and Attila; Foresto laments Odabella's apparent betrayal (Che non avrebbe il misero / "What would that wretched man not have offered for Odabella"). Ezio arrives with a plan to ambush the Huns; when Odabella comes Foresto accuses her of treachery, but she pleads for his trust (Te sol quest'anima / "Foresto, my soul belongs to you"). Attila finds the three together and realizes he has been betrayed. As Roman soldiers approach, Odabella stabs him with the sword he had given her. The three conspirators cry that the people have been avenged.

== Music ==
Modern day critical reactions to Verdi's music and musical choices vary somewhat, but there is general unanimity as to its principal weaknesses. For Gabriele Baldini, Attila is "one of the weakest scores of the 'galley years'" and he references the contemporary critical viewpoint of Luigi Casamorata who wrote in the Gazzetta Musicale di Milano of 17 January 1847 that, with this opera, Verdi had reached the "apogee of cabalettism". However, Baldini does point to the strengths of the score which include the prologue's music for dawn over the Adriatic, the music for the bass in his act 1 scene, and the baritone's act 2 aria as well as the final ensemble in act 3 "which possesses great powers of human communication".

Both Kimbell ("the sheer noisiness of Attila made it a bête noire of fastidious critics" and Budden ("...the heaviest and noisiest of the Risorgimento operas, blunt in style, daubed in thick garish colours") refer to some of least successful aspects of the work. However, Parker states something to which the others would appear to agree:

As with all of Verdi's early operas, there are impressive individual moments, particularly in those grand ensemble movements that constantly inspired the composer to redefine and hone his dramatic language.

Michael Oliver, in a recording review in Gramophone, called Attila a "strange, flawed but disquieting opera." Ralph Moore, in MusicwWeb International, wrote that Attila "strikes me as almost as melodic, dramatic and entertaining as its close cousins Ernani and Nabucco, especially when done well by four first-class soloists able to roll out Verdi’s grand melodies with fervour, starting with a great basso cantante but also a really good opera chorus." And Anthony Tommasini, reviewing the 2010 Metropolitan Opera premiere for The New York Times, wrote, "During every moment, 'Attila' came across as a vibrant and engrossing music drama."

== Recordings ==
Year	Cast: Attila, Foresto, Odabella, Ezio	Conductor, opera house and orchestra	Label
1951	Italo Tajo, Gino Penno, Caterina Mancini, Giangiacomo Guelfi	Carlo Maria Giulini, Coro e Orchestra della RAI Milano (radio broadcast)	CD: Great Opera Performances; Cat: G.O.P.66306
1962	Boris Christoff, Gastone Limarilli, Margherita Roberti, Giangiacomo Guelfi	Bruno Bartoletti, Maggio Musicale Fiorentino Orchestra and Chorus (Live recording of 1 December performance at the Teatro Communale)	CD: Opera D'Oro, Cat: OPD 1267
1970	Ruggero Raimondi, Gianfranco Cecchele, Antonietta Stella, Giangiacomo Guelfi	Riccardo Muti, RAI Symphony Orchestra and Chorus, Rome, Coro Voci Vianche "Renata Cortiglioni" (Live recording of 21 November performance in Rome)	CD: Opera D'Oro; Cat: OPD-1188
1972	Ruggero Raimondi, Carlo Bergonzi, Cristina Deutekom, Sherrill Milnes	Lamberto Gardelli, Royal Philharmonic Orchestra, Ambrosian Singers and Finchley Children's Music Group	CD: Philips; Cat: 412-875-2
1980	Nicolai Ghiaurov, Piero Visconti, Mara Zampieri, Piero Cappuccilli	Giuseppe Sinopoli, Vienna State Opera Orchestra and Chorus (Live recording of 28 December performance)	CD: Orfeo; Cat: C 601 032 I
1986	Yevgeny Nesterenko, János B. Nagy, Sylvia Sass, Lajos Miller	Lamberto Gardelli, Hungarian State Orchestra; Hungarian Radio and Television Chorus	CD: Hungaroton; Cat: HCD 12934-12935
1987	Samuel Ramey, Veriano Luchetti, Linda Roark Strummer, William Stone	Gabriele Ferro, Orchestra e Coro del Teatro La Fenice; Venice, January 23, 1987	CD: Gala; Cat: GL 100.779
1989	Samuel Ramey, Neil Shicoff, Cheryl Studer, Giorgio Zancanaro	Riccardo Muti, Teatro alla Scala Orchestra and Chorus	CD: EMI; Cat: CDS 7 49952-2
1991	Samuel Ramey, Kaludi Kaludov, Cheryl Studer, Giorgio Zancanaro	Riccardo Muti, Teatro alla Scala Orchestra and Chorus	DVD: Image Entertainment; Cat: 4360PUDVD
2001	Ferruccio Furlanetto, Carlo Ventre, Dimitra Theodossiou, Alberto Gazale	Donato Renzetti, Teatro Lirico Giuseppe Verdi, Trieste Orchestra and Chorus	CD: Dynamic; Cat: CDS 372/1-2
2010	Giovanni Battista Parodi, Roberto de Biasio, Susanna Branchini, Sebastian Catana	Andrea Battistoni, Teatro Regio di Parma	DVD: C Major; Cat:721608
2020	Ildebrando D'Arcangelo, Stefano La Colla, Liudmyla Monastyrska, George Petean	Ivan Repusic, Chor des Bayerischen Rundfunks, Munchner Rundfunkorchester	CD:BR-Klassik; Cat:900330
