= Prestia =

Prestia is an Italian surname. Notable people with the surname include:

- Charles J. Prestia (1909–1953), American politician
- Dion Prestia (born 1992), Australian rules footballer
- Giacomo Prestia (born 1960), Italian opera singer
- Giuseppe Prestia (born 1993), Italian footballer
- Jo Prestia (born 1960), French actor
- Rocco Prestia (1951–2020), American bassist
- Shirley Prestia (1947–2011), American actress
