= Antonio Selva =

Italian operatic bass

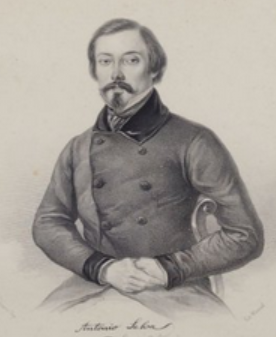
Antonio Selva - operatic bass

Antonio Selva (1824 - September 1889) was an Italian operatic bass who had an active international career from the 1840s through the 1870s. He was particularly associated with the works of Giuseppe Verdi.

== Life and career ==
Antonio Selva was born in Padua in 1824. His birth name was Antonio Scremin, and he was the brother of actor Giambattista Scremin. He originally trained to be an organ builder under Angelo Agostini. Angelo's father, the voice teacher Lorenzo Agostini, discovered his beautiful natural singing voice and began training him for an opera career. He made his professional opera debut in 1842 in one of the smaller theatre's in his home town as Zaccaria in Giuseppe Verdi's Nabucco. He was also active as a member of the opera chorus at La Fenice while a teenager.

At the age of 19, he was chosen by Verdi to portray what was written as the comprimario role of de Silva in the world premiere of the composer's Ernani at La Fenice on 9 March 1844; he was a last minute replacement for a singer who found the role too low for his voice and with whom Verdi had little confidence. He was later to expand the role by providing a cabaletta for the character.

Selva was soon invited to sign significant roles at leading opera houses throughout Italy. He made appearances at La Scala, the Teatro Comunale di Bologna, the Teatro di San Carlo in Naples, the Teatro San Samuele in Venice, and the Teatro Valle in Rome among others. In 1849 he created the role of Count Walter in the world premiere of Verdi's Luisa Miller in Naples. He also sang at the Théâtre Italien in Paris from 1865 to 1867 and was a heard at the Teatro Real in Madrid in 1852-1853 and between 1864 and 1874. Some of the roles in his stage repertoire were Balthazar in Gaetano Donizetti's La favorite, Banquo and many of the comprimario roles in Verdi's Macbeth, Briano in Verdi's Aroldo, Moser in Verdi's I masnadieri, and the title role in Verdi's Attila.

After retiring from the stage in the mid-1870s, Selva worked as a singing teacher in his native city. He died in Padua in 1889 at the age of 65.
