= Kastorsky =

Kastorsky (masculine), Kastorskaya (feminine) is a Russian surname. Notable people with the surname include:

- Mikhail Kastorsky (1809–1866), Russian philologist, historian, ethnographer, and censor
- Sergey Kastorsky (1948–2016), Soviet and Russian composer
- Vladimir Kastorsky (1870–1948), Russian and Soviet opera singer

== Fictional ==
- Buba Kastorsky, "original coupletist hailing from Odesa", fictional character in "Red Western" films about The Elusive Avengers
