= Ernani (1903 La voce del padrone recording) =

Recording of Verdi's Ernani in 1903

The recording of Verdi's Ernani in 1903 by La voce del padrone was the first complete opera recording. It was issued on 40 single-sided discs. The first complete orchestral recording, Arthur Nikisch's recording of Beethoven's Fifth Symphony, was made in 1913.
