= Giacomo Prestia =

Italian opera singer

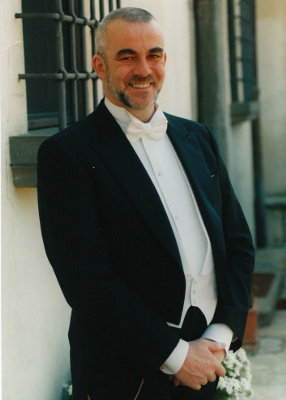
Giacomo Prestia

Giacomo Prestia (born August 22, 1960 in Florence) is an Italian operatic bass,

A native of Florence (Italy), Giacomo Prestia studied vocal technique with Maestro Sergio Catoni. He won international competitions including the "Concorso internazionale Voci Verdiane" in Busseto and the "Concorso Luciano Pavarotti" in Philadelphia.

He made his opera debut with Giuseppe Verdi's Alzira in Fidenza in 1990. He performs in Teatro alla Scala, Maggio Musicale Fiorentino, Opéra National de Paris, Wiener Staatsoper, Opernhaus Zurich, Teatro Real de Madrid, Liceu de Barcelona, Staatsoper Unter den Linden and Deutsche Oper Berlin, Teatro Colón de Buenos Aires, Teatro Comunale in Bologna, San Carlo in Naples, Berlin Philharmonic, Teatro Regio di Parma. He has worked with Claudio Abbado, Zubin Mehta, Riccardo Muti, Georges Prêtre, Daniele Gatti, Nicola Luisotti.

== Repertory ==
- Beethoven
  - Missa solemnis
- Vincenzo Bellini
  - I puritani
  - La sonnambula
- Gaetano Donizetti
  - La favorita
  - Don Pasquale
  - Messa da requiem
- Gounod
  - Faust
- Massenet
  - Don Quichotte
- Meyerbeer
  - Gli ugonotti
- Amilcare Ponchielli
  - La Gioconda
- Gioachino Rossini
  - Il barbiere di Siviglia
  - Stabat Mater
- Giuseppe Verdi
  - Aida
  - Attila
  - Don Carlos
  - Ernani
  - La forza del destino
  - I Lombardi alla prima crociata
  - Macbeth
  - I masnadieri
  - Messa da Requiem
  - Simon Boccanegra
  - I vespri siciliani
