= Ilva Ligabue =

Italian operatic soprano (1932–1998)

- Ilva Ligabue (photo with dedication)
- Born: May 23, 1932; Reggio Emilia, Italy
- Died: August 19, 1998 (aged 66); Palermo, Italy
- Occupation: Opera singer
- Spouse: Paolo Pedani

Ilva Ligabue (photo with dedication)

Ilva Ligabue (May 23, 1932 – August 19, 1998) was an Italian operatic soprano, best known for the role of Alice Ford in Falstaff, which she recorded twice, under Georg Solti (RCA, 1963) and Leonard Bernstein (Sony, 1966).

Ilva Ligabue was born at Reggio Emilia. She studied at the Milan Conservatory in the class of Campogalliani and at La Scuola di Canto alla Scala where she made her debut as Marina in 1953. After singing with success at most of the Italian opera houses, she won considerable acclaim in the title role of Beatrice di Tenda at La Scala in 1961, followed by Margherita in Boito's Mefistofele in Chicago.

She then began appearing abroad, notably in Germany, also singing at the Vienna State Opera, the Paris Opera, and became a regular guest artist at the Glyndebourne Festival and the Aix-en-Provence Festival, where she was especially admired as Fiordiligi in Cosi fan tutte. She also appeared in Buenos Aires, Chicago and New York City.

A sensitive and intelligent singer and a fine actress, other notable roles included Amelia in Un ballo in maschera and Desdemona in Otello. Alan Blyth wrote that "those who saw and heard her will always remember the liveliness of her characterizations and the aplomb of her singing", representing an Italian vocal style "outgoing yet disciplined".

Her complete opera recordings include Alice in Falstaff conducted by Downes, Solti and Bernstein, Verdi's Messa da Requiem on CD and DVD under Carlo Maria Giulini, as well as live recordings including Verdi's Otello in Dallas in 1962 with Del Monaco and Vinay (singing Iago);I masnadieri in Rome in 1972 with Raimondi, Bruson and Christoff; and La Forza del Destino at La Scala in 1965 with Bergonzi, Ghiaurov, and Simionato.

Ligabue was married to the Italian baritone Paolo Pedani. She died in Palermo.
