= Stefano La Colla =

Italian tenor

- Born: Turin, Italy
- Genres: opera
- Occupation: Singer
- Instrument: Vocals
- Years active: 2008–present
- Website: https://www.stefanolacolla.com/

Stefano La Colla is an Italian tenor who has given recitals and performed in opera internationally.

== Biography ==
La Colla was born in Turin, but lived in Alcamo between the ages of 12 and 23. He started his studies at the Conservatorio Pietro Mascagni in Livorno and trained under the guide of the soprano Luciana Serra and later with the baritone Carlo Meliciani.

In 2002 he won a scholarship at the Accademia d’alto Perfezionamento del Repertorio Pucciniano of Torre del Lago, where he attended its courses with Magda Olivero, Katia Ricciarelli and Raina Kabaivanska. Afterwards he performed with Katia Ricciarelli at the Teatro Verdi of Pisa in a gala event organized by the Rotary Club.

He debuted in July 2006 in Madama Butterfly in the role of Pinkerton during the summer festival of Fontanellato (Parma), and replicated in October in Reggio Emilia. In the following November he debuted in Nabucco, in the role of Ismaele in Mantua. In July 2007 he had his debut in Aida, as Radames, at the festival Openair in Narni (TR) and during the summer, he held concerts for the Associazione Medici Giuluni for the review of “Musica nelle Ville Versiliesi”, at Forte dei Marmi (LU). He also took part in the recording of Bianca and Fernando by RAI at the Teatro Massimo Bellini in Catania under the direction of Maestro Carella.

In December 2007 he gave a concert at Museo Poldi Pezzoli of Milan for six harps and solo voice. In 2008 he gave concerts in Europe and in Japan with Fondazione Arena di Verona. On 10 November 2008, at the Auditorium Parco della Musica in Rome, he gave a concert together with Luciana Serra. He replicated Aida on 8 December at Teatro Goldoni (Livorno).

After that he continued his artistic experience in the traditional theatres of Italian cities such as Novara, Savona, Chieti, Reggio Emilia, Pisa, Lucca, Livorno, Busseto and Brescia.

His international career started in 2011 with Turandot in Ratisbon (where he made his debut with 16 recitals), then in Dortmund, Leipzig, Saint Petersburg, St. Gallen, Zagabria, and Bucarest. In 2014 he performed in some of the great European opera houses in Hamburg, Berlin, Munich, Amsterdam, Oslo, Dresden and Vienna. In Italy he performed in Rome, Naples and Verona, and several times at Teatro alla Scala in Milan, where in 2015 he had a prestigious debut as Calaf in Turandot (opening event of La Scala for EXPO), under the direction of Riccardo Chailly. After this great success, he was invited again for the following production, Cavalleria Rusticana (as Turiddu).

== Awards ==
- 2002: winner of a scholarship at the Accademia d’Alto Perfezionamento del Repertorio Pucciniano di Torre del Lago
- 2006: winner of the International Contest Ismaele Voltolini at Buscoldo (Mantua)
- 18 February 2024: Prize as ‘Best Personality of the Year' for 2023, assigned by the Kiwanis Club of Alcamo.
- 18 February 2024: Prize ‘Ciullo d'Alcamo’ 2024 assigned by the Associazione Amici della Musica of Alcamo.

== Performances ==
2014

- Manon Lescaut (Renato Des Grieux) Oper Leipzig (February–May)
- La Gioconda (Enzo Grimaldi) Theater St. Gallen (February–May)
- Tosca (Cavaradossi) Deutsche Oper Berlin (May)
- Macbeth (Macduff) Opera Wrocławska (June)
- Un ballo in maschera (Riccardo) Theater Dortmund (Sept.-Oct.)
- Manon Lescaut (Il Cavaliere des Grieux) at the Mikhailovsky Theatre of Saint Petersburg (October 2014 – April 2015)

2015

- Manon Lescaut (Il Cavaliere des Grieux) Oper Leipzig (Jan.–Apr.)
- Turandot (Calaf) Teatro di San Carlo, Naples (March–April)
- Tosca (Cavaradossi) Teatro dell'Opera di Roma (March–June)
- Turandot (Calaf) Teatro alla Scala, Milan (May)
- Cavalleria rusticana (Turiddu) Teatro alla Scala, Milan (June)
- Nabucco (Ismaele) Deutsche Oper Berlin (June)
- Tosca (Cavaradossi) Teatro di San Carlo]], Naples (July)
- Turandot (Calaf) Teatro dell'Opera di Roma of Rome (July–August)
- Turandot (Calaf) Deutsche Oper Berlin (Sept.-Nov.)
- Manon Lescaut (Il Cavaliere des Grieux) Deutsche Oper Berlin (November 2015 – March 2016)
- Tosca (Cavaradossi) Teatro dell'Opera of Rome (December)

2016

- Tosca (Cavaradossi) Theater St. Gallen. (January–May)
- Concert (Tenore) Deutsche Oper am Rhein, Düsseldorf (March)
- Tosca (Cavaradossi) Toulon Opera (April)
- Madama Butterfly (F B Pinkerton) Staatsoper Unter den Linden, Berlin (April–May)
- Le Cid (Rodrigue), Theater St Gallen (June–July)
- Aida (Radamès), Fondazione Arena di Verona (June–August)
- Aida (Radamès), Teatro di San Carlo, Naples (July–August)
- Turandot (Calaf) Wiener Staatsoper, (September 2016 – March 2017)
- Manon Lescaut (des Grieux) De Nationale Opera, Amsterdam (October)
- Turandot (the unknown prince), Bayerische Staatsoper of Munich (December)

2017

- Il trovatore, Teatro Calderón, Valladolid, (February)
- Tosca (Cavaradossi), Festspielhaus Baden-Baden, (April)
- Tosca (Cavaradossi), Berlin Philharmonie, (April)
- Cavalleria rusticana (Turiddu), Opéra national du Rhin, Strasburg (June)
- Pagliacci (Canio), Opéra National du Rhin, Strasburg (June)
- Turandot (Calaf), Festival Puccini 2017 of Torre del Lago (July)
- Aida (Radamès), Macerata Opera Festival (July–August)
- Nabucco (Ismaele), Teatro alla Scala, Milan (Oct.–Nov.)

2018

- Tosca, Oper Frankfurt, Première 22 September, 27 September, 5, 13, 18 and 20 October
- Il trovatore, Staatsoper in Berlin, Première 27 October, 31 October, 3 and 8 November
- Tosca Teatro dell'Opera, Rome Première 15 November, 17 November
- Aida, Irish National Opera House of Dublin 27 and 29 November
- La Forza del Destino (Don Alvaro), Oper Koeln, Première 23 December, 28 and 30 December

2019

- La Forza del Destino (Don Alvaro), Cologne Opera, 4 and 11 January
- La Gioconda di Ponchielli, La Monnaie in Bruxelles, Premiére 29 and 30 January, 1, 5, 8 e 12 febbraio
- Turandot, Deutsche Oper Berlin, 22 febbraio and 8 March
- Tosca, Teatro Municipale, Piacenza Première 15 March, 17 March
- La Gioconda, Liceu di Barcellona, 2, 5, 8, 11 and 14 April
- Tosca, Bavarian State Opera, Première 4 May, 7 and 10 May
- Un ballo in maschera, Hessisches Staatstheater Wiesbaden, Première 16 May
- Turandot Deutsche Oper Berlin, 18 and 23 May
- Norma di Bellini, Oper Frankfurt, Première 7 June, 17, 20, 23 and 28 June
- Tosca, Teatro dell'Opera di Roma, 18, 21 e 26 June
- Turandot, Munich Opera Festival (Munchner Opernfestspiele di Monaco), Première 13 July, 16 July
- Andrea Chenier, Munich Opera Festival (Munchner Opernfestspiele di Monaco), Première 21 July, 25 July
- Madame Butterfly, La Fenice in Venice, Première 31 August, 4, 8, 10, 15, 21 and 25 September, 3 e 5 October
- Attila di Verdi, Prinzregentheater di Monaco di Baviera, Première 13 October
- Tosca di Puccini, Bavarian State Opera of Munich, 28 and 31 October, 3 November
- Pagliacci, Teatro Comunale di Bologna,15 Première 15 dicembre, 18, 20, 22 December

2020

- Turandot (Calaf), Palm Beach Opera House, Première 24 January, 26 January
- Pagliacci (Canio), Teatro Municipale (Reggio Emilia), Première 7 and 9 February
- Madama Butterfly (Pinkerton), Staatsoper, 15-19 and 22 February
- Madama Butterfly (Pinkerton), Wiener Staatsoper, 2 March
- Il piccolo Marat di Mascagni, Concertgebouw, Amsterdam, Première 5 September
- Tosca (Mario Cavaradossi), Bayerische Staatsoper of Munich, Première 7 October, 10 and 13 October
- Manon Lescaut (De Grieux), Teatro Massimo of Palermo, 23 October.

2021

- Aida (Radames) Art Center of Melbourne; Première 6 May, 8-10-12-15-17-19-21 May
- Norma (Pollione), OPER FRANKFURT, Première 12 September, 18-22-25 September, 3 October, 16-20-26 December
- La Forza del Destino (Don Alvaro), Bayerische Staatsoper of Munich, Première 26 September, 29 September and 2 October
- Norma (Pollione), Teatro municipale of Piacenza, Première 22 October, 24 October
- Norma (Pollione), Teatro comunale "Luciano Pavarotti" of Modena, Première 29 October, 31 October
- Aida (Radames), Teatro Regio of Turin, Première 26 November, 28 November.

2022

- Aida (Radames), Deutsche Oper Berlin, Première 22 January, 29 January and 4 February
- Aida (Radames), Teatro di San Carlo in Naples, 17 - 20 - 21 - 23–26 February
- Aida (Radames), Semperoper in Dresden 17–20 March
- Tosca di G.Puccini (Mario Cavaradossi), Semperoper in Dresden 25–27 March
- Aida (Radames), Hamburg State Opera, 3 April
- Turandot di Puccini (Calaf), Bunka Kaikan di Tokyo, Première 15 April, 17 April (Spring Opera Festival)
- Il Trovatore (Manrico) Teatro Principal de Mao di Minorca, Première 27 May, 29 May
- La Gioconda (Enzo Grimaldo) New Production,Teatro alla Scala di Milano, Première 7 June, 11, 14, 18, 21, 25 June
- Il Tabarro di Puccini (Luigi), Oper Frankfurt, Première 8 July, 11 - 14 - 17–20 July
- La Gioconda (Enzo Grimaldo) Chorégies d'Orange, 6 August
- Il Trovatore (Manrico), Opernhaus Zürich, Première 17, 24, 27 September, 6, 11, 16 October
- Turandot di Puccini (Calaf), Oper Kolne, Première 29 ottobre, 3, 6, 9, 13 November
- Tosca di G.Puccini (Mario Cavaradossi), Vienna State Opera, Première 23 November, 2 and 5 December

2023

- Aida (Radames), Teatro Filarmonico (Verona), Première 12 February
- Aida (Radames), Teatro Regio (Turin), Première 25 e 28 Febbraio, 2-4-7-8 March
- Tosca di G. Puccini(Mario Cavaradossi), Canadian Opera Company di Toronto, Première 5 May, 7-11-13-19-21-23-27 May
- Turandot di Puccini (Calaf), Deutsche Oper Berlin, 23-26-29 June

2024

- Il Tabarro di Puccini (Luigi), Hamburg State Opera, Première 21 January, 26 e 30 January, 1 February
- Madame Butterfly (Pinkerton), Hamburg State Opera, 24 and 27 January, 4 February
- Madame Butterfly (Pinkerton), Royal Danish Playhouse, Première 5 March, 8 and 21 March, 2, 12, 16, 30 April and 5 May (Aalborg)
- Turandot di Puccini (Calaf), La Monnaie/De Munt, Première 14 June, 18, 21, 25, 27 and 30 June
- Edgar di Puccini (Edgar), Opéra de Nice, Première 8 November, 10 and 12 November
- Aida (Radames), Oper Frankfurt, Première 22 e 24 November, 8-15 and 20 December
- Carmen di Bizet (Don Josè), Hessisches Staatstheater Wiesbaden, Première 14 December, 19-22 and 28 December
- Gala Concert at the Opera House of Bonn, 31 December

== Sources ==
- "Stefano La Colla tenore alcamese".
- "Stefano La Colla". Montecatini Opera Festival.
- "Stefano La Colla". IMDb.
