= Giulio Chazalettes =

Italian opera director and former actor

Giulio Chazalettes (born 1930) is an Italian opera director and former actor.

== Biography ==
He was born in Verona or Turin. He was taught in music by his mother, a German pianist. After having settled in Milan, he was accepted by the Piccolo Teatro's acting school. Soon he also joined the company, and appeared in Sacrilegio massimo by Stefano Landi, and replaced Giorgio De Lullo in The Madwoman of Chaillot. Later he went to Dresden to work as an actor and assistant director. Returning to Italy, he finished his musical education at the Florence conservatory. Chazalettes then started his career as an opera director. In 1976, he debuted at La Scala with Massenet's Werther (conducted by Georges Prêtre). His debut at the Vienna State Opera came in 1980 with Verdi's Attila (conducted by Giuseppe Sinopoli). Chazalettes also worked for the Chicago Lyric Opera and the Bavarian State Opera. In 1989, he directed Frederica von Stade in Massenet's Cherubin for the Santa Fe Opera, about which the New York Times wrote: "Giulio Chazalettes's staging adopts a broadly comical, burlesque-opera approach that emphasizes Cherubin's lack of discrimination in woman-chasing. The countess (Melanie Helton) and the baroness (Judith Christin) fluttered about as painted gargoyles, their grotesqueness contrasting sharply with the beauty of the boy's other loves, the dancer L'Ensoleillad (Karen Huffstodt) and the peasant girl Nina (Sheryl Woods). Subtler production styles could be imagined, certainly, but this one often tickled the work hilariously into life."
