= I masnadieri =

Opera by Giuseppe Verdi

- Opera by Giuseppe Verdi
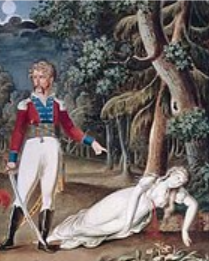
- Death of Amalia in act 5 of Schiller's play, Die Räuber
- Librettist: Andrea Maffei
- Language: Italian
- Based on: Friedrich von Schiller's Die Räuber
- Premiere: 22 July 1847; Her Majesty's Theatre, London

I masnadieri (The Bandits or The Robbers) is an opera in four acts by Giuseppe Verdi to an Italian libretto by Andrea Maffei, based on the play Die Räuber by Friedrich von Schiller. As Verdi became more successful in Italy, he began to receive offers from other opera houses outside the country. The London impresario Benjamin Lumley had presented Ernani in 1845 and, as a result of its success, commissioned an opera from the composer which became I masnadieri. It was given its first performance at Her Majesty's Theatre on 22 July 1847 with Verdi conducting the first two performances.

While reasonably successful there and in Italy up to the mid-1860s, the opera disappeared for about ninety years until revived in 1951. It has been staged and filmed several times in the 21st century.

== Composition history ==
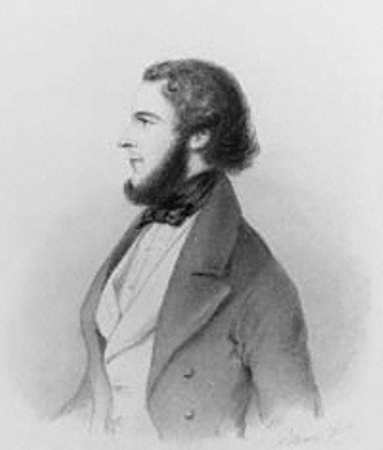
London impresario Benjamin Lumley

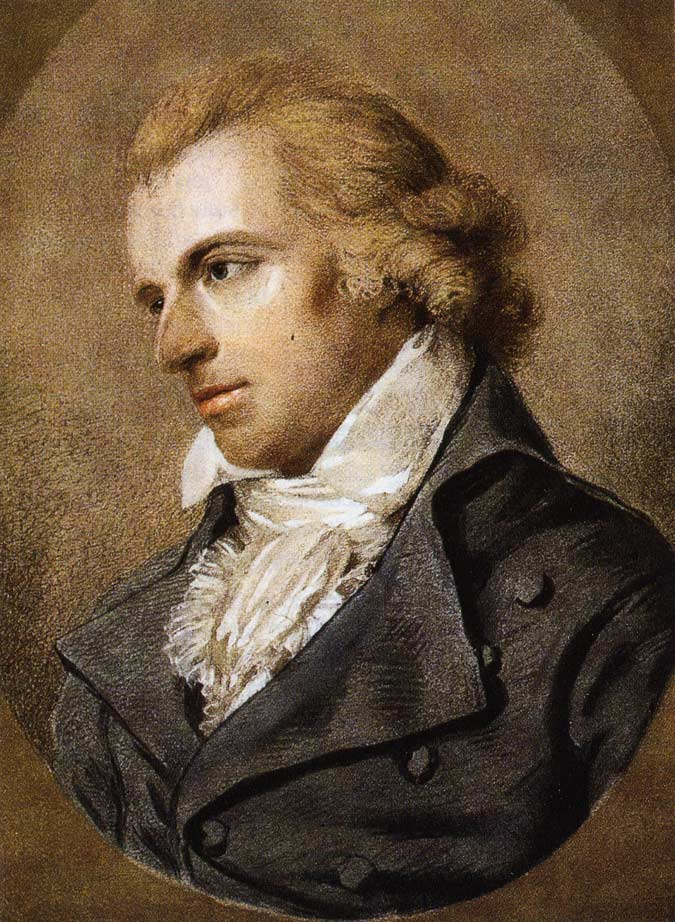
Friedrich Schiller

In 1842 Lumley took over the management of Her Majesty's Theatre, the traditional home of Italian opera in London. Three years later Verdi's Ernani received its first British production at his theatre to great public acclaim, which convinced Lumley that he should commission an opera from Verdi, who was by then emerging as Italy's leading composer. Initially, the opera was to be Il corsaro based on the Byron poem of 1814, The Corsair. Verdi accepted Lumley's proposal and production was scheduled for the world premiere of the new opera in the summer of 1846. Unfortunately, Verdi's health deteriorated and the premiere of the new work had to be postponed until 1847.

During his period of recovery, one of Verdi's close friends, Andrea Maffei, a distinguished poet who had translated both Shakespeare and Schiller into Italian, suggested that Macbeth and Schiller's Die Räuber might provide suitable operatic subjects. With an offer to present a new opera in Florence, Verdi had the choice of two locations, Florence or London. In the end, the decision to present the opera Macbeth in Florence came about because of the availability of a suitable baritone, which Florence produced in the form of Felice Varesi. Thus, I masnadieri became destined for London, but with the condition that both Jenny Lind and the tenor Fraschini would be available. Maffei himself worked to complete the libretto of the Schiller opera with the composer. However, while Verdi had specified Fraschini, Budden notes that the management were not able to guarantee his presence and, besides, Muzio's "ear to the ground for news of the London opera season" had discovered that the preferred tenor there was Italo Gardoni, who did sing the premiere.

Verdi left Italy at the end of May 1847, accompanied by his long-time assistant and student Emanuele Muzio, with his work for London completed, except for the orchestration, which he left until the opera was in rehearsal. Apart from this being somewhat standard practice, another reason is noted by Gabiele Baldini in The Story of Giuseppe Verdi: the composer wanted to hear "la Lind and modify her role to suit her more exactly."

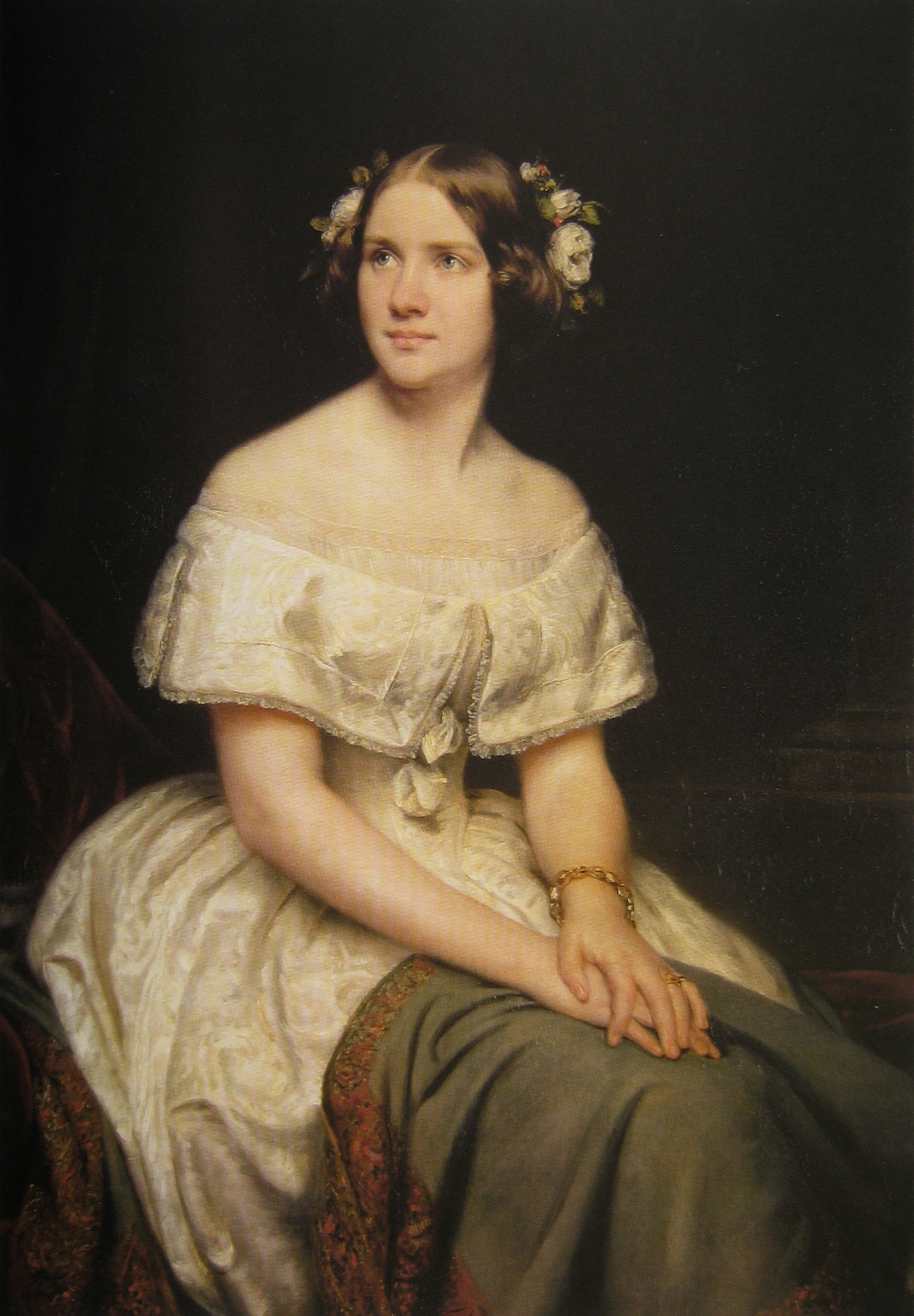
Soprano Jenny Lind (by Eduard Magnus, 1862)

However, there had already been rumblings that Lind may not be present; in a letter to Lumley in April, the composer had warned the impresario that he "would not put up with the slightest shortcoming" and that he would withdraw the opera "if my opera is not put on at the proper time and with everything done as it ought to be done" An additional issue emerged. The travelers having reached Paris, Verdi heard rumours that Lind was not willing to learn new roles and, therefore, Muzio was sent across the English Channel ahead of the composer, who waited for an assurance that the soprano was in London and willing to proceed. From London, Muzio was able to give Verdi that assurance, informing him that Lind was ready and eager to go to work. Verdi continued his journey, crossing the Channel on 5 June.

Lumley had assembled a cast of the highest international standard, specifically the Swedish coloratura soprano Jenny Lind, who came to create the role of Amalia, the opera's heroine. Thus, this opera became the highlight of her first season in England. After considerable persuasion Verdi agreed to conduct the premiere on 22 July 1847 and also conducted the second performance and after Verdi's departure, it was given two more times before the end of the season. Queen Victoria and Prince Albert attended the first performance, together with the Duke of Wellington and every member of the British aristocracy and fashionable society who was able to gain admission.

Overall, the premiere was a triumphant success for the composer himself, and the press was for the most part generous in its praise, although the critic Henry Chorley was to describe it as "the worst opera that has been given in our time at Her Majesty's Theatre. Verdi is finally rejected".

=== The libretto ===
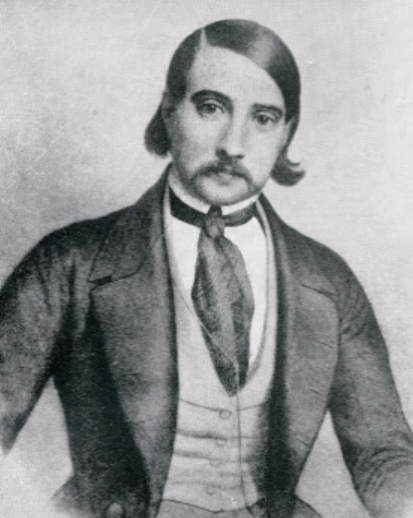
Angelo Mariani

As Gabriele Baldini in The Story of Giuseppe Verdi examines this opera, the quality of the libretto preoccupies him over several pages, as much for the unsuitability of Maffei as a librettist as his lack of skill in crafting Schiller's story into an acceptable libretto. He stresses the fact that Maffei's strengths lay in the field of translation, mostly from the German and English literature, and Baldini sums him up as "neither a poet nor a good man of letters ... who found himself at the centre of cultural currents to which he was contributing nothing really vital". Implicit, therefore, is the notion - as noted in the quotation from Basevi below under "Music" - of whether composer and librettist were really suited to each other. Musicologist Julian Budden, who describes Maffei's libretto as "indigestible", agrees with this assessment when he states that, along with Salvadore Cammarano, the librettist employed by the composer for the first time in 1845 to write Alzira, there was "an exaggerated regard on Verdi's part for the librettist" and he continues: "such complaisance [from the composer] was a bad sign."

== Performance history ==
=== 19th century ===
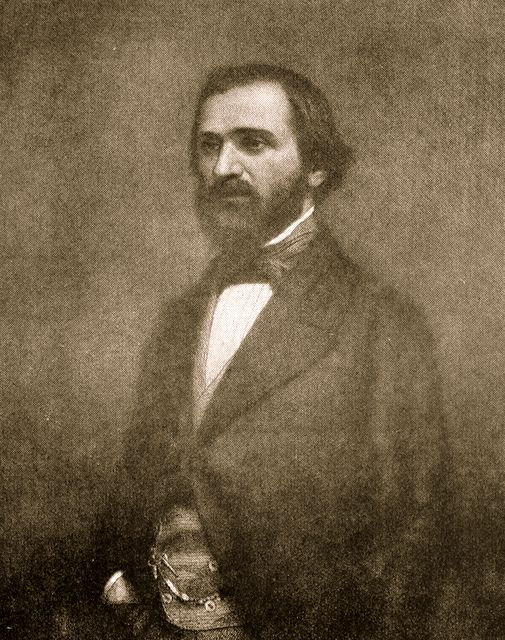
Giuseppe Verdi

While never entirely successful elsewhere, perhaps (at least in part) for the inconsistencies and excesses of its libretto, following its premiere performances, stagings in Italy were quite numerous until 1862, with performances having been given in about 17 Italian cities, including three in Milan (two of which were at La Scala) between 1849 and 1862. Budden notes that the opera did not do well on the continent, although it was translated into French, Hungarian and German and given in Russia under the title Adele di Cosenza "before it joined Alzira in the limbo of Verdi's least performed operas".

=== 20th century ===
From the 1970s on, the work has begun to reappear in the repertoire. A staged production in 1972 at the Rome Opera was recorded that November, with some outstanding singers of the era who included Boris Christoff, Gianni Raimondi, Renato Bruson and Ilva Ligabue. In New York, a concert performance was given by the Opera Orchestra of New York in February 1975. Other 1970s examples include a September 1976 performance in the Coliseo Albia in Bilbao, with Matteo Manuguerra and Cristina Deutekom appearing in major roles. La Scala in Milan presented the opera in 1978 under Riccardo Chailly.

In Australia in June/July 1980 at the Sydney Opera House Richard Bonynge conducted performances - which featured Joan Sutherland as Amalia. Nello Santi conducted a 1982 Zurich Opera production with Giorgio Zancanaro and Cristina Deutekom. In the US, the San Diego Opera staged it during their "Verdi Festival" in summer 1984 and brought in both Joan Sutherland and her husband.

=== 21st century ===
There was a staging in Palermo in 2001 with Dimitra Theodossiou, Roberto Servile, and Carlo Ventre. The next year the Royal Opera Covent Garden presented a new production featuring Delligatti, René Pape, Franco Farina and Dmitri Hvorostovsky. I masnadieri is naturally programmed by companies presenting every one of Verdi's operas: it appeared in Bilbao as part of the ABAO company's 2003/2004 "Tutto Verdi" series, at the Sarasota Opera in 2006 in its "Verdi Cycle" series, and at Teatro Regio di Parma in its 2013 "Festival Verdi". The work has in recent years also been in the repertory of Zurich Opera, Frankfurt Opera, Teatro Colón in Buenos Aires, Teatro di San Carlo in Naples and Bavarian State Opera in Munich. The latter three stagings were filmed in 2008, 2012 and 2020, respectively, and have been issued as DVDs or streamed online. I masnadieri was revived in Munich in 2023.

== Roles ==
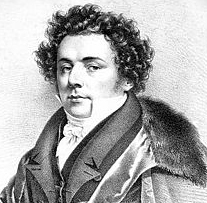
Luigi Lablache sang Count Moor

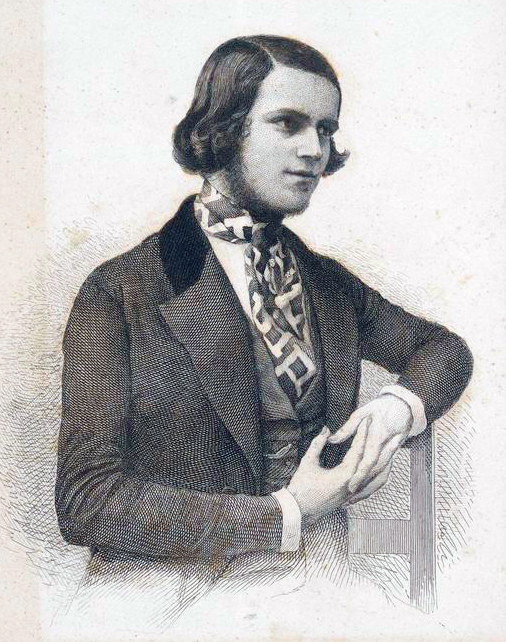
Italo Gardoni sang Carlo

Role	Voice type	Premiere Cast, 22 July 1847 (Conductor: Giuseppe Verdi)
Massimiliano, Count Moor	bass	Luigi Lablache
Carlo, elder son of Massimiliano	tenor	Italo Gardoni
Francesco, younger son of Massimiliano	baritone	Filippo Coletti
Amalia, orphaned niece of Massimiliano	soprano	Jenny Lind
Arminio, servant to the Count	tenor	Leone Corelli
Rolla, senior member of the band of robbers	baritone	Dal-Fiori
Moser, a priest	bass	Lucien Bouché
Chorus of robbers

== Synopsis ==
Place: Germany
Time: between 1755 and 1757.

=== Act 1 ===
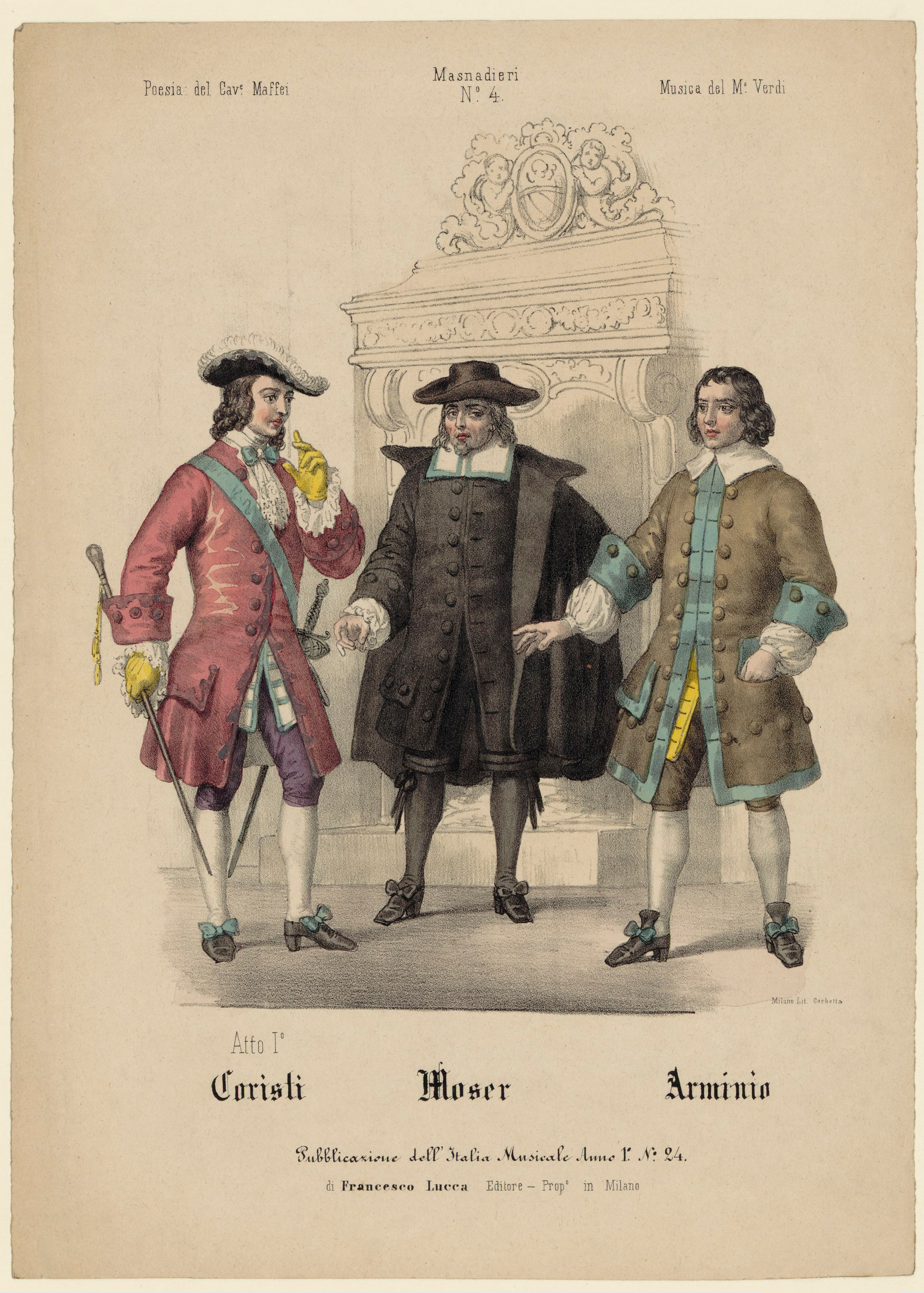
Act I Costumes: Chorister, Moser, and Arminio.

Scene 1: A tavern on the borders of Saxony.

During a break from his studies at Dresden University, Carlo, the elder and favourite son of Count Massimiliano Moor, has fallen amongst thieves. He has become a member of a gang of highwaymen and cut-throats who terrorise the local community by robbery, extortion and rowdy singing at all hours of the day and night.

But already Carlo has tired of living a life of depravity and longs to return home to be with Amalia, his gentle cousin and lifelong sweetheart (O mio castel paterno / "O castle of my fathers"). He is awaiting the reply to a letter he has sent to his father begging for forgiveness for his recent misdemeanors.

Rolla and the other robbers arrive with the longed-for reply from the Count. Carlo's joy soon turns to sorrow, and then anger (Nell'argilla maledetta / "Let my wrath plunge these swords into the accursed clay"), as he finds that the letter is not from his father but from his younger brother Francesco, who warns him not to return home because, far from having forgiven Carlo, the old Count is intent on punishing him and locking him away.

Carlo renounces his former life and swears an oath to remain with his new comrades for the rest of his days. The robbers unanimously elect him as their new leader.

Scene 2: A room in Count Moor's castle in Franconia.

Francesco is congratulating himself on having intercepted the letter from his brother to their father, knowing that Massimiliano would certainly have forgiven Carlo if he had received it. Now only the elderly, infirm Count stands between Francesco and the family title and estates, and he has devised a plan to hasten his father's death (La sua lampada vitale / "The lamp of his life burns low").

He forces Arminio, one of the castle servants, to disguise himself as a soldier recently arrived with tragic 'news' of Carlo's death, and sings his cabaletta, Tremate, o miseri / "Tremble, you wretches, you shall see me in my true terrible aspect".

Scene 3: Count Moor's bedroom in the castle.

Amalia is watching over the ailing Count. Each of them is thinking affectionately of the missing Carlo (Lo sguardo avea degli angeli / "His face had the smile of the angels").

Francesco ushers the disguised Arminio into the room. Arminio describes how he fought alongside Carlo for King Frederick in a battle for the city of Prague, and how he saw him mortally wounded. Carlo's final act in this world was to inscribe a message, using his own blood, on the blade of his sword, that Amalia and Francesco should marry.

Amalia and the Count are completely taken in; Massimiliano falls into a dead faint and Amalia, in a frenzy of hysteria, rushes offstage leaving a jubilant Francesco.

=== Act 2 ===
Scene 1: A graveyard near the castle.

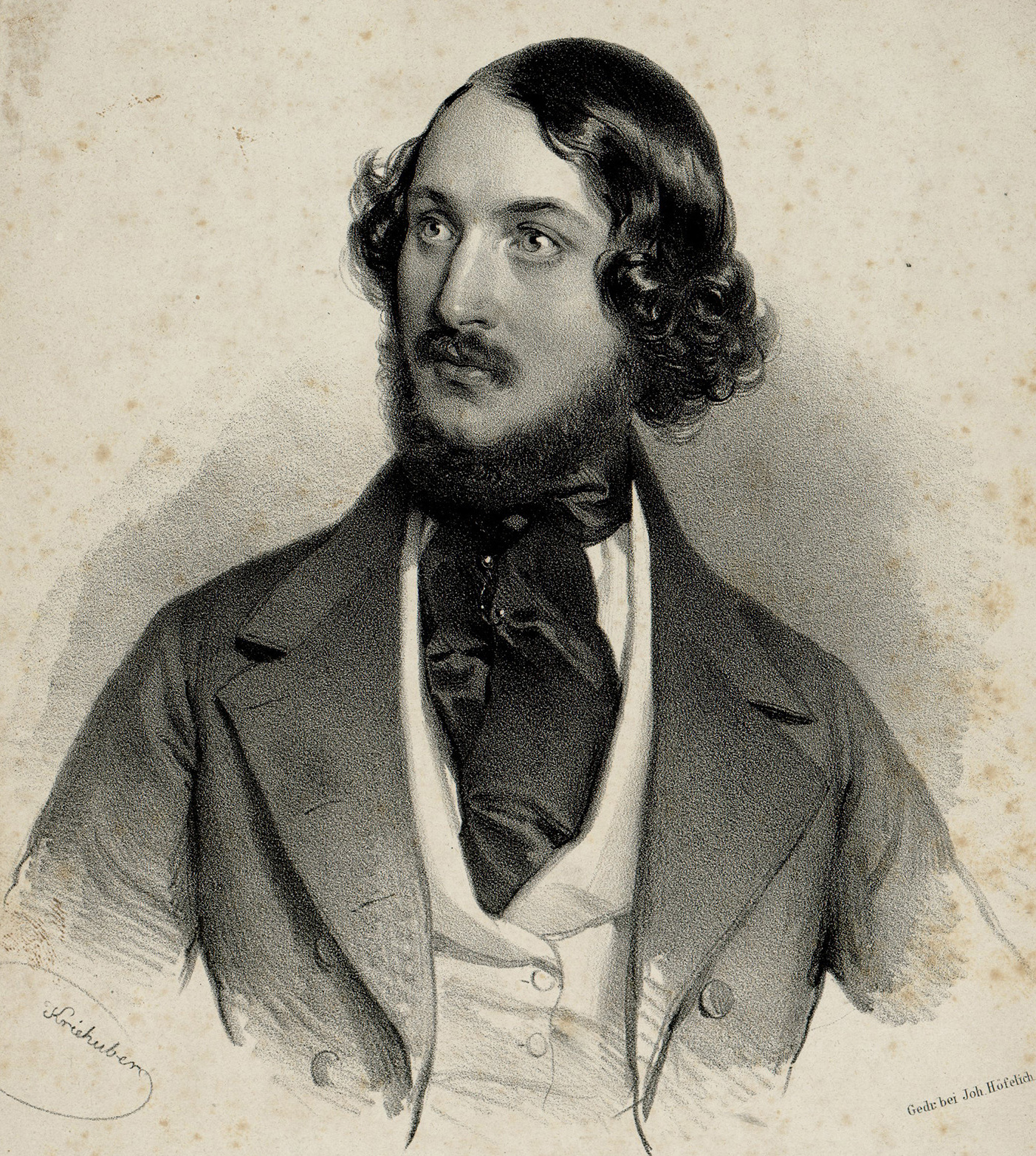
Filippo Coletti, who created the role of Francesco, by Josef Kriehuber (1841)

Several months have passed since the previous scene and Amalia enters to pray at Count Massimiliano's tomb (Tu del mio Carlo al seno / "Blessed spirit, you have flown to the bosom of my Carlo"). In the distance can be heard the sounds of a festive banquet hosted by Francesco, the new Count.

Arminio has followed Amalia from the castle because he is overcome by guilt at his part in Francesco's wicked scheming. He just has time to reveal that both Carlo and the old Count are still alive (provoking Amalia's cabaletta Carlo vive? O caro accento / "Carlo lives? ... O sweet words") before he is disturbed by the arrival of Francesco and forced to flee the scene.

Francesco has also been searching for Amalia with the intention of asking her to marry him. Her scornful refusal provokes him into a rage and he becomes violent. Amalia pretends a change of heart and embraces him so that she can seize his dagger and fend him off before making her escape into the nearby forest.

Scene 2: A clearing in a Bohemian forest.

Rolla has been captured in Prague and the brigands are awaiting the return of their leader, Carlo, who has gone to rescue him. The rescue is achieved, but at the same time Carlo has managed to set fire to much of the city, resulting in armed citizens pursuing him. The scene ends with Carlo exhorting his gallant band to fight like wolves to save themselves.

=== Act 3 ===
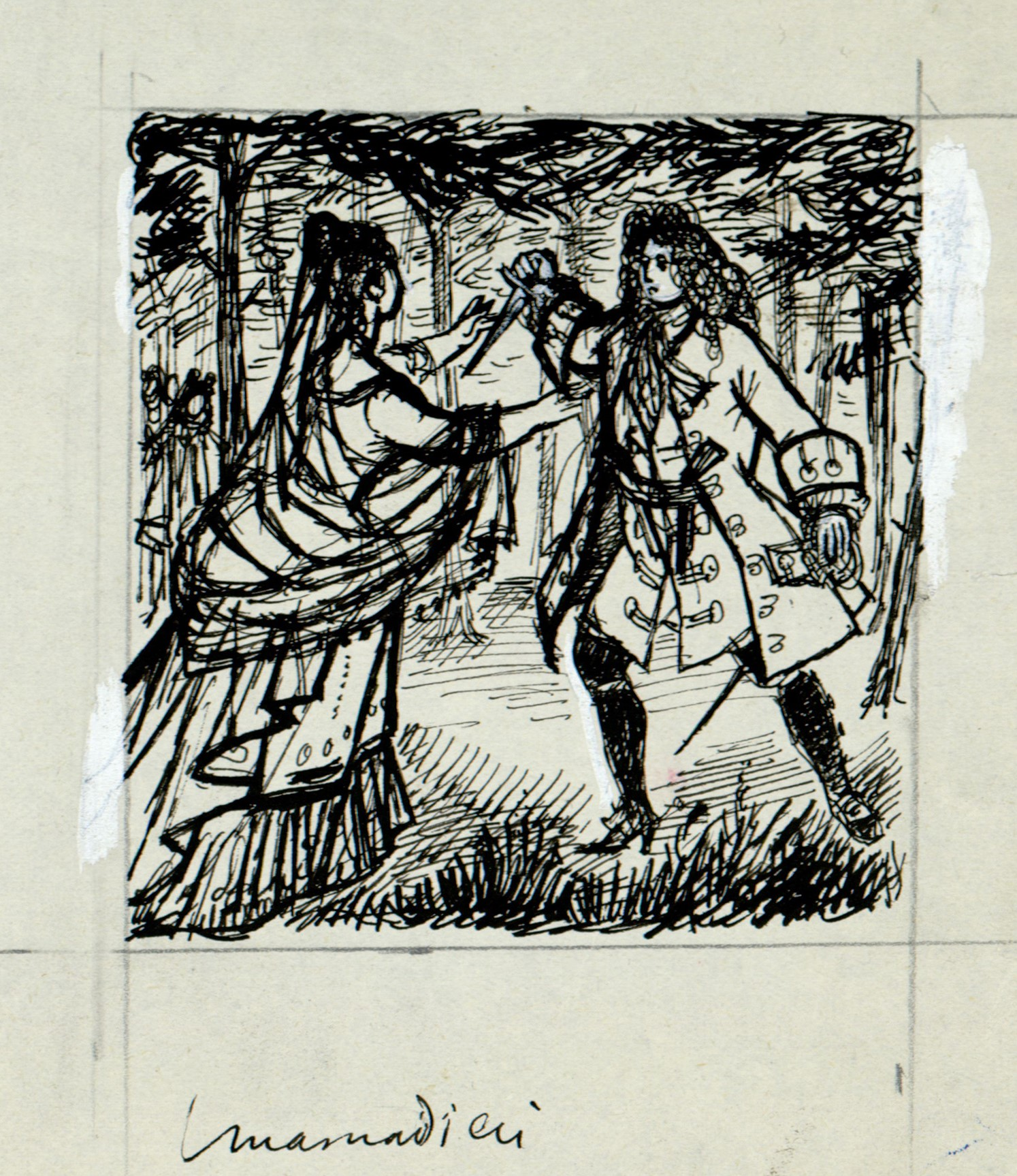
Disegno per copertina di libretto, drawing for I Masnadieri (undated).

Scene 1: A clearing in a Franconian forest.

The robbers sing of the pleasures of their criminal activities. They are now in the same forest as the distraught Amalia. Amalia fails to recognise her betrothed when he approaches her. Carlo reveals his identity, without mentioning his comrades, and there is a joyous reconciliation. Carlo is horrified when he learns of his brother's unsuccessful attack on her virtue.

Scene 2: Another clearing in the Franconian forest.

Carlo is alone and contemplates his dismal future (Di ladroni attorniato / "Surrounded by robbers, fettered to crime"). He considers suicide, but decides that he must accept his dreadful fate and live on in loneliness and misery, reviled by all decent people.

Arminio enters stealthily and approaches some nearby ruins. Hearing a voice within the ruins, Carlo investigates and discovers the emaciated figure of his father. Massimiliano fails to recognise his son, but nevertheless describes to him how Francesco attempted to bury him alive after his collapse on hearing of Carlo's death (Un ignoto tre lune or saranno / "An unknown - it will be three moons ago now - told me that my Carlo had been killed"). Fortunately Arminio saved him and has kept him hidden in the ruins where Carlo has found him.

Leaving the Count, Carlo calls on his band to storm the castle and capture his evil brother.

=== Act 4 ===
Scene 1: Another room in Count Moor's castle.

Francesco wakes after terrifying, guilt-ridden nightmares (Pareami che sorto da lauto convito / "I fancied that, having risen from a sumptuous banquet, I was sleeping ..."). He summons the local priest who refuses him absolution for his heinous crimes. At this point the brigands are heard storming the castle and Francesco rushes out, swearing that he will defy the very fires of Hell.

Scene 2: The second clearing in the Franconian forest.

Massimiliano bewails Carlo's death, although he still does not recognise that the man standing in front of him is his favourite son. He blesses the "unknown stranger" for saving his life.

The robbers reappear and report that they had not been able to capture Francesco. This pleases Carlo who intends to change his ways. At this moment Amalia is dragged in by the brigands. Carlo is forced to admit to her, and to his father, his role as leader of the robbers. Massimiliano expresses his horror and despair, but Amalia declares that despite everything she still loves Carlo and wants to stay with him.

Although Carlo has sworn to change his ways, he has also given his oath of lifelong allegiance to his band of robbers. He cannot allow the woman he loves to be dragged down into his world of degradation and disgrace and he cannot escape his own evil fate; he resolves this paradox by stabbing Amalia to death. Carlo rushes offstage claiming he is going in search of his own death.

== Orchestration ==
I masnadieri is scored for piccolo, flute, two oboes, two clarinets, two bassoons, four horns, two trumpets, three trombones, cimbasso, timpani, bass drum cymbals, harp, and strings.

== Music ==
In his essay on this opera in Grove, Roger Parker refers to the overall quality and style of the music, and notes that the opera "contains much more fine music than is commonly supposed, but it has an unusually high proportion of solo arias" and, therefore, fewer ensembles. It is the first early opera not to open with a chorus or contain a finale concertato. Budden also finds some "fine things" in the music and names (amongst others) the prelude, the act 1 tenor's cavatina plus the quartet in the finale and, in act 2, the choruses, plus the trio which is the finale of act 4, but comments on the fact that they appear to be "isolated, not part of the general scheme."

But David Kimbell, writing in The New Penguin Opera Guide remarks on some of the features which limited its success. For example, he notes that "the arbiters of taste in London still found Verdi's music disagreeably violent and in making the tenor the focus of dramatic interest he failed to exploit popularity enjoyed in the city by Jenny Lind", but he goes on to state that "Verdi fashion[ed] his music as much to match the talents of his performers as the requirements of his dramatic theme." In Lind, it appears that Verdi found a voice that caused him to create "tinsel-like" music, since (according to Muzio, with which Budden presumes Verdi agrees) it is a voice with its trills and embellishments which is "the sort of thing which people liked in the last century [i.e. 18th century] but not in 1847."

Referring to some of the conflicting elements of the libretto referred to above, Baldini quotes from Basevi's 1859 comment on the unsuitability of the music to the harshness of the text:

Perhaps to demonstrate more clearly the inability of music to express absolute evil, Verdi therefore attaches to Francesco Moor's terrible words a melody which would eminently suit the tenderest of loves. He could have used abstruse harmonies, jagged rhythms etc. etc. but he chose not to; perhaps he would have done better not to set these unfortunate words at all.

== Recordings ==
=== Audio recordings ===
Year	Cast (Massimiliano, Carlo, Francesco, Amalia)	Conductor, Opera House and Orchestra	Label
1971	Bonaldo Giaiotti; Gastone Limarilli; Mario Petri; Rita Orlandi-Malaspina	Franco Mannino, RAI National Symphony Orchestra and Chorus (Live recording of 11 June performance)	Audio CD: Myto; Cat: MDCD0011
1972	Boris Christoff; Gianni Raimondi; Renato Bruson; Ilva Ligabue	Gianandrea Gavazzeni, Rome Opera Orchestra and Chorus (Live recording of 29 November performance)	Audio CD: Opera D'Oro; Cat: OPD 1346
1974	Ruggero Raimondi; Carlo Bergonzi; Piero Cappuccilli; Montserrat Caballé	Lamberto Gardelli, New Philharmonia Orchestra and the Ambrosian Singers	Audio CD: Philips; Cat: 422 423-2 (1989 release), E4758703 (2007 re-release)
1982	Samuel Ramey; Franco Bonisolli; Matteo Manuguerra; Joan Sutherland	Richard Bonynge, Welsh National Opera Orchestra and Chorus	Audio CD: Decca; Cat: 433 854-2

=== Video recording ===
Year	Cast (Massimiliano, Carlo, Francesco, Amalia)	Conductor, Opera House and Orchestra	Producer	Label
2012	Giacomo Prestia, Aquiles Machado, Artur Ruciński, Lucrecia Garcia	Nicola Luisotti, Teatro di San Carlo, Naples (Recording of performances at the San Carlo, March 2012)	Gabriele Lavia	DVD:C Major; Cat:722208
