= Church of the Nativity of the Virgin Mary, Bitola =

Macedonian Orthodox church in North Macedonia

Coordinates: 41°01′49″N 21°20′20″E

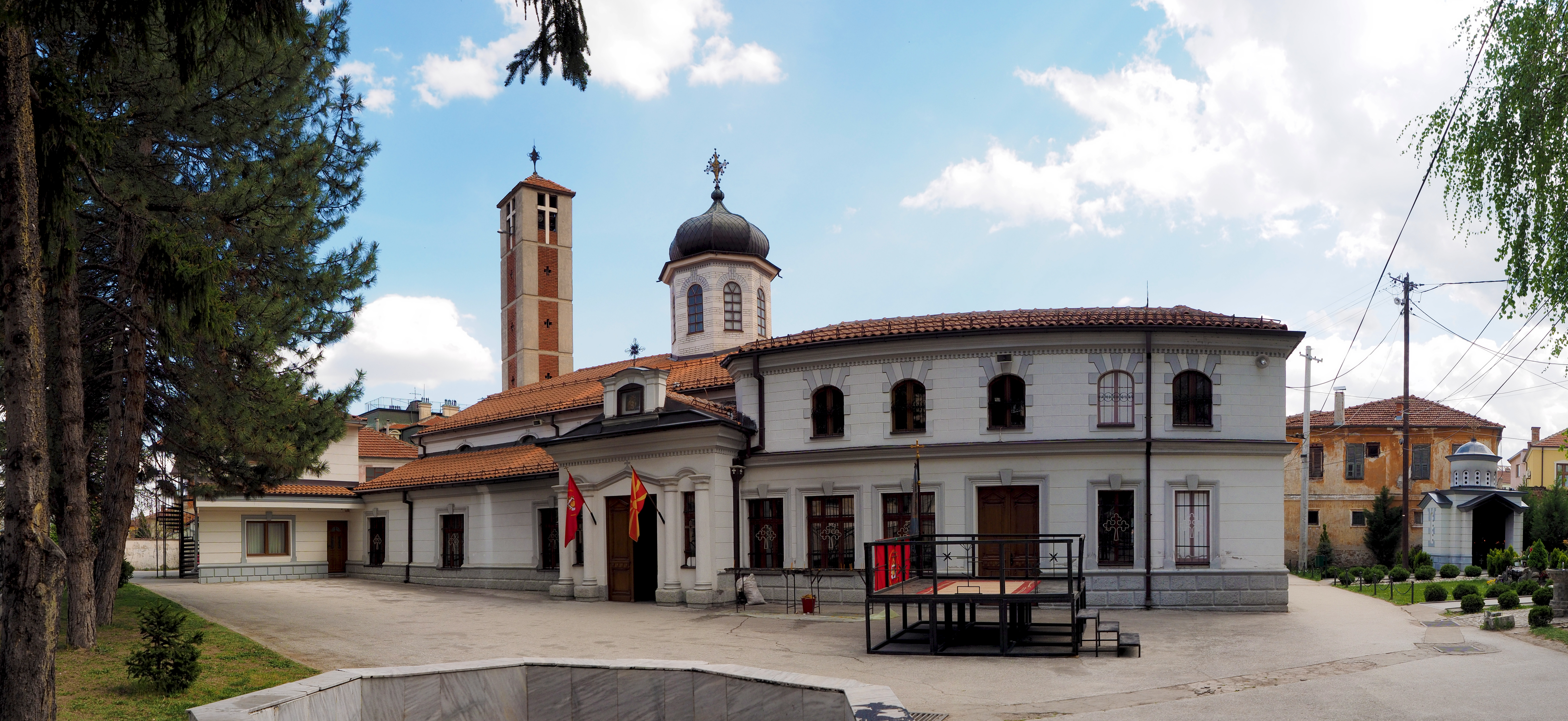
Façade view

The Church of the Nativity of the Virgin Mary (Macedonian: Црква „Св. Богородица“, romanized: Crkva „Sv. Bogorodica“) is a Macedonian Orthodox church of the Prespa-Pelagona Diocese in Bitola, North Macedonia. The church was built in 1870 and consecrated in 1876 by the Bulgarian Exarchist community and has icons dating from the 19th century. Among the church's icons is a čudotvorna ("miraculous") icon of the Virgin Mary that had been stolen from the church in the 1970s and returned in 2017.

The church is listed as an Object of Cultural Heritage by the Ministry of Culture.
