= Carlo Meliciani =

Italian opera singer (1929–2022)

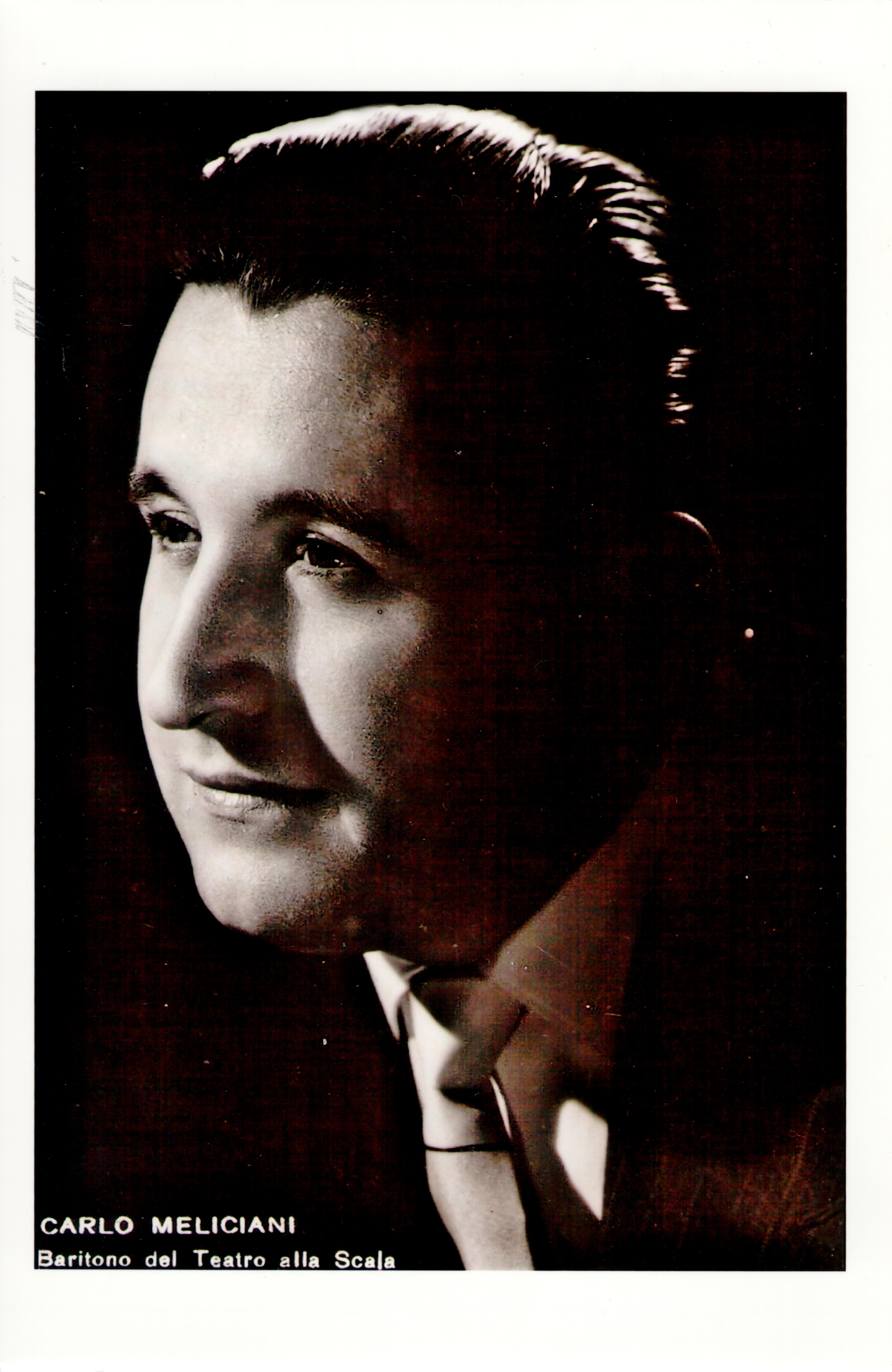
Carlo Meliciani

Carlo Meliciani (27 January 1929 – 6 January 2022) was an Italian operatic baritone who had an active international career from the mid-1950s through the late 1970s.

From 1959 to 1979 he was on the roster of singers at La Scala in Milan. Although he sang a wide repertoire, he was particularly known for his portrayal of roles from the operas of Giuseppe Verdi. He notably recorded the part of Don Carlo in Ernani in 1969 with Plácido Domingo in the title role.

== Career ==
Meliciani was born in Arezzo, Italy, and began his career in the mid-1950s performing with a touring Italian opera company in Great Britain. In the 1958–1959 season he was committed to the Teatro Nuovo di Torino, performing such roles as Amonasro in Aida and Don Carlo in Ernani. In 1959 he joined the roster of singers at La Scala, making his debut at that opera house as Ping in Giacomo Puccini's Turandot. He remained a regular performer there up into the late 1970s, performing such roles as Alfio in Cavalleria Rusticana, Alfonso XI of Castile in La favorite, Amonasro, the Count di Luna in Il trovatore, Czernikowski in Boris Godunov, Don Carlo in Ernani, Don Carlo di Vargas in La forza del destino, Renato in Un ballo in maschera, Enrico in Lucia di Lammermoor, Posa in Don Carlos, Scarpia in Tosca, Sonora in La fanciulla del West, Stárek in Jenůfa, and the title roles in Nabucco and Rigoletto. He also appeared in the world premieres of Ildebrando Pizzetti's Il calzare d'argento (1961, Benintende) and Guido Turchi's Il buon soldato Svejk (1962, the Marshal).

Outside of La Scala, Meliciani worked regularly as a guest artist at important Italian opera houses. In 1960 he sang Rigoletto at the Baths of Caracalla in Rome with Renata Scotto as Gilda and Giuseppe Campora as the Duke of Mantua. He sang the same role at the Teatro Massimo in Palermo the following year and at the Teatro Comunale Florence in 1965. In 1973 he portrayed the role of Paolo in Simon Boccanegra at the Arena di Verona Festival. He also made guest appearances at the Teatro Donizetti, Teatro Lirico Giuseppe Verdi, the Teatro Massimo, the Teatro Petruzzelli, the Teatro Sociale in Rovigo, and at opera houses in Mantua, Cremona, and Piacenza among others. Some of his other stage roles were Gérard in Andrea Chénier, Tonio in Pagliacci, Vincenzo Gellner in La Wally, and the King's herald in Lohengrin.

Meliciani was also active on the international stage. In 1961 he made appearances at the Liceu, the Wiesbaden Opera House (Riccardo in Bellini's I puritani), the Greek National Opera, and the Théâtre de Beaulieu in Lausanne (Rigoletto). The following year he performed at the Palacio de Bellas Artes in Mexico City. In November 1968 he made his United States debut with the Philadelphia Grand Opera Company as Amonasro to Elinor Ross's Aida and Nell Rankin's Amneris. He returned to Philadelphia to sing Rigoletto to the Gilda of Roberta Peters (1970) and Amonasro to the Radamès of Richard Tucker (1970–1971). He also appeared at the Connecticut Opera in 1970.

He died in Empoli on 6 January 2022, at the age of 92 from COVID-19 during the COVID-19 pandemic in Italy.
