= Vladimir Kastorsky =

Russian and Soviet opera singer

Vladimir Ivanovich Kastorsky
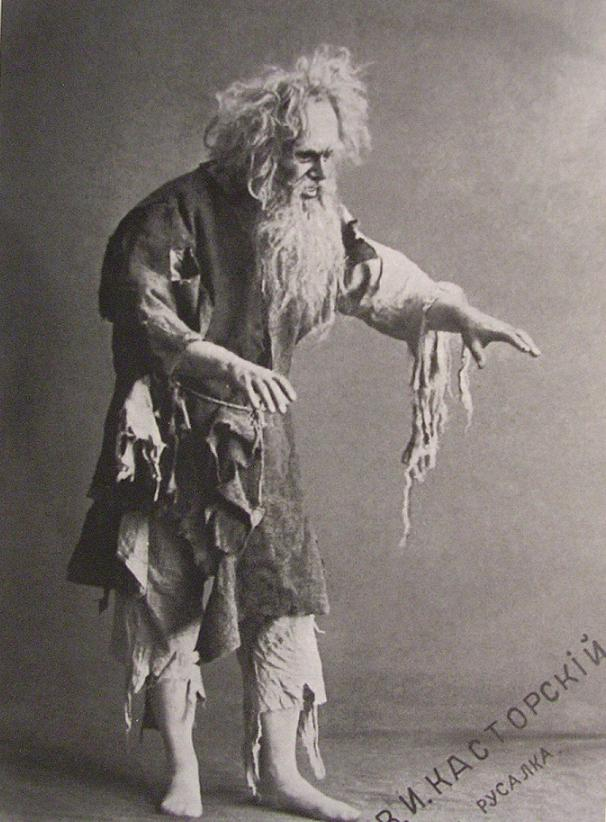
- Kastorsky as the miller in the opera Rusalka
- Born: 14 March 1870; Nekrasovskoye, Russian Empire
- Died: 2 July 1948 (aged 78); Leningrad, Soviet Union
- Occupation: Opera singer

Vladimir Ivanovich Kastorsky (March 14, 1870 – July 2, 1948) was a Russian and Soviet opera singer, chamber singer, and vocal teacher.
