= Ernani =

Opera by Giuseppe Verdi

- Opera by Giuseppe Verdi
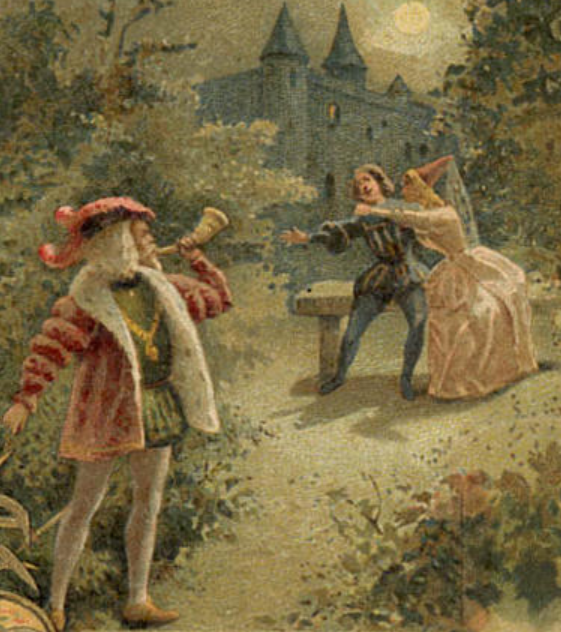
- When all seems to be well, Silva sounds the trumpet call to Ernani to surrender.
- Librettist: Francesco Maria Piave
- Language: Italian
- Based on: Hernani by Victor Hugo
- Premiere: 9 March 1844; Teatro La Fenice, Venice

Ernani is an operatic dramma lirico in four acts by Giuseppe Verdi to an Italian libretto by Francesco Maria Piave, based on the 1830 play Hernani by Victor Hugo.

Verdi was commissioned by the Teatro La Fenice in Venice to write an opera, but finding the right subject took some time, and the composer worked with the inexperienced Piave in shaping first one and then another drama by Hugo into an acceptable libretto. As musicologist Roger Parker notes, the composer "intervened on several important points, insisting for example that the role of Ernani be sung by a tenor (rather than by a contralto as had originally been planned)".

Ernani was first performed on 9 March 1844, and it was "immensely popular, and was revived countless times during its early years".

It became Verdi's most popular opera until it was superseded by Il trovatore after 1853. In 1903, it became the first opera to be recorded completely.

== Composition history ==
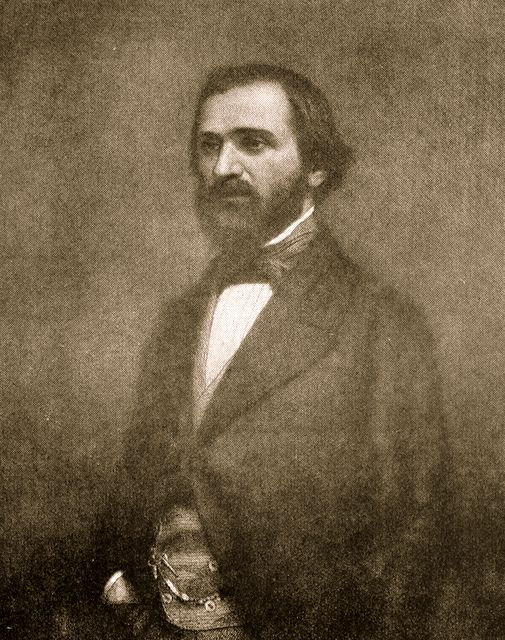
Verdi

Following the success of both Nabucco and I Lombardi, Verdi was approached by many opera companies wanting to commission him to write an opera for their houses. Rather than prepare another for La Scala, he was interested in a commission for two operas for the 1843–44 season (one of which would be I Lombardi) which came from the President of the Teatro la Fenice in Venice, Marquis Nanni Mocenigo.

However, the composer was only willing to accept the terms which he proposed: 12,000 Austrian lire to be paid after the first performance, not the third as proposed by Venice (Verdi recalled what had happened to Un giorno di regno with its one and only performance). Amongst other stipulations, he demanded the right to choose his own subject and his own librettist, and also to pay him directly, as well as refusing to accept the requirement that a full orchestral score be available in advance. In addition, he had the right to choose the singers from the assembled company for that season. David Kimbell notes one additional demand:

He explains [to Mocenigo at La Fenice]—and this was rare at the time—that he began to compose only when the libretto was completed to his satisfaction because "when I have a general conception of the whole poem, the music comes of its own accord"

Once this agreement was settled upon, the next step was to choose a subject, something which took some time. Several subjects came to Verdi's attention: for example, Byron's The Corsair was considered, but the right baritone was not available. In thinking about an opera about the Venetian Foscari family, he found that it was forbidden by the censor in order to avoid upsetting any of the descendants of that family who were then living in Venice. (Both of these subjects were to become later Verdi operas, Il corsaro and I due Foscari, the latter opening in Rome later in 1844.)

An unsolicited manuscript from the unknown Francesco Piave (who was La Fenice's resident poet and stage manager in addition to being a friend of Brenna, the company's Secretary) proposed an opera, Cromwell, based on Victor Hugo's play, and on which he had started work. Mocenigo assured the composer of Piave's sense of the theatre and of musical forms, and so they agreed to proceed, although by the time of its approval by the Fenice authorities, it had become Allan Cameron, a story set in the time just prior to the accession of Britain's Charles II. Immediately, Verdi took control and made it clear to Piave what he wanted in the way of a theatrical experience: "...Let's have as few words as possible ... Remember that brevity is never a fault ... But I do insist on brevity because that's what the public wants..."

=== The idea for Hernani ===
The Cromwell libretto arrived from Piave in pieces, and Verdi put it away until he had the complete version to work from. However, when the composer and La Fenice's president met in Venice in late August, Verdi expressed some dissatisfaction at how the libretto had turned out. Then Mocenigo's casual reference to Hugo's successful 1830 drama Hernani as an idea for a libretto caught Verdi's imagination, as seen in a letter which the latter wrote to Mocenigo in early September which expressed concerns about Allan Cameron and the way it had turned out, though noting that this was "the fault of the subject and not the poet". He continues:

But oh, if only we could do Hernani instead that would be tremendous. I know that it would mean a great deal of trouble for the poet but my first task would be to try and compensate him... all he would have to do would be to condense and tighten up; the action is already there ready made, and it's all immensely good theatre. Tomorrow I'll write at length to Piave setting out all the scenes from Hernani which seem to me suitable.

At this point he continues with suggestions for the poet. For Verdi, the appeal of Hugo's work – which the latter described as "Romanticism or the Liberalism in literature" – was "the struggle between love and honour", and Budden sums up this appeal as "Within Hugo's scheme each illogical action follows logically from the one that precedes it, giving Verdi the pace, the eventfulness and above all the dramatic unity that he has been looking for."

=== Setting the play as the opera, Ernani ===
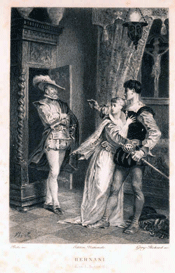
Act 1, sc. 1 of Hernani: the king steps from the cupboard to confront Hernani and Doña Sol (Elvira)

However, Piave was not at all pleased by this turn of events and felt that an opera based on Hernani could not be staged because of censorship. For instance, the King's first appearance in the play is from a cupboard where he has been hiding since some time after his arrival and before he meets Elvira. Thus he overhears much of the interaction between Elvira and Ernani before finally revealing himself. Verdi must have realized that no king "would ever be allowed to hide in a cupboard", according to Budden.

But the La Fenice directorate did approve the concept and the librettist was offered compensation, although he saved his Allan Cameron in reserve in case of mishap. As it evolved, the opera – originally titled Don Ruy Gomez de Silva in synopsis form – came more and more "to reflect the unique character of the parent drama" as Verdi wished to stick as closely as possible to the original play. For Budden, this "marks a new outlook in Italian opera", because this would never have occurred to either Rossini or Donizetti, for whom plots were interchangeable.

Although Verdi had agreed to try to accommodate the contralto Carolina Vietti when the opera was Allan Cameron, he was against making the leading character of Ernani a musico contralto. However, he compromised somewhat and, by the end of October, it appeared that the four voice types were to be soprano (Elvira), contralto (Ernani), tenor (Don Carlo), and baritone (de Silva), but after the acceptance of the libretto by the Venetian police, Verdi was able to hold firm and ultimately get what he wanted: a soprano, a tenor, a baritone, and – although Rosi was not an experienced enough singer – a bass in the role of de Silva. Thus it became a comprimario role, one to be sung by a second-rung singer in the company. But, as Budden notes, Verdi's "difficulties with singers were not yet over".

The season opened with I Lombardi in December 1843. It was a disaster, with terrible singing from the tenor Domenico Conti. Two other operas early in the 1843/44 season were equally poorly received. Having heard one other potential tenor, Vitali, as a possible replacement, the composer presented an ultimatum: either be released from his contract or the company would engage Carlo Guasco in the role of Ernani. With a premiere set for March, two final glitches were overcome: the bass Rosi had disappeared from consideration as de Silva but was replaced by Meini, who then withdrew because he found the part too low. Verdi then engaged a member of the chorus, the bass Antonio Selva who went on to a distinguished career. And, in spite of complaints from the soprano, Sophie Löwe, that she was not to be front and centre for the finale, she became part of the final trio.

== Verdi and theatre ==
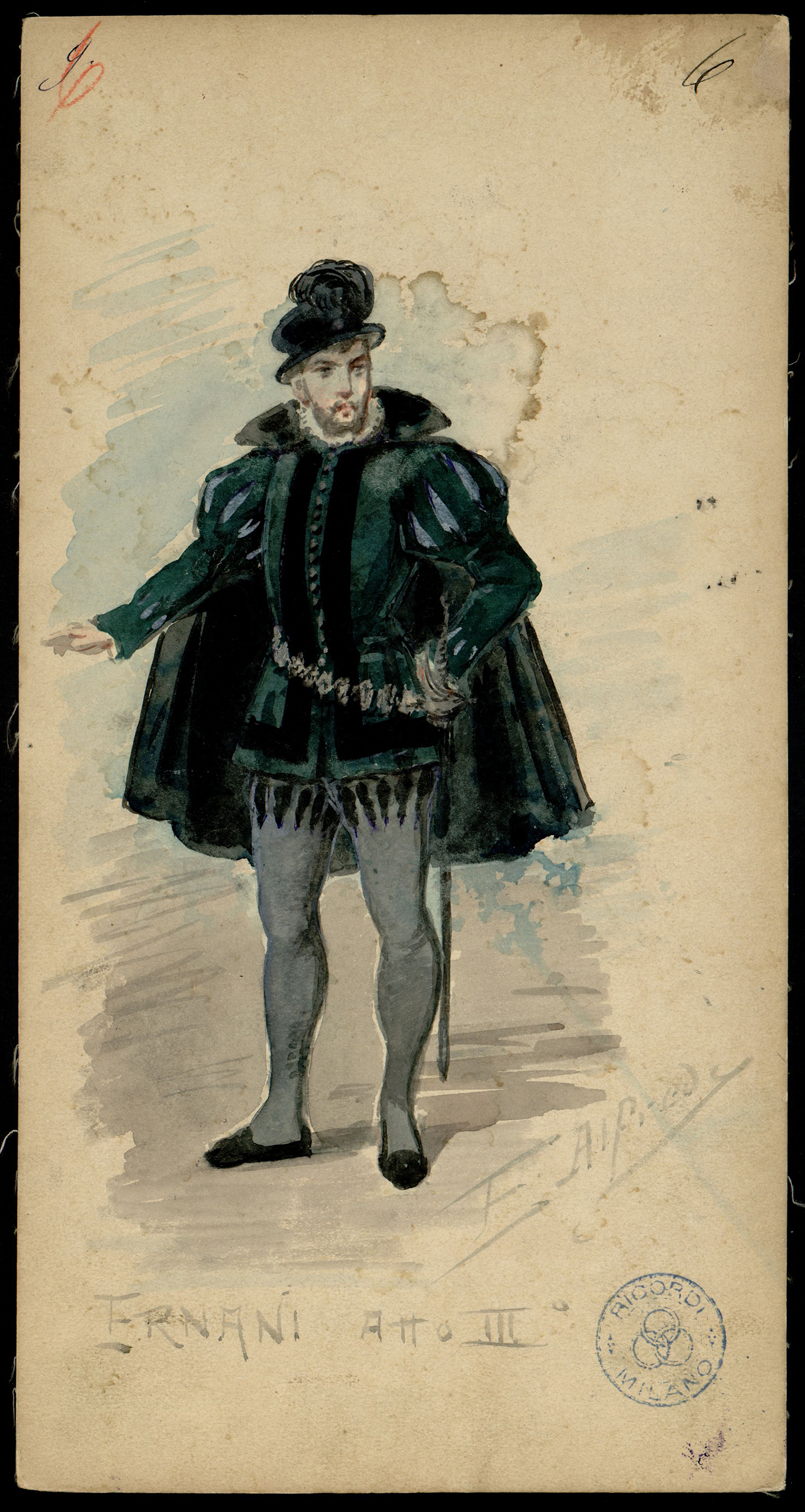
Ernani, costume design for Ernani, act 3 (1881)

Budden notes the following in regard to the specific relationship between this opera and the work of Victor Hugo:

...from the first the spirit of Hugo is there. Verdi [ten years younger than the playwright] was part of that youthful audience to which the play Hernani is addressed. The bounding energy of Hugo's alexandrines is reflected in the spirit of Verdi's music, which is far more forceful than anything he had written so far. Victor Hugo, one might say, was good for Verdi; and it significant that both the operas that he based on Hugo's plays (the other was of course Rigoletto) were landmarks in his career.

But it is the composer himself who, in a letter to Brenna, the La Fenice secretary and a friend of Piave's, sums up his own sense of theatre, of what works and what does not. This was written at a time when Piave was unhappy about the shift from his original libretto to the one for what became Ernani. With this shift came many changes of direction as issues such as casting came into consideration, and Verdi asks Brenna to communicate his feelings to the librettist:

However little experience I may have had, I do go to the theatre [Verdi is referring to the opera house] all the year round and I pay the most careful attention to what I see and hear. I've been able to put my finger on so many works which wouldn't have failed if the pieces had been better laid out, the effects better calculated, the musical forms clearer, etc... in a word, if either the composer or the poet had been more experienced.

In effect, Verdi is taking control over all aspects of the piece, which includes the condensation of the sprawling play into his four acts. (The first two acts of Hugo's play become act 1 of the opera). Rather than allow the librettist a free hand in composing his verses, "this would have perpetuated in a diminished form the word-music division that Verdi precisely wanted to get away from. The composer's desire to take charge of every aspect of an opera implied that he had the power to decide what weight to give the text and the music, respectively, depending upon the "moment" of the action.

== Performance history ==
=== 19th century ===
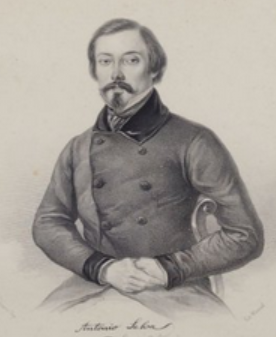
Antonio Selva, the first Silva

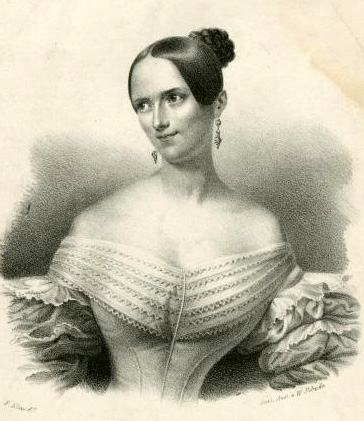
Sophie Löwe, the first Elvira

Budden sums up the opening night success of Ernani: nothing "prevented [the opera] from being a tremendous success. With it, Verdi's fame took a new leap which carried it at once across the boundaries of Italy. For better or worse, he was now a world composer ... [and] wherever there was an Italian opera house, Ernani arrived sooner or later." However, it was not all smooth sailing: due to Hugo's opposition, the first performances in Paris at the Théâtre des Italiens two years later required a change of title – to Il proscritto – and a change of characters' names: "The practice was followed in other cities where the names Victor Hugo and Hernani smacked of revolution." In Palermo in 1845 it became Elvira d'Aragona and in Messina in 1847 the title became Il proscritto ossia Il corsaro di Venezia. Overall, Ernani was staged in one form or another up to the mid-1850s, with "32 theatres [giving] the work in 1844, 60 in 1845, and at least 65 in 1846, not including revivals in houses that had already presented it."

The United Kingdom premiere, the first of Verdi's operas to be translated into English, took place at Her Majesty's Theatre in London on 8 March 1845 followed on 13 April 1847 by its US premiere in New York City. Ernani was first performed in Buenos Aires on 8 July 1849.

=== 20th century and beyond ===
Ernani appeared on the roster of the Metropolitan Opera as early as 1903 and has been given many times since then. The opera was revived in a series of new productions at the San Francisco Opera (1982), the Met (1983), the Lyric Opera of Chicago (1984), and at La Scala (1984). It was given as part of the 1997 season of the Sarasota Opera's "Verdi Cycle". The Teatro Regio di Parma, another company with the aim of presenting every Verdi opera, gave it in October 2005.

Today Ernani receives numerous performances at opera houses around the world.

== Roles ==
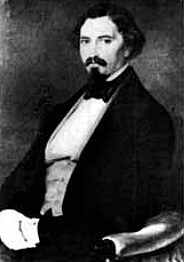
Carlo Guasco, the first Ernani

Role	Voice type	Premiere cast, 9 March 1844 Conductor: Gaetano Mares
Ernani, the bandit	tenor	Carlo Guasco
Don Carlo, later Charles V, Holy Roman Emperor	baritone	Antonio Superchi
Don Ruy Gomez de Silva	bass	Antonio Selva
Elvira, his niece and fiancée	soprano	Sophie Löwe
Giovanna, her nurse	soprano	Laura Saini
Don Riccardo, Don Carlo's equerry	tenor	Giovanni Lanner
Jago, Don Ruy's equerry	bass	Andrea Bellini
Rebels, brigands, attendants, knights, servant, nobles, ladies – Chorus

== Synopsis ==
Francesco Maria Piave, the librettist

Time: 1519.
Place: Aragon, Aachen, and Zaragoza.

=== Act 1 ===
Mountains of Aragon

The bandits demand the reason for Ernani's gloom (Chorus: Evviva! Beviam! Beviam! / "To you we drink"; Ernani pensoso! / "Ernani, so gloomy? Why, oh strong one, does care sit on your brow?"). Ernani replies that he loves Elvira (Recitative: "Thanks, dear friends"; Cavatina: Come rugiada al cespite / "As the flower turns to the sun"), who is about to be married against her will to old Gomez de Silva (O tu che l'alma adora). He asks the bandits to abduct her.

In Elvira's chamber

Elvira worries about her upcoming marriage (Scena: "Now sinks the sun and Silva does not return"; Cavatina: Ernani, Ernani involami / "Ernani, Ernani, save me") as servants deliver Silva's wedding presents to her. She reaffirms her love for Ernani (Tutto sprezzo che d'Ernani / "I scorn everything which does not speak to my heart of Ernani"). King Carlo enters, declaring his love for Elvira, who rejects it, admitting she is in love with another man. As Carlo attempts to use force, she grasps a dagger, while Ernani suddenly arrives to defend her. Carlo recognizes Ernani as the leader of the bandits. (Trio: "Tu se' Ernani! Me 'l dice lo sdegno" / "You are Ernani! The scorn that invades this soul tells that to me"). Ernani replies that Carlo killed his father, robbed him of his lands and forced him into a life of banditry. As he invites Carlo to fight, Silva appears and sees them both, guessing correctly that they are trying to seduce Elvira (Infelice!... e tu credevi... che mai vegg'io! / "Dreadful sight"; Silva's cavatina: "Unhappy man! You thought this lovely...was yours").

[La Scala, Autumn 1844, Silva's cabaletta added: "Infin che un brando vindice" using music originally written for Verdi's first opera, Oberto]

Silva wants to fight both the seductors to restore his honour, when Riccardo approaches and recognises the king. Silva is horrified and apologizes to the king, who in turn decides to save Ernani, saying that is one of his servants. Ernani whispers to Elvira to prepare to flee, while Carlo starts talking with Silva about his rights for the Holy Roman Empire.

=== Act 2 ===
A hall in Silva's palace

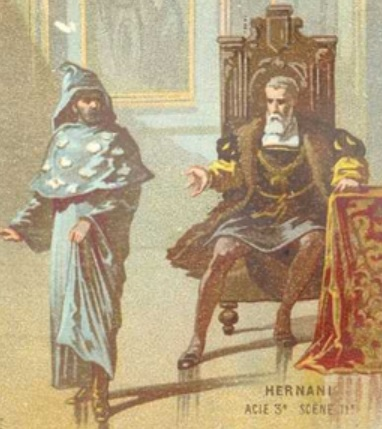
Scene from Hugo's play: Ernani seeks shelter

Ernani enters disguised as a pilgrim. He asks for shelter, which Silva grants him, and then learns from Silva that he is about to marry Elvira, who believes Ernani to be dead. Ernani reveals his true identity to everyone, begging to be handed to the king. Silva however decides to keep his word and protect Ernani. The bandit then confronts Elvira, who tells him that she was planning to kill herself at the altar (Duet: Ah, morir potessi adesso / "Ah, if I could die now"). Silva walks in, discovering the pair, and furiously decides to kill Ernani. However, he is stopped by one of his men, Jago, who tells of the impending arrival of the king. Silva decides to hide Ernani and exact his vengeance on him later. (Trio: No, vendetta più tremenda / "No, I want to keep a greater revenge"). Carlo arrives and wishes to know why the castle is barred. Silva refuses to surrender Ernani (Carlo's aria: Lo vedremo, veglio audace / "We shall see, you bold old man") and Don Carlo's men cannot find Ernani's hiding place. Silva keeps his word, even when the king secures Elvira as a hostage. Finally alone, Silva releases Ernani, challenging him to a duel. Ernani refuses to fight, pleading to see on last time Elvira and die. After Silva reveals that the king has taken her as hostage, Ernani reveals that Carlo loves Elvira, too. After that, Silva is convinced to posticipate again his revenge on Ernani. They join forces to retrieve Elvira and kill Carlo. Therefore, Ernani swears to die whenever Silva will sound a horn he gives to him. ("Se uno squillo intenderà, tosto Ernani morirà" / "If Ernani will hear a sound, Ernani will die at moment")

[Added for Parma, 26 December 1844: "at Rossini's request, Verdi wrote a grand aria for the tenor Nicola Ivanoff". Ernani gathers his men to him. His aria of vengeance: Sprezzo la vita né più m'alletta / "Life means nothing to me, only hope of vengeance" concludes the act].

=== Act 3 ===
Act 3: "O sommo Carlo"
Sung by Mattia Battistini, Emilia Corsi, Luigi Colazza, Aristodemo Sillich, and the La Scala chorus in 1906

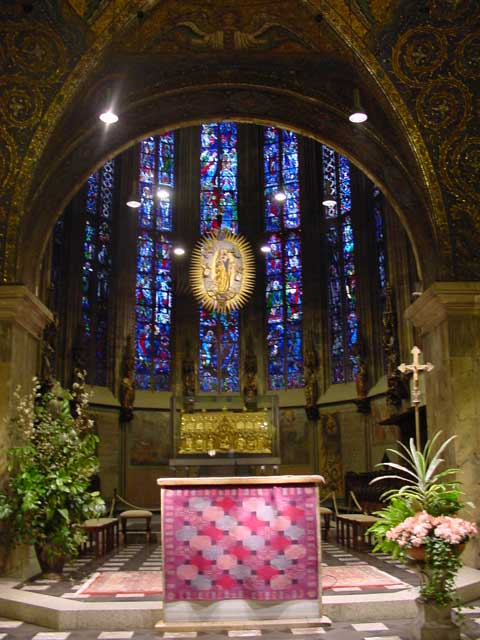
Shrine of Charles at Aachen

In the burial vault of Charles the Great at Aachen

Carlo visits the grave of the emperor Charlemagne (Carlo Magno), whose successor, the new Holy Roman Emperor, is being elected by delegates from the relevant countries. Carlo resolves to change his life if he is crowned (Cavatina: Oh, de' verd'anni miei/ "Oh, the dreams and deceits of my youth"). Hiding behind the vault, he overhears a gathering of conspirators including Silva and Ernani. Ernani swears to murder Carlo. (Choir: "Si ridesti il leon di Castiglia" / "Let the lion of Castille awaken") The conspiracy is foiled when Carlo's attendants enter and surprise the conspirators. The king commands that all the traitorous noblemen be executed. Ernani steps forward, declaring that thus he must die too; he is not the bandit Ernani, but Don Juan of Aragon, whose lands were taken from him. Elvira, who had been brought to Carlo as his intended empress, begs mercy for her lover, and Carlo, whose mood has changed, forgives all the conspirators and places Elvira's hand in that of Ernani. Silva is furious.

=== Act 4 ===
Ernani's Castle

Elvira and Ernani have just been married, when, in consternation, Ernani hears a bugle call. Silva arrives, wearing a mask, and hands him a cup of poison and a dagger. Ernani asks for time to "sip from the cup of love" (Ascolta, ascolta un detto ancor/ "Listen, just one word...") but, cursed by Silva as a coward, Ernani keeps his oath and stabs himself in the heart (Trio with Silva: È vano, o donna, il piangere, è vano / "Your weeping is in vain, woman"). He dies in Elvira's arms, telling her to live.

== Orchestration ==
Ernani is scored for one piccolo, one flute, two oboes, two clarinets, one bass clarinet, two bassoons, four horns, two trumpets, three trombones, one cimbasso, one harp, timpani, bass drum and cymbals, snare drum, on-stage band with on-stage bass drum, one offstage horn, six offstage trumpets, and strings.

== Music ==
Noting that the dramatic structure of this opera "brought about a fresh consideration of the fixed forms of Italian opera, in particular an expansion and enrichment of the solo aria and duet together with a more flexible approach to the musical sequences that bind together lyrical pieces", Roger Parker continues by stating that of greatest importance was "Verdi's gathering sense of musical drama's larger rhetoric, his increasing control over the dynamics of entire acts rather than merely of entire numbers. In this respect, the third act of Ernani sets up an imposing standard of coherence, one that is rarely equalled until the operas of the early 1850s."

However, it is writer Gabriele Baldini (whose specialization was in English literature) who in 1980 points to one of the most significant aspects of Ernani's dramatic and musical structure, the concept of male vocal archetypes, something which is echoed in Budden's 1984 chapter on this opera. Baldini writes of the musical conflicts inherent in the drama as a result of the use of certain voice types:

A youthful, passionate female voice is besieged by three male voices, each of whom establishes a specific relationship with her. The siege is fruitless. The male voices, or rather registers, meet with various fates, and each is granted a relationship with the woman, although on different levels. This relationship varies in intensity of passion according to the distance between the soprano register and the particular male voice.

Therefore, it is the lowest voice [the bass, de Silva], which is "farthest away, and thus his relationship is the coldest and most retrained". The baritone [the King, Don Carlo] "manages to draw somewhat closer, although indirectly and ambiguously", but Baldini continues by noting that it the highest male voice [the tenor, Ernani] who "gets near a relationship which if not complete ... is at least reciprocated for long periods".

Finally, while Baldini agrees with Parker that it is act 3 of Ernani which is the strongest – "in my opinion it marks the first occasion on which Verdi enclosed within a fairly extended musical space (about twenty five minutes) a perfect structural unit" – he also echoes Budden and De Van in noting the importance of the opening horn motif and references to the horn which recur throughout the opera and which ends with the final horn call, the fatal summons to Ernani by de Silva.

== Recordings ==
The first complete recording of an opera was the 1904 recording of Ernani, on 40 single-sided discs, by the Gramophone Company in England. Later recordings include:

Year	Cast (Ernani, Elvira, Don Carlo, Silva)	Conductor, opera house and orchestra	Label
1930	Antonio Melandri, Iva Pacetti, Gino Vanelli, Corrado Zambelli	Lorenzo Molajoli, Orchestra e Coro del Teatro alla Scala di Milano	78 rpm: Columbia GQX 10069-10073; LP: Cat: 4407
1950	Gino Penno, Caterina Mancini, Giuseppe Taddei, Giacomo Vaghi	Fernando Previtali, Orchestra Sinfonica e Coro di Roma della Rai	CD: Warner Fonit; Cat: 8573 82650-2
1957	Mario Del Monaco, Anita Cerquetti, Ettore Bastianini; Boris Christoff	Dimitri Mitropoulos, Orchestra e Coro del Maggio Musicale Fiorentino (Recording of a performance at the Maggio Musicale Fiorentino, Teatro Comunale, 14 June)	CD: Hr 4400; Cat: HR 4400/01
1962	Carlo Bergonzi, Leontyne Price, Cornell MacNeil, Giorgio Tozzi	Thomas Schippers, Metropolitan Opera Chorus and Orchestra (Recorded live 1 December 1962)	CD: FREQUENZ, Cat: 051-016
1967	Carlo Bergonzi, Leontyne Price, Mario Sereni, Ezio Flagello	Thomas Schippers, RCA Italiana Opera Chorus and Orchestra	CD: RCA Victor; Cat: GD 86503 (UK); 6503-2 (USA)
1968	Bruno Prevedi, Montserrat Caballé, Peter Glossop, Boris Christoff	Gianandrea Gavazzeni, RAI Symphony Orchestra and Chorus, Milan (Recording of 26 November 1968 which was broadcast on 25 March 1969)	CD: Opera d'Oro; Cat: OPD 7051 Grand Tier
1969	Plácido Domingo; Raina Kabaivanska; Carlo Meliciani; Nicolai Ghiaurov	Antonino Votto, Teatro alla Scala Orchestra and Chorus	CD: Opera D'Oro; Cat: ODO 1468
1983	Luciano Pavarotti; Leona Mitchell; Sherrill Milnes; Ruggero Raimondi	James Levine, Metropolitan Opera Orchestra and Chorus (Recorded live on 12 and 17 December)	DVD: Pioneer Classics; Cat: PC-99-102-D
1983	Plácido Domingo; Mirella Freni; Renato Bruson; Nicolai Ghiaurov	Riccardo Muti, Teatro alla Scala Orchestra and Chorus (Production by Luca Ronconi) (Recording of a performance in the Teatro alla Scala, 4 January)	DVD: Kultur Video; Cat: D72913
1987	Luciano Pavarotti; Joan Sutherland; Leo Nucci; Paata Burchuladze	Richard Bonynge, Orchestra and Chorus of Welsh National Opera	CD: Decca/London
2005	Marco Berti; Susan Neves; Carlo Guelfi; Giacomo Prestia	Antonello Allemandi, Teatro Regio di Parma (Production by Pier' Alli, Video direction by Matteo Ricchetti) (Audio and video recordings of a performance(s) May)	DVD: Dynamic 33496; University of Chicago Critical Edition
