= Luisa Maragliano =

Italian soprano

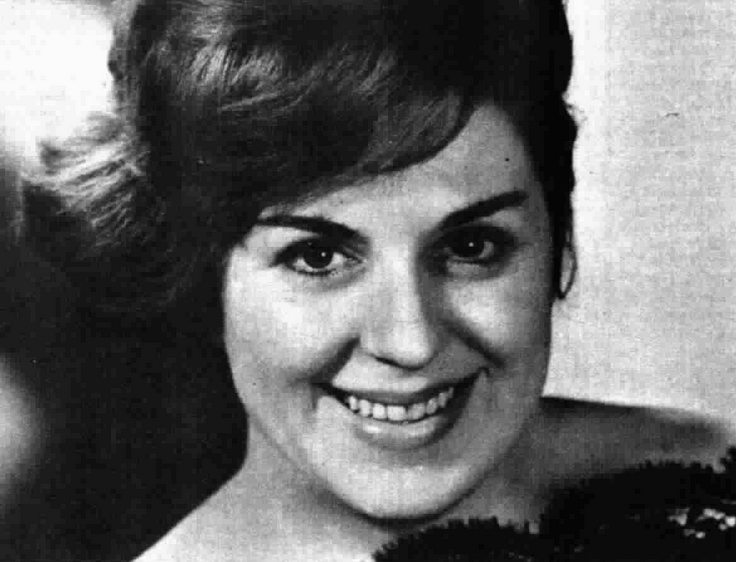
Luisa Maragliano

Luisa Maragliano (born in 1931) is an Italian soprano.

== Life ==
Maragliano began her career in 1955 after an audition at Teatro Carlo Felice in Genoa, where she was chosen by the conductor Tristano Illersberg as one of the Flower Maidens in Wagner's Parsifal.

Between 1957 and 1959, Maragliano began to impose herself on the Italian opera scene; particularly important was her debut in 1959, replacing Antonietta Stella, in La forza del destino at the Verona Arena, where she was a constant presence until the beginning of the 1970s.

Luisa Maragliano in 1959

She later sang in all major theatres around the world, including La Scala, the Teatro di San Carlo in Naples, the Teatro dell'Opera di Roma, the Wiener Staatsoper, the Metropolitan Opera, the Chicago Opera House, the Teatro Colón in Buenos Aires. The Neapolitan theatre is a favourite: among her numerous appearances are Simon Boccanegra in 1969 alongside Piero Cappuccilli in his debut role and Attila in 1971. Other important steps in her career are the opening of La Scala with Luisa Miller in 1969 (replacing Montserrat Caballé) and I masnadieri at the Maggio Musicale Fiorentino under the direction of Riccardo Muti.

She covers a wide repertoire ranging from Handel's Giulio Cesare to verismo, with a preference for Verdi's Aida in over 500 performances, as well as performing in Il trovatore, Un ballo in maschera, La traviata and in the already mentioned Luisa Miller and La forza del destino. She also interprets various titles of the first Verdi: Attila, I masnadieri, Nabucco, La battaglia di Legnano, I due Foscari, Ernani. From Puccini's repertoire, she performs La bohème, Manon Lescaut, Tosca, Madama Butterfly, Suor Angelica, Turandot (Liù), and works by other verismo composers such as Andrea Chénier, Cavalleria rusticana, and Francesca da Rimini.

== Recordings ==
- Aida, with Carlo Bergonzi, Fiorenza Cossotto, Aldo Protti, Nicolai Ghiaurov, dir. Francesco Molinari Pradelli - dal vivo Verona 1961 ed. Lyric Distribution
- Il trovatore, with Luigi Ottolini, Cornell MacNeil, Oralia Domínguez, dir. Fernando Previtali - dal vivo Buenos Aires 1963 ed. Opera Lovers
- I due Foscari, with Mario Zanasi, Renato Cioni, dir. Bruno Bartoletti - dal vivo Roma 1968 ed. MRF
- Luisa Miller, with Flaviano Labò, Cornell MacNeil, Nicola Rossi-Lemeni, Franca Mattiucci, dir. Bruno Bartoletti - dal vivo Buenos Aires 1968 ed. Opera Lovers
- Manon Lescaut, with Plácido Domingo, Alberto Rinaldi, Carlo Badioli, dir. Bruno Bartoletti - dal vivo Chicago 1968 ed. Opera Lovers
- I masnadieri, with Renato Cioni, Licinio Montefusco, Carlo Cava, dir. Riccardo Muti - dal vivo Firenze 1969 ed. Arkadia
- Luisa Miller, with Richard Tucker, Mario Zanasi, Paolo Washington, Adriana Lazzarini, Giovanni Foiani, dir. Francesco Molinari Pradelli - dal vivo La Scala 1969 ed. Curcio
- La bohème, with Franco Corelli, Giangiacomo Guelfi, Elvidia Ferracuti, Nicola Zaccaria, dir. Franco Mannino - dal vivo Macerata 1971 ed. Lyric Distribution/Opera Lovers
- Aida, with Franco Corelli, Maria Luisa Nave, Giampiero Mastromei, Agostino Ferrin, dir. Oliviero De Fabritiis - dal vivo Verona 1972 ed. Myto
- Attila, with Ruggero Raimondi, Renato Bruson, Bruno Prevedi, dir. Giuseppe Patanè - dal vivo Palermo 1972 ed. Charles Handelman
- Recital di Arie Verdiane ed. Dynamic
