= Teatro Lirico Sperimentale =

The Teatro Lirico Sperimentale di Spoleto was founded in 1947 by Adriano Belli, lawyer and musicologist, with the aim of helping young singers to start a career in opera, above all students who had already completed their singing studies and were gifted with artistic qualities, but had not yet made their artistic debut. The organization's offices are located in Spoleto, Italy.

== Singing competition ==
Winners of the singing competition at the "Sperimentale of Spoleto" attend a two years course where they are trained in several subjects not included in school programmes: preparation of opera, of course, but also training in stage movement under the guidance of the directors and conductors who will later put on the operas during the Debut Opera Season. There are three phases: in March the Competition for young singers of the European Community takes place, and the International Board of Examiners chooses the candidates. The winners will be the candidates that obtain an average mark of 8 out of 10. The following stage involves five months of training course aimed at the artistic debut of the students. During this time diction, mime, and acting courses are taught, together with vocal proficiency courses. In the last period of preparation, the singers study the roles chosen by the Artistic Director for their debut. The Opera Season is aimed to show the result of the training courses and is usually held in Spoleto in September. The operas to be performed are chosen on the basis of the students' vocal character, however for didactical reasons it is indispensable that students learn an opera from the sixteen/seventeenth century, one from the eighteenth century and one from the nineteenth century. Students receive a scholarship and live together in Spoleto.

=== Winners ===
Many great names on the international opera scene have won the Competition at the "Sperimentale", studied at Spoleto and made their debut in the Institution's Opera Season; for instance Cesare Valletti, Franco Corelli, Antonietta Stella, Anita Cerquetti, Giangiacomo Guelfi, Ettore Bastianini, Anna Moffo, Gabriella Tucci, Marcella Pobbe, Rolando Panerai, Margherita Rinaldi, Franco Bonisolli, Giorgio Merighi, Leo Nucci, Ruggero Raimondi, Renato Bruson, Mietta Sighele, Veriano Luchetti, Salvatore Fisichella and then Luciana D'Intino, Mariella Devia, Lucia Aliberti; in the last few years Marcello Giordani, Natale De Carolis, Giusy Devinu, Elisabeth Norberg-Schulz, Giuseppe Morino, Monica Bacelli, Roberto Frontali, Nuccia Focile, Giuseppe Sabbatini. More recently Roberto DeCandia, Sonia Ganassi, Norma Fantini, Manuela Kriscak, Nicola Ulivieri, Daniela Barcellona, Andrea Papi, Monica Colonna, Marina Comparato.

Musicians of the like of Lina Cuscinà, Vincenzo Bellezza, Franco Capuana, Ottavio Ziino, Nino Rota, Giuseppe Bertelli, Alberto Paoletti, Luigi Ricci, Rolando Nicolosi, Carlo Ventura, Fernando Cavaniglia collaborated in the past on teaching activities, while Riccardo Picozzi, Carlo Piccinato, Tatiana Pavlova, Attilia Radice taught acting and stage movement. More recently Anita Cerquetti, Enza Ferrari, Magda Olivero, Mietta Sighele, Gianpiero Taverna, Spiros Argiris, Massimo De Bernart, Giovanna Canetti, Bruno Aprea, Renato Bruson, Raina Kabaivanska have been involved in music courses. On more specific courses Carlo Bergonzi, Otto Edelman, Waldemar Kmentt, Renato Bruson, Natale De Carolis and Giovanna Canetti have collaborated on teaching activities. Stage movement and acting courses were held by Italo Nunziata, Paolo Baiocco, Alvaro Piccardi, Lucio Gabriele Dolcini, Stefano Vizioli, Stefano Monti, Daniela Malusardi, Henning Brockhaus.

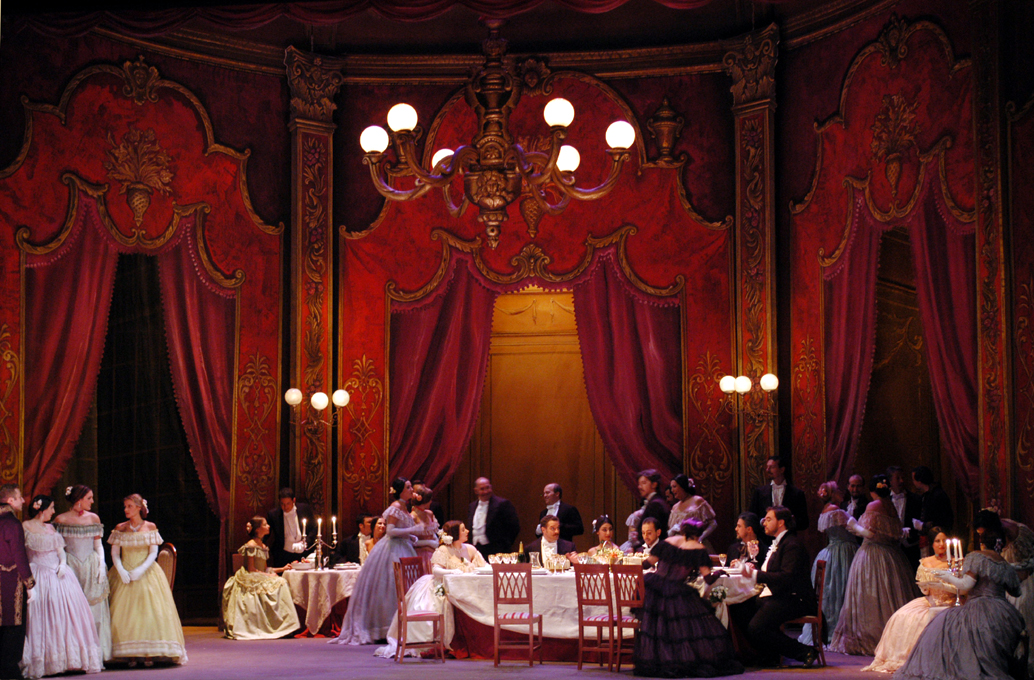
Teatro Nuovo

== Directors ==
Prestigious directors have worked at the "Sperimentale" during its Opera Seasons:

- Luca Ronconi (1994: Ligeia – Anacleto Morones),
- Ugo Gregoretti (1983 and 1995: L’Elisir d’amore – 1984: Il Barbiere di Siviglia),
- Gigi Proietti (1985: Don Pasquale – 1986: Le Nozze di Figaro),
- Giorgio Pressburger (1990: Il Pipistrello – 1993: Tragédie de Carmen – 1996: Perso per perso – L’Inganno Felice),
- Alvaro Piccardi (1987: Il Telefono – Mahagonny -1988: Così fan tutte – 1990: Morte dell’aria – Lighea - 1994: La Bella Verità - 1995: La Bohème),
- Giancarlo Cobelli (1984: Mavra – 1985: Orfeo ed Euridice – 1987: Il Mercato di Malmantile −1989: Simon Boccanegra – 1990: La Bohème),
- Sandro Sequi (1995: Il Matrimonio segreto),
- Piera Degli Esposti (1996: La Notte di un Nevrastenico – Suor Angelica - 1998: Le Parole al Buio),
- Stefano Monti (1996: Falstaff – 1998: Werther),
- Franco Ripa di Meana (1998: Don Giovanni – 1999: Le Nozze di Figaro),
- Henning Brockhaus (1999: Tosca – 2000: Midea2),
- Denis Krief (2001: Carmen),
- Pippo Delbono (2007: Obra Maestra),
- Paolo Rossi (2010: Il Matrimonio Segreto).

== Partnership theatres ==
The "Teatro Lirico Sperimentale" also collaborates with some of the major Italian opera theatres. In 1991 the production of La Cenerentola presented at the Spoleto Opera Season became part of the programme of the Rome Opera Season (Bruno Aprea conductor, Italo Nunziata director). In 1994 La Bella Verità was put on in collaboration with the Teatro Comunale di Firenze and was performed both at the Teatro Comunale di Firenze and the Teatro Caio Melisso in Spoleto, the collaboration continued through 1996 with the diptych Perso per perso and L'Inganno Felice by G. Rossini (Enrique Mazzola, conductor, Giorgio Pressburger, director). Presently the Teatro Lirico Sperimentale collaborates with the Teatro Comunale di Bologna and with the Stadttheater Klagenfurt, Teatro dell'Opera of Roma, Arena Sferisterio of Macerata, Teatro Nazionale of Rome (Midea 2 by Oscar Strasnoy, 2001).

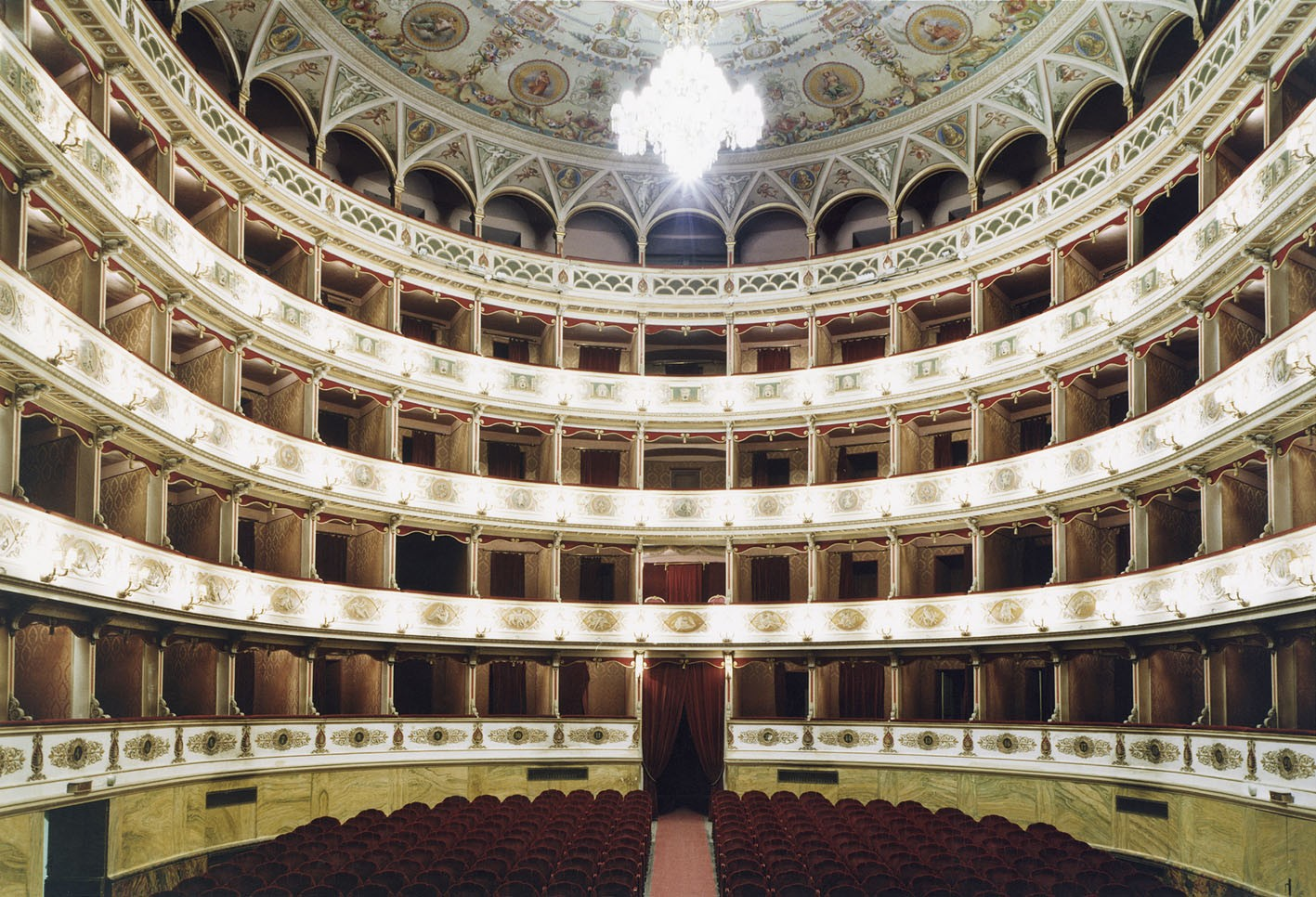
Teatro Nuovo

In the last years the Teatro Lirico Sperimentale has gone further afield in teaching and in music training by organising, together with the Region of Umbria, the Province of Perugia and the European Social Fund, courses for accompanists, for piano technicians and for tuners. The "Sperimentale" organises also since 1993 the "Orpheus" International Competition for New Chamber Operas, dedicated to Luciano Berio, who was president of the International Jury since the first edition. The winning composition will have its world première in Spoleto in September during the Opera Season.

In 1995 the "Teatro Lirico Sperimentale", after the first Training Course for Orchestra Players, has also given life to the OTLiS (Orchestra of the Teatro Lirico Sperimentale di Spoleto). Young musicians chosen through a national selection, attend a two-month course in Spoleto under the guidance of highly qualified teachers (Francesco Manara, Luciano Giuliani, Paolo Centurioni, Angelo Persichilli, Umberto Benedetti Michelangeli, Spiros Argiris, Massimiliano Stefanelli, Romolo Gessi, Carlo Palleschi, Massimo De Bernart, Bruno Aprea) and are then selected again in order to form, with other young and established musicians, the orchestra that plays during the Opera Season in Spoleto and in the following Regional Opera Season (Perugia, Terni, Assisi, Todi, Città di Castello).

The Orchestra also performed at several symphony concerts and at the opening night of the First World Military Games – Olympic Stadium, Rome, 1995. The courses for Orchestra Players, organised in collaboration with the Region of Umbria and the European Social Fund, since 1996 are now open to young musicians of the European Community.

In 1992 the Institution was awarded the "Caleidoscopio" Prize from the European Community's Commission for Culture and in 1994 the prestigious "Premio Abbiati" from the Italian Music Critics for "the assiduous contribution to the training of new performers and for the creation and setting up of the "Orpheus International Competition"". In 1999 the production of Don Giovanni staged in the 1998 Opera Season was awarded with the Premio PierLuigi Samaritani for the scenes designed by Roberta Lazzeri. In 2001 the National Association of Italian Music Critics has awarded the Abbiati Prize of the critics to Denis Krief for the direction of Carmen, that the French director has signed for the Teatro Lirico Sperimentale in 2000 Opera Season. In 2001 the Teatro Lirico Sperimentale has realized an important project on an international scale: the re-elaboration and orchestral transcription of Bach's

The Art of Fugue, coordinated by Luciano Berio. This activity was approved and co-financed by the European Commission and recognized as a "Special European Event". The project foresaw five performances in four countries – Italy, France, the Netherlands and England – with an orchestral ensemble of 40 elements coming from some of the most important European musical academies: the Conservatorio “G. Verdi” of Turin, the Conservatoire National Supérieur de Musique et Danse of Lyon, the Koninklijk Conservatorium of The Hague, the Hochschule für Musik und Theater of Leipzig, the Guildahll School of Music and Drama of London. The importance of the project on an international scale has been determined also by the direct involvement in the executive realization of composers renowned in Europe, such as Luis De Pablo, Louis Andriessen, Betsy Jolas, Gilberto Bosco, Aldo Clementi, Fabio Nieder, Michele Tadini and Fabio Vacchi. The Teatro Lirico Sperimentale was guest with concerts and operas in:

- Italy,
- Austria (Vienna 1994),
- Spain (Barcelona 1996),
- United States (New York 1996 and 2009, Los Angeles 2005),
- Switzerland (Bern, 1996),
- Canada (Vancouver 2002, Toronto 2010),
- Hungary (Budapest 2002 and 2006, Miskolc 2006),
- Germany (Schwetzingen 2003 and 2010, Salzau 2005),
- Poland (Tczew 2003),
- China (Beijing 2004, 2006 and 2010, Tangshan 2004, Shenyang 2006, Xi'an and Nanjin 2010, Shanghai 2010 and 2012),
- Japan (Osaka, Tokyo, Sapporo, Ina, Hiroshima, Kobe, Nagoya, Oita, Morioka, Matsudo, Fukuoka, Tokorozawa, Chigasaki, Musashino 2000, 2002, 2004, 2005, 2007, 2008),
- Russia (St. Petersburg 2006, 2008, 2009, 2010, 2011, 2012, 2013),
- Qatar (Doha 2007, 2008),
- Romania (Bucharest, Sibiu 2007, 2008, 2009, 2010),
- Cuba (Havana 2008),
- Turkey (Istanbul 2010, Istanbul and Bursa 2011),
- South Africa (Pretoria 2010),
- United Kingdom (London 2011),
- Netherlands (Utrecht 2012).
