= Lucilla Udovich =

American soprano

- Lucilla Udovich (photo with 1959 dedication)
- Occupation: opera soprano singer

Lucilla Udovich (September 7, 1930 – September 23, 1999) was an American soprano of Croatian ancestry.

== Life story ==
=== Early years ===
Udovich was born in Denver, Colorado, and grew up in California. She studied singing, violin, piano and solfeggio at the Community Music School in San Francisco, later continuing her studies in New York at Columbia University and Hunter College. During this period Udovich sang church music and appeared in musical comedies.

=== Italian career ===
She appeared in a series of concerts around Milan, and then moved to Rome, where she remained for the rest of her life. Beniamino Gigli invited her to perform with him in one of his last concert tours in Italy. Udovich made her opera debut in Agnese di Hohenstaufen by Spontini in 1954 at the Maggio Musicale Fiorentino with Franco Corelli and Giangiacomo Guelfi, conducted by Vittorio Gui. She inaugurated a second festival with Antigone by the baroque composer Tommaso Traetta.

She made other appearances with the Santa Cecilia Orchestra in Bartók's A Kekszakallu Herceg Vara, in Verdi's Requiem, and Rossini's Petite messe solennelle; with the RAI Orchestra in Benjamin Britten's Peter Grimes and War Requiem, and Schönberg's Gurre-Lieder. Udovich performed at the Rome Opera, Teatro Comunale in Florence, Teatro la Fenice in Venice, and the Teatro San Carlo in Naples. At the Glyndebourne Festival Opera she sang Elettra in Mozart’s Idomeneo. She was invited to Torre del Lago for the 100th anniversary of Puccini's birth. She is best remembered for a performance of Turandot with Franco Corelli telecast by RAI in 1958.

Her career was halted due to back problems. She died in Rome at age 69.

=== Outside Italy ===
Outside Italy, Udovich performed in Buenos Aires, Mexico City, Barcelona, Split, Zagreb, Ankara, Tel Aviv, Oslo, Dublin, Paris and London. Her American appearances included San Francisco, Los Angeles, Pittsburgh, New Orleans, and Houston.

== Recordings ==
- Spontini: Agnese di Hohenstaufen with Franco Corelli, Giangiacomo Guelfi, conducted by Vittorio Gui
- Puccini: Turandot with Franco Corelli conducted by Fernando Previtali.
