= Vittorio Gui =

Italian composer (1885–1975)

- Born: September 14, 1885; Rome
- Died: October 16, 1975 (aged 90); Florence
- Occupations: Conductor, composer, musicologist and critic

Vittorio Gui (14 September 1885 – 16 October 1975) was an Italian conductor, composer, musicologist and critic.

== Biography ==
Gui was born in Rome in 1885. He graduated in humanities at the University of Rome and also studied composition at the Accademia Nazionale di Santa Cecilia; his principal composition teachers were the noted composers Giacomo Setaccioli and Stanislao Falchi. His style was "impressionistic with characteristic Italian traits".

Gui's opera David premiered in Rome in 1907; later that year, he made his professional conducting debut at the Teatro Adriano in Rome, leading Ponchielli's La Gioconda as a substitute. This led to invitations to conduct in Naples and Turin (he met Claude Debussy in Turin in 1911). In 1923, Arturo Toscanini invited him to conduct Salome by Richard Strauss as the season opener at La Scala in Milan. He conducted the Teatro Regio in Turin from 1925 to 1927; in his last year in Turin, he premiered his fairy-tale opera Fata Malerba there. (Other notable compositions included the cantata Cantico dei cantici ("Song of Songs") from 1921, and the symphonic poem Giulietta e Romeo (with voices, from 1902).)

In 1928, Gui founded and conducted the Orchestra Stabile; he developed the organization of the orchestra into the 1933 Maggio Musicale Fiorentino or "Florence May Music Festival", which he led until 1943. At the festival he conducted unusual operas such as Verdi's Luisa Miller, Spontini's La vestale, Cherubini's Médée and Gluck's Armide.

In 1933 Bruno Walter invited Gui to be guest conductor at the Salzburg Festival, and in 1936 Sir Thomas Beecham invited him to be a regular conductor at the Royal Opera House at Covent Garden. He spent World War II in Britain. In 1948, he made his debut with the Glyndebourne Festival company, leading Mozart's Così fan tutte in the Carl Ebert production at the Edinburgh Festival. He served as the Glyndebourne Festival's Musical Director from 1951 to 1963, and as its "artistic counselor" from 1963 to 1965, when he made his last appearances there.

Gui was particularly known for his conducting of the works of Brahms, of which he was said to be a leading conductor in Italy. In 1947, the 50th anniversary of Brahms's death, Gui conducted a complete cycle of Brahms's orchestral and choral works in that country. He was also known for conducting contemporary music and first performances; among works he premiered was Dallapiccola's first major composition, his Partita, in 1933.

Vittorio Gui was also a prolific author and critic. Notable writings include his 1924 study of Boito's opera Nerone, an article on "Mozart in Italy" from 1955, and his collected essays, Battute d'aspetto (1946).

Gui died in Florence in 1975, aged 90.

== Recordings ==
Numerous recordings survive of Gui's work either from the studio or as airchecks, including the last two Brahms symphonies and some Mozart symphonies, and numerous operatic performances. Among others, his 1949 recording of Verdi's opera A Masked Ball has been reissued on CD, as has his 1950 performance of Wagner's Parsifal with Maria Callas. His 1952 performance of Bellini's Norma with Callas on EMI is particularly prized, as is his pioneering 1937 complete recording of the opera with Gina Cigna in the title role and Ebe Stignani as Adalgisa, made in Turin. His 1962 Abbey Road Studio-1 stereo recording by the Royal Philharmonic Orchestra of Rossini's The Barber of Seville has been released on the Great Recordings of the Century by EMI. There is also a recording of The Marriage of Figaro from Glyndebourne on EMI, with Sena Jurinac as the Contessa.

In 1954 he conducted Spontini's Agnes von Hohenstaufen at the Maggio Musicale Fiorentino with Franco Corelli, Lucilla Udovich and Giangiacomo Guelfi.

Cultural offices
Preceded by Fritz Busch	Musical Directors, Glyndebourne Opera Festival; 1951–1963	Succeeded by John Pritchard
