= Flaviano Labò =

Italian opera singer (1927–1991)

Flaviano Labò (photo with 1959 dedication)

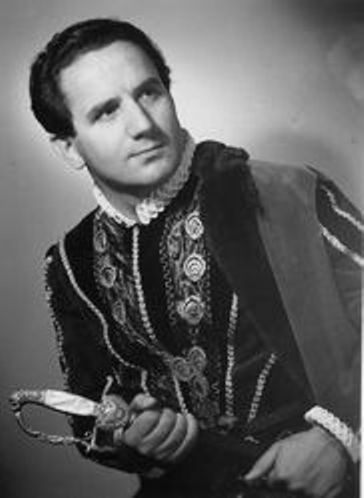
Flaviano Labò

Flaviano Labò (February 1, 1927 – February 13, 1991) was an Italian operatic tenor, particularly associated with heroic roles of the Italian repertory.

Labò was born at Borgonovo Val Tidone, near Piacenza. While in the army, he came to the notice of the conductor Antonino Votto, and subsequently studied with Ettore Campogalliani in Parma, Renato Pastorino in Milan and Valentino Metti in Piacenza. He made his stage debut at the Teatro Municipale in Piacenza, as Cavaradossi in Tosca, in 1954.

He quickly sang widely in Italy and various European opera houses, as well as in South America, before making his debut on November 29, 1957, at the Metropolitan Opera in New York, as Alvaro in La forza del destino, where he sang thirteen roles in eight seasons, including Alfredo in La traviata, Manrico in Il trovatore, and Radamès in Aïda. In 1959, he sang at the New York City Opera as Calaf in Puccini's Turandot (conducted by Julius Rudel) and Rodolfo in La bohème (opposite Chester Ludgin as Marcello). He also appeared at the San Francisco Opera, and the opera houses of Philadelphia, Houston, and New Orleans.

Other important debuts were at the Royal Opera House in London, and the Palais Garnier in Paris, both as Radamès in Aïda in 1959. He first sang at La Scala in Milan, in the title role of Don Carlos, in 1960. He appeared at the Maggio Musicale Fiorentino in 1967, as Gualtiero in Il pirata, opposite Montserrat Caballé, and was a regular guest at the Verona Arena. He also made guest appearances at the Vienna State Opera, the Zurich Opera, the Teatro Nacional Sao Carlos in Lisbon, and the Teatro Colón in Buenos Aires.

Labò was admired for his robust, typically Italianate voice, and his direct unaffected manner, other notable roles included Macduff in Verdi's Macbeth, Enzo in La Gioconda, and Turiddu in Mascagni's Cavalleria rusticana. His last performance was in Turin, as Ismaele in Nabucco, in 1987. He died in an automobile accident caused by fog in Milan at the age of 64.

He made relatively few recordings, but can be heard in a complete Don Carlos, opposite Antonietta Stella, Ettore Bastianini, Boris Christoff, for Deutsche Grammophon, in 1960. He also recorded excerpts of Manon Lescaut, opposite Anna Moffo, for RCA, in 1963. Among his "pirated" recordings is a 1958 performance of Aida in Mexico City, with Anita Cerquetti, Nell Rankin, Cornell MacNeil, Fernando Corena, and Norman Treigle.

== Sources ==
- Operissimo.com
