= Mario Zafred =

Italian composer

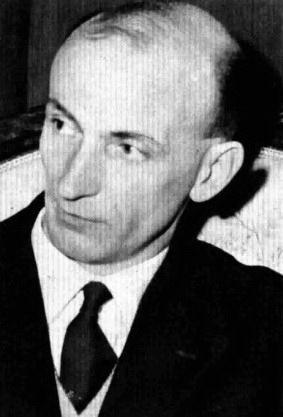
Image of Mario Zafred

Mario Zafred (2 March 1922 Trieste – 22 May 1987 Rome) was an Italian composer, music critic, and opera director. He also served as the president of various Italian music conservatories including the Accademia Nazionale di Santa Cecilia.

== Biography ==
Zafred began his music studies in Venice under Gian Francesco Malipiero before attending the Accademia Nazionale di Santa Cecilia in Rome. After graduating in 1944 with a diploma in music composition he continued to study further under Ildebrando Pizzetti. In 1947 he moved to Paris where he continued to study composition for two years.

After returning to Italy in 1949, Zafred began a successful career as a music critic, working first for L’unità (1949–56) and La Giustizia (1956–63). In 1966 he became artistic director of the Teatro Comunale Giuseppe Verdi in Trieste. He left that house in 1968 to become the artistic director of the Rome Opera where he stayed until he became the director of the Teatro Lirico Sperimentale, Spoleto in 1974. In 1973 he was appointed president of the Accademia Nazionale di Santa Cecilia, where he stayed until he became president of the Sindacato Nazionale Musicisti in 1983. In 1985 he was appointed honorary president of both the Fondazione Arts Academy and the Istituzione Sinfonica di Roma.

== Compositions ==
Zafred enjoyed a considerable amount of success as a composer in Italy, winning numerous prizes for composition including the Premio Marzotto (1956), the Sibelius prize (1959) and the City of Treviso prize (1963). His career focused mostly on writing symphonic works, including seven symphonies, three large works for chorus and orchestra, and numerous concertos and sinfoniettas. He also composed a moderate amount of chamber music works including four string quartets, three piano trios, three sonatas, a wind quintet, and a serenata, among others. His output for solo instrument is confined to only a few pieces for the piano. Although, Zafred did not compose much vocal music he did create two fairly successful operas, Amleto (1961) and Wallenstein (1965). His other vocal works consist of a handful of art songs for solo voice and piano with the exception of one piece for voice, piano, and flute.

Zafred’s musical language developed from an early avant-garde manner to something increasingly simple and accessible. His vast, generally uniform output is rooted in counterpoint (sometimes 12-tone), the free use of classical forms, and the avoidance of an excessively intellectual approach in favour of fluid musical argument. A personal style of solid craftsmanship reveals the influences of Pizzetti, especially in the early works and the operas, and of Bartók in the elaboration of Istrian folk melodies in his mature works.

== Selected works ==
Zafred's compositions are published by Ricordi, Boccaccini & Spada and Suvini Zerboni.

- Concerto for viola and orchestra (1957)
- Elegia in tre tempi for viola and orchestra (1965)
- Invenzioni for violin, viola and orchestra (1966)
- Sonata in tre tempi for viola solo (1970)
