= Giulietta Simionato =

Italian opera singer

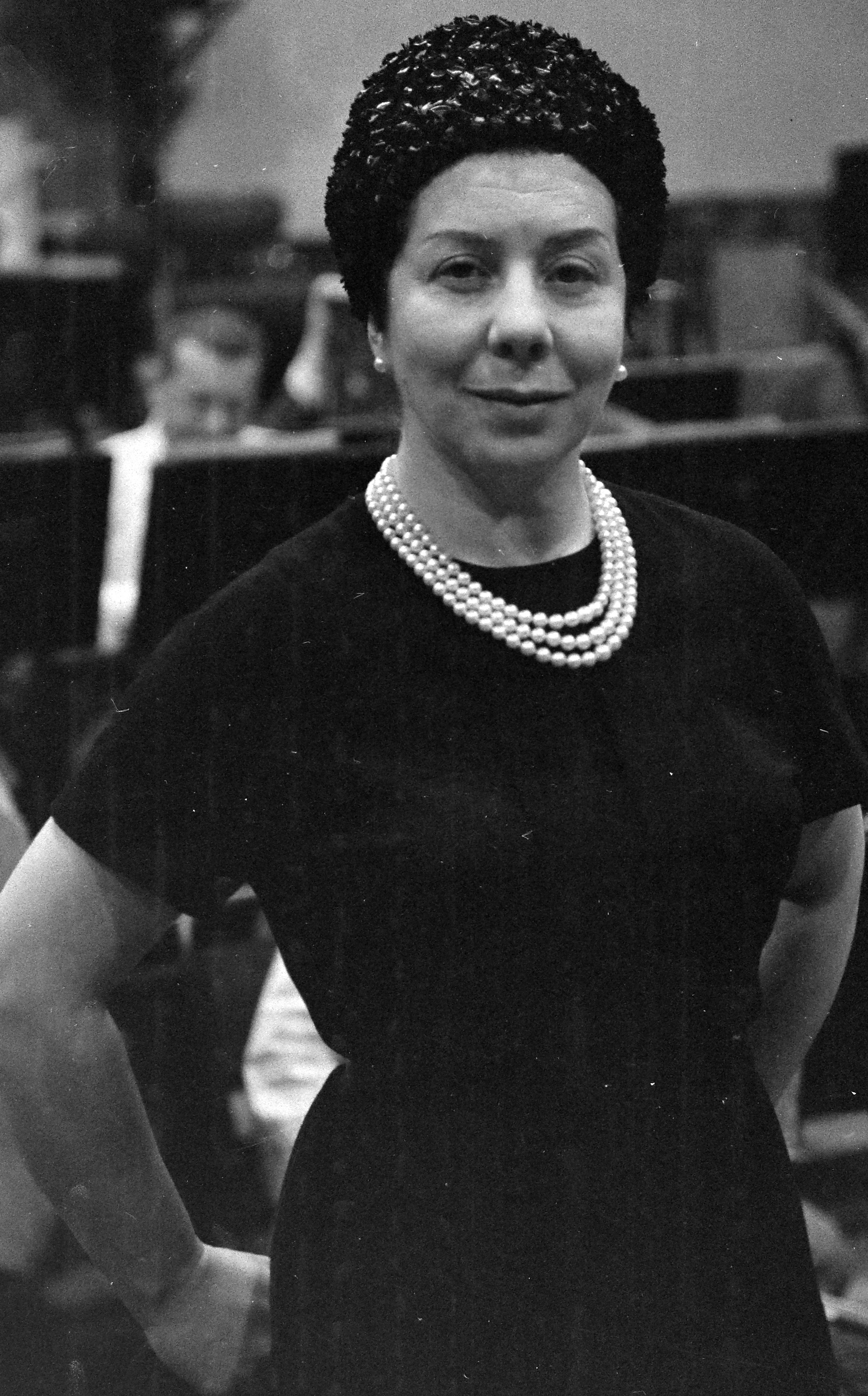
Simionato in 1962

Giulietta Simionato (born Giulia Simionato; Forlì, Romagna, 12 May 1910 – Rome, 5 May 2010) was an Italian mezzo-soprano. Her career spanned the period from the 1930s until her retirement in 1966.

== Life ==
Giulietta Simionato in Mignon, Teatro alla Scala, Milan, 1948 (photo with dedication).

As a girl she studied in a boarding school with nuns who sensed her musical qualities and invited her to study singing, which she did against the opposition of the family, especially her mother. After the latter's death, Giulietta studied first in Rovigo, then in Padua. Her singing debut was in the 1927 musical comedy Nina, Don't Be Stupid (Nina, non far la stupida) with music by Giovanni Capodivacca (Gian Capo) and lyrics by Arturo Rossato. The following year she made her operatic debut at Montagnana. In 1933 she won the first "bel canto competition" in Florence against 385 competitors and got an audition at the Teatro alla Scala, Milan. The result was positive, but the artistic director Fabbroni found her voice still immature and invited her to return a few years later. Two years later she was put under contract. In 1928 she sang in Verdi's Rigoletto. The first fifteen years of her career were frustrating, it seems because she was not supported by the fascist regime. She was only given minor roles and her career struggled to take off, but by the late 1940s she had attracted growing attention. In 1936, she had made her debut at La Scala and appeared there regularly between 1936 and 1966. By then, Simionato was recognised as one of the most respected singers of her generation. She had made her debut at the Royal Opera House, Covent Garden in 1953, where she likewise appeared regularly between 1963 and 1965.

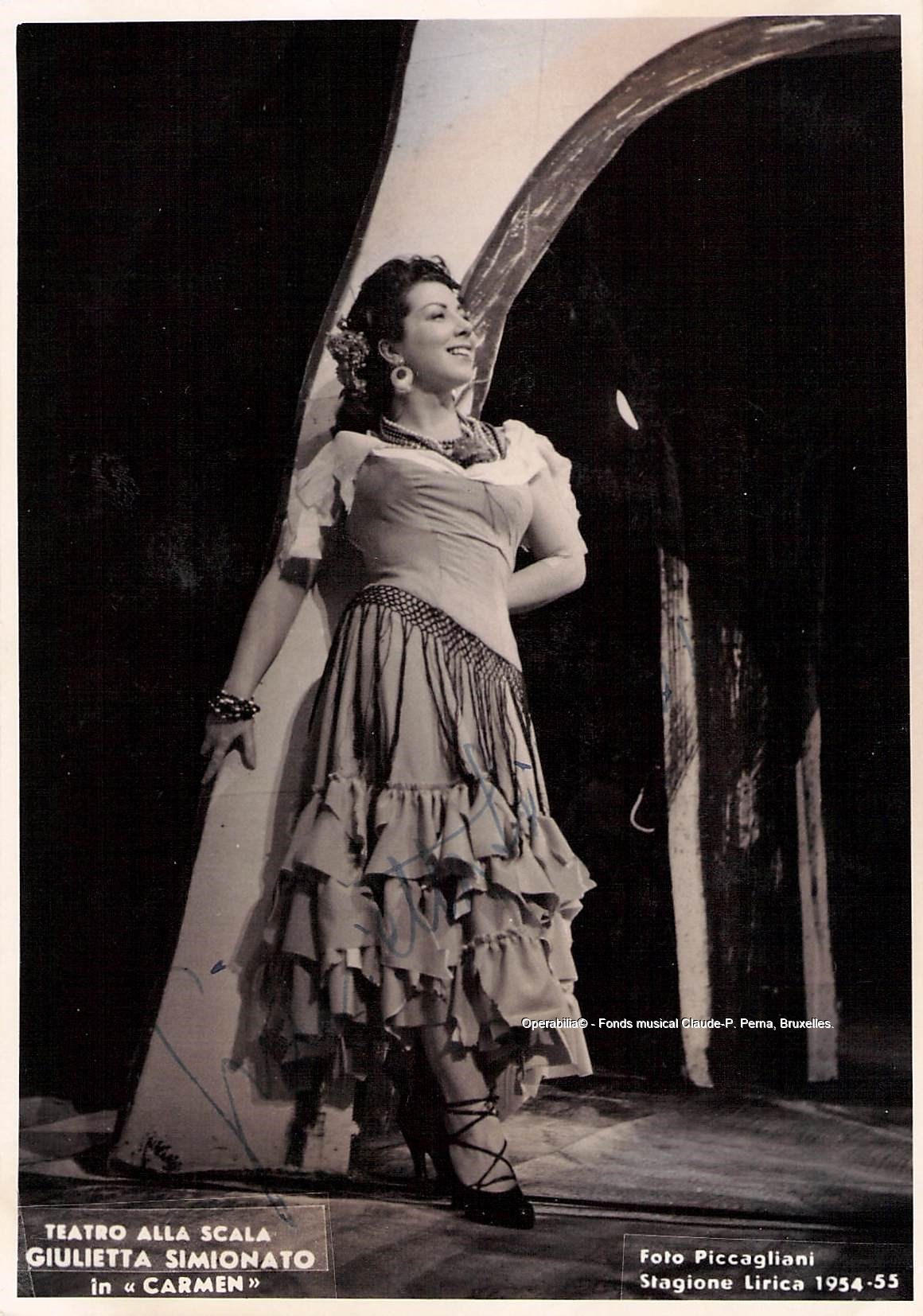
Simionato as Carmen, Scala 1954 Photo: Erio Piccagliani

Simionato made her United States opera debut in 1953 as Charlotte in Jules Massenet's Werther at the San Francisco Opera with Cesare Valletti in the title role. In 1959 she made her debut at the Metropolitan Opera, as Azucena in Il Trovatore, with Carlo Bergonzi, Antonietta Stella, and Leonard Warren. Simionato also appeared at the Edinburgh Festival (1947), the San Francisco Opera (1953), the Teatro Nacional de São Carlos (1954), the Lyric Opera of Chicago (1954–1961), the Vienna State Opera (from 1956), and the Salzburg Festival. In 1957, she sang in Anna Bolena with Maria Callas. In 1961, she withdrew from three performances at the Metropolitan Opera, with Trigeminal Neuralgia.

Simionato had a large repertory including Rossini's Rosina and Cinderella, Charlotte in Werther, and Carmen. She also excelled in the Verdian repertoire, as Amneris, Eboli and Azucena, and as Santuzza in Mascagni's Cavalleria rusticana.

She was a major recording artist, and in addition many of her performances gained live radio broadcast or were captured on film. Fono has gathered her recordings on the CD, The Color of a Voice. She retired in 1966, and married Dr. Cesare Frugoni.

She continued to inspire admiration through teaching and various directorial positions, with amazing vitality even in her 90s. She was featured in Daniel Schmid's award-winning 1984 documentary film Il Bacio di Tosca (Tosca's Kiss) about a home for retired opera singers founded by Giuseppe Verdi. She also appeared in an interview by Stefan Zucker in Jan Schmidt-Garre's 1999 film, Opera Fanatic.

She died in Rome at age 99, exactly one week before her 100th. birthday.

== Selected recordings ==
Selected recordings:

Year	Composer – Opera (role)	Cast, Orchestra, Chorus and Conductor	Label
1940	Pietro Mascagni – Cavalleria Rusticana (Lucia)	Lina Bruna Rasa (Santuzza), Beniamino Gigli (Turiddu), Gino Bechi (Alfio); Chorus and Orchestra of Teatro alla Scala; Pietro Mascagni	CD: Pearl GEMM CDS 9288 (+Pagliacci), Naxos Historical 8.110714-15 (+excerpts) (2001)
1954	Georges Bizet – Carmen (Carmen)	Nicolai Gedda (Jose), Hilde Güden (Micaela), Michel Roux (Escamillo); Wiener Symphoniker, Wiener Singerverein; Herbert von Karajan; Recording of a concert performance (8 October 1954)	CD: Andante; AN 3100 (2005)
1954	Giuseppe Verdi – Rigoletto (Maddalena)	Aldo Protti (Rigoletto), Hilde Güden (Gilda), Mario del Monaco (Duca di Mantova), Cesare Siepi (Sparafucile); Chorus and Orchestra of Santa Cecilia; Alberto Erede	CD: Decca; 440 242-2 (1994)
1955	Giuseppe Verdi – La Forza del Destino (Preziosilla)	Mario del Monaco (Alvaro), Renata Tebaldi (Leonora), Ettore Bastianini (Don Carlo), Cesare Siepi (Padre Guardiano), Fernando Corena (Fra Melitone); Chorus and Orchestra of Santa Cecilia; Alberto Erede	CD: Decca Originals; 475 8681 (2007)
1956	Giuseppe Verdi – Il Trovatore (Azucena)	Mario del Monaco (Manrico), Renata Tebaldi (Leonora), Ugo Savarese (Conte di Luna); Grand Théâtre de Genève, Maggio Musicale Fiorentino; Alberto Erede	CD: Decca 470 589–2 (2002)
1957	Gaetano Donizetti – Anna Bolena (Giovanna Seymour)	Maria Callas (Anna Bolena), Nicola Rossi-Lemeni (Enrico VIII), Gianni Raimondi (Percy), Gabriella Carturan (Smeton); Orchestra e Coro del Teatro alla Scala di Milano; Nino Sanzogno; Recording of a performance broadcast (14 July 1957)	CD: Warner Classics 190295844592 (2017)
1957	Giuseppe Verdi – La Forza del Destino (Preziosilla)	Pier Miranda Ferraro (Alvaro), Anita Cerquetti (Leonora), Aldo Protti (Don Carlo), Boris Christoff (Padre Guardiano), Renato Capecchi (Fra Melitone); Chorus and Orchestra of RAI Roma; Nino Sanzogno; Recording of a performance broadcast (29 September 1957)	CD: Bongiovanni GAO 174–176 (1995), Myto 3MCD 992 203 (1999)
1957	Giuseppe Verdi – Un Ballo in Maschera (Ulrica)	Maria Callas (Amelia), Giuseppe di Stefano (Riccardo), Ettore Bastianini (Renato); Orchestra e Coro del Teatro alla Scala di Milano; Gianandrea Gavazzeni; Recording of a performance (7 December 1957)	CD: EMI Classics 5679182 (2002)
1959	Giuseppe Verdi – Aida (Amneris)	Carlo Bergonzi (Radames), Renata Tebaldi (Aida), Cornell MacNeil (Amonasro); Wiener Philharmoniker, Wiener Singerverein; Herbert von Karajan	CD: Decca Legends; 460 978-2 (1999)
1960	Giuseppe Verdi – La Forza del Destino (Preziosilla)	Giuseppe di Stefano (Alvaro), Antonietta Stella (Leonora), Ettore Bastianini (Don Carlo), Walter Kreppel (Padre Guardiano), Karl Dönch (Fra Melitone); Chorus and Orchestra of Wiener Philharmoniker; Dimitri Mitropoulos; Recording of a performance at the Vienna State Opera (23 September 1960). The overture is played between Acts 1 and 2.	CD: Myto 2MCD 004 228 (2000), Orfeo C 681 0621 (2007)
1960	Pietro Mascagni – Cavalleria Rusticana (Santuzza)	Mario del Monaco (Turiddu), Cornell MacNeil (Alfio); Chorus and Orchestra of Santa Cecilia; Tullio Serafin	CD: Decca; 467 484-2 (+Pagliacci) (2002)
1962	Giuseppe Verdi – Il Trovatore (Azucena)	Franco Corelli (Manrico), Leontyne Price (Leonora), Ettore Bastianini (Conte di Luna); Chorus of the Wiener Staatsoper, Wiener Philharmoniker; Herbert von Karajan; Recording of a performance at Salzburg (31 July 1962)	CD: DG 447 659-2 (1995)
1964	Giuseppe Verdi – Il Trovatore (Azucena)	Franco Corelli (Manrico), Gabriella Tucci (Leonora), Robert Merrill (Conte di Luna); Chorus and Orchestra of Teatro dell'Opera di Roma; Thomas Schippers	CD: HMV Classics; HMVD 5 73413-2 (1999)
