= Teatro Lirico =

Teatro Lirico may refer to:

- Teatro Lirico (Milan) (formerly Teatro alla Canobbiana) in Milan, Italy
- Teatro Lirico di Cagliari in Cagliari, Sardinia, Italy
- Teatro Lirico Sperimentale in Spoleto, Italy
- Teatro Lirico Giuseppe Verdi in Trieste, Italy
