= Ettore Bastianini =

Italian operatic baritone (1922-1967)

- Ettore Bastianini (photo with dedication)
- Occupation: opera singer

Ettore Bastianini (24 September 1922 – 25 January 1967) was an Italian operatic baritone who was particularly associated with the operas of the bel canto tradition.

== Early training and career as a bass ==
Born in Siena, Bastianini first began performing at fifteen while apprenticed to a pastry chef, Gaetano Vanni, who discovered his vocal talent and encouraged him to join the choir of his hometown's cathedral. Between 1937 and 1938, he sang bass during Masses and religious functions at the church. In 1939 he began singing lessons under Fathima and Anselmo Ammanati, who continued training him as a bass. He sang his first professional concerts in 1940 and 1941 in Asciano and Siena at the Fortezza Medicea and Teatro dei Rozzi. In 1942 he won first prize in the 6th National Singing Contest at the Teatro Comunale, Florence, but was soon drafted into the Italian Air Force which prevented him from immediately enjoying the scholarship accompanying the prize.

After serving in the Italian Air Force between 1943 and 1944 toward the end of World War II, Bastianini resumed his career. On 28 January 1945, in a Siena concert, he sang the bass arias "Vecchia zimarra" from Puccini's La bohème and "La calunnia è un venticello" from Rossini's Il barbiere di Siviglia. That November, he made his operatic debut as Colline in La bohème at the Teatro Alighieri in Ravenna. His only son, Jago, was born in 1945.

In 1946, Bastianini was finally able to enjoy the scholarship he'd won four years earlier and began studying at the Teatro Comunale, Florence. He sang in recitals there alongside other future opera greats like Mirto Picchi, Fedora Barbieri and Rolando Panerai. That same year, he appeared in numerous operas with smaller Italian opera houses such as the Teatro Verdi in Florence. Among his roles that year were his first performances of Zio Bonzo in Madama Butterfly, Don Basilio in Il barbiere di Siviglia and Sparafucile in Rigoletto.

In 1947, Bastianini toured Egypt, singing in Cairo, Alexandria and Giza, sharing the stage with baritone Gino Bechi and soprano Maria Caniglia, reprising the roles of Don Basilio and Sparafucile. He also sang Raimondo in Lucia di Lammermoor. He then spent the next year singing the bass repertoire in opera houses throughout Italy, including the Teatro Regio di Parma and Teatro Comunale di Bologna. On 24 April 1948, he made his La Scala debut as Teiresias in Stravinsky's Oedipus Rex. In 1949, he toured Egypt again and flew to Caracas, Venezuela to sing in productions of Aida (Ramfis), La bohème, Lucia di Lammermoor and Rigoletto.

Bastianini gave his first broadcast recital for the Italian Radio on 29 December 1950. Earlier that year, he had toured Egypt again and appeared in operas in Italy. He toured Egypt once more, just before returning to Italy for his final bass performance in April 1951 at Turin's Teatro Alfieri as Colline. Believing his voice was better suited to the baritone repertoire and encouraged by his teacher, Luciano Bettarini, Bastianini left the stage for seven months, studying and re-training his vocal instrument.

== Career as a baritone ==
Ettore Bastianini as Renato in Un ballo in maschera, Teatro Comunale, Florence, 1950s.

=== Triumph on the international stage: 1952–1957 ===
Bastianini made his debut as a baritone on 17 January 1952, in Siena, as Giorgio Germont in Verdi's La traviata. His performance was not well received, and he left the stage again for a brief period of intense vocal exercise to secure the top of his voice. Upon his return just weeks later, he sang Rigoletto in Siena with success. This was followed by Amonasro in Pescara and a return to the role of Germont in Bologna, with Virginia Zeani as Violetta. He also gave several performances at the Maggio Musicale Fiorentino, including both Count Tomsky (spring 1952) and Prince Yeletsky (spring 1954) in Tchaikovsky's The Queen of Spades, Prince Andrei Bolkonsky in Prokofiev's War and Peace (spring 1953), and the title role in Tchaikovsky's Mazeppa (1954).

In 1953, Bastianini performed opposite Maria Callas in the first of many pairings with her, as Enrico Ashton in Lucia di Lammermoor at the Teatro Comunale Florence. That same year he sang the role of Carlo Gérard in Umberto Giordano's Andrea Chénier for the first time at the Teatro Regio di Torino. He made his Metropolitan Opera debut as Germont on 5 December 1953, opposite Licia Albanese as Violetta and Richard Tucker as Alfredo. The following January, he sang Enrico to Lily Pons's Lucia and Jan Peerce's Edgardo at the Met. On 10 May 1954 he made his debut as a baritone at La Scala, in the title role of Tchaikovsky's Eugene Onegin, with Renata Tebaldi as Tatyana.

In fall 1954, Bastianini joined the roster of the Metropolitan Opera and sang there regularly through May 1957. His roles at the Met during this time included Amonasro in Aida, Carlo Gérard, Conte di Luna in Il trovatore, Enrico, Germont, Marcello in La bohème, Escamillo in Carmen, Rodrigo in Don Carlo and the title role in Rigoletto. He later returned to the Met in spring 1960 in several roles, including Don Carlo di Vargas in La forza del destino (which he had recorded superbly under Molinari-Pradelli in 1956 for Decca Records, followed a few years later by an electrifying portrayal of the villain Barnaba in La Gioconda under Gavazzeni on the same label). He returned to the Met again in January 1965, where he spent most of that year singing in several of his prior roles with the company and portraying Scarpia in Tosca. His 87th and final performance at the Met was as Rodrigo on 11 December 1965. It was also, coincidentally, the last performance of his career.

While performing regularly at the Met during the mid-1950s, Bastianini continued to perform occasionally in Europe and in other opera houses in the United States. On 28 May 1955, he appeared opposite Maria Callas and Giuseppe di Stefano in a famous La Scala production of La traviata, directed by Luchino Visconti and conducted by Carlo Maria Giulini. The following summer he made the first of several recordings for Decca Records: Alphonse XI in La favorita and (as cited above) Don Carlo di Vargas in La forza del destino. On 31 October 1955 (opening night), he debuted with the Lyric Opera of Chicago as Riccardo Forth in Vincenzo Bellini's I puritani with Callas as Elvira, di Stefano as Arturo, and Nicola Rossi-Lemeni as Giorgio. He sang regularly in Chicago between 1955 and 1958, as Conte di Luna (opposite Jussi Björling and Herva Nelli), Don Carlo, Germont and Marcello. In 1956, he returned to La Scala to sing his first Renato in Un ballo in maschera, and portrayed Figaro in Il barbiere di Siviglia at the Arena di Verona after recording it under Alberto Erede for Decca Records.

After leaving the Met in May 1957, Bastianini made his first appearance on Italian television in a filmed version of Il trovatore with Leyla Gencer, Mario del Monaco and Fedora Barbieri. That summer, he sang Don Carlo in a legendary production of Verdi's Ernani at the Maggio Musicale Fiorentino under Dimitri Mitropoulos with Anita Cerquetti, Mario del Monaco and Boris Christoff. This was followed by performances in four different operas in seven days in Bilbao and a return to La Scala in December 1957 for another lauded production: Un ballo in maschera under Gianandrea Gavazzeni with Callas, Di Stefano, and Giulietta Simionato.

=== Golden years: 1958–1962 ===
In 1958, Bastianini sang his first Scarpia at the Teatro di San Carlo. This was followed by three other roles new to him at La Scala that summer: Belcore in L'elisir d'amore, Ernesto in Il pirata (with Callas and Franco Corelli), and the title role in Nabucco. In July of that year, he made his debut at the Salzburg Festival as Rodrigo under Herbert von Karajan, and then returned to Bilbao in September for several more performances. Towards the end of the year, he sang four roles in five days at the Palacio de Bellas Artes in Mexico City, followed by his only baroque opera role, Lichas in Handel's Hercules under Lovro von Matačić, at La Scala.

In September 1958, Bastianini sang for the first time at the Vienna State Opera as Scarpia opposite Tebaldi's Tosca. He performed regularly there until the end of his career, in 1965. In the fall of 1959, he debuted at the Dallas Opera singing Enrico opposite Callas's Lucia, and Figaro as well. The following December, he sang his first Michonnet in Francesco Cilea's Adriana Lecouvreur at the Teatro di San Carlo, starring Magda Olivero. He returned to that house in 1960 to sing Don Carlo in Ernani, a role he also portrayed at the Salzburg Festival that year. Also in 1960, he sang Severo in Donizetti's Poliuto in a famous production that marked the return of Callas to La Scala.

In February 1961, he debuted with the Philadelphia Lyric Opera Company as Rigoletto. Later that month he appeared in two productions at La Scala, Lucia di Lammermoor with Dame Joan Sutherland and I puritani with Renata Scotto. In December 1961, he returned to La Scala to sing his first and only performances of Rolando in Verdi's rarely heard opera La battaglia di Legnano. In 1962, he made his first and only appearance at the Royal Opera, Covent Garden as Renato, returned to the Lyric Opera of Chicago to sing the title role in Rigoletto, and sang Conte di Luna at La Scala and the Salzburg Festival, in addition to several performances with the Vienna State Opera. His mother died in April of that year, of cancer, in Siena.

=== Battling illness and the end of a career: 1963–1967 ===
In November 1962 Bastianini was diagnosed with a throat tumor just months after his mother's death from cancer. He discussed his illness with only his family and a few very close friends, fearing the negative impact that the news could have on his career. He spent the first four months of 1963 in treatment in Switzerland, and then, the following April, returned to the stage for several of his staple roles at the Vienna State Opera. Noting that his voice seemed drier than previously, critics gave him mixed reviews. As his health declined further, Bastianini became depressed and uncertain whether he should continue singing.

On 2 July 1963, he won the Palio di Siena as captain of the Pantera-contrada, the town quarter of the Panther. Though usually the people of the neighbourhood pay all the costs involved (the jockey and the secret deals with other contrada), Bastianini was very generous with his own fortune. In 1958, he had already made a generous gift for the construction of the headquarters of Pantera. On the evening of the Cena della Vittoria, the Dinner of Victory, he sang for the people of his quarter. After his death, Cynthia Wood, his last companion, became captain of the Contrada della Pantera, one of the few and the only American woman to hold this position. Bastianini bought the winning horse, the famous Topolone, and changed its name to Ettore. Shortly thereafter, he appeared successfully as Conte di Luna at the Salzburg Festival. The following autumn, he debuted in Tokyo in a much-lauded production of Il trovatore, broadcast live on Japanese television. In December of that year he made his last appearance at La Scala, as Rodrigo in Don Carlo.

Bastianini's health declined steadily over the last two years of his career. His performances were inconsistent, some excellent and others poor. In 1964, he sang his last new role, Mephisto in La damnation de Faust, at the Teatro di San Carlo in Naples, to good reviews, but his Conte di Luna in Il trovatore in Prato that year was reportedly disastrous. In 1965, his final year on stage, he returned to the Lyric Opera of Chicago to sing Amonasro. He also portrayed Scarpia at the Teatro Comunale Florence, and Iago at the Cairo Opera House. He spent most of 1965 at the Met with mixed results. Some performances were well received, but he was booed during a performance of Tosca. His final operatic appearance was as Rodrigo in Verdi's Don Carlo at the Met, on 11 December 1965. He finally succumbed to cancer in January 1967, and was buried in his hometown of Siena.

The Associazione Internazionale Culturale Musicale Ettore Bastianini (www.associazioneettorebastianini.org) keeps alive the artistic legacy of this singer.

== Recordings ==
Most of his studio recordings were made for Decca Records, and a few for Deutsche Grammophon as well, and accurately represent his rich and expressive voice. They include:

- Verdi: Aida with Curtis-Verna, Dominguez, Borso, Scott. Franco Capuana (cond.) La Fenice 1952. (Remington)
- G. Donizetti: La favorita with Simionato, Jerome Hines, Gianni Poggi. Alberto Erede (cond.) Maggio Musicale Fiorentino 1955. (Decca)
- Verdi: La traviata with Callas, Di Stefano. Carlo Maria Giulini (cond.) 1955. (EMI)
- Verdi: La forza del destino with Tebaldi, del Monaco, Simionato, Siepi. Francesco Molinari-Pradelli (cond.) 1955. (Decca)
- G.Rossini: Il barbiere di Siviglia with Simionato, Misciano, Siepi, Fernando Corena. Erede (cond.) 1956. (Decca)
- P.Mascagni: Cavalleria rusticana with Tebaldi, Björling. Alberto Erede (cond.) 1957. (Decca)
- A.Ponchielli: La Gioconda with Cerquetti (her only complete opera recording in studio), Simionato, del Monaco, Siepi. Gavazzeni (cond.) 1957. (Decca)
- U.Giordano: Andrea Chénier with Tebaldi, del Monaco. Gianandrea Gavazzeni (cond.) 1957. (Decca)
- G.Puccini: La bohème with Tebaldi, Carlo Bergonzi, Gianna D'Angelo, Cesare Siepi. Tullio Serafin (cond.) 1958. (Decca)
- Puccini: Tosca with Tebaldi, di Stefano. Gianandrea Gavazzeni (cond.) Live in Brussels. 1958. (Myto)
- Verdi: La forza del destino with Tebaldi, Franco Corelli, Renato Capecchi, Boris Christoff. Francesco Molinari-Pradelli (cond.) 1958. (Hardy Classic)
- Donizetti: Lucia di Lammermoor with Scotto, Di Stefano, Vinco. Nino Sanzogno (cond.) La Scala 1959. (Mercury/Ricordi)
- Verdi: Rigoletto with Scotto, Kraus, Cossotto, Vinco. Gianandrea Gavazzeni (cond.) Maggio Musicale Fiorentino 1960. (Mercury/Ricordi)
- Verdi: Don Carlo with Stella, Cossotto, Labò, Christoff, Vinco. Gabriele Santini (cond.) La Scala 1961 (DG)
- Verdi: Un ballo in maschera with Stella, Poggi, Lazzarini, Tavolaccini. Gavazzeni (cond.) La Scala 1961 (DG)
- Verdi: Il trovatore with Stella, Cossotto, Bergonzi and Vinco. Tullio Serafin (cond.) La Scala 1962 (DG)
- Verdi: La traviata with Scotto and Gianni Raimondi. Antonino Votto (cond.), La Scala 1963. (DG)
- G.Donizetti: Poliuto with Callas, Franco Corelli. Antonino Votto (cond.) Live from Scala, 1960. (EMI)
- Verdi: Don Carlo with Sena Jurinac, Simionato, Eugenio Fernandi, Siepi. Von Karajan (cond.) Live in Salzburg. 1958. (DG)
- Verdi: Ernani with Cerquetti, del Monaco, Boris Christoff. Mitropoulos (cond.) Live in Florence. 1957. (Bel Canto)
- Verdi: Il trovatore with Corelli, Price, Simionato. Karajan [cond.] Live in Salzburg. 1962. (DG)

In addition to the recordings included above, there is a live album of his concert in Chicago with Tebaldi and Simionato, conducted by Sir Georg Solti and issued by Decca, as well as a Neapolitan song recital. When von Karajan recorded Johann Strauss's Die Fledermaus for Decca, Bastianini was also invited to sing in the Gala scene. The duet he chose, "Anything you can do, I can do better" from Irving Berlin's musical Annie Get Your Gun, was the only non-Italian piece he ever recorded. His duet partner Giulietta Simionato had, like him, learned her words phonetically. Also noteworthy is a 1955 television appearance (published on DVD in 2006) on Opera Cameos of excerpts from La traviata with the young Beverly Sills and Paul Knowles.

== Sources ==
- Kutsch, K. J.; Riemens, Leo (1969). A concise biographical dictionary of singers: from the beginning of recorded sound to the present. Translated from German, expanded and annotated by Harry Earl Jones. Philadelphia: Chilton Book Company. ISBN 0-8019-5516-5.
- Boagno, Marina; Starone, Gilberto (1991). Ettore Bastianini. Una voce di bronzo e di velluto. Parma: Azzali. p. 272.
- Rizzacasa, Alessandro, ed. (1999). Ettore Bastianini. Siena: nuova immagine editrice. p. 205. ISBN 978-88-7145-162-6.
- Marina Boagno, Ettore Bastianini: i suoi personaggi, Azzali Editore, Parma 2004
- Antonio Mazzeo, Ettore Bastianini basso: stralci di vita e di arte degli inizi, Siena, 1996.
- Angela Rigoli (cur.), Ettore Bastianini:Un nido di memorie (raccolta di testimonianze), 2012 edito inproprio dall'Associazione Bastianini.
- Marina Berti - Marcello Vanni, Egli ci fu rapito.... Viaggio nella breve vita di Ettore Bastianini e nella sua Siena, (Romanzo), Siena, 2016
- Manuela Bianchi Porro, La finestra sul lago - Ricordo di Ettore Bastianini (testo raccolto da Luisella Franchini), Youcanprint 2018 (edito in proprio dall'Associazione Bastianini) e poi Youcanprint 2021 ISBN 979-12-203-7779-9. Also in English: Manuela Bianchi Porro, Window on the lake. Remembering Ettore Bastianini (Edited by Luisella Franchini, translation by Marilyn Fornero), Youcanprint 2022 ISBN 979-12-203-8867-2
- Luisella Franchini, Valerio Lopane, Il mio pensiero per te – La vita e l’arte di Ettore Bastianini nelle lettere a Manuela Bianchi Porro, Cantagalli Editore Siena 2021 ISBN 978-88-6879-931-1
- Vito Stabile, Lietamente filosofando in lirica (Saggio dedicato a Ettore Bastianin), Youcanprint 2021, ISBN 979-12-203-7802-4
- Maurizio Modugno, Luisella Franchini, Valerio Lopane, Ettore Bastianini. La più bella voce al mondo, pp. XIV+314, Zecchini Editore, 2022, ISBN 978-88-6540-393-8.
- Gilberto Starone, Le cronologie originali di Ettore Bastianini (sponsored by Associazione Ettore Bastianini), Youcanprint 2023, ISBN 979-12-214-7338-4
