= Simionato =

Simionato is a surname. Notable people with the surname include:

- Carlo Simionato (born 1961), Italian sprinter
- Chiara Simionato (born 1975), Italian long track speed skater
- Giulietta Simionato (1910–2010), Italian mezzo-soprano
- Omar Simionato (born 1971), Argentine footballer
- Pedro Simionato (born 1938), Argentine cyclist
