= Franco Corelli =

Italian opera singer (1921–2003)

Franco Corelli Commendatore OMRI
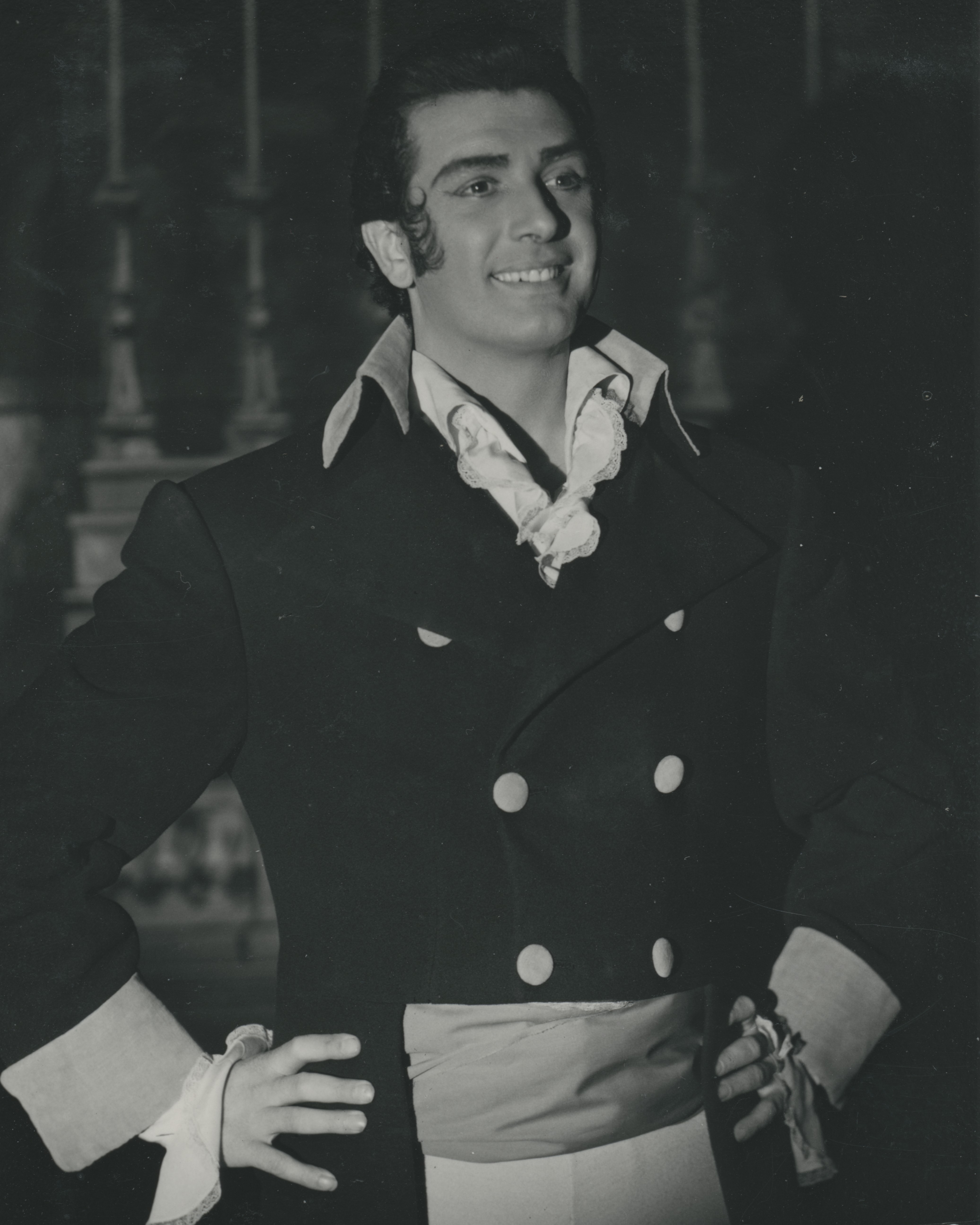
- Corelli in Tosca, 1956
- Born: Dario Franco Corelli; April 8, 1921; Ancona, Kingdom of Italy
- Died: October 29, 2003 (aged 82); Milan, Italy
- Resting place: Cimitero Monumentale di Milano, Milan, Italy
- Education: University of Bologna
- Occupation: Opera Singer
- Spouse: Loretta Di Lelio (m. 1958; death 2003)

Franco Corelli (8 April 1921 – 29 October 2003) was an Italian tenor who had a major international opera career between 1951 and 1976. Associated in particular with the spinto and dramatic tenor roles of the Italian and French repertories, he was celebrated universally for his powerhouse voice, electrifying top notes, clear timbre, passionate singing and remarkable performances. Dubbed the "prince of tenors", audiences were enchanted by his handsome features and charismatic stage presence. He had a long and fruitful partnership with the Metropolitan Opera in New York City between 1961 and 1975. He also appeared on the stages of most of the major opera houses in Europe and with opera companies throughout North America.

== Biography ==
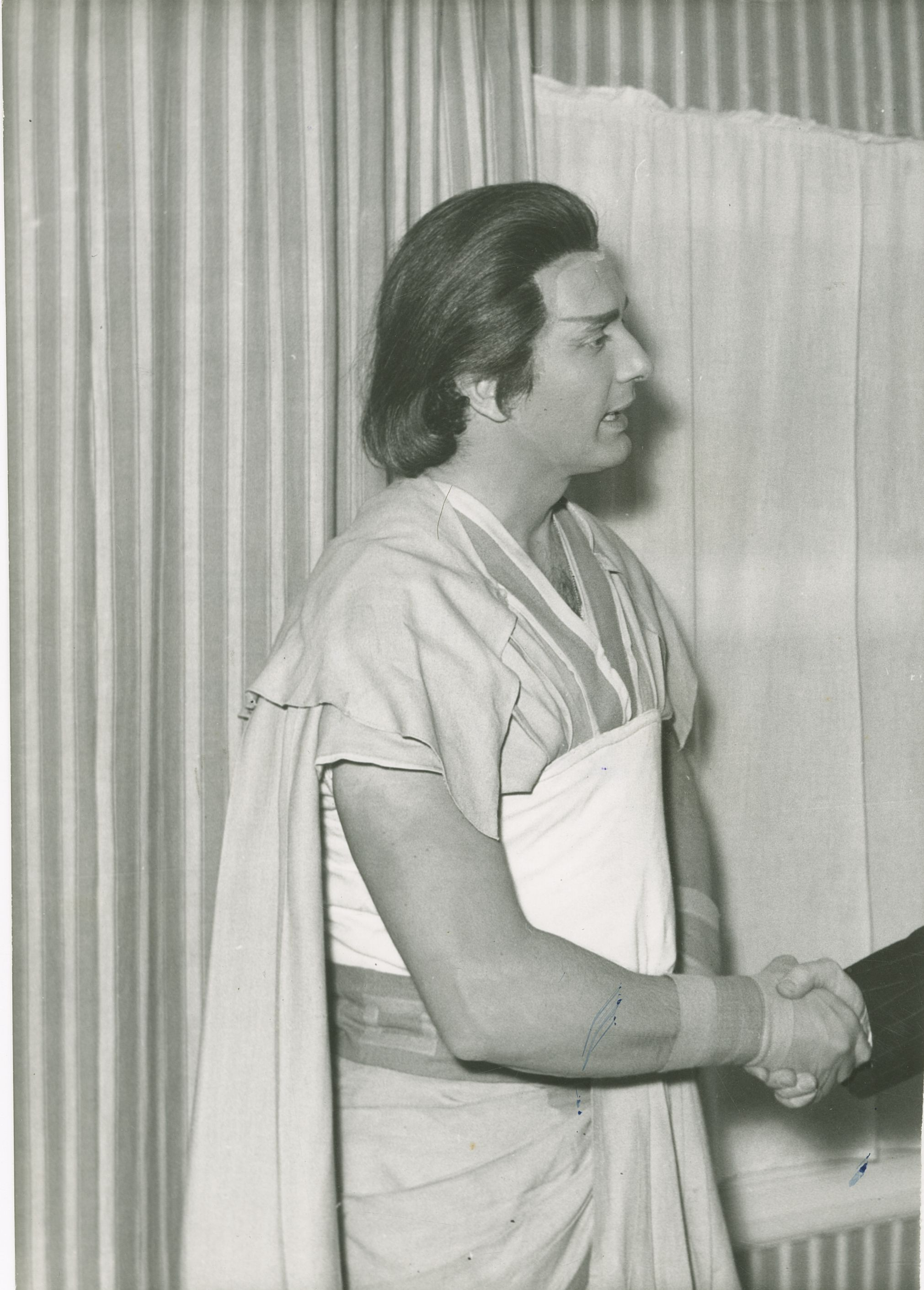
Franco Corelli on the occasion of the performance of Giuseppe Verdi's Aida, Naples, San Carlo Theatre, 1955–1956 season.

=== Early life and education: 1921–1950 ===
Corelli was born Dario Franco Corelli in Ancona into a family some say had little or no musical background. While his parents were not particularly musical, his paternal grandfather Augusto had actually quit working at 35 to establish a successful career as an operatic tenor. His older brother Aldo subsequently quit school to become an operatic baritone, and two of his uncles sang in the Teatro delle Muse chorus in Ancona. His father was a shipbuilder for the Italian Navy and the family lived beside the Adriatic Sea. Corelli loved the sea and initially decided to follow in the footsteps of his father by pursuing a degree in naval engineering at the University of Bologna. While studying there he entered a music competition under the dare of a friend who was an amateur singer. While he did not win the competition, he was encouraged by the judges to pursue a singing career and Corelli entered the Pesaro Conservatory of Music to study opera.

At the conservatory, Corelli studied under Rita Pavoni, but was unhappy with the results, saying these lessons basically destroyed his upper register. After this Corelli decided to become his own teacher, and referred to voice teachers as "dangerous people" and a "plague to singers". Corelli stated that he learned part of his technique from a friend who was a student of Arturo Melocchi, the voice teacher who taught Mario Del Monaco, and who advocated a technique based on singing with the larynx lowered. Corelli studied with Melocchi himself only "sometimes". Corelli modified the technique to avoid limitations that Corelli perceived in the ability of students of Melocchi to handle mezza-voce (moderate volume) and legato (smooth) singing. He carefully studied the career of Del Monaco, who preceded Corelli into the first rank of Italian tenors using the lowered-larynx technique, and who was sometimes criticized for lacking subtlety in his singing. Corelli stated: "I ultimately modified the method so that my larynx 'floats'—I do not keep it lowered to the maximum at all times." Corelli also learned by imitating the style and vocal effects of the recordings of great tenors like Enrico Caruso, Giacomo Lauri-Volpi, Aureliano Pertile, and Beniamino Gigli. Opera News stated that Corelli's lowered-larynx technique "resulted in [a] cavernous sound even in high-flying passages, where it gained brilliance. Regulating the breath pressure, the tenor was able to reduce this sound while retaining the core of the voice in a diminuendo, or even a morendo on a high B-flat, the effect requested by Verdi at the end of 'Celeste Aida'."

=== Early career: 1951–1960 ===
In the summer of 1951, Corelli won the Maggio Musicale Fiorentino in Florence, earning a debut at Spoleto the following fall. He was originally scheduled to sing Radames in Verdi's Aïda and spent three months preparing the role with conductor Giuseppe Bertelli. However, Corelli eventually switched to Don José in Bizet's Carmen, feeling that at this point he lacked the technical finesse and legato for the role of Radamès. In May 1952, he made his debut at the Rome Opera as Maurizio in Adriana Lecouvreur opposite Maria Caniglia as Adriana. The same year he appeared in operas with smaller opera houses throughout Italy and on the Italian radio. In 1953 he joined the Rome Opera's roster of principal tenors where he spent much of his time performing through 1958. His first role with the company in 1953 was that of Romeo in Zandonai's rarely heard opera Giulietta e Romeo. Later that season he sang Pollione in Bellini's Norma opposite Maria Callas in the title role. It was the first time the two sang opposite one another and Callas immediately became an admirer of Corelli. The two performed frequently with each other over the next several years in a partnership that lasted to the end of Callas's career.

While singing at the Rome Opera, Corelli also made numerous appearances with other opera houses both in Italy and internationally. He made his first appearance at La Scala in Milan in 1954, as Licinio in Spontini's La vestale opposite Callas's Giulia for the opening of the 1954–1955 season. He returned several more times to that house over the next five years, singing opposite Callas in productions of Fedora (1956), Il pirata (1958) and Poliuto (1960). He also notably portrayed the role of Dick Johnson in a highly celebrated performance of La fanciulla del West at La Scala in 1956, opposite Gigliola Frazzoni and Tito Gobbi, which was broadcast live on Italian radio. Other important debuts for Corelli soon followed, including his first appearances at: the Maggio Musicale Fiorentino in Florence and the Arena di Verona Festival in 1955; the Vienna State Opera, as Radamès, and the Royal Opera House, Covent Garden, in London, as Cavaradossi, in 1957; the Teatro Nacional de São Carlos in Lisbon, the Lyric Opera of Chicago and the San Francisco Opera in 1958; and the Berlin State Opera in 1961. Among the many triumphs of the decade for Corelli were two highly celebrated performances at the Teatro di San Carlo in Naples, a 1958 appearance as Don Alvaro in La forza del destino opposite another one of his frequent collaborators, Renata Tebaldi as Leonora and a 1959 performance of Maurizio in Adriana Lecouvreur opposite Magda Olivero in the title role.

During his early career, Corelli sang in a number of rare operas in which he triumphed including performances of Spontini's Agnes von Hohenstaufen in its Italian version, Agnese di Hohenstaufen, Handel's Giulio Cesare and Hercules, Prokofiev's War and Peace, and the world premiere of Guido Guerrini's Enea. By 1960 his active repertory included some 30 roles including the title role in Giordano's Andrea Chénier, Turiddu in Mascagni's Cavalleria rusticana, Rodolfo in Puccini's La bohème, and the title roles in Verdi's Don Carlo and Ernani.

In 1957, Corelli met soprano Loretta di Lelio when she came backstage after one of his performances at the Rome Opera House to get his autograph. They began seeing each other romantically and married in 1958. After their marriage, Loretta gave up her fledgling opera career to serve as her husband's business manager, secretary, public relations agent, cook, and English translator. Their marriage endured until Corelli's death forty-five years later.

=== The Metropolitan Opera years: 1961–1975 ===
Corelli made his debut at New York's Metropolitan Opera on 27 January 1961 as Manrico in Il trovatore, opposite soprano Leontyne Price as Leonora who was also making her house debut at the Met that evening. He would sing to great acclaim at the Met until 1974 in roles such as Calaf (with Birgit Nilsson as Turandot), Cavaradossi, Maurizio, Ernani, Rodolfo and Edgardo. He also undertook French parts in new productions of Roméo et Juliette and Werther. He sang at a number of historic nights at the Met including: the closing gala at the old Met, the concert honoring Sir Rudolf Bing's retirement, and Callas's legendary comeback Tosca. His last performance at the Met was on 28 December 1974 as Calàf with Ingrid Bjoner, also singing her last performance at the Met, as Turandot. However, Corelli did tour extensively with the Metropolitan Opera in 1975, singing in performances in cities throughout the United States and in Japan.

While singing at the Met, Corelli continued to be a presence on the international stage. In 1961 he made his debut with the Deutsche Oper Berlin. He returned to La Scala in 1962, for a revival of Meyerbeer's Les Huguenots, opposite Joan Sutherland, and that same year appeared as Manrico in a lauded production of Il trovatore at the Salzburg Festival under Herbert von Karajan and opposite Leontyne Price, Giulietta Simionato, and Ettore Bastianini. Also in 1962 he made his first appearance with the Philadelphia Lyric Opera Company as Mario Cavaradossi. He returned to Philadelphia almost every year through 1971 portraying close to a dozen different roles. He made his debut at the Paris Opéra in 1964 opposite Callas in Tosca and Norma. He also earned high acclaim while collaborating with the Italian-American conductor Alfredo Antonini in several gala concerts in New York during the mid-1960s.

In the early 1970s, Corelli's voice began to show some signs of wear after years of hard use in a demanding repertory. As a result, the resultant nerves surrounding performances became increasingly difficult to handle for the tenor. He made his last opera appearance as Rodolfo in 1976 in Torre del Lago at the age of 55. Corelli later said of the decision, "I felt that my voice was a little tired, a little opaque, less brilliant than before. The singer's life cost me a great deal. I was full of apprehension and mad at everyone. I was a bundle of nerves, I wasn't eating or sleeping."

=== Later life: 1976–2003 ===
After retiring from the stage, Corelli became a popular voice teacher in New York City, somewhat ironic for a man who himself disdained voice teachers for much of his life. He was briefly coaxed out of retirement for concerts in 1980 and 1981. He died in Milan 29 October 2003, aged 82, after suffering a stroke earlier that year, and was buried in Milan's Cimitero Monumentale.

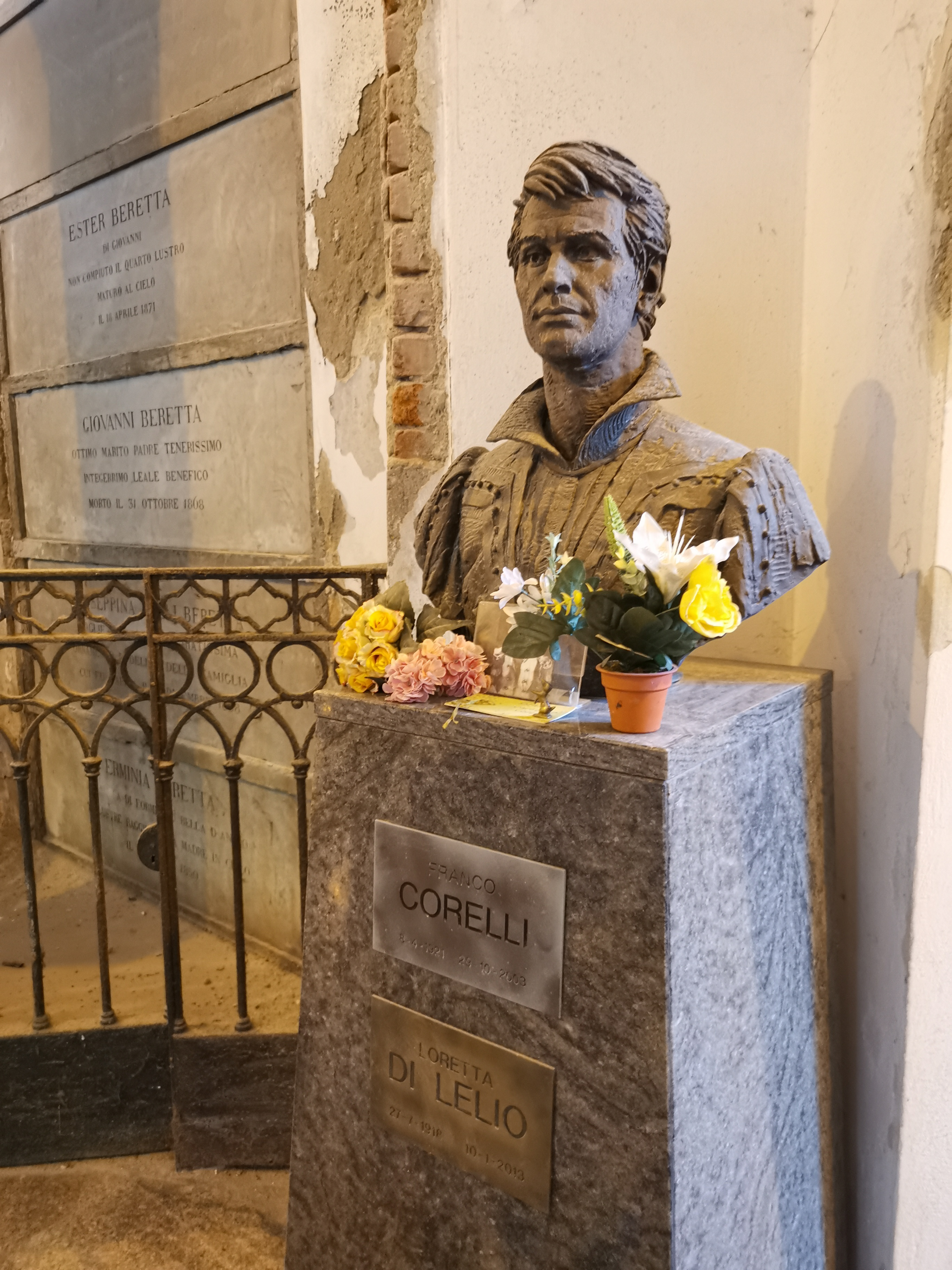
Franco Corelli's resting place at the Cimitero Monumentale.

=== Critical reception ===
With a rich and ringing spinto tenor voice and movie-star good looks, Corelli won a wide public following from early on his career. Luciano Pavarotti described Corelli as having "vocal cords of steel". However, while the public was enthralled with the tenor, music critics were divided, with some complaining about what they perceived as self-indulgence of phrasing and expression. During the 1960s the anti-Corelli sentiment was epitomized by Alan Rich of The New York Herald Tribune in a 1966 article which, while acknowledged the vibrancy and white heat of his singing, considered Corelli a throwback. Rich said that Corelli is "not employed by an opera, but employs it to serve purposes it was not meant to serve." Also, many critics did not look favourably on his performances in French opera, owing to the tenor's exotic French diction and style. Nevertheless, many of Corelli's most celebrated roles have been in French: Don Jose in Bizet's Carmen, which he is known to have sung over 100 times; Romeo in Gounod's Romeo et Juliette; and the title role in Massenet's Werther. Corelli also had his admirers among several highly respected and notable critics, including Harold C. Schonberg of The New York Times, who once defended the expressive liberties taken by Corelli saying that his performance possessed "its own kind of logic".

== Repertoire ==
Repertoire
Role	Opera	Composer
Remo	Romulus	Allegra
Gualtiero	Il pirata	Bellini
Pollione	Norma	Bellini
Don José	Carmen	Bizet
Maurizio di Sassonia	Adriana Lecouvreur	Cilea
Edgardo Ravenswood	Lucia di Lammermoor	Donizetti
Poliuto	Poliuto	Donizetti
Andrea Chénier	Andrea Chénier	Giordano
Loris Ipanov	Fedora	Giordano
Achille	Ifigenia in Aulide	Gluck
Faust	Faust	Gounod
Roméo	Roméo et Juliette	Gounod
Orfeo; Turno	Enea	Guerrini
Sesto Pompeo	Giulio Cesare in Egitto	Händel
Illo	Hercules	Händel
Canio	Pagliacci	Leoncavallo
Turiddu	Cavalleria rusticana	Mascagni
Werther	Werther	Massenet
Raoul di Nangis	Les Huguenots	Meyerbeer
Enzo Grimaldo	La Gioconda	Ponchielli
Pierre Bezhukov	War and peace	Prokofiev
Rodolfo	La bohème	Puccini
Mario Cavaradossi	Tosca	Puccini
Dick Johnson	La fanciulla del West	Puccini
Calaf	Turandot	Puccini
Arnold Melcthal	Guillaume Tell	Rossini
Licinio	La Vestale	Spontini
Enrico di Braunschweig	Agnese di Hohenstaufen	Spontini
Ernani	Ernani	Verdi
Macduff	Macbeth	Verdi
Arrigo	La battaglia di Legnano	Verdi
Manrico	Il trovatore	Verdi
Gabriele Adorno	Simon Boccanegra	Verdi
Gustavo III	Un ballo in maschera	Verdi
Don Alvaro	La forza del destino	Verdi
Don Carlo	Don Carlo	Verdi
Radames	Aida	Verdi
Romeo Montecchi	Giulietta e Romeo	Zandonai

== Selected recordings ==
Corelli made many recordings of solo arias and complete operas. These reveal the splendour of Corelli's voice in its prime during the late 1950s and 1960s. Many admirers prefer recordings of his live performances, finding Corelli's singing in front of an audience more exciting than his studio performances. Many of these are available.

Year	Opera	Cast	Conductor, Opera House and Orchestra	Label
1956	Verdi – Aida	Mary Curtis Verna, Franco Corelli, Miriam Pirazzini, Giangiacomo Guelfi, Giulio Neri	Angelo Questa; Chorus and Orchestra of the RAI Turin	Cetra
1960	Bellini – Norma	Maria Callas, Christa Ludwig, Franco Corelli, Nicola Zaccaria	Tullio Serafin; Coro e Orchestra Teatro alla Scala	EMI
1960	Leoncavallo – Pagliacci	Franco Corelli, Lucine Amara, Tito Gobbi, Mario Zanasi	Lovro von Matačić; Coro e Orchestra Teatro alla Scala	EMI
1962	Mascagni – Cavalleria rusticana	Victoria de los Ángeles, Franco Corelli, Mario Sereni	Gabriele Santini; Rome Opera Chorus and Orchestra	EMI
1963	Bizet – Carmen	Leontyne Price, Franco Corelli, Mirella Freni, Robert Merrill	Herbert von Karajan; Wiener Philharmoniker and Wiener Staatsopernchor	RCA
1963	Giordano – Andrea Chénier	Franco Corelli, Antonietta Stella, Mario Sereni	Gabriele Santini; Rome Opera Chorus and Orchestra	EMI
1964	Verdi – Don Carlo	Franco Corelli, Leonie Rysanek, Irene Dalis, Nicolae Herlea, Giorgio Tozzi, Hermann Uhde	Kurt Adler; Metropolitan Opera (recorded live on 7 March)	Met Opera
1964	Verdi – Il trovatore	Franco Corelli, Gabriella Tucci, Giulietta Simionato, Robert Merrill, Ferruccio Mazzoli	Thomas Schippers; Rome Opera Chorus and Orchestra	EMI
1965	Puccini – Turandot	Birgit Nilsson, Franco Corelli, Renata Scotto, Bonaldo Giaiotti	Francesco Molinari-Pradelli; Rome Opera Chorus and Orchestra	EMI
1967	Verdi – Aida	Birgit Nilsson, Franco Corelli, Grace Bumbry, Mario Sereni, Bonaldo Giaiotti	Zubin Mehta; Rome Opera Chorus and Orchestra	EMI
1966	Gounod – Faust	Joan Sutherland, Franco Corelli, Nicolai Ghiaurov	Richard Bonynge; Ambrosian Opera Chorus, London Symphony Orchestra	DECCA
1966	Puccini – Tosca	Birgit Nilsson, Franco Corelli, Dietrich Fischer-Dieskau	Lorin Maazel; Orchestra dell'Accademia Nazionale di Santa Cecilia	DECCA
1968	Gounod – Roméo et Juliette	Franco Corelli, Mirella Freni, Xavier Dupraz	Alain Lombard; Paris Opera Chorus and Orchestra	EMI
1970	Bizet – Carmen	Franco Corelli, Anna Moffo, Helen Donath, Piero Cappuccilli	Lorin Maazel; Orchester und Chor der Deutschen Oper Berlin	RCA

== Bibliography ==
- Hamilton, David; Andris-Michalaros, Aliki, eds. (1987). The Metropolitan Opera Encyclopedia. Simon and Schuster. ISBN 978-0-6716-1732-5.
- Gruber, Paul (1993). The Metropolitan Opera Guide to Recorded Opera. W.W. Norton. ISBN 978-0-3930-3444-8.
- Landini, Giancarlo (2010). Franco Corelli, L'uomo, la voce, l'arte. Viareggio: Idea Books. ISBN 978-8-8880-3368-6.
