= Gabriella Tucci =

Italian operatic soprano (1929–2020)

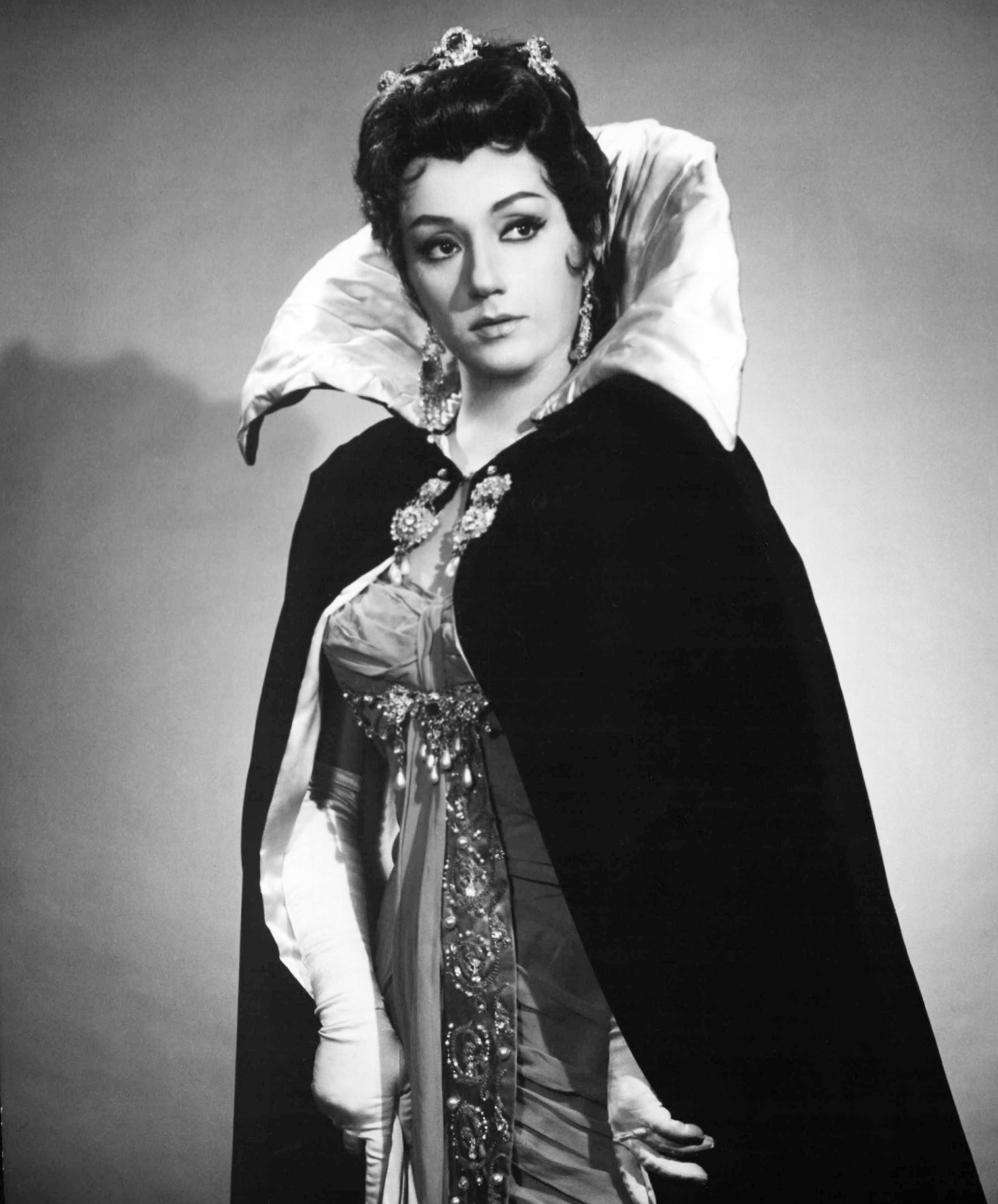
- Gabriella Tucci as Tosca in 1968
- Born: 4 August 1929; Rome, Italy
- Died: 9 July 2020 (aged 90); Rome, Italy
- Education: Accademia di Santa Cecilia
- Occupation: Operatic soprano

Gabriella Tucci (4 August 1929 – 9 July 2020) was an Italian operatic soprano who was particularly associated with the Italian repertory and performed at notable opera houses worldwide. She appeared at the Metropolitan Opera in 11 Verdi roles across 13 seasons, including Violetta in La traviata and Desdemona in Otello.

== Life ==
Gabriella Tucci (photo with 1958 dedication)

Born in Rome on 4 August 1929, Tucci trained at the Accademia di Santa Cecilia with Leonardo Filoni, whom she later married. She made her debut at the Teatro del Giglio in Lucca in 1951 as Violetta in Verdi's La traviata. In 1952, she won the competition of Spoleto, and appeared at the Teatro Lirico Sperimentale as Leonora in Verdi's La forza del destino alongside Beniamino Gigli. She then took part in the famous revival of Cherubini's Medea, as Glauce opposite Maria Callas, at the Maggio Musicale Fiorentino in 1953.

She made her debut at La Scala in Milan in 1959 as Mimì in Puccini's La bohème, and her American debut the same year at the San Francisco Opera as Maddalena in Giordano's Andrea Chénier. The next year she had debuts at both the Royal Opera House in London, as Puccini's Tosca, and the Metropolitan Opera in New York City, as his Madama Butterfly. In 260 appearances with the Met between 29 October 1960 and 25 December 1972, she was in twenty roles, including a record eleven of Verdi's: ranked in decreasing order of the number of times that she played them, they were Aida, Leonora in Il trovatore, Alice Ford in Falstaff, Marguerite in Gounod's Faust, Violetta in La traviata, Cio-Cio-San in Madama Butterfly, Puccini's Tosca, Desdemona in Otello, Mimì in La Bohème, Euridice in Gluck's Orfeo ed Euridice, Puccini's Turandot, Leonora in La forza del destino, Elizabeth de Valois in Don Carlo, Gilda in Rigoletto, Maddalena in Andrea Chénier, Donna Elvira in Mozart's Don Giovanni, Amelia in Simon Boccanegra, Amelia in Un ballo in maschera, Luisa Miller and Micaëla in Bizet's Carmen. Her performance of the final trio from Faust with Nicolai Gedda and Jerome Hines was the penultimate item in the gala for the Met's final performance in its first theatre on 16 April 1966. When she first appeared there as Mimì in 1964, partnered by Franco Corelli, a reviewer for The New York Times said: "It was Miss Tucci's Mimì that gave the evening its warmest glow. The soprano does not have the most seductive of voices, but – barring a couple of off‐pitch notes – she put it to affecting use in many an exquisite phrase. Slim and lovely to look at, she created a whole character, now shy, now pathetic, now ecstatic, always believable."

Tucci also appeared at the Opera di Roma, Arena di Verona, Vienna State Opera, and in Berlin, Moscow, Tokyo and Buenos Aires. She traveled with the La Scala Opera to Moscow and Tokyo, participating in performances recorded live.

Tucci performed in a wide range of operas from the bel canto of Bellini's I puritani to verismo works. Her repertoire encompassed eighty roles, including in English, French, German and Russian.

Tucci made two commercial recordings, Pagliacci in 1959, opposite Mario Del Monaco, and Il trovatore in 1964, opposite Franco Corelli, but she can be heard in a number of live performances, including in Cherubini's Medea and in Donizetti's Il furioso all'isola di San Domingo.

Tucci also appeared in concert. In February 1968, she sang in performances of Verdi's Requiem, with George Szell conducting the Cleveland Orchestra and chorus, in what was described as "a vibrant quartet" with Janet Baker, Pierre Duval and Martti Talvela.

She died in Rome at age 90.

== Discography ==
=== CDs ===
- Verdi: Il trovatore, cond. Thomas Schippers, EMI
- Leoncavallo: Pagliacci (coupled with Mascagni's Cavalleria rusticana), cond. Francesco Molinari-Pradelli, Decca

=== DVDs ===
- Leoncavallo: Pagliacci, cond. Giuseppe Morelli, VAI
- Verdi: Aida, cond. Franco Capuana, VAI
- Verdi: Otello, cond. Alberto Erede, VAI

== Sources ==
- The Metropolitan Opera Encyclopedia (Simon and Schuster, New York 1987). ISBN 0-671-61732-X
- Guide de l'opéra, Les indispensables de la musique (Fayard, 1995). ISBN 2-213-59567-4
