= Spiros Argiris =

Greek conductor

- Born: 24 August 1948; Athens, Kingdom of Greece
- Died: 19 May 1996 (aged 47); Nice, France

Spiros Argiris (Greek: Σπύρος Αργύρης, 24 August 1948 – 19 May 1996) was an orchestral and operatic conductor.

He served as the music director of the legendary Spoleto Festival both in Italy and the US from 1987 to 1992. He was appointed artistic director of the Teatro Massimo Bellini in Catania from 1991 to 1994 for which he won the Premio Abbiati (Italian music critics award) for 1991/1992 for Best Organiser.

He was awarded the same award as well in 1987/1988 for Best Show, Jenufa of Leoš Janáček, performed at the Spoleto Festival which he conducted and Günter Krämer directed. Memorable still remains his conducting of Richard Strauss Elektra with Krämer signing the production and Deborah Polaski in the title role as well as Mozart’s Nozze di Figaro directed by Gian Carlo Menotti and the part of the Countess sung by the very young Renee Fleming and Susanna sung by Youngok Shin.

== Early life and education ==
Born in Athens to an artistic family, both his parents were actors, he began his musical education at a very early age. After conducting studies in the Hochschule für Musik of Cologne, he went on to study conducting in Vienna with Hans Swarowsky and in Paris with Nadia Boulanger. He also studied the piano with Alfons Kontarsky.

== Early career ==
He began his career in Germany in theatres such as Aachen and Gelsenkirchen and in the late 70s met Gian Carlo Menotti while conducting “The Consul” at the Athens Opera House. This led to an invitation to the Spoleto Festival in 1976 to conduct some performances of Tchaikovsky’s “Pique Dame”. Ten years later, Gian Carlo Menotti invited him to become the music director of both Spoleto Festivals in Italy and the US (Charleston), post which he held from 1987 to 1992. Following Gian Carlo Menotti’s resignation from the Spoleto Festival USA, the board of directors appointed Spiros Argiris in 1994 as the artistic director of operatic and symphonic activities of the US Festival which he held until his death.

He conducted contemporary music at the Wittener Tage für neue Kammermusik. In 1980 he conducted the world premiere of Hans Werner Henze’s “El Rey de Harlem”, the Commissioned work for the WDR Köln with mezzo-soprano Maureen McNally and the Ensemble "Hinz und Kunst”. The Cologne Opera invited him in 1981 to conduct Bartók’s ballet, banned by the Nazis, “The Miraculous Mandarin” a big production commemorating 100 years of the composer’s birth. Later came the Berlin Opera where he conducted the world premiere of a ballet piece “Die Nacht aus Blei" by Hans-Jürgen von Bose and the Hamburg Opera where he conducted an eight-hour commemoration of the 100th anniversary of the birth of Stravinsky with choreographies of John Neumeier with Marcia Haydée. A big honour since for the 80th anniversary they had Stravinsky himself conducting.

== Music and artistic director ==
Besides the Spoleto Festival, Spiros Argiris also served as the music director of the Teatro Verdi in Trieste and the Orchestre Philharmonique de Nice.

He was best known as an opera conductor and led memorable productions at the Hamburg State Opera, the Deutsche Oper Berlin, the Bavarian State Opera, the Rome Opera, the Frankfurt Opera, the Monte Carlo Opera and the Bastille Opera in Paris. He also conducted in 1988 Jean-Pierre Ponnelle's critically acclaimed production of Britten’s “Peter Grimes” at the Maggio Musicale Fiorentino in Italy and in 1992 Ruth Berghaus’ famous production of Strauss’ “Rosenkavalier” in the Frankfurt Opera with Deborah Polaski debuting the role of the Marschallin.

As a symphonic conductor, he led amongst others the Radio Orchestras of Berlin and Cologne, as well as the Gewandhaus Orchestra of Leipzig, the Montreal Symphony, the Orchestra of Santa Cecilia, in Rome, the RAI orchestras of Milan and Turin and the Melbourne Symphony.

As the artistic director of the Teatro Massimo Bellini in Catania, Italy, from 1991 to 1994 he conducted Mozart's “Die Zauberflöte”, a production signed by Werner Herzog. The next year he persuaded Renata Scotto to sing under his baton her first Marschallin in Strauss's “Rosenkavalier”. She was awarded the "Premio Abbiati " and the "Frankfurter Allgemeine" Prize for the role. His sublime conducting of Mozart's “Cosi fan Tutte" directed by Pierre Audi in the same theatre was highly praised by the press.

== Death ==
The last opera he conducted was Richard Strauss’ Salome in January 1996, at the Teatro Carlo Felice in Genova with an enormous success. Gianfranco Cobelli and Paolo Tommasi signed the production and Karen Huffstodt sang the title role surrounded by Anja Silja (Herodiade) Michael Pabst (Herod), Harry Peters (Jokanaan), John Dickie (Narraboth). His last appearance on the podium was in March 1996 in Palermo, conducting the prestigious Orchestra Sinfonica Siciliana in Shostakovich 2° concerto for violin and orchestra as well as Mahler’s Symphony nr. 7. Spiros Argiris died the day of the opening of the Spoleto Festival USA on 19 May 1996. This was his last vision for a program of Opera and Symphonic Music. He was going to conduct the Verdi’s “Falstaff” production directed by Nicolas Joel.

== Legacy ==
In 2005, nine years after his death, he was remembered in an article for his Richard Strauss memorable interpretations by Corriere Della Sera’s lead music critic, Paolo Isotta.

In his honour, the municipality of Sarzana and the Committee of the Amici del Loggiato have initiated a competition for young singers bearing his name “Premio Spiros Argiris” with great success for the past 12 years.

In Spoleto, Italy, The Centro Studi "Belli-Argiris" was inaugurated on 24 September 1999, when the entire collection of books, sheet music and scores belonging to Spiros Argiris were donated by his family to join the important collection of Adriano Belli, founder of the Experimental Opera Theatre and create an important source for musical studies and research.

== Recordings ==
1. Spiros Argiris
2. Performer
