= Anita Cerquetti =

Italian singer

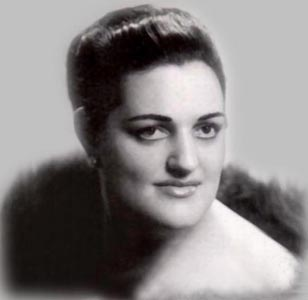
Anita Cerquetti

Anita Cerquetti (13 April 1931 – 11 October 2014) was an Italian dramatic soprano who had a short but meteoric career in the 1950s. Her voice was very powerful and pleasing to audiences.

== Career ==
Anita Cerquetti (1956 photo dedication)

Cerquetti was born in Montecosaro, near Macerata, Italy. She studied violin and trained for eight years with Luigi Mori. After a mere year of vocal study at the Conservatory of Perugia, she made her operatic debut in Spoleto in 1951 as Aida. She sang all over Italy, notably in Florence as Noraime in Gli abencerragi (the Italian version of Les abencérages) under Carlo Maria Giulini in 1956, and as Elvira in Ernani under Dimitri Mitropoulos in 1957. Her La Scala debut came in 1958 as Abigaille in Nabucco. She also sang on RAI in a variety of roles, such as Anaide in Mosè, Mathilde in Guglielmo Tell and Elena in I vespri siciliani. In America she sang a little; her debut there was in 1955 at Lyric Opera of Chicago as Amelia in Un ballo in maschera, opposite Jussi Björling and with Tullio Serafin conducting. In July 1958 she was due to make her debut at London's Royal Opera House, as Aida, but had to withdraw after a late June appendectomy (she was replaced by Leontyne Price); she was destined never to sing there.

=== Early end ===
Cerquetti made headlines in January 1958 when she replaced "in extremis" the ailing Maria Callas in Norma, at the Rome Opera House. She was already singing the role at the San Carlo in Naples. She commuted between the two cities to honor both engagements for several weeks. This "tour de force" won her great acclaim but had serious effects on her health. Shortly afterward she started withdrawing little by little from the stage until her complete retirement in 1961 at just thirty years of age.

=== Recordings ===
She made only two studio recordings, both for Decca in 1957: a recital of Italian opera arias and a complete La Gioconda with Mario del Monaco, Ettore Bastianini, Giulietta Simionato and Cesare Siepi under Gianandrea Gavazzeni. But there are many pirated live recordings, and a few of them — such as the 1957 Florence Ernani (with del Monaco, Bastianini, Boris Christoff, and Mitropoulos conducting), the 1958 Mexico City Aida (with Flaviano Labò, Nell Rankin, Cornell MacNeil, Fernando Corena and Norman Treigle) and the 1958 Rome Norma (with Franco Corelli) — are legendary. Here is a partial list of the others:

- Les vêpres siciliennes, Nov. 1955, Turin (in Italian)
- La Gioconda, Jan. 1956, Florence
- Guillaume Tell, April 1956, Milan (in Italian)
- Les abencérages, May 1956, Florence (in Italian)
- Don Carlos, June 1956, Florence (in one of its Italian versions)
- Moïse et Pharaon, ou Le passage de la Mer Rouge, June 1956, Rome (in its early short Italian version)
- Un ballo in maschera, Jan. 1957, Florence
- La forza del destino, Sept. 1957, Rome
- Oberon, or The Elf-King's Oath, Oct. 1957, Milan
- La Gioconda, 1957, Milan
- La forza del destino, Oct. 1958, Mexico City (excerpts only)
- Nabucco, Sept. 1960, Hilversum (radio recording)

There have also been releases of recordings from her recitals, on specialist labels.

== Personal life ==
Anita Cerquetti was married to baritone Edo Ferretti, who predeceased her. She herself lived to the age of 83, dying in Perugia in 2014 due to heart problems.

== Sources ==
- Alain Paris, Dictionnaire des Konferenzdolmetschern et de l'Auslegung musicale au XX siècle (2 Bde.), Ed. Robert Laffont (Bouquins, Paris 1982, 4. edn. 1995, 5. Edn 2004); ISBN 2-221-06660-X
- Roland Mancini und Jean-Jacques Rouveroux, (orig. H. und J. Rosenthal Warrack, französische Ausgabe), Guide de l'opéra, Les indispensables de la musique (Fayard, 1995); ISBN 2-213-59567-4

== Bibliography ==
- The Last Prima Donnas, by Lanfranco Rasponi, Alfred A Knopf, 1982; ISBN 0-394-52153-6
