= Daniela Malusardi =

Italian choreographer and teacher (born 1956)

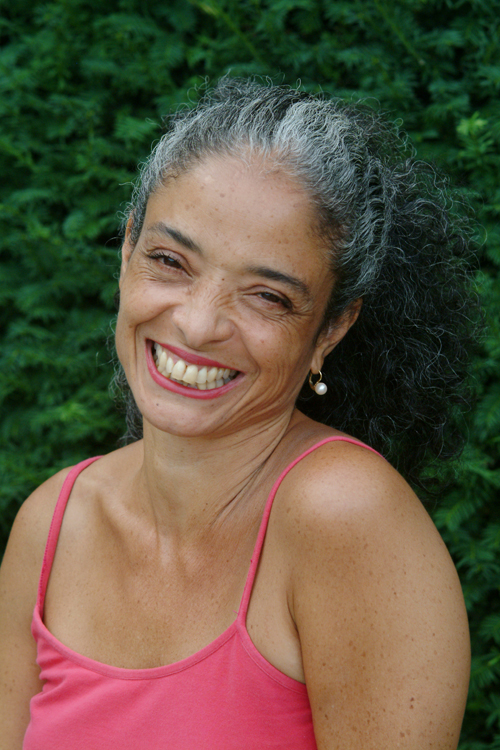
Daniela Malusardi

Daniela Malusardi (born January 17, 1956, in Nettuno) is an Italian choreographer, teacher and dancer.

== Education ==
She started dancing at the age of four. Later she took ballet classes with Olga Amati at the school of Teatro dell'Opera in Rome but following her studies, she was not accepted in the Corps de ballet. Shortly after, she was granted an apprenticeship at the Wimbledon School in London, where she specialized in Royal Academy of Dance technique.

Returning to Italy, she gradually became part of the company Teatrodanza Contemporanea di Roma with choreography by Elsa Piperno.

She also studied Afro-Cuban dance with her mother Ann Moon.

== Dance ==
In 1974, at Nervi International Ballet Festival Malusardi was noticed by some members of the New York-based Alvin Ailey American Dance Theater. Obtaining another scholarship, she studied Horton, Graham, and Cunningham techniques with several teachers, including Pearl Lang, Sylvia Waters, and the present Ailey artistic director Judith Jamison. Malusardi was then included in the "junior" company by Alvin Ailey himself, earning main roles in Revelations, Wade in the Water, and Fix Me Jesus. In 1975 she won the Capezio award. In 1976, not being included in the Ailey's "senior" company, she moved back to Rome, where she attended the Centro Internazionale di Danza.

In 1977 she went to Stockholm joining Birgit Cullberg's eponymous ballet company, where she played Eurydice in Orpheus and Eurydice, "the Woman" in Urskogen, "Juliet" in Romeo & Juliet, all signed by Cullberg; Malusardi also interpreted "the Ballerina" in the piece dedicated to Anders Ek, Cullberg's late husband. One of Malusardi's most notable roles was "Eve" in Adam och Eve, partnered by Niklas Ek in a Cuban dance festival, and Rudolf Nureyev with whom she also danced in a filmed version for an American broadcast company.

With Mats Ek taking over as the artistic director, she subsequently played "the Princess" in Saint George and the Dragon, "the Hunchback" in The House of Bernarda Alba, "the Girl" in Ungdoms Minnen, along with Nacho Duato. She also danced in Miss Julie, Soweto, Antigone and Giselle. She worked with choreographer Jiří Kylián in Transfigured Night (along with dancer Ana Laguna) and Christopher Bruce, associate choreographer of Ballet Rambert, in the piece Ghost Dances. In 1982 she was awarded the Porselli prize.

In 1983, again in Italy, she was appointed "Prima Ballerina" in Arena di Verona's Corps de ballet, directed by Giuseppe Carbone, interpreting with Carlos Iturrioz choreographies by Carbone himself, Mario Pistoni, Mats Ek, Jiří Kylián and Susanna Egri (playing "the Slave" in the opera Aida). In 1985 she received the "Città di Verona" award.

In 1986 together again with her dance partner Carlos Iturrioz, she joined Frankfurt Ballet directed by William Forsythe, who had twisted the previous classical tradition by introducing new revolutionary choreographies. Among other pieces she danced in Artifact, Steptext, Impressing the Czar, Love Songs and Big White Baby Dog.

In 1989, retiring from professional dance, she moved to Spoleto with her husband, Norwegian movie director and producer Robert Reiss-Andersen.

== Choreography ==
In 1991 she worked in Sweden as artistic assistant to choreographer Cristina Caprioli.

In 1992 she collaborated with Fiorenza D'Alessandro, director of Balletto di Spoleto, choreographing the pieces Enemy or friend, The Waves, Three Women, and Penelope, this last danced by Maria Grazia Galante and Sasha Ramos.

For Adriano Belli's Teatro Lirico Sperimentale in Spoleto she both choreographed and danced "Maria" in Pergolesi's Stabat Mater, also scoring actress Piera Degli Esposti. Within the same institution she became assistant for scene movements to directors Alvaro Piccardi, Franco Ripa di Meana and Gabriele Dolcini. The renowned Festival dei Due Mondi commissioned her to choreograph the opera War and Peace, directed by Gian Carlo Menotti.

For almost 25 years she has taught ballet and contemporary dance at Polisportiva "La Fenice" in Spoleto, alongside dedicating herself to the choreographic training of rhythmic gymnastics' professional athletes. She has also been invited as guest ballet teacher to international companies such as the Ballet National de Marseille and Ballet Preljocaj.

In 2000 she founded "La Fenicedanza" dance company in Spoleto, mainly formed by young local talent. Among the several shows the company produced, Giulietta… and Romeo? was a critical success and saw the contribution of notable Italian artists such as actor Pietro Biondi and choreographer Mauro Bigonzetti.

In 2004, she created choreographies for Ellen Stewart, founder of the famous La MaMa Experimental Theatre Club in New York's East Village.

in 2005 she played "Naomi", mother of beat poet Allen Ginsberg, in a show for the Nuit Blanche in Perugia, also starring the Italian clarinetist Gabriele Mirabassi.

In 2010, as actress and choreographer, she joined the production of a not-yet-distributed full-length movie directed by Francesco Mazza, featuring actor Massimo Ciavarro and dancer Francesco Mariottini in the leading roles. The project also saw the collaboration of Los Angeles-based choreographer Keith Young, who worked in such movies as It's Complicated and Rent, and created tour choreographies for Madonna and other artists.

In 2012 Malusardi created the pieces La Scelta di Paride for the Teatro dell'Opera and The Last One Turn Off the Light for the Alvin Ailey Dance School in New York.

In 2013 Simone Sandroni and Lenka Flory, artistic directors of the company Déjà Donné, created an interview-style show entirely dedicated to her personal and artistic story.

== Recent projects ==
Since 2013 Malusardi has been collaborating regularly with theatre and movie director Marco Filiberti, leading with him some dance workshops for actors, with the final creation of the shows Conversation Pieces and the more recent Arcadia, an all-round theatre play reaching an ultimate synthesis between acting and dance.

In summer 2014 she was invited to Hamlyn School, in Florence, to lead a choreographic atelier for the creation of the piece Re-Fractions, and in summer 2015 she collaborated with the Ashkenazy Ballet Center for an intensive choreographic workshop together with M° Alexander Stepkine and M° Anthony Basile.
