= Music of Marche =

The music of the Marche, a region of Italy, has been shaped by the fact that the entire region is a collection of small centers of population. There is no cultural giant to be found—no Florence or Naples—that might have shaped the cultural and musical expressions of the entire region. There is not a town in the region with more than 100,000 population, but there are 246 total towns, and they support no fewer than 113 theaters, a cultural building boom that started in the late 18th century. Historically, the entire area was home to a great number of monasteries and abbeys in the Middle Ages, institutions that had choirs and were active in the musical lives of the inhabitants. That period is still obscure and is currently the subject of musicological research. In the modern age, the region has a vibrant musical life.

== Musical venues and activities ==
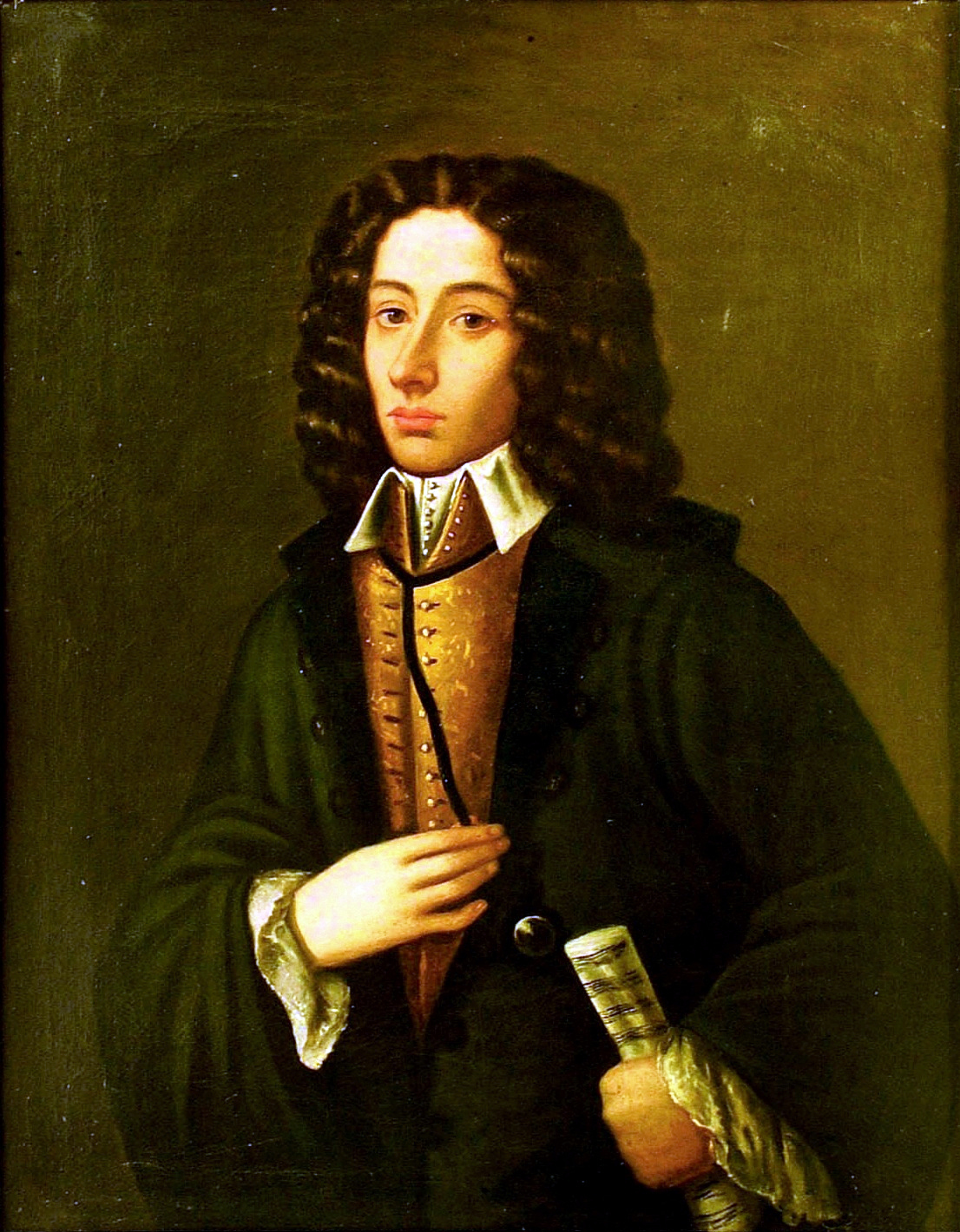
Giovanni Battista Pergolesi

Historically, the city of Ancona was known as a small center for music agencies, music printers and makers of stringed instruments. The main theater is the Teatro delle Muse ("Theater of the muses"), now reopened after reconstruction in the wake of a World War II bombing. It is the home of the Marche Philharmonic Orchestra. The town of Jesi has the Teatro Pergolesi and supports the Pergolesi Foundation, both named for this "favorite son" composer and one of the great names in the music of the 18th century in Italy.

Ascoli Piceno is the site of the historic Teatro Ventidio Basso whereas Fermo is home to Teatro dell'Aquila and a new music conservatory. The town of Fermo is home to the International Orchestra of Italy, a fine private orchestra with a 20-year history of concerts in Italy and abroad. Macerata is the site of the remarkable Arena Sferisterio. Flanked by neo-classical columns, it is an outdoor venue for music, or almost anything else, having been built in the 1820s as a sports field. The town of Civitanova Marche has the S. Giacomo Auditorium, which hosts an annual festival of contemporary music.

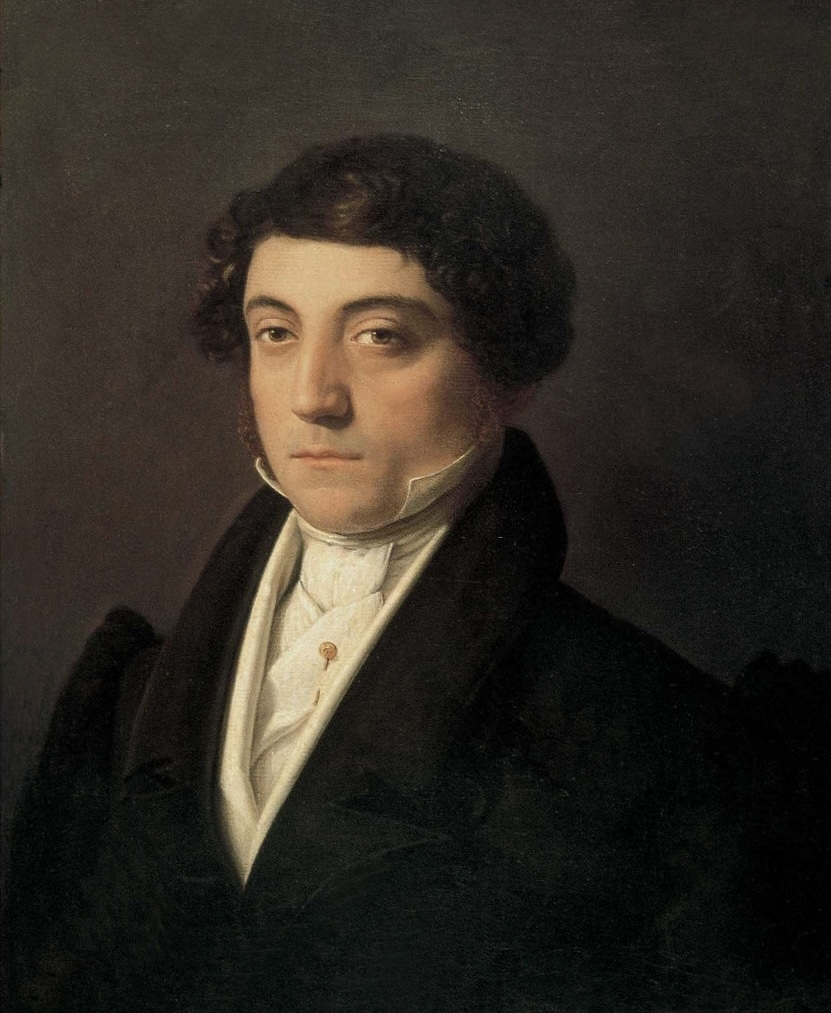
Gioachino Rossini, c. 1815 (portrait by Vincenzo Camuccini)

The town of Pesaro is the birthplace of Rossini, one of the giants of Italian music. As one might expect, many things are named for him, including the Teatro Rossini and the Rossini Conservatory. His birthplace is marked, as well, and the Rossini Foundation sponsors an annual festival dedicated to his music. The town of Urbino has the Teatro Sanzio, built in the 1840s, and the town of Fano has an important Jazz Festival each year.
