= Agnes von Hohenstaufen =

Opera by Gaspare Spontini

- Opera by Gaspare Spontini
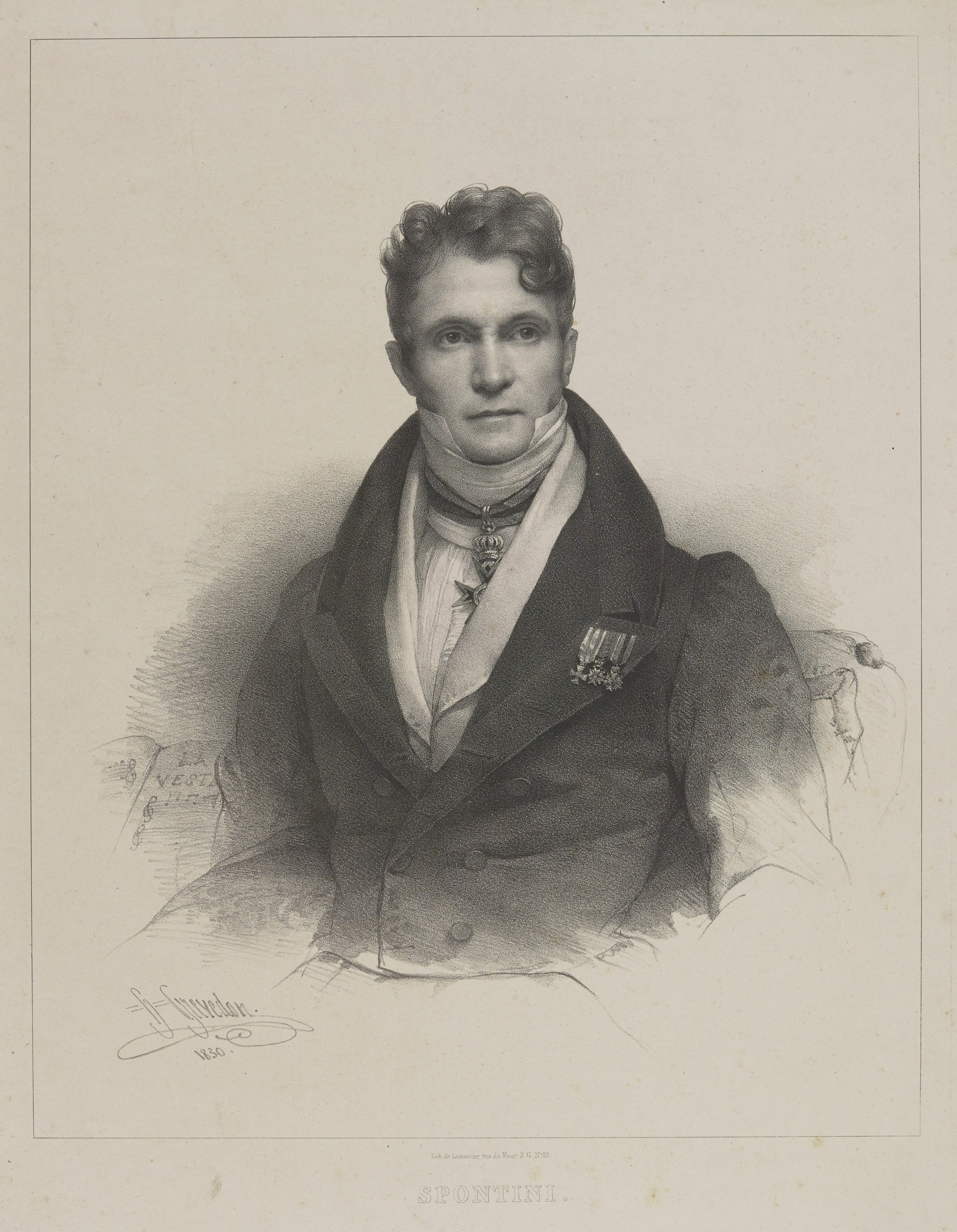
- The composer
- Librettist: Ernst Benjamin Salomo Raupach
- Language: German
- Premiere: 12 June 1829; Königliches Opernhaus, Berlin

Agnes von Hohenstaufen is a German-language opera in three acts by the Italian composer Gaspare Spontini, the last opera he composed. The German libretto is by Ernst Benjamin Salomo Raupach. It was first staged at the Königliches Opernhaus, Berlin, on 12 June 1829. Raupach categorised Agnes von Hohenstaufen as a historical-romantic opera and it is one of a number of German works of the time set in the Middle Ages (others include Weber's Euryanthe, Wagner's Tannhäuser and Lohengrin and Schumann's Genoveva). Agnes also contains many of the features that would be characteristic of French Grand Opera. Spontini substantially reworked the piece for a revival in 1837.

== Roles ==
Role	Voice type	Premiere Cast
Agnes von Hohenstaufen	soprano	Pauline von Schätzel
Irmengard	soprano	Pauline Anna Milder-Hauptmann
Philipp von Hohenstaufen	tenor	Heinrich Stürmer
Heinrich Braunschweig "Palatinus"	tenor	Karl Adam Bader
Philipp August	baritone	Eduard Devrient
Conrad von Hohenstaufen	bass	Julius Eberhard Busolt
Kaiser Heinrich VI	bass	Heinrich Blume

== Synopsis ==
Place: Germany
Time: The Middle Ages

=== Act 1 ===
The action concerns the struggle between the Holy Roman Emperor Henry VI (Heinrich VI) and the leader of the noble Welf faction, Henry the Lion (Heinrich der Löwe). The first act is set in Mainz where the emperor has assembled his forces to march against the Welfs:

German

Es schwebe der Adler
Des heiligen Reiches,
Mit siegenden Schwingen
In Welschlands Gefild!
Er bringe Verderben
Dem Meutrergeschlechte,
Und werde den Treuen
Ein deckender Schild!

English

The eagle of the
Holy empire may float
With victorious wings
To Italy!
May he bring decay
To the traitorous family,
And may he become a protecting
Shield to all loyal men.

Agnes of Hohenstaufen, the emperor's cousin, is engaged to be married to the son of Henry the Lion, Henry "Palatinus", but the war brings this alliance into doubt. Henry arrives at Mainz disguised as a troubadour. The French ambassador proposes that Agnes should be married to his king, Philip II Augustus (Philipp August), instead. The emperor agrees and the betrothal is announced at a banquet. Henry, unable to bear the French ambassador's flirting with Agnes, is moved to anger and his true identity is revealed. The emperor condemns him to death and banishes Agnes to a convent. This highhandedness provokes a mutiny amongst some of the nobles.

=== Act 2 ===
Henry is offered his life providing he renounces Agnes and goes into exile. He angrily rejects these terms just as the mutinous nobles burst in. Henry tries to escape in the confusion but is captured by the French ambassador, who proposes that they should fight a duel the next day. The emperor agrees but gives secret orders to have Henry killed during an escape bid. Henry does indeed manage to break out of prison and reach Agnes in church, where the two are quickly married. The French ambassador is furious and only the intervention of the archbishop prevents a duel in church.

=== Act 3 ===
Henry and Agnes plan to flee to the army of Henry the Lion, but they are captured. Henry agrees to fight the duel with the French ambassador and mortally wounds him. He is revealed to be none other than King Philip Augustus himself, who had wanted to see his betrothed before the marriage. Irmengard, Agnes's mother, now announces that the wedding between Henry and her daughter has already taken place. The emperor is furious but he provokes another mutiny among the nobles. Henry unexpectedly draws his sword to defend the emperor's authority.

German	English
Heinrich zu den Fürsten, von denen mehrere gegen den Kaiser vordringen, indem er mit gezogenem Schwert vor ihn tritt, um ihn zu schützen. Erst soll, wer ihn berührt, mein Blut verspritzen!	Henry protecting the emperor with his drawn sword and saying to the princes, several of whom are heading towards the emperor. He who touches him must spill my blood at first.
Fürsten und deutsche Ritter zu Heinrich. Wie? – der dich morden will, den willst du schützen?	Princes and German knights to Henry. Pardon? – You protect him who wants to murder you?
Philipp. Treu bleibt er, wo man heil'ge Eide bricht!	Philipp. He remains faithful when others break holy oaths!
Kaiser das Schwert ziehend. Rebellen! weicht zurück! – – –	Emperor drawing his sword. Rebels! Back off! – – –
Heinrich zu den Fürsten. Ja, freudig geb' ich hin mein Haupt, dass ihr Dem Kaiser nicht die Fürstentreue brecht. Mit tiefster Wehmut den Blick gen Himmel gerichtet. O teurer Vater! – O geliebte Gattin! – Lebt ewig wohl! Schreitet entschlossen auf die Trabanten zu, um sich ihnen zu übergeben. Jetzt fort zum Tode!	Henry to the princes. Yes, I gladly give away my head in order to prevent You from breaking the loyalty you owe to the emperor. With deep woefulness I direct my gaze to the sky. O dear father! – O beloved spouse! – Farewell! Paces determinedly to the knights who surround him. Now to death!

At this point Henry the Lion arrives in person to announce his army has taken Mainz, but he too offers his submission to the emperor. The dying French king pardons the young Henry. The emperor blesses the married couple and encourages his subjects to unite for an expedition to Italy.

== Modern performances ==
Although the original libretto is in German, only Italian-language versions of the opera have hitherto been recorded and filmed.

The opera was mounted at the Maggio Musicale Fiorentino in 1954 (in Italian) under Vittorio Gui, and again in 1974 with Leyla Gencer in the title role and Riccardo Muti conducting. For the first time since the 19th century the opera was heard in its original German (and with a recently unearthed overture) at Erfurt in June 2018 with Claudia Sorokina as Agnes and conducted by Zoi Tsokanou.

== See also ==
- Germania
- Günther von Schwarzburg
- Die Rheinnixen
- Lohengrin
