= Giangiacomo Guelfi =

Italian opera singer

- Giangiacomo Guelfi (photo with 1952 dedication)
- Born: December 21, 1924; Rome, Italy
- Died: 8 February 2012 (aged 87); Bolzano, Italy
- Occupation: Opera singer (Baritone)

Giangiacomo Guelfi (21 December 1924 – 8 February 2012) was an Italian operatic baritone, particularly associated with Verdi and Puccini.

Born in Rome, Guelfi studied law before turning to vocal studies in Florence with baritone Titta Ruffo and later in Milan with baritone Mario Basiola. He made his stage debut in Spoleto, as Rigoletto in 1950. He made his debut in 1952 at the Teatro alla Scala in Milan, also appearing in Venice, Florence, Rome, Naples, Palermo, Catania, and becoming a regular guest at the Arena di Verona. Outside Italy he appeared in Berlin, Lisbon, London, Buenos Aires, Rio de Janeiro, Madrid, and Cairo. He made his American debut in 1954 at the Lyric Opera of Chicago, and at the Metropolitan Opera of New York in 1970. He took part in the creation of contemporary works including Lazzaro in Pizzetti's La figlia di Jorio, Naples, 1954. He was mostly known for his Verdi portrayals in operas such as Nabucco, I due Foscari, Attila, Macbeth, Il trovatore, I vespri siciliani, La forza del destino, and Aida. He also appeared in verismo operas such as Cavalleria rusticana, Andrea Chénier, Tosca, and La fanciulla del West.

Guelfi had a large, powerful voice and yet was able to perform more classical works such as Guglielmo Tell, Lucia di Lammermoor, La favorite, L'Africaine, and Spontini's Agnes von Hohenstaufen.

He sang the role of Rance in La fanciulla del West in a recording with Renata Tebaldi, conducted by Arturo Basile, and was in the 1961 Tokyo's performances of Tosca, also with Tebaldi, on DVD.

He died on 8 February 2012 in Bolzano, after a week's hospitalization.

== Sources ==
- Le guide de l'opéra, les indispensables de la musique, R. Mancini & J-J. Rouvereux, (Fayard, 1986), ISBN 2-213-01563-5
