= Antonietta Stella =

Italian operatic soprano (1929–2022)

- Stella in 1951
- Born: Maria Antonietta Stella; 15 March 1929; Perugia, Umbria, Italy
- Died: 23 February 2022 (aged 92); Rome, Lazio, Italy
- Education: Conservatorio Francesco Morlacchi; Accademia Nazionale di Santa Cecilia
- Occupation: Operatic soprano

Maria Antonietta Stella (15 March 1929 – 23 February 2022) was an Italian operatic soprano, and one of the most prominent Italian spinto sopranos of the 1950s and 1960s. She made her debut in Spoleto in 1950, as Leonora in Verdi's Il trovatore, a year later at Rome Opera, as Leonora in La forza del destino, in 1954 at La Scala in Milan, as Desdemona in Otello, in 1955 at the Royal Opera House in London as Aida, and in 1956 at the Metropolitan Opera in New York City, in the same role.

== Life and career ==
Born in Perugia, Stella studied at the Conservatorio Francesco Morlacchi in her home town and at the Accademia Nazionale di Santa Cecilia in Rome, and made her debut in Spoleto, as Leonora in Verdi's Il trovatore, in 1950. The tenor Giuseppe Treppaciani was her partner on stage, and later became her husband. She appeared at the Rome Opera in 1951, as Leonora in Verdi's La forza del destino alongside Mario Del Monaco. The same year, she appeared in Germany at the Staatstheater Stuttgart, the Bavarian State Opera and the Staatstheater Wiesbaden.

She quickly sang throughout Italy: Florence, Naples, Parma, Turin, Catania, Venice, among others. She made her La Scala debut in 1954 as Desdemona in Verdi's Otello, where she then sang regularly until 1963, to great acclaim, in Verdi roles such as Violetta in La traviata, Elisabetta in Don Carlos, and the title roles in Aida, in Puccini's Tosca, Mimí in La bohème and Cio-Cio-San in Madama Butterfly. She also performed there as Donna Anna in Mozart's Don Giovanni and Puccini's Suor Angelica. She appeared at the Arena di Verona first in 1953, then in 1955 as Aida and Leonora in La forza del destino, and in more leading roles until 1964.

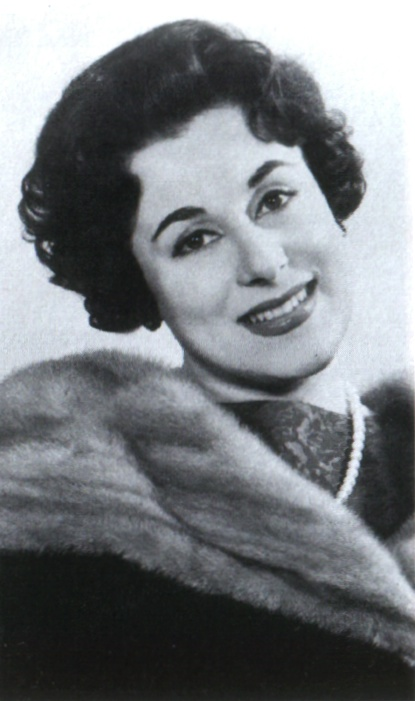
Stella in the 1960s

In 1955, she made her debut at the Royal Opera House in London as Aida, also at La Monnaie in Brussels, the Lyric Opera of Chicago, and the Vienna State Opera, where she performed many of her leading Verdi and Puccini roles, and additionally as Maddalena in Giordano's Andrea Chénier and as Santuzza in Mascagni's Cavalleria rusticana. In 1956, she first appeared at the Metropolitan Opera (Met) in New York City, again as Aida. She sang alongside Fedora Barbieri as Amneris, Carlo Bergonzi as Radames who also made his house debut, and George London as Amonasro, conducted by Fausto Cleva. A review from the New York Journal-American noted that she was a significant addition to the Met, and detailed:

... she is prodigal of voice and talented in acting. In using too much power, she endangered the quality of her voice, and in singing her big arias she appeared dramatic without always moving the listener. Her pianissimo singing was beautiful, her range of dynamics impressive, and her bearing that of a princess, as handsome in looks as in action.

She performed there successfully until 1960, in eight roles in 71 performances, including Leonora in Il trovatore, Amelia in Verdi's Un ballo in maschera, Tosca, and Elisabetta. In 1958 she had a particular success in a new Metropolitan production of Madama Butterfly designed in the manner of Japanese woodblock prints. Her assimilation of Japanese physicality and gesture was particularly praised. Her Leonore in Il trovatore was also presented in a new production at the Metropolitan in 1958 to public and critical acclaim.

In 1970, she appeared in Rome as Irmengarda in Spontini's Agnes von Hohenstaufen, conducted by Riccardo Muti. She appeared in the title role in the world premiere of Maria Stuarda by Enzo De Bellis at the Teatro di San Carlo in Naples in 1974.

She had a significant career of her own and left several recordings, including of works such as Donizetti's Linda di Chamounix, Meyerbeer's L'Africaine, and Verdi's La battaglia di Legnano and Simon Boccanegra. She appeared in an Italian television production of Andrea Chénier, alongside Mario Del Monaco and Giuseppe Taddei in 1955, since released on DVD. She was heard on an Italian radio broadcast of Spontini's Agnes von Hohenstaufen, opposite Montserrat Caballé,

Stella died in Rome on 23 February 2022, at the age of 92.

== Recordings ==
- Donizetti – Linda di Chamounix – Tullio Serafin (Philips, 1956)
- Verdi – Il trovatore – Serafin (DG, 1962)
- Verdi – La traviata – Serafin (EMI, 1955)
- Verdi – Un ballo in maschera – Gianandrea Gavazzeni (DG, 1960)
- Verdi – Don Carlo – Gabriele Santini (EMI, 1954)
- Verdi – Don Carlo – Santini (DG, 1961)
- Giordano – Andrea Chénier – Santini (EMI, 1964)
- Puccini - La bohème - Molinari-Pradelli (Philips, 1957)
- Puccini – Tosca – Serafin (Philips, 1957)
