= Maggio Musicale Fiorentino =

Music festival

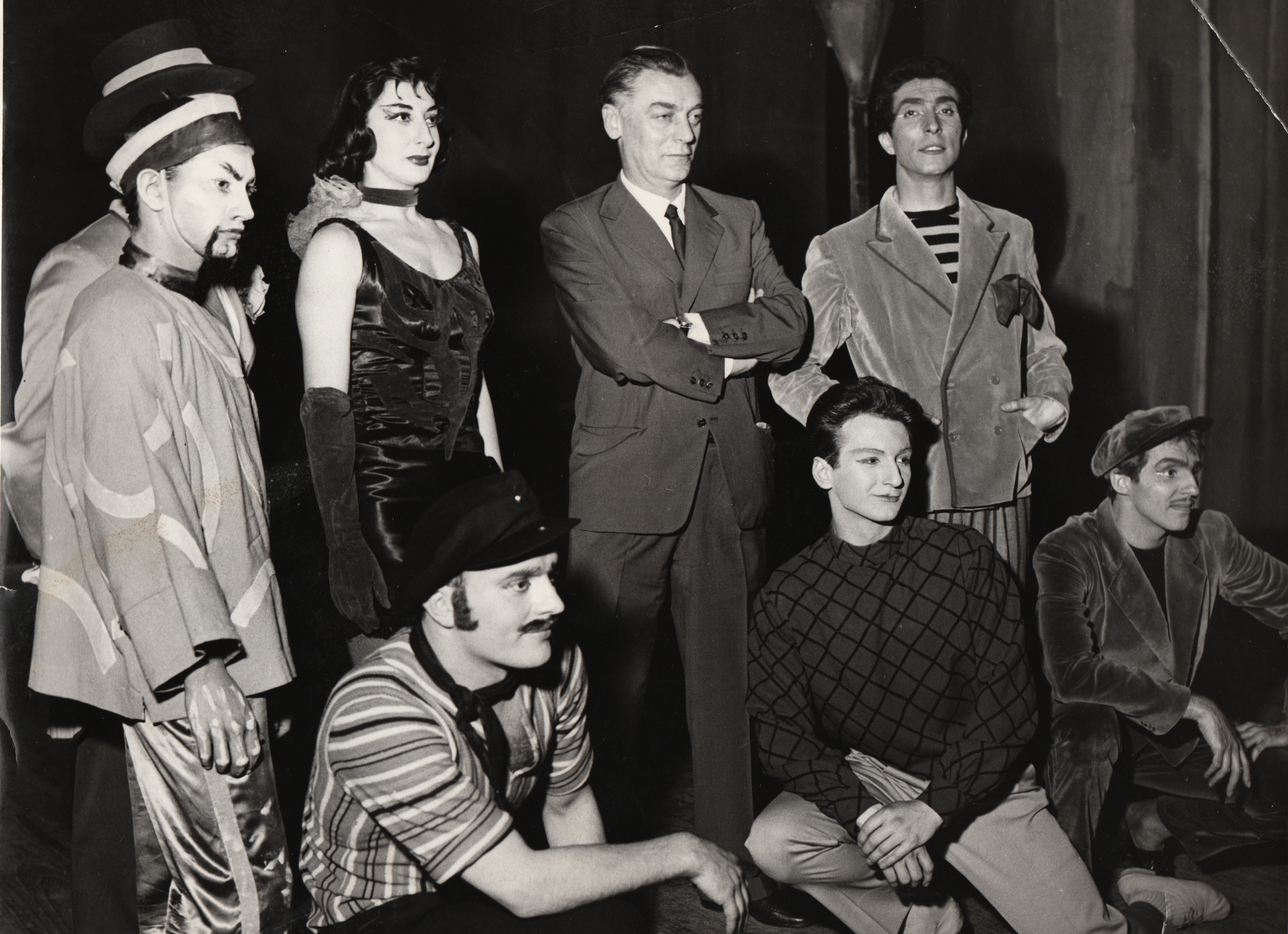

The Maggio Musicale Fiorentino (literal English translation: 'Florence Musical May') is an annual Italian arts festival in Florence, including a notable opera festival, under the auspices of the Opera di Firenze. The festival occurs between late April into June annually, typically with four operas.

== History ==
In April 1933, on Luigi Ridolfi Vay da Verrazzano's idea, Vittorio Gui founded the festival, with the aim of presenting contemporary and forgotten operas in visually dramatic productions. It was the first music festival in Italy and the oldest in Europe after the Salzburg Festival. The first opera presented was Verdi's early Nabucco, his early operas then being rarely staged. The first festival's success, which included two performances of Spontini's La Vestale with Rosa Ponselle, led to it becoming a biennial event in 1937 with the presentation of nine operas. After 1937, it became an annual festival, except during World War II. Performances took place in the Teatro Comunale and Piccolo Teatro, plus the Teatro della Pergola. A new opera house, the Teatro dell'Opera di Firenze, was inaugurated in 2011 and permanently replaced the former Teatro Comunale in 2014.

Former musical directors were Vittorio Gui (1928-1936), Mario Rossi (1937-1946), Bruno Bartoletti (1957-1964), and Riccardo Muti (1969-1981). Zubin Mehta became principal conductor in 1985, and now has the title of honorary conductor for life. In January 2016, the Opera di Firenze announced the appointment of Fabio Luisi as music director of the festival, the first conductor to hold that title, as of April 2018, with an initial contract of 5 years. In July 2019, Luisi resigned as music director of the Maggio Musicale Fiorentino with immediate effect.

In July 2021, the festival announced the appointment of Daniele Gatti as its next principal conductor, effective March 2022, with an initial contract of 3 years. In June 2025, the festival announced the promotion of Gatti's title from principal conductor to music director, as of the 2026 season, with an initial contract of 3 years.

== See also ==
- List of opera festivals

== Sources ==
- Lynn, Karyl Charna, Italian Opera Houses and Festivals, Lanham, Maryland: The Scarecrow Press, Inc., 2005. ISBN 0-8108-5359-0
