= Jolanda Meneguzzer =

Italian operatic soprano (1929–2020)

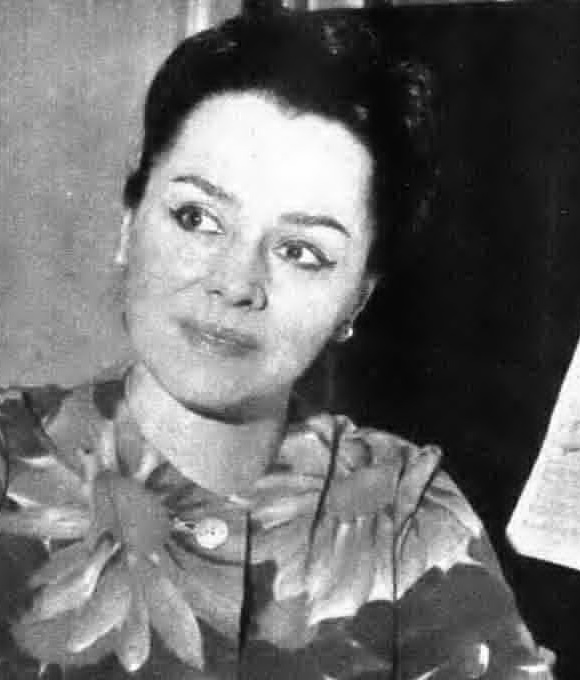
- Meneguzzer in Radiocorriere magazine (1973)
- Born: 16 January 1929; Cantù, Como, Kingdom of Italy
- Died: 6 June 2020 (aged 91); Florence, Italy
- Occupation: Lyric soprano singer

Jolanda Meneguzzer (1929 – 2020) was an Italian lyric soprano who made regular appearances at leading opera houses in the 1960s.

== Biography ==
Jolanda Meneguzzer was born on January 16, 1929, in Cantù, Como, Lombardy, to Augusto Meneguzzer and Mafalda Zonaro, the daughter of the Italian painter Fausto Zonaro.

Her mother, a pianist, taught her how to play the piano when she was four and a half years old. Her parents often took her to La Scala in Milan where she developed her love of opera. She was a pupil of Nerina Baldisseri, whose mother had been a pupil of Mathilde Marchesi.

In June 1957, she made her debut singing Euridice in Monteverdi's L'Orfeo at the Maggio Musicale Fiorentino in Florence.

In Turin in February 1965, she performed and recorded Thamos, King of Egypt with Carlo Maria Giulini and the Symphony Orchestra of the RAI. She also recorded Mozart's Exsultate Jubilate, K. 165, with the same orchestra and conductor.

In the 1960s, she made regular guest appearances at the leading Italian opera houses, such as La Scala in Milan, the Teatro Comunale in Florence, the Teatro La Fenice in Venice, the Teatro Verdi in Trieste, the Teatro Comunale in Bologna, the Rome Opera, the Teatro Petruzzelli in Bari and the Teatro San Carlo in Naples.

She also appeared at the Metropolitan Opera House in New York, as well as the San Francisco Opera, making her American debut there in 1962 as Maria in Donizetti's La Fille du Régiment. The San Francisco Opera impresario, Kurt Herbert Adler asked her to take over the roles that Graziella Sciutti was originally scheduled to sing in 1962, which led to engagements in San Francisco for the 1963 and 1965 seasons.

In 1960, she worked with Franco Zeffirelli, with whom she had been at Art College in Florence, in his direction of Euridice by Jacopo Peri.

In October 1962, at the San Francisco Opera, she performed the role of Zerlina in the cast of Mozart's Don Giovanni in which the American bass Giorgio Tozzi was the Don, Spanish soprano Victoria de los Angeles was Donna Anna, German soprano Elizabeth Schwarzkopf was Donna Elvira, and Sir Geraint Evans was Leporello. She appeared at the Cincinnati Opera House in 1965 and the Los Angeles Opera in the same year.

She performed the leading role of Marie in a concert performance of La fille du régiment at the Royal Festival Hall in London in February 1963, to much acclaim. The Stage critic stated: "Let Glyndebourne now do it, and let them put Jolanda Meneguzzer in the title role." He went on to say that her performance had, "musical sensitivity and coloratura ease...and a pert comical charm that could be devastating in the opera house."

In 1966, she appeared in La Fantarca, a one-act television opera by Roman Vlad with a libretto by Giuseppe Berto and Pier Benedetto Bertoli, based on the short story of the same name by Giuseppe Berto.

She sang the role of Autonoe in the Italian premiere of Hans Werner Henze's The Bassarids in 1968.

She performed with the leading opera singers of the time such as Tito Gobbi, Joan Sutherland, Elizabeth Schwarzkopf, Renata Tebaldi,Hermann Prey, Geraint Evans, Victoria De Los Angeles, Fedora Barbieri, Adriana Lazzarini, Giulietta Simionato, Rosanna Carteri, Rolando Panerai, Renato Capecchi, Carlo Bergonzi, Luigi Alva, Paolo Montarsolo, Giuseppe Taddei, Sesto Bruscantini, Giuseppe Di Stefano, Italo Tajo, Ruggero Raimondi, Kostas Paskalis, Reri Grist, Marcella Pobbe, Leontyne Price, Renata Scotto, Gianni Poggi and Giuseppe Modesti.

Jolanda Meneguzzer (centre right) as Lucia, on stage after a performance of Lucia di Lammermoor at the Gaiety Theatre, Dublin in 1967. Photo courtesy of Opera in Ireland.

Her operatic career slowed down in the early 1970s when she then devoted herself to teaching. She also gave opera workshops to graduate students at the Villa Schifanoia in Florence, working alongside Tito Gobbi, William Weaver and Ernesto Barbini. Among her students there are the two italian sopranos twins Paola Cigna and Patrizia Cigna, the tenor Gianluca Sorrentino, the american soprano Alexis Magaro.

Her voice was heard on Italian Radio throughout the 60s, 70s, 80s and into the 90s, in operatic performances and song recitals.

There exists on archive.org, an audio recording from 1967, when Meneguzzer was engaged by the Dublin Grand Opera Society to sing Lucia in Gaetano Donizetti's Lucia di Lammermoor (Audio recording of Lucia di Lammermoor. Presented on May 31, Jun 2, 7, 13, 1967 at the Gaiety Theatre, Dublin as part of the Dublin Grand Opera Society’s Spring Season).

Jolanda Menguzzer died on 6 June 2020 in Florence.

== Operatic roles: 1957 (debut) – 1976 ==
=== 1957 ===
Orfeo (Monteverdi) – Florence – Maggio Musicale Fiorentino – Boboli Gardens. Role: Euridice. Cast: Giuseppe Valdengo (Orfeo), Lucilla Udovich (Musica, Proserpina), Paolo Washington (Plutone). Conductor: Emidio Tieri. Director: Aurel Milloss.

Il Re del dolore (Antonio Caldara) – Perugia - XII Sagra Musicale Umbra – Teatro Morlacchi. Role: Angelo. Cast: Lucilla Udovich, Alvinio Misciano, Irene Companeez, Fernando Corena. Conductor: Bruno Bartoletti. Reprised at: Venice – Basilica Di San Giorgio Maggiore.

=== 1958 ===
Turandot (Puccini) – Florence – Maggio Musicale Fiorentino – Boboli Gardens. Role: Liú. Cast: Gertrud Grob-Prandl (Turandot), Gastone Limarilli (Calaf), Paolo Washington (Timur), Renato Capecchi (Ping). Conductor: Gabriele Santini. Director: Aurel Milloss.

Gianni Schicchi (Puccini) – Siena – Teatro dei Rinnovati – Accademia Musicale Chigiana. Role: Lauretta. Cast: Paolo Pedani (Gianni Schicchi), Ferrero Poggi (Rinuccio). Conductor: Bruno Rigacci. Director: Giovacchino Forzano.

=== 1959 ===
Orlando (Händel) – Florence – Maggio Musicale Fiorentino – Teatro La Pergola. Role: Dorinda. Cast: Rosanna Carteri (Angelica), Irene Companeez (Medoro), Scipio Colombo (Orlando), Paolo Washington (Zoroastro). Conductor: Bruno Rigacci. Director: Mario Ferrero.

L'ajo nell'imbarazzo (Donizetti) – Bergamo: Teatro Donizetti. Role: Gilda. Cast: Renato Capecchi (L’ajo), Salvatore Gioia (Enrico). Conductor: Adolfo Camozzo. Director: Fantasio Piccoli.

Il barbiere di Siviglia (Rossini) – Reggio Emilia: Teatro Municipale. Role: Rosina. Cast: Giuseppe Taddei (Figaro), Nicola Monti (Almaviva), Alfredo Mariotti (Bartolo), Italo Tajo (Basilio). Conductor: Mario Parenti. Director: Domenico Messina.

Il barbiere di Siviglia (Rossini) – Graz: Opernhaus. Role: Rosina. Cast: Walter Monachesi (Figaro), Salvatore Gioia (Almaviva). Conductor: Massimo Pradella. Director: Federico Wolf-Ferrari.

La bohème (Puccini). Role: Mimí. Cast: Costanze Gero (Rodolfo), Alberta Hopkins (Musetta), Giorgio Giorgetti (Marcello). Conductor: Erasmo Ghiglia.

=== 1960 ===
Lo frate 'nnamorato (Pergolesi) – Milan: Piccola Scala. Role: Nena. Cast: Dora Gatta (Vannella), Adriana Martino (Cardella), Fiorenza Cossotto (Lucrezia), Biancamaria Casoni (Nina), Paolo Montarsolo (Maresciallo), Paolo Pedani (Pietro), Alvinio Misciano (Ascanio). Conductor: Bruno Bartoletti. Director: Franco Zeffirelli.

Euridice (Peri) – Florence – Maggio Musicale Fiorentino – Boboli Gardens. Role: Euridice. Cast: Laura Londi (Ninfa), Marco Stecchi (Orfeo), Paolo Washington (Plutone), Alfredo Bianchini (Tirsi). Conductor: Bruno Rigacci. Director: Franco Zeffirelli.

Lo frate ‘nnamorato (Pergolesi) – Jesi: Teatro Pergolesi. Role: Nena. Cast: Dora Gatta (Vannella), Adriana Martino (Cardella), Fiorenza Cossotto (Lucrezia), Biancamaria Casoni (Nina), Paolo Montarsolo (Maresciallo), Paolo Pedani (Pietro), Alvino Misciano (Ascanio). Conductor: Bruno Bartoletti. Director: Franco Zeffirelli.

Il barbiere di Siviglia (Rossini) – Copenhagen: Teatro Falkoner. Role: Rosina. Cast: Attilio D’Orazi (Figaro), Amilcare Blaffard (Almaviva). Conductor: Manno Wolf-Ferrari. Director: Bruno Nofri.

Rigoletto (Verdi) – Hamburg: Operettenhaus. Role: Gilda. Cast: Walter Monachesi (Rigoletto), Giuseppe Savio (Il Duca). Conductor: Franco Mannino. Director: Renzo Frusca.

Lucia di Lammermoor (Donizetti) – Rome: Teatro dell’Opera. Role: Lucia. Cast: Enzo Tei (Edgardo), Antonio Boyer (Enrico). Conductor: Armando La Rosa Parodi. Director: Bruno Nofri.

La contadina astuta (Pergolesi). Role: Scintilla. Cast: Ugo Trama (Don Tabarrano). Conductor: Angelo Ephrikian. Recording in Florence, Solisti Del Maggio Musicale Fiorentino.

Rigoletto (Verdi) – Lyon: Opéra. Role: Gilda. Cast: Umberto Borghi (Rigoletto) Giuseppe Moretti (Il Duca), Guido Carli (Monterone). Conductor: Giuseppe Morelli.

=== 1961 ===
Il mercante di Venezia (Castelnuovo Tedesco) – Florence – Maggio Musicale Fiorentino – Teatro Comunale (Premiere). Role: Gessica. Cast: Renato Capecchi (Shylock), Rosanna Carteri (Porzia), Renata Ongaro (Nerissa), Giuseppe Baratti (Lorenzo), Marco Stecchi (Graziano). Conductor: Franco Capuana. Director: Margherita Wallmann.

Il barbiere di Siviglia (Rossini) – Florence: Teatro Comunale. Role: Rosina. Cast: Renato Capecchi (Figaro), Enrico Campi (Bartolo), Giuseppe Baratti (Almaviva), Paolo Montarsolo (Basilio). Conductor: Bruno Rigacci. Director: Raoul Farolfi.

L’elisir d’amore (Donizetti) – Florence: Teatro Comunale. Role: Adina. Cast: Luigi Alva (Nemorino), Aurelio Oppicelli (Belcore), Paolo Montarsolo (Dulcamara). Conductor: Bruno Bartoletti. Director: Beppe Menegatti.

Rita (Donizetti). Role: Rita. Cast: Carlo Franzini (Beppe), Filippo Maero (Gasparo). Conductor: Arturo Basile. Recording, Milan, Studi RAI.

Falstaff (Verdi) – Siena – Teatro dei Rinnovati. Role: Nannetta. Cast: Mariano Stabile (Falstaff), Marcella Pobbe (Alice), Fedora Barbieri (Quickly), Giuseppe Baratti (Fenton), Giulio Fioravanti (Ford). Conductor: Franco Capuana. Director: Mariano Stabile.

La bohème (Puccini). Role: Musetta. Cast: Renata Scotto (Mimí), Gianni Poggi (Rodolfo), Tito Gobbi (Marcello), Giorgio Giorgetti (Schaunard), Giuseppe Modesti (Colline). Conductor: Antonino Votto. Recording for Deutsche Grammophon, Florence.

La bohème (Puccini) – Genoa: Teatro Genovese. Role: Musetta. Cast: Dora Carral (Mimí), Mario Binci (Rodolfo). Conductor: Glauco Curiel. Director: Renzo Frusca.

L'occasione fa il ladro (Rossini). Role: Berenice. Cast: Nestore Catalani (Don Parmenione), Juan Oncina (Alberto), Fernando Corena (Martino). Conductor: Edwin Loehrer. Registrazione, Lugano, Radio Monte Ceneri.

Euridice (Peri) – Berlin, Festival, Charlottenburger Schloss. Role: Euridice. Conductor: Rolf Rapp.

=== 1962 ===
The nightingale (Stravinsky) – Rome – Teatro dell’Opera. Role: Rossignol Cast: Giuseppe Baratti (The Fisherman), Fernanda Cadoni (The Cook), Plinio Clabassi (The Emperor). Conductor: Armando La Rosa Parodi. Director: Alessandro Manetti.

Die Entführung aus dem Serail (Mozart) – Genoa: Teatro Carlo Felice. Role: Blonde. Cast: Virginia Gordoni (Konstanze), Petre Munteanu (Belmonte), Luigi Pontiggia (Pedrillo), Elfego Esparza (Osmin). Conductor: Francesco Molinari-Pradelli. Director: Paul Hager.

La molinara (Paisiello) – Florence – Maggio Musicale Fiorentino – Teatro La Pergola. Role: Eugenia. Cast: Adriana Martino (Rachelina), Paolo Montarsolo (Pistofolo), Nicola Monti (Don Luigino), Biancamaria Casoni (Amaranta). Conductor: Bruno Bartoletti. Director: Tatyana Pavlova.

La Bohème (Puccini) – Florence: Teatro Comunale. Role: Musetta. Cast: Renata Tebaldi (Mimí), Renato Cioni (Rodolfo), Rolando Panerai (Marcello), Giorgio Giorgetti (Schaunard), Nicola Zaccaria (Colline). Conductor: Tullio Serafin. Director: Tullio Serafin.

Lucia di Lammermoor (Donizetti) – La Coruña: X Festival De Los Amigos De La Ópera – Teatro Colòn. Role: Lucia. Cast: Angelo Marchiandi (Edgardo), Walter Monachesi (Enrico). Conductor: Josè Luis Lloret. Director: Angel Anglada. Reprised At: Vigo - V Festival De Opera, Teatro Garcia Barbon.

La sonnambula (Bellini) - La Coruña: X Festival De Los Amigos De La Ópera – Teatro Colòn. Role: Amina. Cast: Anna Gasparini (Lisa), Pierre Duval (Elvino), Enrique Yebra (Rodolfo). Conductor: Josè Luis Lloret. Director: Angel Anglada.

La fille du régiment (Donizetti) – San Francisco Opera House. Role: Maria. Cast: Soňa Červená (Marchesa), Salvatore Baccaloni (Sulpizio), Renato Cioni (Tonio). Conductor: Oliviero De Fabritiis. Director: Tito Capobianco. Reprised At: Los Angeles - Shrine Auditorium.

Falstaff (Verdi) – San Francisco Opera House. Role: Nannetta. Cast: Geraint Evans (Falstaff), Wilma Lipp (Alice), Giulietta Simionato (Quickly), Glade Peterson (Fenton). Conductor: János Ferencsik. Director: Paul Hager. Reprised At: Los Angeles - Shrine Auditorium.

Don Giovanni (Mozart) – San Francisco Opera House. Role: Zerlina. Cast: Giorgio Tozzi (Don Giovanni), Victoria De Los Angeles (Donna Anna), Geraint Evans (Leporello), Elisabeth Schwarzkopf (Donna Elvira). Conductor: Leopold Ludwig. Director : Paul Hager. Reprised At: Los Angeles - Shrine Auditorium; San Diego - The San Diego Opera Guild.

Orlando (Händel). Role: Dorinda. Cast: Mario Borriello (Orlando), Laura Londi (Angelica), Biancamaria Casoni (Medoro), Ugo Trama (Zoroastro). Conductor: Bruno Rigacci. Recorded in Milan, Studi Della RAI.

La bohème (Puccini) – Naples: Teatro di S. Carlo. Role: Musetta. Cast: Onelia Fineschi (Mimí), Giuseppe Gismondo (Rodolfo), Walter Alberti (Marcello). Conductor: Ugo Rapalo. Director: Livio Luzzatto.

La bohème (Puccini) – Rome : Teatro dell’Opera. Role: Musetta. Cast: Onelia Fineschi (Mimí), Giuseppe Gismondo (Rodolfo), Antonio Boyer (Marcello), Plinio Clabassi (Colline). Conductor: Oliviero De Fabritiis. Director: Bruno Nofri.

=== 1963 ===
Faust (Gounod) – Reggio Emilia: Teatro Valli. Role: Margherita. Cast: Flaviano Labò (Faust), Raffaele Arié (Mefistofele), Remo Iori (Valentino). Conductor: Claudio Abbado. Director: Enrico Frigerio.

La fille du régiment (Donizetti) – London: Royal Festival Hall. Role: Maria. Cast: Monica Sinclair (Marchesa), Giuseppe Baratti (Tonio), Renato Capecchi (Sulpizio). Conductor: Bryan Balkwill. Director: Peter Ebert.

La bohème (Puccini) – Turin: Teatro Regio. Role: Musetta. Cast: Mietta Sighele (Mimí), Giuseppe Di Stefano (Rodolfo), Guido Mazzini (Marcello), Ivo Vinco (Colline). Conductor: Francesco Molinari Pradelli. Director: Carlo Piccinato.

Gianni Schicchi (Puccini) – Rome: Teatro dell’Opera. Role: Lauretta. Cast: Sesto Bruscantini (Gianni Schicchi), Angelo Manchiardi (Rinuccio), Italo Tajo (Simone), Elena Zilio (La Ciesca). Conductor: Nino Bonavolontá. Director: Giovacchino Forzano.

Rigoletto (Verdi) – New York: Metropolitan Opera. Role: Gilda. Cast: Robert Merrill (Rigoletto), Barry Morell (Il Duca), Ezio Flagello (Sparafucile). Conductor: Fausto Cleva. Director: Herbert Graf.

La sonnambula (Bellini) – San Francisco Opera House. Role: Lisa. Cast: Joan Sutherland (Amina), Renato Cioni (Elvino). Conductor: Richard Bonynge. Director: Lofti Mansouri. Reprised At: Los Angeles - Shrine Auditorium.

Falstaff (Verdi) – San Francisco Opera House. Role: Nannetta. Cast: Geraint Evans (Falstaff), Sona Cervena (Quickly), Glade Peterson (Fenton). Conductor: Janos Ferencsik. Director: Paul Hager. Reprised At: Los Angeles - Shrine Auditorium; Berkeley Campus: William Randolph Hearst Greek Theatre; San Diego: The San Diego Opera Guild.

Capriccio (Strauss) – San Francisco Opera House. Role: Eine Italienische Sängerin. Cast: Elisabeth Schwarzkopf (Die Grafïn), Cesare Valletti (Flamand), Sona Cervena (Clairon), Hermann Prey (Olivier), Glade Peterson (Ein Italienischer Tenor). Conductor: Georges Prêtre. Director: Paul Hager. Reprised At: Los Angeles - Shrine Auditorium.

La bohème (Puccini) – New York: Metropolitan Opera. Role: Musetta (Met Debut). Cast: Raina Kabaivanska (Mimí), Richard Tucker (Rodolfo), Cesare Siepi (Colline). Conductor: Fausto Cleva.

Il campiello (Wolf-Ferrari). Role: Gnese. Cast: Elena Rizzieri (Gasparina), Angelo Mercuriali (Dona Pasqua Polegana), Laura Zannini (Orsola), Giuseppe Savio (Zorzeto), Mario Borriello (Cavalier Astolfi). Conductor: Ettore Gracis. Recording, Milan, Studi Della RAI.

=== 1964 ===
Orfeo ed Euridice (Gluck) – Naples: Teatro di S. Carlo. Role: Amore. Cast: Giulietta Simionato (Orfeo), Nicoletta Panni (Euridice). Conductor: Peter Maag. Director: Margherita Wallmann.

Gianni Schicchi (Puccini) – Naples: Teatro di S. Carlo. Role: Lauretta. Cast: Renato Capecchi (Gianni Schicchi), Enzo Tei (Rinuccio). Conductor: Giuseppe Patanè Caravaglios. Director: Giovacchino Forzano.

The nose (Shostakovich) – Italian Premiere - Florence: Maggio Musicale Fiorentino – Teatro La Pergola. Role: La Figlia. Cast: Renato Capecchi (Platòn Kusnic Kavaliòf), Italo Tajo (Ivàn Jákovlevic), Cesy Broggini (Alexandra Podtochina). Conductor: Bruno Bartoletti. Director: Eduardo De Filippo. Designer: Mino Maccari.

Lucia di Lammermoor (Donizetti) - Klagenfurt: Stadt Theater. Role: Lucia. Cast: Walter Monachesi (Enrico), Bruno Piacentini (Edgardo). Conductor: Armando La Rosa Parodi. Director: Hilda Di Carli.

Un ballo in maschera (Verdi) – Rome – Teatro dell’Opera – Terme di Caracalla. Role: Oscar. Cast: Gianni Raimondi (Riccardo), Louis Quilico (Silvano), Lucia Danieli (Ulrica). Conductor: Carlo Felice Cillario. Director: Margherita Wallmann.

La bohème (Puccini) – Rome – Teatro dell’Opera. Role: Musetta. Cast: Mietta Sighele (Mimí), Juan Oncina (Rodolfo), Nicola Zaccaria (Colline). Conductor: Oliviero De Fabritiis. Director: Franco Enriquez.

Rigoletto (Verdi). Role: Gilda. Cast: Luigi Quilico (Rigoletto), Giuseppe Campora (Il Duca). Conductor: Ernesto Barbini. Recording in English for Canadian TV CBC, Toronto.

Jeanne d'Arc au bûcher (Honegger). Role: La Vergine. Cast: Dora Carral (Margherita). Conductor: Armando La Rosa Parodi. Recording, Rome, Auditorium Foro Italico.

=== 1965 ===
Don Pasquale (Donizetti) – Osaka, Festival. Role: Norina. Cast: Renato Capecchi (Malatesta), Ugo Trama (Don Pasquale), Umberto Grilli (Ernesto). Conductor: Ennio Gerelli. Director: Sandro Bolchi. Designer: Pier Luigi Pizzi. Reprised At: Manila - Festival.

Euridice (Peri) – Florence – Maggio Musicale Fiorentino – Boboli Gardens. Role: Euridice. Cast: Marco Stecchi (Orfeo), Laura Londi (La Ninfa), Flora Rafanelli (Dafne), Paolo Washington (Plutone), Alfredo Bianchini (Tirsi). Conductor: Bruno Rigacci. Director: Franco Zeffirelli.

Orfeo (Monteverdi) – Osaka, Festival. Role: Euridice, Eco. Cast: Dora Carral (Musica, Proserpina), Renato Capecchi (Apollo), Ugo Trama (Caronte, Plutone). Conductor: Ennio Gerelli. Director: Sandro Sequi.

La bohème (Puccini) – San Francisco Opera House. Role: Musetta. Cast: Renata Tebaldi (Mimí). Conductor: Piero Bellugi. Director: Lofti Mansouri.

Don Giovanni (Mozart) – San Francisco Opera House. Role: Zerlina. Cast: Thomas Stewart (Don Giovanni), Leontyne Price (Donna Anna), Ugo Trama (Leporello). Conductor: Francesco Molinari Pradelli. Director: Paul Hager. Reprised At: Los Angeles - Music Center.

Un ballo in maschera (Verdi) – San Francisco Opera House. Role: Oscar. Cast: Sándor Kónya (Riccardo), Leontyne Price (Amelia). Conductor: Francesco Molinari Pradelli. Director: Henry Butler.

Il barbiere di Siviglia (Rossini) – San Francisco Opera House. Role: Rosina. Cast: Heinz Blankenburg (Figaro), Ugo Trama (Basilio). Conductor: Piero Bellugi. Director: Günther Rennert. Reprised At: Los Angeles - Music Center.

Ariadne auf Naxos (Strauss) – San Francisco Opera House. Role: Najade. Cast: Hildegard Hillebrecht (Ariadne), Reri Grist (Zerbinetta), Jess Thomas (Bacchus). Conductor: Horst Stein. Director: Paul Hager. Reprised at: Los Angeles - Music Center.

Rigoletto (Verdi) – Cincinnati – Summer Opera Festival at the Zoo. Role: Gilda. Cast: Benjamin Rayson (Rigoletto), Daniele Barioni (Il Duca). Conductor: Ignace Strasfogel. Director: Glynn Ross.

Il matrimonio segreto (Cimarosa) – Palermo: Teatro Massimo. Role: Carolina. Cast: Adriana Martino (Elisetta), Giuseppe Baratti (Paolino), Renato Capecchi (Robinson), Paolo Washington (Geronimo). Conductor: Franco Capuana. Director: Mario Missiroli.

Un ballo in maschera (Verdi) – Palermo: Teatro Massimo. Role: Oscar. Cast: Cornell MacNeil (Riccardo), Luisa Maragliano (Amelia), Adriana Lazzarini (Ulrica). Conductor: Antonino Votto. Director: Aldo Mirabella Vassallo.

=== 1966 ===
Betulia liberata (Mozart). Role: Amital. Cast: Dora Carral (Cabri), Pietro Bottazzo (Ozia), Ugo Trama (Achior). Conductor: Lovro von Matačić. Recording, RAI, Auditorium Napoli.

Il barbiere di Siviglia (Rossini) – Lecce: Teatro Politeama. Role: Rosina. Cast: Marco Stecchi (Figaro), Luigi Pontiggia (Almaviva). Conductor: Ottavio Ziino. Director: Carlo Acly Azzolini.

Lucia di Lammermoor (Donizetti) – Belfast: The Grand Opera House. Role: Lucia. Cast: Giuseppe Forgioni (Enrico), Plinio Clabassi (Raimondo), Angelo Marchiandi (Edgardo). Conductor: Tonino Pardo. Director: Dario Michele.

Rigoletto (Verdi) – Belluno: Teatro Comunale. Role: Gilda. Cast: Giuseppe Forgione (Rigoletto), Manlio Rocchi (Il Duca), Giovanni Amodeo (Sparafucile). Conductor: Vittorio Machí. Reprised At: Cividale Del Friuli - Teatro Adelaide Ristori.

Rigoletto (Verdi) – Mazara Del Vallo: Teatro Vaccara. Role: Gilda. Cast: Giuseppe Forgione (Rigoletto), Enzo Reina (Il Duca). Conductor: Ottavio Marino. Director: Tonino Pipi. Reprised At: Alcamo. Cast: Ottavio Taddei (Il Duca).

Rigoletto (Verdi) – Fiuggi: Teatro Delle Fonti. Role: Gilda. Cast: Franco Mieli (Rigoletto), Antonio Pirino (Il Duca). Conductor: Giuseppe Ruisi. Director: Sanzio Levratti.

Adina (Rossini). Role: Adina. Cast: Giuseppe Baratti (Selimo), James Loomis (Califfo), Montanaro (Mustafá), Adriano Ferrario (Ali). Conductor: Bruno Rigacci. Recording at Lugano, Radio Monte Ceneri.

La Fantarca (Roman Vlad). Role: Contessa Safò Dei Papaglioni. Cast: Laura Zannini (Signorina Esterina), Lino Puglisi (Don Ciccio), Alvinio Misciano (Lopresti), Ugo Trama (Caroniti), Teodoro Rovetta (Capo Macchinista). Conductor: Nino Sanzogno. Director: Vittorio Cottafavi. Television Recording, Milan, Turin, Studi RAI.

=== 1967 ===
Lucia di Lammermoor (Donizetti) – Dublin: Gaiety Theatre (May 31, Jun 2, 7, 13, 1967 at the Gaiety Theatre Dublin as part of the Dublin Grand Opera Society's Spring Season). Role: Lucia. Cast: Franco Pagliazzi (Enrico), Ettore Babini (Edgardo). Conductor: Adolfo Camozzo. Director: Maria Sofia Marasca.

Lucia di Lammermoor (Donizetti) – Cork: Opera House (June 21 – 24, 1967 at the Opera House Cork as part of the Dublin Grand Opera Society's Spring Season). Role: Lucia. Cast: Franco Pagliazzi (Enrico), Jon Piso (Edgardo). Conductor: Napoleone Annovazzi. Director: Maria Sofia Marasca.

The nose (Shostakovich) – Rome: Teatro Dell’opera. Role: La Figlia. Cast: Renato Cesari (Platòn Kusmic Kavaliof), Italo Tajo (Ivàn Jàkovlevic), Cesy Broggini (Alexandra Padtòcina). Conductor: Bruno Bartoletti. Director: Eduardo De Filippo. Designer: Mino Maccari.

Festa monteverdiana – Firenze – Maggio Musicale Fiorentino – Palazzo Vecchio – Salone Dei Cinquecento. With: Laura Londi, Flora Rafanelli, Alvinio Misciano. Conductor: Roberto Lupi. Director: Mario Ferrero. Designer: Pier Luigi Pizzi.

Lucia di Lammermoor (Donizetti) – Modena: Teatro Comunale. Role: Lucia. Cast: Piero Francia (Enrico), Ottavio Garaventa (Edgardo), Ruggero Raimondi (Raimondo). Conductor: Danilo Belardinelli. Director: Fantasio Piccoli.

Pia de’ Tolomei (Donizetti) – Siena: Teatro Dei Rinnovati. Role: Pia De’ Tolomei. Cast: Aldo Bottion (Ghino Degli Armieri), Walter Alberti (Nello Della Pietra), Florindo Andreolli (Rodrigo De’ Tolomei), Franco Ventriglia (Piero, Lamberto). Conductor: Bruno Rigacci. Director: Enrico Colosimo, Aldo Masella. Reprised At: Bologna - Teatro Comunale, 1968.

L'amore medico (Wolf-Ferrari). Role: Lucinda. Cast: Giuseppe Valdengo (Arnolfo), Agostino Lazzari (Clitandro), Florindo Andreolli (Bahis). Conductor: Arturo Basile. Recording, Milan, Studi RAI.

Parisina d’Este (Donizetti). Role: Parisina. Conductor: Bruno Rigacci. Recording, Lugano, Radio Monte Ceneri.

=== 1968 ===
The Bassarids (Henze) – Milan: Teatro alla Scala (Italian Premiere). Role: Autonoe. Cast: Fedora Barbieri (Beroe), Kostas Paskalis (Penteo), Paolo Washington (Cadmo), Mirto Picchi (Tiresia), Kerstin Mayer (Agave). Conductor: Nino Sanzogno. Director: Konrad Swinarski. Designer: Renzo Vespignani.

Un ballo in maschera (Verdi) – Milan: Teatro alla Scala. Role: Oscar. Cast: Carlo Bergonzi (Riccardo), Peter Glossop (Renato), Adriana Lazzarini (Ulrica), Leontyne Price (Amelia), Nicola Zaccaria (Samueli). Conductor: Antonino Votto. Director: Margherita Wallmann.

Il campanello (Donizetti) – Trieste: Teatro Verdi. Role: Serafina. Cast: Alfredo Mariotti (Don Annibale Pistacchio). Conductor: Ferruccio Scaglia. Director: Fantasio Piccoli.

Pia de’ Tolomei (Donizetti). Role: Pia De’ Tolomei. Cast: Franco Pagliazzi (Nello Della Pietra), Giuseppe Baratti (Ghino Degli Armieri), Rodolfo Malacarne (Rodrigo De’ Tolomei). Conductor: Bruno Rigacci. Recording, Lugano, Radio Monte Ceneri.

Rigoletto (Verdi) – Rovigo: Teatro Sociale. Role: Gilda. Cast: Piero Cappuccilli (Rigoletto), Giovan Battista Daviú (Il Duca), Laura Zannini (Maddalena). Conductor: Nino Bonavolontá. Director: Giulio Paternieri.

Un ballo in maschera (Verdi) – Vienna: Staatsoper. Role: Oscar. Cast: Carlo Cossutta (Riccardo), Marcella Pobbe (Amelia). Conductor: Miltiades Caridis. Director: Josef Gielen.

Cosí fan tutte (Mozart) – Florence: Teatro Comunale. Role: Fiordiligi. Cast: Biancamaria Casoni (Dorabella), Mariella Adani (Despina), Giuseppe Baratti (Ferrando), Renato Capecchi (Guglielmo), Nicola Rossi Lemeni (Don Alfonso). Conductor: Thomas Schippers. Director: Filippo Crivelli.

=== 1969 ===
Un ballo in maschera (Verdi) – Milan: Teatro alla Scala. Role: Oscar. Cast: Luigi Ottolini (Riccardo), Rita Orlandi Malaspina (Amelia), Fedora Barbieri (Ulrica), Peter Glossop (Renato), Nicola Zaccaria (Samuel). Conductor: Antonino Votto. Director: Margherita Wallmann.

Burlesca (Antonio Veretti) – Naples: Teatro di S. Carlo. Role: Samar. Cast: Agostino Lazzari (Aladino), Cesy Broggini (Regina), Antonio Boyer (Re). Conductor: Hans Georg Ratien. Director: Enrico Colosimo.

The gambler (Prokofiev) – Rome: Teatro dell’Opera. Role: Pauline. Cast: Juan Oncina (Alessio), Mirella Parutto (La Nonna), Nicola Rossi-Lemeni (Il Generale), Scipio Colombo (Mr Astley). Conductor: Bruno Bartoletti. Director: Giovanni Poli.

Il campiello (Wolf-Ferrari) – Venice: Gran Teatro La Fenice. Role: Gasparina. Cast: Milena Dal Piva (Lucietta), Rosetta Pizzo (Gnese), Mario Basiola (Cavalier Astolfi), Florindo Andreolli (Dona Cate Panciana), Renato Ercolani (Dona Pasqua Polegana). Conductor: Bruno Bogo. Director: Cesco Baseggio.

Il signor Bruschino (Rossini) – Edinburgh: King's Theatre – Tour of the Maggio Musicale Fiorentino. Role: Sofia. Cast: Giuseppe Baratti (Florville), Renato Capecchi (Bruschino), Claudio Desderi (Gaudenzio). Conductor: Aldo Ceccato. Director: Filippo Crivelli.

=== 1970 ===
Falstaff (Salieri) - Role: Alice. Conductor: Bruno Rigacci. Recording, Lugano, Radio Monte Ceneri.

L'etoile (Chabrier) - Palermo: Teatro Massimo. Role: Aloes. Cast: Renato Capecchi (Siroco), Glauco Scarlini (Tapioca), Conductor: Piero Bellugi. Director: Luigi Rognoni, François Ganeau.

Il cordovano (Petrassi) - Rome: Teatro dell'Opera. Role: Donna Lorenza. Cast: Emilia Ravaglia (Cristina), Angelo Marchiandi (Un musico), Giorgio Taddeo (Cannizares). Conductor: Gaeano Delogu. Director: Mario Missiroli.

=== 1971 ===
Un ballo in maschera (Verdi) - Bari: Teatro Petruzzelli. Role: Oscar. Cast: Bruno Prevedi (Riccardo), Piero Cappuccilli (Renato), Rita Orlandi Malaspina (Amelia), Adriana Lazzarini (Ulrica). Conductor: Armando La Rosa Parodi. Director: Enrico Frigerio.

Un ballo in maschera (Verdi) - Lecce: Teatro Politeama. Role: Oscar. Cast: Luigi Ottolini (Riccardo), Aldo Protti (Renato), Rita Orlandi Malaspina (Amelia), Adriana Lazzarini (Ulrica). Conductor: Napoleone Annovazzi. Director: Spataro

Il ladro e la zitella (Menotti) - Role: Laetitia. Cast: Elena Zilio (Miss Todd), Alberto Rinaldi (Bob), Conductor: Nino Bonavolontà. Recording: Naples, Studi RAI.

I due baroni di Rocca Azzurra (Cimarosa). Role: Madama Laura. Recording: Lugano, Radio Monte Ceneri

=== 1973 ===
L'uomo che ride (Pedrollo) - Role: Cieca

=== 1975 ===
Il barbiere di Siviglia (Rossini) - S. Margherita Ligure: Parco di Villa Durazzo. Role: Rosina. Cast: Mario d'Anna (Figaro), Paolo Barbacini (Almaviva), Giorgio Taddeo (Bartolo). Conductor: Carlo Moresco. Director: Ricky Moresco. Reprised at: Camogli: Teatro Sociale, Rapallo: Auditorium delle Clarisse

=== 1976 ===
Il duello comico (Paisiello) - Role: Bettina. Recording: Lugano, Radio Monte Ceneri

RUOLO	OPERA	COMPOSITORE
Amina Lisa	La sonnambula	Bellini
Angelo	Il Re del dolore	Caldara
Gessica	Il mercante di Venezia	Castelnuovo Tedesco
Aloes	L'etoile	Chabrier
Madama Laura	I due baroni di Rocca Azzurra	Cimarosa
Carolina	Il matrimonio segreto	Cimarosa
Gilda	L'ajo nell'imbarazzo	Donizetti
Serafina	Il campanello	Donizetti
Norina	Don Pasquale	Donizetti
Adina	L'elisir d'amore	Donizetti
Maria	La figlia del reggimento	Donizetti
Lucia	Lucia di Lammermoor	Donizetti
Parisina	Parisina d'Este	Donizetti
Pia	Pia de' Tolomei	Donizetti
Rita	Rita	Donizetti
Amore	Orfeo ed Euridice	Gluck
Marguerite	Faust	Gounod
Dorinda	Orlando	Händel
Autonoe	Die Bassariden	Henze
La Vergine	Jeanne d'Arc au Bûcher	Honegger
Laetitia	Il ladro e la zitella	Menotti
Euridice	Orfeo	Monteverdi
Amital	Betulia liberata	Mozart
Fiordiligi	Così fan tutte	Mozart
Blonde	Die Entführung aus dem Serail	Mozart
Zerlina	Don Giovanni	Mozart
Tharsis	Thamos, König in Ägypten	Mozart
Bettina	Il duello comico	Paisiello
Eugenia	La molinara	Paisiello
Scintilla	La contadina astuta	Pergolesi
Nena	Lo frate 'nnamorato	Pergolesi
Euridice	Euridice	Peri
Donna Lorenza	Il cordovano	Petrassi
Pauline	Il giocatore	Prokofiev
Mimì Musetta	La bohème	Puccini
Lauretta	Gianni Schicchi	Puccini
Liù	Turandot	Puccini
Adina	Adina	Rossini
Rosina	Il barbiere di Siviglia	Rossini
Berenice	L'occasione fa il ladro	Rossini
Sofia	Il signor Bruschino	Rossini
Alice	Falstaff	Salieri
La figlia di Alexandra Padtòcina	Il naso	Shostakovich
Najade	Ariadne auf Naxos	Strauss
Eine Italienische Sängerin	Capriccio	Strauss
Rossignol	Le rossignol	Stravinsky
Oscar	Un ballo in maschera	Verdi
Nannetta	Falstaff	Verdi
Gilda	Rigoletto	Verdi
Samar	Burlesca	Veretti
Contessa Safò dei Papaglioni	La fantarca	Vlad
Lucinda	L'amore medico	Wolf-Ferrari
Gasparina Gnese	Il campiello	Wolf-Ferrari
