= Flagello =

Flagello is a surname. Notable people with the surname include:

- Ezio Flagello (1931–2009), American operatic bass
- Nicolas Flagello (1928–1994), American composer and conductor
