= La rondine =

Opera in three acts by Giacomo Puccini

- Opera by Giacomo Puccini
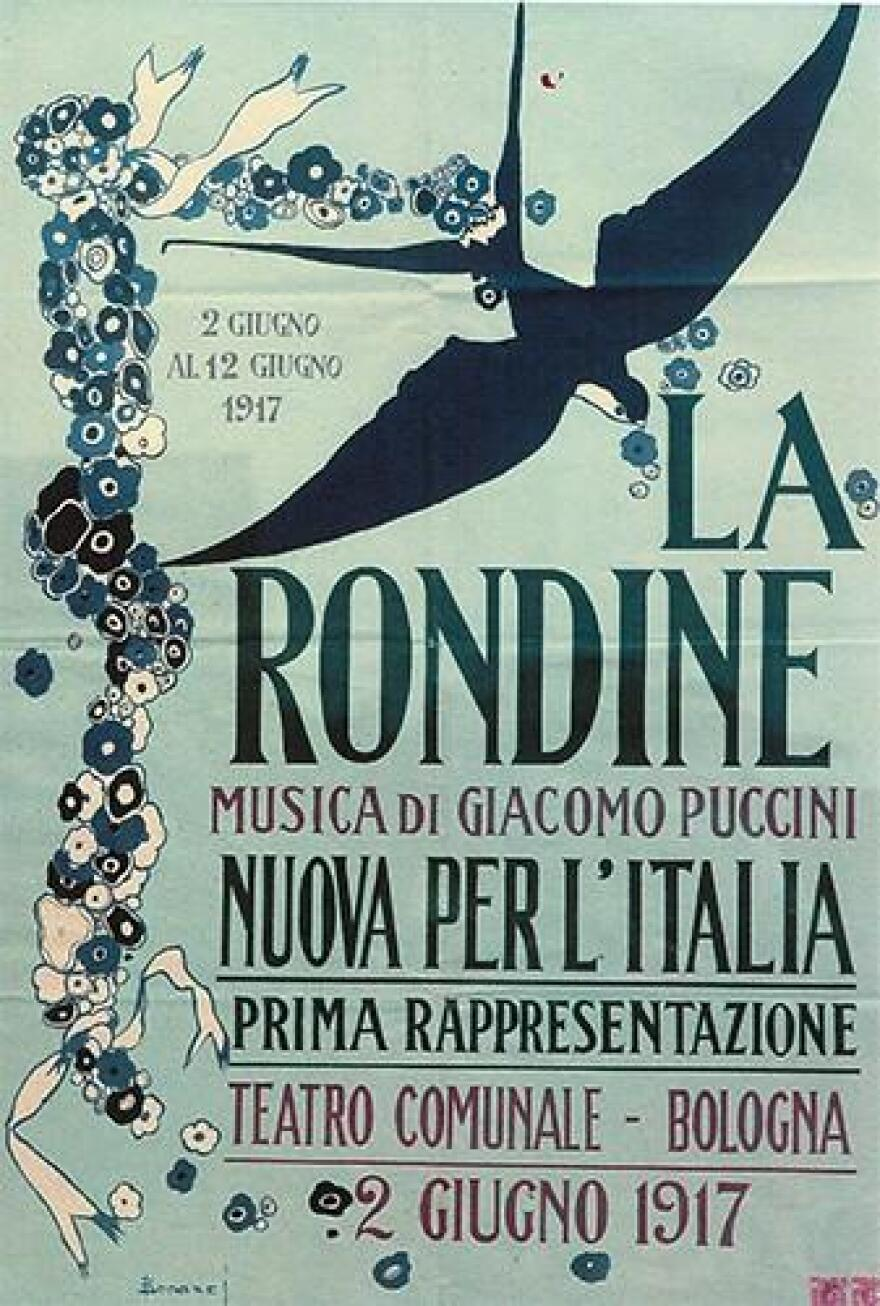
- Poster of a 1917 production in Bologna
- Librettist: Giuseppe Adami
- Language: Italian
- Premiere: 27 March 1917; Grand Théâtre de Monte Carlo

La rondine (The Swallow) is an opera in three acts by Giacomo Puccini to an Italian libretto by Giuseppe Adami, based on a libretto by Alfred Maria Willner and Heinz Reichert. It was first performed at the Grand Théâtre de Monte Carlo (or the Théâtre du Casino) in Monte Carlo on 27 March 1917.

== Composition history ==
In autumn 1913, the directors of Vienna's Carltheater commissioned Puccini to compose a Viennese operetta. After confirming that it could take the form of a comic opera with no spoken dialogue in the style of Der Rosenkavalier, "only more entertaining and more organic," he agreed. The work proceeded for two years, sometimes intensely, sometimes with great difficulty, and in spring 1916 the opera was finished. The originally intended Viennese première was impeded by the outbreak of World War I and the entrance of Italy in the Alliance against Austria-Hungary, hence the Opéra de Monte-Carlo was chosen as the location to present it, with Gilda dalla Rizza and Tito Schipa in the leading roles. A feature of the music is Puccini's use of modern dance rhythms, such as the tango, to denote the various characters.

In Italy, Puccini offered the work to his editor Tito Ricordi, who declined to buy it, dismissing it as "Bad Lehár"; thus Ricordi's rival, Lorenzo Sonzogno, obtained the right to give the first performance outside Austria-Hungary and moved the premiere to Monégasque neutral territory. At the premiere in Monte Carlo in 1917 the initial reception by the public and press was warm. However, despite the artistic value of the score, La rondine has been one of Puccini's less successful works; "In box office terms, [it] was the poor cousin to the other great hits." There is no established final version of it, Puccini being dissatisfied, as often, with the result of his work; he revised it many times to the point of making three versions (1917, 1920, 1921), with two completely different endings, but died before clearly deciding on a final version.

== Roles ==
Role	Voice type	Premiere cast, 27 March 1917 (Conductor: Gino Marinuzzi)
Magda de Civry	soprano	Gilda dalla Rizza
Lisette, her maid	soprano	Ines Maria Ferraris
Ruggero Lastouc	tenor	Tito Schipa
Prunier, a poet	tenor	Francesco Dominici
Rambaldo Fernandez, Magda's protector	baritone	Gustave Huberdeau
Périchaud	baritone / bass	Libert
Gobin	tenor	Charles Delmas
Crébillon	bass/baritone	Stéphane
Rabonnier	baritone	
Yvette	soprano	Suzy Laugée
Bianca	soprano	Andrée Moreau
Suzy	mezzo-soprano	Charlotte Mattei
A butler	bass	Delestan
A voice	soprano	
Members of the bourgeoisie, students, painters, elegantly dressed ladies and gentlemen, grisettes, flower girls and dancing girls, waiters.

== Synopsis ==
Place: Paris and the French Riviera.
Time: Mid-19th century.

=== Act 1 ===
Magda's salon, Paris

At a cocktail party hosted by the courtesan Magda, the poet Prunier expounds his theories on love. Magda's friends Yvette, Bianca and Suzy playfully mock him, while Lisette, Magda's maid, tells him he does not know what he is talking about. Prunier takes offence and Magda orders Lisette to leave. Prunier maintains that no one is immune to romantic love and sings the first verse of his latest song about Doretta, who rejected a king as her suitor because of the value she placed on true love. He does not know how to finish the song, so Magda takes over and provides the second verse: she recounts how Doretta falls in love with a student (Aria: Chi il bel sogno di Doretta). Magda's guests are charmed by her performance and her long-term protector Rambaldo gives her a pearl necklace. Lisette enters to announce the arrival of a young man – the son of an old school friend of Rambaldo. Lisette is ordered by Rambaldo to bring in the guest. Suddenly nostalgic, Magda recalls her life as a young girl and happy evenings spent dancing at Bullier's, where she first experienced love (Aria: Ore dolci e divine). Some of the guests suggest that Prunier should compose a song based on Magda's story but he declares a preference for songs about perverse heroines, such as Berenice or Salome. Prunier demonstrates his skills at palmistry to some of the girls, while Lisette brings in the visitor, Ruggero. He has an introduction from his father for Rambaldo. Prunier reads Magda's palm and tells her that she is like a swallow: she longs for migration towards the sun and true love. Ruggero explains that it is his first visit to Paris and asks where he may find the best place to spend an evening: after much discussion, Lisette recommends Bullier's. Ruggero leaves. Magda chides the other guests for mocking him. After they too have gone, she tells Lisette that she will remain at home that evening. Then, on a whim, she determines to disguise herself and go to Bullier's as well. She goes to get changed. Prunier returns in secret to escort Lisette to Bullier's and flirts extravagantly with her. Lisette is wearing Magda's hat and Prunier tells her that he dislikes it and orders her to take it off. They then set out together. Magda re-enters, disguised as a shop girl. She sings a fragment of Prunier's song about Doretta as she leaves, happily anticipating an adventure.

=== Act 2 ===
Bullier's, Paris

The bar is packed with students, artists and flower girls, singing and dancing. Magda enters and attracts the attention of several young men. She hurries over to a table at which Ruggero is sitting alone. She apologizes for intruding and tells him that she will move away as soon as the young men at the bar stop watching her. Ruggero, who does not recognize Magda in her disguise, asks her to stay. They chat and Ruggero tells Magda that she reminds him of the quiet and elegant girls from his home town, Montauban. They dance happily together. Prunier and Lisette enter, arguing about Prunier's desire to turn Lisette into a lady and to educate her. Magda and Ruggero return to their table and Magda begins to reminisce about a past love affair. Ruggero asks for her name and she answers 'Pauletta'. She writes the name on the tablecloth and Ruggero adds his own beneath. The attraction between Magda and Ruggero grows as they talk. Lisette and Prunier pass their table and Lisette recognizes Magda. Magda signals to Prunier not to give away her secret and Prunier tells Lisette she is mistaken. To prove his point, he introduces Lisette to Magda, who tries to maintain her disguise, to the puzzlement of Lisette. The two couples sit together and drink a toast to love (Aria: Bevo al tuo fresco sorriso). Prunier notices that Rambaldo has come in, and orders Lisette to take Ruggero out of the room for a few minutes, which she does. Rambaldo demands an explanation from Magda for her behaviour and disguise; she tells him that she has nothing to add to what he has already seen. Rambaldo suggests they leave together but she refuses and declares her love for Ruggero, apologizing for any pain she is causing Rambaldo by her actions. Rambaldo tells her that he cannot prevent her staying with Ruggero. As he leaves, Ruggero returns, and tells Magda that dawn is breaking. They decide to begin a new life together, but Magda secretly worries that she is deceiving Ruggero.

=== Act 3 ===
The French Riviera

Magda and Ruggero have been living together on the French Riviera for some months. They talk about their first meeting and happiness together, living quietly by the sea. Ruggero tells Magda that he has written to his mother to ask for money to pay their growing debts and for her consent to his marriage to Magda. Ruggero imagines their happy married life and the child they may have (Aria: Dimmi che vuoi seguirmi). Magda is deeply touched, but also uneasy: she knows that her past life as a courtesan would make her unacceptable to Ruggero's family, and possibly to Ruggero if he knew who she really was. As Ruggero leaves to post his letter she meditates on her dilemma, torn between her desire to tell Ruggero everything, her wish not to hurt him and her fear of losing his love. Prunier and Lisette arrive. Lisette has had a brief and disastrous career as a music-hall singer: her performance in Nice the previous evening was a catastrophe. She and Prunier bicker with each other while waiting for Magda. When Magda appears, Lisette begs for her job back, and Magda consents. Prunier expresses surprise that Magda can be happy away from Paris, and delivers a message to Magda from Rambaldo: he is happy to take her back on any terms. Magda refuses to listen. Prunier takes his leave of Lisette (first arranging a rendezvous with her for that evening) and Lisette resumes her duties as Magda's maid. Ruggero returns with a letter from his mother, in which she says that if Ruggero's fiancée has all the virtues he has described to her, he will have a blissful marriage. She looks forward to welcoming the couple to her home and sends Magda a kiss. Magda is unable to keep her secret any longer. She tells Ruggero about her past and declares that she can never be his wife – she would cause his parents too much grief. Ruggero implores Magda not to abandon him (Ma come puoi lasciarmi), but Magda is adamant that they cannot remain together, and that Ruggero must return home. Like a swallow, she flies back to Rambaldo and her old life, leaving Ruggero behind, devastated.

== Subsequent performance history ==
=== Revised versions ===
In the second version, which was premiered at Teatro Massimo, Palermo, in 1920, Prunier is the deciding force in Magda's decision to leave Ruggero in Act 3, and she departs without seeing her lover. In the third version of the opera, Puccini changed the final act again, adding a scene in which Rambaldo comes to beg Magda to return to him, and ending with Ruggero's discovery (via an anonymous telegram, most likely from his father, Rombaldo's old friend.) of who Magda really is, his angry rebuke of her, and his decision to leave her for ever. At the end of this version, Magda is left alone with Lisette. The third version was not heard until 1994 in Turin. Moreover, a fire at Casa Sonzogno archives caused by Allied bombing during the war destroyed parts of the score which had to be restored based on the surviving vocal-piano arrangements. The orchestration of the third version was finally completed in authentic Puccinian style by the Italian composer Lorenzo Ferrero at the request of Teatro Regio di Torino and subsequently performed there on 22 March 1994.

La Rondine was first performed in Buenos Aires, Argentina at the Teatro Colón on 24 May 1917, two months after the world premiere in Monte Carlo. Gilda Dalla Rizza, who had performed the role in the world premiere, was Magda, and Charles Hackett was Ruggero.

The American premiere of La rondine took place at the Metropolitan Opera in New York City on March 10, 1928; Lucrezia Bori sang the role of Magda and Beniamino Gigli appeared as Ruggero. As part of a 1958 celebration marking the centenary of Puccini's birth, the Teatro di San Carlo at Naples, Italy, staged a revival of La rondine, at that time one of Puccini's least performed operas. The revival was well received, with audiences and critics deeming it a success.

=== Modern-day performances ===
In Europe since the 1990s stagings have included the première of the third version at Teatro Regio di Torino (1994), as well as performances at La Scala (1994), Leeds Opera North (1994, 2001), Oper Bonn and Ludwigshaven State Opera House (1995), Teatro del Giglio in Lucca (1998), Teatro Filarmonico di Verona (2002), Kansallisooppera, Helsinki (2002, 2003, 2007), Royal Opera House, Covent Garden, London (2002, 2005, 2013), Théâtre du Châtelet, Paris (2005), Opéra de Monte-Carlo (2007), La Fenice in Venice (2008), 2012 Teatro Nacional de Sao Carlos (2012), and Portuguese Symphony Orchestra.

In the US, major productions were seen at Pittsburgh Opera (1982), the New York City Opera (1984), Washington National Opera (1998), Los Angeles Opera (2000, 2008), Atlanta Opera (2002), Boston Lyric Opera (2003), Dallas Opera (2007), San Francisco Opera (2007), Sarasota Opera (2008), the Metropolitan Opera (2008, 2014, 2024), and Opera San José (2017).

Marta Domingo's production of La rondine in Bonn in 1995 used the third version, but added to the tragedy by having Magda commit suicide by drowning in the final bars of the opera. This version of the opera has since been staged by the Washington National Opera and the Los Angeles Opera.

Following the premiere of a joint new production by director Nicolas Joël at the Royal Opera House in 2002 (starring soprano Angela Gheorghiu as Magda) and at the Théâtre du Capitole de Toulouse, La rondine was seen at the Théâtre du Châtelet, revived at the Royal Opera House in 2005 and 2013, and presented by the San Francisco Opera in 2007, all with Gheorghiu. On 31 December 2008, again with Gheorghiu as Magda, the Metropolitan Opera in New York gave the company's first staging in 70 years. The matinée performance on 10 January 2009 was broadcast in HD to movie theaters and schools throughout the world. This opera also was performed by Des Moines Metro Opera (Indianola, IA) in July 2012, starring Joyce El-Khoury.

== Recordings ==
The creator of the role of Lisette, Ines Maria Ferraris, made the earliest known recording of the aria "Chi il bel sogno di Doretta" in 1928 for the Odeon label.

Year	Cast (Ruggero, Magda, Rambaldo, Lisette, Prunier)	Conductor, Opera House and Orchestra	Label
1966	Daniele Barioni, Anna Moffo, Mario Sereni, Graziella Sciutti, Piero de Palma	Francesco Molinari-Pradelli, RCA Italiana Opera orchestra and chorus	CD:RCA Victor; Cat: GD60459(2)
1981	Plácido Domingo, Kiri Te Kanawa, Leo Nucci, Mariana Nicolesco; David Rendall	Lorin Maazel, London Symphony Orchestra; Ambrosian Chorus	CD:CBS; Cat: M2K-37852
1997	Roberto Alagna, Angela Gheorghiu, Alberto Rinaldi, Inva Mula-Tchako, William Matteuzzi	Antonio Pappano, London Symphony Orchestra; London Voices	CD:EMI Classics; Cat: 56338
1998	Marcus Haddock, Ainhoa Arteta, William Parcher, Inva Mula-Tchako, Richard Troxell	Emmanuel Villaume, Kennedy Center Opera House Orchestra and Washington Opera Chorus (Recording of a performance in the Kennedy Center, Washington. February/March)	DVD: Decca; Cat: 074 3335
2007	Fabio Sartori, Svetla Vassileva, Marzio Giossi, Maya Dashuk, Emanuele Giannino	Alberto Veronesi, Orchestra and Chorus of the Puccini Festival (Recording of performances at the Festival Puccini in Torre del Lago, August 2007)	DVD:Naxos; Cat: 2.110266
2008	Fernando Portari, Fiorenza Cedolins, Stefano Antonucci, Sandra Pastrana, Emanuele Giannino	Carlo Rizzi, La Fenice Opera House Orchestra and Chorus (Recording of performances at La Fenice, January)	DVD: ArtHaus Musik; Cat: 101 329
2009	Roberto Alagna, Angela Gheorghiu, Samuel Ramey, Lisette Oropesa, Marius Brenciu	Marco Armiliato, Chorus and Orchestra of the Metropolitan Opera, New York (Recording of a performance at the Metropolitan Opera on 10 January 2009)	DVD:EMI Classics; Cat: 50999 631618-9 2
