= Mario Sereni =

Italian opera singer (1928–2015)

- Mario Sereni (photo with 1960 dedication)
- Occupation: opera singer
- Years active: 1953-1986

Mario Sereni (25 March 1928 – 24 July 2015) was an Italian baritone, who sang leading roles at the New York Metropolitan Opera for many years.

Sereni was born in Perugia, Italy. He attended the Accademia di Santa Cecilia in Rome and the Accademia Chigiana in Siena where he was a pupil of Mario Basiola. His professional career began in 1953, at the Maggio Musicale Fiorentino and within four years he made his debut at the Metropolitan Opera on 9 November 1957 as Gérard in Andrea Chénier.

Sereni enjoyed a long and steady career at the Metropolitan Opera. In twenty-seven seasons, he sang most of the important baritone roles of the Italian repertory in operas such as Ernani, Luisa Miller, Il trovatore, La traviata, Un ballo in maschera, La forza del destino, Don Carlo, and Aida. He also sang in La Gioconda, Cavalleria rusticana, Manon Lescaut, La bohème, and Madama Butterfly, as well as L'elisir d'amore and Lucia di Lammermoor.

Sereni was also a regular guest at the opera houses of Chicago, San Francisco and Dallas. He also enjoyed a successful international career appearing frequently at the Vienna State Opera, La Scala in Milan and the Teatro Colón in Buenos Aires.

Sereni remained in the shadow of several other baritones of his time, principally Leonard Warren, Robert Merrill, Ettore Bastianini, Rolando Panerai and Piero Cappuccilli, yet his many recordings show considerable distinction with his voice, technique, and style compared to others.

Sereni sang Germont in two famous performances of La traviata. The first, with Maria Callas and Alfredo Kraus in 1958, became known as the "Lisbon Traviata". The second, from La Scala in 1964, with Anna Moffo and Renato Cioni, became known as the "Karajan Traviata".

Mario Sereni retired in 1986. He died in Perugia in 2015.

== Studio recordings ==
- Donizetti – L'elisir d'amore – Mirella Freni, Nicolai Gedda, Renato Capecchi – Rome Opera Chorus and Orchestra, Francesco Molinari-Pradelli – EMI (1966)
- Donizetti – Lucia di Lammermoor – Anna Moffo, Carlo Bergonzi, Ezio Flagello – RCA Italiana Opera Chorus and Orchestra, Georges Prêtre – RCA (1965)
- Verdi – Ernani – Leontyne Price, Carlo Bergonzi, Ezio Flagello – RCA Italiana Opera Chorus and Orchestra, Thomas Schippers – RCA (1967)
- Verdi – La traviata – Victoria de los Ángeles, Carlo del Monte – Rome Opera Chorus and Orchestra, Tullio Serafin – EMI (1959)
- Verdi – Aida – Birgit Nilsson, Franco Corelli, Grace Bumbry – Rome Opera Chorus and Orchestra, Zubin Mehta – EMI (1967)
- Giordano – Andrea Chénier – Franco Corelli, Antonietta Stella – Rome Opera Chorus and Orchestra, Gabriele Santini – EMI (1963)
- Puccini – La bohème – Mirella Freni, Nicolai Gedda, Mariella Adani – Rome Opera Chorus and Orchestra, Thomas Schippers – EMI – (1963)
- Puccini – Madama Butterfly – Victoria de los Ángeles, Jussi Björling, Miriam Pirazzini – Rome Opera Chorus and Orchestra, Gabriele Santini – EMI (1959)
- Puccini – La Rondine – Anna Moffo, Daniele Barioni, Graziella Sciutti, Piero de Palma – RCA Italiana Opera Chorus and Orchestra, Francesco Molinari-Pradelli – RCA (1966)
- Puccini – Turandot – Birgit Nilsson, Renata Tebaldi, Jussi Björling, Giorgio Tozzi – Rome Opera Orchestra, Erich Leinsdorf – RCA (1959)

== Sources ==
- Black Dog Opera Library, La Bohème, EMI Classics. ISBN 1-884822-83-5
- The Metropolitan Opera Guide to recorded Opera, edited by Paul Gruber, ISBN 0-393-03444-5
- The Metropolitan Opera Encyclopedia, edited by David Hamilton, (Simon & Schuster, New York, 1987). ISBN 0-671-61732-X
