= Piero de Palma =

Italian opera singer

- Born: 31 August 1925
- Origin: Italy
- Died: 5 April 2013 (aged 87)
- Genres: Opera
- Occupation: Tenor

Piero de Palma (31 August 1925 – 5 April 2013) was an Italian operatic tenor, particularly associated with comprimario roles.

After choral and concert work, he began his operatic repertoire career in 1948 by singing on Italian radio (RAI). He made his stage debut in 1952 at the Teatro di San Carlo in Naples, where he performed regularly until 1980. The same year saw his debuts at the Rome Opera and the Maggio Musicale Fiorentino; he then went on singing throughout Italy, appearing in Genoa, Palermo, Catania, Trieste, and Bergamo. He also appeared at the Baths of Caracalla and the Verona Arena, and made his debut at La Scala in Milan in 1958. He performed for numerous seasons regularly at The Dallas Opera. He made his Metropolitan Opera debut as Dr. Cajus in Falstaff in 1992.

He made a specialty of character roles and became perhaps the finest and most famous of all postwar comprimario artists. He possessed a fine voice and was an outstanding actor and sang an estimated 200 roles throughout his career, amongst his most famous were Dr. Cajus in Falstaff and Pong in Turandot. Other notable roles included Basilio, Normanno, Malcolm, Borsa, Gastone, Cassio, Spoletta, Edmondo, Goro, and Spalanzani. He sings on over 130 opera recordings from the 1950s to the 1980s, including multiple recordings of operas in different roles, e.g., Pong, Pang, and the Emperor, in various recordings of Turandot.

He died on 5 April 2013.

== Selected recordings ==
- Puccini - La Rondine - Anna Moffo (Magda), Daniele Barioni (Ruggero), Graziella Sciutti (Lisette), Piero de Palma (Prunier), Mario Sereni (Rambaldo) - RCA Italiana Opera Chorus and Orchestra, Francesco Molinari-Pradelli - RCA Victor (1966)
