= Renato Cioni =

Italian opera singer

Renato Cioni (photo with 1960 dedication)

Renato Cioni (15 April 1929 – 4 March 2014) was an Italian operatic lyric tenor, particularly associated with the Italian repertory.

Born in Portoferraio on the Isle of Elba, the son of a fisherman, Cioni received his main musical education at the Cherubini Conservatory in Florence. In 1956, as a result of winning an international voice contest organized by the Rome Opera, he made his stage debut at Spoleto, as Edgardo in Lucia di Lammermoor. Earlier that same year he had appeared as Pinkerton, in a television production of Madama Butterfly, opposite another debutante, Anna Moffo.

Cioni's career expanded thereafter, with debuts in such cities as Rome, Naples, Palermo, Venice, Genoa, Trieste, Bologna, and Catania. He made his La Scala debut on 4 March 1961, as Pinkerton, under Gianandrea Gavazzeni.

Outside of Italy, in 1959, Cioni made his American debut at the Academy of Music in Philadelphia, followed by a concert performance of Il duca d'Alba at Carnegie Hall in New York, which he had also sung earlier that year at the Spoleto Festival. He made his debut at the San Francisco Opera in 1961, as Edgardo. His UK debut was at the Royal Opera House, Covent Garden in 1962. His Metropolitan Opera was in 1970, as Pollione, opposite Joan Sutherland and Marilyn Horne.

Cioni made a number of commercial recordings of opera, including studio recordings of Lucia di Lammermoor and Rigoletto, opposite Joan Sutherland, in 1961. His 1964 performance at La Scala as Alfredo in La traviata, opposite Anna Moffo and Mario Sereni, under Herbert von Karajan was also released commercially. He appeared in the Italian show The Winner Is on 8 December 2012.

Cioni died in Portoferraio on 4 March 2014. His wife Loretta and their four children survive him.

== Sources ==
- Biography taken from the original booklet of the 1961 studio recording of Lucia di Lammermoor with Joan Sutherland, under John Pritchard, plus additional information from Operissimo.com.
