= Charles Hackett =

American opera singer

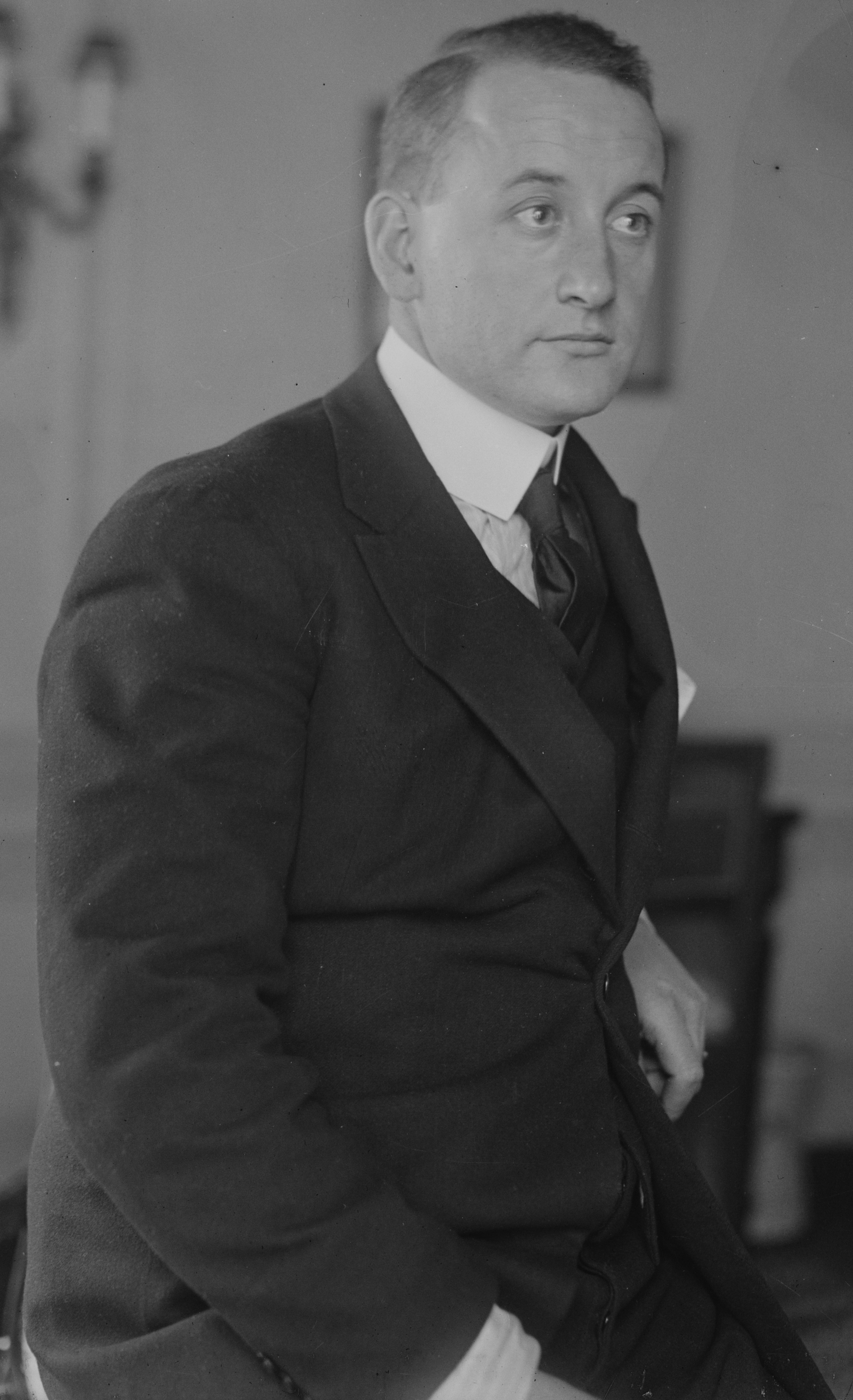
Charles Hackett c. 1918

Charles Hackett (November 4, 1889 – January 1, 1942) sometimes referred to as Carlo Hackett, was an American lyric tenor.

== Biography ==
He was born on November 4, 1889, in Worcester, Massachusetts.

Hackett studied first at the New England Conservatory in Boston with Arthur J. Hubbard, and later with Vincenzo Lombardi in Florence. He made his stage debut in Genoa, as Wilhelm Meister in Mignon, in 1914.

He sang in Italy and South America, where he debuted at the Teatro Colón in Buenos Aires in 1917 as Ruggero in La Rondine, before making his debut at the Metropolitan Opera on January 31, 1919, as Almaviva. He appeared there for three seasons, also as Lindoro, Roméo, Il duca di Mantova, Alfredo, Rodolfo, Pinkerton, Wilhelm Meister, Cavaradossi, Don Ottavio, Vincent and Des Grieux. He also sang at the Lyric Opera of Chicago from 1923 until 1934. He returned to the Metropolitan on February 3, 1934, as Roméo, and performed there for another five years. Hackett made a number of recordings for Edison and Columbia, notably duets with Maria Barrientos and Rosa Ponselle, in which one can appreciate a singer with a fine technique and a certain elegance.

He died on New Year's Day, January 1, 1942, in Manhattan, New York City

== Sources ==
- The Metropolitan Opera Encyclopedia, edited by David Hamilton, (Simon & Schuster, New York, 1987) ISBN 0-671-61732-X
- Metropolitan Opera Database
