= Giuseppe Modesti =

Italian opera singer (1915–1998)

Giuseppe Modesti (photo with 1946 dedication)

Giuseppe Modesti (1915–1998) was an Italian bass-baritone.

Giuseppe Modesti made his operatic debut at La Scala in 1940, as Schelkalov in Boris Godunov. His career was then interrupted by conscription in 1942, but he resumed his career in 1945.

For the next twenty-five years he sang a wide repertoire as a regular member of La Scala company, also appearing in the rest of Italy, as well as Europe, the United States and South America.

In 1954, he created the role of Abner in Darius Milhaud's David, and in 1965 he took part in the first performance of Piero Manzoni's controversial stage work Atomted.

He can be heard in a number of live recordings, notably Parsifal (as Klingsor), Il trovatore, Lucia di Lammermoor (conducted by Herbert von Karajan), Medea, La sonnambula (both conducted by Leonard Bernstein), and Norma, all opposite Maria Callas. He was also part of the first recordings of Linda di Chamounix, Oberto, and Medea.

== Studio recordings ==
- Verdi: La forza del destino (Guerrini, Pirazzini, Campora, Colzani, Corena; Parodi, p. 1952) Urania
- Verdi: Aida (Callas, Barbieri, Tucker, Gobbi; Serafin, 1955) EMI
- Cherubini: Medea (Callas, Scotto, Pirazzini, Picchi; Serafin, 1957) Ricordi/EMI
- Puccini: La bohème (Stella, Rizzoli, Poggi, Capecchi; Molinari-Pradelli, 1957) Philips
- Puccini: La bohème (Scotto, Meneguzzer, Poggi, Gobbi; Votto, 1961) Deutsche Grammophon

== Sources ==
- Evelino, Abeni, Giuseppe Modesti: I suoi personaggi (Giuseppe Modesti: His roles), Azzali, 2006. ISBN 88-88252-34-7
- Kutsch, K.J. and Riemens, Leo, "Modesti, Giuseppe", Unvergängliche Stimmen (Everlasting Voices), Francke, 1975, p. 447. ISBN 3-7720-1145-4
- Palmer, Andrew, Liner Notes for Oberto (complete recording), GALA 880155.
