= Nicolas Flagello =

American composer and conductor (1928–1994)

- Born: March 15, 1928; New York City, U.S.
- Died: March 16, 1994 (aged 66); New Rochelle, New York, U.S.
- Works: The Passion of Martin Luther King; The Judgment of Saiint Francis; The Sisters
- Website: flagello.com/index.html

Nicolas Oreste Flagello (March 15, 1928 – March 16, 1994) was an American composer and conductor of classical music. He was one of the last American composers to develop a distinctive mode of expression based wholly on the principles and techniques of late romanticism.

== Biography ==
=== Early life ===
Nicolas Flagello was born in New York City, into a musical family. His father Dionisio was an amateur oboist, his mother Genoveffa was a vocalist and his maternal grandfather Domenico Casiello was a composer who is reputed to have studied with Giuseppe Verdi. His brother Ezio Flagello was a bass who sang at the Metropolitan Opera. After his family emigrated to the United States from Salerno, Nicolas continued to enjoy strong family ties with his Italian relatives which created a lasting impression on him. At the age of three, he undertook piano lessons with a maternal aunt, and soon began voice lessons, studies on the violin and lessons on several woodwind instruments. By the age of seven he appeared in public recitals as a pianist and also vocalized as a boy-soprano earning the nickname "Il Poccolo Caruso".

In the 1930s, Flagello embarked upon an Old World apprenticeship with the Italian-American composer Vittorio Giannini, who introduced his young student to the grand European tradition of composition with an emphasis on such composers as Palestrina, Puccini, Debussy, Rachmaninoff and Strauss. Over time, the apprenticeship evolved into a close personal and professional relationship between the two composers which lasted until Giannini's death in 1966.

As student at the Evander Childs High School in the Bronx, Flagello appeared as a violinist in Leopold Stokowski's All-American youth Orchestra in the 1940s. After graduating in 1944, Flagello refused a scholarship to study engineering at New York University to the dismay of his parents, who opposed his decision to embark upon a career in music. He devoted the following year to a course of study on the piano with Adele Marcus. In 1945, he resumed studying composition with Giannini at the Manhattan School of Music and undertook studies in conducting with Jonel Perlea. Upon graduating (M.M., 1950) he joined the faculty, where he remained for more than 25 years.

In 1955, Flagello won a Fulbright Fellowship to study at the Accademia Nazionale di Santa Cecilia in Rome where he worked under Ildebrando Pizzetti and was awarded the advanced degree Diploma di Studi Superiori in 1956. Several years later in the 1960s he also acquired teaching responsibilities at the Curtis Institute of Music with Gianinni's assistance. By this time, Gianinni was in poor health and endeavored to convince Flagello to join him on the faculty of the newly established North Carolina School of the Arts in 1965. Flagello, however, hoped to remain in New York in order to continue building his reputation and declined Gianinni's offer.

=== Composer ===
External image
- Nicolas Flagello at the Manhattan School of Music in 1983. Here on msmnyc.edu.edu

As a composer, Flagello held firmly to a philosophical belief in music as a personal medium for emotional and spiritual expression. Following Gianinni's lead, he embraced the view that musical creativity is a gift from God which should be expressed by his students with both humility and gratitude. He was also convinced that true creativity embodied a dedication to the ideals of inner truth and personal authenticity. With this in mind, he inscribed his scores with the latin abbreviation AMDG (Ad Maiorem Dei Gloria) and ignored practical considerations which might have promoted his compositions more widely.

This unfashionable view, together with his vehement rejection of the serialism that dominated musical composition for several decades after World War II, hindered his music from attracting significant attention during much of his lifetime. Consequently, his music has been described as, "a lament of existential loneliness-the loneliness of a stranger in his own time, the last member of a dying race....it also speaks with the defiance of one who refuses to relinquish long-cherished values, who struggles to maintain spiritual purity in a world filled with fraudulence and cynicism." Yet it also reflects a devotion to the aesthetic principles and craftmanship imparted to Flagello by his mentor Giannini. His musical vocabulary has been likened to that of Ernest Bloch in its fusion of several European musical dialects from the Late-Romantic era into an Expressionism which features both tonality and atonality. Flagello's music, however, reflects a different ethnic heritage which calls to mind the theatricality of the Italian opera and the phraseology of the Italian language.

Flagello's compositions include approximately seventy-five works which have been grouped into: an early period ending in 1958, a transition period (1958-1958), and a mture period (1959-1985). Among his most auspicious successes were the oratorio The Passion of Martin Luther King (1968), premiered in Washington, DC, in 1974, and the opera The Judgment of St. Francis (1959), presented at the Cathedral of St. Francis in Assisi in 1982. He produced a large body of work, including seven operas, two symphonies, eight concertos, and numerous orchestral, choral, chamber, and vocal compositions. In 1964 he was commissioned by the American Accordionists Association to compose his challenging Introduction and Scherzo for solo accordion in an effort to, "show off the virtuosity of the instrument just as all other music has been written for all the other instruments in the past."

As a conductor, he made many recordings with the Orchestra Sinfonica di Roma and the Orchestra da Camera di Roma, focusing on repertoire from the Baroque to the 20th century. His collaborators included the internationally acclaimed operatic diva Leontyne Price, Jeanette Scovotti and several leading Italian vocalists including Carlo Bergonzi and Mario Sereni. He also conducted at the Chicago Lyric Opera and the New York City Opera.

In the mid-1980s, his career was cut short by a degenerative disease, at which time a number of his works were left without orchestration. Many of these works were later orchestrated by composer and editor Anthony Sbordoni. Since his death Flagello's music has generated a greater following, and many of his major works have been recorded. His opera Beyond the Horizon premiered in New York City in September 2024.

=== Death ===
Flagello died in New Rochelle, New York, on March 16, 1994. He was married to Dianne (Danese) Flagello, and was the father of two sons, Donis G. Flagello and Vittorio P. Flagello. Dianne Flagello has carried on his legacy since his death by founding the publishing company Maelos Music, and the website Flagello.com, to publish and publicize his works. His granddaughter is American composer Gala Flagello.

== Reviews ==
At first, Nicolas Flagello's compositions were not eagerly embraced by his critics. This was partially due to his unambiguous disapproval of the emphasis placed upon the use of quasi-mathematical compositional techniques by composers of the Modernist tradition in New York City during his tenure at the Manhattan School of Music. His Misa Sinfonica (1957), for example, was dismissed by William Flanagan as, "conservative in feeling, purple in harmony, razzle-dazzle and a mite trashy in orchestration...One wonders what interest Mr. Flagello's piece could hold for anyone of cultivated, sophisticated musical taste."

By 1961, however, Flagello's production of The Sisters(1958) at the Manhattan School Opera Theater garnered a more favorable review by John Gruen who described it as, "first rate, at least musically. Mr. Flagello has the gift of writing gratefully for the voice, and his music has melodic sumptuousness. His orchestral texture is crystal-clear, and he knows how to underline dramatic events." Several years later the critic Richard Freed praised the premier of Flagello's Sonata for Violin and Piano (1963) as, "a well constructed, highly romantic work in three concise movements, ranging from a dark impassioned dialogue for the two instruments to a warmly lyrical quasi recitativo to a humoresque-tarantella of almost diabolical brilliance..." Similarly, the Manhattan School's production of Flagello's opera The Judgement of Saint Francis(1959) received favorable reviews from Allen Hughes and The New Yorker's Winthrop Sargeant who described it as, "musically the most vigorous new opera I have come across in a long time...[Flagello] has shown an unmistakable and totally unconfused talent for the operatic theatre".

Flagello's virtuosic Introduction and Scherzo (1964) for accordion has been described as an "athletic" and well crafted composition which is characterized by an, "unrelenting violent, melodramatic, bombastic nature and dissonant but standard extended terian harmonies, some would call "way out" or extremely modern. However, it is actually more traditional in style than the novice to "New Music" might think."

Flagello's recordings as a conductor on Paul Kapp's Serenus label also resulted in favorable reviews in 1964. Arthur Cohn praised Flagello's, "stimulating ingenuity in using harmonic materials.." and defended his orthodox compositional approach by noting that, "It is not necessary to be a revolutionary. If a music manifests fresh melodicism, expressed by freed triadic prose and certified by rhythmic ripeness, it needs no apology.." The music critic for The New Records publication Enos E. Shupp Jr concurred by proclaiming, "If this is not great music, we will gladly turn in our typewriter and quit."

== Selected recordings ==
- Symphony No. 1; Theme, Variations, and Fugue; Sea Cliffs; Piper Intermezzo (Slovak Radio SO, D. Amos, cond) Naxos 8.559148
- Cello Capriccio (G. Koutzen, cello); Contemplazioni di Michelangelo (N. Tatum, soprano); Lautrec; Remembrance (M. Randolph, soprano; Orch. Sinf. di Roma, N. Flagello, cond) Phoenix PHCD-125
- Piano Sonata; Prelude, Ostinato, and Fugue; Violin Sonata; Declamation; Nocturne et al. (S. Nagata, violin; P. Vinograde, piano) Albany TROY-234
- Piano Concertos Nos. 2, 3 (T. Rankovich, piano); Credendum (E. Oliveira, violin); Overture Burlesca; A Goldoni Overture (Slovak Phil, Kosice, D. Amos, cond) Artek AR-0002-2
- Piano Concerto No. 1 (T. Rankovich, piano); Dante's Farewell (S. Gonzalez, soprano; National RSO of Ukraine, J. M. Williams, cond); Concerto Sinfonico (New Hudson Sax Qt, Rutgers SO, K. Johns, cond) Naxos 8.559296
- Symphony No. 2; Odyssey; Valse Noire; Concerto Sinfonico (U. of Houston Sax Qt, Wind Ensemble, D. Bertman, cond) Naxos 8.573060
- Violin Concerto (E. Oliveira, violin); Mirra Interlude and Dance; Symphonic Aria; The Sisters: Interludio; Songs (S. Gonzalez, soprano; National RSO of Ukraine, J. M. Williams, cond) Artek AR-0036-2
- Passion of Martin Luther King; The Land; L'Infinito (E. Flagello, bass-baritone; N. Flagello, cond) Naxos 8.112065
- Harp Sonata (E. Goodman) BIS CD-319

== Principal works ==
- You may hear Nicolas Flagello's; Contemplazioni Di Michelangelo and An Island in the Moon (William Blake); Here on archive.org

=== Operas ===
- The Wig (1954); libretto by composer, after Pirandello
- Mirra (1955); libretto by composer, after Alfieri
- Rip Van Winkle (1957); operetta for children, libretto by Christopher Fiore
- The Sisters (1958); libretto by Dean Mundy
- The Judgment of St. Francis (1959); libretto by Armand Aulicino
- The Piper of Hamelin (1970); opera for children, libretto by composer, after Browning
- Beyond the Horizon (1983); libretto by composer and W. Simmons, after O'Neill

=== Orchestral works ===
- Beowulf (1949)
- Suite for Amber (1951)
- Symphonic Aria (1951)
- Overture Burlesca (1952)
- Interlude and Dance fm. Mirra (1955)
- Theme, Variations, and Fugue (1956)
- Missa Sinfonica (1957)
- Concerto for String Orchestra (1959)
- Lautrec Ballet Suite (1965)
- A Goldoni Overture (1967)
- Symphony No. 1 (1968)
- Serenata (1968)
- Symphony No. 2 (for winds and percussion; 1970)

=== Instrumental works with orchestra ===
- Piano Concerto No. 1 (1950)
- Concerto Antoniano for Flute and Orchestra (1953)
- Piano Concerto No. 2 (1956)
- Violin Concerto (1956)
- Capriccio for Cello and Orchestra (1962)
- Piano Concerto No. 3 (1962)
- Credendum for Violin and Orchestra (1973)
- Concerto Sinfonico for Saxophone Quartet and Orchestra/Band (1985)

=== Vocal and choral works with orchestra ===
- The Land (song cycle, Tennyson, bass-baritone and chamber orchestra; 1954)
- Tristis est Anima Mea (SATB, orchestra; 1959)
- Dante's Farewell (monodrama, soprano and orchestra, text by J. Tusiani; 1962)
- Contemplazioni di Michelangelo (soprano and orchestra; 1964)
- An Island in the Moon (soprano/tenor and orchestra, Wm. Blake, 1964)
- Te Deum for All Mankind (SATB, orchestra; 1967)
- Passion of Martin Luther King [oratorio] (bass-baritone, SATB, orchestra; 1968)
- Remembrance (soprano, flute, strings/stg. qt., E. Bronte, 1971)
- Canto (soprano, orchestra, poem by composer, 1978)

=== Piano ===
- Etude, Homage to Chopin (1941)
- Three Dances (1945)
- Symphonic Waltzes (1958)
- Prelude, Ostinato, and Fugue (1960)
- Piano Sonata (1962)
- Concertino for Piano, Brass, and Timpani (1963)

=== Chamber music ===
- Chorale and Episode for Brass Dectet (1944)
- Lyra for Brass Sextet (1945)
- Episodes for Woodwind Quintet (1957)
- Burlesca for Flute and Guitar (1961)
- Sonata for Violin and Piano (1963)
- Valse Noire for Saxophone Quartet (1964)
- Suite for Harp and String Trio (1965)
- Declamation for Violin and Piano (1967)
- Philos for Brass Quintet (1969)
- Nocturne for Violin and Piano (1969)
- Ricercare for 19 Brass and Percussion (1971)

=== Miscellaneous ===
- Divertimento for Piano and Percussion (1960)
- Harp Sonata (1961)
- Introduction and Scherzo (1964) for Accordion
- Electra (1966) for Piano, Harp, and Percussion
- Marionettes (1968) for Harp
- Odyssey (1981) for Band

Numerous songs for voice and piano

== Sources ==
- Simmons, Walter (2006) [2004]. Voices in the Wilderness: Six American Neo-Romantic Composers. Lanham, MD: Scarecrow Press. ISBN 0-8108-5728-6. OCLC 65182234 – via Internet Archive.
- Odyssey: Birth of a New Work [video documentary, 1981, Educational Audio Visual Inc.] https://www.youtube.com/watch?v=YPYorwNr5lE
- https://www.flagello.com/[composer website]
