= Vera Franceschi =

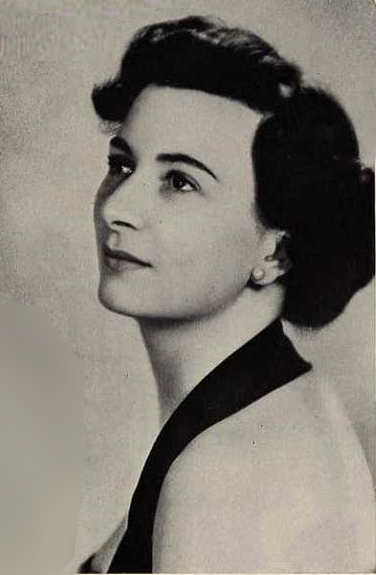
- Vera Franceschi in the 1950s

Background information
- Born: May 5, 1926; San Francisco, California, U.S.
- Died: July 12, 1966 (aged 40) New York City, New York, U.S.
- Genres: Classical
- Occupation: Pianist
- Instrument: Piano
- Years active: 1942-1966

Vera Franceschi (May 5, 1926 – July 12, 1966) was an Italian American pianist who had a prolific career during the 1950s.

== Life and career ==
The daughter of Italian parents (both of Tuscan origin), she was born in San Francisco, California. She began her studies in the United States; but in 1936 moved with her family to Rome, Italy.

In 1939, at a very young age, she graduated from the Accademia Nazionale di Santa Cecilia (Santa Cecilia Conservatory), where she was able to study with Alfredo Casella and Germano Arnaldi. She debuted at eighteen as a soloist at the Teatro alla Scala in Milan. During the same time, she began recording for Parlophon. Later she moved to Cetra Records.

After World War II, she perfected her training at the Manhattan School of Music in New York, studying with Harold Bauer and Carl Friedberg, and in 1948 she made her debut with the San Francisco Symphony Orchestra under the direction of Pierre Monteux. She became one of the most acclaimed interpreters of Chopin during those years. In the early 1950s, she signed with RCA and then Victrola, and recorded many albums performing the compositions of the Polish composer. During the same time, she met the tenor Daniele Barioni, whom she married on October 28, 1957 in New York and with whom she had a son in 1958. He was named Giulio Barioni.

After a long hospitalization for leukemia at Columbia Presbyterian Medical Center in New York, she died in July 1966.

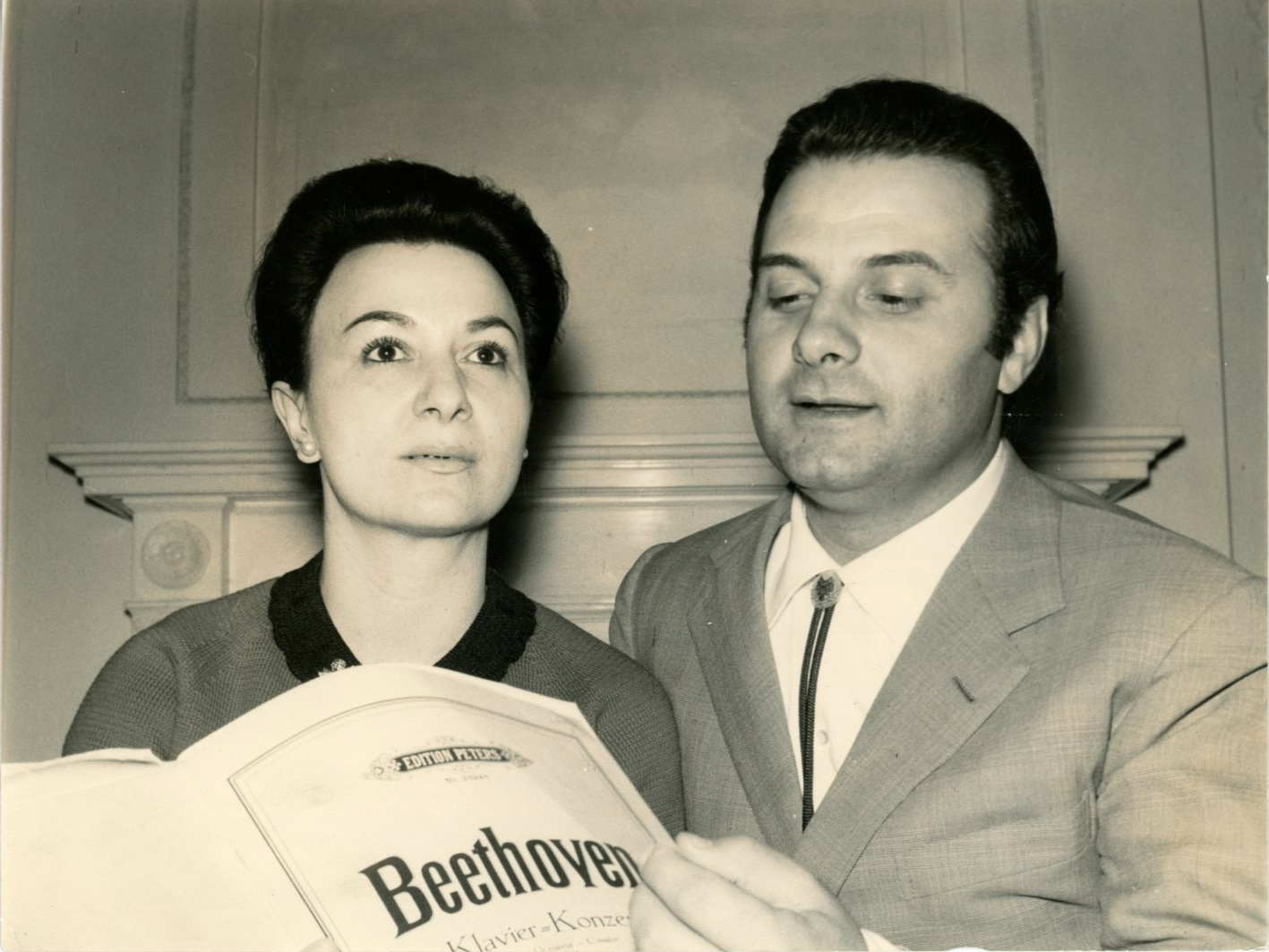
Daniele Barioni & Vera Franceschi circa 1962

== Partial discography ==
=== 78 rpm ===
- 1949: Sonata in sol minore n° 5/Sonata in do minore n° 1/Sonata in mi bemolle maggiore n° 2 (Cetra, CB 20273)
- 1949: Sonata/Toccata (Cetra, CB 20274)

=== 33 rpm ===
- 1955: Muzio Clementi - 4 Sonatas for Piano (Westminster, WN 18091)
- 1956: Luigi Cherubini - 6 Sonatas for Clavier (Westminster, XWN 18276)
- 1959: Domenico Cimarosa - 32 sonate per pianoforte vol. 1 (Victrola, KV 104)
- 1966: Chopin - VALZER - Raccolta completa (RCA Victrola, KV 159)

== Bibliography ==
- Pianista Vera Franceschi, published on Musica e dischi n° 31 of January 1949, pag. 1
