= Francesco Dominici (tenor) =

Italian opera singer

- Born: Francisco Fernàndez Dominicis; 28 November 1883; La Habana, Cuba
- Died: 3 February 1968 (aged 84); Havana, Cuba
- Occupation: Opera singer (tenor)
- Known for: The Magic Flute; Falstaff; La favorite; La Rondine; Turandot

Francesco Dominici (28 November 1883 – 3 February 1968) was a Spanish-Cuban operatic tenor particularly admired for his acting in comedic roles.

== Biography ==
Dominici was born in La Habana, Cuba in 1883 and made his debit as a member of the chorus in Marina] by Emilio Arrieta in 1902 and studied under Spanish bass Pablo Meroles and in 1906 in Mefistififele at the Conservatoire de Musiuca y Declamacion de La Habbana.

He made his professional opera debut in 1912 as Cavarodosi in Tosca as and after arriving featured as Fernando in Donizetti's La favorite at the Teatro Donizetti in Bergamo, Italy in 1914.

He created the role of Prunier in the original 1917 production of Puccini's La rondine at the Grand Théâtre de Monte Carlo, a role which he performed at many other opera houses including the Teatro Comunale di Bologna.

Over the next several years he played mostly leading roles at the Teatro Costanzi in Rome including Rodolfo in Puccini's La bohème, Fenton in Verdi's Falstaff, and the Ernesto in Donizetti's Don Pasquale.

In the early 1920s he joined the roster at La Scala where he began playing more buffo roles than leading roles. In 1921, he sang the role of doctor Cajus in Verdi's Falstaff at La Scala and in 1922 was Filipeto in the company's first production of Ermanno Wolf-Ferrari's I quatro rusteghi.

In 1926 he created the role of Emperor Altoum in the original production of Puccini's Turandot at La Scala. In 1929 he went on tour with La Scala to Germany.

Other roles that Dominici performed at La Scala include David in Wagner's Die Meistersinger von Nürnberg, Monostatos in Mozart's The Magic Flute, and the Neipperg in Umberto Giordano's Madame Sans-Gêne.

In 1931 he moved to Cuba, where he taught music for many years.

Dominici died in Havana on 3 February 1968, aged 84
