= Fantasio Piccoli =

Italian theatre director (1917–1981)

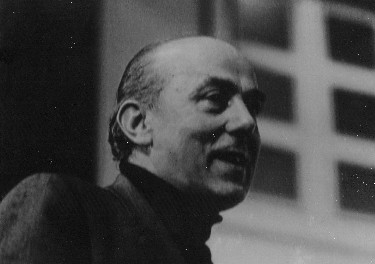
- Born: 24 March 1917; Milan, Italy
- Died: 27 October 1981 (aged 64); Milan, Italy
- Occupation: theatre director

Fantasio Piccoli (24 March 1917 – 27 October 1981) was an Italian theatre director.

== Life and career ==
Born in Milan, the son of the author Valentino, in 1947 Piccoli founded and directed the stage company "Compagnia del Carrozzone" (also known just as "Il Carrozzone"), a company consisting of ten young actors (including Romolo Valli and Adriana Asti) who held stagings in about two hundred cities in three years. In 1950 he and most of his company moved to Bolzano, where Piccoli founded the Teatro Stabile, which he directed until 1966; in Bolzano, he "put into practice his idea of an anti-realistic theater, founded on the primacy of the poetic language, and on the expressive autonomy of a transfiguring imagination." At the Teatro Stabile he directed seventy four stagings, mainly based on Italian authors.
