= Glade Peterson =

American opera singer

Glade Peterson (1928 - April 21, 1990) was an American tenor from the U.S. state of Utah. He was born in Milburn and grew up in Fairview before moving to New York to further his education, only returning to his home state in 1976. Over the course of his career, he performed with the Metropolitan Opera, the San Francisco Opera, the Houston Grand Opera, and the Zurich Opera, and he founded Utah Opera. He was buried in the Salt Lake City Cemetery.
