= Renato Capecchi =

Italian opera singer (1923–1998

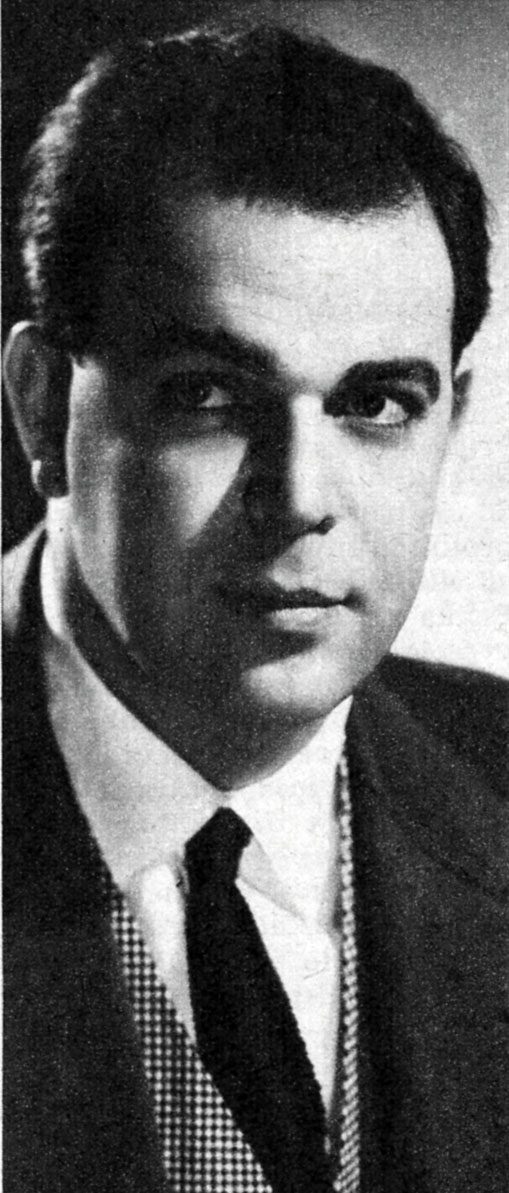
Renato Capecchi

Renato Capecchi (November 6, 1923, in Cairo – June 30, 1998, in Milan) was an Italian baritone, actor, and opera director.

Renato Capecchi in Billy Budd, Teatro la Fenice, Venice, 1950.

He sang in the Italian premiere of Shostakovich's The Nose and Prokofiev's War and Peace, and in the world premieres of Gian Francesco Malipiero's La donna è mobile, Giorgio Federico Ghedini's Billy Budd and Lord Inferno, and Sylvano Bussotti's L'ispirazione.

In 1951, Capecchi made his New York Metropolitan Opera debut as Germont in La traviata and sang regularly in leading roles there until 1954. After a period of singing primarily in European opera houses, he returned in 1975 to the Metropolitan Opera, where he specialized in smaller comic roles in otherwise tragic operas such as the Sacristan in Tosca and Benoit and Alcindoro in La bohème.

Amongst the productions Capecchi directed were The Daughter of the Regiment at New York City Opera (1985), Così fan tutte in Susa, Italy (1978), and the US premiere of Giuseppe Gazzaniga's Don Giovanni Tenorio, ossia Il convitato di pietra with the San Francisco Opera Merola Opera Program, in Saratoga, California (1977).

Recordings are available of him as Figaro (Mozart and Rossini), Dandini, Riccardo, Rigoletto, Belfiore, Melitone, Ford, Jago, Scarpia, and, in an Italian translation-performance of Die Meistersinger von Nürnberg, Beckmesser. There is a DVD of Capecchi as Don Bartolo with Jennifer Larmore as Rosina in The Barber of Seville staged at Netherlands Opera in a 1992 production by Dario Fo.

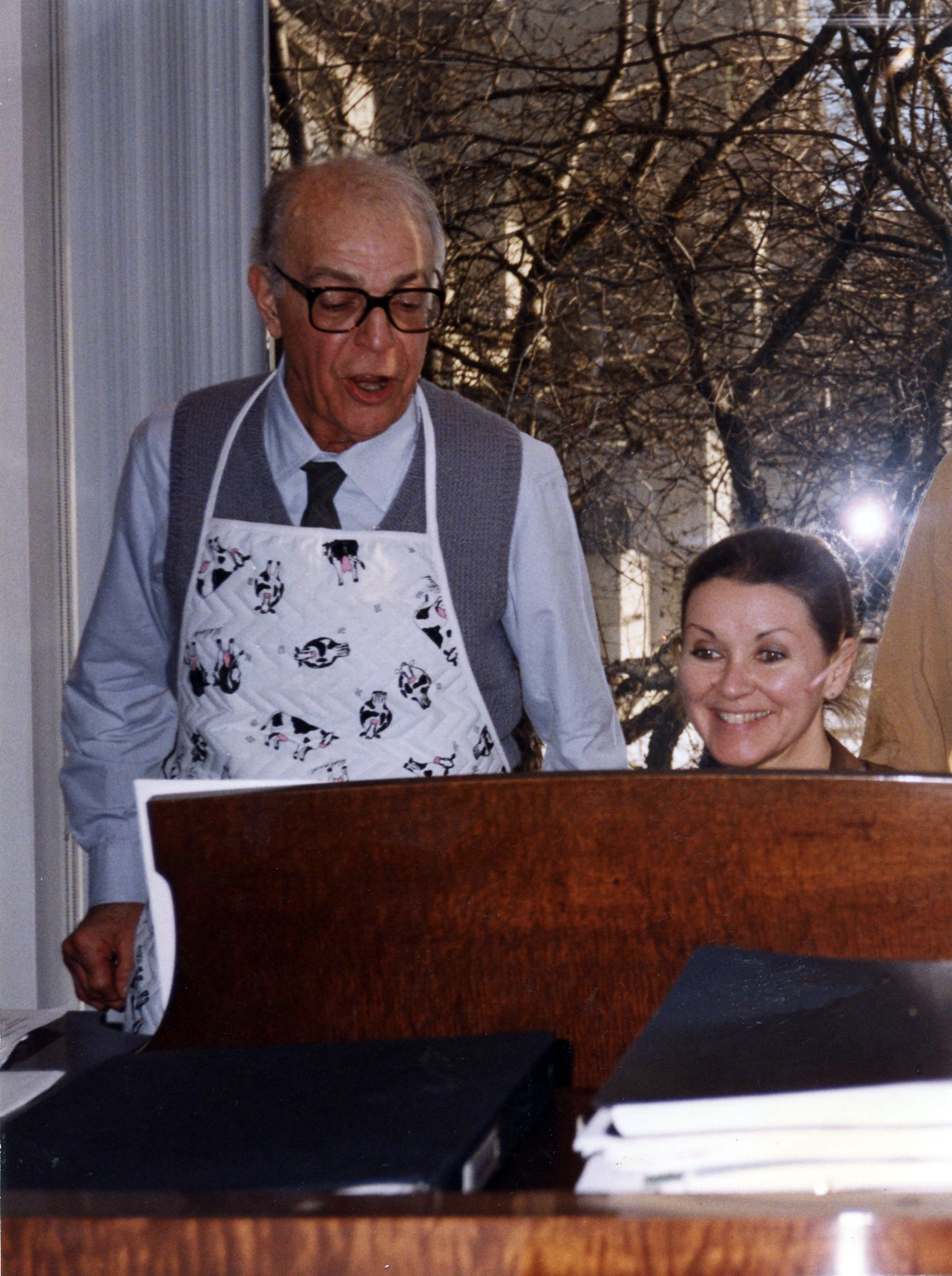
Capecchi accompanied by Denise Massé at her home in Montreal, (circa 1995)

"Non più andrai, from Mozart's Le nozze di figaro"
Performed by Renato Capecchi, 1961

== Bibliography ==
- Erik Eriksson, 'Renato Capecchi', Classical Artist Biographies, All Media Guide, 2006. (accessed 7 November 2007)
- Forbes, Elizabeth (July 13, 1998). "Obituary: Renato Capecchi". The Independent.
- Kozinn, Allan (July 4, 1998). "Renato Capecchi, 74, Who Sang Comic Roles in Tragic Operas". The New York Times.
- Metropolitan Opera Data Base. (accessed 7 November 2007)
