= Anna Moffo =

American opera singer, television personality, and actress (1932–2006)

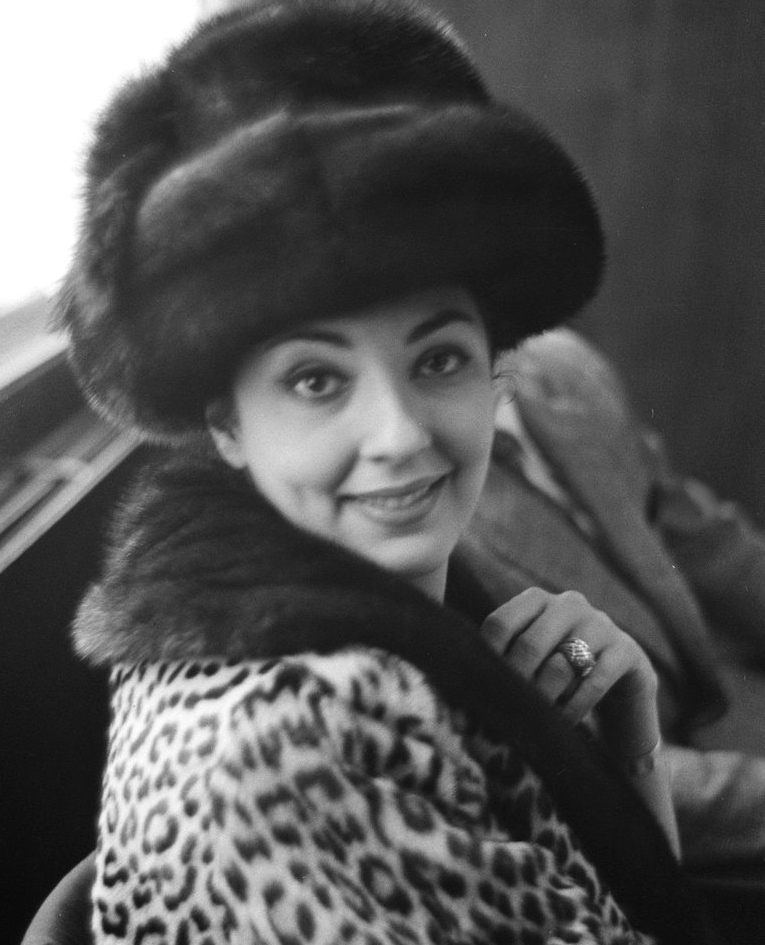
- Moffo in 1962
- Born: June 27, 1932; Wayne, Pennsylvania, U.S.
- Died: March 9, 2006 (aged 73); New York City, U.S.
- Occupations: Opera singer (soprano); television personality; actress
- Years active: 1956–1974
- Spouses: Mario Lanfranchi (m. 1957; div. 1972); Robert Sarnoff (m. 1974; died 1997)

Anna Moffo (June 27, 1932 – March 9, 2006) was an American opera singer, television personality, and actress. One of the leading lyric-coloratura sopranos of her generation, she possessed a warm and radiant voice of considerable range and agility. Noted for her physical beauty, she was nicknamed "La Bellissima".

Winning a Fulbright scholarship to study in Italy, Moffo became popular there after performing leading operatic roles on three RAI television productions in 1956. She returned to America for her debut at the Lyric Opera of Chicago on October 16, 1957. In New York, her Metropolitan Opera debut took place on November 14, 1959. She performed at the Met for over seventeen seasons. Moffo's earliest recordings were made for EMI Records; she signed an exclusive contract with RCA Victor in 1960, recording for the company until the late 1970s. In the early 1960s, she hosted her own show on Italian television and appeared in several operatic films along with other non-singing roles.

In the early 1970s Moffo extended her international popularity to Germany through operatic performances, TV appearances, and several films, all while continuing her American operatic performances. Due to an extremely heavy workload, Moffo suffered a serious vocal breakdown from which she never fully recovered. Her final appearance at the Metropolitan Opera was in 1983.

== Early life ==
Anna Moffo was born in Philadelphia, Pennsylvania to Italian immigrant parents, Nicola Moffo (a shoemaker) and his wife, Regina (née Cinti) Moffo. After graduating from Radnor High School, Anna turned down an offer to go to Hollywood and instead attended the Curtis Institute of Music in Philadelphia, where she studied with Eufemia Giannini-Gregory, sister of soprano Dusolina Giannini. In 1954, on a Fulbright scholarship, she left for Italy to complete her studies at the Accademia Nazionale di Santa Cecilia in Rome where she was a pupil of Mercedes Llopart and Luigi Ricci. She later studied voice privately in New York City with Beverley Peck Johnson.

== Career ==
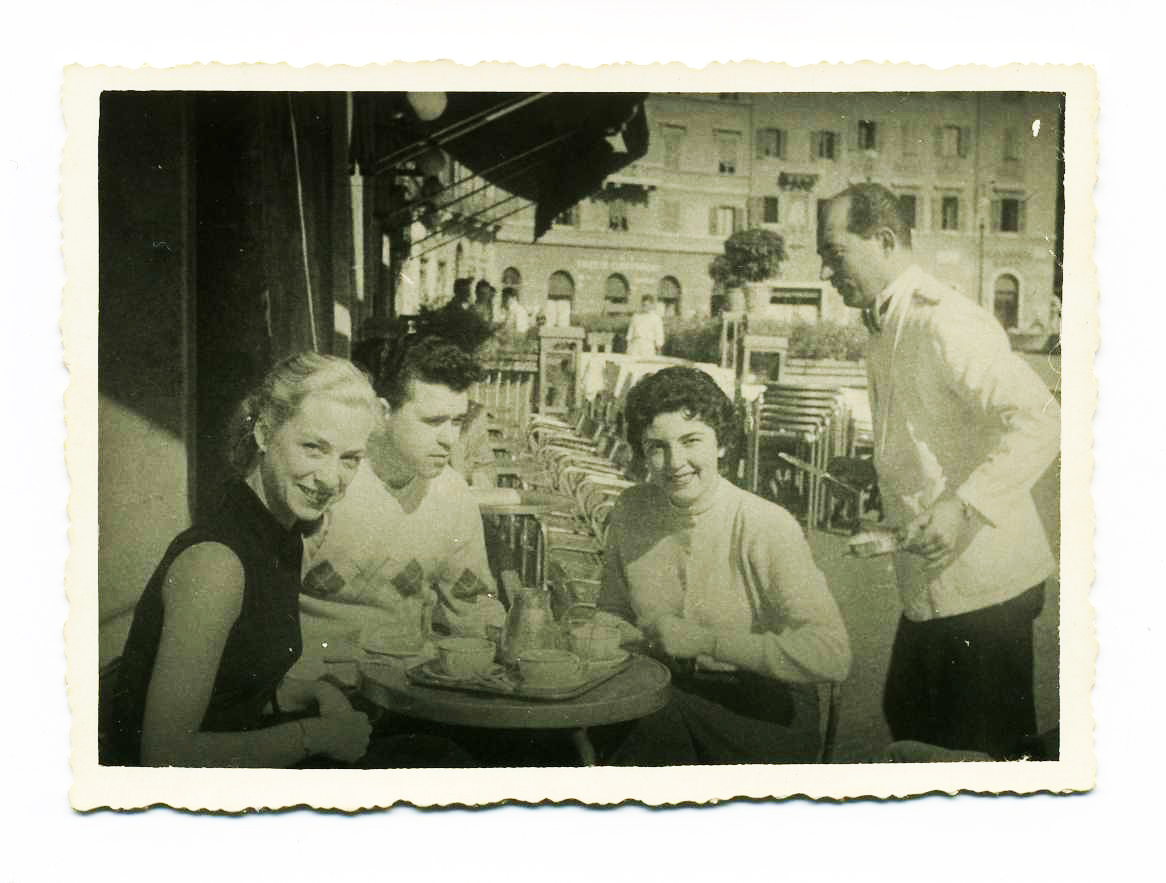
Anna Moffo (right) with Janet Cox-Rearick Waldman (left) at a cafe in Rome in 1954, when both were Fulbright Fellows in Italy

Anna Moffo

Anna Moffo

Moffo made her official operatic debut in 1955 in Spoleto as Norina in Don Pasquale. Shortly after, still virtually unknown and little experienced, she was offered the challenging role of Cio-Cio San in an Italian television (RAI) production of Madama Butterfly. The telecast aired on January 24, 1956, and made Moffo an overnight sensation throughout Italy. Offers quickly followed and she appeared in two other television productions that same year, as Nannetta in Falstaff and as Amina in La sonnambula. She appeared as Zerlina in Don Giovanni, at the Aix-en-Provence Festival and made her recording debut for EMI as Nannetta (Falstaff) under Herbert von Karajan, and as Musetta in La bohème with Maria Callas, Giuseppe Di Stefano and Rolando Panerai. The following year (1957) saw her debut at the Vienna State Opera, the Salzburg Festival, at La Scala in Milan and the Teatro San Carlo in Naples. Moffo returned to America for her debut there, as Mimì in La bohème next to Jussi Björling's Rodolfo, at the Lyric Opera of Chicago on October 16, 1957. Moffo had three other roles at the Lyric that season: Mignon, Le nozze di Figaro (with Tito Gobbi, Giulietta Simionato and Eleanor Steber) and Lucia di Lammermoor. On at least one occasion her performance of Lucia's Mad Scene earned Moffo a 10-minute standing ovation.

Her Metropolitan Opera debut took place on November 14, 1959, as Violetta in La traviata, a part that would quickly become her signature role. She performed at The Metropolitan Opera for seventeen seasons in roles such as Lucia, Gilda, Adina, Mimì, Liù, Nedda, Pamina, Marguerite, Juliette, Manon, Mélisande, Périchole, and the four heroines of Les contes d'Hoffmann. Alfred Lunt's production of La Traviata as part of the opening of the new Metropolitan Opera House in the Lincoln Center in 1966 was mounted especially for her. In the late 1950s, she recorded Susanna in Le nozze di Figaro, opposite Elisabeth Schwarzkopf and Giuseppe Taddei, conducted by Carlo Maria Giulini; and recitals of Mozart arias with EMI. She then became an exclusive RCA Victor artist.

Moffo was also invited to sing at the San Francisco Opera where she made her debut as Amina on October 1, 1960. During that period she also made several appearances on American television, while enjoying a successful international career singing at most major opera houses around the world (Stockholm, Berlin, Monte Carlo, Mexico City, Buenos Aires, etc.). At the Metropolitan Opera in March 1961 with Birgit Nilsson and Franco Corelli she performed in Turandot as Liù, conducted by Leopold Stokowski. She made her debut at the Royal Opera House in London, as Gilda, in a Franco Zeffirelli production of Rigoletto. Shortly after the Italian tenor Sergio Franchi joined RCA Victor, they recorded a popular album of operetta duets, The Dream Duet, which peaked at number ninety seven on the Billboard 200 in 1963. Later that year Franchi and Moffo collaborated in recording excerpts from Die Fledermaus with the Vienna State Orchestra and Chorus conducted by Oskar Danon. In 1999 this album was re-mastered and re-issued in High Performance Stereo.

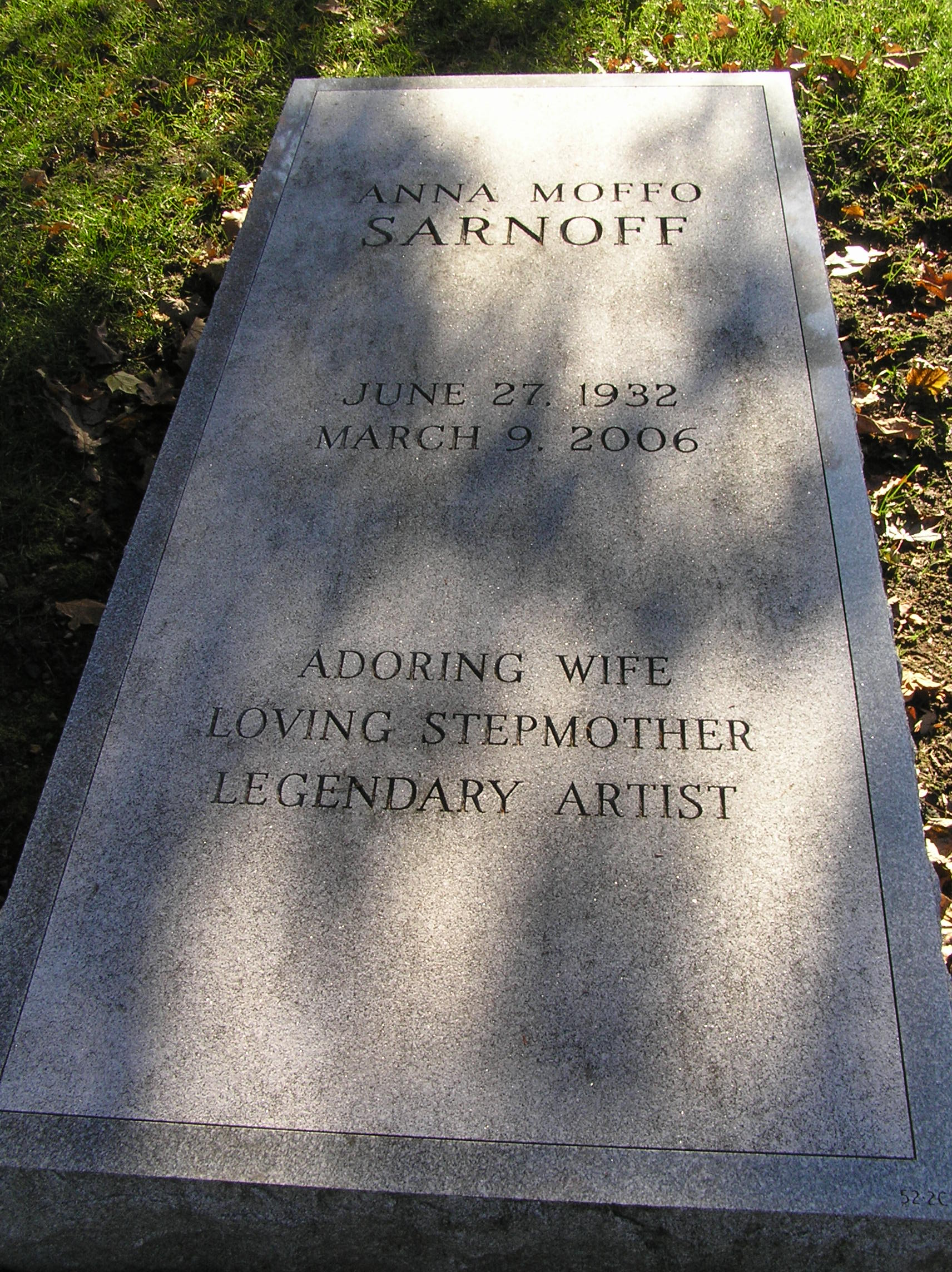
Grave of Anna Moffo Sarnoff in Kensico Cemetery

Moffo remained particularly popular in Italy and performed there regularly. She hosted a program on Italian television "The Anna Moffo Show" (two series: the first in 1964; the second in 1967) and was voted one of the ten most beautiful women in Italy. She appeared in film versions of La traviata (1967) and Lucia di Lammermoor (1971), both produced (with the Italian TV director Sandro Bolchi) and directed by her first husband Mario Lanfranchi, as well as non-operatic films, including Menage all'italiana (1965), the then controversial Una storia d'amore (1970), The Adventurers (1970), A Girl Called Jules (1970), and The Weekend Murders (1970). In the early 1970s, she began appearing on German television and in operetta films such as Die Csárdásfürstin and Die schöne Galathée. She also recorded with Eurodisc a lieder album and the title roles in Carmen and Iphigenie in Aulis, as well as the role of Hänsel in Hänsel und Gretel.

Her heavy workload led to physical exhaustion and serious vocal impairment in 1974, from which she never fully recovered. Although she continued to sing in staged opera through 1980, her appearances became more sporadic. Her last performance at the Met was during the 1983 Centennial celebrations, where she sang the Sigmund Romberg duet "Will You Remember?" with Robert Merrill. After retiring from singing Moffo remained active as a board member of the Metropolitan Opera Guild and by hosting several tributes and giving occasional masterclasses.

== Personal life ==
Moffo was married twice, first to stage and film director Mario Lanfranchi, on December 8, 1957. The couple divorced in 1972. Her second marriage was to Robert Sarnoff, the chairman of the RCA Corporation, on November 14, 1974. He died on February 22, 1997.

Anna Moffo spent the last years of her life in New York City, where she died in 2006 of a stroke at age 73, following a decade-long battle with breast cancer. She is interred with Sarnoff at Kensico Cemetery, Valhalla, New York.

== Filmography ==
Year	Title	Role	Notes
1960	Austerlitz	La Grassini	
1962	La serva padrona	Serpina	
1965	Menage all'italiana	Giovanna	
1967	La traviata	Violetta Valery	
1970	Una storia d'amore	Evy	
1970	The Adventurers	Dania Leonardi	
1970	The Divorce	Elena, Leonardo's wife	
1970	A Girl Called Jules	Lia	
1970	The Weekend Murders	Barbara Worth	
1971	Die Csárdásfürstin	Sylva Varescu	
1971	Lucia di Lammermoor	Lucia	

== Selected recordings ==
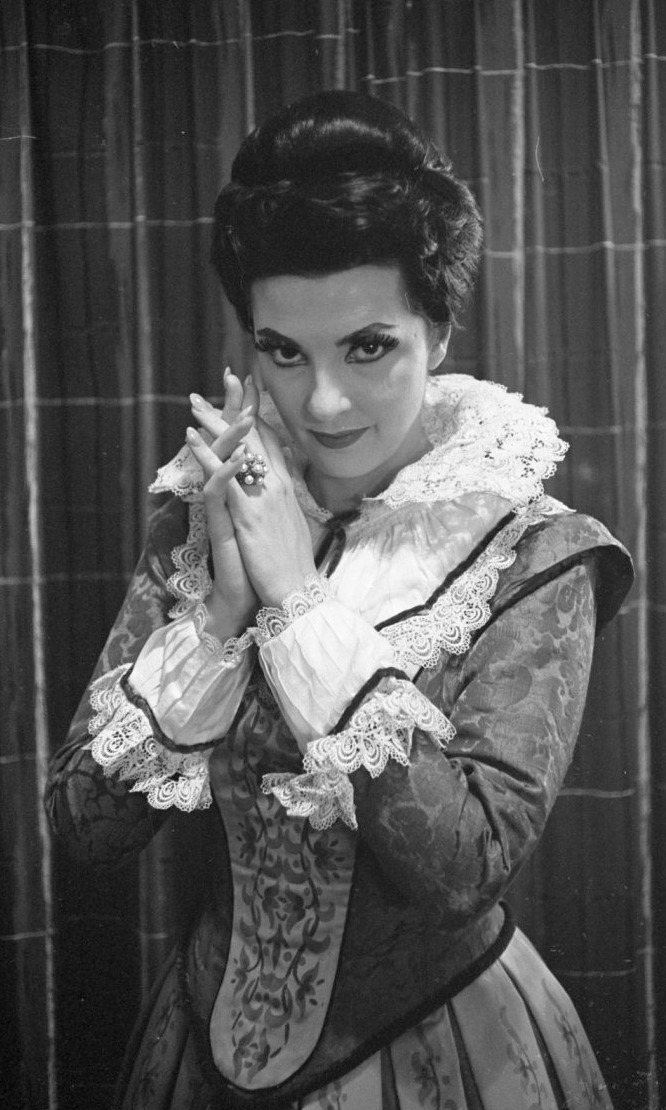
Anna Moffo in 1962

External audio
- You may hear Anna Moffo performing Verdi's "La Traviata" with Richard Tucker, Robert Merrill and the Rome Opera Orchestra conducted by Fernando Previtali in 1961; Here on Archive.org

- 1956 – Puccini – La bohème - Maria Callas, Anna Moffo, Giuseppe Di Stefano, Rolando Panerai - Orchestra del Teatro alla Scala, Milano, Antonino Votto - EMI
- 1957 – Puccini – Madama Butterfly – Anna Moffo, Cesare Valletti, Rosalind Elias, Renato Cesari – Rome Opera Chorus and Orchestra, Erich Leinsdorf - RCA Victor.
- 1959 – Anna Moffo Sings Mozart Arias – Philharmonia Orchestra, Alceo Galliera – EMI
- 1960 – Anna Moffo – Arias from Faust, La bohème, Dinorah, Carmen, Semiramide, Turandot, Lakmé – Rome Opera Orchestra, Tullio Serafin - RCA Victor
- 1960 – Verdi – La traviata – Anna Moffo, Richard Tucker, Robert Merrill – Rome Opera Chorus and Orchestra, Fernando Previtali - RCA Victor
- 1961 – Puccini – La bohème – Anna Moffo, Richard Tucker, Mary Costa, Robert Merrill, Giorgio Tozzi, Philip Maero – Rome Opera Chorus and Orchestra, Erich Leinsdorf - RCA Victor
- 1961 – The Marraige of Figaro – Anna Moffo, Elizabeth Schwarzkopf, Giuseppe Taddei, Eberhard Wächter, Fiorenza Cossotto – Philharmonia Orchestra and Chorus, Carlo Maria Giulini - EMI
- 1962 – Pergolesi – La serva padrona – Anna Moffo, Paolo Montarsolo – Rome Philharmonic Orchestra, Franco Ferrara - RCA Victor
- 1963 – Verdi – Rigoletto – Robert Merrill, Anna Moffo, Alfredo Kraus, Rosalind Elias, Ezio Flagello – The RCA Italiana Opera Chorus and Orchestra, Georg Solti - RCA Victor
- 1963 – Puccini – Manon Lescaut (Highlights) – Anna Moffo, Flaviano Labò, Robert Kerns – The RCA Italiana Opera Orchestra and Chorus, René Leibowitz - RCA Victor
- 1963 – Massenet – Manon (Highlights) – Anna Moffo, Giuseppe Di Stefano, Robert Kerns – The RCA Italiana Opera Orchestra and Chorus, René Leibowitz - RCA Victor
- 1963 – A Verdi Collaboration – RCA Italiana Orchestra, Franco Ferrara – RCA Victor
- 1964 – Canteloube: Songs of the Auvergne / Villa-Lobos: Bachianas Brasileiras / Rachmaninoff: Vocalise – Anna Moffo – American Symphony Orchestra, Leopold Stokowski - RCA Victor
- 1964 – Verdi – Luisa Miller – Anna Moffo, Carlo Bergonzi, Shirley Verrett, Cornell MacNeil, Giorgio Tozzi, Ezio Flagello – The RCA Italiana Opera Chorus and Orchestra, Fausto Cleva - RCA Victor
- 1965 – Gluck – Orfeo ed Euridice – Shirley Verrett, Anna Moffo, Judith Raskin – Polyphonic Chorus of Rome, I Virtuosi di Roma, Renato Fasano - RCA Victor
- 1965 – Donizetti – Lucia di Lammermoor – Anna Moffo, Carlo Bergonzi, Mario Sereni, Ezio Flagello – The RCA Italiana Opera Chorus and Orchestra, Georges Prêtre - RCA Victor
- 1966 – Puccini – La Rondine – Anna Moffo, Daniele Barioni, Graziella Sciutti, Piero de Palma, Mario Sereni – The RCA Italiana Opera Chorus and Orchestra, Francesco Molinari-Pradelli - RCA Victor
- 1971 - Songs of Debussy - Jean Casadesus, piano - RCA Red Seal
- 1972 – Anna Moffo sings Bellini, Donizetti, Rossini & Verdi - Giorgio Favaretto, piano – Westminster Gold
- 1974 – Halevy – La Juive (Highlights) – Richard Tucker, Martina Arroyo, Anna Moffo, Juan Sabate, Bonaldo Giaiotti – Ambrosian Opera Chorus, New Philharmonia Orchestra, Antonio de Almeida - RCA Red Seal
- 1974 – Massenet – Thaïs – Anna Moffo, José Carreras, Gabriel Bacquier, Justino Díaz – Ambrosian Opera Chorus, New Philharmonia Orchestra, Julius Rudel – RCA Red Seal
- 1974 – Hansel & Gretel – Anna Moffo, Helen Donath, Christa Ludwig, Dietrich Fischer-Dieskau, Bavarian Radio Orchestra, Boys Choir of Tölz, Kurt Eichhorn – RCA Red Seal
- 1975 – Heroines From Great French Operas – New Philharmonia Orchestra, Peter Maag – Ambrosian Opera Chorus, John McCarthy - RCA Red Seal
- 1976 – Montemezzi – L'amore dei tre re – Anna Moffo, Plácido Domingo, Pablo Elvira, Cesare Siepi – Ambrosian Opera Chorus, London Symphony Orchestra, Nello Santi - RCA Red Seal
