= Daniele Barioni =

Italian opera singer (1930–2022)

- Daniele Barioni (photo with 1957 dedication)
- Born: 6 September 1930; Copparo, Italy
- Died: 5 November 2022 (aged 92); Ferrara, Italy
- Occupation: Opera singer (tenor)
- Years active: 1954–1981
- Spouse: Vera Franceschi (m. 1957; died 1966)
- Children: 1

Daniele Barioni (6 September 1930 – 5 November 2022) was an Italian opera singer who had a prolific career during the 1950s through the 1970s. Early on in his career he rose to fame as a leading tenor at the Metropolitan Opera between 1956 and 1962. Afterwards he worked primarily in opera houses and concerts throughout the United States, although he did make numerous appearances in both Europe and South America as well. Barioni was particularly associated with the operas of Giacomo Puccini and the roles of Turiddu in Pietro Mascagni's Cavalleria rusticana and Alfredo in Giuseppe Verdi's La traviata.

== Training and early career ==
Barioni was born in Copparo, Ferrara. He began his singing studies in 1949 in Milan with Attilio Bordonali, initially studying the baritone repertoire. He made his professional singing debut that same year at the Circolo Italia, in Milan, in a concert with the Chilean soprano Claudia Parada. Not too long after, his teacher became convinced he was actually a tenor and began training Barioni in the tenor repertoire for the next five years. His operatic debut was in 1954 as Turiddu in Cavalleria rusticana at the Teatro Nuovo, in Milan. During the first year of his career he also sang Mario Cavaradossi in Tosca and Pinkerton in Madame Butterfly. In 1955 he sang on tour throughout Egypt and South Africa.

== Career at the Metropolitan Opera ==
In 1956 Barioni came to the United States to join the roster at the Metropolitan Opera in New York City where he sang for seven seasons for a total of 54 performances. During his tenure at the Met, Barioni sang opposite some of the world's finest sopranos including Lucine Amara, Maria Callas, Mary Curtis Verna, Victoria de los Ángeles, Dorothy Kirsten, Zinka Milanov, Leonie Rysanek, Giulietta Simionato, Antonietta Stella, Anna Moffo and Renata Tebaldi among others. He made his debut with the company on 20 February 1956 as Mario Cavaradossi in Tosca with Delia Rigal in the title role and George London as Scarpia. Just two days later he sang his first Rodolfo in Puccini's La bohème opposite Licia Albanese, his most frequent leading lady at the Met, as Mimì.

During his second Met season, Barioni portrayed Pinkerton in Madame Butterfly and Alfredo in Verdi's La traviata in addition to singing Rodolfo and Cavaradossi, and Turridu. His portrayal of Turridu was so popular that the company decided to take the production on tour throughout different cities in the United States and Canada during the 1958-1959 season. Barioni's other roles at the Met included Macduff in Verdi's Macbeth, Dick Johnson in Puccini's La fanciulla del West, and the title role in Umberto Giordano's Andrea Chénier. His last performance at the Met was on November 27, 1962 as the Italian Singer in Richard Strauss's Der Rosenkavalier.

== Further career ==
After 1962 Barioni did not return to the Met but sang continuously in other American cities until 1975. He began appearing with other American opera companies during his time with the Met. He was a frequent performer in the city of Philadelphia with both the Philadelphia Grand Opera Company (PGOC) and the Philadelphia Lyric Opera Company (PLOC) during the 1960s. He made his debut with the PGOC on January 18, 1959 as Rodolfo at the Academy of Music. He went on to portray several more roles with the PGOC, including: Ruggero Lastouc in La rondine (1960, 1961), Pinkerton (1965, 1967), and Alfredo (1966, 1967). He made his debut with the PLOC on December 28, 1962 as Turiddu. His other roles with the PLOC include Edgardo in Lucia di Lammermoor (1963), Pinkerton (1964), and Rodolfo (1965).

Though for many years his career was mostly developed in the United States, he sang in Italy in different cities and theaters, and also in Brazil, Mexico, Argentina, Canada, Portugal, France, Germany and Ireland. In 1958 he appeared in an Italian film, Carosello di Canzoni. Though he was a favorite in Rome where he sang for many years at the Opera and Caracalla, he sang at the famous La Scala only in 1966, as Pinkerton and Turiddu. Though his repertory was basically that of a spinto tenor and he was always asked to repeat his well-known roles in Tosca, La fanciulla del West or Cavalleria rusticana, he also obtained acclaim in Nabucco, Macbeth, Fedora, Andrea Chénier, Turandot and La Gioconda, as well as in some operas not associated with his type of voice, such as Lucia di Lammermoor and Rigoletto, or rarely performed like, Lucrezia by Respighi, La rondine by Puccini or La vida breve by de Falla. His repertory included a total of 31 different operas.

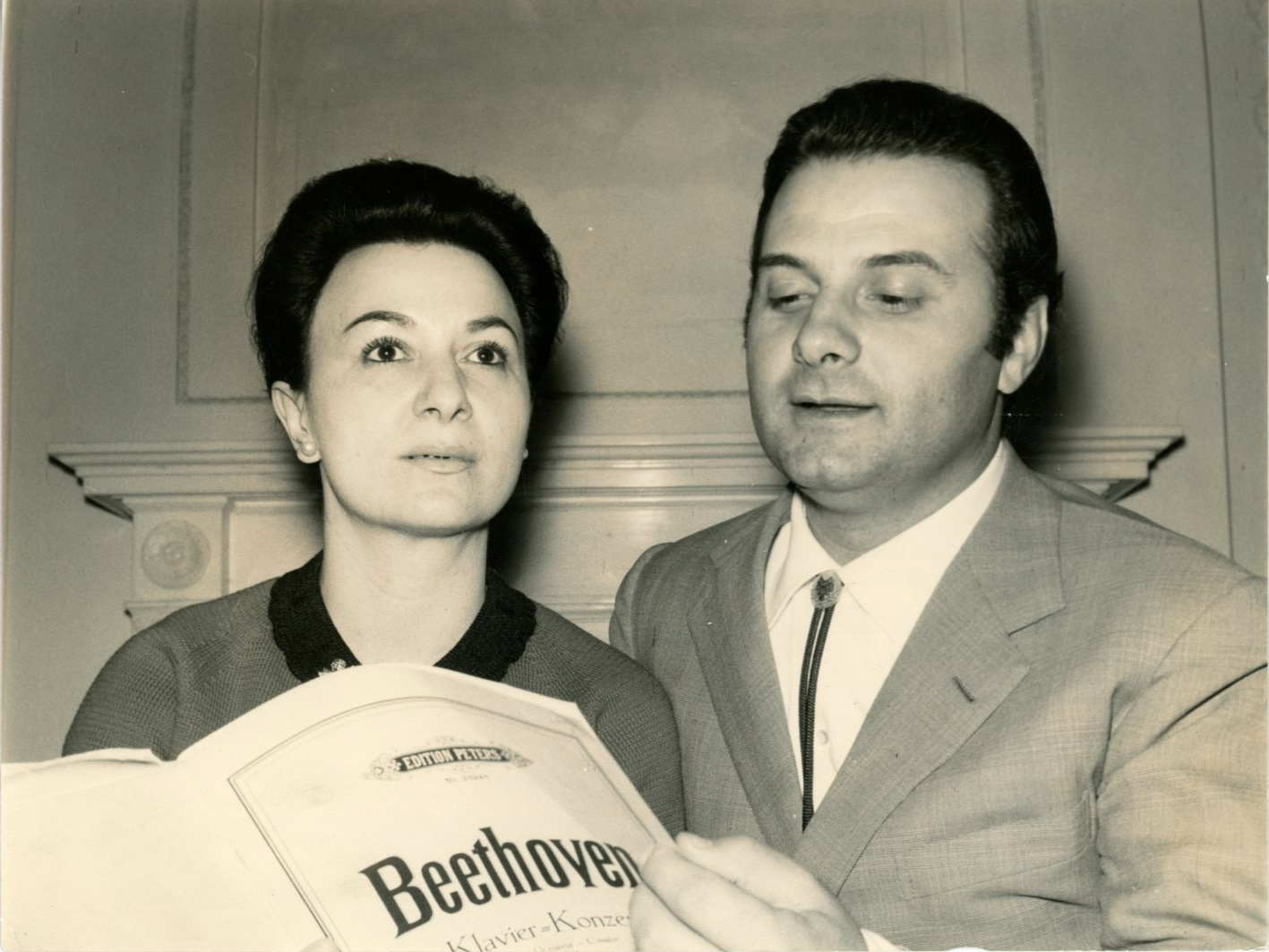
Daniele Barioni and Vera Franceschi circa 1962

Barioni married in 1957 the Italian-American pianist Vera Franceschi. In 1958 their son Giulio Barioni was born. She died prematurely of leukemia in 1966. Her death also meant the decline of Barioni's career as a singer. From 1975 to 1980 he appeared in opera and concerts, but not so often as in previous years. His last appearance was in a concert with Renata Tebaldi at the Teatro Comunale, in Ferrara, in 1981, to receive the Premio Frescobaldi 1980.

Mario del Monaco gave the following commentaries on Barioni:

- "Sei la più bella voce di tenore dei nostri giorni. Vai sicuro, che nessuno ti può fregare" (1959)
- "Per fortuna che Barioni si è defilato, altrimenti ci mandava tutti a rapanelli"

== Death ==
Barioni died on 5 November 2022, at the age of 92.

== Recordings ==
His only commercial complete opera set was La rondine with Anna Moffo (RCA-1966); he appears briefly on Leontyne Price's fourth "Prima Donna" album. Considered much better, however, are his live performances issued on several private labels which include his performance as Johnson in La Fanciulla with Tebaldi. Some years ago in Italy were issued several LPs with mostly live material:

- Omaggio a Caruso
- Davanti a lui tremó il Metropolitan
- Il tenore Daniele Barioni e Napoli

He also made some recordings for the Metropolitan Opera Record Club, available by subscription on a limited basis only.
