= Ezio Flagello =

American opera singer

Ezio Domenico Flagello (January 28, 1931 – March 19, 2009) was an Italian American opera singer who sang at the Metropolitan Opera from 1957 to 1984. He was a bass singer particularly associated with the Italian language repertory.

== Career ==
Flagello was born in New York City on January 28, 1931. He first studied at the Manhattan School of Music—where he was a pupil of Friedrich Schorr and John Brownlee—and then at the Santa Cecilia Conservatory, Rome, with Luigi Ricci.

Flagello as Verdi's Falstaff at the Metropolitan Opera

Flagello made his professional debut at the Empire State Festival, in Ellenville, New York, in 1955, as Dulcamara in L'elisir d'amore. He made his Metropolitan Opera debut at age 26 on November 9, 1957, as the Jailer in Tosca. Four days later, as a last minute replacement, he sang Leporello in Don Giovanni. He quickly became a favorite with the audience in comic roles, such as Bartolo in The Barber of Seville and Dulcamara in Elisir d'amore, though he also excelled in more lyrical and dramatic repertory. In his 27 seasons with the company, he sang, notably, Rodolfo in La sonnambula, Giorgio in I puritani, Raimondo in Lucia di Lammermoor, Silva in Ernani, Wurm in Luisa Miller, Sparafucile in Rigoletto, Fra Melitone in La forza del destino, Philippe II in Don Carlos, Pogner in Die Meistersinger von Nürnberg, Timur in Turandot, and other roles. He created the role of Enobarbus in Samuel Barber's opera Antony and Cleopatra for the opening of the new Metropolitan Opera at Lincoln Center on September 16, 1966.

Flagello possessed an upper register voice that could extend to a high A. He left an extensive discography which includes Così fan tutte, opposite Leontyne Price, Tatiana Troyanos, George Shirley, Sherrill Milnes, under Erich Leinsdorf, Lucrezia Borgia, opposite Montserrat Caballé, Alfredo Kraus, Shirley Verrett, Lucia di Lammermoor and Luisa Miller, both opposite Anna Moffo and Carlo Bergonzi, Rigoletto, opposite Robert Merrill and under Georg Solti, Ernani, Ballo in maschera, Forza del destino, all opposite Leontyne Price. He also recorded Handel's Alcina and Bellini's I Puritani, both opposite Joan Sutherland, as well as the role of Harapha in the famous Archiv recording of Handel's oratorio Samson (1968). He also left recordings of music by his brother, composer and conductor Nicolas Flagello, including as soloist in the 1974 premiere (Kennedy Center, Washington, DC, and subsequent recording of his brother's oratorio The Passion of Martin Luther King.

Flagello also enjoyed a successful international career, appearing frequently in Vienna, Milan, Berlin, London, and other places. In addition to his operatic career, he had a small role in the flashback sequences in The Godfather Part II (1974) as an impresario threatened by Don Fanucci. Ezio Flagello retired from the stage in 1987. He was the brother of composer and conductor Nicolas Flagello. He was married to Italian-American writer Anna Mione, with whom he had four children. He died at his Palm Bay, Florida, home on March 19, 2009.

== Filmography ==
Year	Title	Role	Notes
1974	The Godfather Part II	Impresario	
