= Victor de Sabata discography =

This discography aims to include all published recordings featuring the conducting of Victor de Sabata.

== Sorted by composer and work ==
=== Barber ===
Date	Composer	Work	Soloists/Choir/Orchestra	Type	Label(s)	References
18 March 1950	Barber	School for Scandal (Overture)	New York Philharmonic	Live recording, Carnegie Hall, New York	Nuova Era 2297, Archipel ARPCD 0135	

=== Beethoven ===
Date	Composer	Work	Soloists/Choir/Orchestra	Type	Label(s)	References
2–3 May 1946	Beethoven	Third Symphony (Eroica)	London Philharmonic Orchestra	Studio recording for Decca, Walthamstow Assembly Halls, London	Istituto Discografico Italiano IDIS 6361, Iron Needle IN 1410, Arkadia 105788, Grammofono 2000 78686-7	, , ,
16 March 1950	Beethoven	Fifth Symphony	New York Philharmonic	Live recording, Carnegie Hall, New York	Urania URN 22.142, Tahra TAH 449, Nuova Era 013.6316	
23–25, 29 January, 3 February 1947	Beethoven	Sixth Symphony (Pastoral)	Orchestra of Santa Cecilia	Studio recording for His Master's Voice, Teatro Argentina, Rome	Grammofono 2000 AB 78852, Naxos 8.110859, Arkadia 105788	
18 March 1951	Beethoven	Eighth Symphony	New York Philharmonic	Live recording, Carnegie Hall, New York	Nuova Era 013.6338, Istituto Discografico Italiano IDIS 6361	

=== Berlioz ===
Date	Composer	Work	Soloists/Choir/Orchestra	Type	Label(s)	References
May 1946	Berlioz	Le Carnaval Romain Overture	London Philharmonic Orchestra	Studio recording for Decca, Walthamstow Assembly Halls, London	Magic Master 37086, Iron Needle IN 1410, Grammofono 2000 78686-7	,
1 August 1953	Berlioz	Le Carnaval Romain overture	Vienna Philharmonic Orchestra	Live recording, Festspielhaus, Salzburg	Istituto Discografico Italiano IDIS 6416, Nuova Era 2319, Dynamic IDIS6416	,

=== Brahms ===
Date	Composer	Work	Soloists/Choir/Orchestra	Type	Label(s)	References
February 1953	Brahms	Third Symphony (finale) (rehearsal)	San Francisco Symphony	Live recording, San Francisco	Archiv Documents ADCD200, Nuova Era 2319	,
April 1939	Brahms	Fourth Symphony	Berlin Philharmonic Orchestra	Studio recording for Polydor, Alte Jacobstrasse Studio, Berlin	Pearl GEMS 0054, Magic Master 37086, Andante 1030, Istituto Discografico Italiano IDIS 6406/07, Grammofono 2000 78686-7	, , ,
16 March 1950	Brahms	Violin Concerto	Nathan Milstein (violin), New York Philharmonic	Live recording, Carnegie Hall, New York	Nuova Era 013.6316, Tahra TAH 449, Archipel ARPCD 0086	

=== De Sabata ===
Date	Composer	Work	Soloists/Choir/Orchestra	Type	Label(s)	References
29–30 December 1933	De Sabata	Juventus	RAI Symphony Orchestra, Turin	Studio recording for Parlophone, Turin	Naxos 8.110859	

=== Debussy ===
Date	Composer	Work	Soloists/Choir/Orchestra	Type	Label(s)	References
7 February 1947	Debussy	Jeux	Orchestra Stabile Accademia di Santa Cecilia, Roma	Studio recording for HMV, Teatro Argentina, Rome	Testament SBT 1108, Pristine Audio PASC046	,
28 February – 1 March 1948	Debussy	La Mer	Orchestra Stabile Accademia di Santa Cecilia, Roma	Studio recording for HMV (not issued until 1997), Teatro Argentina, Roma	Testament SBT 1108	
1 February 1948	Debussy	Nocturnes (Nuages)	Orchestra Stabile Accademia di Santa Cecilia, Roma	Studio recording for HMV, Teatro Argentina, Roma	Testament SBT 1108	
24 February 1948	Debussy	Nocturnes (Fetes)	Orchestra Stabile Accademia di Santa Cecilia, Roma	Studio recording for HMV, Teatro Argentina, Roma	Testament SBT 1108	

=== Dukas ===
Date	Composer	Work	Soloists/Choir/Orchestra	Type	Label(s)	References
12 March 1950	Dukas	The Sorcerer's Apprentice	New York Philharmonic	Live recording, Carnegie Hall, New York	Nuova Era 6350, Originals 821	

=== Dvořák ===
Date	Composer	Work	Soloists/Choir/Orchestra	Type	Label(s)	References
26 March 1950	Dvořak	Ninth Symphony (From the New World)	New York Philharmonic	Live recording, Carnegie Hall, New York	Istituto Discorafico Italiano IDIS 336, Nuova Era 2297	

=== Franck ===
Date	Composer	Work	Soloists/Choir/Orchestra	Type	Label(s)	References
12 March 1950	Franck	Symphony in D minor	New York Philharmonic	Live recording, Carnegie Hall, New York	Istituto Discografico Italiano IDIS 336, Nuova Era 6350	

=== Ghedini ===
Date	Composer	Work	Soloists/Choir/Orchestra	Type	Label(s)	References
5 March 1950	Ghedini	Marinaresca e baccanale	New York Philharmonic	Live recording, Carnegie Hall, New York, 3pm	Nuova Era 2219, Archipel ARPCD 0135	

=== Giordano ===
Date	Composer	Work	Soloists/Choir/Orchestra	Type	Label(s)	References
6 March 1949	Giordano	Andrea Chénier (excerpts)	Mario del Monaco (Andrea Chénier), Renata Tebaldi (Madeleine), Paolo Silveri (Gerard), Orchestra and chorus of La Scala	Live recording, Teatro alla Scala, Milan	Fono Enterprise 1058, Myto MCD 90634	,

=== Glazunov ===
Date	Composer	Work	Soloists/Choir/Orchestra	Type	Label(s)	References
28 December 1933	Glazunov	From the Middle Ages (suite)	RAI Symphony Orchestra, Turin	Studio recording for Parlophone, Turin	Naxos 8.110859	

=== Kodály ===
Date	Composer	Work	Soloists/Choir/Orchestra	Type	Label(s)	References
April 1939	Kodály	Dances of Galanta	Berlin Philharmonic Orchestra	Studio recording for Polydor, Alte Jacobstrasse Studio, Berlin	Pearl GEMS 0054, Urania 155, Istituto Discografico Italiano IDIS 6406/07, Grammofono 2000 78686-7	,

=== Mosolov ===
Date	Composer	Work	Soloists/Choir/Orchestra	Type	Label(s)	References
30 December 1933	Mosolov	Iron Foundry	RAI Symphony Orchestra, Turin	Studio recording for Parlophone, Turin	Naxos 8.110859	

=== Mozart ===
Date	Composer	Work	Soloists/Choir/Orchestra	Type	Label(s)	References
December 1941	Mozart	Requiem (complete)	Pia Tassinari (soprano), Ebe Stignani (mezzo-soprano), Ferruccio Tagliavini (tenor), Italo Tajo (bass), Orchestra e Coro di Torino dell'EIAR	Live recording, Basilica di Santa Maria degli Angeli, Rome	Iron Needle IN 1390, Cetra 40001, Naxos 8.111064	, ,

=== Puccini ===
Date	Composer	Work	Soloists/Choir/Orchestra	Type	Label(s)	References
7 December 1949	Puccini	La bohème (excerpts)	Gianni Pogi (Rodolfo), Margherita Carosio (Mimì), Paolo Silveri (Marcello), Alda Noni (Musetta), Orchestra and chorus of La Scala	Live recording, Teatro alla Scala, Milan	Myto MCD 90634	,
12 April 1953	Puccini	Tosca (Aria "Vissi d'arte")	Renata Tebaldi (soprano), Orchestra of La Scala, Milan	Live recording, Teatro alla Scala, Milan	Nuova Era 2319	,
10–14, 16, 18–21 August 1953	Puccini	Tosca (complete)	Maria Callas (Floria Tosca), Giuseppe Di Stefano (Mario Caravadossi), Tito Gobbi (Scarpia), Chorus and orchestra of La Scala	Studio recording for HMV, Teatro alla Scala, Milan	EMI 7243 5 62890 2 4 (and many others), Naxos 8.110256-57, Regis 2065	

=== Rachmaninoff ===
Date	Composer	Work	Soloists/Choir/Orchestra	Type	Label(s)	References
12 March 1950	Rachmaninoff	Rhapsody on a Theme of Paganini	Artur Rubinstein (piano), New York Philharmonic	Live recording, Carnegie Hall, New York	Aura 252, Archipel ARPCD 0135, Originals ORI 821, Nuova Era 2232	

=== Ravel ===
Date	Composer	Work	Soloists/Choir/Orchestra	Type	Label(s)	References
5 March 1950	Ravel	Boléro	New York Philharmonic	Live recording, Carnegie Hall, New York, 3pm	Nuova Era 2219, Archipel ARPCD 0135,	
26 March 1950	Ravel	Ma Mère l'Oie (suite)	New York Philharmonic	Live recording, Carnegie Hall, New York	Archipel ARPCD 0135, Originals 821, Nuova Era 2219	
1 August 1953	Ravel	La Valse	Vienna Philharmonic Orchestra	Live recording, Festspielhaus, Salzburg	Istituto Discografico Italiano IDIS 6416, Archipel ARPCD 0135, Nuova Era 2219, Dynamic IDIS6416	

=== Respighi ===
Date	Composer	Work	Soloists/Choir/Orchestra	Type	Label(s)	References
April 1939	Respighi	Feste Romane	Berlin Philharmonic Orchestra	Studio recording for Polydor, Alte Jacobstrasse Studio, Berlin	Pearl GEMS 0054, Istituto Discografico Italiano IDIS 6406/07	,
23–24 January 1947	Respighi	Fountains of Rome	Orchestra Stabile Accademia di Santa Cecilia, Roma	Studio recording for HMV, Teatro Argentina, Rome	Testament SBT 1108, EMI References 7243 56550629, Naxos 8.111049-50	, ,
12 March 1950	Respighi	Pines of Rome	New York Philharmonic	Live recording, Carnegie Hall, New York	Urania URN 22.142, Nuova Era 2232	

=== Rossini ===
Date	Composer	Work	Soloists/Choir/Orchestra	Type	Label(s)	References
3 February 1952	Rossini	Barber of Seville (complete)	Gino Bechi (Figaro), Dora Gatta (Rosina), Cesare Valletti (Almaviva), Melchiorre Luise (Bartolo), Nicola Rossi-Lemeni (Basilio), Chorus and orchestra of La Scala	Live recording, Teatro alla Scala, Milan	Walhall WLCD 0061	
February 1953	Rossini	La gazza ladra (overture) (rehearsal)	San Francisco Symphony	Live recording, San Francisco	Archiv Documents ADCD200	
February 1948	Rossini	William Tell (overture)	Orchestra of Santa Cecilia	Studio recording for HMV	Grammofono 2000 AB 78852, EMI References 7243 56550629, Naxos 8.111049-50	,

=== Schumann ===
Date	Composer	Work	Soloists/Choir/Orchestra	Type	Label(s)	References
18 March 1951	Schumann	Piano Concerto	Claudio Arrau (piano), New York Philharmonic	Live recording, Carnegie Hall, New York	Aura 252, Music and Arts 1174, Archipel ARPCD 0086	

=== Sibelius ===
Date	Composer	Work	Soloists/Choir/Orchestra	Type	Label(s)	References
May 1946	Sibelius	En saga	London Philharmonic Orchestra	Studio recording for Decca, Walthamstow Assembly Halls, London	Decca LP 6BB 236/7	,
5 March 1950	Sibelius	First Symphony	New York Philharmonic	Live recording, Carnegie Hall, New York, 3pm	Nuova Era 2210, Urania 155	,
May 1946	Sibelius	Valse Triste	London Philharmonic Orchestra	Studio recording for Decca, Walthamstow Assembly Halls, London	Grammofono 2000 78686-7	

=== Richard Strauss ===
Date	Composer	Work	Soloists/Choir/Orchestra	Type	Label(s)	References
April 1939	Richard Strauss	Death and Transfiguration	Berlin Philharmonic Orchestra	Studio recording for Polydor, Alte Jacobstrasse Studio, Berlin	Pearl GEMS 0054, Istituto Discografico Italiano IDIS 6406/07	, ,
1 August 1953	Richard Strauss	Death and Transfiguration	Vienna Philharmonic Orchestra	Live recording, Festspielhaus, Salzburg	Istituto Discografico Italiano IDIS 6416, Nuova Era 2210, Dynamic IDIS6416, Archipel ARPCD 0135	
November/December 1948	Richard Strauss	Don Quixote	Aldo Parisot (cello), Pittsburgh Symphony Orchestra	Live recording, Pittsburgh	Urania URN 22.105	,
February 1953	Richard Strauss	Dance of the Seven Veils (from Salome) (rehearsal)	San Francisco Symphony	Live recording, San Francisco	Archiv Documents ADCD200, Nuova Era 2319, Archipel ARPCD 0135	

=== Stravinsky ===
Date	Composer	Work	Soloists/Choir/Orchestra	Type	Label(s)	References
9 September 1947	Stravinsky	Chant du Rossignol	Stockholm Philharmonic Orchestra	Live recording, Stockholm	Urania 155, Archipel ARPCD 0135, Nuova Era 2319	
28 December 1933	Stravinsky	Fireworks	RAI Symphony Orchestra, Turin	Studio recording for Parlophone, Turin	Naxos 8.110859	

=== Verdi ===
Date	Composer	Work	Soloists/Choir/Orchestra	Type	Label(s)	References
7 June 1936	Verdi	Aïda (excerpts) (sung in Swedish and German)	Jussi Björling, (Radamès), Maria Nemeth, Kerstin Thorborg, Alexander Svied, Ludwig Hofmann, Orchestra and chorus of the Vienna State Opera	Live recording, Vienna	Koch Schwann 3-1454-2 ("Edition Wiener Staatsoper Live, Volume 4")	,
22 June 1937	Verdi	Aïda (complete)	Gina Cigna (Aida), Beniamino Gigli (Radamès), Ebe Stignani (Amneris), Tancredi Pasero (Ramfis), Orchestra and chorus of La Scala	Live recording, Berlin	Eklipse EKR 53	, , ,
14 May 1938	Verdi	Aïda (excerpts)	Gina Cigna (Aïda), Beniamino Gigli, (Radamès), Orchestra and chorus of La Scala	Live recording, Teatro alla Scala	Music and Arts 1104	
April 1939	Verdi	Aïda (prelude)	Berlin Philharmonic Orchestra	Studio recording for Polydor, Alte Jacobstrasse Studio, Berlin	Istituto Discografico Italiano IDIS 6406/07	
7 June 1951	Verdi	Falstaff (complete)	Mariano Stabile (Falstaff), Renata Tebaldi, Cloë Elmo (Quickly), Chorus and orchestra of La Scala	Live recording, Teatro alla scala, Milan	Opera d'Oro 1214, Urania 176, Nuova Era 2220/21, Premiere Opera CDNO 2932	
26 May 1952	Verdi	Falstaff (complete)	Mariano Stabile (Falstaff), Renata Tebaldi (Alice), Cloë Elmo (Quickly), Orchestra and chorus of La Scala	Live recording, Teatro alla Scala, Milan	Music and Arts CD 1104, Cantus Classics 500.408	,
7 December 1952	Verdi	Macbeth (complete)	Maria Callas (Lady Macbeth), Enzo Mascherini (Macbeth), Italo Tajo (Banquo), Orchestra and Chorus of La Scala	Live recording, Teatro alla Scala, Milan	Nuova Era 2202/3, EMI CMS 5 66447 2, Hunt 2CDSLMH 34027, Legendary LR-CD-1003-2, Movimento Musica 051.022, Arkadia CDMP 427.2, G.O.P. 750-CD2, Canale 539003/4, Documents 221886-303	,
1 February 1938	Verdi	Otello (excerpts)	Maria Caniglia (Soprano), Francesco Merli (Tenor), Piero Biasini (Baritone), Orchestra and chorus of La Scala	Live recording, Teatro alla Scala	Music and Arts 1104	
5 February 1949	Verdi	Otello (aria "Willow Song")	Renata Tebaldi, Orchestra and chorus of La Scala	Live recording, Teatro alla Scala, Milan	Fono Enterprise 1058	
12 December 1940	Verdi	Requiem (excerpts)	Beniamino Gigli (Tenor), Ebe Stignani (Mezzo-soprano), Maria Caniglia (Soprano), Tancredi Pasero (Bass), RAI Chorus and Orchestra	Live recording	Enterprise RY 77	,
14 December 1940	Verdi	Requiem (excerpts)	Beniamino Gigli (Tenor), Ebe Stignani (Mezzo-soprano), Maria Caniglia (Soprano), Tancredi Pasero (Bass), EIAR Symphony Orchestra and Chorus, Orchestra da Camera di Roma	Live recording, Basilica di Santa Maria degli Angeli, Rome	Legato LCD 178-2, Arkadia CDMP 446	, ,
27 January 1951	Verdi	Requiem (complete)	Renata Tebaldi (soprano), Nell Rankin (mezzo-soprano), Giacinto Prandelli (tenor), Nicola Rossi-Lemeni (bass), Chorus and orchestra of La Scala	Live recording, Teatro alla Scala, Milan	Nuova Era 6346/47, Urania URN 22.189, Great Opera Performances GOP 825	
18–22, 25–27 June 1954	Verdi	Requiem (complete)	Elisabeth Schwarzkopf (soprano), Oralia Dominguez (mezzo-soprano), Giuseppe di Stefano (tenor), Cesare Siepi (bass), Chorus and orchestra of La Scala	Studio recording for HMV, Teatro alla Scala, Milan	EMI 653565 5062, EMI References 7243 56550629, Naxos 8.111049-50, Opera d'Oro OPD 1314	, ,
February – March 1948	Verdi	La traviata (Act 1 and Act 3 Preludes)	Orchestra of Santa Cecilia	Studio recording for HMV	Grammofono 2000 AB 78852, EMI References 7243 56550629, Naxos 8.111049-50	,
February 1947	Verdi	I vespri siciliani (Overture)	Orchestra of Santa Cecilia	Studio recording for HMV	Grammofono 2000 AB 78852, Malibran CDRG 174, EMI References 7243 56550629, Naxos 8.111049-50	, ,
1 August 1953	Verdi	I vespri siciliani (overture)	Vienna Philharmonic Orchestra	Live recording, Festspielhaus, Salzburg	Istituto Discografico Italiano IDIS 6416, Nuova Era 2319, Originals ORI 821, Dynamic IDIS6416	,

=== Wagner ===
Date	Composer	Work	Soloists/Choir/Orchestra	Type	Label(s)	References
25 March 1951	Wagner	Götterdämmerung (immolation scene)	Eileen Farrell (soprano), New York Philharmonic	Live recording, Carnegie Hall, New York	Nuova Era 013.6637, Arkadia/Hunt 512, Arkadia CDHP 512.1, Urania 22167	
25 March 1951	Wagner	Die Meistersinger (prelude)	New York Philharmonic	Live recording, Carnegie Hall, New York	Nuova Era 013.6637, Arkadia/Hunt 512, Arkadia CDHP 512.1, Urania 22167	
25 March 1951	Wagner	Parsifal (Prelude and Good Friday music)	New York Philharmonic	Live recording, Carnegie Hall, New York	Nuova Era 013.6637, Arkadia/Hunt 512, Arkadia CDHP 512.1, Urania 22167	
11 December 1930	Wagner	Tristan und Isolde (excerpts) (sung in Italian)	Giuseppina Cobelli (Isolde), Renato Zanelli (Tristan), Orchestra of La Scala	Live recording, Teatro alla Scala, Milan	Pearl GEMS 0054, Symposium 1102	,
April 1939	Wagner	Tristan und Isolde: Prelude and Liebestod	Berlin Philharmonic Orchestra	Studio recording for Polydor, Alte Jacobstrasse Studio, Berlin	Pearl GEMS 0054, Uhttp://worldcat.org/search?q=victor+de+sabata&qt=owc_searchrania 155, Magic Master 37086, Iron Needle IN 1410, Istituto Discografico Italiano IDIS 6406/07, Grammofono 2000 78686-7	, , ,
14 April 1948	Wagner	Tristan und Isolde (excerpts)	Kirsten Flagstad (Isolde), Max Lorenz (Tristan), Rosette Anday (Brangäne) Paul Schöffler (King Mark), Orchestra and chorus of La Scala (Note: Urania booklet notes falsely claim the performance to be from 1947 with Einar Beyron as Tristan and Elsa Calveti as Brangäne)	Live recording, Teatro alla Scala, Milan	Urania URN 22.105, Simax 1820	,
25 March 1951	Wagner	Tristan und Isolde (prelude and liebestod)	Eileen Farrell (soprano), New York Philharmonic	Live recording, Carnegie Hall, New York	Nuova Era 013.6637, Arkadia/Hunt 512, Arkadia CDHP 512.1, Urania 22167	
13 December 1951	Wagner	Tristan und Isolde (complete)	Gertrud Grob-Prandl (Isolde), Max Lorenz (Tristan), Chorus and orchestra of La Scala	Live recording, Teatro alla Scala, Milan	Archipel ARPCD 0027-3	,
May 1946	Wagner	Ride of the Valkyries	London Philharmonic Orchestra	Studio recording for Decca, Walthamstow Assembly Halls, London	Magic Master 37086, Iron Needle IN 1410, Grammofono 2000 78686-7	,
February 1953	Wagner	Ride of the Valkyries (rehearsal)	San Francisco Symphony	Live recording, San Francisco	Archiv Documents ADCD200	

=== Wolf-Ferrari ===
Date	Composer	Work	Soloists/Choir/Orchestra	Type	Label(s)	References
February – March 1948	Wolf-Ferrari	I quattro rusteghi (Intermezzo from Act II)	Orchestra of Santa Cecilia	Studio recording for HMV	EMI References 7243 56550629, Naxos 8.111049-50	,
February – March 1948	Wolf-Ferrari	Il segreto di Susanna (overture from Act I)	Orchestra of Santa Cecilia	Studio recording for HMV	EMI References 7243 56550629, Naxos 8.111049-50	,

== Sorted by date ==
=== 1930s ===
==== 1930 ====
Date	Composer	Work	Soloists/Choir/Orchestra	Type	Label(s)	References
11 December 1930	Wagner	Tristan und Isolde (excerpts) (sung in Italian)	Giuseppina Cobelli (Isolde), Renato Zanelli (Tristan), Orchestra of La Scala	Live recording, Teatro alla Scala, Milan	Pearl GEMS 0054, Symposium 1102	,

==== 1933 ====
Date	Composer	Work	Soloists/Choir/Orchestra	Type	Label(s)	References
28 December 1933	Stravinsky	Fireworks	RAI Symphony Orchestra, Turin	Studio recording for Parlophone, Turin	Naxos 8.110859	
28 December 1933	Glazunov	From the Middle Ages (suite)	RAI Symphony Orchestra, Turin	Studio recording for Parlophone, Turin	Naxos 8.110859	
29–30 December 1933	De Sabata	Juventus	RAI Symphony Orchestra, Turin	Studio recording for Parlophone, Turin	Naxos 8.110859	
30 December 1933	Mosolov	Iron Foundry	RAI Symphony Orchestra, Turin	Studio recording for Parlophone, Turin	Naxos 8.110859	

==== 1936 ====
Date	Composer	Work	Soloists/Choir/Orchestra	Type	Label(s)	References
7 June 1936	Verdi	Aida (excerpts) (sung in Swedish and German)	Jussi Björling, (Radamès), Maria Nemeth, Kerstin Thorborg, Alexander Svied, Ludwig Hofmann, Orchestra and chorus of the Vienna State Opera	Live recording, Vienna	Koch Schwann 3-1454-2 ("Edition Wiener Staatsoper Live, Volume 4")	,

==== 1937 ====
Date	Composer	Work	Soloists/Choir/Orchestra	Type	Label(s)	References
22 June 1937	Verdi	Aida	Gina Cigna (Aida), Beniamino Gigli, (Radamès), Orchestra and chorus of La Scala	Live recording, Berlin	Eklipse EKR 53	, , ,

==== 1938 ====
Date	Composer	Work	Soloists/Choir/Orchestra	Type	Label(s)	References
1 February 1938	Verdi	Otello (excerpts)	Maria Caniglia (Soprano), Francesco Merli (Tenor), Piero Biasini (Baritone), Orchestra and chorus of La Scala	Live recording, Teatro alla Scala	Music and Arts 1104	
14 May 1938	Verdi	Aïda (excerpts)	Gina Cigna (Aïda), Beniamino Gigli, (Radamès), Orchestra and chorus of La Scala	Live recording, Teatro alla Scala	Music and Arts 1104	

==== 1939 ====
Date	Composer	Work	Soloists/Choir/Orchestra	Type	Label(s)	References
April 1939	Brahms	Fourth Symphony	Berlin Philharmonic Orchestra	Studio recording for Polydor, Alte Jacobstrasse Studio, Berlin	Pearl GEMS 0054, Magic Master 37086, Andante 1030, Istituto Discografico Italiano IDIS 6406/07, Grammofono 2000 78686-7	, , ,
April 1939	Respighi	Feste Romane	Berlin Philharmonic Orchestra	Studio recording for Polydor, Alte Jacobstrasse Studio, Berlin	Pearl GEMS 0054, Istituto Discografico Italiano IDIS 6406/07	,
April 1939	Wagner	Tristan und Isolde: Prelude and Liebestod	Berlin Philharmonic Orchestra	Studio recording for Polydor, Alte Jacobstrasse Studio, Berlin	Pearl GEMS 0054, Uhttp://worldcat.org/search?q=victor+de+sabata&qt=owc_searchrania 155, Magic Master 37086, Iron Needle IN 1410, Istituto Discografico Italiano IDIS 6406/07, Grammofono 2000 78686-7	, , ,
April 1939	Kodály	Dances of Galanta	Berlin Philharmonic Orchestra	Studio recording for Polydor, Alte Jacobstrasse Studio, Berlin	Pearl GEMS 0054, Urania 155, Istituto Discografico Italiano IDIS 6406/07, Grammofono 2000 78686-7	,
April 1939	Richard Strauss	Death and Transfiguration	Berlin Philharmonic Orchestra	Studio recording for Polydor, Alte Jacobstrasse Studio, Berlin	Pearl GEMS 0054, Istituto Discografico Italiano IDIS 6406/07	, ,
April 1939	Verdi	Aïda (prelude)	Berlin Philharmonic Orchestra	Studio recording for Polydor, Alte Jacobstrasse Studio, Berlin	Istituto Discografico Italiano IDIS 6406/07	

=== 1940s ===
==== 1940 ====
Date	Composer	Work	Soloists/Choir/Orchestra	Type	Label(s)	References
12 December 1940	Verdi	Requiem (excerpts)	Beniamino Gigli (Tenor), Ebe Stignani (Mezzo-soprano), Maria Caniglia (Soprano), Tancredi Pasero (Bass), RAI Chorus and Orchestra	Live recording	Enterprise RY 77	,
14 December 1940	Verdi	Requiem (excerpts)	Beniamino Gigli (Tenor), Ebe Stignani (Mezzo-soprano), Maria Caniglia (Soprano), Tancredi Pasero (Bass), EIAR Symphony Orchestra and Chorus, Orchestra da Camera di Roma	Live recording, Basilica di Santa Maria degli Angeli, Rome	Legato LCD 178-2, Arkadia CDMP 446	, ,

==== 1941 ====
Date	Composer	Work	Soloists/Choir/Orchestra	Type	Label(s)	References
December 1941	Mozart	Requiem	Pia Tassinari (soprano), Ebe Stignani (mezzo-soprano), Ferruccio Tagliavini (tenor), Italo Tajo (bass), Orchestra e Coro di Torino dell'EIAR	Live recording, Basilica di Santa Maria degli Angeli, Rome	Iron Needle IN 1390, Cetra 40001, Naxos 8.111064	, ,

==== 1946 ====
Date	Composer	Work	Soloists/Choir/Orchestra	Type	Label(s)	References
2–3 May 1946	Beethoven	Third Symphony (Eroica)	London Philharmonic Orchestra	Studio recording for Decca, Walthamstow Assembly Halls, London	Istituto Discografico Italiano IDIS 6361, Iron Needle IN 1410, Arkadia 105788, Grammofono 2000 78686-7	, , ,
May 1946	Berlioz	Le Carnaval Romain Overture	London Philharmonic Orchestra	Studio recording for Decca, Walthamstow Assembly Halls, London	Magic Master 37086, Iron Needle IN 1410, Grammofono 2000 78686-7	,
May 1946	Wagner	Ride of the Valkyries	London Philharmonic Orchestra	Studio recording for Decca, Walthamstow Assembly Halls, London	Magic Master 37086, Iron Needle IN 1410, Grammofono 2000 78686-7	,
May 1946	Sibelius	Valse Triste	London Philharmonic Orchestra	Studio recording for Decca, Walthamstow Assembly Halls, London	Grammofono 2000 78686-7	
May 1946	Sibelius	En Saga	London Philharmonic Orchestra	Studio recording for Decca, Walthamstow Assembly Halls, London	Decca LP 6BB 236/7	,

==== 1947 ====
Date	Composer	Work	Soloists/Choir/Orchestra	Type	Label(s)	References
23–24 January 1947	Respighi	Fountains of Rome	Orchestra Stabile Accademia di Santa Cecilia, Roma	Studio recording for HMV, Teatro Argentina, Rome	Testament SBT 1108, EMI References 7243 56550629, Naxos 8.111049-50	, ,
23–25, 29 January, 3 February 1947	Beethoven	Sixth Symphony (Pastoral)	Orchestra of Santa Cecilia	Studio recording for HMV, Teatro Argentina, Rome	Grammofono 2000 AB 78852, Naxos 8.110859, Arkadia 105788	
7 February 1947	Debussy	Jeux	Orchestra Stabile Accademia di Santa Cecilia, Roma	Studio recording for HMV, Teatro Argentina, Rome	Testament SBT 1108, Pristine Audio PASC046	,
February 1947	Verdi	I vespri siciliani (Overture)	Orchestra of Santa Cecilia	Studio recording for HMV	Grammofono 2000 AB 78852, Malibran CDRG 174, EMI References 7243 56550629, Naxos 8.111049-50	, ,
9 September 1947	Stravinsky	Chant du Rossignol	Stockholm Philharmonic Orchestra	Live recording, Stockholm	Urania 155, Archipel ARPCD 0135, Nuova Era 2319	

==== 1948 ====
Date	Composer	Work	Soloists/Choir/Orchestra	Type	Label(s)	References
1 February 1948	Debussy	Nocturnes (Nuages)	Orchestra Stabile Accademia di Santa Cecilia, Roma	Studio recording for HMV, Teatro Argentina, Roma	Testament SBT 1108	
24 February 1948	Debussy	Nocturnes (Fetes)	Orchestra Stabile Accademia di Santa Cecilia, Roma	Studio recording for HMV, Teatro Argentina, Roma	Testament SBT 1108	
28 February – 1 March 1948	Debussy	La Mer	Orchestra Stabile Accademia di Santa Cecilia, Roma	Studio recording for HMV (not issued until 1997), Teatro Argentina, Roma	Testament SBT 1108	
February 1948	Rossini	William Tell (overture)	Orchestra of Santa Cecilia	Studio recording for HMV	Grammofono 2000 AB 78852, EMI References 7243 56550629, Naxos 8.111049-50	,
February – March 1948	Verdi	La Traviata (Act 1 and Act 3 Preludes)	Orchestra of Santa Cecilia	Studio recording for HMV	Grammofono 2000 AB 78852, EMI References 7243 56550629, Naxos 8.111049-50	,
February – March 1948	Wolf-Ferrari	I quattro rusteghi (Intermezzo from Act II)	Orchestra of Santa Cecilia	Studio recording for HMV	EMI References 7243 56550629, Naxos 8.111049-50	,
February – March 1948	Wolf-Ferrari	Il segreto di Susanna (overture from Act I)	Orchestra of Santa Cecilia	Studio recording for HMV	EMI References 7243 56550629, Naxos 8.111049-50	,
14 April 1948	Wagner	Tristan und Isolde (excerpts)	Kirsten Flagstad (Isolde), Max Lorenz (Tristan), Rosette Anday (Brangäne) Paul Schöffler (King Mark), Orchestra and chorus of La Scala (Note: Urania booklet notes falsely claim the performance to be from 1947 with Einar Beyron as Tristan and Elsa Calveti as Brangäne)	Live recording, Teatro alla Scala, Milan	Urania URN 22.105, Simax 1820	,
November/December 1948	Richard Strauss	Don Quixote	Aldo Parisot (cello), Pittsburgh Symphony Orchestra	Live recording, Pittsburgh	Urania URN 22.105	,

==== 1949 ====
Date	Composer	Work	Soloists/Choir/Orchestra	Type	Label(s)	References
5 February 1949	Verdi	Otello (aria "Willow Song")	Renata Tebaldi, Orchestra and chorus of La Scala	Live recording, Teatro alla Scala, Milan	Fono Enterprise 1058	
6 March 1949	Giordano	Andrea Chénier (excerpts)	Mario del Monaco (Andrea Chénier), Renata Tebaldi (Madeleine), Paolo Silveri (Gerard), Orchestra and chorus of La Scala	Live recording, Teatro alla Scala, Milan	Fono Enterprise 1058, Myto MCD 90634	,
7 December 1949	Puccini	La bohème (excerpts)	Gianni Pogi (Rodolfo), Margherita Carosio (Mimì), Paolo Silveri (Marcello), Alda Noni (Musetta), Orchestra and chorus of La Scala	Live recording, Teatro alla Scala, Milan	Myto MCD 90634	,

=== 1950s ===
==== 1950 ====
Date	Composer	Work	Soloists/Choir/Orchestra	Type	Label(s)	References
5 March 1950	Ghedini	Marinaresca e baccanale	New York Philharmonic	Live recording, Carnegie Hall, New York, 3pm	Nuova Era 2219, Archipel ARPCD 0135	
5 March 1950	Ravel	Boléro	New York Philharmonic	Live recording, Carnegie Hall, New York, 3pm	Nuova Era 2219, Archipel ARPCD 0135,	
5 March 1950	Sibelius	First Symphony	New York Philharmonic	Live recording, Carnegie Hall, New York, 3pm	Nuova Era 2210, Urania 155	,
12 March 1950	Dukas	The Sorcerer's Apprentice	New York Philharmonic	Live recording, Carnegie Hall, New York	Nuova Era 6350, Originals 821	
12 March 1950	Franck	Symphony in D minor	New York Philharmonic	Live recording, Carnegie Hall, New York	Istituto Discografico Italiano IDIS 336, Nuova Era 6350	
12 March 1950	Respighi	Pines of Rome	New York Philharmonic	Live recording, Carnegie Hall, New York	Urania URN 22.142, Nuova Era 2232	
16 March 1950	Beethoven	Fifth Symphony	New York Philharmonic	Live recording, Carnegie Hall, New York	Urania URN 22.142, Tahra TAH 449, Nuova Era 013.6316	
16 March 1950	Brahms	Violin Concerto	Nathan Milstein (violin), New York Philharmonic	Live recording, Carnegie Hall, New York	Nuova Era 013.6316, Tahra TAH 449, Archipel ARPCD 0086	
18 March 1950	Barber	School for Scandal (Overture)	New York Philharmonic	Live recording, Carnegie Hall, New York	Nuova Era 2297, Archipel ARPCD 0135	
26 March 1950	Rachmaninoff	Rhapsody on a Theme of Paganini	Artur Rubinstein (piano), New York Philharmonic	Live recording, Carnegie Hall, New York	Aura 252, Archipel ARPCD 0135, Originals ORI 821, Nuova Era 2232	
26 March 1950	Dvořak	Ninth Symphony (From the New World)	New York Philharmonic	Live recording, Carnegie Hall, New York	Istituto Discorafico Italiano IDIS 336, Nuova Era 2297	
26 March 1950	Ravel	Ma Mère l'Oie (suite)	New York Philharmonic	Live recording, Carnegie Hall, New York	Archipel ARPCD 0135, Originals 821, Nuova Era 2219	

==== 1951 ====
Date	Composer	Work	Soloists/Choir/Orchestra	Type	Label(s)	References
27 January 1951	Verdi	Requiem	Renata Tebaldi (soprano), Nell Rankin (mezzo-soprano), Giacinto Prandelli (tenor), Nicola Rossi-Lemeni (bass), Chorus and orchestra of La Scala	Live recording, Teatro alla Scala, Milan	Nuova Era 6346/47, Urania URN 22.189, Great Opera Performances GOP 825	
18 March 1951	Beethoven	Eighth Symphony	New York Philharmonic	Live recording, Carnegie Hall, New York	Nuova Era 013.6338, Istituto Discografico Italiano IDIS 6361	
18 March 1951	Schumann	Piano Concerto	Claudio Arrau (piano), New York Philharmonic	Live recording, Carnegie Hall, New York	Aura 252, Music and Arts 1174, Archipel ARPCD 0086	
25 March 1951	Wagner	Tristan und Isolde (prelude and liebestod), Götterdämmerung (immolation scene), Die Meistersinger (prelude), Parsifal (Prelude and Good Friday music)	Eileen Farrell (soprano), New York Philharmonic	Live recording, Carnegie Hall, New York	Nuova Era 013.6637, Arkadia/Hunt 512, Arkadia CDHP 512.1, Urania 22167	
7 June 1951	Verdi	Falstaff	Mariano Stabile (Falstaff), Renata Tebaldi, Cloë Elmo (Quickly), Chorus and orchestra of La Scala	Live recording, Teatro alla scala, Milan	Opera d'Oro 1214, Urania 176, Nuova Era 2220/21, Premiere Opera CDNO 2932	
13 December 1951	Wagner	Tristan und Isolde	Gertrud Grob-Prandl (Isolde), Max Lorenz (Tristan), Chorus and orchestra of La Scala	Live recording, Teatro alla Scala, Milan	Archipel ARPCD 0027-3	

==== 1952 ====
Date	Composer	Work	Soloists/Choir/Orchestra	Type	Label(s)	References
3 February 1952	Rossini	Barber of Seville	Gino Bechi (Figaro), Dora Gatta (Rosina), Cesare Valletti (Almaviva), Melchiorre Luise (Bartolo), Nicola Rossi-Lemeni (Basilio), Chorus and orchestra of La Scala	Live recording, Teatro alla Scala, Milan	Walhall WLCD 0061	
26 May 1952	Verdi	Falstaff	Mariano Stabile (Falstaff), Renata Tebaldi (Alice), Cloë Elmo (Quickly), Orchestra and chorus of La Scala	Live recording, Teatro alla Scala, Milan	Music and Arts CD 1104, Cantus Classics 500.408	,
7 December 1952	Verdi	Macbeth	Maria Callas (Lady Macbeth), Enzo Mascherini (Macbeth), Italo Tajo (Banquo), Orchestra and Chorus of La Scala	Live recording, Teatro alla Scala, Milan	Nuova Era 2202/3, EMI CMS 5 66447 2, Hunt 2CDSLMH 34027, Legendary LR-CD-1003-2, Movimento Musica 051.022, Arkadia CDMP 427.2, G.O.P. 750-CD2, Canale 539003/4, Documents 221886-303	,

==== 1953 ====
Date	Composer	Work	Soloists/Choir/Orchestra	Type	Label(s)	References
February 1953	Brahms	Third Symphony (finale) (rehearsal)	San Francisco Symphony	Live recording, San Francisco	Archiv Documents ADCD200, Nuova Era 2319	,
February 1953	Richard Strauss	Dance of the Seven Veils (from Salome) (rehearsal)	San Francisco Symphony	Live recording, San Francisco	Archiv Documents ADCD200, Nuova Era 2319, Archipel ARPCD 0135	
February 1953	Rossini	La gazza ladra (overture) (rehearsal)	San Francisco Symphony	Live recording, San Francisco	Archiv Documents ADCD200	
February 1953	Wagner	Ride of the Valkyries (rehearsal)	San Francisco Symphony	Live recording, San Francisco	Archiv Documents ADCD200	
12 April 1953	Puccini	Tosca (Aria Vissi d'arte)	Renata Tebaldi (soprano), Orchestra of La Scala, Milan	Live recording, Teatro alla Scala, Milan	Nuova Era 2319	,
1 August 1953	Berlioz	Le Carnaval Romain overture	Vienna Philharmonic Orchestra	Live recording, Festspielhaus, Salzburg	Istituto Discografico Italiano IDIS 6416, Nuova Era 2319, Dynamic IDIS6416	,
1 August 1953	Richard Strauss	Death and Transfiguration	Vienna Philharmonic Orchestra	Live recording, Festspielhaus, Salzburg	Istituto Discografico Italiano IDIS 6416, Nuova Era 2210, Dynamic IDIS6416, Archipel ARPCD 0135	
1 August 1953	Ravel	La valse	Vienna Philharmonic Orchestra	Live recording, Festspielhaus, Salzburg	Istituto Discografico Italiano IDIS 6416, Archipel ARPCD 0135, Nuova Era 2219, Dynamic IDIS6416	
1 August 1953	Verdi	I vespri siciliani (overture)	Vienna Philharmonic Orchestra	Live recording, Festspielhaus, Salzburg	Istituto Discografico Italiano IDIS 6416, Nuova Era 2319, Originals ORI 821, Dynamic IDIS6416	,
10-14, 16, 18–21 August 1953	Puccini	Tosca	Maria Callas (Floria Tosca), Giuseppe di Stefano (Mario Caravadossi), Tito Gobbi (Scarpia), Chorus and orchestra of La Scala	Studio recording for HMV, Teatro alla Scala, Milan	EMI 7243 5 62890 2 4 (and many others), Naxos 8.110256-57, Regis 2065	

==== 1954 ====
Date	Composer	Work	Soloists/Choir/Orchestra	Type	Label(s)	References
18–22, 25–27 June 1954	Verdi	Requiem	Elisabeth Schwarzkopf (soprano), Oralia Dominguez (mezzo-soprano), Giuseppe di Stefano (tenor), Cesare Siepi (bass), Chorus and orchestra of La Scala	Studio recording for HMV, Teatro alla Scala, Milan	EMI 653565 5062, EMI References 7243 56550629, Naxos 8.111049-50, Opera d'Oro OPD 1314	, ,
