= La forza del destino discography =

This is a partial discography of Giuseppe Verdi's opera, La forza del destino.

== 1862 original version ==
Year	Cast (Leonora, Alvaro, Carlo, Preziosilla, Fra Melitone, Padre Guardiano)	Conductor, Opera house and orchestra	Label
1981	Martina Arroyo; Kenneth Collins; Peter Glossop; Janet Coster; Derek Hammond-Stroud; Don Garrard	John Matheson; BBC Concert Orchestra; BBC chorus (recorded at Promenade Concert on 8 August)	CD: Opera Rara; Cat: ORCV 304
1995	Galina Gorchakova; Gegam Grigorian; Nikolai Putilin; Olga Borodina; Georgy Zastavny; Mikail Kit	Valery Gergiev; Mariinsky Theatre orchestra & chorus	CD: Phillips; Cat: 446 951-2
1998	Galina Gorchakova; Gegam Grigorian; Nikolai Putilin; Marianna Tarasova; Georgy Zastavny; Sergei Alexaschkin	Valery Gergiev; Mariinsky Theatre orchestra & chorus	Video DVD: Arthaus Musik; Cat: 100.078

== 1869 revised version ==
Year	Cast (Leonora, Alvaro, Carlo, Preziosilla, Fra Melitone, Padre Guardiano)	Conductor, Opera house and orchestra	Label
1941	Maria Caniglia; Galliano Masini; Carlo Tagliabue; Ebe Stignani; Saturno Meletti; Tancredi Pasero	Gino Marinuzzi; Orchestra e Coro dell'EIAR di Torino	CD: Warner-Fonit; Cat: 8573 82652-5
1953	Renata Tebaldi; Mario Del Monaco; Aldo Protti; Fedora Barbieri; Renato Capecchi; Cesare Siepi	Dimitri Mitropoulos; Teatro Comunale di Firenze Orchestra and Chorus	CD: Cetra Records
1954	Maria Callas; Richard Tucker; Carlo Tagliabue; Elena Nicolai; Renato Capecchi; Nicola Rossi-Lemeni	Tulio Serafin; Teatro alla Scala orchestra & chorus	CD: EMI; Cat: 5 56323-2
1955	Renata Tebaldi; Mario Del Monaco; Ettore Bastianini; Giulietta Simionato; Fernando Corena; Cesare Siepi	Francesco Molinari-Pradelli; Orchestra dell'Accademia Nazionale di Santa Cecilia	CD: Decca Records; Cat: 475 8681
1956	Renata Tebaldi; Giuseppe Di Stefano; Giangiacomo Guelfi; Fedora Barbieri; Melchiorre Luise; Giulio Neri	Gabriele Santini; Teatro Comunale di Firenze Orchestra and Chorus	CD: Myto Historical
1958	Renata Tebaldi; Franco Corelli; Ettore Bastianini; Oralia Domínguez; Renato Capecchi; Boris Christoff	Francesco Molinari-Pradelli; Teatro di San Carlo orchestra & chorus (recorded on 15 March)	DVD: Hardy Classic; Cat: HCA 6014
1962	Gré Brouwenstijn; Jan Peerce; John Shaw; Rena Garazioti; Renato Capecchi; Georg Littasy	Alberto Erede; Dutch National Opera orchestra & chorus (recorded on 5 July)	CD: Osteria; Cat: OS-1002
1964	Leontyne Price; Richard Tucker; Robert Merrill; Shirley Verrett; Ezio Flagello; Giorgio Tozzi	Thomas Schippers; RCA Italiana Orchestra & chorus	CD: RCA Victor; Cat: GD 87971
1966	Elena Souliotis; Carlo Menippo; Mario Sereni; Franca Mattiucci; Alfredo Mariotti; Ivo Vinco; Alessandro Maddalena; Angela Rocco	Pasquale de Angelis; Teatro di San Carlo orchestra & chorus	CD: Hardy Classic; Cat: 6005-2
1969	Martina Arroyo; Carlo Bergonzi; Piero Cappuccilli Bianca Maria Casoni; Geraint Evans; Ruggero Raimondi	Lamberto Gardelli; Royal Philharmonic Orchestra; Ambrosian Singers	CD: EMI; Cat: CMS 5 67124-2
1976	Leontyne Price; Plácido Domingo; Sherrill Milnes; Fiorenza Cossotto; Gabriel Bacquier; Bonaldo Giaiotti	James Levine; London Symphony Orchestra; John Alldis Choir	CD: RCA Red Seal; Cat: 74321 39502 2
1978	Liljana Molnar-Talajic; Veriano Luchetti; Renato Bruson; Franca Mattiucci; Walter Monachesi; Bonaldo Giaiotti	Maurizio Arena; Verona Arena orchestra & chorus	CD: Reel tape Cat: 3929
1979	Leontyne Price; Veriano Luchetti; Guillermo Sarabia; Judith Forst; Giuseppe Taddei; Martti Talvela; David Cumberland; Gwendolyn Jones	Kurt Herbert Adler; San Francisco Opera orchestra & chorus	CD: Reel Tape; Cat: 5398
1984	Leontyne Price; Giuseppe Giacomini; Leo Nucci; Isola Jones; Enrico Fissore; Bonaldo Giaiotti	James Levine; Metropolitan Opera orchestra & chorus (recorded live March 24; staged by John Dexter)	SD video: Met Opera on Demand
1985	Rosalind Plowright; José Carreras; Renato Bruson; Agnes Baltsa; Juan Pons; Paata Burchuladze	Giuseppe Sinopoli; Philharmonia Orchestra; Ambrosian Singers	CD: Deutsche Grammophon; Cat: 477 5621
1986	Mirella Freni; Plácido Domingo; Giorgio Zancanaro; Dolora Zajick; Sesto Bruscantini; Paul Plishka	Riccardo Muti; Teatro alla Scala orchestra & chorus	CD: EMI Classics; Cat: CDS 7 47485-8
1992	Andrea Gruber; Giuseppe Giacomini; Eduard Tumagian; Ildikó Komlósi; Renato Capecchi; László Polgár; Franco Federici; Piera Puglisi	Spiros Argiris; Teatro Massimo Bellini orchestra & chorus	CD: House of Opera; Cat: 690
2006	Susanna Branchini; Renzo Zulian; Marco Di Felice; Paolo Battaglia; Paolo Rumetz	Lukas Karytinos; Orchestra Filarmonia Veneta; Teatro Sociale di Rovigo chorus	DVD: Dynamic; Cat: 33512
2013	Anja Harteros; Jonas Kaufmann; Ludovic Tézier; Nadia Krasteva; Renato Girolami; Vitalij Kowaljow	Asher Fisch; Bayerische Staatsoper orchestra & chorus	DVD: Sony Classical; Cat: 88875160649
2024	Lise Davidsen Brian Jagde Igor Golovatenko Judit Kutasi Patrick Carfizzi Soloman Howard	Yannick Nézet-Séguin Metropolitan Opera orchestra & chorus (recorded live March 9; staged by Mariusz Treliński)	HD Video: Met Opera on Demand
