= Verdi Requiem discography =

Chronological list of recordings of Verdi's Requiem

This is a list of recordings of the Messa da Requiem by Giuseppe Verdi (1813–1901).

== List ==
Year	Orchestra, chorus, conductor	Soloists	Label, format: catalog no.	Notes
1929	Orchestra and Chorus of La Scala, Milan, Carlo Sabajno	Maria Luisa Fanelli, Irene Minghini-Cattaneo, Franco Lo Giudice, Ezio Pinza	His Master's Voice, 78: D1751/60; Pearl, CD: GEMMCD9374	Gramophone (October 1930); Gramophone (May 1990)
1938	BBC Symphony Orchestra and Chorus, Arturo Toscanini	Zinka Milanov, Kerstin Thorborg, Helge Rosvaenge, Nicola Moscona	Testament, CD: SBT21362	Live recording made on 27 May at Queen's Hall, London
1938	NBC Symphony Orchestra, New York Schola Cantorum Chorus, Arturo Toscanini	Zinka Milanov, Bruna Castagna, Charles Kullman, Nicola Moscona	Legato, CD: LCD-178-2; Immortal Performances, CD	Live recording made on 4 March at Carnegie Hall, New York
1939	Rome Opera Chorus and Orchestra, Tullio Serafin	Maria Caniglia, Ebe Stignani, Beniamino Gigli, Ezio Pinza	EMI, 78: DB6210/19; EMI, CD: CDH7 63341-2	Gramophone (May 1990)
1939	Royal Concertgebouw Orchestra, Toonkunst Chorus Amsterdam, Carl Schuricht	Ina Souez, Lore Fischer, Louis van Tulder, Hermann Schey	Archiphon, CD: ARC-3,2/3	Live recording made on 2 November at the Royal Concertgebouw, Amsterdam
1940	RAI Orchestra and Chorus, Victor de Sabata	Maria Caniglia, Ebe Stignani, Beniamino Gigli, Tancredi Pasero	Enterprise, CD: RY 77	Live recording made on 12 December in an abridged version
1940	Orchestra e Coro dell'Ente Italiano per le Audizioni Radiofoniche, Orchestra da camera di Roma, Victor de Sabata	Maria Caniglia, Ebe Stignani, Beniamino Gigli, Tancredi Pasero	Legato, CD: LCD-178-2; Arkadia, CD: CDMP 446	Live recording made on 14 December in an abridged version at the Basilica di Santa Maria degli Angeli, Rome
1940	NBC Symphony Orchestra, Westminster Choir, Arturo Toscanini	Zinka Milanov, Bruna Castagna, Jussi Björling, Nicola Moscona	SARL Pristine Audio	Recorded on 23 november at Carnegie Hall, New York / Chorus prepared by John Finlay Williamson
1948	NBC Symphony Orchestra, Collegiate Chorale, Arturo Toscanini	Herva Nelli, Nan Merriman, William McGrath, Norman Scott	Music & Arts, CD: CD-1219(2)	Live recording made on 26 April at Carnegie Hall, New York / Chorus prepared by Robert Shaw
1949	Wiener Philharmoniker, Wiener Singverein, Herbert von Karajan	Hilde Zadek, Margarete Klose, Helge Rosvaenge, Boris Christoff	Audite, CD: 23.415	Live recording made on 14 August at the Salzburger Festspiele, Salzburg
1951	NBC Symphony Orchestra, Robert Shaw Chorale, Arturo Toscanini	Herva Nelli, Fedora Barbieri, Giuseppe Di Stefano, Cesare Siepi	RCA Victor, LP: LM-6018 CD: 60299-2-RG	Live recording made on 27 January at Carnegie Hall, New York; Gramophone (April 1973)
1951	Orchestra and Chorus of La Scala, Milan, Victor de Sabata	Renata Tebaldi, Nell Rankin, Giacinto Prandelli, Nicola Rossi-Lemeni	Urania, CD: URN 22.189, Decca, CD: 481 1025	Live recording made on 27 January at the Teatro alla Scala, Milan
1952	Tonkuenstlerorchester und Tonkuenstlerchor, Gustav Koslik	Ilona Steingruber, Rosette Anday, Ratko Delorco, Oskar Czerwenka	Remington R-199-150/2 (Vibraton, LP: VB-K 2022)	(Abridged, re-release, 1969)
1953	RIAS Symphony Orchestra, St. Hedwig's Cathedral Choir, Ferenc Fricsay	Maria Stader, Marianna Radev, Helmut Krebs, Kim Borg	DGG, CD: 447 442-2	Studio recording made on 22–26 September at the Jesus-Christus-Kirche, Berlin
1954	Orchestra and Chorus of La Scala, Milan, Victor de Sabata	Elisabeth Schwarzkopf, Oralia Domínguez, Giuseppe Di Stefano, Cesare Siepi	EMI, CD: 653565 5062; Naxos Records, CD: 8.111049-50	Studio recording made 18–22, 25–27 June at the Teatro alla Scala, Milan
1954	Wiener Symphoniker, Wiener Singverein, Herbert von Karajan	Antonietta Stella, Oralia Domínguez, Nicolai Gedda, Giuseppe Modesti	Orfeo, CD: C 728 082 B	Live recording made on 26 November
1955	New York Philharmonic, Westminster Choir, Guido Cantelli	Herva Nelli, Claramae Turner, Richard Tucker, Jerome Hines	Archipel, CD: 521, Premiere Opera, CD: CDNO 195-1	Live recording made on 6 February
1956	Netherlands Philharmonic Orchestra & Chorus, Walter Goehr	Corry Bijster, Elisabeth Pritchard, David Garen, Leonardo Wolovsky	Guilde Internationale Du Disque, MMS 2038	Matrix / Runout (Disc Label Side 1): MMS 2038-1 Matrix / Runout (Disc Label Side 2): MMS 2038-2
1957	The Philadelphia Orchestra, unnamed chorus, Eugene Ormandy	Leontyne Price, Nan Merriman, Richard Tucker, Giorgio Tozzi	Standing Room Only, CD: SRO-842-1	Live recording made on 6 April at the Academy of Music, Philadelphia
1958	Wiener Philharmoniker, Wiener Singverein, Herbert von Karajan	Leonie Rysanek, Christa Ludwig, Giuseppe Zampieri, Cesare Siepi	EMI, CD: 5 66880 2	Live recording made on 21 August at the Salzburger Festspiele in the Felsenreitschule, Salzburg
1959	Metropolitan Opera Orchestra and Chorus, Bruno Walter	Zinka Milanov, Heidi Krall, Rosalind Elias, Carlo Bergonzi, Giorgio Tozzi	Bruno Walter Society, CD: BWS 1023	Live recording made on 29 March
1959	Rome Opera Chorus and Orchestra, Tullio Serafin	Shakeh Vartenissian, Fiorenza Cossotto, Eugenio Fernandi, Boris Christoff	EMI, LP: 153014612; Testament, CD: SBT2140	Studio recording made 17–29 August; Alan Blyth: "among the most desirable versions", Gramophone (January 1999)
1960	Moscow Philharmonic Orchestra, State Academy Chorus, Igor Markevitch	Galina Vishnevskaya, Nina Isakova, Vladimir Ivanovsky, Ivan Petrov	ICA Classics, CD: ICAC 5068	Live recording made in Moscow (venue not mentioned)
1960	Vienna Philharmonic, Wiener Singverein, Fritz Reiner	Leontyne Price, Rosalind Elias, Jussi Björling, Giorgio Tozzi	RCA Victor, LP: LDS-6091 Decca, CD: 2DL2 467119	Studio recording made 28 May – June 1960
1960	Leningrad Philharmonic Orchestra, Glinka Academic Chapelle Chorus, Alexander Melik-Pashayev	Galina Vishnevskaya, Irina Arkhipova, Vladimir Ivanovsky, Ivan Petrov	Melodiya, CD: MEL CD 10 00433	Live recording made on 12 June in the Grand Hall of Leningrad Philharmony, Saint Petersburg
1960	Philharmonia Orchestra, Philharmonia Chorus, Carlo Maria Giulini	Joan Sutherland, Fiorenza Cossotto, Luigi Ottolini, Ivo Vinco	Myto, CD: MCD00309	Live recording made on 21 August at the Usher Hall, Edinburgh
1960	RIAS Symphony Orchestra, St. Hedwig's Cathedral Choir, RIAS Kammerchor, Ferenc Fricsay	Maria Stader, Oralia Domínguez, Gabor Carelli, Ivan Sardi	DGG, CD: 439 684-2	Live recording made on 23 October in Berlin
1960	Orchestra and Chorus of the Süddeutscher Rundfunk, Stuttgarter Lehrergesangsverein, Stuttgarter Bach Chor, Hans Müller-Kray	Maria Stader, Marga Höffgen, Fritz Wunderlich, Gottlob Frick	Myto, CD: 916.48	Live recording made on 2 November in Stuttgart
1961	NDR Sinfonieorchester and NDR Chor, WDR Chorus, Hans Schmidt-Isserstedt	Stefania Woytowicz, Christa Ludwig, Nicolai Gedda, Boris Carmeli	Archipel Records, CD: ARPCD 0480	Studio recording made at the Musikhalle Hamburg
1963	Philharmonia Orchestra, Philharmonia Chorus, Carlo Maria Giulini	Amy Shuard, Anna Reynolds, Richard Lewis, David Ward	BBC Legends, CD: BBCL 40292	Live recording made on 7 August at the Royal Albert Hall; rated highest in the 2008 Gramophone Guide
1964	Philadelphia Orchestra, Westminster Choir, Eugene Ormandy	Lucine Amara, Maureen Forrester, Richard Tucker, George London	Sony, CD: SB2K 53252	Studio recording made on 14–15 May
1964	Philharmonia Orchestra, Philharmonia Chorus, Carlo Maria Giulini	Elisabeth Schwarzkopf, Christa Ludwig, Nicolai Gedda, Nicolai Ghiaurov	EMI, CD: 4783402	Studio recording made 16–21, 23–27 September 1963 and 7 April 1964
1964	Philharmonia Orchestra, Philharmonia Chorus, Carlo Maria Giulini	Ilva Ligabue, Grace Bumbry, Sándor Kónya, Raffaele Arié	BBC Legends, CD: BBCL 4144-2	Live, 26 April 1964, Royal Festival Hall.
1964	Boston Symphony Orchestra, Boston Pro Musica Chorus, Erich Leinsdorf	Birgit Nilsson, Lili Chookasian, Carlo Bergonzi, Ezio Flagello	RCA Victor, LP: LSC-7040 CD: 09026 63747-2	Studio recording made 5–6 October at the Symphony Hall, Boston
1965	Suisse Romande Orchestra, Brassus Choir, Choir of the Grand Theater of Geneva, Ernest Ansermet	Régine Crespin, Rita Gorr, Mario Del Monaco, Tom Krause	Decca, CD: 409 932-2 DH2	Studio recording made 21–22 February at the Grand Théâtre, Geneva
1967	Orchestra and Chorus of La Scala, Milan, Herbert von Karajan	Leontyne Price, Fiorenza Cossotto, Luciano Pavarotti, Nicolai Ghiaurov	DGG, DVD: 073 4055GH	Telecast in January
1967	Vienna Philharmonic, Vienna State Opera Chorus, Georg Solti	Joan Sutherland, Marilyn Horne, Luciano Pavarotti, Martti Talvela	Decca, CD: 411 944-2 DH2	Studio recording made in October at the Sofiensaal, Vienna
1967	Los Angeles Philharmonic Orchestra Chorus, Zubin Mehta	Gwyneth Jones, Grace Bumbry, Franco Corelli, Ezio Flagello	Myto Records, CD: 2MCD013.245	Live Recording made in Los Angeles on 14 November 1967
1968	Cleveland Orchestra and Chorus, George Szell	Gabriella Tucci, Janet Baker, Pierre Duval, Martti Talvela	Golden Melodram, CD: GM 4.0067	Live recording made on 5 February at Carnegie Hall in New York City.
1969	Munich Philharmonic, Münchener Bach-Chor, Philharmonischer Chor München, Karl Richter	Ingrid Bjoner, Hertha Töpper, Waldemar Kmentt, Gottlob Frick	Altus, CD: ALT 156/7	Live recording made on 2 February in the Congress Hall of the Deutsches Museum, Munich.
1969	New Philharmonia Orchestra, New Philharmonia Chorus, John Barbirolli	Montserrat Caballé, Fiorenza Cossotto, Jon Vickers, Ruggero Raimondi	EMI, CD: CZS 7628922	Studio recording made on 18 and 30 August 1969 and 25 January 1970 at Watford Town Hall, Watford
1970	London Symphony Orchestra, London Symphony Chorus, Leonard Bernstein	Martina Arroyo, Josephine Veasey, Plácido Domingo, Ruggero Raimondi	CBS, CD: 77231	Studio recording made 23, 24, 26 February at the Royal Albert Hall Gramophone (September 1989)
1970	RAI Symphony Orchestra of Rome, RAI Chorus of Rome, RAI Chorus of Milan, Claudio Abbado	Renata Scotto, Marilyn Horne, Luciano Pavarotti, Nicolai Ghiaurov	Opera d'oro, CD: OPD-1352	Live (radio) recording made on 10 October in the Basilica of Santa Maria sopra Minerva, Rome
1970	Nordwestdeutsche Philharmonie, Chor der Städtische Musikverein Gütersloh, Matthias Büchel	Herrat Eicker, Hedwig Schubert, William Johns, Karl Ridderbusch	Eurodisc, LP: 61 770 (Club-Sonderauflage)	Live recording made on 18 November in the Rudolf-Oetker-Halle at Bielefeld, Germany
1970	Residentie Orchestra, Nederlandse Omroep Stichting Chorus; Willem van Otterloo	Martina Arroyo; Carol Smith; Alexander Young; Martti Talvela	Claves Records, CD: CD 50-9911	Live recording made on 11 and 12 December in The Hague (venue not mentioned)
1972	Berlin Philharmonic, Wiener Singverein, Herbert von Karajan	Mirella Freni, Christa Ludwig, Carlo Cossutta, Nicolai Ghiaurov	DGG, CD: 437 473	Studio recording made in January
1973	New Orleans Philharmonic-Symphony Orchestra, Werner Torkanowsky	Johanna Meier, Beverly Wolff, Nicholas di Virgilio, Norman Treigle	Opera Depot, CD: OD 11984-2	Live recording made on 9 January at the Theatre of the Performing Arts, New Orleans
1975	Orchestre philharmonique de Strasbourg, Slovak Philharmonic Choir, Alain Lombard	Joyce Barker, Mignon Dunn, Ermanno Mauro, Paul Plishka	Erato, CD: 0630-18967-2	Studio recording made in June at the Palais des Fêtes, Strasbourg, France
1977	Chicago Symphony Orchestra, Chicago Symphony Chorus, Georg Solti	Leontyne Price, Janet Baker, Veriano Luchetti, José van Dam	RCA Victor, LP: ARL2-2476 CD: 61403-2-	Studio recording made 1–2 June; Grammy Award Winner
1979	HRT Symphony Orchestra, Academic Choir Ivan Goran Kovačić, Lovro von Matačić	Margaret Price, Ruža Pospiš-Baldani, Nicolai Gedda, Luigi Roni	Premiere Opera, CD: CDNO 6292	Live recording made on 13 July at the Dubrovnik Summer Festival (Dominican Church)
1979	Philharmonia Orchestra, Ambrosian Opera Chorus, Riccardo Muti	Renata Scotto, Agnes Baltsa, Veriano Luchetti, Yevgeny Nesterenko	EMI	Studio recording made at the Kingsway Hall, London
1979	Warsaw Philharmonic Orchestra and Choir, Kazimierz Kord	Teresa Żylis-Gara, Krystina Szostek-Radkowa, Wiesław Ochman, Leonard Andrzej Mróz	A Night At the Opera, CD: ANATO 012	Type, date and location of recording not mentioned
1980	Orchestra and Chorus of La Scala, Milan, Claudio Abbado	Katia Ricciarelli, Shirley Verrett, Plácido Domingo, Nicolai Ghiaurov	DGG, CD: 415 976-2 GH2	Studio recording made in February 1980 at the Centro Telecinematografico Culturale, Milan
1980	Philadelphia Orchestra, Mendelssohn Club of Philadelphia, Riccardo Muti	Katia Ricciarelli, Florence Quivar, Veriano Luchetti, Simon Estes	WFLN, LP POA 101 (uncommercial)	Live recording made on 14 April at the Cathedral Basilica of Saints Peter and Paul, Philadelphia
1980	ORF Symphony Orchestra, ORF Choir, Leif Segerstam	Júlia Várady, Alexandrina Milczewa, Alberto Cupido, Nicola Ghiuselev	ORF, LP (uncommercial)	Live recording made on 3 October at the church of the Herzogenburg Monastery
1980	New York Philharmonic, Musica Sacra Chorus, Zubin Mehta	Montserrat Caballé, Bianca Berini, Plácido Domingo, Paul Plishka	Sony Masterworks, CD: 88765456722	Live recording made on 24, 25 and 27 October in the Avery Fisher Hall, New York City Gramophone (January 1982)
1982	Metropolitan Opera Orchestra and Chorus, James Levine	Leontyne Price, Florence Quivar, Plácido Domingo, John Cheek	Metropolitan Opera; CD	Live recording made on 20 February (released in 2010)
1983	London Philharmonic Orchestra, London Philharmonic Choir, Jesús López-Cobos	Margaret Price, Livia Budai, Giuseppe Giacomini, Robert Lloyd	LPO/BBC, CD: LPO-0048	Live recording made on 24 April at the Royal Festival Hall, London
1984	Vienna Philharmonic, Vienna State Opera Chorus, Sofia National Opera Chorus, Herbert von Karajan	Anna Tomowa-Sintow, Agnes Baltsa, José Carreras, José van Dam	DGG, CD: 439 0332	Studio recording made in June at the Musikverein, Vienna
1987	Atlanta Symphony Orchestra & Chorus, Robert Shaw	Susan Dunn, Diane Curry, Jerry Hadley, Paul Plishka	Telarc, CD: 80152	Studio recording made in April at the Symphony Hall, Atlanta
1987	Orchestra e Coro del Teatro alla Scala, Milano, Riccardo Muti	Cheryl Studer, Dolora Zajick, Luciano Pavarotti, Samuel Ramey	EMI, CD: CDS 7 49390 2	Live recording made on 26 and 29 June at the Teatro alla Scala, Milan
1988	Saarbrücken Radio Symphony Orchestra, Münchener Bach-Chor, Frankfurt Singing Academy, Hanns-Martin Schneidt	Sharon Sweet, Jard van Nes, Francisco Araiza, Simon Estes	Arte Nova Classics, CD: 74321 35799 2	Live recording made on 30 October at the Philharmonie am Gasteig, Munich
1989	Berlin Philharmonic, Ernst-Senff Choir, Carlo Maria Giulini	Sharon Sweet, Florence Quivar, Vinson Cole, Simon Estes	DGG, CD: 477 7584 GGP2	Studio recording made in April at the Jesus-Christus-Kirche, Berlin
1989	Orchestra e Coro del Teatro alla Scala, Milano, Riccardo Muti	Ljuba Kazarnovskaya, Luciana d'Intino, Fernando de la Mora, Paul Plishka	Artistotipia, CD: AL 105/106 LE	Live recording made on 18 October in the Grand Hall of the Moscow Conservatory
1990	Moscow Philharmonic Orchestra, World Festival Choir, Lorin Maazel	Sharon Sweet, Dolora Zajick, Luciano Pavarotti, Paul Plishka	Multigram, DVD	Live recording made in August at the Verona Arena
1991	Bavarian Radio Symphony Orchestra, Bavarian Radio Choir, Sir Colin Davis	Carol Vaness, Florence Quivar, Dennis O'Neill, Carlo Colombara	RCA Victor Red Seal, CD: 60902-2	Studio recording made on 7–10 October at the Herkulessaal der Residenz, Munich
1991	Vienna Philharmonic, Vienna State Opera Chorus, Claudio Abbado	Cheryl Studer, Marjana Lipovšek, José Carreras, Ruggero Raimondi	DGG, CD: 435 884-2	Studio recording made on 11 October
1992	Orchestre Révolutionnaire et Romantique, Monteverdi Choir, John Eliot Gardiner	Ľuba Orgonášová, Anne Sofie von Otter, Luca Canonici, Alastair Miles	Philips, CD: 442 1422	Live recording made in December on period instruments at All Hallows Church, London
1993	Munich Philharmonic, Munich Philharmonic Choir; Sergiu Celibidache	Elena Filipova, Reinhild Runkel, Peter Dvorský, Kurt Rydl	EMI, CD: 7243 5 57848 2 7	Live recording made on 27 and 30 November at the Philharmonie am Gasteig, Munich
1994	Stuttgart Radio Symphony Orchestra, NDR Chor, Südfunk-Chor Stuttgart, Gianluigi Gelmetti	Daniela Dessì, Gloria Scalchi, Chris Merritt, Roberto Scandiuzzi	Serenissima, CD: C 360.155-56	Live recording made at the Kaiserdom zu Speyer, Speyer
1994	Royal Philharmonic Orchestra, Brighton Festival Chorus, Royal Choral Society, Owain Arwel Hughes	Elizabeth Connell, Ameral Gunson, Edmund Burham, John Tomlinson	EMI, CD: HMVD 5 72773 2	Live recording made on 1 March at St Paul's Cathedral, London
1994	Chicago Symphony Orchestra, Chicago Symphony Chorus, Daniel Barenboim	Alessandra Marc, Waltraud Meier, Plácido Domingo, Ferruccio Furlanetto	Warner, CD: Apex 2564 67716-8	Studio recording made in September at the Orchestra Hall, Chicago
1995	London Symphony Orchestra, London Symphony Chorus, Richard Hickox	Michèle Crider, Markella Hatziano, Gabriel Sadé, Robert Lloyd	Chandos, CD: CHAN 9490	Studio recording made in July at the All Saints' Church, Tooting
1996	Orchestre national du Capitole de Toulouse, Orfeón Donostiarra, Michel Plasson	Júlia Várady, Felicity Palmer, Keith Olsen, Roberto Scandiuzzi	EMI, CD: 556459 2	Studio recording made 2–5 July
1998	Virtuosi di Praga Orchestra, Consort Caritatis Choir, Howard Dyck	Heidi Klassen, Linda Maguire, Paul Frey, Phillip Ens	Consort Caritatis, CD: CC9811	Live recording made on 8 July at the Dvořák Hall, Rudolfinum, Prague
1998	NHK Symphony Orchestra, Nikikai Chorus, Myung-whun Chung	Tomoko Nakamura, Akemi Nishi, Shigehiro Sano, Tasuku Naono	King Record, CD: KICC 3034/5	Live recording made on 3 September at the NHK Hall, Tokyo
2000	Kirov Orchestra and Chorus, Valery Gergiev	Renée Fleming, Olga Borodina, Andrea Bocelli, Ildebrando D'Arcangelo	Philips, CD: 468 079-2 PH2	Studio recording made from 11 to 15 July at All Hallows Church, London
2001	Asia Philharmonic Orchestra, Incheon City Chorale, Suwon Civic Chorale, Ansan City Choir; Myung-whun Chung	Tomoko Nakamura, Akemi Nishi, Won-jun Lee; Hideto Ihara	Asia Star Networks, CD: ASNCD-001 (uncommercial)	Live recording made on 20 January at the Concert Hall of the Seoul Arts Center
2001	Australian Opera and Ballet Orchestra, Opera Australia Chorus, Simone Young	Rosamund Illing, Bernadette Cullen, Dennis O'Neill, Bruce Martin	ABC Classics, CD: 472 430-2	Live recording made on 22 and 24 January at the Concert Hall of the Sydney Opera House, Sydney
2001	Berlin Philharmonic, Eric Ericson Chamber Choir, Swedish Radio Choir, Orfeón Donostiarra, Claudio Abbado	Angela Gheorghiu, Daniela Barcellona, Roberto Alagna, Julian Konstantinov	EMI, DVD: DVB4 92693-9; EMI, CD: 557168-2	Recorded live on 27 January, the 100th anniversary of Verdi's death, in Berlin
2001	Staatskapelle Dresden, Chorus of the Staatsoper Dresden, Sinfoniechor Dresden; Giuseppe Sinopoli	Daniela Dessì, Elisabetta Fiorillo, Johan Botha, Roberto Scandiuzzi	private recording, CD	Live recording made on 13 and 14 February at the Semperoper, Dresden
2005	Orquesta Sinfónica del Principado de Asturias, Orfeón Donostiarra, Coro de la Fundación Príncipe de Asturias, Jesús López-Cobos	Indra Thomas, Luciana d'Intino, Roberto Aronica, René Pape	RTVE Musica, CD: 65252	Live recording made on 20 October in the Auditorio Principe Felipe, Oviedo
2006	Youth Orchestra of the Americas, EuropaChorAkademie; Plácido Domingo	Cristina Gallardo-Domâs, Fredrika Brillembourg, Marco Berti, Ildar Abdrazakov	Glor Classics, CD: 162202	Live recording made on 6 August at the Philharmonie am Gasteig, Munich
2009	Orchestra e Coro dell'Accademia Nazionale di Santa Cecilia, Antonio Pappano	Anja Harteros, Sonia Ganassi, Rolando Villazón, René Pape	EMI, CD: 6989362	Live recording made from 8 to 13 January in the Sala Santa Cecilia, Parco della Musica, Rome
2009	London Symphony Orchestra, Colin Davis	Christine Brewer, Karen Cargill, Stuart Neill, John Relyea	LSO Live, SACD: LSO 0693	Live recording, 11 and 14 January 2009 at the Barbican Centre, London
2010	Chicago Symphony Orchestra and Chorus; Riccardo Muti	Barbara Frittoli, Olga Borodina, Mario Zeffiri, Ildar Abdrazakov	SACD: CSO Resound 9011008; CD: CSO Resound 9011006	Recorded live at Orchestra Hall, Symphony Center, January 15, 2009 - January 17, 2009
2011	Sacramento Choral Society and Orchestra, Donald Kendrick	Karen Slack, Julie Simson, Bjorn Arvidsson, Kevin Thompson	Living Sound, CD: EAN 0884501515214	Live recording made at UC Davis Mondavi Center on March 19, 2011, Davis, CA, USA
2012	Orchestra e Coro del Teatro alla Scala, Milano; Daniel Barenboim	Anja Harteros, Elīna Garanča; Jonas Kaufmann; René Pape	Decca Classics, CD (2): 0289 478 5245 2 DVD: 0440 074 3807 7 Blu-ray: 0440 074 3808 4	Live recording made on 27 and 28 August at the Teatro alla Scala, Milan
2015	New York Philharmonic, Alan Gilbert (conductor) New York Choral Artists, Joseph Flummerfelt (director)	Angela Meade, Lilli Paasikivi, Brandon Jovanovich, Eric Owens	Digital Recording	Live recording made January 15–17, 2015, Avery Fischer Hall at Lincoln Center.
