= Norma discography =

This is a list of recordings of Norma, a two-act opera by Vincenzo Bellini with an Italian-language libretto by Felice Romani. It was first performed on 26 December 1831, at La Scala in Milan.

Year	Cast: (Norma, Pollione, Adalgisa, Oroveso)	Conductor, Opera House and Orchestra (Recording/production details)	Label
1937	Gina Cigna, Giovanni Martinelli, Bruna Castagna, Ezio Pinza	Ettore Panizza, Metropolitan Opera Orchestra and Chorus (Live broadcast, 20 February 1937, Metropolitan Opera House)	CD: Metropolitan Opera
1937	Gina Cigna, Giovanni Breviario, Ebe Stignani, Tancredi Pasero	Vittorio Gui, Orchestra and Chorus of the EIAR Torino	CD: Premiere Opera; Cat: CDNO 322-2
1944	Zinka Milanov, Frederick Jagel, Jennie Tourel, Norman Cordon	Cesare Sodero, Metropolitan Opera Chorus and Orchestra (Live broadcast, Metropolitan Opera House, 30 December 1944)	CD: Myto; Cat: 2 MCD 954.137
1952	Maria Callas, Mirto Picchi, Ebe Stignani, Giacomo Vaghi, Clotilde: Joan Sutherland	Vittorio Gui, Royal Opera House Chorus and Orchestra (Recorded live, 8 November 1952)	CD: EMI Classics; Cat: 562 668-2
1954	Maria Callas, Mario Filippeschi, Ebe Stignani; Nicola Rossi-Lemeni	Tullio Serafin, Chorus and Orchestra of the Teatro alla Scala, (Studio recording, 23 April – 3 May 1954)	LP: Columbia; Cat: 33CX 1179-81; CD: EMI Classics; Cat: 586 8342
1955	Maria Callas, Mario del Monaco, Ebe Stignani, Giuseppe Modesti	Tullio Serafin, Orchestra and Chorus of the RAI Rome (Concert performance, Rome RAI, 29 June 1955)	CD: Myto; Cat: 00140
1955	Maria Callas, Mario del Monaco, Giulietta Simionato, Nicola Zaccaria	Antonino Votto, Chorus and Orchestra of the Teatro alla Scala (Recorded live, 7 December 1955)	CD: Myto; Cat: MCD 00153
1960	Maria Callas, Franco Corelli, Christa Ludwig, Nicola Zaccaria	Tullio Serafin, Chorus and Orchestra of the Teatro alla Scala (Studio recording, 5–12 September 1960)	CD: EMI Classics; Cat: CMS 5 66428-2
1964	Joan Sutherland, John Alexander, Marilyn Horne, Richard Cross	Richard Bonynge, London Symphony Orchestra, London Symphony Chorus, (Studio recording)	LP: RCA Victor; Cat: LSC-6166; CD: Decca; Cat: 475 7902; 000717202 (USA)
1964	Leyla Gencer, Bruno Prevedi, Adriana Lazzarini, William Wildermann	Bruno Bartoletti, Orchestra and Chorus of the Teatro Colón	CD: live-rare-opera Cat: Not given
1967	Elena Souliotis, Mario del Monaco, Fiorenza Cossotto, Carlo Cava	Silvio Varviso, Orchestra dell'Accademia Nazionale di Santa Cecilia	CD: London; Cat: POCL 3824-5
1972	Montserrat Caballé, Plácido Domingo, Fiorenza Cossotto, Ruggero Raimondi	Carlo Felice Cillario, London Philharmonic Orchestra, Ambrosian Opera Chorus	LP: RCA Red Seal; Cat: LSC-6202; CD: RCA Red Seal; Cat: 88875073482
1973	Montserrat Caballé, Carlo Cossutta, Fiorenza Cossotto, Giorgio Tozzi	Carlo Felice Cillario, Metropolitan Opera Orchestra and Chorus (Recorded live, 17 February 1973)	Streaming audio: Met Opera on Demand
1973	Beverly Sills, Enrico Di Giuseppe, Shirley Verrett, Paul Plishka	James Levine, New Philharmonia Orchestra, John Alldis Choir	LP: ABC; Cat: ATS-20017; CD: DGG; Cat: 477 8186
1974	Montserrat Caballé, Jon Vickers, Josephine Veasey; Agostino Ferrin	Giuseppe Patanè, Orchestra and Chorus of the Teatro Regio di Torino, (Recorded live, 27 July, Théâtre antique d'Orange, Orange Festival)	CD: Opera d'Oro; Cat: OPD 1140; DVD: VAI; Cat: 4229
1979	Renata Scotto, Giuseppe Giacomini, Tatiana Troyanos, Paul Plishka	James Levine, National Philharmonic Orchestra, Ambrosian Opera Chorus	CD: Sony; Cat: 88697446182
1981	Joan Sutherland, Francisco Ortiz, Tatiana Troyanos, Justino Diaz	Richard Bonynge, Canadian Opera Company Orchestra and Chorus	DVD: VAI; Cat: DVDVAI 4202
1984	Joan Sutherland, Luciano Pavarotti, Montserrat Caballé, Samuel Ramey	Richard Bonynge, Orchestra and Chorus of the Welsh National Opera	CD: London; Cat: POCL 2891-3
1986	Maria Bieșu, Gegam Grigoryan, Ludmila Nam; Georgi Seleznev	Mark Ermler, Orchestra and Chorus of the Bolshoi Theatre	CD: Melodiya; Cat: MCD 160
1994	Jane Eaglen, Vincenzo La Scola, Eva Mei, Dmitri Kavrakos	Riccardo Muti, Orchestra and chorus of the Maggio Musicale Fiorentino (Teatro Alighieri, Ravenna, VII 1994)	CD: EMI; Cat: B008L41Z0Q
2001	June Anderson, Shin Young Hoon, Daniela Barcellona, Ildar Abdrazakov	Fabio Biondi, Europa Galante, Verdi Festival Chorus (Recorded live, March 2001, Teatro Regio, Parma)	DVD: TDK; Cat: DV ONOR
2005	Dimitra Theodossiou, Carlo Ventre, Nidia Palacios, Riccardo Zanellato	Giuliano Carella, Orchestra and Chorus of the Teatro Massimo Bellini (Catania) (Recorded live, June)	DVD: Dynamic; Cat: 33493
2007	Dimitra Theodossiou, Carlo Ventre, Daniela Barcellona, Simon Orfila	Paolo Arrivabeni, Fondazione Orchestra Regionale delle Marche, Coro Lirico Marchigiano "Vincenzo Bellini" (Recorded live, August 2007, Sferisterio Opera Festival, Macerata)	DVD: Dynamic; Cat: 33561
2013	Cecilia Bartoli, John Osborn, Sumi Jo; Michele Pertusi	Giovanni Antonini, Orchestra La Scintilla, Zurich (playing on period instruments)	CD: Decca; Cat: 0289 478 3517 2
2015	Sondra Radvanovsky, Gregory Kunde, Ekaterina Gubanova, Raymond Aceto	Renato Palumbo, Gran Teatre del Liceu orchestra and chorus (Kevin Newbury, stage director; recorded live, February 2015)	Blu-ray/DVD: C major Cat:737208
2016	Sonya Yoncheva, Joseph Calleja, Sonia Ganassi, Brindley Sherratt	Antonio Pappano, The Royal Opera orchestra and chorus (Àlex Ollé, stage director; recorded live, 26 September 2016)	HD video: Royal Opera Stream; Blu-ray/DVD: Opus Arte; Cat:OA1247D
2017	Sondra Radvanovsky, Joseph Calleja, Joyce DiDonato, Matthew Rose	Carlo Rizzi, Metropolitan Opera Orchestra and Chorus (David McVicar, production; recorded live, 7 October 2017)	HD video: Met Opera on Demand; Blu-ray/DVD: Erato
2018	Mariella Devia, Stefan Pop, Annalisa Stroppa, Riccardo Fassi	Andrea Battistoni, Teatro Carlo Felice orchestra and chorus (Teatrialchemici, Luigi di Gangi and Ugo Giacomazzi, stage direction)	DVD: Bongiovanni; Cat: AB 20041
2025	Asmik Grigorian, Freddie De Tommaso, Aigul Akhmetshina, Tareq Nazmi	Francesco Lanzillotta, Theater an der Wien, Wiener Symphoniker, Vienna (Stage director: Vasily Barkhatov; recorded live, 23 February)	Streaming video: Arte

Note: "Cat:" is short for catalogue number by the label company.
