= Bruno Landi (tenor) =

Italian opera singer

Bruno Landi (25 April 1900 – 8 May 1968) was an Italian operatic tenor.

== Biography ==
Born in Volterra, Landi was a light tenor "with a clear voice, considerable extension and issue easy and very well controlled, but frequently resorted to the notes in falsetto" who debuted in 1925 at Campi Bisenzio in the role of the Duke of Mantua in Rigoletto.

In 1927 in Florence, he sang in the role of Count Almaviva in Rossini's The Barber of Seville. In 1931 he performed again in The Barber of Seville at the Teatro Regio of Parma, where he returned in 1939 in Faust, with Magda Olivero, Andrea Mongelli and Tancredi Pasero. In 1933 he sang in Gianni Schicchi and in I quatro rusteghi at the Rome Opera House. During 1936, he debuted at the Scala as Fenton in Falstaff, under the direction of Victor De Sabata and a cast which included Maria Caniglia, Mafalda Favero and Mariano Stabile.

In 1938 Bruno Landi took part in a tour in the United States, appearing in San Francisco, Philadelphia, Cincinnati and at the Metropolitan Opera in New York, in Rigoletto, L'elisir d'amore, L'amico Fritz and Martha. At the Metropolitan, he was cast for seven seasons.

He later left for Latin America, where he sang in Mexico City, Montevideo, Buenos Aires, Caracas, Santiago and Rosario.

He returned to La Scala in 1939 for the world premiere of La dama boba of Ermanno Wolf-Ferrari. In 1947 at the Teatro Pergolesi in Jesi, he was the protagonist in Manon with a very young Renata Scotto. His most popular roles were Count Almaviva in The Barber of Seville and Des Grieux in Manon.

In the forties, at the height of his vocal powers, he recorded two complete works: The Barber of Seville and Rigoletto, in addition to some individual tracks, now remastered on CD.

He retired from the stage at the end of the 1950s and settled in Buenos Aires, where he taught singing with his wife, the Argentinian soprano Hilde Reggiani. He died in Buenos Aires at the age of 68.

== Repertoire ==
Role	Work	Composer
Basil	The Marriage of Figaro	Mozart
Elvino	La sonnambula	Bellini
Count Almaviva	The Barber of Seville	Rossini
Ramiro	La Cenerentola	Rossini
Nemorino	L'elisir d'amore	Donizetti
Ernesto	Don Pasquale	Donizetti
Fernando	La Favorite	Donizetti
Edgardo	Lucia di Lammermoor	Donizetti
Duke of Mantua	Rigoletto	Verdi
Alfredo Germont	La Traviata	Verdi
Fenton	Falstaff	Verdi
Rodolfo	La bohème	Puccini
Mario Cavaradossi	Tosca	Puccini
Pinkerton	Madame Butterfly	Puccini
Rinuccio	Gianni Schicchi	Puccini
Fritz	L'amico Fritz	Mascagni
Des Grieux	Manon	Massenet
Werther	Werther	Massenet
Nicias	Thaïs	Massenet
Faust	Faust	Gounod
Huon of Bordeaux	Oberon	von Weber
Nadir	Les pêcheurs de perles	Bizet
Wilhelm	Mignon	Thomas
Lionel	Martha	von Flotow
Faust	Mefistofele	Boito
Count Riccardo	I quatro rusteghi	Wolf-Ferrari
Lorenzo	La dama boba	Wolf-Ferrari

== Discography ==
- Gioachino Rossini, The Barber of Seville, interpreters: Bruno Landi, Lily Pons, Pompilio Malatesta, John Charles Thomas, Josephine Tumina, Ezio Pinza. Chorus and Orchestra of the Metropolitan Opera, director Gennaro Papi – Live, 22 January 1938 – 33 rpm records by Unique Opera Records Corp. UORC129 USA
- Gioachino Rossini, The Barber of Seville, interpreters: Bruno Landi, Wilfred Engelman, Lucille Browning, Hilde Reggiani, Carlos Ramirez, Lorenzo Alvary, John Gurney. Orchestra, and Chorus RCA Victor Symphony Orchestra director Giuseppe Bamboschek – 1940
- Gioachino Rossini, The Barber of Seville, interpreters: Bruno Landi, Salvatore Baccaloni, Josephine Tuminia, John Charles Thomas, Wilfred Engelman, Ezio Pinza, Irma Petina, John Dudley. Orchestra and Chorus of the Metropolitan Opera Assoc. – Director Giuseppe Bamboschek – Live 1 March 1941 – 33 rpm records from The Golden Age of Opera (EJS139), remastered and r-issued on two CDs by Omega, for the series "Opera Archive", n° 393 – USA
- Giuseppe Verdi, Rigoletto, interpreters: Bruno Landi, Robert Weede, Hilde Reggiani, Nicola Moscona, Bruna Castagna . Orchestra and Chorus of the Metropolitan Opera of New York, director Ettore Panizza, live recording 1942
- Giuseppe Verdi, Rigoletto, interpreters: Bruno Landi, Hilde Reggiani, Frank Valentino. Orchestra and Chorus of the Teatro Eliseo of Rome, director Manrico De Tura – 1953
- Giacomo Puccini, La Bohème: "Che gelida manina"
- Gioachino Rossini, The Barber of Seville: "Ecco ridente in ciel"
- Gaetano Donizetti, Don Pasquale 'Povero Ernesto"
- Jules Massenet, Werther: "Ah non-mi ridestar"
- Friedrich von Flotow, Martha: "M'aparì"

== Sources ==
- Dionisio Petrella, Los italianos en la historia de la Argentine culture , Asociación Dante Alighieri, 1979.
