= Cloe Elmo =

Italian opera singer

- Cloe Elmo in Carmen (photo with dedication)
- Occupation: opera singer

Cloe (or Cloë) Elmo (April 9, 1910 – May 24, 1962) was an Italian operatic dramatic mezzo-soprano, particularly associated with the Italian repertory.

She was born in Lecce and began singing at an early age. By the age of seventeen, she had begun her studies at the Accademia di Santa Cecilia in Rome with Edwige Chibaudo, and later with Rinolfi and Pedreni. Due to her wide vocal range, she was initially thought to be a soprano.

She made her debut in Cagliari as Santuzza in Cavalleria rusticana in 1934. Within a year, she joined the Teatro alla Scala in Milan as Meg Page in Verdi's Falstaff. Soon she was given the part of Azucena in Il trovatore, which quickly became her signature role and was her debut role at the Metropolitan Opera in 1947. Other roles there included Santuzza, Ulrica in Un ballo in maschera, Mrs Quickly in Falstaff — the latter she recorded in 1950, opposite Giuseppe Valdengo — and Herva Nelli, with Arturo Toscanini conducting.

She sang Wagnerian roles in Italian, as was the custom during this time period, including Brangaene at La Scala to the Isolde of Giuseppina Cobelli, and Ortrud. She made a notable recording (singing in Italian) of Brangaene's watch from Act 2.

She made recordings (also in Italian) of lieder by Brahms and Strauss. She also recorded discs of duets from La Gioconda, Aida, and Adriana Lecouvreur with the dramatic soprano Gina Cigna, which reveal both her powerful voice and passionate temperament.

She returned to Italy after her tenure at the Metropolitan opera (her career there was not as successful as she had hoped), and she sang at La Scala until 1954 when she abandoned her stage career. By that time, the top notes in her voice had disintegrated. She accepted a teaching position in Ankara, where she remained until her death in 1962.

== Sources ==
- The Metropolitan Opera Encyclopedia, edited by David Hamilton, (Simon & Schuster, 1987), ISBN 0-671-61732-X
- Notes from Preiser CD compilation of some of her recordings.
- Biography, cantabile-subito.de. Accessed 29 December 2022.
