= Giovanni Breviario =

Italian opera singer

Giovanni Breviario (photo with 1944 dedication)

Giovanni Breviario as Pollione in Norma, Teatro Reale, Rome, 1944

Giovanni Breviario (27 November 1891 – 8 October 1982), was an Italian operatic tenor, particularly associated with Italian dramatic roles.

Breviario was born at Bergamo. He studied in Milan with Dante Lari, and made his stage debut in Pola, as Manrico, in 1924. He then sang the Italian repertory to considerable acclaim in the Netherlands from 1927 to 1934.

In Italy, he sang at the Teatro Carlo Felice in Parma, La Fenice in Venice, Teatro Regio Parma, Teatro San Carlo in Naples, Teatro alla Scala in Milan. Abroad he appeared at Teatro Nacional Sao Carlos in Lisbon, Hungarian State Opera in Budapest, also making guest appearances at the opera houses of Malta and Cairo.

He was especially appreciated in heroic roles such as; Pollione, Raoul, Radames, Otello, Canio, Andrea Chénier, Cavaradossi, etc.

He retired from the stage in 1949, and became a teacher at the Music Conservatory of Johannesburg in South Africa. He spent his last years in his native Bergamo, where he died.

Breviario is probably best remembered for his Pollione in the first complete recording of Norma in 1937, opposite Gina Cigna, Ebe Stignani, Tancredi Pasero, under Vittorio Gui.

== Sources ==
- Operissimo.com, "Breviario, Giovanni"
