= Gino Marinuzzi =

Italian composer and conductor

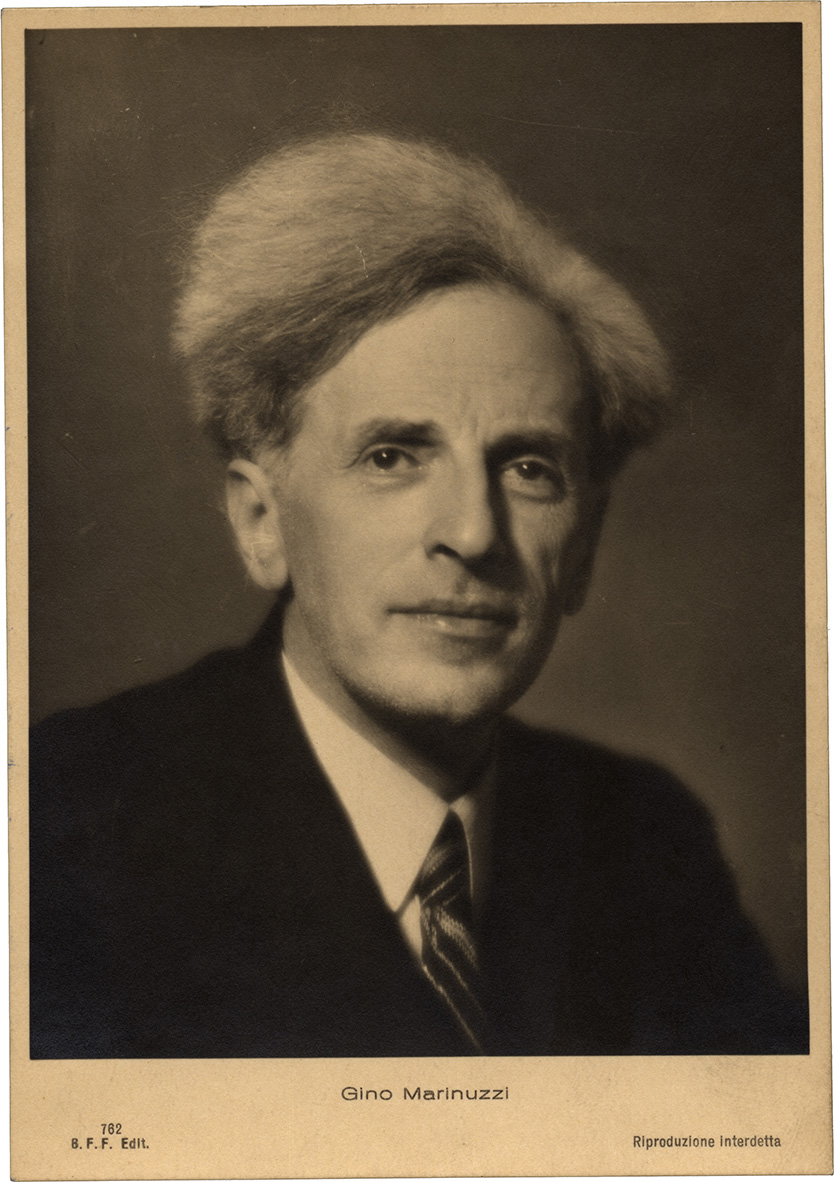
- Gino Marinuzzi
- Born: 24 March 1882; Palermo, Italy
- Died: 17 September 1945 (aged 63); Milan, Italy

Gino Marinuzzi (24 March 1882 – 17 August 1945) was an Italian conductor and composer, particularly associated with the operas of Wagner and the Italian repertory.

== Biography ==
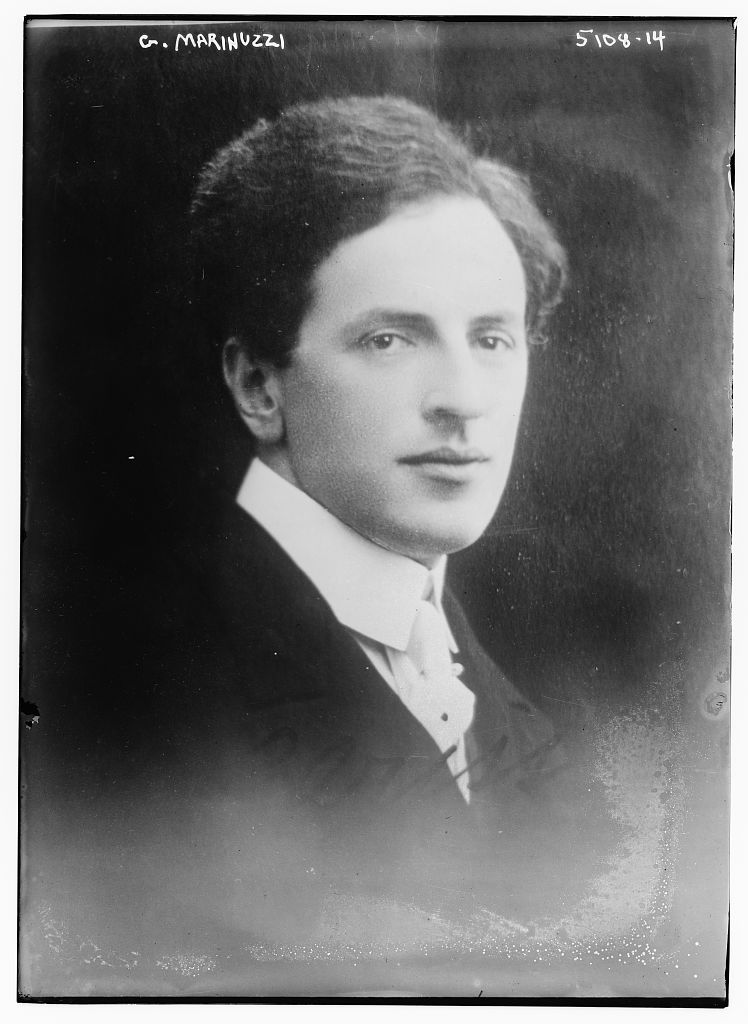
Gino Marinuzzi about 1920

Marinuzzi was born and studied in Palermo, graduating from the Palermo Conservatory. He began his career in Palermo as well, conducting the local premieres of Tristan und Isolde in 1909, and Parsifal in 1914. He then appeared in Rome and Milan, where he conducted several local premieres (mostly Wagner operas) and many revivals of rarely performed operas such as Lucrezia Borgia, La straniera, Beatrice di Tenda and L'incoronazione di Poppea. In 1930, he conducted the world premiere of Ildebrando Pizzetti's Lo straniero.

He made guest appearances at the Paris Opéra, the Royal Opera House in London, and the Monte Carlo Opera, where he conducted the world premiere of Puccini's La rondine in 1917. He was artistic director of the Chicago Opera Association from 1919 to 1921, and the Rome Opera from 1928 to 1934. He conducted opera at the Teatro Colón in Buenos Aires during seven seasons between 1915 and 1933. This included the Western Hemisphere premieres of Puccini's La rondine (first version) in 1917 and Turandot in June 1926 with Claudia Muzio and Giacomo Lauri-Volpi, two months after the world premiere at La Scala.

He was reputed for his "grand style" inherited from the post-romantic tradition.

He left a noted recording of La forza del destino from 1941, with Maria Caniglia, Galliano Masini, Carlo Tagliabue, Ebe Stignani, Tancredi Pasero, and Saturno Meletti.

He died in Milan in 1945, aged 63.

== Legacy ==
His son Gino Marinuzzi Jr (7 April 1920, New York City – 8 November 1996, Rome, Italy) was also a conductor and composer of music for films. A competition for young conductors was established in his memory in San Remo.

== Works ==
Operas:

- Barberina (Teatro Massimo, Palermo, 1903),
- Jacquerie (Teatro Colón, Buenos Aires, 1918)
- Palla de' Mozzi (La Scala, Milan, 1932).

Orchestral:

- Suite siciliana (1909)
- Sicania (1912)
- Sinfonia in A (1943)
- Preludio & Preghiera
