= La dama boba =

Play by Lope de Vega

La dama boba (given various titles in English including The Lady Simpleton, The Lady Boba: a Woman of Little Sense, ''Lady Nitwit, The Lady-Fool) is a 1613 comedy by the Spanish playwright Lope de Vega. It is one of the earliest examples of the "comedia palatina" subgenre. De Vega completed it on 28 April 1613, as shown by a surviving manuscript copy in his own hand.

== Translations ==
- The Lady Simpleton Max Oppenheimer, Jr. Lawrence, KS: Coronado 1976
- Lady Nitwit trans. William I. Oliver Editorial Bilingüe, 1998
- Wit's end: an adaptation of Lope de Vega's La dama boba Edward H. Friedman 2000
- The Lady Boba: a Woman of Little Sense David Johnston 2013

== Adaptations ==
- 1939 - La dama boba (opera). Ermanno Wolf-Ferrari set the play as an opera in 1939.
- 1969 - La dama boba Estudio 1
- 1980 - La dama boba Estudio 1
- 2006 - La dama boba (film)
