= Nuova Era (record label) =

Italian classical record label

Nuova Era was an Italian classical record label founded by Marco Rho in 1985.

It is primarily known for recordings of live performances from Italian opera houses and broadcast performances from the RAI archives. Originally based in Asti, Piemonte, Italy the label was acquired by Membran Entertainment Group GmbH. in Hamburg.
