= Saturno Meletti =

Italian opera singer

- Saturno Meletti (photo with 1946 dedication)
- Occupation: opera singer
- Years active: 1932-1976

Saturno Meletti (1906 in Fano – 23 September 1985 in Rome) was an Italian operatic bass-baritone particularly associated with the standard Italian repertory and contemporary works.

Meletti began his career in his native city as Escamillo, in 1929, later appearing in several small theatres throughout Italy.

He made his debut at the Rome Opera in 1932, and sang there until 1976. He then appeared at the Teatro Comunale in Bologna, the Teatro Regio Parma, the San Carlo in Naples, the Teatro Massimo in Palermo, the Maggio Musicale Fiorentino in Florence, and La Scala in Milan, etc. He also made guest appearances in Germany, Switzerland, Egypt, and South America.

He took part in many creations, notably Gian Francesco Malipiero's Antonio e Cleopatra (Florence, 1938), Ildebrando Pizzetti's Vanna Lupa (Rome, 1947), Adriano Lualdi's La Luna di Cairibi (Milan, 1953), Renzo Rossellini's La Guerra (Naples, 1956).

He can be heard on several recordings with Cetra, notably as Melitone in La forza del destino, under Gino Marinuzzi, and as David in L'amico Fritz, under Pietro Mascagni, but also in La cenerentola, Falstaff, Manon Lescaut, Adriana Lecouvreur.

== Sources ==
- Operissimo
