= Veggiano =

- Comune
- Comune di Veggiano
- Location within Italy Location within Veneto
- Coordinates: 45°27′N 11°43′E
- Country: Italy
- Region: Veneto
- Province: Padua (PD)

Government
  - Mayor: Anna Lazzarin

Area
  - Total: 16.2 km^{2} (6.3 sq mi)

Population (2007)
  - Total: 3,894
  - Density: 240/km^{2} (623/sq mi)
- Demonym: Veggianesi
- Time zone: UTC+1 (CET)
  - Summer (DST): UTC+2 (CEST)
- Postal code: 35030
- Dialing code: 049

Veggiano is a comune (municipality) in the Province of Padua in the Italian region Veneto, located about 45 kilometres (28 mi) west of Venice and about 12 kilometres (7 mi) northwest of Padua.
