= Gertrude Grob-Prandl =

Austrian opera singer (1917–1995)

Gertrude Grob-Prandl (11 November 1917 – 16 May 1995) was an Austrian Wagnerian soprano.

Grob-Prandl was born in Vienna and studied at the Vienna Academy of Music with Singer-Burian. She originally intended to become a piano teacher but the professors at the conservatory began to notice the size of her voice and she was placed in a singing class. Besides size, her voice had a distinctive burnished timbre and a tight, brisk, consistent vibrato. She made her debut in 1939 at the Vienna Volksoper as Santuzza in Cavalleria rusticana. She graduated to heavier roles such as Isolde, Brünnhilde and Turandot. She retired in 1972.

Irmgard Seefried once remarked that the "walls shook" when Grob-Prandl sang Turandot. A popular anecdote states that she was once interrupted while performing as Turandot, by fire-fighters. People outside the theater had mistaken her for a fire-alarm siren.

Available recordings include Donna Anna in Don Giovanni, Isabelle in Robert le Diable, Brünnhilde, Isolde, First Lady in The Magic Flute, as well as Elektra, Turandot, and Elettra in Idomeneo. There is also an anthology of her solo work.

She died on 16 May 1995 in the city of her birth.
