= La dama boba (opera) =

Opera by Emanno Wolf-Ferrari

La dama boba is a commedia lirica by Ermanno Wolf-Ferrari in 3 acts to a libretto by Mario Ghisalberti, after Lope de Vega's 1613 play of the same title. It was premiered 1 February 1939 at La Scala, Milan under it:Umberto Berrettoni, with Mafalda Favero in the lead role. There are several recordings of the overture, one by Nello Santi conducting Orchestre de la Société des Concerts du Conservatoire de Paris [Decca 480 5374].
