= Bruna Castagna =

Italian singer

Bruna Castagna (Bari, October 15, 1905 – Pinamar, July 10, 1983) was an Italian mezzo-soprano.

== Biography ==
Castagna was the daughter of Luigi and Maria Catacchio, and studied piano in Milan prior to turning to singing as a career. She debuted at the Teatro Communale in Mantua in 1925, singing the role of Marina Mniszech in Boris Godunov by Modest Mussorgsky. That same year she began appearing at the Teatro Colón in Buenos Aires, singing such roles as Zita in Gianni Schicchi, Bersi in Andrea Chénier, the shepherd in Tosca, Anciana in L'amore dei tre re, and Amelfa in The Golden Cockerel. 1925 also saw her bow at the Teatro alla Scala in Milan. There she would go on to perform a variety of roles, both major and minor; she would also take part in the world premiere of Il Dibuk of Lodovico Rocca in 1934. In 1934 Castagna moved to the United States, soon becoming known for her performances in the Italian and French repertoire. Among the roles which she took on during this time were Amneris in Aida, Azucena in Il trovatore, Adalgisa in Norma, Laura in La Gioconda, Ulrica in Un ballo in maschera, Leonora in La favorita, Carmen, and Delilah in Samson et Dalila. She appeared at the Metropolitan Opera and at the San Francisco Opera, and sang as well in Latin America. Castagna retired in 1945 and settled permanently in Argentina.

== Discography ==
- Verdi – Aida – Cigna, Martinelli, Castagna, Morelli, Pinza – Dir. Panizza – Metropolitan, live 1937 ed. Myto
- Bellini – Norma – Cigna, Martinelli, Castagna, Pinza – Dir. Panizza – Metropolitan, live 1937 ed. GOP
- Verdi – Messa di requiem – Milanov, Kullman, Castagna, Moscona – Dir. Toscanini – New York, live 1938 ed. Archipel
- Ponchielli – La Gioconda – Milanov, Martinelli, Morelli, Castagna, Moscona – Dir. Panizza – Metropolitan, live 1939 ed. Myto
- Rossini – Petite Messe Solennelle – Ginster, Kullman, Castagna, Warren – Dir. Barbirolli – Carnegie Hall, live 1939 ed. Guild
- Verdi – Aida (selez.) – Milanov, Gigli, Castagna, Tagliabue – Dir. Panizza – Metropolitan, live 1939 ed. EJS/Lyric Distribution
- Verdi – Messa di requiem – Milanov, Castagna, Bjorling, Moscona – Dir. Toscanini – Carnegie Hall, live 1940 ed. Melodram
- Verdi – Un ballo in maschera – Bjorling, Milanov, Castagna, Svèd, Andreva – Dir. Panizza – Metropolitan, live 1940 ed. Arkadia/Myto/GOP
- Verdi – Aida – Martinelli, Roman, Castagna, Warren, Pinza – Dir. Panizza – Metropolitan, live 1941 ed. Cantus Classics
- Verdi – Il trovatore – Bjorling, Greco, Castagna, Valentino, Moscona – Dir. Calusio – Metropolitan, live 1941 ed. Cetra/Arkadia
- Verdi – Un ballo in maschera – Martinelli, Roman, Bonelli, Castagna – Dir. Panizza – Metropolitan, live 1942 ed. EJS/Eklipse
- Verdi – Rigoletto – Weede, Reggiani, Landi, Moscona – Dir. Panizza – Metropolitan live 1942 ed. Bongiovanni
- Verdi – Aida – Milanov, Castagna, Martinelli, Bonelli, Cordon – Dir. Pelletier – Metropolitan, live 1943 ed. Cetra/GOP/Cantus Classics
- Ponchielli – La Gioconda – Roman, Jagel, Warren, Castagna, Moscona – Dir. Cooper – Metropolitan, live 1945 ed. Gala
- Verdi – Il trovatore – Baum, Milanov, Warren, Castagna, Moscona – Dir. Sodero – Metropolitan, live 1945 ed. Walhall
