= Maria Nemeth =

Hungarian singer (1897–1967)

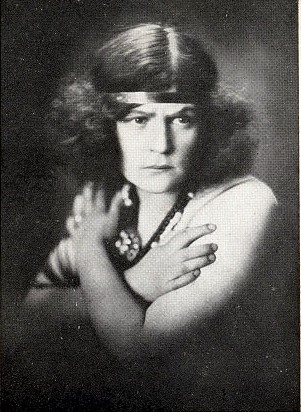
Németh Mária-Aida

Maria Nemeth (Hungarian: Németh Mária; 13 March 1897 – 28 December 1967) was a Hungarian dramatic coloratura soprano, particularly associated with the Italian repertory, one of the leading dramatic sopranos of the inter-war period.

== Life and career ==
Nemeth was born in Körmend. She studied first in Budapest with Georg Anthes and Géza László, in Milan with Giannina Russ, in Naples with Fernando de Lucia, and Vienna with Kaschowska. She made her stage debut in Budapest, as Sulamith in Karl Goldmark's The Queen of Sheba, in 1923. She began her career by singing lyric and high soprano roles, gradually adding dramatic roles to her repertoire.

Star soprano at the Vienna State Opera from 1925 until 1946, she also appeared at the Paris Opéra in 1928, as Constanze in the Abduction from the Seraglio, and at the Royal Opera House in London, as Turandot, in 1931.

Her amazing voice and remarkable technique enabled her to excel in roles as diverse as Constanze and Queen of Night, Amelia and Aida. Considered one of the best Donna Anna, Tosca, and Turandot of her time. She also tackled Wagner roles, such as Brünnhilde, with success. She died in Vienna.

== Sources ==
- Le guide de l'opéra, les indispensables de la musique, R. Mancini & J-J. Rouveroux, (Fayard, 1986), ISBN 2-213-01563-5
