= Gina Cigna =

French-Italian dramatic soprano

- Gina Cigna (photo with dedication)
- Born: Genoveffa Cigna; 6 March 1900
- Died: 26 June 2001 (aged 101)
- Other names: Geneviève Sens; Genoveffa Sens; Ginetta Sens
- Occupation: Operatic soprano

Gina Cigna (born Genoveffa Cigna, 6 February 1900 – 26 June 2001) was a French-born dramatic soprano of Italian ancestry. Originally trained as a concert pianist at the Paris Conservatory, she began her career as a recitalist on that instrument. After marrying the opera singer Maurice Sens in 1923, she studied singing in Paris and Italy before making her opera debut at La Scala in 1927 where she later performed regularly from 1929 until 1945. She had an international performance career in major opera houses until a car accident ended her stage career in 1947. Afterwords she worked as a voice teacher at the Milan Conservatory (1947–1953; and again after 1963), The Royal Conservatory of Music (1953–1963), the Accademia Musicale Chigiana (1957–1965), and at the opera school attached to La Scala.

== Biography ==
=== Early life and initial career as a pianist ===
Gina Cigna was born in Angers in the department of Maine-et-Loire on 6 February 1900 to parents of Italian origin. Her birth name was Genoveffa Cigna. She trained as a pianist at the Paris Conservatory where she was a pupil of Alfred Cortot. She graduated with a gold medal. She then started a career as a pianist with an emphasis as a recitalist. In 1923 she married the French tenor Maurice Sens of the Opéra-Comique, and with his encouragement turned toward pursuing a career as a singer. She and Maurice had one son, Pierre J. Sens.

=== Vocal studies and initial singing career ===
Cigna sought training as an opera singer, and her principal teachers in Paris were Emma Calvé and Lucette Korsoff. She also studied singing in Italy with Hariclea Darclée, Rosina Storchio and Giannina Russ. At the age of 26, Calvé arranged for her to audition for Arturo Toscanini for a position with the Teatro alla Scala in Milan; an audition which was successful. She made her professional opera debut at this theatre under the billing Ginette Sens in 1927; portraying Freia in Richard Wagner's Das Rheingold. Her debut failed to make an impression, and she spent the next two years performing mainly in Trieste, Capri, Nice, Verona, Florence and Pavia in the Italian repertoire.

In 1928, still performing as Ginette Sens, Cigna had success at the Opéra de Monte-Carlo as Musetta in La bohème, but later that year adopted the performance name of Gina Cigna when she appeared at the Teatro Comunale di Carpi for the first time in the title role of Catalani's Loreley. She had her first major success at La Scala in 1929 when she returned to the theatre as Donna Elvira in Mozart's Don Giovanni. She soon after appeared as Elisabeth in Tannhäuser.

=== International performance career ===
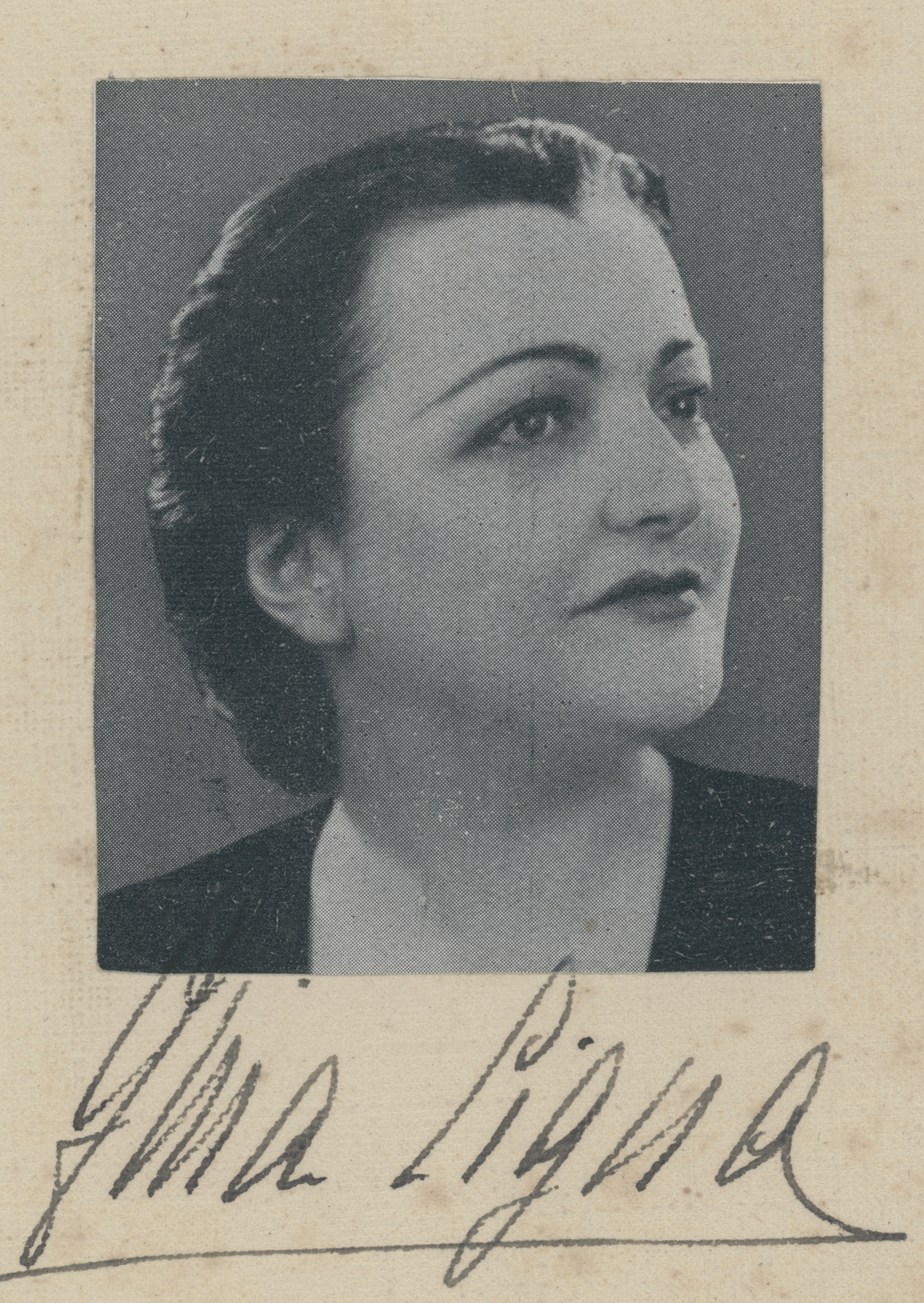
Gina Cigna (autographed photo)

Cigna sang in every season at La Scala from 1929 until 1943. She had a major success both at that theatre and at the Maggio Musicale Fiorentino (MMF) in 1933 as Abigaille in Verdi's Nabucco. The following year she appeared in Milan as Violetta in Verdi's La traviata with Tito Schipa as Alfredo and Sergio Failoni conducting. In 1935 she starred in La Scala's first staging of La fiamma. She also had great success in Milan in the title roles of Norma, La Gioconda, and Turandot. She returned to the MMF in important revivals of Gluck's Alceste (1935) and L'incoronazione di Poppea (1937). She also starred as Alaide in a rare revival of Bellini's La straniera at La Scala. He final performance at La Scala was in 1945.

From 1927 to 1937 Cigna was a regular performer at the Arena di Verona Festival; performing such roles as Norma and the title roles in Tosca and Turandot. In 1933 she made her debut at the Royal Opera House (ROH) in London as Marguerite in the United Kingdom premiere of Berlioz's La Damnation de Faust. She subsequently returned to the ROH for performances as Tosca (1936), the title role of Verdi's Aida (1937), and Leonora in Verdi's Il trovatore (1939). She made her debut at the Paris Opera as Aida in 1933, and subsequently returned to Paris as Norma in 1935 and Tosca in 1936.

Cigna was a guest artist at the Hungarian State Opera House in 1935-1936, and portrayed Tosca at the Romanian National Opera, Bucharest in 1936. In the summer of 1937 she performed the role of Leonora in Verdi's La forza del destino at the Stradivarius Festival in Cremona which was recorded for international radio broadcast. From 1936-1938 she sang many roles at the Bavarian State Opera; having previously sung there in 1931-1932.

Cigna sang Aida for her debut at the Metropolitan Opera ("the Met") in New York City in 1937. She returned to the Met for performances across four seasons; portraying the parts of Norma, Gioconda, Donna Elvira, Leonora in Il trovatore, and Santuzza in Cavalleria Rusticana. She also gave her first performance with the Chicago City Opera Company in 1937 as Norma with Frederick Jagel stepping in at the last minute as Pollione to replace an ailing Giovanni Martinelli. Norma was also her debut role at the San Francisco Opera in 1937 for that company's first staging of that opera. In 1938 she had success as Basiliola in Montemezzi's La nave at the Teatro dell'Opera di Roma under conductor Tullio Serafin.

In 1939 Cigna performed at the Teatro Colón as the main female character in the world premiere of Ettore Panizza's Bizancio; having previously sung Aida there in 1932. In 1940 she appeared at the Teatro Real in Madrid. In 1941 she performed the role of Kostelnička in Italy's first production of Janáček's Jenůfa at La Fenice. The latter part of her career was hampered by the events of World War II which put an end to her career at the Met. Gy the end of her career she had played 70 different characters in stage operas. Some of the other roles she performed during her career included Maddalena in Andrea Chénier, Amelia in Un ballo in maschera, Marguerite in Gounod's Faust, and the title roles in Strauss's Daphne and Respighi's Maria egiziaca.

=== Career conclusion, later life, and death ===
Cigna's career came to a halt in 1947 when she was involved in a serious car accident while traveling to Vicenza to perform as Tosca. While seriously bruised, she continued with the performance after which she collapsed and it was discovered she had suffered a heart attack. Forced to retire from singing, she turned to teaching. She taught for six years on the voice faculty of the Milan Conservatory prior to being appointed a teacher of singing at the The Royal Conservatory of Music (RCM) in Toronto, Canada in 1953. One of her pupils in Toronto was contralto Portia White. She was still teaching at the RCM as last as February 1963, but had left the teaching staff by the following May.

Cigna was a voice professor at the Accademia Musicale Chigiana in Sienna from 1957 to 1965; serving as a director of the annual summer opera program held during the months of July through September. After leaving the RCM she returned to the faculty of the Milan Conservatory. She also taught on the staff of the opera school attached to La Scala. In 1970 she was invited to give a masterclass at the British Institute of Recorded Sound. Her students included sopranos Josefina Arregui, Lynn Blaser, Ghena Dimitrova, Anna Kajabová-Peňášková, Carlotta Ordassy, and Maria Parazzini, and tenor Luis Lima. In 1981 she was awarded the Puccini Prize as "the century's best performer of Turandot"; a role she had reportedly sung 493 times during her career. In 1996 at the age of 96 she appeared in Jan Schmidt-Garre's film Opera Fanatic.

Cigna died in Milan on 26 June 2001, aged 101. Her first husband, Maurice, died sometime during her opera career. Her second husband was Mario Ferrari.

== Critical assessment ==
Harold Rosenthal stated that Cigna was "a highly dramatic and musical singer though her dark voice, with its attractive rapid vibrato, inclined to hardness under pressure." Martin Bernheimer stated that she and Maria Caniglia "embodied the common standard for Italian dramatic sopranos" of their era.

== Studio recordings ==
- Bellini - Norma - Gina Cigna, Ebe Stignani, Giovanni Breviario, Tancredi Pasero - Vittorio Gui - 1937
- Puccini - Turandot - Gina Cigna, Francesco Merli, Magda Olivero, Luciano Neroni - Franco Ghione - 1938, Cetra Records
