= Giuseppina Cobelli =

Italian opera singer

- Born: 1 August 1898; Maderno, Italy
- Died: 10 August 1948 (aged 50); Salò, Italy
- Occupation: Opera singer (soprano)

Giuseppina Cobelli (1 August 1898 - 10 August 1948) was an Italian operatic dramatic soprano.

She was born in Maderno on Lake Garda on 1 August 1898 and studied in Bologna and Hamburg. Her debut was as La Gioconda in Piacenza in 1924. She performed at La Scala from 1925 to 1942, and created the role of Silvana in Ottorino Respighi's La fiamma in Rome in 1934.

In Grove's Dictionary of Opera Singers she is described as "A beautiful woman with a highly individual voice and dramatic temperament".

She only made two commercial recordings and has been described as "now virtually forgotten star of La Scala" and a "forgotten opera singer".

She died in Barbarano, near Salò, on 10 August 1948.
