= Veriano Luchetti =

Italian opera singer

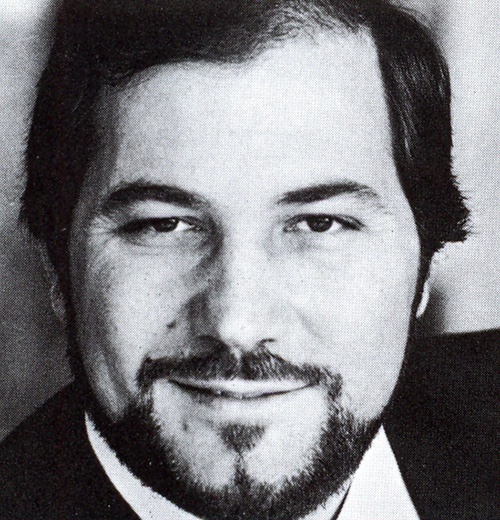

Veriano Luchetti (12 March 1939 – 23 April 2012) was an Italian tenor, whose career lasted from 1965 until the 1990s. He sang in operas rarely recorded, such as Gerusalemme and I Vespri Siciliani, the Italian versions of Verdi French Grand operas Jérusalem and Les Vêpres Siciliennes and L'africana, the Italian version of Meyerbeer French Grand opera L'Africaine. In 1969, he is Iopas in Les Troyens conducted by Georges Prêtre.
