= Giuseppe Giacomini =

Italian dramatic tenor (1940–2021)

- Born: 7 September 1940; Veggiano, Italy
- Died: 28 July 2021 (aged 80); Veggiano, Italy
- Citizenship: Italy
- Occupation: Opera singer (tenor)
- Known for: Dramatic opera roles

Giuseppe Giacomini (7 September 1940 – 28 July 2021) was an Italian dramatic tenor.

== Biography ==
Giacomini began his vocal career studying with Elena Ceriati, Marcello del Monaco and Vladimiro Badiali. After some success with song competitions around Italy, he made his professional debut in 1966 in Vercelli, as Pinkerton in Madame Butterfly. In 1969, he performed as Turiddu (Cavalleria rusticana) and Des Grieux (Manon Lescaut) in Parma and Modena. His first engagement outside Italy was in 1970 in Berlin, as Des Grieux in Manon Lescaut. He went on to sing in Il tabarro in Lisbon (1971), Tosca in Barcelona (1972) and Vienna (1973), and then at the Staatsoper in München in 1973.

In 1974, Giacomini made his South American debut in Buenos Aires at the Teatro Colón as Pinkerton in Madama Butterfly and Il tabarro. Giacomini returned to Italy to tremendous acclaim at the top houses - La Scala (Forza del Destino, 1974; La Bohème, 1975), Teatro San Carlo in Naples, Teatro Regio in Turin, Opera di Roma.

Giacomini made his North American debut as Ramerrez in La fanciulla del West in Connecticut, 1975, making his Metropolitan Opera debut the year afterwards in La forza del destino. He sang in Paris (Palais Garnier), in May 1976, as Alvaro in La forza del Destino. This performance earned him several more contracts with the house in the big Italian repertory: Macbeth, Don Carlo, Il trovatore, Pagliacci and Tosca in the next few years. He made his first Covent Garden appearance in 1980 in La Fanciulla del West.

Particular performances of note include his participation in the world premiere of Marco Tutino's La Lupa in Livorno in 1990, in the role of Nanni, and Des Grieux at the hundredth anniversary of the premiere of Puccini's Manon Lescaut at the Teatro Regio di Torino. He also sang for the Royal Family at the Covent Garden in 1988 and Mikhail Gorbachev in Moscow, took part in the historical staging of Aida set against the pyramids of Cairo in 1987 and was Calaf in Seoul on the occasion of the opening of the Olympic Games in 1988. He is also credited with the revival of rare operas, such as Donizetti's Fausta (Roma, 1981) and Leoncavallo's I Medici (Frankfurt, 1993). Included in his discography is a recording of Norma, with Renata Scotto (1979).

Giacomini's prizes and honours include the title Kammersänger of the Staatsoper in Wien, the Gold Viotti, the Giovanni Zenatello Prize, the C.A. Capelli Prize, the Gold Mascagni, and the Giovanni Martinelli Prize. He was also Commendatore of the Ordine of San Gregorio Magno, a Vatican order of knighthood.

Known colloquially as "Bepi", Giacomini continued to perform into his 60s, including a Cavaradossi in Tosca at the Royal Opera, Covent Garden. He gave a tour of China in 2010, where he worked with the Shanghai Philharmonic Orchestra under the baton of Muhai Tang. He gave a recital in the newly built Tianjin Concert Hall on 17 September 2010.

He died on 28 July 2021 in his hometown of Veggiano, Padua, Italy, aged 80.

== Additional sources ==
- Kennedy, Michael (2006), The Oxford Dictionary of Music, 985 pages, ISBN 0-19-861459-4
