= Melchiorre Luise =

Italian basso

Melchiorre Luise (photo with dedication)

Melchiorre Luise (December 21, 1896 – November 22, 1967) was a leading exponent of the operatic basso buffo repertoire.

In 1925, he made his debut as a baritone, but soon embarked on the classic roles of the basso buffo. He was seen at the Teatro alla Scala from 1938, and debuted at the Metropolitan Opera in 1947, where he sang until 1950.

At the Met, Luise appeared as the Innkeeper in Manon (opposite Licia Albanese, then Bidu Sayão and Eleanor Steber), the Sacristan in Tosca (in Dino Yannopoulos's production), as the Bonze in Madama Butterfly (with Dorothy Kirsten), as Benoît and Alcindoro in La bohème (with Jan Peerce, then Jussi Björling), as Don Bartolo in Il barbiere di Siviglia (opposite Robert Merrill), as Maestro Spinelloccio in Gianni Schicchi (with Italo Tajo, later Salvatore Baccaloni, Nadine Conner, and Giuseppe di Stefano), and as Geronte de Ravoir in Manon Lescaut (with Stella Roman, Richard Tucker, and Frank Valentino). His final performance with the company was Edward Johnson's final night as General Manager: Tosca (with Ljuba Welitsch, Ferruccio Tagliavini, and Lawrence Tibbett).

His appearances at the Scala include Il cedulo (1951), Il barbiere di Siviglia (with Giulietta Simionato, 1952), Don Pasquale (conducted by Nino Sanzogno, and directed by Giorgio Strehler, 1952), La bohème (1952), Tosca (1953), La Wally (with Renata Tebaldi, Mario del Monaco, and the young Renata Scotto, conducted by Carlo Maria Giulini, 1953), I quatro rusteghi (1954 and 1957), and, again, Il barbiere (1956).

Luise's studio recordings include Don Pasquale (in the title role, with Scipio Colombo as Dr Malatesta, p. 1952), Il barbiere di Siviglia (opposite Gino Bechi and Victoria de los Ángeles, conducted by Tullio Serafin, 1952), L'elisir d'amore (led by Gabriele Santini, 1952), and, most notably, Tosca (with Maria Callas, di Stefano, and Tito Gobbi, conducted by Victor de Sabata, 1953).

In 1954, his Alcindoro in La bohème (conducted by Nino Sanzogno) was filmed by RAI.

The bass died in Milan, at the age of seventy, and is buried in that city's Cimitero Maggiore.
