= I quatro rusteghi =

Opera by Ermanno Wolf-Ferrari

- Comic opera by Ermanno Wolf-Ferrari
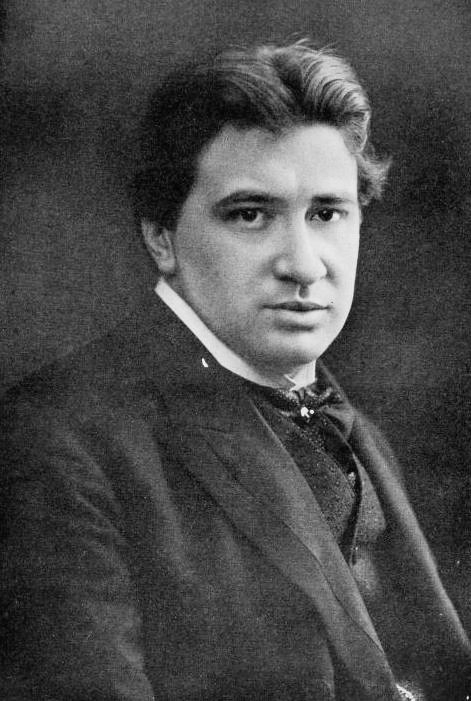
- The composer in 1906
- Translation: The Four Curmudgeons
- Librettist: Luigi Sugana; Giuseppe Pizzolato
- Language: Italian (Venetian dialect)
- Based on: I rusteghi by Carlo Goldoni
- Premiere: 19 March 1906 (in German); Hoftheater, Munich

I quatro rusteghi (The Four Curmudgeons, The Four Ruffians, in Edward J. Dent's translation School for Fathers, also translated by James Benner as Foolish Fathers) is a comic opera in three acts, music by Ermanno Wolf-Ferrari to a libretto by Luigi Sugana and Giuseppe Pizzolato based on Carlo Goldoni's 18th-century play I rusteghi. The opera is written in Venetian dialect, hence "quatro" instead of "quattro".

== Performance history ==
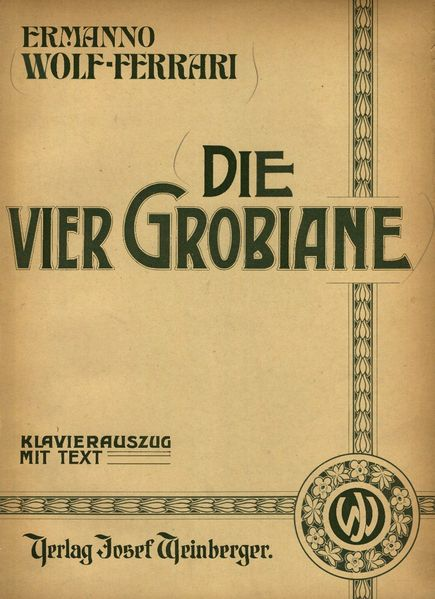
Title page piano-vocal score, 1906

The opera was first performed as Die vier Grobiane in German at the Hoftheater in Munich on 19 March 1906. Its first performance in Italian was on 2 June 1914 at the Teatro Lirico in Milan under Ettore Panizza. The work was first performed in the United States by the New York City Opera on 19 October 1951 with Laszlo Halasz conducting. Wolf-Ferrari's most successful full-length work, it is still regularly performed.

== Roles ==
Role	Voice type	Premiere cast, 19 March 1906 (Conductor: Felix Mottl)
Lunardo	bass	Georg Sieglitz
Margarita	mezzo-soprano	Margarethe Preuse-Matzenauer
Lucieta	soprano	Ella Tordek
Simone	bass	Paul Bender
Marina	soprano	Gehrer
Maurizio	bass	Josef Geis
Filipeto	tenor	Hans Koppe
Cancian	bass	Alfred Bauerberger
Felice	soprano	Hermine Bosetti
Riccardo	tenor	Raoul Walter

== Synopsis ==
The action takes place in 18th century Venice.

Four curmudgeonly husbands vainly attempt to keep their women in order. The women decide to teach their menfolk a lesson by allowing Lunardo's daughter Lucieta to see Filipeto, the son of Maurizio, before their pre-arranged marriage, even though the men have forbidden this.
