= Oralia Domínguez =

Mexican opera singer (1925–2013)

Oralia Dominguez
- Domínguez as Amneris in Aida (photo with dedication)
- Born: 25 October 1925; San Luis Potosí, Mexico
- Died: 25 November 2013 (aged 88); Milan, Italy
- Education: National Conservatory of Music
- Occupations: Operatic mezzo-soprano and contralto

Oralia Dominguez (25 October 1925 – 25 November 2013) was a Mexican operatic mezzo-soprano and contralto, who performed at many of the world's leading opera houses.

== Life and career ==
Dominguez was born in the city of San Luis Potosí in northern Mexico and studied at the National Conservatory of Music where she made the acquaintance of the composer Carlos Chavez who championed her career. She made her professional stage debut at the Mexico City Opera in 1950.

In 1951, she performed the role of Amneris in Verdi's Aida for the first time at the Palacio de Bellas Artes in Mexico City, alongside Maria Callas, Mario del Monaco, and Giuseppe Taddei conducted by Oliviero De Fabritiis.

She made her European debut in 1953 at London's Wigmore Hall. In the same year, she first appeared at La Scala, Milan, in Cilea's Adriana Lecouvreur, and performed with the company in Verdi's Requiem at the Lucerne Festival. She recorded the Requiem the following year, conducted by Victor de Sabata. In 1954, she appeared throughout Europe with such conductors as Tullio Serafin, Igor Markevitch, Paul Kletzki and Herbert von Karajan. In 1955, she made her debut at the Royal Opera House in London as Madame Sosostris in the world premiere of Michael Tippett's The Midsummer Marriage. Also in England, she appeared at Glyndebourne in the late 1950s as Isabella in Rossini's L'italiana in Algeri and Mistress Quickly in Verdi's Falstaff; she appeared in London in the latter role in 1967/68 as well.

In 1958, Dominguez was soloist in Mahler's Symphony No. 2 with Leonard Bernstein conducting the Orchestre National de la RTF. The performance took place in the Théâtre des Champs-Élysées in Paris.

Dominguez died in Milan, Italy, on 25 November 2013, at the age of 88.

== Recordings ==
Dominguez performed the role of Erda in Karajan's recording of Wagner's Ring cycle with the Berlin Philharmonic. She recorded also Vivaldi's Juditha triumphans (under Alberto Zedda). Her other recordings, mainly live performances, include Samson et Dalila, Aida, Ponchielli's La Gioconda (La Cieca), Puccini's Il tabarro, Verdi's Il Trovatore, Tippett's Midsummer Marriage, Verdi's Requiem, Mozart's Requiem, Rossini's Petite messe solennelle, De Falla's El amor brujo, Mahler's Das Lied von der Erde and Brahms's Alto Rhapsody. She recorded Bizet's Carmen (excerpts, in German) and a recital of arias (Donizetti, Rossini, Cilea, Verdi) made early in her career by Deutsche Grammophon which has been reissued.

A 1958 performance from Naples of Verdi's La forza del destino, with Dominguez as Preziosilla, alongside Renata Tebaldi, Ettore Bastianini, Franco Corelli, Boris Christoff, and Renato Capecchi was recorded as DVD.
