= Ebe Stignani =

Italian opera singer

Ebe Stignani (autographed photo)

Ebe Stignani (10 July 1903 – 5 October 1974) was an Italian opera singer, who was pre-eminent in the dramatic mezzo-soprano roles of the Italian repertoire during a stage career of more than thirty years.

== Career ==
Ebe Stignani as Amneris in Aida, Teatro alla Scala, Milan

Ebe Stignani as Santuzza in Cavalleria rusticana, Teatro alla Scala

Born in Naples in 1903 (some sources cite her year of birth as 1904), Stignani studied music for five years at the San Pietro a Majella Conservatory in Naples, including piano and composition as well as singing. The date of her singing début is usually said to have been in 1925 at the San Carlo opera house in Naples, in the role of Amneris in Verdi's Aida, but there is evidence that she may have sung a number of roles in the previous year. In 1926, she was invited to La Scala Milan by Arturo Toscanini to sing the part of Princess Eboli in Verdi's Don Carlos, and Milan continued to be a principal stage for her during the rest of her career. She sang all of the major Italian mezzo-soprano roles, but also tackled Wagner's Ortrud (Lohengrin) and Brangäne (Tristan und Isolde), and Saint-Saëns's Dalila (Samson et Dalila) conducted by Victor de Sabata.

She appeared with the San Francisco Opera in 1938 and again in 1948 but never at the Metropolitan Opera in New York. She toured extensively in North America in the years after World War II. Her first appearance at Covent Garden was in 1937, as Amneris, and she returned to London a number of times, notably in the role of Adalgisa in partnership with Maria Callas's Norma in 1952 and 1957. In the second of the two 1957 performances the thunderous and sustained applause after the duet Mira O Norma led conductor John Pritchard to encore that last part, apparently the only time she ever sang an encore in opera in her career. She also appeared frequently in South America, including the Teatro Colón in Buenos Aires, and in many other European cities outside Italy including Paris, Madrid, and Berlin (where she sang in 1933, 1937 and 1941). Among the new roles which she created during her career were Cathos in Felice Lattuada's Le preziose ridicole (1929), and La Voce in Respighi's Lucrezia (1937).

She retired from the stage in 1958 after appearances in London (as Azucena) and in Dublin (as Amneris). Thereafter, she lived quietly in retirement at her home in Imola. She had married in 1941 and given birth to a son in 1944.

Stignani's voice was large and rich in tone, if sometimes hard-edged, and evenly balanced throughout its considerable range (extending from a low F to a high C). It had sufficient flexibility for her to undertake such roles as Rossini's L'italiana in Algeri, but it was in noble, dramatic parts that she was heard to greatest effect. Critics often referred to the grandeur of her performances. By her own account, she was short and plump, and she admitted her shortcomings as an actress, but she achieved dramatic power and characterization through the quality of her voice and technique. She knew her priorities: speaking to Lanfranco Rasponi, she said, "I was given a magnificent gift, and in a way I am like a priestess, for I feel that it is my responsibility to keep the flame lit in the best possible manner... I am Stignani because of my voice". She was highly disciplined in her choice of roles and in the number of appearances she made, refusing to take assignments which she felt were not right for her voice, and this no doubt contributed to the longevity of her career at the highest level.

== Recordings ==
Stignani recorded a range of operatic arias in the late 1930s and early 1940s reflecting the variety of roles in her repertoire, and these have been variously reissued on CD.

Among her recordings of complete operas/oratorios are:

- Ponchielli: La Gioconda, (conducted by Lorenzo Molajoli), recorded 1931, Italian Columbia (role of Laura), with Giannina Arangi-Lombardi.
- Verdi: Messa da Requiem, (conducted by Tullio Serafin), recorded 1939, with Maria Caniglia, Beniamino Gigli and Ezio Pinza.
- Verdi: La forza del destino, (conducted by Gino Marinuzzi), recorded 1941, (role of Preziosilla) with Maria Caniglia.
- Verdi: Aida, (conducted by Tullio Serafin), recorded 1946, (role of Amneris) with Maria Caniglia and Beniamino Gigli.
- Bizet: Carmen, (conducted by Vincenzo Bellezza), recorded live 1949, (role of Carmen); [described by John Steane as "truly dreadful", (Gramophone May 2000)] with Beniamino Gigli.
- Verdi: Aida (conducted by Alberto Erede), recorded 1952 for English Decca, (role of Amneris), with Renata Tebaldi and Mario Del Monaco.
- Verdi: Il trovatore, (conducted by Antonino Votto), recorded live 1953, Teatro alla Scala, Milan, (role of Azucena), with Maria Callas, Gino Penno.
- Spontini: La Vestale, (conducted by Antonino Votto), recorded live 1954, in Italian, at Teatro alla Scala, Milan, (role of La Gran Vestale), with Maria Callas, Franco Corelli.
- Bellini: Norma, (conducted by Tullio Serafin), recorded 1954, (role of Adalgisa). This was the first of Maria Callas's two studio recordings of Norma; at this stage of her career Stignani may sound unduly mature as the young priestess, but the voice is still rich and resolute. There is also a live recording of the celebrated 1952 Covent Garden production of Norma, conducted by Vittorio Gui, again with Callas, and rated by some reviewers more highly than the studio recording.

== Bibliography ==
- Celletti, R. [1964]. Le grandi voci (Roma: Istituto per la collaborazione culturale).
- Davidson, E. [1971]. "All about Ebe", Opera News, xxxv/21 (1971), p. 28.
- De Franceschi, Bruno, and Pier Fernando Mondini. [1980]. Ebe Stignani: una voce e il suo mondo. (Imola: Grafiche Galeati).
- Rasponi, Lanfranco. [1982]. The last prima donnas. (New York, Knopf).
