= Maria Caniglia =

Italian opera singer

- Maria Caniglia (photo with dedication)
- Occupation: opera soprano singer
- Years active: 1930-1940s

Maria Caniglia (5 May 1905 – 16 April 1979) was one of the leading Italian spinto sopranos of the 1930s and 1940s.

== Life and career ==
Maria Caniglia as Amelia in Un ballo in maschera.

Caniglia was born in Naples and studied at the Music Conservatories of Naples with Agostino Roche. She made her professional debut in Turin as Chrysothemis in Elektra in 1930. The same year she sang Magda in Respighi's La campana sommersa in Geneva and Elsa in Wagner's Lohengrin in Rome and made her debut at La Scala in Milan as Maria in Pizzetti's Lo straniero. She sang regularly at La Scala until 1951 in the leading dramatic soprano roles in opera, such as Un ballo in maschera, La forza del destino, Aida, Andrea Chénier, Tosca and Adriana Lecouvreur. She was particularly successful in roles from the latter verismo school.

On the international scene, Caniglia appeared in venues such as the Palais Garnier, Covent Garden, and the Teatro Colón. She made her debut at the Metropolitan Opera in New York City on 21 November 1938 as Desdemona in Otello.

Caniglia participated in the exhumation of a few long-forgotten operas such as Donizetti's Poliuto and Verdi's Oberto. She also participated in the creation of many contemporary works: Manuela in Montemezzi's La notte di Zoraima, Milan, 1931, Rosanna in Alfano's Cyrano de Bergerac, Rome, 1936, and the title role of Respighi's Lucrezia, Rome, 1937.

Caniglia regularly worked with the greatest conductors and singers, and left recordings of some of her great roles, notably Un ballo in maschera, and Aida (conducted by Tullio Serafin), Andrea Chénier and Tosca (conducted by Oliviero De Fabritiis), all opposite tenor Beniamino Gigli; La forza del destino (cond. Gino Marinuzzi), Don Carlo, Fedora and Zandonai's Francesca da Rimini, this last conducted by Antonio Guarnieri.

Caniglia was married in 1939 to Italian composer Pino Donati (1907–1975), who was also music director of the Verona Arena, the Teatro Comunale di Bologna, and the Chicago Lyric Opera. She died in Rome, aged 73.

Maria Caniglia as Leonora in Il Trovatore, Teatro alla Scala, 1939-1940

Maria Caniglia in Aida, Teatro alla Scala, 1940-1941

Maria Caniglia as Margherita in Mefistofele, Teatro alla Scala
