= Tancredi Pasero =

Italian opera singer

- Tancredi Pasero (photo with 1944 dedication)

Background information
- Born: Tancredi Pasero; 11 January 1893
- Died: 17 February 1983 (aged 90)
- Genres: Opera
- Occupation: Singer
- Years active: 1917–1950

Tancredi Pasero (11 January 1893 in Turin – 17 February 1983 in Milan) was an Italian bass who enjoyed a long and distinguished singing career in his native country and abroad.

== Career and recordings ==
Tancredi Pasero as Basilio in Il barbiere di Siviglia, Teatro alla Scala, Milan, 1941

After studying with the baritone Arturo Pessina in Turin, Pasero made his debut there, during 1917, as Ramphis in Verdi's Aida—although he always considered his official operatic debut to have taken place in Vicenza, on 15 December 1918, as Rodolfo in Vincenzo Bellini's La sonnambula.

According to The Concise Oxford Dictionary of Opera, Pasero went on to make guest appearances in London, Paris, Barcelona, Berlin, Hamburg, Brussels, Buenos Aires and New York City.

La Scala, Milan, where he made his debut in 1926, would become his main artistic home, but American audiences did get to hear him from 1929 until 1933, when he sang at the Metropolitan Opera. His roles at the Met included Oroveso, Raimondo, Ferrando, Fiesco, Padre Guardiano and Alvise. A performance of Don Giovanni with Pasero singing Leporello and Ezio Pinza singing the Don was broadcast in 1932. Unfortunately, no recording exists of this performance.

Pasero notably sang the role The Miller in the world premiere of Umberto Giordano's Il re on 12 January 1929 at La Scala. He also enjoyed considerable success in such Wagner roles (sung in Italian) as Heinrich, Marke, Pogner, Hagen, Gurnemanz. Pasero appeared, too, in the title part in Modest Mussorgsky's Boris and participated in the first performances of several other operas, notably, Mascagni's Nerone, in Milan, and Pizzetti's Orseolo, in Florence.

In 1950, when only 58, Pasero abandoned the stage.

Pasero was widely regarded as having one of the finest basso voices of his era, ranking on a par with those of his acclaimed compatriots Fernando Autori, Nazzareno De Angelis and Ezio Pinza. Indeed, the voice of Pasero closely resembled that of Pinza in terms of its range, size and exceedingly vibrant tonal qualities.

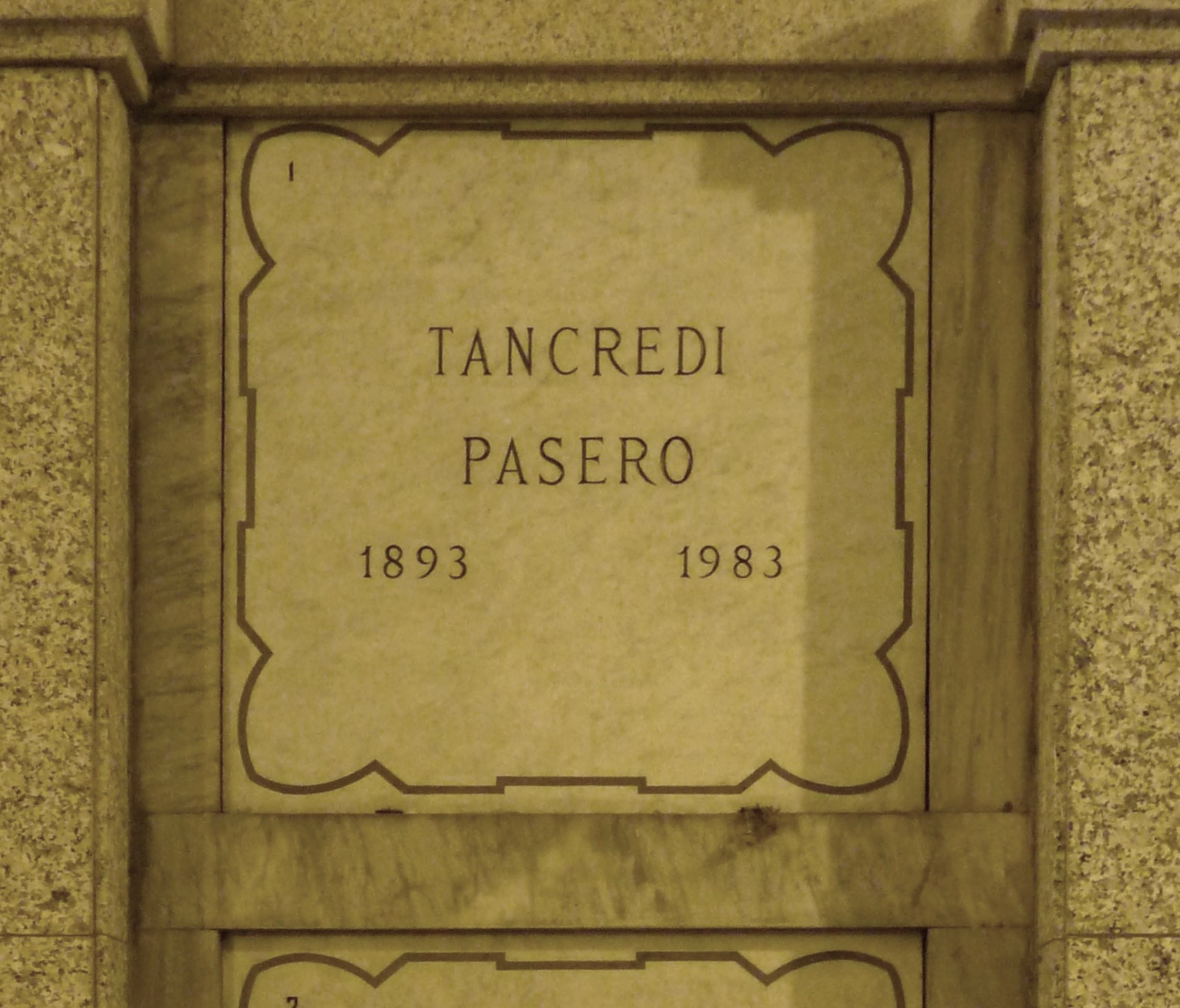
Pasero's grave at the Monumental Cemetery of Milan in 2015

Pasero's reputation for high-quality singing is borne out by his recorded legacy, which includes recordings of five complete works, available on CDs: Norma (recorded in 1937), La forza del destino (1941), Un ballo in maschera (1943) and Aida (1928 & 1946). Also released on CD are extracts from a performance of Aida from 1937; unfortunately, all of Act IV is missing. Also available on CD is a recording of Verdi's Requiem from December 1940, but again only in extracts. During the 1920s, '30s and '40s, he also made many impressive recordings of individual arias from operas by Verdi, Bellini, Donizetti, Ponchielli and several French composers. Made originally for the Fonotipia, Columbia, Cetra and His Master's Voice labels, many of these 78-rpm discs have been re-released on CD in recent times by Preiser and other firms.

After retiring from the stage, Pasero dedicated his time to teaching. Among his pupils was Zdeněk Kroupa. He died in Milan in 1983 at the age of 90 and is buried at the city's Monumental Cemetery.

== Sources ==
- D. Hamilton (ed.),The Metropolitan Opera Encyclopedia: A Complete Guide to the World of Opera (Simon and Schuster, New York 1987). ISBN 0-671-61732-X
- Roland Mancini and Jean-Jacques Rouveroux, (orig. H. Rosenthal and J. Warrack, French edition), Guide de l’opéra, Les indispensables de la musique (Fayard, 1995). ISBN 2-213-59567-4
