= List of operas by Ermanno Wolf-Ferrari =

This is a complete list of operas by Ermanno Wolf-Ferrari (1876–1948).

== List ==
Title	Genre	Subdivisions	Libretto	Première date	Place, theatre
Irene			composer	composed 1895–6, but unperformed	
La Camargo			Maria Pezze-Pascollato, after Alfred de Musset	composed 1897, but unpublished	
Cenerentola (later revised as Aschenbrödel)	fiaba musicale	3 acts	Maria Pezze-Pascollato, after Charles Perrault	22 February 1900	Venice, La Fenice
Le donne curiose (Die neugierigen Frauen)	opera	3 acts	Luigi Sugana, after Carlo Goldoni	27 November 1903	Munich, Residenz
I quatro rusteghi (Die vier Grobiane)	comic opera	3 acts	Luigi Sugana and Giuseppe Pizzolato, after Carlo Goldoni	19 March 1906	Munich, Hoftheater
Il segreto di Susanna (Susannens Geheimnis)	intermezzo	1 act	Enrico Golisciani	4 December 1909	Munich, Hoftheater
I gioielli della Madonna (Der Schmuck der Madonna)	opera	3 acts	Enrico Golisciani and Carlo Zangarini	23 December 1911	Berlin, Kurfürstenoper
L'amore medico (Der Liebhaber als Arzt)	opera	2 acts	Enrico Golisciani, after Molière's L'amour médicin	4 December 1913	Dresden, Hoftheater
Gli amanti sposi	opera giocosa	3 acts	Luigi Sugana, Giuseppe Pizzolato, Enrico Golisciani and Giovacchino Forzano, after Carlo Goldoni's Il ventaglio (1765)	19 February 1925	Venice, La Fenice
Das Himmelskleid (La veste di cielo)	Legende	3 acts	composer, after "Donkeyskin" by Charles Perrault	21 April 1927	Munich, Nationaltheater
Sly	opera	3 acts	Giovacchino Forzano, after Shakespeare's The Taming of the Shrew	29 December 1927	Milan, La Scala
La vedova scaltra	opera	3 acts	Mario Ghisalberti, after Carlo Goldoni	5 March 1931	Rome, Teatro Reale dell'Opera
Il campiello	commedia lirica	3 acts	Mario Ghisalberti, after Carlo Goldoni	12 February 1936	Milan, La Scala
La dama boba	commedia lirica	3 acts	Mario Ghisalberti, after Lope de Vega's play of the same title	1 February 1939	Milan, La Scala
Gli dei a Tebe (Der Kuckuck in Theben)		3 acts	Ludwig Anderson (Ludwig Strecker) and Mario Ghisalberti	4 June 1943	Hanover, Staatsoper
