= Hans-Hermann Nissen =

German opera singer (1893–1980)

Hans-Hermann Nissen (May 20, 1893 - March 28, 1980, Munich) was a German operatic bass-baritone, particularly associated with Wagner roles, one of the leading Wotan and Hans Sachs of the inter-war period.

== Life and career ==
Hans-Hermann Nissen was born in Zippnow on May 20, 1893. He began his professional life as a businessman. He began training as a vocalist in Berlin in 1916 with Julius Raatz-Brockmann.

Nissen began his career as a concert bass-baritone in 1920; spending the next four years performing in oratorios and other works from the concert repertoire. He made his professional opera debut in 1924 at the Volksoper Berlin; portraying Kalif in Der Barbier von Bagdad. He joined the Bavarian State Opera (BSO) in 1925, where he remained until 1967. There he excelled in the operas of Richard Wagner. His Wagner repertoire including the roles of Wolfram von Eschenbach in Tannhäuser, Friedrich of Telramund in Lohengrin, Hans Sachs in Die Meistersinger von Nürnberg, Kurwenal in Tristan und Isolde, Wotan in Die Walküre, and the title role in The Flying Dutchman.

Nissen performed in the world premieres of several operas at the BSO; including Hugo Röhr's Coeur-Dame (1927), Ermanno Wolf-Ferrari's Das Himmelskleid (1927), and Robert Heger's Bettler Namenlos (1932). Other roles in his repertoire with the BSO included Amonasro in Aida, Barak in Die Frau ohne Schatten, Cardinal Carlo Borromeo in Palestrina, Orestes in Elektra, Renato in Un ballo in maschera, and Valentine and Faust.

Nissen also worked as a guest artist with other companies. At the Royal Opera House in London he performed Wotan (1928 and 1934) Hans Sachs (1928). In 1930 he sang Kurwenal for his debut at the Paris Opera, and that same year performed in concert at the Salzburg Festival. He performed in several operas with the Chicago Civic Opera from 1932 through 1932. He performed the part of Hans Sachs at the Salzburg Festival under Arturo Toscanini in 1936-1937, and appeared in multiple role at La Scala from 1936-1938. He appeared at the Metropolitan Opera in 1938-1939 as Wotan, Telramund, and Wolfram. He sang Hans Sachs at the Bayreuth Festival in 1943. He also sang as a guest artist at La Monnaie, the Liceu, the Royal Swedish Opera, Vienna State Opera, and the Vlaamse Opera.

Hans-Hermann Nissen died in Munich on March 28, 1980.
