= Frontini =

Frontini is an Italian surname. Notable people with the surname include:

- Carlos Esteban Frontini (born 1981), Argentine footballer
- Francesco Paolo Frontini (1860–1939), Italian classical composer
- Martino Frontini (1827–1909), Italian composer
- Pablo Frontini (born 1984), Argentine footballer
