= Dell'Orefice =

Dell'Orefice may refer to:

- Carmen Dell'Orefice, American model and actress.
- Giuseppe Dell'Orefice, Italian composer.
- La bottega dell'orefice, a 1988 Italian-Austrian-Canadian-German drama film.
