= Enrico Golisciani =

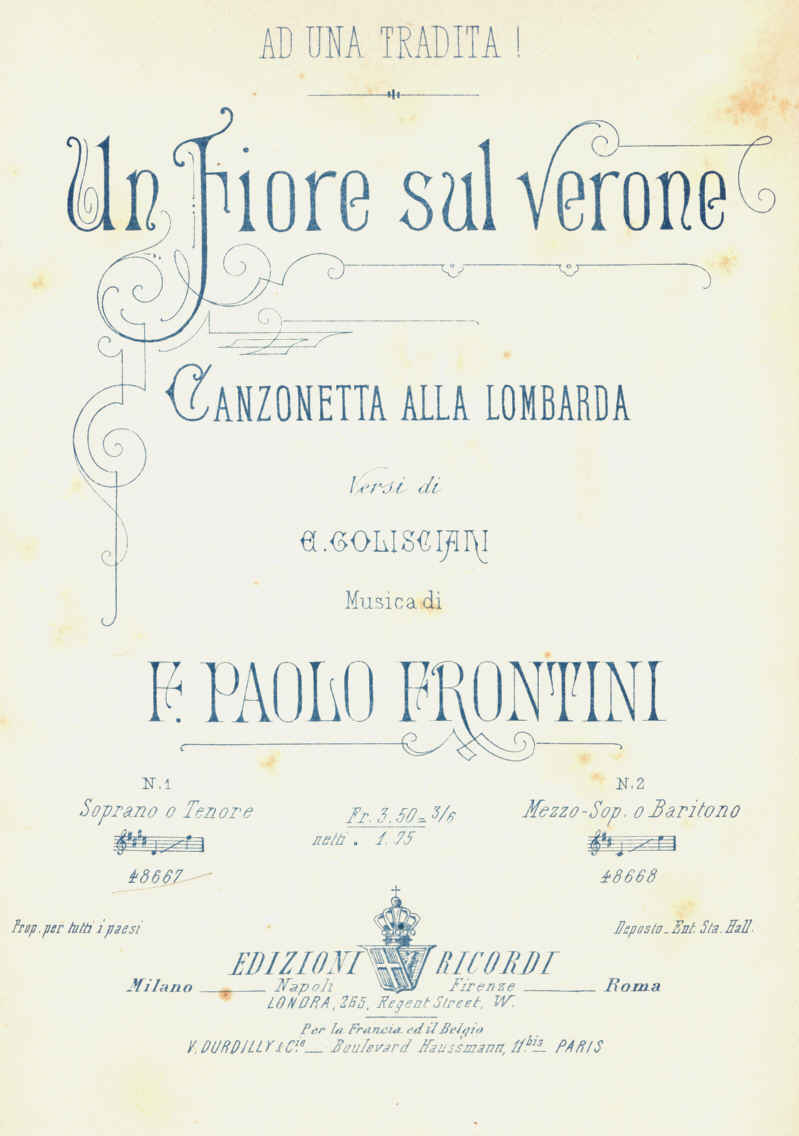
Ed. Ricordi 1883, musica di Francesco Paolo Frontini

Enrico Golisciani (25 December 1848 – 6 February 1918) was an Italian author, born in Naples. He is best known for his opera librettos, but also published a slim volume of verses for music, entitled Pagine d'Album (Milano, Ricordi, 1885); many more of his poems intended to be set to music were published in the Gazzetta Musicale di Milano.

== Librettos ==
The following table contains the list of opera librettos written by Enrico Golisciani.

Title	Genre	Subdivisions	Music	Première	Place, theatre
Un matrimonio nella luna	Bizzarria comico-lirica	3 acts	Ferdinando Bonamici	1871	Naples, Teatro Mercadante
Camoens	Dramma lirico	4 acts	Pietro Musone	18 September 1872	Naples, Teatro Mercadante
La Fiammina	Commedia lirica	3 acts	Vincenzo Magnetta	1873	Naples
Rosetta la giardiniera	Commedia lirica	3 acts	Giovanni Avolio	1873	Naples
Wallenstein	Dramma lirico	4 acts	Pietro Musone	19 August 1873	Naples, Teatro Mercadante
Naso il montanaro			L. Caracciolo	1874	Bari
Maria Stuart	Dramma lirico	3 acts	Costantino Palumbo	23 April 1874	Naples, Teatro di San Carlo
La fata	Melodramma romantico	2 acts	Giorgio Miceli	1875	Naples
Mamma Angot al serraglio di Costantinopoli	Opretta comica	3 acts	Leopoldo Mugnone	1875	Naples
Maria e Fernanda	Dramma lirico	3 acts	Ferruccio Ferrari	1875	
Il pipistrello (Translation from Die Fledermaus for Johann Strauss II)	Opera comica		Nicola De Giosa	28 January 1875	Naples, Teatro Vincenzo Bellini
Don Bizzarro e le sue figlie	opera comica	1 act	Leopoldo Mugnone	20 April 1875	Naples, Teatro Nuovo
Cuor di marinaro			Carlo Sessa	1876	Reggio Emilia
Carlo di Borgogna			Pietro Musone	22 March 1876	Naples, Teatro di San Carlo
Le nozze di Giannetta			Victor Massé	1877	Naples
Gli equivoci	Opera comica	3 acts	Enrico Sarria	17 February 1878	Naples, Teatro Nuovo
Griselda, o La marchesa di Saluzzo	Opera semiseria	3 acts	Oronzo Mario Scarano	6 January 1878	Naples, Teatro Nuovo
Lida Wilson	Melodramma	3 acts	Ferdinando Bonamici	31 January 1878	Pisa, Teatro Nuovo
Il conte di San Romano	Dramma lirico	4 acts	Nicola De Giosa	12 May 1878	Naples, Teatro Vincenzo Bellini
Gabriella Candiano	Dramma lirico	4 acts	Augusto Moroder	25 May 1878	Milan, Teatro Dal Verme
Griselda	Opera	4 acts	Giulio Cottrau	25 September 1878	Turin, Teatro Alfieri
Ginevra di Monreale	Opera seria	4 acts	Costantino Parravano	18 November 1878	Milan, Teatro Dal Verme
Il segreto della duchessa			Giuseppe Dell'Orefice	1879	Naples
Il ritratto di Perla	Idillio lirico	2 acts	Cesare Rossi	7 January 1879	Naples, Circolo Unione
Cleopatra	Opera-ballo	4 acts	Ferdinando Bonamici	8 February 1878	Venice, Teatro la Fenice
Un bagno freddo	Operetta		Camillo De Nardis	24 February 1879	Naples, Real Collegio di Musica
Il Savoiardo			Vincenzo Galassi	1880	Naples
Sogno d'amore	Opera semiseria		Cesare Bellini	12 January 1880	Naples, Casino dell'Unione
I cavalieri di Malta	Dramma lirico	4 (prologue and 3 acts)	Antonio Nani	16 January 1880	Valletta, Royal Theatre
Duca e paggio	Operetta		Giovanni Gnarro	28 February 1880	Naples, Collegio di Musica
L'alpigiana	Opera semiseria		Nicola Cassano	23 March 1880	Naples, Real Collegio di Musica
I guanti gialli			Nicola Spinelli	1881	Naples
Guerra alle donne			A. Falconi	1881	Naples
Nella			Francesco Paolo Frontini	31 March 1881	Catania, Teatro Comunale
Rabagas	Opera comica	4 acts	Nicola De Giosa	23 March 1882	Rome, Teatro Argentina
Margherita di Borgogna	Melodramma tragico	4 (prologue and 3 acts)	Clemente Falcon	10 February 1884	Casale Monferrato, Teatro Politeama
La moglie rapita	Opera buffa		Riccardo Drigo	22 February1884	Saint Petersburg, Ermitage
Cordelia dei Neri	Leggenda lirica	3 acts	Ferdinando Aldieri	9 May 1884	Valletta, Royal Theatre
Re Manfredi	Dramma lirico	4 acts	Carlo Sessa	23 July 1884	Milan, Teatro Dal Verme
Bianca	Dramma lirico	4 acts	Pierantonio Tasca	11 February 1885	Florence, Teatro della Pergola
Marion Delorme	Melodramma	4 acts	Amilcare Ponchielli	17 March 1885	Milan, Teatro alla Scala
Una notte a Venezia	Melodramma romantico		Francesco Avallone	16 May 1885	Salerno, Teatro Municipale
Etelkà	Leggenda lirica	2 acts	Crescenzo Buongiorno	1886	Naples
Il testamento di zio Saverio	Operetta comica	2 acts	Vincenzo Galassi	1886	Naples
Lokinvar (Lochinvar)	Idillio romantico	4 acts	R.F. Kelli	25 January 1887	Salerno, Teatro Municipale
Ivanhoe	Melodramma	4 acts	Attilio Ciardi	1888	Prato
Marina	Melodramma	1 act	Umberto Giordano	1888	Composed in 1888, but nperformed
Agnese Visconti	Dramma lirico	4 acts	Antonio Nani	18 January 1889	Valletta, Royal Theatre
Gina	Melodramma idillico	3 acts	Francesco Cilea	9 February 1889	Naples, Teatrino del Conservatorio San Pietro a Majella
Ginevra di Monreale	Dramma lirico	4 acts	Giuseppe E. Bonavia	22 April 1889	Valletta, Royal Theatre
Bianca di Navarra (Bianca di Nevers)	Dramma lirico	4 (prologue and 3 acts)	Adolfo Baci	1 November 1889	Rovigo
La regina di Toinon	Opera comica	2 acts	Federico Anacarsi Prestreau	1890	Naples
Amor la vince	Opera comica	3 acts	Vincenzo Galassi	4 December 1890	Naples, Teatro Vincenzo Bellini
Biondino			Crescenzo Buongiorno	1891	Naples
Il diavolo zoppo			Crescenzo Buongiorno	1891	Naples
Erebo	Dramma lirico	3 acts	G. Giannetti	1891	Naples
Lilì			Riccardo Matini	1891	Florence
Sara la trovatella	Dramma lirico	3 acts	Francesco Luigi Bianco	7 March 1892	Gallipoli, Teatro Municipale
Cimbelino (Una notte a Venezia)	Dramma lirico	4 acts	Nicola van Westerhout	7 April 1892	Rome, Teatro Argentina
Vendetta abruzzese	Dramma lirico	1 act	Giulio Tanara	28 May 1892	Turin, Teatro Scribe
Il birichino	Schizzo drammatico	1 act	Leopoldo Mugnone	11 August 1892	Venice, Teatro Malibran
Colón en Santo Domingo (Cristoforo Colombo a S. Domingo)	Opera seria	1 act	Julio Morales	12 October 1892	Mexico City, Teatro Nacional
A Santa Lucia	Dramma lirico	2 acts	Pierantonio Tasca	16 November 1892	Berlin, Neues Königliches Opernhaus
Etelinda			Mildred Jessup	1894	Florence
Teresa Raquin	Dramma musicale	2 acts	E. Coop	1894	Naples
Dea	Opera	4 acts	Pollione Ronzi	4 August 1894	Siena, Lizza
Eros (In collaboration with Gemma Bellincioni)	Melodramma	4 acts	Nicolò Massa	1895	Florence
Le baruffe chiozzotte	Commedia musicale	2 acts	Tommaso Benvenuti	30 January 1895	Florence, Teatro Pagliano
La festa della messe			Crescenzo Buongiorno	1896	Leipzig
La pupilla			G. Gialdini	1896	Trieste
Wanda	Dramma lirico	2 acts	Romolo Bacchini	1896	Fermo
La sorella di Mark (In collaboration with Gemma Bellincioni)	Idillio drammatico	3 acts	Giacomo Setaccioli	6 May 1896	Rome, Teatro Costanzi
Max	Opera seria	2 acts	Mary Rosselli Nissim and Giuseppe Menichetti	27 February 1898	Florence, Teatro Pagliano
Rolla (Luigi Rolla)	Opera seria	1 acts	Gennaro Scognamiglio	27 January 1899	Naples, Teatro Vincenzo Bellini
La moretta	Opera	1 act	Alfredo Fimiani	16 February 1900	Naples, Teatro Mercadante
Atal-Kar	Opera	4 acts	Cesare Dall'Olio	14 December 1900	Turin, Teatro Balbo
Daniella	Opera	2 acts	Mariano Marzano	31 May 1901	Caserta, Teatro Cimarosa
La sirena	Opera	2 acts	Adolfo Baci	22 February 1903	Venice, Teatro Rossini
Vigilia di nozze	Opera	3 acts	Teofilo De Angelis	12 September 1903	Perugia, Teatro Morlacchi
Alba	Novella lirica	4 acts	Teofilo De Angelis		Unperformed
Manuel Garcia	Melodramma	4 acts	Leopoldo Tarantini	1904	Naples
Vita bretone	Opera	3 acts	Leopoldo Mugnone	14 March 1905	Naples, Teatro di San Carlo
Iglesias (Cuore sardo)	Dramma lirico	1 act	Vittorio Baravalle	1907	Turin
La borghesina	Commedia lirica	4 acts	Augusto Machado	1909	Lisbon
Il segreto di Susanna ("Susannes Geheimnis")	Intermezzo	1 act	Ermanno Wolf-Ferrari	4 December 1909	Munich, Residenztheater (Hoftheater) am Salvatorplatz
Maritana			Gaetano Tarantini	1911	Bari
I gioielli della Madonna (Der Schmuk der Madonna) (In collaboration with Carlo Zangarini)	Opera	3 acts	Ermanno Wolf-Ferrari	23 December 1911	Berlin, Kurfürstenoper Berlin
Antony	Melodramma	3 acts	Riccardo Casalaina	1912	Parma
La Du Barry	Melodramma	4 (3 acts and epilogue)	Ezio Camussi	7 November 1912	Milan, Teatro Lirico
L'amore medico (Der Liebhaber als Arzt)	Commedia musicale	2 acts	Ermanno Wolf-Ferrari	4 December 1913	Dresden, Semperoper
Giordano			Luigi Vella	1914	Valletta. Partial performance
Champagna club			Alberto Curci	1916	Naples
Lulù e Ninì			Mariano Marzano	1916	Caserta
Notte nuziale			Luigi Vella	1917	Unperformed
Il candeliere			Ferruccio Ferrari	1917	Turin
I carbonari			Paolo Vella	1920	Unperformed
Donna Rios			Adriano Ceccarini	1920	Viterbo
Il garofano bianco			Riccardo Drigo	1929	Padua

== Poems set to music ==
Romances:

- Preso a morte, words by E. Golisciani, music by Francesco Paolo Frontini, Maddaloni, 1878
- Abbandonata, words by E. Golisciani, music by Francesco Paolo Frontini, Ricordi, 1878
- Biglietto amoroso, words by E. Golisciani, music by Francesco Paolo Frontini, Benenati, 1878
- Non sei più tu, words by E. Golisciani, music by Francesco Paolo Frontini, Benenati, 1878
- Un fiore sul verone , words by Enrico Golisciani, music by Francesco Paolo Frontini, Ricordi, 1883
