= Tommaso Benvenuti =

Tommaso Benvenuti may refer to:

- Tommaso Benvenuti (rugby union) (born 1990), Italian rugby player
- Tommaso Benvenuti (footballer) (born 2006), Sammarinese footballer

== See also ==
- Tomaso Benvenuti (1838–1906), Italian opera composer
