= Tomaso Benvenuti =

Italian composer of opera

Tomaso Benvenuti (also spelled Tommasso and Tommaso; 4 February 1838 – 26 February 1906) was a nineteenth-century Italian composer of opera. He was born in Cavarzere in the Veneto (at the time part of the Austrian Empire) and died in Rome at the age of 68.

== Works ==
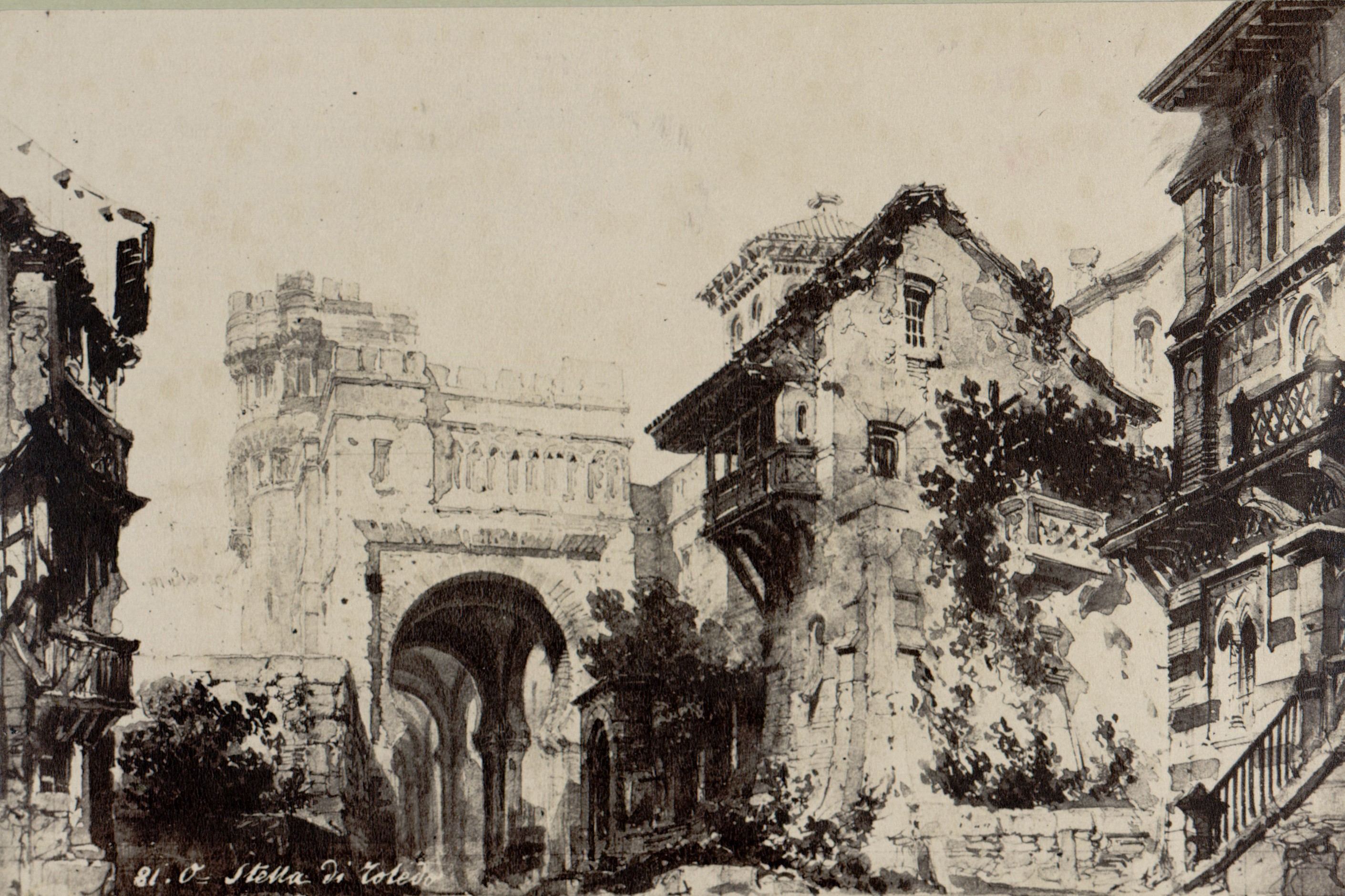
Piazza presso una porta di Toledo, set design for La stella di Toledo (1864).

Benvenuti is known to have written the following seven operas:

- Valenzia Candiano, an azione lirica, 1856. The librettist is unknown, as is the place, if there was one, of the first performance. A libretto published in Mantua in 1856, however, does include other details of what may have been the first production. From the character list it appears the opera was adapted from Valenzia Candiano, o, La figlia dell'ammiraglio, an historical novel published in 1843 by the Milanese writer Giuseppe Rovani.
- Adriana, or Adriana Lecouvreur, a dramma lirico in 4 acts, 1857. The libretto by Leone Fortis was adapted from the play Adrienne Lecouvreur by Eugène Scribe and Ernest-Wilfrid Legouvé, which would later form the basis for Francesco Cilea's opera Adriana Lecouvreur. The opera's first performance was on 26 November 1857 at the Teatro della Canobbiana, Milan.
- Guglielmo Shakspeare (i.e. William Shakespeare), a melodramma in 5 acts, 1861. The opera, with a libretto by Francesco Maria Piave, was first performed on 14 February 1861 during the Carneval season at the Teatro Regio di Parma.
- La stella di Toledo, a melodramma in 3 acts, 1864. The libretto is by Antonio Ghislanzoni, after Casimir Delavigne's Don Giovanni d'Austria which, in 1847, had been the basis for Don John of Austria, the first Australian opera. The first performance was on 23 April 1864 in Milan.
- Il falconiere, 1878, a dramma lirico in 3 acts. Leopoldo Marenco's libretto, based on the legend of Adelasia and Aleramo, would later be used for the Sicilian composer Paolo Frontini's 1899 opera of the same name. Benvenuti's work premiered on 16 February 1878 in Venice.
- Beatrice di Svevia (i.e. Elisabeth of Hohenstaufen), an azione melodrammatica in 4 acts, 1890. The librettist is unknown; the first performance was on 20 February 1890 in Venice.
- Le baruffe Chiozzotte, a commedia musicale in 2 acts, 1895. The librettist for this version of Carlo Goldoni's Venetian comedy was Enrico Golisciani; the work's premiere was on 30 January 1895 in Florence.
