= Antonino Russo Giusti =

Antonino Russo Giusti (23 February 1876, in Catania – 28 September 1957) was an Italian dramatist.

After passing his youth in Belpasso, Giusti studied the classics at Catania.

He then took before his diploma in jurisprudence, upon completion of which he dedicated himself to forensics. He eventually became artistic director of the communal theatre in Catania, which showed his first work in the Sicilian language, L'eredità dello zio canonico; this was followed in 1920 by U Spirdu, with music by Francesco Paolo Frontini conducted by Gaetano Emanuel Calì.

In 1923, Tommaso Marcellini showed L'eredita dello zio canonico on the Italian mainland for the first time; it was performed at the communal theatre of Trapani under its Sicilian title, U tistamentu di lu ziu canonicu. Marcellini later showed another one of Giusti's plays, Il biberon di papà, giving it the Sicilian title of A sucarola du papà.

Among Giusti's other plays was Un autore di assalto, a comedy that some branded Pirandellian. He authored a total of 27 plays over the course of his career.

Angelo Musco acquired the rights to L'eredita dello zio canonico, playing the protagonist of a film of the same name produced in 1934; he also played the same character in the film Gatta ci cova.

Giusti died in Catania in 1957.
