= Marta Wittkowska =

American opera singer

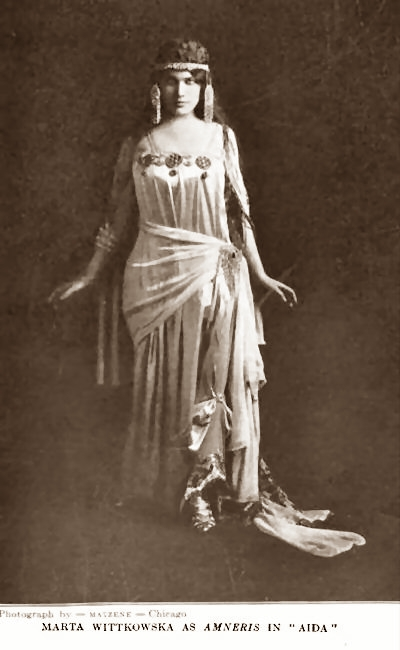
- (Aida c. 1912) The Grand Opera Singers of To-day (1922)
- Born: Martha Paula Wittkowski; January 1, 1882; Danzig-West Prussia (today Gdańsk, Poland)
- Died: May 24, 1977 (aged 95); Madison, New Jersey, U.S.
- Other names: Marta W. Mallery; Marta Paula
- Occupation: Contralto opera singer
- Spouse: Arlington Humphrey Mallery

Marta Wittkowska (January 1, 1882 – May 24, 1977) was a Polish–American contralto opera singer popular during the early decades of the twentieth century.

== Early life ==
Martha Paula Wittkowski was born in the German city of Danzig (present-day Gdańsk, Poland), the second of five children raised by Polish immigrants Joseph and Mathilde Wittkowski, and grew up in Syracuse, New York where her family had lived since she was about eight.

As a young girl she sang in church choirs and at community events. Music professor C. J. Kresser was among the first to realize Wittkowski's potential when he heard her sing at a church function and would serve as her mentor for a number of years. Later Mrs. Edward Joy, the wife of a local businessman, arranged to have Wittkowski attend music classes at the College of Fine Arts at Syracuse University and then study under the soprano Emma Cecilia Thursby in New York City. At a recital organized by Thursby at the Waldorf-Astoria Hotel, Wittkowski's performance so impressed Bessie Oakman, the daughter of former U. S. Senator Roscoe Conkling, that in 1906 she arranged to have the young singer travel abroad to be tutored by the famed Italian baritone, Antonio Cotogni.

Two years earlier, Wittkowski had been given the opportunity to sing in front of the noted contralto Ernestine Schumann-Heink, at the time in Syracuse to perform at a concert. Heink told her that her voice was one of the most promising she had ever heard, and suggested that she study Wagnerian operas at Bayreuth and participate in their annual festival to gain the training and experience not yet available in America; a path that at the time was beyond Wittkowski's means.

== Career ==
As Marta Paula, she made her professional debut in the fall of 1908 in Italy playing rolls such as the Mother in Amilcare Ponchielli's La Gioconda and Maffio Orsini in Gaetano Donizetti's Lucrezia Borgia. Two years later she was engaged at London's Covent Garden Theatre for a season or two before accepting an offer by opera impresario Andreas Dippel to join the Chicago-Philadelphia Grand Opera Company in the fall of 1911.

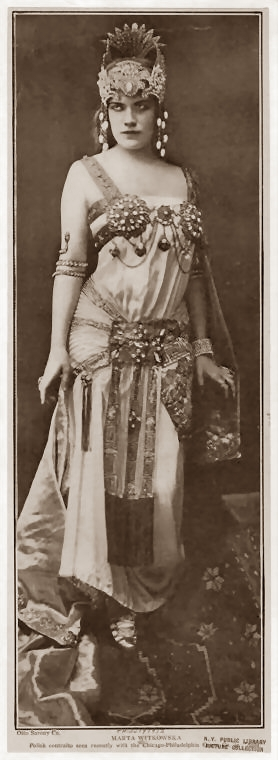
Marta Wittkowska (Aida c. 1912) NYPL Digital Collection

As Marta Wittkowska, she sang for Metropolitan Opera House in Philadelphia, the Met in Manhattan and opera companies in St. Louis, Syracuse, Chicago, Cincinnati and Detroit. In 1913 Wittkowski returned to the Covent Garden Theatre to play the alternate lead in the Raymond Rôze opera Joan of Arc and the Wagnerian roles Isolde and Ortrude.

During her time with the Cincinnati Zoo Opera, Wittkowski opened a studio in 1930 at the Hotel Biltmore in Troy, Ohio, teaching voice culture, opera and opera chorus, and a few years later formed with her husband the Columbus Civic Opera Company at Columbus, Ohio.

== Marriage ==
In 1917, she married Arlington Humphrey Mallery (1877–1968), a civil engineer, a veteran of the Spanish–American War, a one-time Democratic Party candidate for the United States Congress, and president of the Syracuse Bridge Company. In 1903 her husband had designed the swiveling head block or "Mallery Type" transfer bridge for loading or unloading railcars from floats (patent number 743,901). He was the author of Lost America: The Story of the Pre-Columbian Iron Age in America and had once written a thesis on his belief that the Vikings had reached North American some five hundred years in advance of Christopher Columbus and was among the first to speculate on the possible pre-Columbian origins of the 1513 world map created by Hacı Ahmed Muhiddin Piri.

== Later life and death ==
She retired around 1937 to write and translate music and to try her hand as a novelist. Wittkowski died in 1977, aged 95, at Madison, New Jersey and was interred at the Woodlawn National Cemetery in Elmira, New York.

In 1922 the publication The Grand Opera Singers of To-day wrote:

When Mr. Dippel produced " Die Walküre in Chicago in December 1911, a portion of one of the reviews read as follows: "Marta Wittkowski's splendid sonorous tones as Waltraute echoed from the mountain heights soaring superior to the sea of sound in the orchestra."

== Chicago-Philadelphia Grand Opera Company season of 1911–1912 ==
- Role
- Azucena, Il trovatore by Giuseppe Verdi November 4, 1911
- The Witch, Hansel and Gretel by Engelbert Humperdinck November 18, 1911
- Gretel, Hansel and Gretel by Engelbert Humperdinck November 20, 1911
- Poppee, Quo Vadis by Jean Nouguès, December 19, 1911
- Waltraute, Die Walküre by Richard Wagner, December 21, 1911
- Ortrud, Lohengrin by Richard Wagner, January 2, 1912
- Niclaus, The Tales of Hoffmann by Jacques Offenbach, January 19, 1912
- Siebel, Faust by Charles Gounod, March 2, 1912
- Serena, The Jewels of the Madonna by Ermanno Wolf-Ferrari, March 5, 1912
