= Costantino Catena =

Italian classical pianist

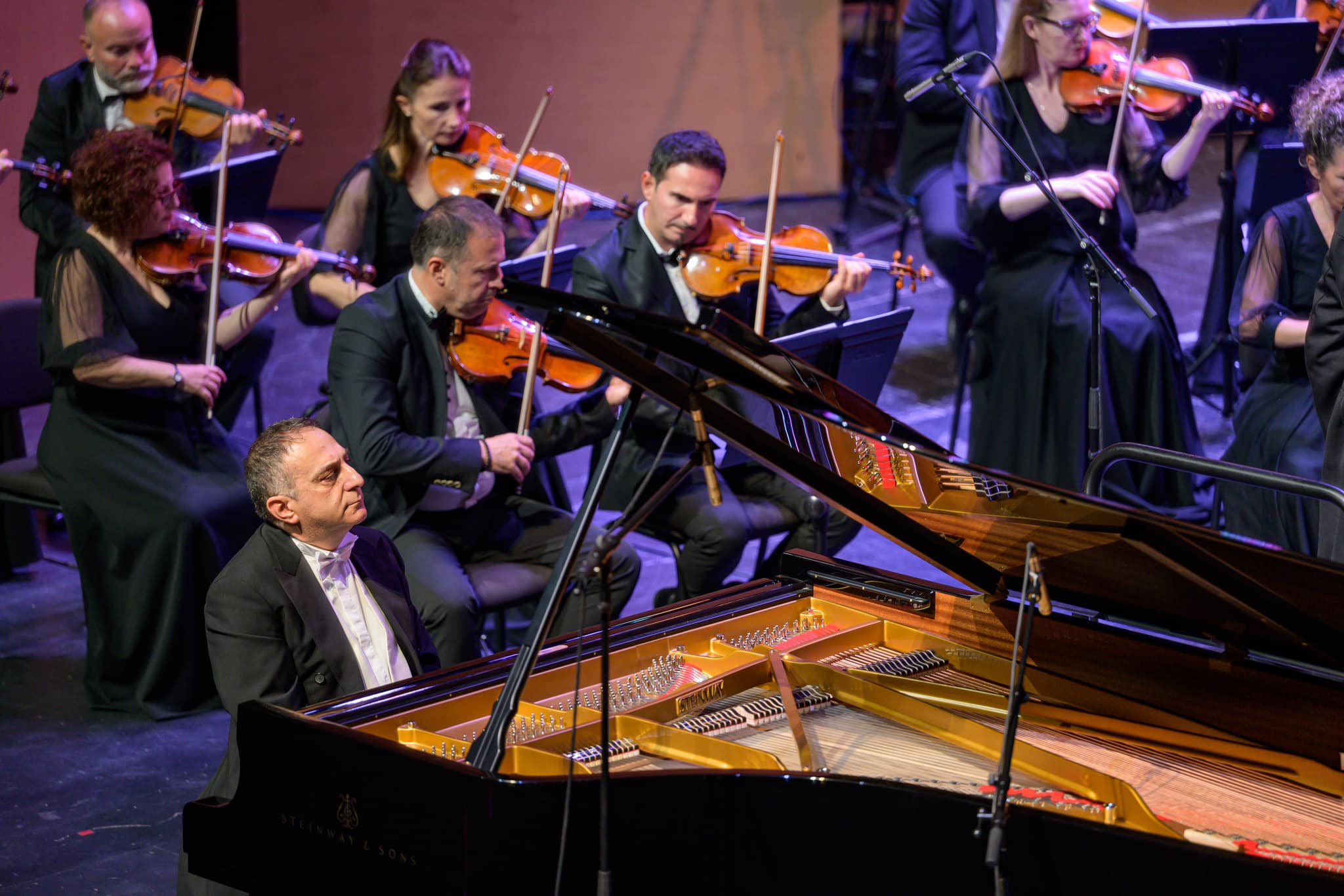
- Catena at National Opera Theatre in Tirana
- Born: 6 April 1969 (age 57); Polla, Italy
- Education: Giuseppe Martucci Conservatoire Salerno University Second University of Naples
- Occupation: pianist
- Years active: 1990–present

Costantino Catena (born 6 April 1969) is an Italian classical pianist.

== Biography and career ==
After graduating from the Giuseppe Martucci Salerno State Conservatoire under the guidance of Luigi D'Ascoli, Costantino Catena continued and completed his piano studies with Konstantin Bogino, Bruno Mezzena, Boris Bechterev and Aldo Ciccolini. He also studied composition, and he graduated in Philosophy at the Salerno University and in Psychology at Second University of Naples.

Among the theatrtes in which he performed: Gasteig of Munich, Saint Petersburg Philharmonia, Moscow Conservatory, Kennedy Center and Georgetown University of Washington, Ravello Festival, Parco della Musica of Rome, Kusatsu Festival (Japan), Ohrid Festival (North Macedonia), Filarmonica de Stat of Cluj-Napoca, Triennale di Milano, Teatro Carlo Goldoni of Livorno, Accademia Filarmonica di Bologna.

He chairs the piano professorship in the Giuseppe Martucci State Conservatoire in Salerno and he is recording artist for Camerata Tokyo since 2010.

Catena is a Yamaha Artist.

== Discography ==
- Piano Classics PCL10305 (2025) Robert Schumann: Novelletten Op.21, Nachtstücke Op.23 (Costantino Catena, piano)
- Camerata Tokyo CMCD-28357 (2019) Robert Schumann: Davidsbündlertänze & Humoreske (Costantino Catena, piano)
- Camerata Tokyo CMCD-15161〜2 (2022) Robert Schumann: Carnaval, Fantasiestücke op. 12 and 111, Kreisleriana, Fantasie (Costantino Catena, piano)
- Camerata Tokyo CMCD-28356 (2018) Dedications—Schumann-Liszt / Costantino Catena plays the new Bösendorfer 280VC
- Brilliant Classics 95868 (2019) Wolf-Ferrari Piano Music (Costantino Catena, piano)
- Brilliant Classics 97268 (2024) Antonio Salieri: Piano Concertos (Costantino Catena, piano – Accademia d'archi Arrigoni – Giulio Arnofi, conductor),
- Brilliant Classics 96652 (2022) Franco Margola: Music for Violin, Piano & Orchestra (Davide Alogna, violin - Costantino Catena, piano - Orchestra Sinfonica di Milano – Pietro Borgonovo, conductor),
- Aulicus Classics ALC 0041 (2020) Fryderyk Chopin: Sonate no. 2 op. 35, Polonaise op. 44, Barcarolle op. 60, Fantaisie op. 49, Barcarolle op. 60 on Fazioli and Erard (Costantino Catena, piano)
- Brilliant Classics 96590 (2022) Wolf-Ferrari Piano Quintet, Cello Sonata, Duo (Costantino Catena, piano – Amedeo Cicchese, cello – Quartetto Guadagnini)
- Brilliant Classics 96093 (2020) Wolf-Ferrari 3 Violin Sonatas (Davide Alogna, violin – Costantino Catena, piano)
- Camerata Tokyo CMBD-80005 (2013) The Sound of the Concert Grand Fazioli F278: Costantino Catena plays Debussy and Schumann
- Camerata Tokyo CMCD-28309 (2014) Richard Strauss and The Piano (Costantino Catena & Quartetto Savinio)
- Camerata Tokyo CMCD-15141〜2 (2 CD, 2016) Franz Liszt: Two Saints (Costantino Catena, piano)
- Suonare Records SNR286 (2021) Franz Schubert: Impromptus D935, Klavierstücke D946, Ländler D790 (Costantino Catena, piano)
- Aulicus Classics ALC 0024 (2019) Johannes Brahms: Sonatas for clarinet and piano op. 120, Trio for clarinet, cello and piano op. 114 (Giovanni Punzi, clarinet – Toke Møldrup, cello – Costantino Catena, piano),
- Camerata Tokyo CMCD-28299 (2014) Franz Liszt: Piano Trios (Costantino Catena, piano – Paolo Franceschini, violin – Claudio Casadei, cello)
- Camerata Tokyo CMCD-28293 (2013) The Hidden Orchestra (Hiromi Okada & Costantino Catena, piano – Claudio Brizi, organ)
- Camerata Tokyo CMCD-99077～8 (2 CD, 2013) Harmonium Pearls (Claudio Brizi, harmonium – Costantino Catena & Carlo Palese, piano)
- Camerata Tokyo CMCD-15133〜4(2 CD, 2012) Franz Liszt: Venezia e Napoli (Costantino Catena, piano)
- Camerata Tokyo CMCD-28320 (2015) Robert Schumann: Piano Quintet op. 44 & Piano Quartet op. 47 (Costantino Catena & Quartetto Savinio)
- Camerata Tokyo CMCD-20109～10 (2 CD, 2011) Franz Liszt: Complete Works for violin and piano (Mauro Tortorelli, violin – Costantino Catena, piano)
- Da Vinci Classics C00015, 0806810877883 (2017) Antonio Salieri: Piano Concertos (Costantino Catena, piano – Orchestra del Conservatorio Domenico Cimarosa di Avellino – Antonio Sinagra, dir)
- Nuova Era International NE-7395(2005) Thalberg/Liszt: Works for violin and piano (Mauro Tortorelli, violin – Costantino Catena, piano)
- Phoenix Classics PH-99512 (1999) Ferenc Liszt: Musica per violino e pianoforte (Mauro Tortorelli, violin – Costantino Catena, piano)
- Camerata Tokyo CMCD-28375 (2020) Erik Satie: 4 Hands (Aki Takahashi – Costantino Catena, piano),
- Camerata Tokyo CMCD-28346 (2017) Franz Schubert: 3 Klavierstücke D 946 & Fantasie D 940 (Aki Takahashi – Costantino Catena, piano),
- Pèlerinage avec Liszt: Années de pèlerinage, Year 2 – Italy, S.161 (Costantino Catena, piano), PLAY & Oracle Records LDT, (2023)
- Oracle Records (2014) The greatest classical piano masterpieces (Costantino Catena, piano)
- Istituto Liszt (2008) Rarità lisztiane (Mauro Tortorelli, violin – Costantino Catena, piano)
