= Mary Rosselli Nissim =

Italian Composer & Musician

Mary Rosselli Nissim (9 June 1864 - 26 September 1937) was an Italian composer, designer and pianist who composed four operas and many songs. She won at least two major awards.

== Life and career ==
Rosselli Nissim was born in Florence to Janet Nathan and Pellegrino Rosselli. She married Cesare Nissim and they had three children. She studied music with her mother and with Giuseppe Menichetti. An accomplished pianist, she accompanied Ubaldo Ceccarelli and other singers in recitals.

In 1896, Rosselli Nissim’s opera Nephta won Honorable Mention at the Vienna Steiner contest. Her work in industrial design won a prize at the 1911 Turin International, an exhibition of industry and work. She died in Viareggio, Italy, in 1937.

Roselli Nissim’s music was published by Carisch and included:

== Opera ==
- Andrea del Sarto (libretto by Antonio Lega after Alfred de Musset)
- Fiamme (libretto by Giovacchino Forzano)
- Max (with Menichetti; libretto by Enrico Goliscian)
- Nephta

== Orchestra ==
- Canzone Anacreontica (bass soloist, chorus, and orchestra)

== Vocal ==
- “Avventuroso Augello” (madrigal)
- “Barcarola”
- “Canzonetta”
- “Cavallino, Scherzetto”
- “Dolce Aprile”
- “Gira la Ruota Come l’Amor”
- “L’homme Beau”
- “Le Gaga”
- “Le Petit Homme Gres”
- “Le Petit Japonais”
- “Voglio Rubare” (madrigal)
