= Martino Frontini =

Italian composer and writer

Martino Frontini (1827–1909) was an Italian composer and writer. He was born and died in Catania, and worked with many Catanian musicians in the second half of the nineteenth century. Frontini was the father, and first teacher, of composer Francesco Paolo Frontini. He founded the town band, which he led for 37 years; he also directed the band of the regional hospital during his career. He composed numerous works, becoming especially known for his waltzes; in larger forms, he wrote a three-act lyric opera (Marco Bozzari), an "azione coreografica" (Fatima) and a fantastic operetta (La Rivolta dell'Olimpo). As a writer he published a biography of Pietro Antonio Coppola in 1876. He died in Catania in 1909.
