= Adelasia =

Adelasia (variant forms include Adelaide, Azalaïs, and Alasia) may refer to:

- Adelaide del Vasto (c. 1075–1118), countess of Sicily and Queen of Jerusalem, wife of Roger I of Sicily
- Azalaïs of Montferrat (died 1232), regent of the Marquisate of Saluzzo
- Adelasia of Torres (1207–1259), Giudice of Logudoro and of Gallura
- The Adelasia who, according to legend, was daughter of Otto I the Great, eloped with Aleramo, and founded Alassio
