= Carolina White =

American actress and opera singer

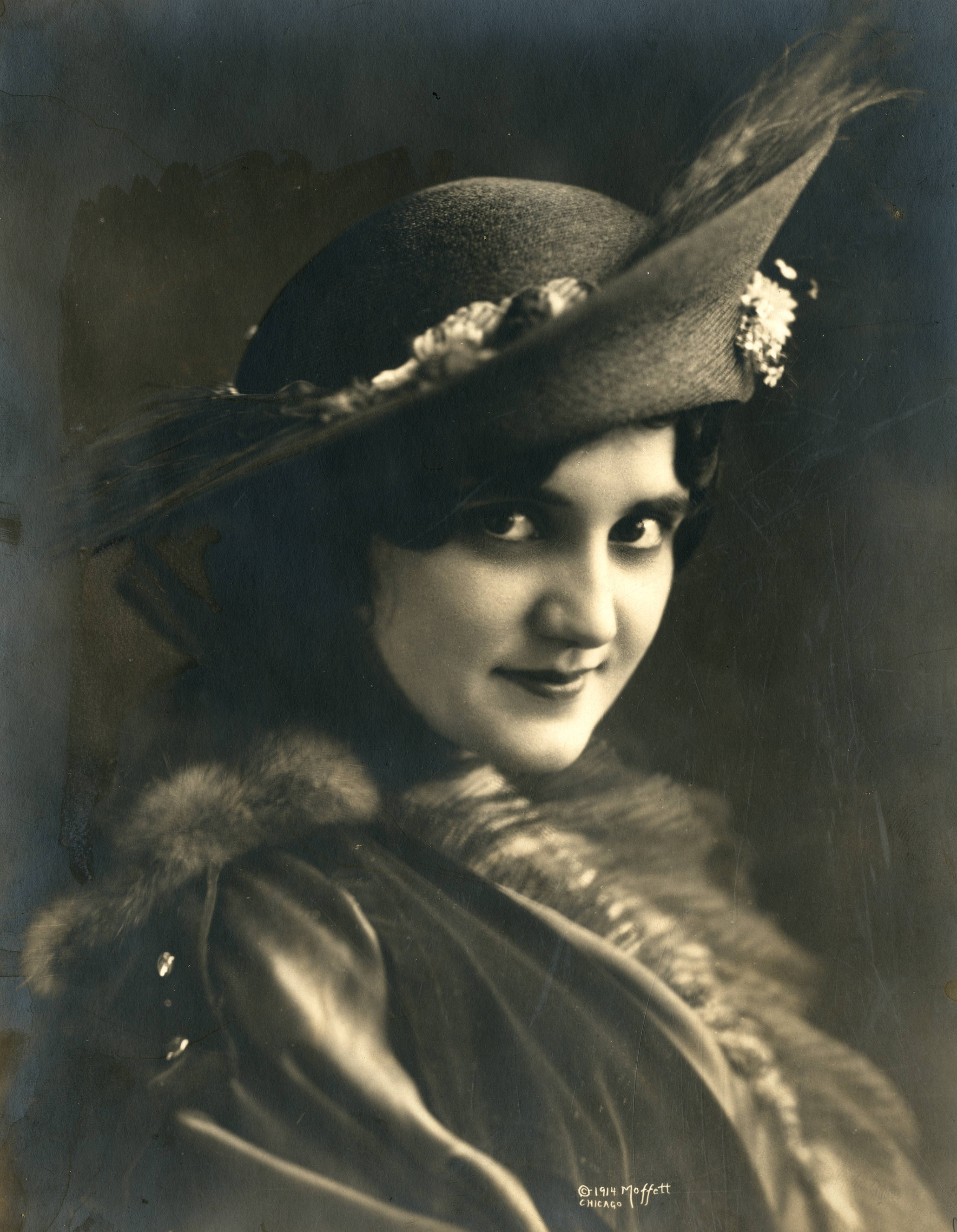
- White in 1915
- Born: May 23, 1886; Boston, Massachusetts, U.S.
- Died: October 5, 1961 (aged 75); Rome, Italy
- Occupations: Operatic soprano; Actress

Carolina White (May 23, 1886 – October 5, 1961) was an American operatic soprano who had an active performance career during the first three decades of the 20th century. After beginning her career as a concert soprano in Boston in 1905, she went to Europe where she established herself as a leading soprano in Italy and Switzerland, beginning at the Teatro di San Carlo in 1908. After appearing in major opera houses like La Scala and La Fenice, White left Europe in 1910 to join the roster of artists at the Chicago Grand Opera Company where she was a leading soprano through 1914. After this she was active primarily as a concert soprano up through 1922. She made several recordings for Columbia Records during the second decade of the 20th century.

In addition to her work as a soprano, White had a brief career as an actress, appearing opposite Enrico Caruso in the silent film My Cousin (1918). Today she is best remembered for performing leading roles in the United States premieres of several operas; including the American premieres of Wolf-Ferrari's Il segreto di Susanna in 1911 and I gioielli della Madonna in 1912, and Leoncavallo's Zingari in 1913. She was also one of the first performers to portray Minnie in Puccini's La fanciulla del West; performing that role shortly after its world premiere in New York in 1910 for that opera's first performances in the cities of Chicago (1910), Milwaukee (1910), and Boston (1911). White was critically successful in many roles. She was particularly admired for her portrayal of the title role in Verdi's Aida.

== Life and career ==
Born in the Dorchester neighborhood of Boston, Massachusetts, White graduated from Brighton High School in her native city at the age of 17. She studied singing in Boston with Weldon Hunt for five years before pursuing further vocal training in Naples, Italy with Frederick Roberti and Carlo Sebastiani. She later studied in that city with the conductor Paolo Longone; ultimately marrying him in 1910.

White began her professional singing career as a concert soprano in Boston in 1905. She made her professional opera debut in 1908 at the Teatro di San Carlo in Naples as Gutrune in Wagner's Götterdämmerung. At that opera house she had further successes in the title role of Verdi's Aida, Santuzza in Mascagni's Cavalleria rusticana, and Margherita in Boito's Mefistofele. Over the next three years she appeared at several more opera houses in Italy, including La Fenice in Venice, La Scala in Milan, and the Teatro Costanzi in Rome; and also performed at the Stadttheater Luzern in Switzerland. Her repertoire in Italy also included the role of Salome in Massenet's Hérodiade and the title roles in Catalani's La Wally, and Puccini's Tosca and Madame Butterfly.

In 1910 White returned to the United States to become a resident artist with the Chicago Grand Opera Company (CGOC); making her debut with the company as Minnie in the Chicago premiere of Puccini's La fanciulla del West. She also sang Minnie for the first performances of La fanciulla del West in the cities of Milwaukee (1910) and Boston (1911); the latter with the Boston Opera Company.

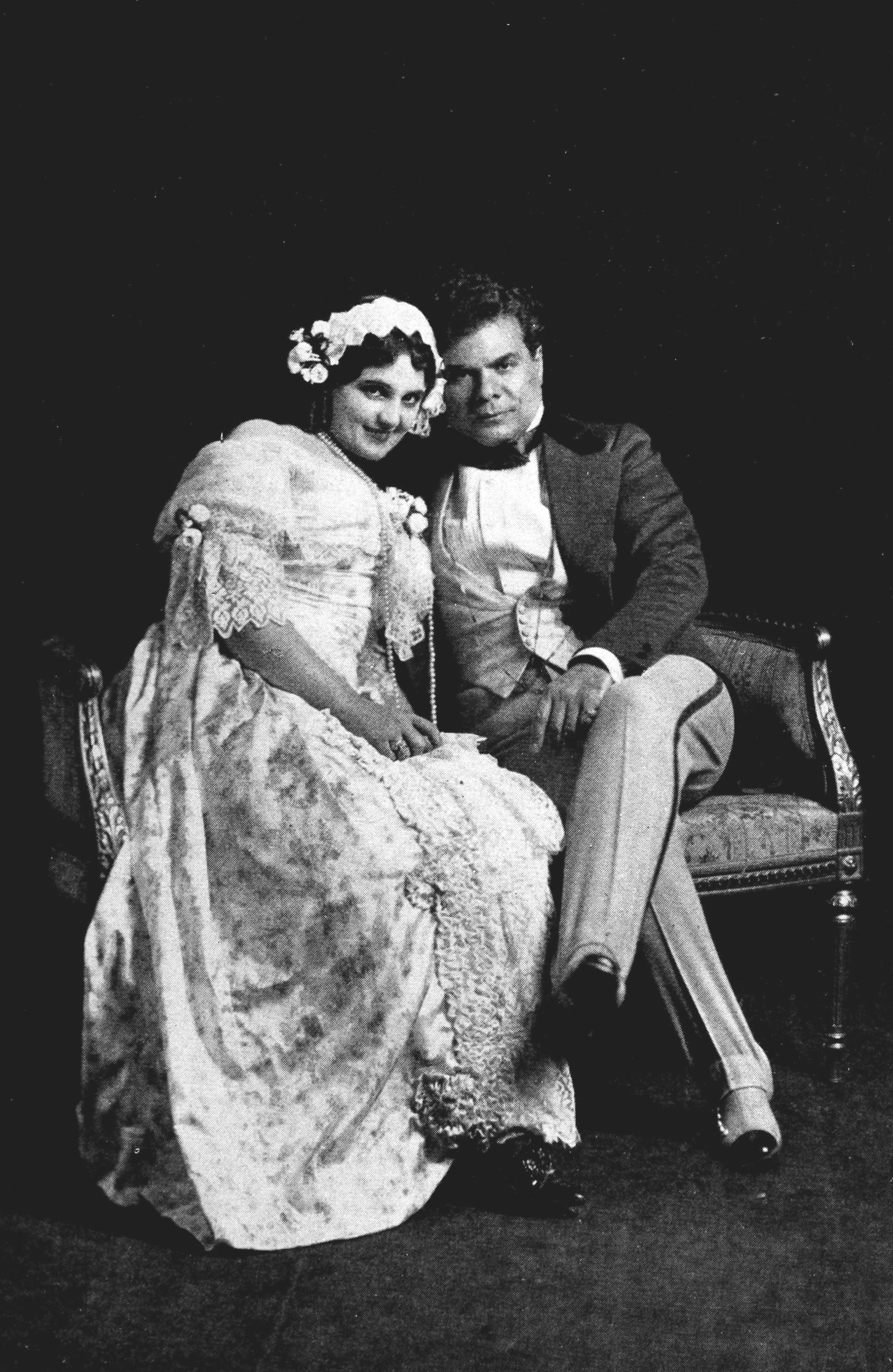
White and Mario Sammarco in the US premiere of Il segreto di Susanna on March 14, 1911, at the old Metropolitan Opera House

White remained with the CGOC for four seasons; making her last appearance with the company in 1914. Highlights of her career with the CGOC included performing the role of Maliella in the United States premiere of I gioielli della Madonna in 1912, and Fleana in the United States premiere of Zingari in 1913. She also appeared with the CGOC (then known as Philadelphia-Chicago Grand Opera Company) in the US premiere of Il segreto di Susanna on March 14, 1911, for an out town engagement at the Metropolitan Opera House in New York. Her other repertoire in Chicago included Barbara de la Guerra in Herbert's Natoma, Mozart's Countess Almaviva in The Marriage of Figaro and Donna Elvira in Don Giovanni, Giulietta in Offenbach's The Tales of Hoffmann, Santuzza, and the title roles in Puccini's Manon Lescaut, Ponchielli's La Gioconda, and Aida; the latter role being the part for which she was best known both in Chicago and in Europe.

After leaving the CGOC in 1914, White was primarily active as a concert singer. In 1917 she performed in operettas in New York City. After her divorce from Paolo Longone in 1922 she ceased performing. She died on October 5, 1961, in Rome.

White made several recordings of both Italian opera arias and English popular songs with Columbia Records during the second decade of the 20th century; some of which were included in EMI's The Record of Singing. In addition to her work as a soprano, White had a brief career as an actress, appearing opposite Enrico Caruso in the silent film My Cousin (1918), one of only two movies the tenor made.
