= My Cousin =

Italian opera singer

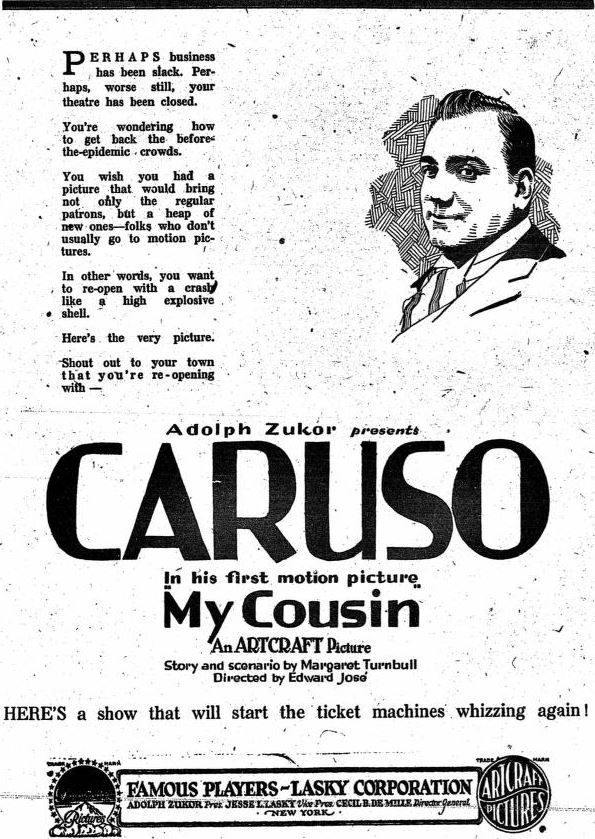
- Advertisement
- Directed by: Edward José
- Screenplay by: Margaret Turnbull
- Produced by: Jesse L. Lasky; Adolph Zukor
- Starring: Enrico Caruso; Henry Leone; Carolina White; Joseph Riccardi; A.G. Corbelle; Bruno Zirato
- Cinematography: Hal Young
- Production companies: Famous Players–Lasky Corporation; Artcraft Pictures Corporation
- Distributed by: Paramount Pictures
- Release date: November 24, 1918
- Running time: 50 minutes
- Country: United States
- Language: Silent (English intertitles)

My Cousin is a 1918 American silent drama film directed by Edward José and written by Margaret Turnbull. The film stars Enrico Caruso, Henry Leone, Carolina White, Joseph Riccardi, A.G. Corbelle, and Bruno Zirato. The film was released on November 24, 1918, by Paramount Pictures.

== Plot ==
As described in a film magazine, Tommasso Longo, a poor artist making his living modeling plaster casts, proudly boasts that he is a cousin of Caroli, the great tenor, whom he greatly resembles. Tommasso is in love with Rosa Ventura, a cashier in her father's restaurant, and although she flirts with Roberto Lombardi, she loves Tommasso. They go to the opera together, and Roberto becomes jealous and ridicules Tommasso's claim of a relationship to the tenor. Caroli comes to the restaurant where Tommasso and Rosa are dining after the show. As Caroli leaves he fails to recognize a relative in Tommasso. Rosa becomes indignant at Tommasso and refuses listen any further to his vows of devotion. Determined to square himself in the eyes of his sweetheart, he goes to the apartment of the great tenor but is politely sent home. Ludovico, an errand boy in Tommasso's studio, goes to Caroli and reveals the truth to him. Caroli pays his cousin a visit at his studio and directs him to finish a bust of him. With the blessing of Caroli upon them, the love of Rosa is once more won.

== Cast ==
The feature film

- Enrico Caruso as Tommasso Longo/Cesare Caroli
- Henry Leone as Roberto Lombardi
- Carolina White as Rosa Ventura
- Joseph Riccardi as Pietro Ventura
- A.G. Corbelle as Luigi Veddi
- Bruno Zirato as A Secretary
- Will H. Bray as Ludovico
