= Jenny Dufau =

French opera singer

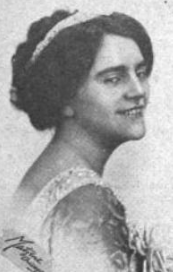
- Jenny Dufau, from a 1916 publication.
- Born: 18 July 1878; Rothau, Alsace-Lorraine, German Empire
- Died: 29 August 1924 (aged 46); Pau, France
- Other name: Jennie Dufau
- Occupation: Opera singer

Jenny Dufau (18 July 1878 – 29 August 1924) was an opera singer born in Germany who found her success in Chicago.

== Early life and education ==
Dufau was born on 18 July 1878 in Rothau, Alsace-Lorraine, the daughter of linen merchant Alfred Dufau. As a girl, she trained to work as a potter, her father's trade. She studied music in Berlin with Etelka Gerster and made her debut in 1906 at Weimar as Queen in Les Huguenots. She also studied with Mathilde Marchesi, Paul Vidal, and Alessandro Guagni Benvenuti.

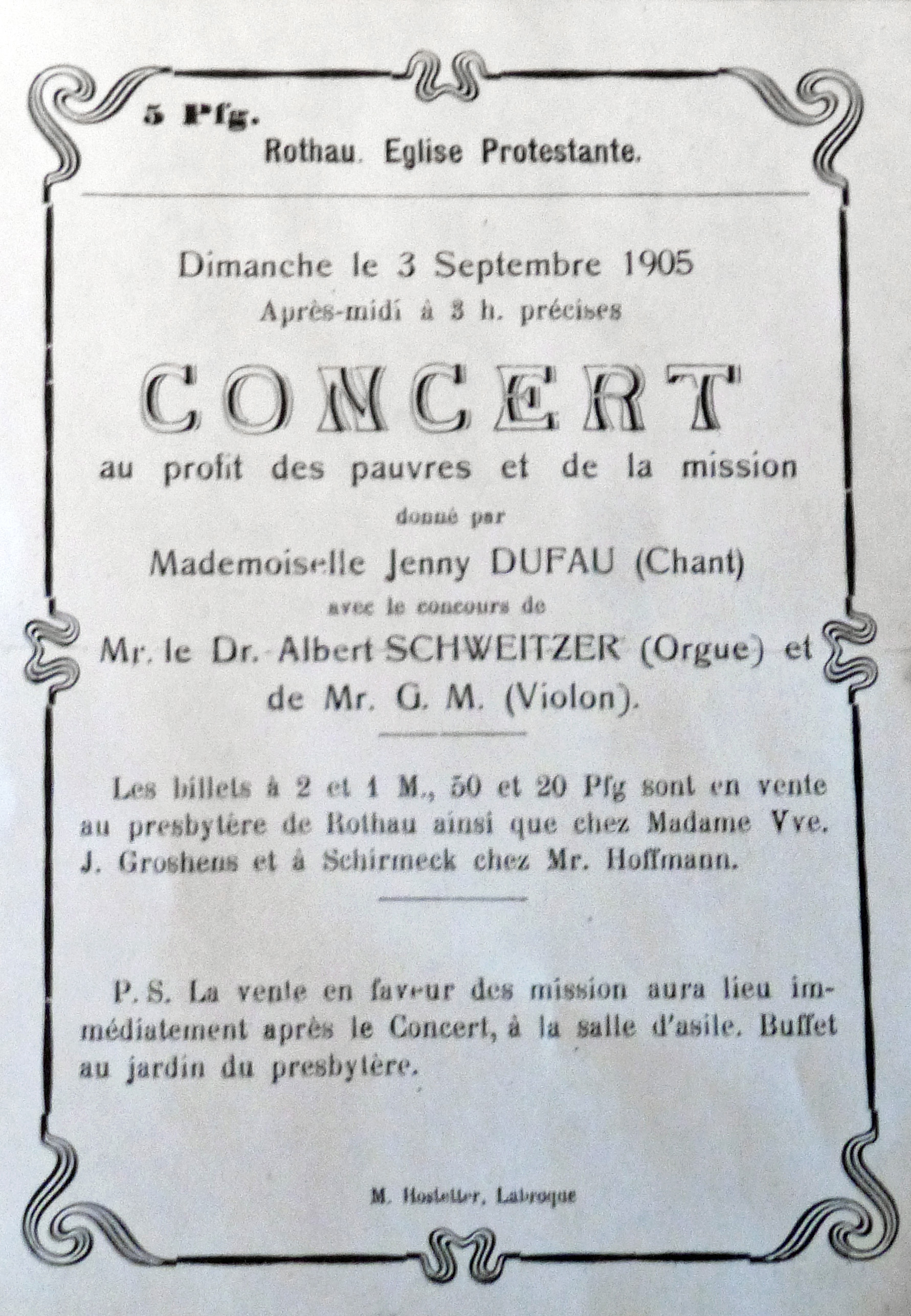
A program from 1905, for a concert in Rothau featuring Jenny Dufau and Albert Schweitzer.

== Career ==
Dufau began her career in 1910 in Italy at the Teatro Vittorio Emanuele in Ancona, as Filina in Mignon. In 1910 and 1911 she performed in various Italian houses and at Lirico of Bucharest and Royal of Atene. At the end of 1911 she went to the United States, engaged by Andreas Dippel for the Chicago Grand Opera Company.

In Chicago, Dufau was a lead soprano, nicknamed the "smallest soprano". She performed in operas such as Die Walküre, The Barber of Seville, and I gioielli della Madonna. In 1914, she sang the title role in Massenet's Manon for the Boston Opera Company. In 1916, Dufau moved to New York, and shifted her focus to singing concerts nationwide, notably at the Ravinia Festival, Hamilton Park (Chicago), and Symphony Hall, Boston. The American composer Frank La Forge wrote songs for her, which she performed at these concerts. Dufau wrote songs for her concerts, including "A Soldier I Shall Be", a patriotic wartime anthem.

Dufau also participated in a burgeoning art form called "Cinema Concerts", in which she sang with silent films. In 1916, she performed with the film The Law Decides. She wrote at least one silent film scenario, My Prince Charming.

Dufau returned to Europe following the end of World War I and she performed in 1918 at Royal of Madrid in Barbiere di Siviglia. Her last tracked performance was in Lucia di Lammermoor given at Teatro Toselli of Cuneo.

== Personal life ==
Dufau was visiting her family in Alsace in 1914, when she narrowly escaped execution as a spy. She died on 29 August 1924 in Pau, France. There is an archive of her papers at the Newberry Library in Chicago.
