= Fazioli =

Italian piano company

Fazioli Pianoforti
- Type: Joint-stock company
- Industry: Musical instruments
- Founded: 1981
- Founder: Paolo Fazioli
- Headquarters: Sacile, Italy
- Key people: Paolo Fazioli
- Products: Grand Pianos, Concert Grand Pianos
- Revenue: €10,000,000 (2018)
- Number of employees: 50 (2018)
- Website: fazioli.com

Fazioli Pianoforti (Italian pronunciation: [fatˈtsjɔːli ˌpjanoˈfɔrti]), translated as Fazioli Pianos, produces grand and concert pianos from their factory in Sacile, Italy. The company was founded by engineer and pianist Paolo Fazioli in 1981. As of 2016, craftsmen at Fazioli build 140 pianos a year.

== History ==
Paolo Fazioli was born in Rome in 1944, into a family of furniture makers. In 1969, he graduated from Sapienza University with a degree in mechanical engineering, and received a diploma in piano at the G. Rossini Conservatory in Pesaro in 1971, where he studied under Sergio Cafaro. In the same period, he also earned a master's degree in music composition at the Academy of St. Cecilia, where he studied with the composer Boris Porena.

In the meantime, his older brothers took over the family business: a factory producing office furniture, using rare and exotic woods such as teak, mahogany and rosewood. Paolo Fazioli joined the company as well; however, he never gave up on pursuing his dream of building the world's finest grand pianos. Thus, at the end of the 1970s, the Fazioli Piano Factory was realized within the furniture plant in Sacile, about 40 miles north of Venice.

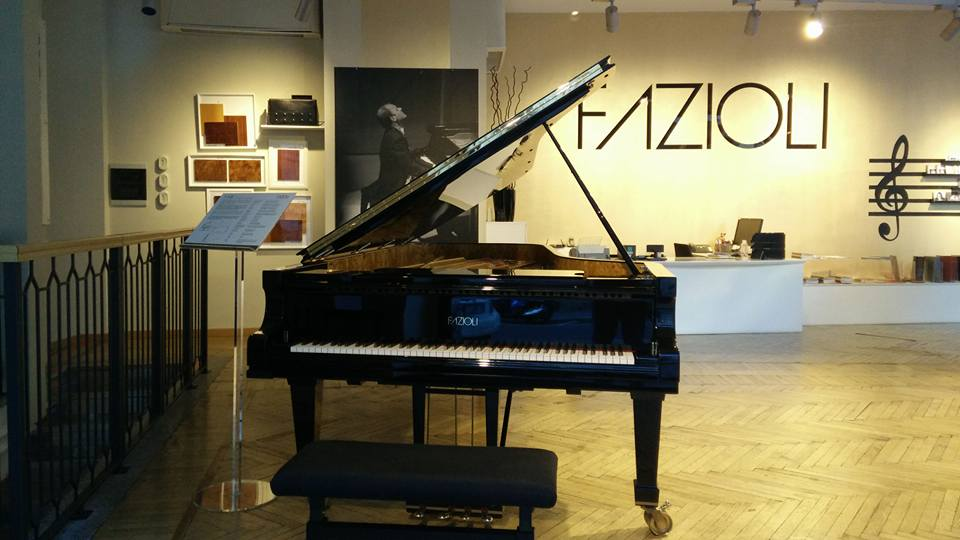
A Fazioli F308 in the Milan Showroom

In 1979, Fazioli started designing the first prototype for a baby grand piano. He was assisted by a small team consisting of Professor Pietro Righini, an expert in musical acoustics, and Professor Guglielmo Giordano, a wood technologist, as well as Virgilio Fazioli and Lino Tiveron. The prototype of the F183 model was completed in June 1980, followed at the end of the year by the prototypes of two other models, the F156 and the F278. In the latter half of the year, work began on the prototype of the F228 model.

In February 1982, all four models were exhibited at the Musikmesse Frankfurt. The production area within the MIM factory was subsequently expanded to 600 square meters (6,500 sq ft) increasing production to two pianos per month.

In 1983, the company began collaborating with Zeltron (Zanussi Institute for Research) with the aim of further improving tonal quality. Initial success followed in 1984 and 1985 when pianists including Aldo Ciccolini, Alfred Brendel, Martha Argerich, Vladimir Ashkenazy, Lazar Berman, Nikita Magaloff, Michel Beroff, Annie Fischer, Louis Lortie and many others began to play on Fazioli pianos. A number of important concert halls purchased the F278 concert grand piano, and the firm started exporting to major European countries and the United States.

The demand for an instrument having even greater power and richness of tone, for use in large concert halls, inspired the concept of the F308 model, which is presently the longest piano available on the market. Alongside this project, work began on a new model to complement the existing line, the medium-size F212 with a length of 212 cm.

In 1998, the company purchased an area of approximately 14,000 square meters (150,000 sq ft) next to the existing factory, leading to the construction of a new plant capable of producing approximately 150 instruments per year. The new facility includes a laboratory for acoustic research and a concert hall in which new instruments can be tested. In 2001, the new factory edged closer to the target of 100 pianos per year.

In 2004, large orders were placed and production finally exceeded 100 units. That same year, the new offices and the Fazioli Concert Hall were completed. Equipped with variable acoustic devices, the hall is ideal for instrument testing, concerts and recordings alike.

The Fazioli Concert Hall's first concert season was inaugurated by Aldo Ciccolini, who played the instrument which is still standing in the hall: the F278 concert grand nicknamed "Merlin the Magician" by Ciccolini.

By 2006, Fazioli was producing between 120 and 130 pianos per year.

== Use by professional musicians ==
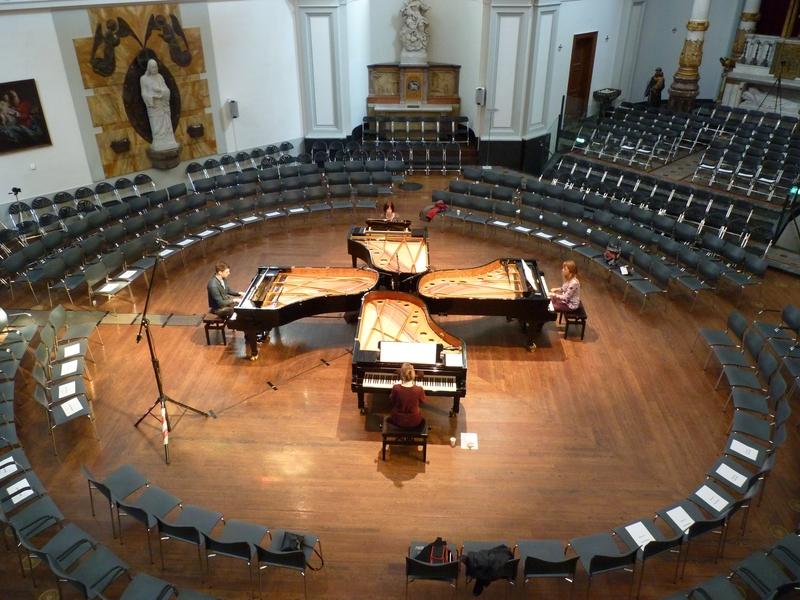
The Dutch Rondane Quartet plays four Fazioli pianos

The prototype of the first F308 received its first public performance in 1987, at the Teatro Comunale in Monfalcone, where French pianist François-Joël Thiollier performed both of Tchaikovsky's piano concertos.

Later that year, Lazar Berman played Liszt's Second Concerto on the F308 concert grand at the Carnegie Hall in New York. Murray Perahia also requested the same model for his concert at the Teatro Goldoni in Venice.

Toward the end of that year, Alfred Brendel chose to perform on Fazioli pianos for his Italian tour. The cooperation with the Zanussi R&D Center led to the optimization of the entire product line: the six improved models (F156, F183, F212, F228, F278, F308), which today still represent the entire Fazioli range, were showcased at the 1988 edition of the Musikmesse Frankfurt. Following the expansion and modernization, output hit six units per month in this period. In 1994, Fazioli Pianoforti attended its first exhibition at the NAMM Show in Anaheim, California.

In the same year, the company displayed at Music China in Shanghai. A concert grand piano was installed in the Sydney Town Hall in Australia and its debut performance came in a concert attended by Australian Prime Minister Paul Keating. Fazioli pianos were also chosen for the Gina Bachauer Piano Competition in Salt Lake City.

In 1993, Indonesian pianist Ananda Sukarlan recorded his first CD, The Pentatonic Connection on the first Fazioli piano in Holland.

In 1995, the F308 model was unveiled at the NAMM Show. In June, the F308 model was presented in China, leading to the purchase of one of these instruments by the Beijing Conservatory.

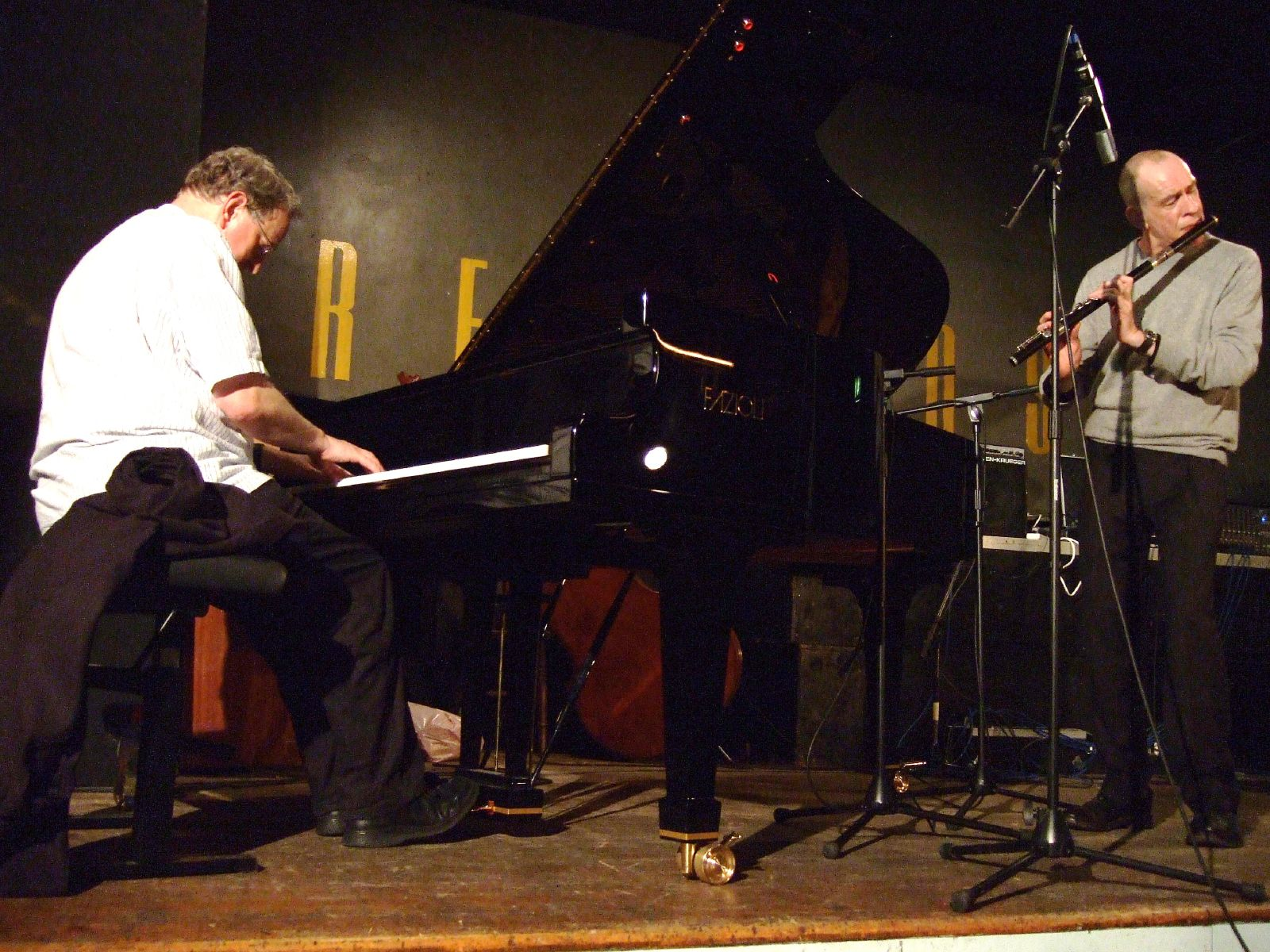
Steve Beresford plays a Fazioli piano.

In 1996, pianists Ingeborg Baldaszti, Markus Schirmer, Jasminka Stancul, and Elisabeth Leonskaya selected a Fazioli piano for performances at the Vienna Musikverein. The company also produced the Brunei concert grand for the Sultan of Brunei, which incorporated inlays of precious stones, mother-of-pearl, and exotic woods. Alongside its standard black pianos, Fazioli produces custom art case models designed to individual customer specifications.

In 1997, Fazioli pianos were used for the first time at Umbria Jazz, one of the world's premier jazz festivals, both for the summer edition in Perugia and the winter companion festival in Orvieto. Through Umbria Jazz, some leading jazz pianists have since become devotees of Fazioli pianos, including Herbie Hancock, Martial Solal, Brad Mehldau, Chucho Valdez, Michel Camilo, Uri Caine, Kenny Barron, Stefano Bollani, Enrico Pieranunzi, Danilo Rea.

The company's relationship with pianist Angela Hewitt became even more productive in 2003, when the artist began requesting Fazioli pianos for her world concert tours. In January 2020 her unique four-pedal F278 Fazioli was dropped by instrument movers and was considered unsalvageable by Paolo Fazioli.

In May, Louis Lortie used a Fazioli grand piano to perform a recital in place of Maurizio Pollini at Carnegie Hall in New York, earning glowing reviews. During the same year The Economist reported that "some artists believe that Fazioli now makes the best pianos in the world".

In September 2003, during a memorial ceremony for the victims of the September 11 attacks in New York City, 21 Fazioli pianos were used for the world premiere of "Sinfonia per 21 Pianoforti" by Italian composer and pianist Daniele Lombardi.

In June 2010, in an interview with Michael Gallant of Keyboard magazine, Herbie Hancock talks about his Fazioli giving him inspiration to do things.

The Juilliard School, New York, bought a Fazioli grand piano in 2015 and at least two more in 2016.

In the April 2020 Global Citizen One World: Together at Home benefit for COVID-19, Stevie Wonder played a Fazioli at his home.

In July 2020, Nick Cave said that after playing a Fazioli in Idiot Prayer he became so enthusiastic about it that he contacted the company asking to receive one for free, but his request was rejected.

Fazioli pianos are used at many piano competitions, including the Chopin Piano Competition in Warsaw (2010, 2015, 2021, 2025), the Tchaikovsky Competition in Moscow (2011, 2015) and the Rubinstein Piano Master Competition in Tel Aviv (May 2014), where five out of the six finalists chose the Fazioli piano for their concerto performance. In the International Chopin Piano Competition in Warsaw in October, 2021 three of the 12 finalists played a Fazioli, including Bruce Liu, its winner. In the 2025 edition, the winner, Eric Lu, played a Fazioli.

== Models ==
Fazioli offers seven models of grand pianos, the largest being the Fazioli F308 which, with its 3.08 m (10.2 ft), is the longest piano available on the general market. The Fazioli F308 has the "fourth pedal", which brings the hammers closer to the strings, thus reducing sound volume without changing the tone, functioning just like the half-blow pedal on an upright piano.

Camerata Tokyo released a Blu-ray named The Sound of the Concert Grand Fazioli F278: Costantino Catena plays Debussy and Schumann (Camerata Tokyo 2013, CMBD-80005).

=== Grand piano models ===
- F308: 308 cm (10.1 ft)
- F278: 278 cm (9.1 ft)
- F228: 228 cm (7.5 ft)
- F212: 212 cm (7 ft)
- F198: 198 cm (6.5 ft)
- F183: 183 cm (6 ft)
- F156: 156 cm (5.1 ft)
