= Gaetano Emanuel Calì =

Italian composer, orchestra conductor, and bandleader

Gaetano Emanuel Calì (1885 in Catania – 1936 in Syracuse) was an Italian composer, orchestra conductor, and bandleader. He was student of Francesco Paolo Frontini, under whom he began to study classical instead of popular music.

Calì composed his most popular piece in Malta in 1910, when he found himself on the island for professional reasons. A mattinata titled "E vui durmiti ancora", it started him on a career of composing similar songs. This included works such as "Sicilia Bedda", meant to reflect the character of the island of Sicily.

Calì divided his artistic activities between classical and popular music; among his works in the former category were symphonic poems, chamber music, liturgical pieces, and patriotic hymns. He also founded a folkloric group, the Canterini etnei, in 1929, with which he had a good deal of success.

Calì died in Syracuse in 1936.
