= Aleramo =

Aleramo is a surname. Notable people with the surname include:

- Aleramo, Marquess of Montferrat (died 991)
- Sibilla Aleramo (1876–1960), Italian author and poet
