= Il segreto di Susanna =

Opera by Ermanno Wolf-Ferrari

- Opera by Ermanno Wolf-Ferrari
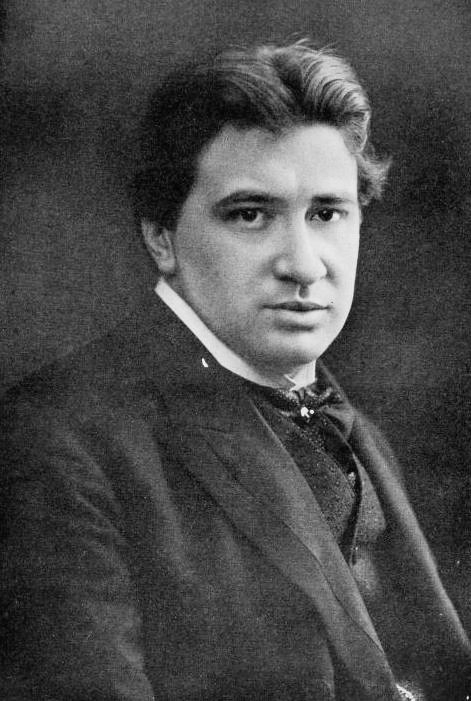
- The composer in 1906
- Translation: Susanna's Secret
- Librettist: Enrico Golisciani
- Language: Italian
- Premiere: 4 December 1909 (in German); Hoftheater, Munich

Il segreto di Susanna (English: Susanna's Secret, German: Susannens Geheimnis) is an intermezzo in one act by Ermanno Wolf-Ferrari to an Italian libretto by Enrico Golisciani. The opera premiered in 1909 and is the most frequently performed of all of Wolf-Ferrari's works. The overture of the work has become a well known concert piece. The opera tells the story of a husband who suspects his wife is having an affair after discovering she smells like cigarettes; only later to discover that her secret is that she is a smoker. Musicologist John C.G. Waterhouse, wrote the following: "Il segreto di Susanna owes its success partly to its disarming simplicity. Lasting barely 45 minutes, with only two singing characters, it is conveniently cheap to produce; and the slender but distinctive idea of the libretto, combined with the elegant if rather miscellaneous charm of the music, has an obvious appeal which even subsequent cancer research has not seriously undermined."

== Performance history ==
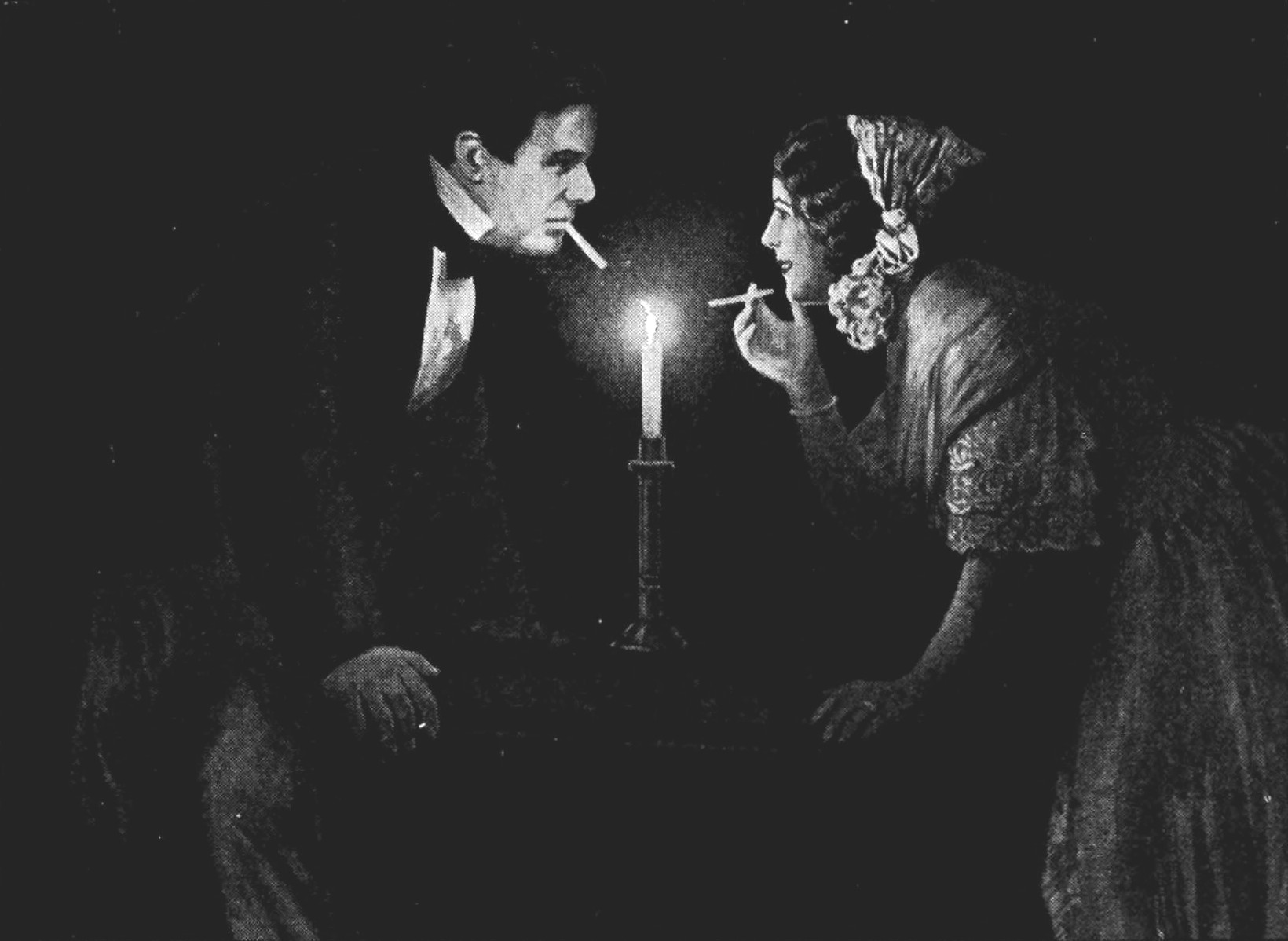
Mario Sammarco and Lydia Lipkowska in Il segreto di Susanna

While initially written in Italian, the premiere performance of Il segreto di Susanna was given in the German language using a translation by Max Kalbeck, at the Hoftheater in Munich on 4 December 1909. The most frequently performed of all of Wolf-Ferrari's works, the overture of the opera has become a well known concert piece. The United States premiere of the opera took place at the Metropolitan Opera House in New York City on March 14, 1911 with a performance in the Italian language. Presented at the Met by Andreas Dippel's touring Philadelphia-Chicago Grand Opera Company, the production starred Carolina White as Susanna, Mario Sammarco as Count Gil and the Italian tenor Francesco Daddi in the silent role of Sante.

Mario Sammarco reprised the role of Count Gil with soprano Lydia Lipkowska performing the role of Susanna for the first staging of the opera at the Royal Opera House, Covent Garden in July 1911; with soprano Alice Nielsen later assuming the role at that theatre for performances in 1913. In 1918 Fortune Gallo's San Carlo Opera Company toured the United States with the opera in a production starring Marcella Craft and Joseph Royer.

In 1976 the opera was revived at the Royal Opera House, Covent Garden with a production starring Maria Chiara and Bernd Weikl. The production was recorded and released on disc by Decca Records.

A new production of the opera was staged at La Fenice in 2016.

A much celebrated new production of the opera was staged at Opera Holland Park in 2019, directed by John Wilkie with Clare Presland, Richard Burkhard, and John Savournin performing the roles. John Andrews conducted the City of London Sinfonia. The production was nominated in the ‘Best Production’ category at the International Opera Awards. It will return in the summer of 2024

== Roles ==
Roles, voice types, premiere cast
Role	Voice type	Premiere cast, 4 December 1909 Conductor: Felix Mottl
Countess Susanna (aged 20)	soprano	Ella Tordek
Count Gil (aged 30)	baritone	Friedrich Brodersen
Sante, a dumb servant (aged 50)	Non singing	Josef Geis

== Synopsis ==
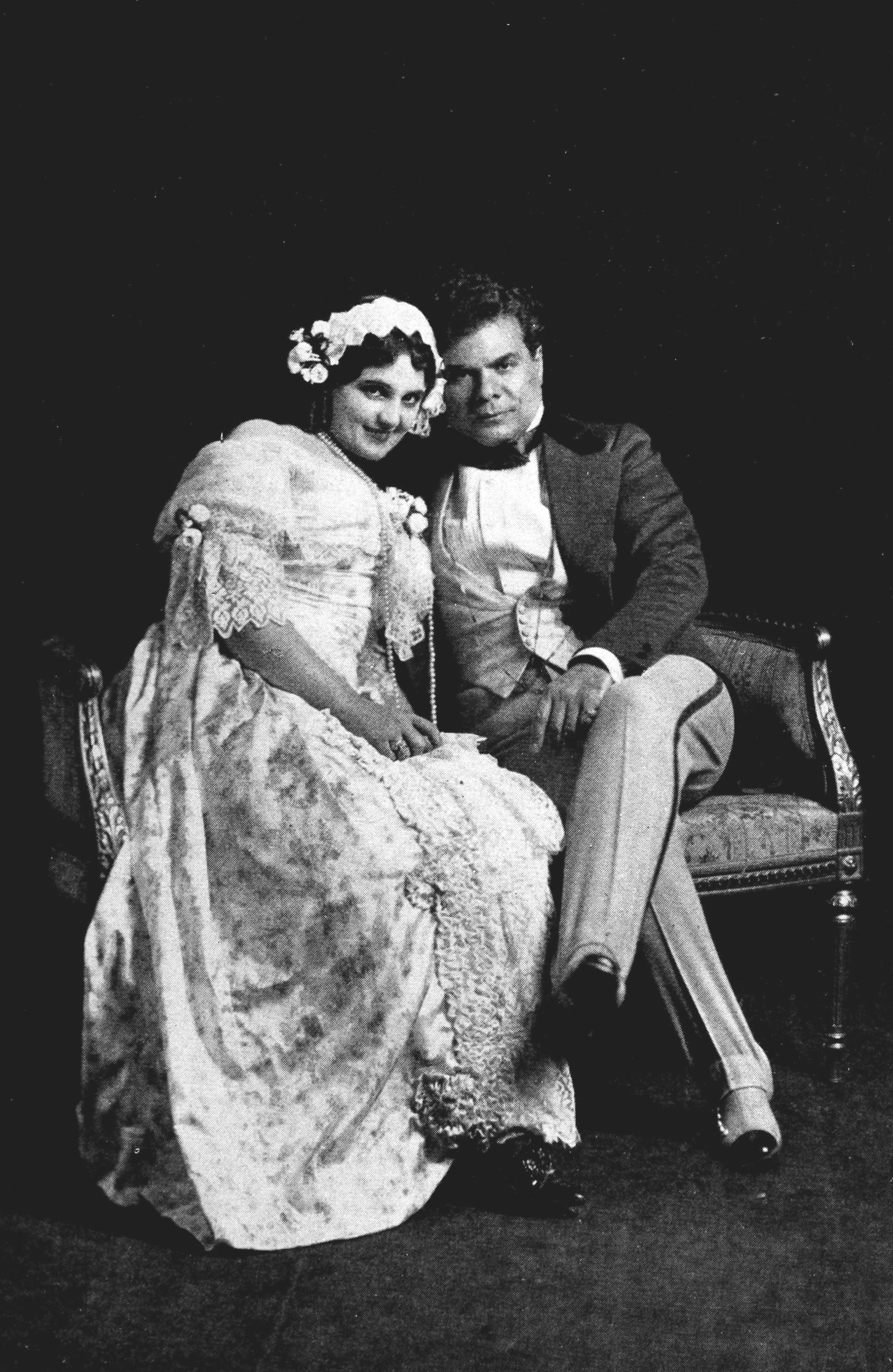
Carolina White and Mario Sammarco, in the US premiere on 14 March 1911 at the old Metropolitan Opera House, New York City

Time: Early 20th century
Place: A drawing room in Piedmont

Count Gil returns home suspecting that he has seen his wife, Susanna, walking alone in the street, something he had forbidden her to do after their wedding. He is relieved when he discovers that she is playing the piano in the living room. However, it was indeed the countess whom he had seen but she returned home shortly before her husband.

Gil's happiness is short-lived. The room smells of tobacco, and he is surprised since he does not smoke and neither does Susanna, nor the servant, Sante. Suddenly a horrible thought strikes him: is it possible that Susanna is unfaithful to him with a smoker? He speaks with his wife and is soon ashamed of having such suspicions. Gil wants to hug Susanna, but he notices that the tobacco smell comes from Susanna's clothes. She finally admits to having a secret, but does not want to tell him what it is. Gil becomes angry and starts to turn the house upside-down after she locks herself in her bedroom. Finally, as Gil is leaving the house to go to his club, she brings him his umbrella. He softens, they become reconciled, and he exits.

As soon as he leaves the house, she closes the door and opens the small packet she gave to Sante when she came home. She takes out a cigarette and the two smoke. That is her secret! But while she is smoking with Sante, Gil comes back. Smelling the tobacco he starts to search the house for Susanna's lover on the pretext of looking for the umbrella he forgot. Having no success, Gil furiously goes out again and Susanna lights a second cigarette. Once more Gil enters and, this time, he is sure that he will catch her in the act. Trying to seize her hand, he gets burned thus finally unveiling her secret. They forgive each other and swear eternal love while smoking together.

== Recordings ==
- 1952 – Ester Orel, Mario Borriello; Orchestra Sinfonica di Torino, Alfredo Simonetto – Cetra Records (LP), later licensed to Deutsche Grammophon
- 1954 – Elena Rizzieri, Giuseppe Valdengo; Italian Radio Symphony Orchestra Turin, Angelo Questa – Cetra Records
- 1976 – Maria Chiara, Bernd Weikl; Orchestra of the Royal Opera House, Lamberto Gardelli – Decca (LP)
- 1980 – Renata Scotto, Renato Bruson; Philharmonia Orchestra, John Pritchard – CBS (LP and CD)
- 2006 – Judith Howarth, Àngel Òdena; Oviedo Filarmonia, Friedrich Haider – live in Oviedo
- 2008 – Dora Rodrigues, Marc Canturri, Royal Liverpool Philharmonic, Vasily Petrenko (conductor) – live in Liverpool, Avie Records, issued in cooperation with the European Commission
