= Giuseppe Dell'Orefice =

Italian composer and conductor

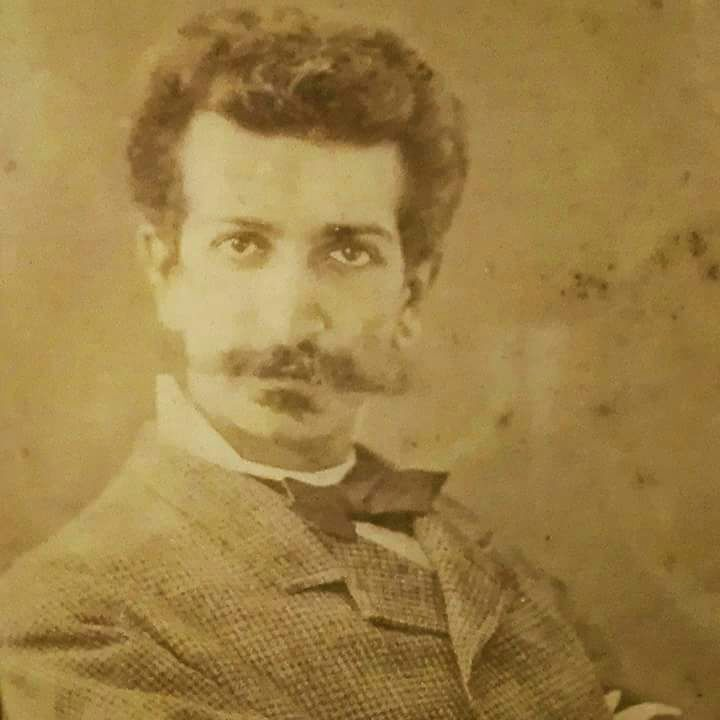
Giuseppe Dell'Orefice

Giuseppe Dell'Orefice (22 August 1848 – 3 January 1889) born in Fara Filiorum Petri, province of Chieti, was an Italian composer, and conductor best-remembered for his opera Romilda de'Bardi. He died in Naples.

== Works ==
- Romilda De'Bardi (1874, Naples) opera in 3 acts
- Egmont (1878, Teatro di San Carlo, Naples) opera in 4 acts, libretto by Graziano Fulina
- Il Segreto della Duchessa (1879, Naples) opera, libretto by Enrico Golisciani
- Magnificat (for choir and tenor and bass soloists, 1879)
- I fantasmi (ballet in 3 acts, 1873)
