= Gli amanti sposi =

Opera by Ermanno Wolf-Ferrari

Gli amanti sposi is an opera giocosa in 3 acts by Ermanno Wolf-Ferrari to a libretto by Luigi Sugana, Giuseppe Pizzolato, Enrico Golisciani and Giovacchino Forzano, after Carlo Goldoni's Il ventaglio (1765). It premiered 19 February 1925 at La Fenice, Venice.
