= Il campiello =

Opera by Ermanno Wolf-Ferrari

- commedia lirica by Ermanno Wolf-Ferrari
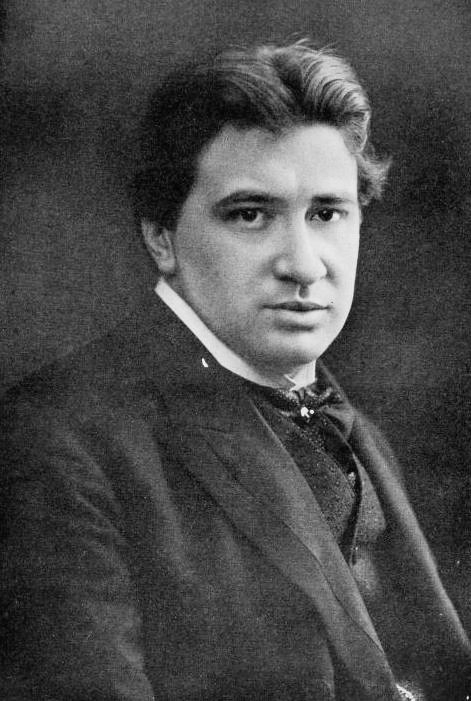
- The composer in 1906
- Translation: The Little Square
- Librettist: Mario Ghisalberti
- Language: Italian (Venetian dialect)
- Based on: Il campiello by Carlo Goldoni
- Premiere: 11 February 1936; La Scala, Milan

Il campiello (The Little Square) is an opera in three acts by Ermanno Wolf-Ferrari. The libretto was by Mario Ghisalberti, after the famous comedy of the same name written for the 1756 Venetian Carnival by the great Venetian playwright, Carlo Goldoni.

Referred to as a commedia lirica, it is an ensemble opera influenced by Mozart, as well as Giuseppe Verdi's last opera Falstaff. It is concerned with the public lives of the volatile inhabitants of a "campiello" in Venice and is sung in the local dialect (except for two Neapolitan roles).

== Performance history ==
Il campiello was first performed at La Scala, Milan, on 11 February 1936 under Gino Marinuzzi and as opera director Marcello Govoni.

It has remained in the Italian repertory and occasionally been performed abroad. The Fujiwara Opera gave the Japanese premiere in Tokyo in July 1978. They revived it in July 2001 under Marco Titotto, including some Italian singers from the 1992 Trieste production.

== Roles ==
Role	Voice type	Premiere Cast, 11 February 1936 (Conductor: Gino Marinuzzi)
Astolfi, a Neapolitan gentleman	baritone	Salvatore Baccaloni
Gasparina, an affected young woman	soprano	Mafalda Favero
Fabrizio, Gasparina's uncle and guardian, a Neapolitan	bass	Franco Zaccarini
Dona Cate, a widow	tenor	Luigi Nardi
Luçieta, Dona Cate's daughter	soprano	Iris Adami-Corradetti
Orsola, a fritter seller	mezzo -soprano	Giulia Tess
Zorzeto, Orsola's son	tenor	Luigi Fort
Dona Pasqua, a widow	tenor	Giuseppe Nessi
Gnese, Dona Pasqua's daughter	soprano	Margherita Carosio
Anzoleto, a haberdasher	bass	Fernando Autori

== Synopsis ==
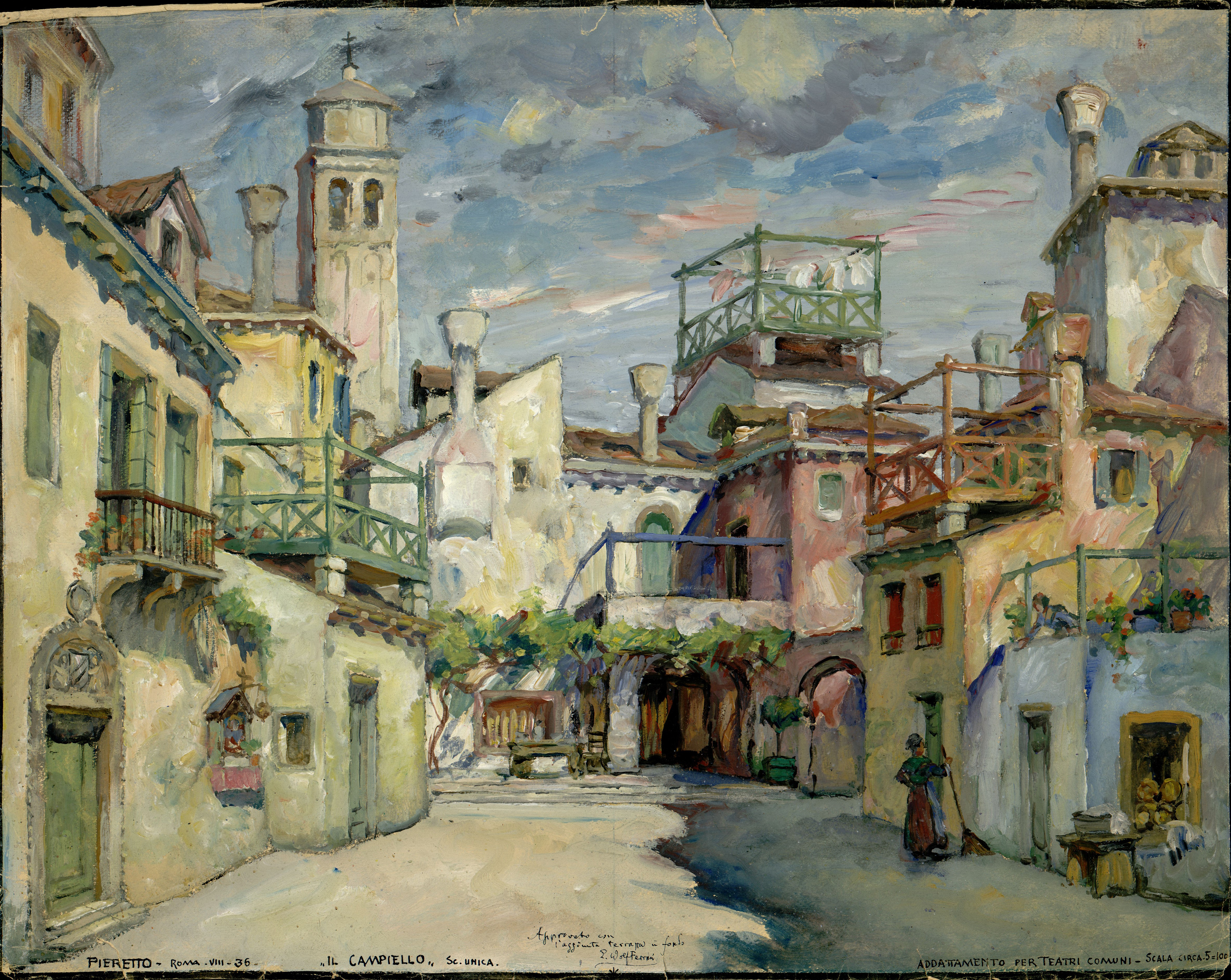
Set design by Pieretto Bianco for the original performance

Setting

Mid 18th century. Throughout the opera the setting is the same: a small square ('campiello'). In one corner there is an inn where Astolfi (baritone role), an amiable Neapolitan gentleman, spendthrift, and ladies' man, is staying. In the houses around the inn live a number of single women, all of them in search of men or husbands. Gasparina (soprano) is a comically pretentious young woman who lives with her bookish uncle Fabrizio (baritone), also a Neapolitan as it turns out. Luçieta (soprano), is a young beauty in love with a haberdasher called Anzoleto (bass). She lives with her mother Dona Cate (tenor). Luçieta's rival is another attractive girl called Gnese (soprano) who lives with her mother Dona Pasqua (tenor). Both the mothers are comic roles played by men. Gnese is in love with a boy called Zorzeto who also lives in the square with his mother Orsola (mezzo-soprano).

=== Act 1 ===
Gasparina appears first, then Astolfi: they greet each other with mutual interest. Luçieta enters next, impatient because Anzoleto is late. Astolfi flirts with her as well. When Anzoleto appears peddling his haberdashery, the stranger offers to buy Luçieta a present and Anzoleto becomes jealous. Gnese appears, wanting to buy some needles or thread, and calls Anzoleto over. Luçieta in turn becomes angry. Astolfi also offers to buy something for Gnese! He is delighted to find so many beautiful women all in one place! While Anzoleto is with Gnese, Astolfi renews his interest in Luçieta and encounters her mother Dona Cate. He offers Luçieta a ring which her mother deftly intercepts, while Gnese spurns his offer to pay for her purchases.

Dona Pasqua and Orsola talk about the future marriage of their children, Gnese and Zorzeto. Luçieta and Gnese appear, quarrelling again, and then Zorzeto. Anzoleto challenges Astolfi who denies having designs on Luçieta. Anzoleto decides he must marry Luçieta as soon as possible - to her delight! Gasparina appears again and this time Astolfi has a long conversation with her, trying to find out, in spite of her dialect, if she is available. She encourages him.

=== Act 2 ===
Luçieta, Gnese, Zorzeto and their three parents are having a loud party in the square to the annoyance of Fabrizio. Anzoleto comes in and presents his ring to Luçieta. Astolfi offers to be best man at the wedding - and to pay for dinner at the inn! He invites Gasparina and Fabrizio to join them but Fabrizio refuses. A ballet follows: waitresses, beggars, and a polenta procession. Gasparina tells Astolfi about her uncle's appalling behaviour. Just then Fabrizio appears and confronts Astolfi. He is also Neapolitan. He knows who Astolfi is, and that he is bankrupt! Astolfi in turn recognizes Fabrizio as a famous lottery winner! Fabrizio tells him that he wants to marry off Gasparina - and there will be a big dowry!

The drinking party spreads onto the square but their high spirits once again turn into quarrelling before they return to the inn. Fabrizio is determined once and for all to leave the noisy square and find somewhere else to live. Astolfi concentrates his attention on Gasparina, while clutching the dinner bill in his hand and wondering how he is going to pay it. The party once again erupts into the square singing and dancing.

=== Act 3 ===
Fabrizio's removals are in progress. Astolfi asks him for Gasparina's hand. Fabrizio admits it may be negotiable and they go away to talk over the details. The young women enter. Luçieta will get married that evening, Gnese in two years time. Orsola and Luçieta go off talking. Anzoleto comes in looking for Luçieta and is furious that she has gone to Orsola's house. When she emerges he slaps her. Dona Cate suggests she can find a better son-in-law and Anzoleto tries to take back his ring, but Luçieta refuses to give it to him. She knows that he hit her because he loves her. Anzoleto blames Zorzeto. It was all his fault. They leave but Gnese recounts the incident to Zorzeto, to Orsola's dismay. Zorzeto throws stones at Dona Cate's house hitting the old lady, and general pandemonium breaks out with Anzoleto and Zorzeto threatening to kill each other, and Dona Cate and Dona Pasqua insulting one another.

Astolfi appears and orders them all to be quiet. They are invited to have dinner with him. He and Gasparina will be married that evening - and they will be gone in the morning! Gasparina sings a final farewell to the leading member of the cast, the city of Venice ('Bondi, Venezia cara'), which swells into a final chorus.

== Recordings ==
Il campiello has been recorded at least twice: by RAI in Milan under Ettore Gracis in 1963, and at a live performance at the Teatro Comunale Trieste under Niksa Bareza in 1992.
