= I gioielli della Madonna =

Opera by Ermanno Wolf-Ferrari

- Opera by Ermanno Wolf-Ferrari
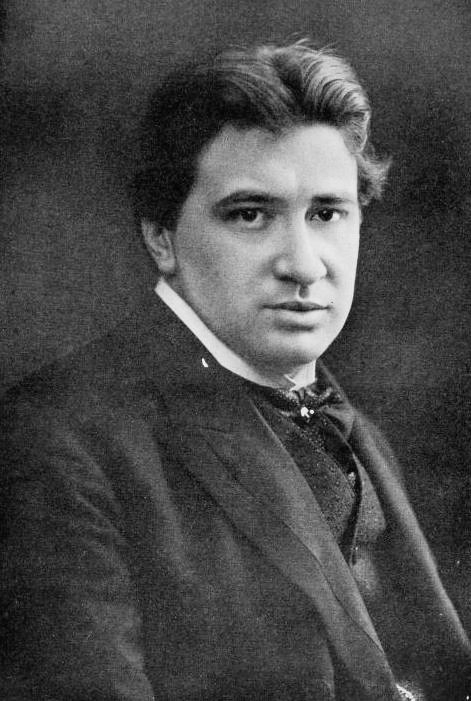
- The composer in 1906
- Translation: The Jewels of the Madonna
- Librettist: Carlo Zangarini; Enrico Golisciani
- Language: Italian
- Premiere: 23 December 1911 (in German); Kurfürstenoper Berlin

I gioielli della Madonna (English: The Jewels of the Madonna) is a opera in three acts by Ermanno Wolf-Ferrari to an Italian libretto by Carlo Zangarini and Enrico Golisciani, based on news accounts of a real event. First performed in 1911, the opera's controversial themes include love between a brother and his adoptive sister, implied criticism of the Catholic Church, and an on-stage orgy.

== Performance history ==
I gioielli della Madonna was first performed at the Kurfürstenoper Berlin on 23 December 1911 under the title Der Schmuck der Madonna. That performance was in German, but now it is usually given in Italian. (Wolf-Ferrari stated that his operas were often first given in German simply because he had a German publisher.)

The opera was next staged in Chicago for the work's United States premiere and the opera's first performance in the Italian language in January 1912 by the Philadelphia-Chicago Grand Opera Company (PCGOC) with conductor Cleofonte Campanini and a cast that included tenor Amedeo Bassi as Gennaro, Louise Berat as Carmela, Carolina White as Maliella, Mario Sammarco as Rafaele, Francesco Daddi as Biaso, Jenny Dufau as Stella, Mabel Riegelman as Concetta, Marta Wittkowska as Serena, Emilio Venturini as Ciccillo, Edmond Warnery as Totonno, Nicolò Fossetta as Rocco, and Rosina Galli in the dancing role of Grazia. The company then toured with the production for performances at the Metropolitan Opera House in New York and the Metropolitan Opera House in Philadelphia later that year, and once again toured with that opera to New York's Met in 1914.

The Metropolitan Opera staged its own original production of the work in 1925 with Giovanni Martinelli as Gennaro, Marion Telva as Carmela, and Maria Jeritza as Maliella; a production which remained in the Met's repertory through 1927. The work was also staged in New York in 1913, this time at the Century Opera House with Elizabeth Amsden drawing particular praise for her performance as Maliella. In 1918 the Chicago Grand Opera Company staged the work with Giacomo Rimini as Rafaele, Rosa Raisa as Maliella, and Giuseppe Gaudenzi as Gennaro; a production which the company brought the Manhattan Opera House in New York in 1922. The San Carlo Opera Company toured the United States with a production of the opera in 1922 starring Anna Fitziu as Maliella and Romeo Boscacci as Gennaro.

The opera was first staged in the United Kingdom at the Royal Opera House, Covent Garden on May 30, 1912 with positive reviews from the English press. However, the work was not favorably received by French critics when it was staged at the Paris Opera in 1913 with tenor Leon Campagnola as Gennaro and Vanni Marcoux as Rafaele. The opera was given in Budapest in 1913, conducted by Fritz Reiner, who also conducted the first Dresden performance the following year. The Vienna State Opera staged the opera in 1937 with Margit Bokor as Maliella.

The opera was given its Italian premiere in 1953. I gioielli della Madonna is not often performed today though it remains in the repertory. The third act intermezzo was for many years a popular concert piece. It was performed by Teatro Grattacielo in New York City in 2010. In 2013 it was performed in London at Opera Holland Park. The complete opera was revived May 2015 at the Slovak National Theatre, Bratislava, and recorded for Naxos.

== Roles ==
Roles, voice types, premiere cast
| Role | Voice type | Premiere cast, 23 December 1911 Conductor: Selmar Meyrowitz |
|---|---|---|
| Biaso | tenor | Otakar Marák |
| Carmela | mezzo-soprano | Paula Weber |
| Ciccillo | tenor | Hermann Wiedemann |
| Gennaro | tenor | Kurt Frederich |
| Maliella | soprano | Ida Salden |
| Rafaele | baritone | Konrad von Zawilowski |
| Rocco | bass | Reinmar Poppe |
| Totonno | tenor | Richard Wissiak |

== Synopsis ==
=== Act 1 ===
A square in Naples by the sea

Carmela's house, an inn, Biaso's hut, and Gennaro's smithy are visible. It is a lovely afternoon during the festival of the Madonna. Downtown swarms with a noisy crowd, celebrating the event in a carnival spirit. The chorus is divided into many small groups, representing the various parts of the town. Many of them end up following a band, which has crossed the square.

In his blacksmith shop, Gennaro is making a candelabra, placing it on the anvil reverentially, as on an altar. He sings "Madonna, con sospiri" (I sigh for you, Madonna).

Maliella rushes out of her house, chased by Carmela. Maliella is a wilful girl, wanting to be rid of the tyranny of her household and wishing to throw herself into the life of the city. She strikes an attitude of bravado, singing her rebellious thoughts in the "Song of Cannetella,". The crowd gathers to hear her. From the direction of the sea comes the approaching chorus of the members of the Camorra. Maliella and the crowd dance wildly. When Carmela reappears with a pitcher of water on her head, the wayward girl is dashing along the quay joyously laughing.

Carmela tells her son how she vowed to the Madonna to seek an infant girl, born of sin, and adopt her, in order to help her sickly boy. She sings, "In the open street I found her, and you miraculously recovered." There is a touching duet for mother and son, in which Carmela bids him go and pray to the Madonna, and Gennaro asks for her blessing, before he leaves to do so. Carmela then goes into the house.

Maliella runs in, with the Camorrists after her. Rafaele is in pursuit, he being the leader of the band, a handsome, flashy blackguard. When he advances to seize and kiss her, she draws out a hat pin. Laughing, he throws off his coat, like a duellist, grasps and holds her tightly. She stabs his hand, making it bleed, then throws away the pin. He laughs disdainfully, passionately kisses the wound. There is an extended scene with accepting and rejecting flowers, wearing them, tossing them away. Rafaele heads for the inn – she turns to look at him.

As the Madonna is brought past in procession during tolling of bells and cheers from the people, Rafaele pours words of passion into Maliella's ears. The image of the Virgin, bedecked with sparkling jewels—the jewels of the Madonna—is carried past. Rafaele swears that for the love of Maliella he would even rob the sacred image of the jewels and bedeck her with them—something so sacrilegious that it would never be considered. The superstitious girl is terrified.

Gennaro, who returns at that moment, warns her against Rafaele—and the men seem about to fight. But then the procession returns, and they all kneel. Rafaele and Maliella exchange looks, as she heads back to the house. He tosses her the flower she has previously despised. She picks it up, puts it between her lips, and flies indoors.

=== Act 2 ===
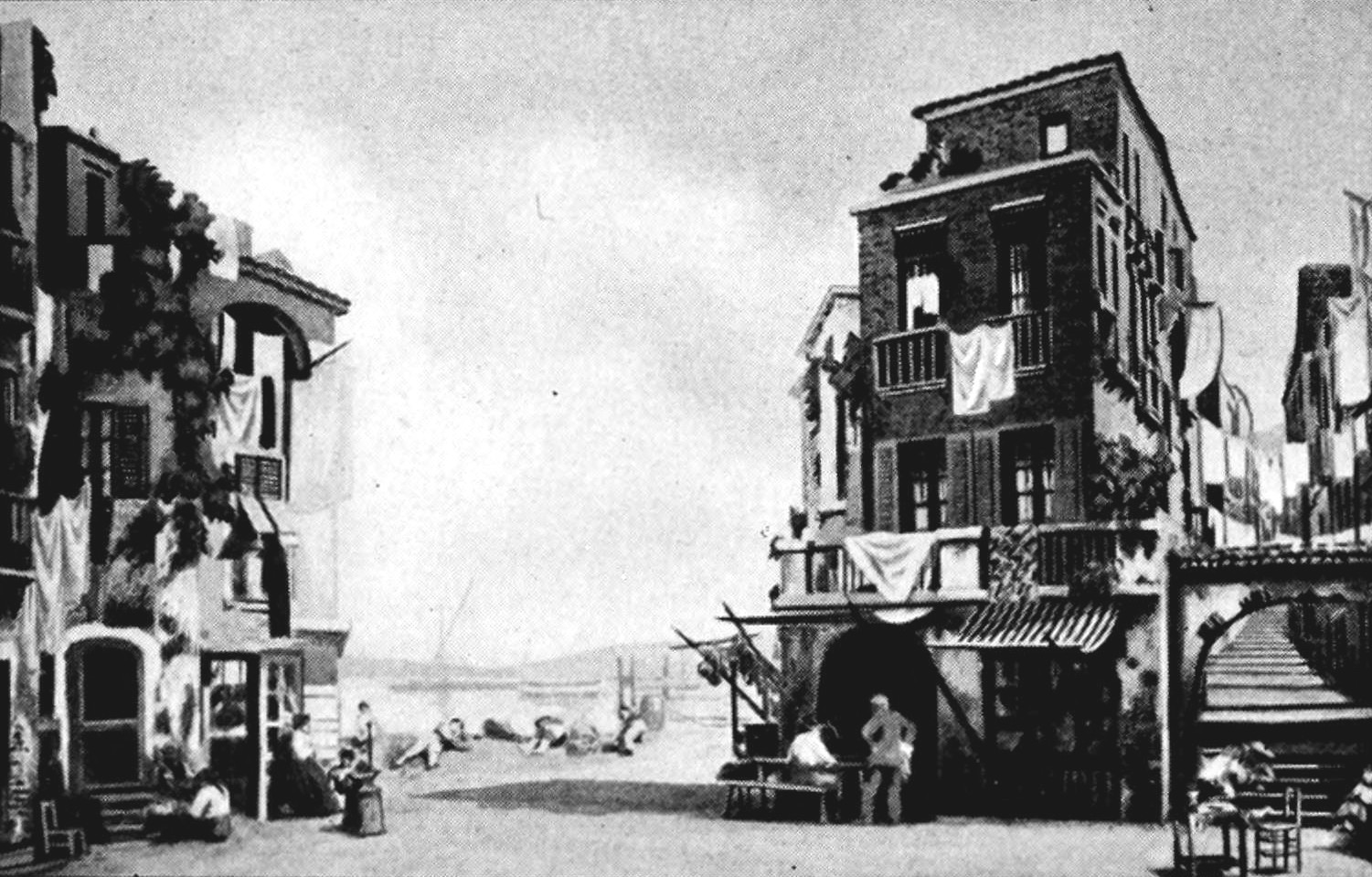
A scene from act 2

Carmela’s Garden

On the left wall a wooden staircase. Under this is a gap in the back wall shut in by a railing. It is late evening. Carmela, having cleared the table, goes into the house. Gennaro starts in to warn Maliella. She says she will have freedom, rushes up the staircase to her room, where she is seen putting her things together, while she hums, "E ndringhete, ndranghete" (I long for mirth and folly).

She descends with her bundle and is ready to leave. Gennaro pleads with her. As if lost in a reverie, with eyes half-closed, she recalls how Rafaele offered to steal the jewels of the Madonna for her. Gennaro, at first shocked at the sacrilege in the mere suggestion, appears to yield gradually to a desperate intention. He bars the way to Maliella, locks the gate, and stands facing her. Laughing derisively, she ascends the stairs again.

He goes to a cupboard under the stairs, takes out a box, opens it by the light of the lamp at the table, selects several skeleton keys and files, wraps them in a piece of leather, which he hides under his coat, takes a look at Maliella's window, crosses himself, and sneaks out.

From the direction of the sea a chorus of men's voices is heard. Rafaele appears at the gate with his Camorrist friends. To the accompaniment of their mandolins and guitars he sings a serenade to Maliella. The girl comes down into the garden. Then they sing a love duet, she promising that she will join him tomorrow. Then Rafaele's comrades signal that someone is coming.

Left to herself, she sees Gennaro's open tool box, by moonlight. As if in answer to her presentiment of what it signifies, he appears with a bundle wrapped in red cloth. He throws back the folds of the damask and spreads out on the table, for Maliella, the jewels of the Madonna.

In an ecstasy, Maliella envisions in Gennaro the man who promised her these jewels—Rafaele, and yields herself to Gennaro's embrace.

=== Act 3 ===
A hidden refuge of the Camorrists on the outskirts of Naples

On the left wall is a rough fresco of the Madonna, whose image was borne in procession the previous day. In front of it is a sort of altar.

The Camorrists gather. They are men and women, all the latter of doubtful character. There is singing with dancing—the "Apache," the "Tarantelle." Stella, Concetta, Serena, and Grazia, the dancer, are the principal women. They do not anticipate Maliella's expected arrival with much pleasure. When Rafaele comes in, they ask him what he admires in her. In his answer, "Non sapete... di Maliella" (know you not of Maliella), he tells them her chief charm is that he will be the first man to whom she has yielded herself.

In the midst of an uproar of shouting and dancing, while Rafaele, standing on a table, cracks a whip, Maliella rushes in. In an agony she cries out that, in a trance, she gave herself up to Gennaro. The women laugh derisively at Rafaele, who has just sung of her as being inviolable to all but himself. There is not a touch of mysticism about Rafaele. That she should have confused Gennaro with him, and so have yielded herself to the young blacksmith, does not appeal to him at all. For him she is a plucked rose to be left to wither. Furiously he rejects her, flings her to the ground. The jewels of the Madonna fall from her cloak. They are readily recognized; for they are depicted in the rough fresco on the wall.

Gennaro, who has followed her to the haunt of the Camorrists, enters. He is half mad. Maliella, laughing hysterically, flings the jewels at his feet, shrieking that he stole them for her. The crowd, as superstitious as it is criminal, recoils from both intruders. The women fall to their knees. Rafaele curses the girl. At his command, the band disperses. Maliella goes out to drown herself in the sea. "Madonna dei dolor! Miserere!" (Madonna of our pain, have pity), prays Gennaro. His thoughts revert to his mother. "Deh non piangere, O Mamma mia" (Ah! Weep not, beloved mother mine) . Among the débris he finds a knife and plunges it into his heart.

== Recordings ==
There is an extant recording of the opera, made in 1967, featuring Pauline Tinsley, André Turp and Peter Glossop, conducted by Alberto Erede. It was issued on CD (Bella Voce #107242). A new recording was released in 2016 by Naxos Records.
