= Das Himmelskleid =

Opera by Ermanno Wolf-Ferrari

Das Himmelskleid (La veste di cielo) is a 1927 German-language opera in 3 acts by Ermanno Wolf-Ferrari after "Donkeyskin" by Charles Perrault. It premiered 21 April 1927 at the Nationaltheater, Munich.

== Recording ==
Angelina Ruzzafante, Sibrand Basa, Reinhard Leisenheimer, Hagen Opera Gerhard Markson Marco Polo 3CD 1997
