= Francesco Paolo Frontini =

Italian composer

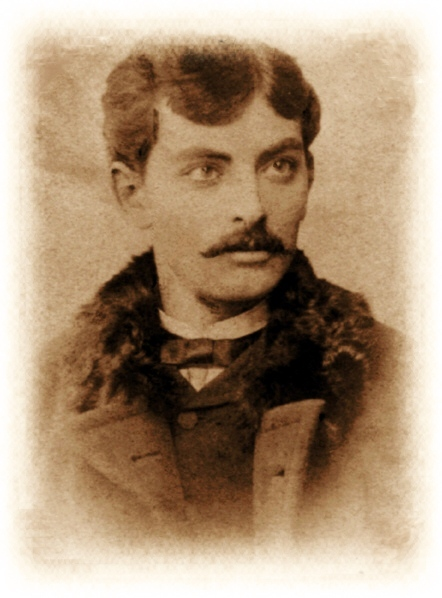
Francesco Paolo Frontini Italian music composer

Francesco Paolo Frontini (Catania, August 6, 1860 – Catania, July 26, 1939) was an Italian composer. He studied music with his father, composer Martino Frontini; he also studied the violin with Santi D'Amico, playing a concert with him at the town concert hall at the age of 13. At 15 his first composition, a Qui tollis, was played at the city cathedral, under the direction of Pietro Antonio Coppola. In 1875 Frontini matriculated at the Palermo Conservatory, where he studied with Pietro Platania; from there he passed to the conservatory in Naples, where he received his diploma in composition under the tuition of Lauro Rossi.

Among his first substantial compositions was a funeral Mass in honor of Pietro Coppola. In 1881 came the premiere of a three-act melodrama, Nella; further operas followed, beginning with Sansone in 1882, Aleramo (based on the legend of Adelasia and Aleramo) in 1883, Fatalità in 1890, Malia (on a libretto of Luigi Capuana) in 1891, and Il Falconiere in 1899. At the same time his lyric poem Medio-Evo received favorable notice from Jules Massenet. He wrote music for the one-act play Vicolo delle belle by Saverio Fiducia, as well as for Antonino Russo Giusti's comedy U Spiridu, which was shown in 1920 at the communal theater under the direction of Gaetano Emanuel Calì. He also wrote a number of religious and secular choral compositions at this time. Frontini also wrote numerous songs, melodies, serenatas and romances; the most popular of these were his Serenata araba, Il piccolo montanaro, and a Triumphal March. In addition to his activities as a composer, he taught music and counterpoint at the Ospizio di Beneficenza.

One of Frontini's chief interests was popular music and song, and he compiled the first collection of Sicilian folk songs in Italy; fifty pieces from this collection were published by Casa Ricordi in 1882; a second collection, titled Natale siciliano, was published in 1893 by De Marchi of Milan.

Frontini died in the city of his birth in 1939.
