= Pietro Antonio Coppola =

Italian composer and conductor

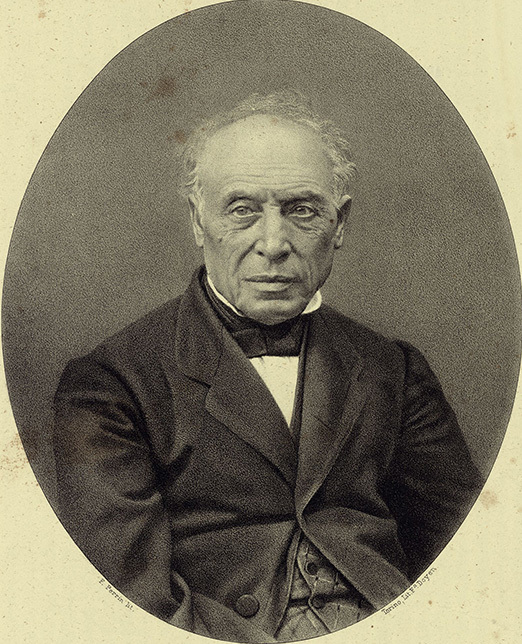
Pietro Antonio Coppola portrayed by Émile Perrin

Pietro Antonio Coppola (11 December 1793 – 13 November 1876) was an Italian composer and conductor. Born in Castrogiovanni, he was trained by his father and at the Naples Conservatory. He is chiefly known for his many operas, of which his most famous, Nina pazza per amore, premiered at the Teatro Valle in Rome in February 1835. While his works have rarely been performed after the 19th century, during his lifetime they enjoyed success in major opera houses in Italy, France, Portugal, and Spain. As a conductor he was particularly active at the Teatro Nacional de São Carlos in Lisbon. He died in Catania at the age of 82.

== Operas ==
- Achille in Sciro (Achilles in Scyrus)
- Nina pazza per amore (Nina Mad for Love)
- Gl'illinesi (The Illinese)
- Il postiglione di Longjumeau (The Postillion of Longjumeau)
