= Ermanno Wolf-Ferrari =

Italian composer (1876–1948)

- Wolf Ferrari, ca. 1947
- Born: 12 January 1876; Venice, Italy
- Died: 21 January 1948 (aged 72); Venice, Italy
- Occupations: Composer; Conductor
- Works: List of operas

Ermanno Wolf-Ferrari (born Ermanno Wolf) (12 January 1876 – 21 January 1948) was an Italian composer and teacher. He is best known for his comic operas such as Il segreto di Susanna (1909). A number of his works were based on plays by Carlo Goldoni, including Le donne curiose (1903), I quatro rusteghi (1906) and Il campiello (1936).

== Life ==
Ermanno Wolf-Ferrari was born in Venice in 1876, the son of German painter August Wolf and Emilia Ferrari, from Venice. He added his mother's maiden name, Ferrari, to his surname in 1895. Although he studied piano from an early age, music was not the primary passion of his young life. As a teenager Wolf-Ferrari wanted to be a painter like his father; he studied intensively in Venice and Rome and travelled abroad to study in Munich. It was there that he decided to concentrate instead on music, taking lessons from Josef Rheinberger. He enrolled at the Munich conservatory and began taking counterpoint and composition classes. These initially casual music classes eventually completely eclipsed his art studies, and music took over Wolf-Ferrari's life. He wrote his first works in the 1890s.

At age 19, Wolf-Ferrari left the conservatory and travelled home to Venice. There he worked as a choral conductor, married, had a son called Federico Wolf-Ferrari, and met both Arrigo Boito and Verdi. In 1900, having failed to have two previous efforts published, Wolf-Ferrari saw the first performance of one of his operas, Cenerentola, based on the story of Cinderella. The opera was a failure in Italy, and the humiliated young composer moved back to Munich. German audiences would prove more appreciative of his work; a revised version of Cenerentola was a hit in Bremen in 1902, while the cantata La vita nuova brought the young composer international fame.

Wolf-Ferrari now began transforming the wild and witty farces of the 18th-century Venetian playwright Carlo Goldoni into comic operas. The resulting works were musically eclectic, melodic, and utterly hilarious; every single one became an international success. In fact, until the outbreak of World War I, Wolf-Ferrari's operas were among the most performed in the world. In 1902, he became professor of composition and director of the Liceo Benedetto Marcello.

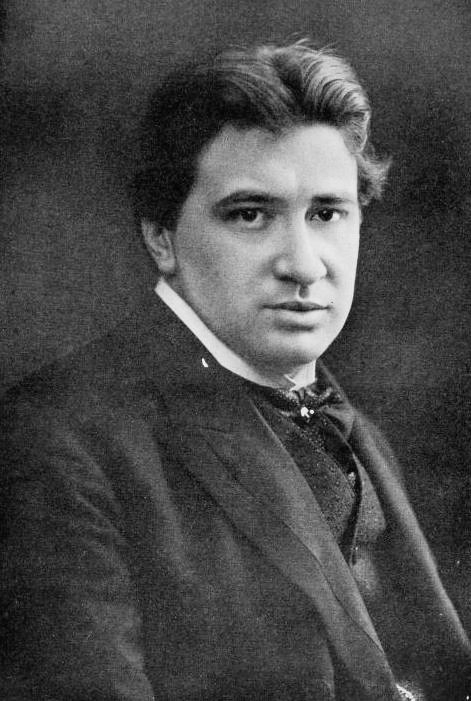
Wolf-Ferrari, c. 1906

In 1911, Wolf-Ferrari tried his hand at full-blooded Verismo with I gioielli della Madonna; a story of passion, sacrilege and madness. It was quite popular in its day and for a period after, especially in Chicago, where the great Polish soprano Rosa Raisa made it a celebrated vehicle. Maria Jeritza (and, later, Florence Easton) triumphed in it at the Metropolitan Opera, in an all-out spectacular production in 1926.

World War I, however, was a nightmare for Wolf-Ferrari. The young composer, who had been dividing his time between Munich and Venice, suddenly found his two countries at war with each other. With the outbreak of the War, he moved to Zürich and composed much less, though he still wrote another comedy, Gli amanti sposi (1916). A new melancholy vein appeared in his post-war work; his operas grew darker and more emotionally complex.

He did not really pick up his rate of output until the 1920s, when he wrote Das Himmelskleid (1925) and Sly (1927), the latter based on William Shakespeare's The Taming of the Shrew. In 1939 he became professor of composition at the Mozarteum in Salzburg. In 1946, he moved again to Zürich before returning to his home city of Venice.

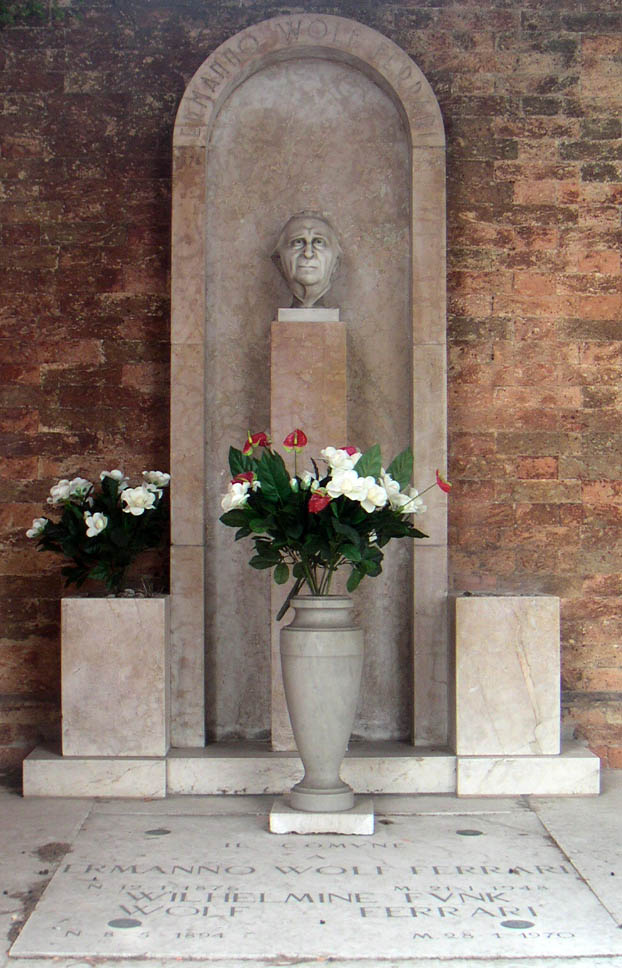
Wolf-Ferrari's grave in the San Michele cemetery

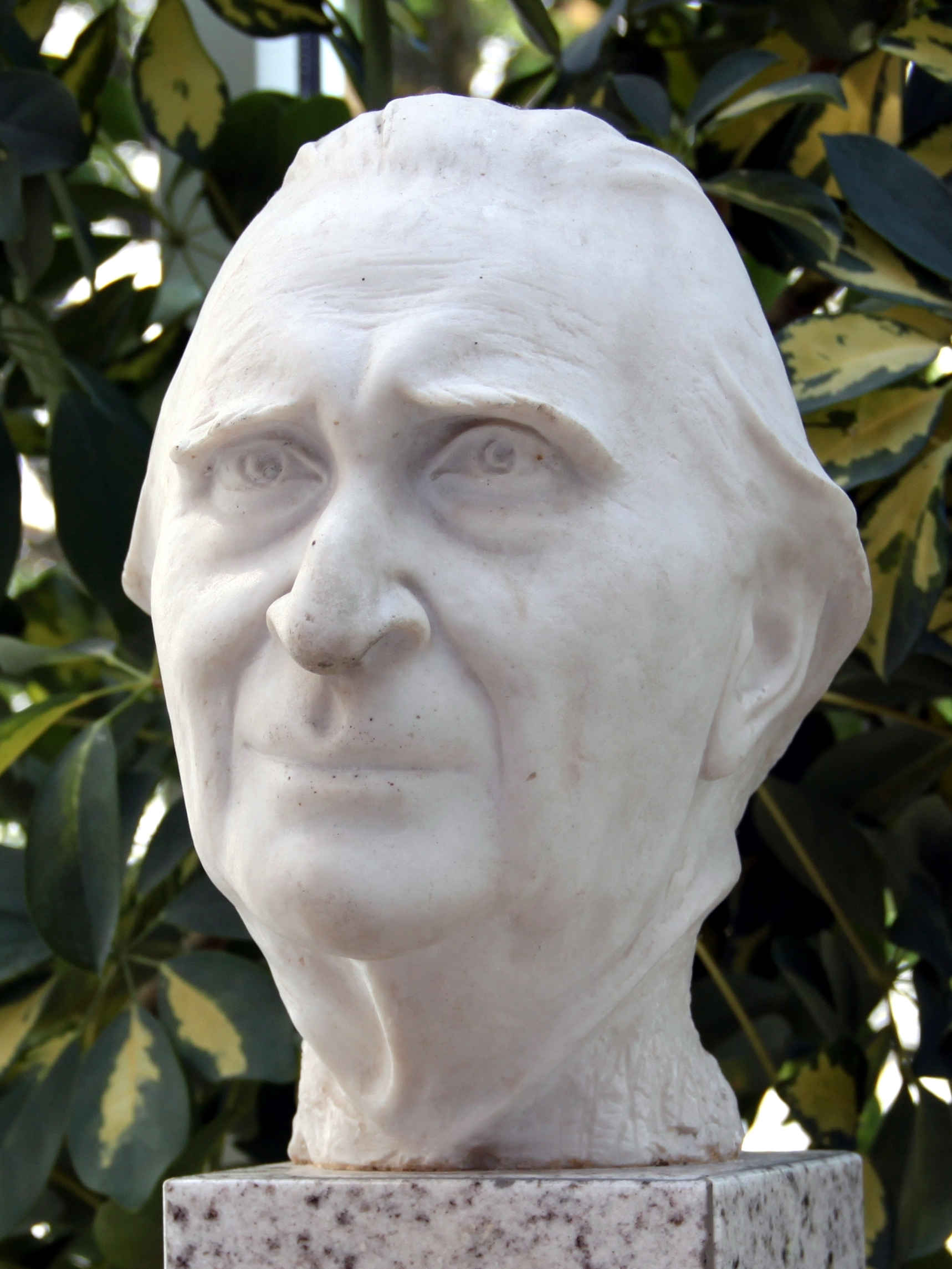
Bust of Wolf-Ferrari in the Wolf-Ferrari-Haus, Ottobrunn

Wolf-Ferrari died in Venice at Palazzo Malipiero and is buried in the San Michele cemetery on Island of San Michele.

== Music ==
As well as his operas, Wolf-Ferrari wrote a number of instrumental works, mainly at the very beginning and very end of his career. Only his violin concerto has ever been performed with anything approaching regularity, though he also wrote Idillio-concertino (essentially a chamber symphony), various pieces of chamber music including a piano quintet and two piano trios, three violin sonatas and a number of works for the organ amongst others. In recent years, a recovery of his instrumental music has been underway by the pianist Costantino Catena, who has recorded his piano works, sonatas for violin and piano, sonata for cello and piano and piano quintet for the Brilliant Classics label.

Wolf-Ferrari's work is not performed very widely (with the exception of several of his overtures and his Jewels of the Madonna intermezzo), although he is generally thought of as probably the finest writer of Italian comic opera of his time. His works often recall the opera buffa of the 18th century, although he also wrote more ambitious works in the manner of Pietro Mascagni, which are thought of less well.

== Works ==
=== Operas ===
See List of operas by Ermanno Wolf-Ferrari

=== Other vocal works ===
- La sulamite (canto biblico), Op. 2 (1898)
- 8 cori (unaccompanied) (1898)
- Talitha Kumi (La figlia di Giaro) (oratorium, Bible: Mark), Op. 3 (1900)
- La vita nuova (cantata, after Dante), Op. 9 (1901)
- 4 Rispetti, Op. 11 (1902)
- 4 Rispetti, Op. 12 (1902)
- Canzoniere (Tuscan trad.) Op. 17 (1936)
- La passione (Tuscan trad.) Op. 21 (for chorus, 1939; for voice and piano, 1940),

=== Orchestral ===
- Serenade for Strings in E flat major
- Idillio-concertino in A major for Oboe and small orchestra, Op. 15 (1932)
- Suite-concertino in F major for Bassoon and small orchestra, Op. 16 (1933)
- Venezianische Suite (Suite Veneziana) in A minor, Op.18
- Triptychon (Trittico) op.19
- Divertimento in D major op.20
- Arabesken (Arabeschi) für Orchester op.22 (after a theme of Ettore Tito)
- Violin Concerto in D, Op. 26 Guila Bustabo in ammirazione (1943)
- Sinfonia Brevis in E flat major op.28
- Cello Concerto in C, Op. 31 Invocazione (1945)
- Concertino in A flat major for English horn and small orchestra, Op. 34 (1947)

=== Chamber music ===
- String Sextet in C minor (1894/95, also as a string trio)
- Sinfonia da Camera Op. 8 (1901)
- Sonata No.1 for Violin & Piano in G minor, Op.1 (1895)
- Sonata No.2 for Violin & Piano in A minor, Op.10 (1901)
- Sonata No.3 for Violin & Piano in E major, Op.27 (1943)
- Sonata for Cello & Piano in G major, Op.30 (1945)
- String Duo in G minor for Violin & Cello, Op.33b (1946)
- String Duo, "Introduzione e Balletto", for Violin & Cello, Op.35 (1948)
- String Trio in B minor for Violin, Viola & Cello, WoO. (1894)
- String Trio in A minor for Violin, Viola & Cello, Op.32 (1945)
- String Quartet in E minor, Op.23 (1940)
- String Quintet in C major for 2 Violins, 2 Violas & Cello, Op.24 (1942)
- Piano Trio No.1 in D major, Op.5 (1898)
- Piano Trio No.2 in F♯ major, Op.7 (1900)
- Piano Trio "Sonata" for in F major for 2 Violins & Piano, Op.25 (1943)
- Piano Quintet in D♭ major, Op.6 (1901)

== Sources ==
Wolf-Ferrari, Ermanno by John C G Waterhouse, in The New Grove Dictionary of Music and Musicians, ed. Stanley Sadie (London, 1980) ISBN 0-333-23111-2

Wolf-Ferrari, Ermanno by John C G Waterhouse, in The New Grove Dictionary of Opera, ed. Stanley Sadie (London, 1992) ISBN 0-333-73432-7
