= Aida discography =

Recordings of the opera by Giuseppe Verdi

This is a partial discography of Giuseppe Verdi's opera, Aida. It was first performed at the Khedivial Opera House in Cairo on December 24, 1871.

== Audio recordings ==
Year	Cast (Aida, Amneris, Radamès, Amonasro, Ramfis)	Conductor, Opera house and orchestra	Label/Notes
1906-1907	Teresa Chelotti/Elvira Magliulo; Vittoria Colombati; Orazio Cosentino; Giovanni Novelli; Alfredo Brondi	Carlo Sabajno; Teatro alla Scala orchestra and chorus	LP: Zonophone; Cat: 12664/78; Cat: 24017; Cat: 24019/25
1912	Lya Remondini; Fanny Anitúa; Giuseppe Armanini; Cesare Formichi; Vincenzo Bettoni; These roles are also sung by other singers	Conductor unknown Orchestra Sinfonica e Coro	LP: Columbia D Cat: 4486-4502; LP: Columbia; Cat: 5558-5574
1919	Valentina Bartolomasi; Rosita Pagani; Enrico Trentini; Adolfo Pacini; Guido Fernandez	Carlo Sabajno; Teatro alla Scala orchestra and chorus	LP: Società Nazionale del Grammofono; Cat: S 5150-5180
1928	Giannina Arangi-Lombardi; Maria Capuana; Aroldo Lindi; Armando Borgioli; Tancredi Pasero	Lorenzo Molajoli; Teatro alla Scala orchestra and chorus	CD: Arkadia; Cat: 78044
1928	Dusolina Giannini; Irene Minghini-Cattaneo; Aureliano Pertile; Giovanni Inghilleri; Luigi Manfrini	Carlo Sabajno; Teatro alla Scala orchestra and chorus	CD: Romophone; Cat: 89004-2
1946	Maria Caniglia; Ebe Stignani; Beniamino Gigli; Gino Bechi; Tancredi Pasero	Tullio Serafin; Teatro dell'Opera di Roma orchestra and chorus	CD: EMI Classics; Cat: 67487
1949	Herva Nelli; Eva Gustavson; Richard Tucker; Giuseppe Valdengo; Norman Scott	Arturo Toscanini, NBC Symphony Orchestra, Robert Shaw Chorale (Concert performance, recorded live, 26 March and 2 April 1949)	LP: RCA Victrola; VICS-6113(e); CD: RCA Victor; Cat: 67893 (see video below)
1951	Maria Callas; Oralia Domínguez; Mario Del Monaco; Giuseppe Taddei; Roberto Silva	Oliviero De Fabritiis; Palacio de Bellas Artes orchestra and chorus Callas interpolates an E♭_{6} at the and of act 2, "Gloria all'Egitto"	CD: EMI Classics; Cat: 62678
1952	Renata Tebaldi; Ebe Stignani; Mario Del Monaco; Aldo Protti; Dario Caselli	Alberto Erede; Accademia Nazionale di Santa Cecilia orchestra and chorus	CD: Decca; Cat: 440239; Naxos Historical; Cat: 8.110129-30
1953	Maria Callas; Giulietta Simionato; Kurt Baum; Jess Walters; Giulio Neri	John Barbirolli; Royal Opera House orchestra and chorus	CD: Testament Cat: SBT2 1355; Myto Cat: MCD00242; Legato Classics Cat: LCD-187-2
1955	Mary Curtis Verna; Oralia Domínguez; Umberto Borsò; Norman Scott	Franco Capuana; La Fenice orchestra and chorus	CD: Remmington; Cat: 20027
1955	Maria Callas; Fedora Barbieri; Richard Tucker; Tito Gobbi; Giuseppe Modesti	Tullio Serafin; Teatro alla Scala orchestra and chorus	CD: EMI Classics; Cat: 563162; CD: Naxos Historical; Cat: 8.111240-41
1955	Zinka Milanov; Fedora Barbieri; Jussi Björling; Leonard Warren; Boris Christoff	Jonel Perlea; Teatro dell'Opera di Roma orchestra and chorus	LP: RCA Victrola; Cat: VIC-6119; CD: RCA Red Seal; Cat: 8883729002
1956	Antonietta Stella; Giulietta Simionato; Giuseppe Di Stefano; Giangiacomo Guelfi; Nicola Zaccaria	Antonino Votto; Teatro alla Scala orchestra and chorus	CD: Great Opera Performances; Cat: GOP66353
1956	Mary Curtis Verna; Franco Corelli; Miriam Pirazzini; Giangiacomo Guelfi; Giulio Neri	Angelo Questa; RAI orchestra and chorus	CD: Cetra; Cat: 662118
1958?	Anna de Cavalieri, Ira Malaniuk, Aldo Bertocci, Scipio Colombo, Paolo Dari	Ernesto Barbini, Teatro dell'Opera di Roma Orchestra & Chorus	LP: MMS; Digital audio: Various platforms
1959	Renata Tebaldi; Giulietta Simionato; Carlo Bergonzi; Cornell MacNeil; Arnold van Mill	Herbert von Karajan; Vienna Philharmonic orchestra Vienna Friends of Music Society chorus	CD: Decca; Cat: DEC 2894670232
1962	Leontyne Price; Rita Gorr; Jon Vickers; Robert Merrill; Giorgio Tozzi	Georg Solti; Teatro dell'Opera di Roma orchestra and chorus (1963 Grammy Award for Best Opera Recording)	LP: RCA Victor, Cat: LSC-6158; CD: Decca; Cat: 4607652
1963	Leontyne Price; Giulietta Simionato; Dimiter Uzunov; Ettore Bastianini; Walter Kreppel	Lovro von Matačić; Vienna State Opera orchestra and chorus	3 x LP: Electrecord; Cat: ELE 02966; Cat: ELE 02967; Cat: ELE 02968
1966	Leyla Gencer; Fiorenza Cossotto; Carlo Bergonzi; Anselmo Colzani; Bonaldo Giaiotti	Franco Capuana; Verona Arena orchestra and chorus	CD: Giuseppe di Stefano; Cat: GDS 21032
1967	Birgit Nilsson; Grace Bumbry; Franco Corelli; Mario Sereni; Bonaldo Giaiotti	Zubin Mehta; Teatro dell'Opera di Roma orchestra and chorus	CD: EMI Classics; Cat: 58645
1970	Leontyne Price; Grace Bumbry; Plácido Domingo; Sherrill Milnes; Ruggero Raimondi	Erich Leinsdorf; London Symphony Orchestra; John Alldis choir	LP: RCA Red Seal; Cat: LSC-3275; CD: RCA Red Seal; Cat: 88985434852
1972	Martina Arroyo; Fiorenza Cossotto; Plácido Domingo; Piero Cappuccilli; Nicolai Ghiaurov	Claudio Abbado; Teatro alla Scala orchestra and chorus	Audio CD: Opera d'Oro; Cat: 7002
1973	Gwyneth Jones; Viorica Cortez; Plácido Domingo; Eugene Holmes; Bonaldo Giaiotti	Riccardo Muti; Vienna State Opera orchestra and chorus	Audio CD: BellaVoce; Cat: BLV 107.209
1974	Montserrat Caballé; Fiorenza Cossotto; Plácido Domingo; Piero Cappuccilli; Nicolai Ghiaurov	Riccardo Muti; Philharmonia Orchestra; Royal Opera House chorus	CD: EMI Classics; Cat: 5676132
1976	Leontyne Price; Marilyn Horne; Plácido Domingo; Cornell MacNeil; Bonaldo Giaiotti	James Levine; Metropolitan Opera orchestra and chorus	Streaming audio: Met Opera on Demand
1979	Mirella Freni; Agnes Baltsa; José Carreras; Piero Cappuccilli; Ruggero Raimondi	Herbert von Karajan; Vienna Philharmonic Orchestra; Vienna State Opera chorus	CD: EMI Classics; Cat: 81877
1982	Júlia Várady; Stefania Toczyska; Luciano Pavarotti; Dietrich Fischer-Dieskau; Matti Salminen	Daniel Barenboim; Deutsche Oper Berlin orchestra and chorus	CD: Ponto; Cat: PO-1028
1983	Katia Ricciarelli; Elena Obraztsova; Plácido Domingo; Leo Nucci; Nicolai Ghiaurov	Claudio Abbado; Teatro alla Scala orchestra and chorus	CD: Deutsche Grammophon; Cat: 4100922
1986	Maria Chiara; Ghena Dimitrova; Luciano Pavarotti; Leo Nucci; Paata Burchuladze	Lorin Maazel; Teatro alla Scala orchestra and chorus	CD: Decca; Cat: 417439
1991	Aprile Millo; Dolora Zajick; Plácido Domingo; James Morris; Samuel Ramey	James Levine; Metropolitan Opera orchestra and chorus	CD: Sony; Cat: 88697527722
1994	Maria Dragoni; Barbara Dever; Kristján Jóhannsson; Mark Rucker; Francesco Ellero d'Artegna	Rico Saccani; RTÉ National Symphony Orchestra	CD: Naxos; Cat: 8660033-34
2001	Cristina Gallardo-Domâs; Olga Borodina; Vincenzo La Scola; Thomas Hampson; Matti Salminen	Nikolaus Harnoncourt; Vienna Philharmonic Orchestra; Arnold Schoenberg Choir	CD: Teldec; Cat: 85402
2015	Anja Harteros, Ekaterina Semenchuk, Jonas Kaufmann, Ludovic Tézier, Erwin Schrott	Antonio Pappano, Accademia di Santa Cecilia orchestra and chorus	CD: Warner Classics; Cat:2564610663

== Video recordings ==
Year	Cast (Aida, Amneris, Radamès, Amonasro, Ramfis)	Conductor, Opera house and orchestra	Label
1949	Herva Nelli; Eva Gustavson; Richard Tucker; Giuseppe Valdengo; Norman Scott	Arturo Toscanini, NBC Symphony Orchestra, Robert Shaw Chorale (Concert performance, recorded live, 26 March and 2 April 1949)	DVD: Testament; Cat: SBDVD1005 (see audio above)
1961	Gabriella Tucci; Giulietta Simionato; Mario Del Monaco; Aldo Protti; Paolo Washington	Franco Capuana; NHK Symphony Orchestra (Recorded in Tokyo)	Video Artists Int'l; Cat: DVDVAI4420
1966	Leyla Gencer; Fiorenza Cossotto; Carlo Bergonzi; Anselmo Colzani; Bonaldo Giaiotti,	Franco Capuana; Verona Arena orchestra and chorus (Recorded on 3 August 1966)	Hardy Classic; Cat: HCD 4010
1981	Margaret Price; Stefania Toczyska; Luciano Pavarotti; Simon Estes; Kurt Rydl	Garcia Navarro; San Francisco Opera orchestra and chorus	Kultur International; Cat: 3984 22366 2
1986	Maria Chiara; Ghena Dimitrova; Luciano Pavarotti; Juan Pons; Nicolai Ghiaurov	Lorin Maazel; Teatro alla Scala orchestra and chorus	Image Entertainment; Cat: 0014381578522; Arthaus Musik; Cat: 100059
1989	Aprile Millo; Dolora Zajick; Plácido Domingo; Sherrill Milnes; Paata Burchuladze	James Levine; Metropolitan Opera Orchestra, Chorus, and Ballet (Production: Sonja Frisell; recorded live, 7 October)	Streaming video: Met Opera on Demand; DVD: Deutsche Grammophon; Cat: 00440 073 0019
2001	Adina Aaron; Kate Aldrich; Scott Piper; Giuseppe Garra; Enrico Iori	Massimiliano Stefanelli; Arturo Toscanini Philharmonic Orchestra (Production: Franco Zeffirelli; recorded live, 27 January, Teatro Giuseppe Verdi, Busseto)	TDK; Cat: DV-AIDDBM
2004	Norma Fantini; Ildikó Komlósi; Marco Berti; Mark S. Doss; Orlin Anastassov	Kazushi Ōno; Symphony Orchestra and Choir of La Monnaie	Opus Arte; Cat: B000FNUDW2
2006	Nina Stemme, Luciana d'Intino, Salvatore Licitra, Juan Pons, Matti Salminen	Ádám Fischer, Zurich Opera Orchestra & Chorus (Stage director: Nicolas Joel; recorded live, May)	DVD: BelAir Classiques
2007	Violeta Urmana; Ildikó Komlósi; Roberto Alagna; Carlo Guelfi; Giorgio Giuseppini	Riccardo Chailly; Teatro alla Scala orchestra and chorus (Live recording December 2006)	Decca; Cat: 074 3209
2009	Tatiana Serjan, Iano Tamar, Rubens Pelizzari, Iain Paterson, Tigran Martirossian	Carlo Rizzi, Bregenz Festival, Vienna Symphony (Stage director: Graham Vick; recorded live, 24 July)	Streaming video: Unitel Classica; Blu-ray: ArkivMusic
2012	Liudmyla Monastyrska, Olga Borodina, Roberto Alagna, George Gagnidze, Stefan Kocán	Fabio Luisi, Metropolitan Opera Orchestra, Chorus, & Ballet (Producer: Sonja Frisell; recorded live, 15 December)	HD video: Met Opera on Demand
2018	Anna Netrebko, Anita Rachvelishvili, Aleksandrs Antoņenko, Quinn Kelsey, Dmitry Belosselskiy	Nicola Luisotti, Metropolitan Opera Orchestra, Chorus, & Ballet (Producer: Sonja Frisell; recorded live, 6 October)	HD video: Met Opera on Demand
2022	Krassimira Stoyanova, Oksana Volkova, Francesco Meli, Quinn Kelsey, Georg Zeppenfeld	Christian Thielemann, Semperoper, Dresden (Director: Katharina Thalbach; recorded live, March)	Streaming video: Arte
2022	Elena Stikhina, Agnieszka Rehlis, Francesco Meli, Ludovic Tézier, Soloman Howard	Antonio Pappano, Orchestra of the Royal Opera House, Royal Opera Chorus (Director: Robert Carsen; recorded live, 3, 6, and 12 October)	Royal Ballet and Opera Stream; Blu-ray: Opus Arte; Cat: OABD7321D
2025	Angel Blue, Judit Kutasi, Piotr Beczała, Quinn Kelsey, Morris Robinson	Yannick Nézet-Séguin, Metropolitan Opera Orchestra, Chorus, & Ballet (Producer: Michael Mayer; recorded live, 25 January)	HD video: Met Opera on Demand
