= Andrea Chénier discography =

This is a list of recordings of Andrea Chénier, an opera by the composer Umberto Giordano, which was first performed at the Teatro alla Scala, Milan, on 28 March 1896.

== Audio recordings ==
Year	Cast (Andrea Chénier, Maddalena de Coigny, Carlo Gérard)	Conductor, Opera House and Orchestra	Label
1920	Luigi Lupato; Valentina Bartolomasi; Adolfo Pacini	Carlo Sabajno; Teatro alla Scala orchestra and chorus	LP: Società Nazionale del Grammofono; Cat: S 5520-5552
1931	Luigi Marini; Lina Bruna Rasa; Carlo Galeffi	Lorenzo Molajoli; Teatro alla Scala orchestra and chorus	CD: Naxos Records; Cat: 8.110066-67
1941	Beniamino Gigli; Maria Caniglia; Gino Bechi	Oliviero De Fabritiis; Teatro alla Scala orchestra and chorus	CD:EMI Classics; Cat: 69996
1955	Mario Del Monaco; Maria Callas; Aldo Protti	Antonino Votto; Teatro alla Scala orchestra and chorus (Live recording)	CD:EMI Classics; Cat: 67913
1957	Mario Del Monaco; Renata Tebaldi; Ettore Bastianini	Gianandrea Gavazzeni; Accademia Nazionale di Santa Cecilia orchestra and chorus	Decca; Cat: 425407
1957	Richard Tucker; Zinka Milanov; Leonard Warren	Fausto Cleva; Metropolitan Opera orchestra and chorus	Streaming audio: Met Opera on Demand
1958	Richard Tucker; Mary Curtis-Verna; Mario Sereni	Fausto Cleva; Metropolitan Opera orchestra and chorus	Book of the Month Club; Cat: MO 826
1960	Franco Corelli; Renata Tebaldi; Ettore Bastianini	Lovro von Matačić; Vienna Philharmonic Orchestra; Vienna State Opera chorus	CD:Opera d'Oro; Cat: OPD1303
1963	Franco Corelli; Antonietta Stella; Mario Sereni	Gabriele Santini; Rome Opera House orchestra and chorus	CD:EMI Classics; Cat: 58676
1976	Plácido Domingo; Renata Scotto; Sherrill Milnes	James Levine; National Philharmonic Orchestra; John Alldis Choir	LP: RCA Red Seal; Cat: ARL3-2046; CD: RCA Victor Red Seal; Cat: 74321 39499 2
1984	Luciano Pavarotti; Montserrat Caballé; Leo Nucci	Riccardo Chailly; National Philharmonic Orchestra; Welsh National Opera chorus	CD:Decca; Cat: 410117
1986	José Carreras; Éva Marton; Giorgio Zancanaro	Giuseppe Patanè; Hungarian State Opera orchestra Hungarian State R/TV Chorus; Hungarian R/TV Children's chorus	CD:Sony Classical; Cat: 42369
2014	Marcelo Álvarez; Patricia Racette; Željko Lučić	Gianandrea Noseda; Metropolitan Opera orchestra and chorus	Streaming audio: Met Opera on Demand

== Video recordings ==
year	Cast Andrea Chénier, (Maddalena de Coigny, Carlo Gérard)	Conductor, Opera house, orchestra, chorus (Production details)	label
1961	Mario del Monaco, Renata Tebaldi, Aldo Protti	Franco Capuana, NHK Symphony Orchestra, Italian Opera Chorus (Recorded live, 1 Oct 1961, Tokyo Bunka Kaikan)	DVD: VAI cat.: 4419
1973	Franco Corelli, Celestina Casapietra, Piero Cappuccilli	Bruno Bartoletti, Milan RAI Orchestra & Chorus	DVD: Hardy Classic Video cat.: HCD 4008
1981	Plácido Domingo, Gabriela Beňačková, Piero Cappuccilli	Nello Santi, Vienna State Opera Orchestra & Chorus	DVD: Deutsche Grammophon cat.: 00440 073 4070
1985	Plácido Domingo, Anna Tomowa-Sintow, Giorgio Zancanaro	Julius Rudel, Royal Opera House Orchestra & Chorus (Set & costume designer: William Orlandi; recorded live, 1985)	DVD: Kultur, C Major
1985	José Carreras, Éva Marton, Piero Cappuccilli	Ricardo Chailly, La Scala Orchestra & Chorus (Producer: Lamberto Puggelli; recorded live, July 1985)	DVD: NVC Arts, Kultur, Online
1996	Luciano Pavarotti, Maria Guleghina, Juan Pons	James Levine, Metropolitan Opera Orchestra & Chorus (Production: Nicolas Joël; recorded live, 15 October 1996)	SD video: Met Opera on Demand or DVD
2006	José Cura, Maria Guleghina, Carlo Guelfi	Carlo Rizzi, Teatro Comunale di Bologna Orchestra & Chorus (Stage director & designer: Giancarlo Del Monaco; recorded live, January 2006)	DVD: TDK, Online
2015	Jonas Kaufmann, Eva-Maria Westbroek, Željko Lučić	Antonio Pappano, Royal Opera House Orchestra & Chorus (Director: David McVicar; recorded live, 29 January 2015)	HD video: Warner Classics, RBO Stream
2017	Jonas Kaufmann, Anja Harteros, George Petean	Marco Armiliato, Bavarian State Opera, Bavarian State Orchestra, Bavarian State Opera Chorus (Stage director: Philipp Stölzl; recorded live, December 2017)	HD video: BSO, Online
2025	Piotr Beczała, Sonya Yoncheva, Igor Golovatenko	Daniele Rustioni, Metropolitan Opera Orchestra & Chorus (Production: Nicolas Joël; recorded live, 13 December 2025)	HD video: Met Opera on Demand
