= List of Argentine operas =

This is a list of operas by Argentine composers. Argentina's first native born opera composer was Francisco Hargreaves (1849–1900) who composed La gatta bianca (1875) and Los estudiantes de Bologna (1897), followed by Zenón Rolón (1856–1902) who composed several operas as well as operettas and zarzuelas. The works of many of the composers from this generation were first performed outside Argentina. Native Argentine opera was to develop much more with the massive European (mainly Italian) immigration in the late 19th century and even more with the opening of the Teatro Colón in 1908 where most of the 20th century operas listed here had their world premieres.

Some of the first operas to treat Argentine subjects or national themes were Arturo Berutti's Pampa (1897) based on the life of Juan Moreira and Yupanki (1899) based on the life of Inca warrior Manqu Inka Yupanki. Also notable in this genre were Felipe Boero's Tucumán (1918) set during the Battle of Tucumán and El matrero (1929). Considered by many to be the quintessential Argentine opera, El matrero had a libretto based on gaucho folk tradition and incorporated Argentine folk melodies and a traditional gaucho dance. The Spanish playwright Federico García Lorca was also the inspiration for several Argentine operas. His plays, La zapatera prodigiosa and Bodas de sangre, were the basis of operas by Juan José Castro, while Osvaldo Golijov's 2003 opera Ainadamar is based on events in the playwright's life.

== List ==
=== 19th century ===
- Il fidanzato del mare by Héctor Panizza; opera in one act to a libretto by Romeo Carugati; premiered 15 August 1897, Teatro de la Ópera, Buenos Aires

=== 20th century ===
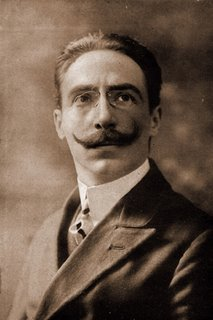
Héctor Panizza (1875-1967)

- Medioevo latino by Héctor Panizza; opera (triptych) in three acts to a libretto by Luigi Illica; premiered 17 November 1900, Teatro Politeama Genovese, Genoa
- Aurora by Héctor Panizza; opera in three acts to a libretto by Luigi Illica after Hector Quesada; premiered 5 September 1908, Teatro Colón, Buenos Aires (revised version in Spanish premiered 1945)
- Tucumán by Felipe Boero; opera in one act to a libretto by Leopoldo Díaz; premiered 29 June 1918, Teatro Colón, Buenos Aires
- Ariana y Dionysos by Felipe Boero; opera in one act to a libretto by Leopoldo Díaz; premiered 7 August 1920, Teatro Colón, Buenos Aires
- Raquela by Felipe Boero; opera in one act to a libretto by Víctor Mercadante; premiered 26 June 1923, Teatro Colón, Buenos Aires
- Las Bacantes by Felipe Boero; opera in three acts to a libretto after Euripides, translated by Leopoldo Longhi; premiered 19 September 1925, Teatro Colón, Buenos Aires
- Ollantay by Constantino Gaito; opera in a prologue and three acts to a libretto by Víctor Mercante; premiered 23 July 1926, Teatro Colón, Buenos Aires
- El matrero by Felipe Boero; opera in three acts to a libretto by Yamandú Rodríguez; premiered 12 July 1929, Teatro Colón, Buenos Aires
- Siripo by Felipe Boero; opera in three acts to a libretto by Luis Bayón-Herrera, after Manuel de Lavardén; premiered 8 June 1937, Teatro Colón, Buenos Aires
- Chasca by Enrique Mario Casella, opera in one act, libretto by the composer; premiered 28 August 1939, Teatro Alberdi, Tucumán
- Bizancio by Héctor Panizza; opera (poema dramático) in three acts to a libretto by Gustavo Macchi after Auguste Bailly, premiered 25 July 1939, Teatro Colón, Buenos Aires Buenos Aires
- La zapatera prodigosa by Juan José Castro; opera in three acts after Federico García Lorca; premiered 1943, Uruguay
- Proserpina y el extranjero by Juan José Castro; opera in three acts after Omar del Carlo; premiered 17 March 1952, La Scala, Milan
- Zincalí by Felipe Boero; opera in three acts to a libretto by Arturo Capdevila; premiered 12 November 1954, Teatro Colón, Buenos Aires
- Bodas di sangre by Juan José Castro; opera in three acts after Federico García Lorca; premiered 9 August 1956, Teatro Colón, Buenos Aires
- Don Rodrigo by Alberto Ginastera; opera in three acts to a libretto by Alejandro Casona; premiered 24 July 1964, Teatro Colón, Buenos Aires
- Bomarzo by Alberto Ginastera; opera in two acts to a libretto by Manuel Mujica Láinez; premiered 19 May 1967, Washington, D.C.
- María de Buenos Aires by Ástor Piazzolla; opera (tango operita) to a libretto by Horacio Ferrer; premiered May 1968, Sala Planeta, Buenos Aires
- Beatrix Cenci by Alberto Ginastera; opera in two acts to libretto by the composer, William Shand, and A. Girri; premiered 10 September 1971, John F. Kennedy Center for the Performing Arts, Washington, D.C.
- Barabbas by Alberto Ginastera; opera after Michel de Ghelderode (begun 1977, unfinished)

=== 21st century ===
- Ainadamar by Osvaldo Golijov; opera in three images to a libretto by David Henry Hwang; premiered 10 August 2003, Tanglewood Music Festival (revised version premiered 30 July 2005, Santa Fe Opera)
- "Eterna flotación: Los Monstruito'" by Oscar Edelstein, commissioned by the Centre for Experimentation (CETC) of Teatro Colón, premiered in Teatro Margarita Xirgu (Buenos Aires), on 17, 20, 21, 22 and 23 September 2006. The opera is divided into two acts each with eleven moments, for chamber orchestra, electro-acoustics, 3 leads & chorus, with the libretto adapted by the composer based on poems by Rodolfo Enrique Fogwill.

== See also ==
- Music of Argentina
