= Lorenzo Molajoli =

Italian conductor

Lorenzo Molajoli (1868 - 4 April 1939) was an Italian opera conductor who was active in recording during the 1920s and 1930s. His wife Emma was a noted opera singing teacher.

The facts surrounding Molajoli's career are obscure. He was born in Rome in 1868 and studied there at the Accademia di Santa Cecilia. His career began in 1891, and it would appear that much of his career prior to the First World War was spent in both North and South America, South Africa and various provincial Italian opera houses. Claims have been made that Molajoli conducted at La Scala in the inter-war years, but there is no published documentation to substantiate this assumption. What can be established is that he served with considerable distinction as the house conductor in Milan for Columbia Records, recording complete operas and accompanying a large number of singers, in addition to making recordings of a number of operatic overtures. Molajoli conducted twenty complete or abridged operas for Columbia between 1928 and 1932, including the first complete recordings of Rossini's The Barber of Seville, Ponchielli's La Gioconda and Boito's Mefistofele. His concise, trenchant and swiftly paced conducting style is in the tradition of his compatriots Arturo Toscanini and Ettore Panizza. A number of his complete opera recordings have been released on CD on Naxos and other labels. He died in Milan on 4 April 1939.

== Discography ==
- 1927 & 30 - Rigoletto (Verdi) - Riccardo Stracciari, Mercedes Capsir, Dino Borgioli: La Scala Opera Orchestra and Chorus
- 1928 - La Bohème (Puccini) - Rosetta Pampanini, Luigi Marini, Gino Vanelli, Luba Mirella: La Scala Opera Orchestra and Chorus
- 1928 - Aida (Verdi) - Giannina Arangi-Lombardi, Aroldo Lindi, Maria Capuana: La Scala Opera Orchestra and Chorus
- 1928 - La Traviata (Verdi) - Mercedes Capsir, Lionello Cecil, Carlo Galeffi: La Scala Opera Orchestra and Chorus
- 1929 - Madama Butterfly (Puccini) - Rosetta Pampanini, Alessandro Granda, Gino Vanelli: La Scala Opera Orchestra and Chorus
- 1929 - Tosca (Puccini) - Bianca Scacciati, Alessandro Granda, Enrico Molinari: La Scala Opera Orchestra and Chorus
- 1929 - Il Barbiere di Siviglia (Rossini) - Riccardo Stracciari, Mercedes Capsir, Dino Borgioli: La Scala Opera Orchestra and Chorus
- 1930 - Le furie di Arlecchino (Lualdi) - Maria Zamboni, Enzo de Muro Lomanto: La Scala Opera Orchestra and Chorus
- 1930 - Ernani (Verdi) - Antonio Melandri, Iva Pacetti, Gino Vanelli: La Scala Opera Orchestra and Chorus
- 1930 - La favorita (Donizetti) - Carmelo Maugeli, Giuseppina Zinetti, Christy Solari: La Scala Opera Orchestra and Chorus
- 1930 - Pagliacci (Leoncavallo) - Francesco Merli, Rosetta Pampanini, Carlo Galeffi: La Scala Opera Orchestra and Chorus
- 1930 - Cavalleria Rusticana (Mascagni) - Giannina Arangi-Lombardi, Antonio Melandri: La Scala Opera Orchestra and Chorus
- 1930 - Il Trovatore (Verdi) - Francesco Merli, Bianca Scacciati, Giuseppina Zinetti, Enrico Molinari: La Scala Opera Orchestra and Chorus
- 1930 & 31 - Don Pasquale (Donizetti) - Attilio Giuliani, Ines Alfani-Tellini, Christy Solari: La Scala Opera Orchestra and Chorus
- 1930 & 31 - L'elisir d'amore (Donizetti) - Ines Alfani-Tellini, Christy Solari, Edoardo Faticanti: La Scala Opera Orchestra and Chorus
- 1931 - Andrea Chenier (Giordano) - Luigi Marini, Lina Bruna Rasa, Carlo Galeffi: La Scala Opera Orchestra and Chorus
- 1931 - Mefistofele (Boito) - Nazzareno de Angelis, Antonio Melandri, Mafalda Favero, Giannina Arangi-Lombardi: La Scala Opera Orchestra and Chorus
- 1931 - Fedora (Giordano) - Gilda Dalla Rizza, Antonio Melandri, Emilio Ghirardini, Luba Mirella, Eugenio Dall'Argine: La Scala Opera Orchestra and Chorus
- 1931 - La Gioconda (Ponchielli) - Giannina Arangi-Lombardi, Ebe Stignani, Alessandro Granda, Gaetano Viviani, Corrado Zambelli: La Scala Opera Orchestra and Chorus
- 1931 - Manon Lescaut (Puccini) - Maria Zamboni, Francesco Merli, Enrico Molinari; La Scala Opera Orchestra and Chorus
- 1932 - Carmen (Bizet) - Aurora Buades, Aureliano Pertile, Ines Alfani-Tellini, Benvenuto Franci: La Scala Opera Orchestra and Chorus
- 1932 - Falstaff (Verdi) - Giacomo Rimini, Pia Tassinari, Roberto D'Alessio, Emilio Ghirardini, Aurora Buades; La Scala Opera Orchestra and Chorus
- 1933 - Lucia di Lammermoor (Donizetti) - Mercedes Capsir, Enzo de Muro Lomanto, Enrico Molinari: La Scala Opera Orchestra and Chorus
