= Dimitri Platanias =

Greek operatic baritone (born 1970)

Dimitri Platanias (born 4 December 1970) is a Greek operatic baritone who has had an active international career since 2007, excelling particularly in the roles of Verdi and the Italian verismo.

== Early life and education ==
Born in Kalamata, he first studied classical guitar and singing at the Kalamata Municipal Conservatory and went on to attend The Greek National University in Athens, graduating in English Language and English Literature. He was persuaded to relinquish the classical guitar for a career in singing, and in 2000 was awarded the Alexandra Triandi Scholarship by the Friends of Music Foundation in Athens. This enabled him to go to Italy to study with Aldo Protti's widow, Masako Tanaka Protti in Cremona. On returning to Greece, he continued his studies with Aris Christofellis.

== Career ==
In Greece he has collaborated with all the major Greek orchestras and in 2004 made his debut at Greek National Opera, singing the role of Alfio in Mascagni's Cavalleria rusticana. He continues to appear regularly with the company at the Olympia Theatre, the Odeon of Herodes Atticus and the Athens Megaron.

His Italian debut was as Gérard in Giordano's Andrea Chénier in 2007 at Teatro Sociale di Rovigo.

Debuts in the title role of Verdi's Rigoletto followed at Teatro La Fenice in Venice in 2010, at the Royal Opera House, Covent Garden in 2012, at Teatro Massimo di Palermo in 2013, at Théâtre Royal de la Monnaie in 2014.

In concert he sang Rigoletto at the Casa da Mùsica Porto in 2008, with the London Symphony Orchestra at the Barbican in 2013 and at the Concertgebouw, Amsterdam, in 2015.

Other debuts were at the Bregenz Festival as Amonasro (Verdi's Aida) in 2010, at Teatro Nacional de São Carlos Lisbon as Posa (Verdi's Don Carlo) in 2011.

In the title role of Verdi's Simon Boccanegra he made his debut at both the Royal Opera House Muscat, Oman, in 2012 and at the Bavarian State Opera in 2014.

In 2013 he made his debut at both the Deutsche Oper Berlin and Oper Frankfurt as Scarpia (Puccini's Tosca).

His debut in 2015 at both Staatstheater Stuttgart and the Palau de les Arts Reina Sofía Valencia was as Nabucco and in 2016 at the Royal Opera House, Covent Garden.

In 2015 he also made his debut at the Salzburg Easter Festival as Tonio (Leoncavallo's Pagliacci) and in a double bill performed both the roles of Alfio (Mascagni's Cavalleria rusticana) and Tonio at the Royal Opera House, Covent Garden.

Other roles include Guido di Monforte (Verdi's I vespri siciliani), Iago (Verdi's Otello), Germont (Verdi's La traviata), Stankar (Verdi's Stiffelio), Grand Prêtre (Saint-Saёns's Samson et Dalila), Valentin (Gounod's Faust) and Barnaba (Ponchielli's La Gioconda).

== DVDs ==
- Pagliacci – Salzburg Easter Festival conducted by Christian Thielemann – Sony, 2016.
- Cavalleria rusticana/Pagliacci – Royal Opera Covent Garden – conducted by Antonio Pappano – Opus Arte, 2016

== Personal life ==
He is married to the Lieder singer and singing teacher, Christina Giannakopoulou.
