= Borgioli =

Borgioli is an Italian surname. Notable people with the surname include:

- Armando Borgioli (1898–1945), Italian operatic baritone
- Dino Borgioli (1891–1960), Italian lyric tenor
- Billy Borgioli (died 2015), guitarist for the band The Real Kids
