= Bonaldo Giaiotti =

Italian operatic bass

Bonaldo Giaiotti (25 December 1932 – 12 June 2018) was an Italian operatic bass, particularly associated with the Italian repertory.

== Life and career ==
Born in Udine, he studied in his native city and later in Milan with Alfredo Starno, where he made his debut at the Teatro Nuovo in 1957. After singing with success in various opera houses in Italy, he made his American debut in Cincinnati, as Basilio in Il barbiere di Siviglia, in 1959.

The following year, on 12 October 1960, he made his debut at the Metropolitan Opera in New York, and remained with the company for 25 years, singing some 30 roles in over 300 performances, most often as Raimondo in Lucia di Lammermoor, Ramfis in Aida, Timur in Turandot. Other roles included Padre Guardiano in La forza del destino, Phillip II in Don Carlo, Ferrando in Il trovatore, Count Walter in Luisa Miller, Zaccaria in Nabucco, Giorgio in I puritani, Commendatore in Don Giovanni, Alvise in La Gioconda, King Heinrich in Lohengrin, He was also heard in Donizetti's La Favorita at the Met in 2015 at the age of 81.

Giaiotti also made several guest appearances in other major opera houses, the Lyric Opera of Chicago, the Palais Garnier in Paris, the Vienna State Opera, the Teatro Real in Madrid, the Zurich Opera, the Royal Opera House in London, Teatro Colón in Buenos Aires, etc. From 1963 until 1995, he was a regular guest at the Arena di Verona Festival, notably as Verdi's Attila in 1985. Surprisingly, he did not make his first appearance at La Scala until 1986, as Count Rodolfo in La sonnambula.

While best known for performing the Italian repertoire, Giaiotti did sing a number of non-Italian roles, notably the High Priest in Karl Goldmark's Die Königin von Saba (in 1991 at the Teatro Regio (Turin)), Cléomer in Massenet's Esclarmonde (January 1993, at the Teatro Massimo), Cardinal Brogni in Halevy's La Juive, and the Anabaptist in Meyerbeer's Le Prophète, and, as above, King Heinrich in Richard Wagner's Lohengrin (in 1976 and 1980, at the Metropolitan Opera).

He died on 12 June 2018 at the age of 85.

== Selected recordings ==
- 1965 - Puccini - Turandot - Birgit Nilsson, Franco Corelli, Renata Scotto, Bonaldo Giaiotti - Rome Opera Chorus and Orchestra, Francesco Molinari-Pradelli - EMI
- 1967 - Verdi - Aida - Birgit Nilsson, Franco Corelli, Grace Bumbry, Mario Sereni, Bonaldo Giaiotti - Rome Opera Chorus and Orchestra, Zubin Mehta - EMI
- 1969 - Verdi - Il trovatore - Leontyne Price, Plácido Domingo, Fiorenza Cossotto, Sherrill Milnes, Bonaldo Giaiotti - Ambrosian Opera Chorus, Philharmonia Orchestra, Zubin Mehta - RCA Red Seal
- 1974 - Halévy - La Juive (Highlights) - Martina Arroyo, Richard Tucker, Anna Moffo, Bonaldo Giaiotti, Ambrosian Opera Chorus, New Philharmonia Orchestra, Antonio de Almeida - RCA Red Seal
- 1975 - Verdi - Luisa Miller - Montserrat Caballé, Luciano Pavarotti, Sherrill Milnes, Anna Reynolds, Bonaldo Giaiotti, Richard Van Allan - London Opera Chorus, National Philharmonic Orchestra, Peter Maag - Decca
- 1976 - Verdi - La forza del destino - Leontyne Price, Plácido Domingo, Sherrill Milnes, Fiorenza Cossotto, Bonaldo Giaiotti, Gabriel Bacquier - John Alldis Choir, London Symphony Orchestra, James Levine - RCA Red Seal
- 1979 - Ponchielli - La Gioconda - Montserrat Caballé, Maria Luisa Nave, Patricia Payne, José Carreras, Matteo Manuguerra, Jesus Lopez-Cobos - Opera d'Oro
- 1988 - Mascagni - Iris - Ilona Tokody, Plácido Domingo, Juan Pons, Bonaldo Giaiotti - Munich Radio Orchestra, Giuseppe Patané - CBS (Columbia) Masterworks

== References and sources ==
- Operissimo Concertissimo database
- Professional Web-page of Bonaldo Giaiotti
