= Kristján Jóhannsson =

Icelandic operatic tenor (born 1948)

Kristján Jóhannsson (born 24 May 1948 in Akureyri, Iceland) is an Icelandic operatic tenor particularly known for his performances in Verdian roles, and especially as Radames in Aida.

== Biography ==
Although Kristján was born into a musical family, he did not begin his musical studies until he was twenty years old, first at the College of Music in his native city under Sigurdur Demetz. He then went to Italy to pursue additional vocal training at the Conservatorio Nicolini in Piacenza under Gianni Poggi, as well as studying privately with Ettore Campogalliani and Ferruccio Tagliavini.

In 1980, Kristján Jóhannsson made his operatic debut in Osimo, Italy at the Teatro Piccolo la Fenice in Puccini´s Il tabarro and Gianni Schicchi. He then went on to sing in leading opera houses around the world as well as at the Arena di Verona. Apart from Verdian roles, his repertoire also includes the principal tenor roles in operas by Puccini, Leoncavallo, Wagner, Saint-Saëns, Mascagni, and Beethoven.

== Major House debuts ==
- 1985 Cincinnati Opera, Zazà
- 1988 La Scala, I due Foscari
- 1989 Lyric Opera of Chicago, Tosca
- 1991 Vienna State Opera, Tosca
- 1993 New York Metropolitan Opera, Il trovatore
- 1994 Royal Opera House, Covent Garden, Aida.

== Recordings ==
- Verdi: Aida (Maria Dragoni, Kristján Jóhannsson, Francesco Ellero d'Artegna, Barbara Dever, Mark Rucker, RTÉ National Symphony Orchestra; Rico Saccani, conductor). Naxos 8660033-34
- Verdi: Aida (Kristján Jóhannsson, Maria Chiara, Dolora Zajick, Juan Pons, Carlo Strioli, Nicolaj Ghiuselev, Angelo Casertano, Anna Schiatti, Orchestra e Coro dell'Arena di Verona; Nello Santi, conductor) Fondazione Arena di Verona

== Notes and sources ==
- Turandot in the Forbidden City, Beijing, September 1998 Official web site
- Verdi's Aida to debut in Beijing', People's Daily, September 23, 2003
- Review: Il trovatore, Deutsche Oper Berlin, International Herald Tribune, April 3, 1996
