= Aureliano Pertile =

Italian tenor

Aureliano Pertile (photo with 1943 dedication)

Aureliano Pertile (9 November 1885 – 11 January 1952) was an Italian lyric tenor. Many critics consider him one of the most exciting operatic artists of the inter-war period, and one of the most important tenors of the 20th century.

== Life and career ==
Pertile was born in Montagnana, in the province of Padua of Northern Italy, 18 days after the birth of another celebrated tenor, Giovanni Martinelli, in the same town. He studied with Vittorio Orefice in Padua, and Gaetano Bavagnoli in Milan, before making his operatic debut as Lyonel in Martha, in 1911, in Vicenza.

After singing in regional Italy and South America, Pertile first sang at the premier Italian opera house, La Scala, Milan, in 1916. He appeared on this occasion as Paolo in Francesca da Rimini, opposite Rosa Raïsa. Pertile made his New York Metropolitan Opera debut as Cavaradossi in Tosca, with Maria Jeritza in the title role, on 1 December 1921.

In his only season at the Met, his other roles included des Grieux in Manon Lescaut, Turiddu in Cavalleria rusticana, Grigori in Boris Godunov (with Feodor Chaliapin), Radames in Aida, Canio in Pagliacci (opposite Florence Easton), and Julien in Louise (opposite Geraldine Farrar). He also participated in performances of Louise with the Met's touring company at Philadelphia and in Brooklyn.

Thereafter he returned to Italy, where he established himself as the leading tenor at La Scala from 1927 to 1937, becoming a favourite singer of the principal conductor Arturo Toscanini.

Pertile in Otello, 1943 postcard with dedication

As well as previously mentioned works, his La Scala repertory included the title role in Lohengrin, Stolzing in Die Meistersinger von Nürnberg (in Italian), Edgardo in Lucia di Lammermoor, with Toti dal Monte, Alfredo in La traviata, Osaka in Iris, Rodolfo in La bohème, the title part in Andrea Chénier, Manrico in Il trovatore, Riccardo in Un ballo in maschera, Pinkerton in Madama Butterfly, Il Duca in Rigoletto, Alvaro in La forza del destino, Pollione in Norma, Loris in Fedora, Werther, Maurizio in Adriana Lecouvreur, Fernand in La Favorite, and the title part in Fra Diavolo. He also created the leading tenor parts in Boito's Nerone, in 1924, Wolf-Ferrari's Sly, in 1927, and Mascagni's Nerone, in 1935.

In all his La Scala roles, Pertile achieved compelling dramatic results despite possessing a voice that was not especially suave or beautiful. It was sometimes even described by critics as "brutta" (ugly). He was particularly effective in Verdi roles and verismo opera, bringing a rare emotional intensity to his performances.

Pertile also sang at the Royal Opera House in London from 1927 to 1931, and at the Teatro Colón in Buenos Aires between 1918 and 1929. His soprano colleagues included such famous divas as Gilda Dalla Rizza, dal Monte, Claudia Muzio, Raisa, Bidu Sayão, Hina Spani, and Ninon Vallin.

He appeared, too, in unusual operatic works, creating for example the role of Fernando in Felipe Boero's opera Tucuman (in 1918) and the title role in Constantino Gaito's Ollantay (in 1926).

His final stage appearances were in Italy in 1946, in Pagliacci. He then taught at the Milan Conservatory until his death in 1952.

== Recordings ==
Pertile made recordings from 1922 to 1942 (the final three items consisting of excerpts from Otello with Gina Cigna as Desdemona). Numerous CDs containing selections of Pertile's solo recordings and examples of his work in complete operas have been issued by various record companies since the 1980s.

In 1995, a comprehensive anthology of his recordings were issued in an album (with the accompanying monograph, La voce e l'arte di Aureliano Pertile) from TIMAClub. His three complete operatic recordings, namely Aïda (with Dusolina Giannini in the title role, 1928), Il trovatore (1930) and Carmen (in Italian translation, 1932), were not included in the 1995 release but they are available on other CD labels.

== Sources ==
- Hamilton, David; Andris-Michalaros, Aliki (1987). The Metropolitan Opera encyclopedia: a comprehensive guide to the world of opera. New York: Simon & Schuster. ISBN 978-0-500-01425-7.
- Rosenthal, Harold; Warrack, John (1980). The Concise Oxford Dictionary of Opera (2nd ed.). London: Oxford University Press. OCLC 60900670.
- Steane, J.B. (1974). The grand tradition: 70 years of singing on record. London: Duckworth. OCLC 252923732.

== Bibliography ==
- Aureliano Pertile e il suo metodo di canto, by D. Silvestrini, 1932.
- Pertile, una voce, un mito, by Bruno Tosi, 1985.
