= Corrado Zambelli =

Italian opera singer

Corrado Zambelli (3 June 1897 in Bondeno (Fe) – 1 September 1974 in Bologna) was an Italian classical bass who had an active international singing career in operas and concerts from the 1920s through the 1950s. He appears on several complete opera recordings, including Otello and Carmen for His Master's Voice; and Ernani, Il trovatore, La favorite, and La Gioconda for Columbia Records.

== Life and career ==
Born in Bondeno (Fe), he studied singing with Alessandro Vezzani at the Liceo musicale di Bologna (now the Conservatorio Giovanni Battista Martini). He made his professional opera debut in 1924 at the opera house in Vigevano as Sparafucile in Rigoletto. He made his debuts at La Scala and La Fenice the following year. Engagements with other important houses soon followed, including the Teatro Carlo Felice, the Teatro Comunale di Bologna, the Teatro di San Carlo, the Teatro Regio di Parma, and the Teatro Regio Torino. He appeared at the Arena di Verona Festival (1930–32) and at the Maggio Musicale Fiorentino (1937). He remained active in Italy's major opera houses up until his retirement sometime during the 1950s.

On the international stage, Zambelli toured Australia with an Italian opera troupe in 1930. In 1933 he undertook a concert tour through Holland and then sang there 1934–35 as a member of the Italian opera. In 1937–1938 he appeared as a guest artist at both the Theatro Municipal in Rio de Janeiro and the Theatro Municipal in São Paulo. He was committed to the Royal Opera House in London in 1938–1939, performing such roles as Colline in La Bohème, Ramfis in Aida, Sparafucile, and Timur in Turandot.

Zambelli was active as a teacher of singing in Bologna both during his career and after his retirement from the stage. One of his students was Anselmo Colzani. He died in Bologna in 1974 at the age of 77.

== Sources ==
- Zambelli, Corrado at operissimo.com (in German)
- Casaglia, Gherardo (2005). "Corrado Zambelli". L'Almanacco di Gherardo Casaglia (in Italian).
