= Margherita Carosio =

Italian operatic soprano (1908–2005)

- Margherita Carosio as Amina in La sonnambula, Teatro alla Scala, Milan, 1943
- Born: 7 June 1908; Genoa
- Died: 10 January 2005 (aged 96); Genoa
- Occupation: operatic soprano

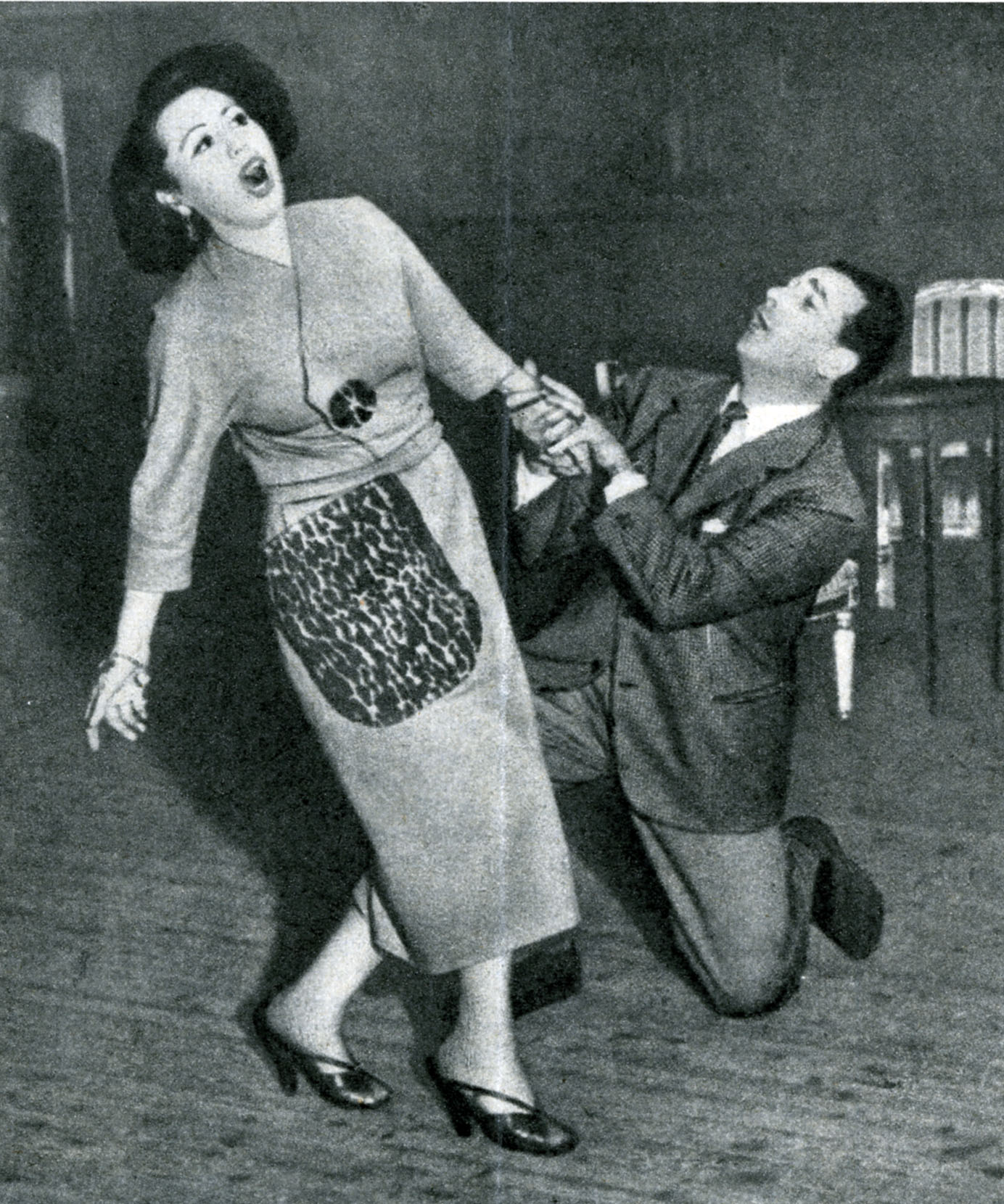
Margherita Carosio and Giacinto Prandelli (1956)

Margherita Carosio (7 June 1908 – 10 January 2005) was a leading Italian operatic coloratura soprano and actress, starring in Spanish films during the 1930s.

Her voice is preserved in many Parlophone and Ultraphon recordings made before World War II, as well as a His Master's Voice series made in London from the 1940s. She was still singing leading roles in her early sixties and was considered one of the leading bel canto sopranos of her day. She was born and died in Genoa.

Carosio is most often remembered today as the singer whose indisposition in January 1949 led to Maria Callas learning and singing the role of Elvira in Bellini's I puritani in five days while she was performing Brünnhilde in Wagner's Die Walküre at Teatro La Fenice in Venice.

== Early life and career ==
Carosio was the daughter of composer Natale Carosio, who taught her how to sing as a child. Carosio has been described as being a skilled singer and having a light, coloratura voice.

Carosio first performed in public at the age of 14. In 1924, at age 16, she made her operatic debut in Novi Ligure at the Teatro Cavour, performing Lucia di Lammermoor. In 1928, she was recommended by soprano Margherita Sheridan to the Royal Opera House, Covent Garden, to sing the role of Feodor in Mussorgsky's Boris Godunov with Feodor Chaliapin. The chorus sang in French, Carosio sang in Italian, and Chaliapin sang in Russian. In the same season, she also sang Musetta in La bohème.

She performed throughout Italy: in Bellini's La sonnambula, as Norina in Donizetti's Don Pasquale, and as Konstanze in Mozart's Il Seraglio. She played Oscar in Verdi's Un ballo in maschera at La Scala, where she performed often and to great acclaim. Some other roles include: Rosina in The Barber of Seville, Zerlina in Auber's Fra Diavolo, the Queen of Shemakhan in Rimsky-Korsakov's The Golden Cockerel, and Volkhova in his Sadko and the title role of Stravinsky's The Nightingale. She sang Aminta in the first Italian performances of Richard Strauss's Die schweigsame Frau as well as and Egloge in the 1935 world-premiere of Mascagni's Nerone, both at La Scala, where she continued to appear until 1955.

Carosio returned to London in 1946 with the visiting San Carlo company of Naples and played Violetta in La traviata, a role that British soldiers had seen her perform during the war. She later appeared with a scratch Italian company as Adina in Donizetti's L'elisir d'amore, which she had also sung at La Scala and recorded for EMI. Carioso also performed at La Scala in Menotti's Amelia Goes to the Ball, which she also recorded. Carioso had a brief career in Italian films, and even received turned down an offer from MGM in Hollywood.

== Retirement and death ==
Carosio retired from the operatic stage in 1959 and for the next 40 years pursued a second career as a journalist and music critic in her hometown.

She died in 2005 at the age of 96.

== Bibliography ==
- The Last Prima Donnas, by Lanfranco Rasponi, Alfred A Knopf, 1982; ISBN 0-394-52153-6
- " Margherita Carosio. La diva che amava i gioielli", by Andrea Lanzola, in "Étude" n° 31, July–August–September 2005 (Association internationale de chant Lyrique TITTA RUFFO. Site: titta-ruffo-international.jimdo.com).
