= Giacomo Rimini =

American opera singer

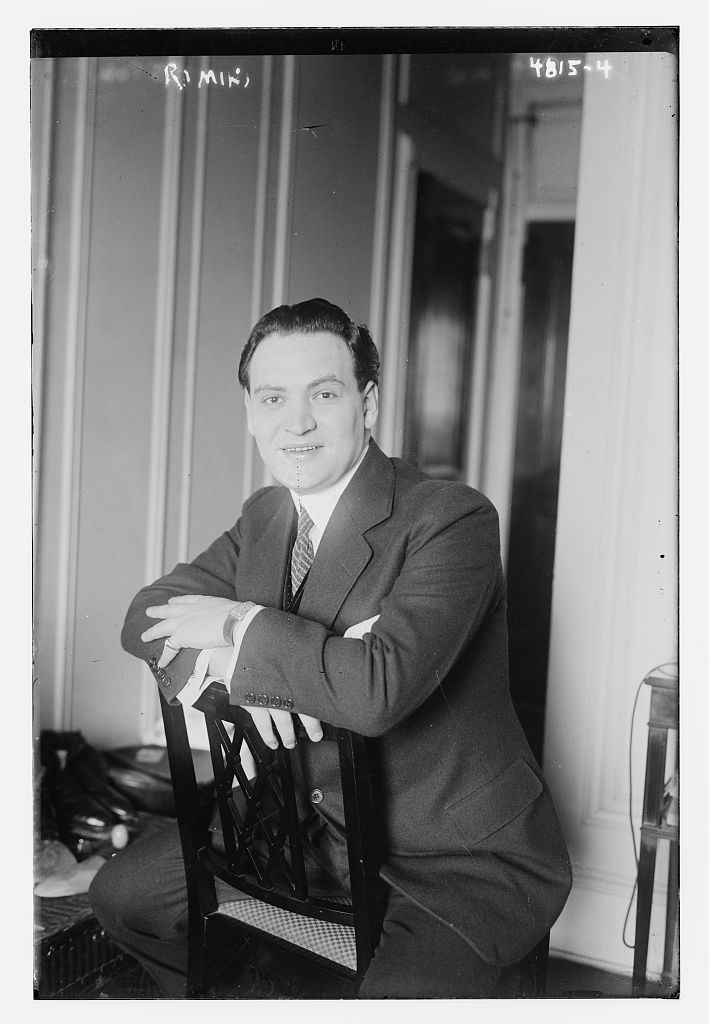
Giacomo Rimini in 1918

Giacomo Rimini (March 22, 1887 – March 6, 1952) was an Italian-American operatic baritone. He was most admired for his interpretations of the works of Giuseppe Verdi.

== Biography ==
Giacomo Rimini was born and raised in Verona, Italy. His father, Riccardo Rimini, descended from Sephardic Jews long resident in Verona; his mother, Giulia Sottopera, was Catholic. Rimini studied at the Verona Music Conservatory with Amelia Conti Foroni. He began his operatic career in Italy in his early twenties. His first lead role was as Escamillo in Bizet's Carmen at the age of 22. In 1910 he sang the role of Albert in Massenet's Werther at the municipal theater of Desenzano. He sang with many notable Italian opera houses over the next several years including the Teatro Regio (Turin), the Teatro Massimo in Palermo, and at the Teatro Costanzi in Rome. In 1915, Rimini was chosen by Arturo Toscanini to sing the title role in Verdi's Falstaff at the Teatro del Verme in Milan. He reprised the role later that year with Toscanini at La Scala in the presence of King Victor Emmanuel III.

Also in 1915, Rimini met in Bologna Polish Jewish opera singer Rosa Raisa and the two of them fell in love with each other. They moved to Chicago, Illinois in 1916 where they would both establish a long association with the Chicago City Opera Company, the Chicago Civic Opera, and the Ravinia Festival. Rimini had been married once previously to a woman from Rome, Raffaella Bettei. Rimini and Raisa married in 1920 after moving to Chicago and became naturalized citizens of the United States in 1923. Rimini and Raisa had one daughter, Rosa Giulietta (Jolly) Segala, who was born in July 1931.

In addition to Falstaff and Escamillo, Rimini was admired for his portrayals of the title role in Verdi's Rigoletto, Iago in Verdi's Otello, Amonasro in Verdi's Aida, Renato in Verdi's Un ballo in maschera, Figaro in Rossini's Il barbiere di Siviglia, Tonio in Pagliacci, Barnaba in Amilcare Ponchielli's La Gioconda among others. In addition to frequently singing opposite his wife on the operatic and concert stage, Rimini also performed frequently with Amelita Galli-Curci. The two of them sang their first Figaro and Rosina in Il barbiere di Siviglia together with the Chicago Opera Company among many other performances.

Although Rimini primarily worked in Chicago, he and his wife did occasionally travel to other parts of the United States and in South America for performances, usually performing together. They also maintained a villa in Verona where they would spend their summers and occasionally appear in operas. Most notably, Rimini originated the role of Ping in Puccini's Turandot at La Scala in 1926 opposite his wife in the title role. He also was the first person to completely record the role of Falstaff, which he also did with La Scala forces in 1932.

In 1933 the Riminis appeared in a European tour with Teatro alla Scala's singers, which included a one-week series of performances at the Städtische Oper in Berlin, Germany. It was controversial due to the Jewish Raisa’s participation, and Rimini’s half-Jewish ‘racial’ status.

In the following years, while Raisa preferred to concentrate on her Chicago engagements, Rimini appeared frequently in Italy having the opportunity to sing with many of the Italian operatic luminaries of the time.

Rimini and his wife both announced their retirement from the operatic stage in 1937. Due to the Fascist Racial Laws and the Second World War they stayed away from Italy from 1939 to 1946. In Chicago, they decided to concentrate their time to teaching the next generation of opera singers. They had opened a voice/opera school in Chicago which they ran for two decades. As a part of the school, students would travel to Italy with Rimini and his wife to study in Verona, often staying at their teacher's villa.

Giacomo Rimini died in his sleep on March 6, 1952, at his home in Chicago.

== Discography ==
=== Opera recordings ===
- Falstaff in Verdi's Falstaff with Lorenzo Molajoli and La Scala, originally recorded in 1932, Naxos label, current edition released on September 17, 2002, ASIN B00006B1K9.

=== Other recordings ===
- Opera in Chicago, Vol.2, Symposium label, released on January 14, 1997, ASIN B000001XWZ. Rimini sings on only two tracks: an aria from Ambroise Thomas' Hamlet and an aria from Verdi's Un Ballo In Maschera.
- Rosa Raisa Complete Recordings, Marston label, released August 11, 1998, ASIN B00000AE0L. Rimini appears on over a dozen tracks singing works by Verdi, Mascagni, and Mozart.

=== Video recordings ===
- Selection from Act IV of Il Trovatore (1927), with Giacomo Rimini and Rosa Raisa. Vitaphone production reel #524.

== Sources ==
- Operissimo.com
- A Biography by Charles Mintzer
