= Ettore Panizza =

Argentine conductor and composer

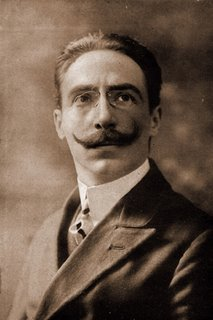
Argentine composer and conductor Ettore Panizza.

Ettore Panizza (born Héctor Panizza; 12 August 1875 – 27 November 1967) was an Argentine conductor and composer, one of the leading conductors of the early 20th century. Panizza possessed technical mastery and was popular and influential during his time, widely admired by Richard Strauss and Giacomo Puccini, among others.

== Biography ==
Ettore Panizza (photo with 1946 dedication)

Panizza was born in Buenos Aires, of Italian parents. His birth name was Héctor Panizza but throughout his career he was known as Ettore. Panizza studied first with his father, who was a cellist at the old Teatro Colón, and later in Milan. He made his debut as assistant conductor at the Rome Opera in 1897.

He was closely associated with La Scala in Milan (where he conducted, along with Toscanini, titles like Wagner's Ring in 1926), the Royal Opera House in London, the Metropolitan Opera in New York City- where he succeeded Tullio Serafin as principal conductor of Italian repertoire, working for eight seasons with names like Rosa Ponselle and Enrico Caruso - and mainly at the Teatro Colón in Buenos Aires where his opera Aurora was premiered during the inaugural season.

He conducted Puccini's Turandot with the ending by Franco Alfano after the world premiere at La Scala on 25 April 1926 conducted by Arturo Toscanini, who stopped at the point where Puccini had ceased writing before his death.

He worked at the Teatro Colón in 1908, 1909, 1921, 1927 (Claudia Muzio as Tosca and in La bohème), 1929 (Turandot with Rosa Raisa), 1930, 1934 (Carmen with Gabriela Besanzoni), 1935, 1936, 1939 (Boris Godunov, La traviata, Macbeth, Turandot, Aida with Bizancio with Gina Cigna), 1942 (Aida and Simon Boccanegra with Zinka Milanov and Leonard Warren), 1943 (Falstaff), 1944 (Bizancio), 1945 (Aurora), 1946, 1947 (Tosca and Andrea Chénier with Maria Caniglia and Beniamino Gigli), 1948, 1949, 1951, 1952 (Madama Butterfly with Victoria de los Ángeles), 1954 and 1955. He also worked with singers such as Alessandro Bonci, Nellie Melba and Ezio Pinza.

He also made guest appearances in Chicago and European capitals such as Paris, Madrid, Vienna, and Berlin.

He heard British soprano Eva Turner in 1924 as Madama Butterfly and recommended her to Toscanini, launching her impressive international career (as also did the young conductor Antonino Votto).

Among the many premieres he conducted were Francesca da Rimini and Conchita by Riccardo Zandonai, Sly by Ermanno Wolf-Ferrari, and The Island God by Gian Carlo Menotti. He also conducted many local premieres in London, New York, and Milan such as Mussorgsky's Khovanshchina and Respighi's La campana sommersa.

Panizza composed four operas; Il fidanzato del mare (1897), Medio Evo Latino (1900), Aurora (1908), his most successful work (the tenor aria "Alta en el cielo" in the second Spanish version became the patriotic song school children sing to the flag) and Bizancio (1939).

He published his autobiography Medio Siglo de Vida Musical in 1952.

Panizza died in Milan in 1967.

== Recordings ==
- Verdi - Otello - Giovanni Martinelli, Elisabeth Rethberg - 1938, Naxos Historical 8.111018-19
- Verdi - La traviata - Rosa Ponselle, Fredrick Jagel, Lawrence Tibbett - Metropolitan Opera
- Verdi - La traviata - Bidu Sayão, Bruno Landi, Thelma Votipka, Alessio De Paolis, 1942
- Verdi - Simon Boccanegra - Elisabeth Rethberg, Giovanni Martinelli, Lawrence Tibbett, Ezio Pinza, Leonard Warren. Met 1939
- Verdi - Aida - Zinka Milanov, Arthur Carron, Richard Bonelli, Bruna Castagna, Norman Cordon; 1939
- Verdi - Il trovatore - Stella Roman, Bruna Castagna, Arthur Carron (or Charles Kullman), Norman Cordon; 1941
- Verdi - Un ballo in maschera - Stella Roman, Giovanni Martinelli, Bruna Castagna, Josephine Antoine, Norman Cordon, Nicola Moscona; 1942
- Ponchielli - La Gioconda - Zinka Milanov, Giovanni Martinelli, Metropolitan 1939
- Puccini - Madama Butterfly - Licia Albanese, Charles Kullman, Irra Petina; 1941
- Puccini - Tosca - Grace Moore, Frederick Jagel, Alexander Sved, 1942
- Mendelssohn - Symphony No. 4
- Felipe Boero - excerpts from opera El Matrero
- Mozart - The Marriage of Figaro. Ezio Pinza, John Brownlee, Licia Albanese, Jarmila Novotná, Elisabeth Rethberg - Metropolitan 1940

== Sources ==
- R. Mancini and J.-J. Rouvereux, ed. (1986). Le guide de l'opéra. Fayard. ISBN 2-213-01563-5.
- Enzo Valenti Ferro, Los Directores: Teatro Colón 1908-1984 (Buenos Aires: Ediciones de Arte Gaglianone, 1985): 23–6.
- MICHAEL KENNEDY and JOYCE BOURNE. "Panizza, Ettore." The Concise Oxford Dictionary of Music. 1996.
