= Carlos Guichandut =

Argentine baritone

- Carlos Guichandut (photo with dedication)
- Born: Carlos Maria Guichandut; November 4, 1914; Buenos Aires, Argentina
- Died: 27 September 1990 (aged 75); Buenos Aires, Argentina
- Occupation: Operatic tenor

Carlos Maria Guichandut (November 4, 1914 – September 27, 1990) was an Argentine operatic baritone, and later tenor, particularly associated with heroic roles.

Born in Buenos Aires, he studied first philosophy and then singing, with Alfredo Bontà Biancardi. He began his career as a baritone in 1938 singing zarzuela. He made his operatic debut at the Teatro Colon in 1945, in the title role of Rigoletto, followed by Conte di Luna in Il trovatore, Iago in Otello, and Scarpia in Tosca.

He then went to Italy, appearing at the Teatro San Carlo in Naples, and La Fenice in Venice, and made his debut at La Scala in Milan in 1948, as Renato in Un ballo in maschera.

In 1952, after further vocal studies with Fidelia Campigna, he made a second debut in Bari, as a tenor this time, in the role of Siegmund in Die Walküre. The following year, he sang the role of Giasone in Medea, opposite Maria Callas, at the Maggio Musicale Fiorentino, to great acclaim. That same year, he sang Bacchus in Ariadne auf Naxos, at the Glyndebourne Festival.

In 1954, he sang his first Otello, a role that would quickly become one of his signature roles. In 1955, he sang Otello and Don José in Carmen, at the Verona Arena.

He made his debut at the Royal Opera House in London in 1958, as Radames in Aida. He also sang at the Paris Opera, the Liceo in Barcelona, also appearing in Palermo and Mexico City.

He retired from the stage in 1974. He died in Buenos Aires in 1990.

== Recording ==
- Otello - Carlos Guichandut (Otello), Cesy Broggini (Desdemona), Giuseppe Taddei (Iago) - Orchestra and Chorus of Rai Turin, Franco Capuana - Warner Fonit (1955)

== Sources ==
- Operissimo.com
