= Nerone (Mascagni) =

Opera by Pietro Mascagni

Nerone (Nero) is an opera in three acts by Pietro Mascagni from a libretto by Giovanni Targioni-Tozzetti, based on the 1872 play Nerone by Pietro Cossa. Most of Mascagni's music was drawn from a failed project Vistilia (from 1907) – the music made to 'fit' a wholly unconnected libretto.

It received its first performance on 16 January 1935 at La Scala, Milan, which was conducted by Mascagni himself.

== Roles ==
Roles, voice types, premiere cast
Role	Voice type	Premiere cast, 16 January 1935 Conductor: Pietro Mascagni
Atte	soprano	Lina Bruna Rasa
Claudio Cesare Nerone	tenor	Aureliano Pertile
Clivio Rufo	bass	Duilio Baronti
Egloge	soprano	Margherita Carosio
Epafrodìto	baritone	Fabio Ronchi
Faònte	tenor	Gino Del Signore
Icèlo	tenor	Giuseppe Nessi
Menècrate	baritone	Apollo Granforte
Vinìcio	baritone	Aristide Baracchi
Nevio	tenor	Ettore Parmeggiani
Pastore	tenor	Nello Palai
Basilio	bass	Tancredi Pasero
Petronio	bass	Giuseppe Noto
Mucrone	bass	Luciano Donaggio
Eulogio	bass	Franco Zaccarini
