= Aurora (opera) =

1907 opera in three acts by Héctor Panizza

Aurora is an opera in three acts by the Argentine composer Héctor Panizza (also known as Ettore Panizza) set to an Italian libretto by Luigi Illica and Hector Quesada. Composed in 1907, Aurora became the second national opera of Argentina, after Felipe Boero's more popular El Matrero. Although its plot is set in Argentina, Aurora is Italian in style. Panizza's score shows a strong influence of Giordano and Mascagni.

Aurora was the first Argentine opera to be commissioned for the inaugural season of the Teatro Colón in Buenos Aires, where it premiered on 5 September 1908. The main tenor aria, "Alta en el cielo" ("High in the sky"), from the intermedio épico at the finale of Act 2 is now used as a national hymn to the Argentine flag. What not many people know is that the Spanish lyrics are a poor translation of the original Italian text, so many lines are obscure and hard to make sense of.

The later revised version of the opera set in Spanish was premiered on 9 July 1945 and is now considered the Argentine patriotic opera par excellence.

Aurora was also performed at Teatro Colón in 1909 (with Hariclea Darclée), 1945, 1953, 1955, 1965, 1966, 1983, 1999, and 2024.

== Synopsis ==
During the events of May 1810 in the province of Córdoba.

=== Act 1 ===
In the church and convent of the Society of Jesus.

The novices Marioan and Raymundo meet and discover a piece of paper that reads "Young people, greet Aurora!" She shines triumphantly. In the sky of the Fatherland, the fight for Independence begins!" So, today is when the splendid Fatherland is born!"

In the church and convent of the Company of Jesus, in Córdoba, there are the novices Mariano and Raymundo, who find a piece of paper that reads: Young people: Greetings to the dawn that arises in the sky of the Homeland! The fight for Independence begins today, May 25; Today is when the splendid Homeland is born" and another message that says: " Will our Córdoba see the banner of the revolution waving? Córdoba is not cowardly! Everyone knows it! Young People, tonight, open the convent to the people and hand over the weapons that Liniers hid there! or all is lost!"

To everyone's surprise, Mariano takes the initiative and convinces his companions to join the patriotic cause. The royalist leaders, faced with the unexpected pronouncement, decide to convert the church into a fortress. Mariano finds himself faced with a terrible dilemma: when he falls in love with Aurora, daughter of the royalist leader Don Ignacio, he does not dare to give in to his love so as not to betray the cause he intends to defend. At the end of the act, the arrival of the patriots interrupts his hesitations, at the same time that the convent bells announce a new day.

== Sources ==
- Laurance, Rita, Aurora, opera, All Music Guide
