= RCA Victrola =

RCA Victrola was a budget record label introduced by RCA Victor in the early 1960s to reissue classical recordings originally released on the RCA Victor "Red Seal" label. The name "Victrola" came from the early console phonographs with enclosed horns first marketed by the Victor Talking Machine Company in 1906. Many of RCA Victrola's reissues included recordings from the historic RCA Victor "Living Stereo" series first released in 1958, using triple channel stereophonic tapes from as early as 1954. RCA Victrola also reissued the recordings of many historic operatic vocalists, conductors and instrumentalists from the RCA Victor archives, dating from the label's beginnings as the Victor Talking Machine Company in the early 1900's. The RCA Victrola label continued into the compact disc era, but was eventually superseded by the RCA Gold Seal label.

== See also ==
- RCA Red Seal Records
- RCA Camden
- List of record labels
