= Luigi Marini =

Italian opera singer

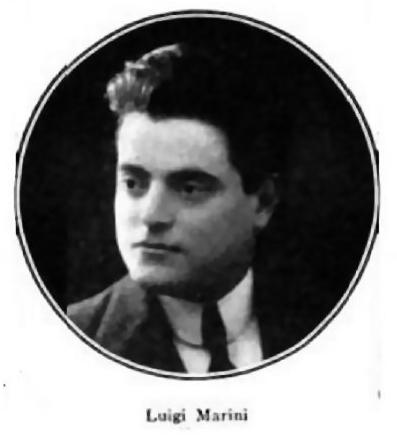
The Theatre, 1913

Luigi Marini (1885–1942) was an Italian lyric tenor.

Marini was born in Ascoli Piceno, Italy, in 1885. He made his operatic debut in Ravenna as Alfredo in Verdi's La traviata. After his great success, he appeared at Teatro Donizetti in Bergamo as Enzo Grimaldo in Ponchielli's La Gioconda. In 1910, he made his appearance in Bucharest (Ernesto in Don Pasquale, Rodolfo in La bohème). Then, in 1912, he appeared at the Municipal Teatro of Rio de Janeiro, where he sang the roles of B. F. Pinkerton in Puccini's Madama Butterfly, Hagenbach in Catalani's La Wally and Mario Cavaradossi in Puccini's Tosca. In the same year, he visited Teatro dell'Opera di Roma, where he had enormous successes in the roles of Hagenbach and Rodolfo.

In 1915, he debuted at the Teatro alla Scala di Milano, in the role of Enzo Grimaldo, where he had a great success. In 1921, he returned to La Scala and sang the title roles in Puccini's Il tabarro and Gianni Schicchi, and Catalani's La Wally. In 1924, he was invited to Covent Garden in London, where he first sang the role of Andrea Chénier of the opera of the same name by Umberto Giordano. After that, Andrea Chénier became Marini's signature role. In 1929, he sang this role in the first complete recording of Andrea Chénier made together with Orchestra and Chorus of the Teatro alla Scala di Milano under the baton of maestro Lorenzo Molajoli (Naxos Historical 8.110066-67).

Marini was also successful in Teatro La Fenice di Venezia, Teatro Regio di Torino, Teatro San Carlo di Napoli and Teatro Carlo Felice di Genova, where he sang the roles of Luigi (Puccini's Il tabarro), Rinuccio (Puccini's Gianni Schicchi), Rodolfo (La bohème), Faust (Boito's Mefistofele), Enzo Grimaldo (Ponchielli's La Gioconda) and Walter (Catalani's Loreley).

Marini also made his appearances outside Italy: he sang at Oper Zürich, Gran Teatre del Liceu in Barcelona and Teatro Sao Carlos in Lisbon, where he debuted in the roles of Edgardo in Donizetti's Lucia di Lammermoor, Rodolfo in Puccini's La bohème and Turiddu in Mascagni's Cavalleria rusticana. Marini ended his operatic career in 1931 after he had sung the role of Andrea Chénier. He died in Ascoli Piceno in 1942.

== Discography ==
- 1928 - La bohème (Puccini) - Orchestra and Chorus of La Scala, Milan; Lorenzo Molajoli: Luigi Marini (Rodolfo), Rosetta Pampanini (Mimì)
- 1931 - Andrea Chénier (Giordano) - Orchestra and Chorus of La Scala, Milan; Lorenzo Molajoli: Luigi Marini (Andrea Chénier), Lina Bruna Rasa (Maddalena)
