= Nerone (Boito) =

Opera by Arrigo Boito

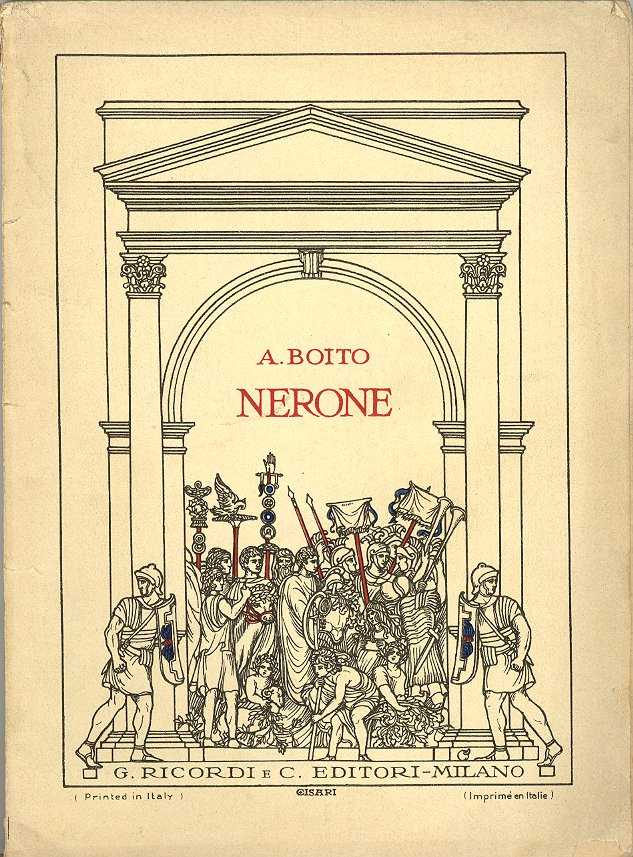
Libretto title page, 1924

Nerone (Nero) is an opera in four acts composed by Arrigo Boito, to a libretto in Italian written by the composer. The work is a series of scenes from Imperial Rome at the time of Emperor Nero depicting tensions between the Imperial religion and Christianity, and ends with the Great Fire of Rome. Boito died in 1918 before finishing the work.

== Performance history ==
It was eventually premiered posthumously at La Scala on 1 May 1924, conducted by Arturo Toscanini in a version of the score completed by Toscanini, Vincenzo Tommasini, and Antonio Smareglia. The role of Nero, originally intended for Francesco Tamagno, was first performed by Aureliano Pertile. The role of Asteria, a young woman torn between her love for Nero and her Christian sympathies, was created by Rosa Raisa.

The opera was very well received at its premiere, and the newly rebuilt Rome Opera House inaugurated its first season with Nerone in 1928. However, it has only been rarely performed since that time, even in Italy. It did not receive its US premiere until 12 April 1982, when it was performed in a concert version by the Opera Orchestra of New York conducted by Eve Queler in Carnegie Hall.

== Roles ==
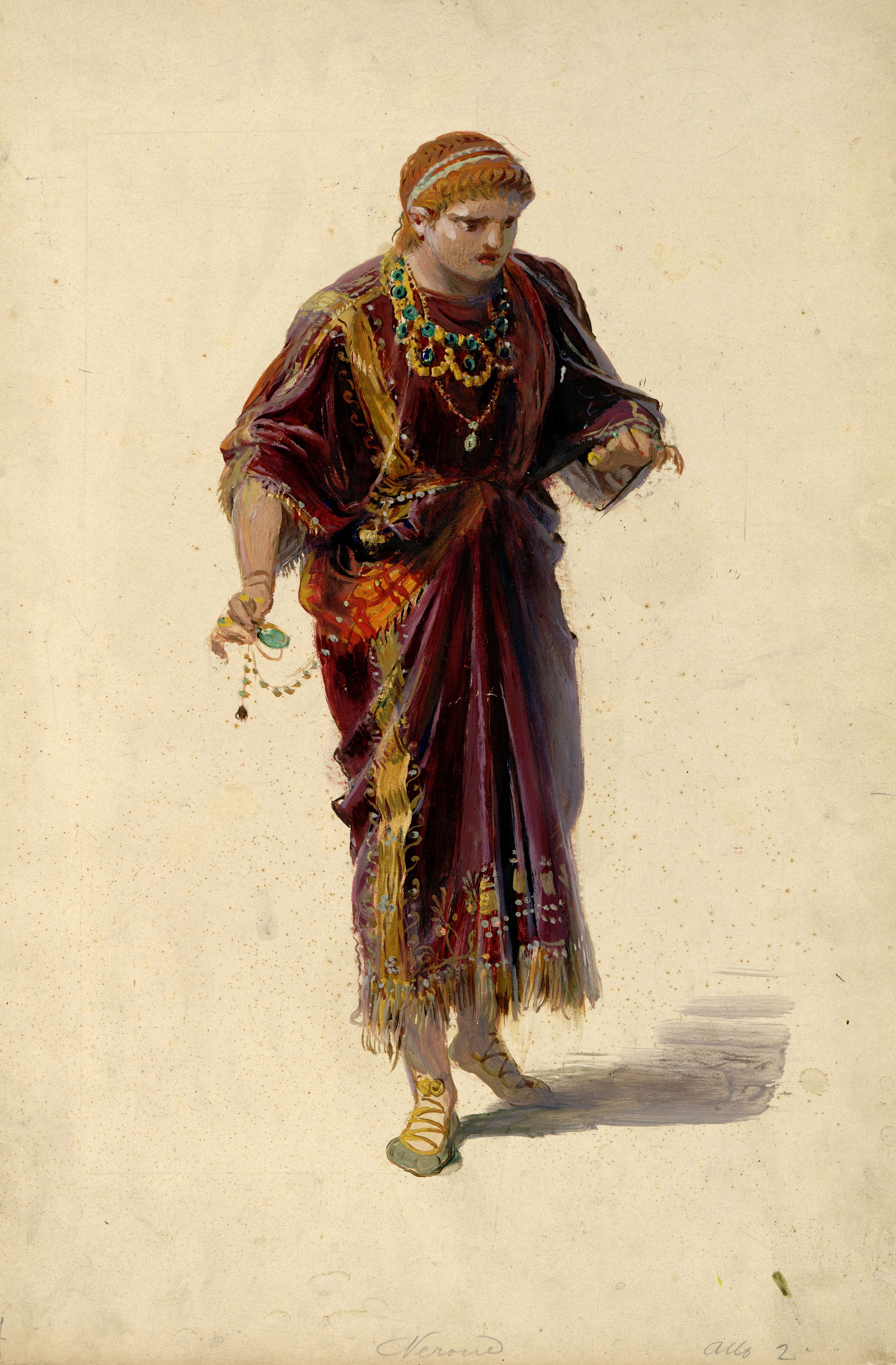
Nerone, costume design for Nerone act 2 (1924)

Roles, voice types, premiere cast
Role	Voice type	Premiere cast, 1 May 1924 Conductor: Arturo Toscanini
Asteria	soprano	Rosa Raisa
Cerinto	contralto	Maria Doria
Dositèo	baritone	Carlo Walter
Fanuèl	baritone	Carlo Galeffi
Gobrias	tenor	Giuseppe Nessi
Nerone	tenor	Aureliano Pertile
Pèrside	soprano	Mita Vasari
Rubria	mezzo-soprano	Luisa Bertana
Simon Mago	baritone	Marcel Journet
Tigellino	bass	Ezio Pinza
