= Cesare Formichi =

Italian operatic baritone (1883–1949)

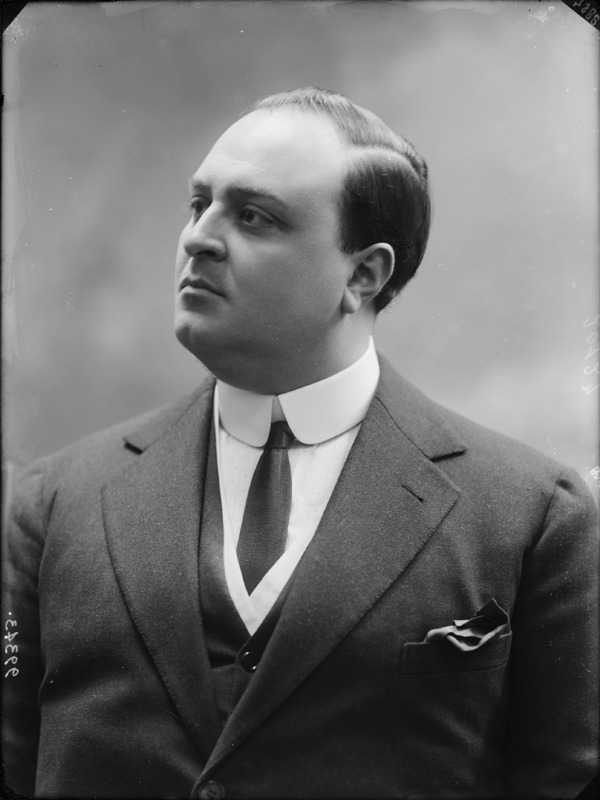
Cesare Formichi

Cesare Formichi (15 April 1883 in Rome – 21 July 1949 in Rome) was a prominent Italian operatic baritone, particularly associated with the Italian repertory.

Formichi studied in Rome with Pio Di Pietro and in Firenze with Vincenzo Lombardi, and made his debut in December 1907 at the Teatro Olimpia in Bologna as Lescaut in Manon. He went on to appear in Italy's leading opera houses, including La Scala in Milan. Soon, he was accepting a string of engagements to sing outside Italy, notably in Saint Petersburg (in 1912), Buenos Aires (in 1914), Paris (in 1922), Monte-Carlo, Vienna, and London (in 1924).

He sang as first baritone at the Chicago Opera from 1922 until 1932. He sang in Berlin in October 1933 with the Italian opera conducted by Ettore Panizza. He went with a troupe of singers from La Scala on a tour of France in 1935, and later organized opera seasons in London.

Notable roles of his included Ashton, Rigoletto, di Luna, Amonasro, Iago, and some Wagner parts sung in Italian (Klingsor, for example). Formichi possessed a big, rich-toned, important sounding voice which can be heard on the numerous acoustic and electrical recordings which he made during the peak of his career. Many of these recordings have been re-released on CD.

== Sources ==
- Le guide de l"opéra, les indispensables de la musique, R. Mancini & J-J. Rouvereux, (Fayard, 1986), ISBN 2-213-01563-5; Press photograph Berlin 7-10-1933.
