= Maria Capuana =

Italian opera singer

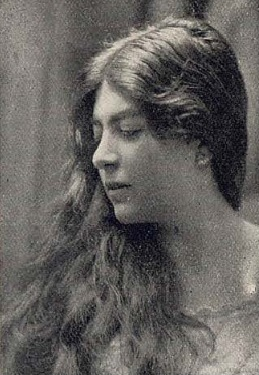
Maria Capuana

Maria Capuana (2 September 1891 – 22 February 1955) was an Italian mezzo-soprano who had a major international opera career during the first half of the 20th century. She possessed a voice with a dark timbre that she used with great expression.

== Life and career ==
Born in Fano in the Province of Pesaro and Urbino on 2 September 1891, Maria Capuana was the older sister of conductor Franco Capuana. She was trained in the art of singing and piano performance at the Conservatory of San Pietro a Majella in Naples where she was a pupil of Beniamino Carelli. She made her stage debut in 1916 at the opera house in Reggio Emilia as Amneris in Giuseppe Verdi's Aida; a role which she would repeat at many major opera houses internationally later in her career and notably record for the opera's first commercial recording in 1928.

Capuana soon began appearing in leading roles at major opera houses in both Italy and France and by 1920 she had already made appearances at La Scala in Milan, the Teatro di San Carlo in Naples, the Teatro Regio in Turin, and the Théâtre des Champs-Élysées in Paris among others. She enjoyed several major successes with the role of Brangäne in Richard Wagner's Tristan und Isolde in her early career, and the part helped establish herself as one of Italy's leading Wagnerian singers. Other Wagner roles in her repertoire, included Ortrud in Lohengrin, Venus in Tannhäuser, and Erda, Fricka, Gutrune, and the Second Norn in The Ring Cycle.

In 1921 Capuana portrayed Zoraide in the world premiere of Carlo Adolfo Cantù's Ettore Fieramosca at the Teatro Regio in Turin. In 1923 she had a major triumph at La Scala as Herodias in Richard Strauss's Salome. She continued to return with some frequency to that house through 1928 in such roles as Amneris, Fricka, Ortrud, and Rubria in Arrigo Boito's Nerone. She was seen at the Teatro Carlo Felice periodically between 1924 and 1936 where she sang a number of Wagner roles. She also made a number of appearances between 1927 and 1930 at the Teatro di San Carlo, including the role of Rufina in Riccardo Zandonai's Conchita. She notably created the title role in the world premiere of Emilio Pizzi's Ivania at the Teatro Donizetti in Bergamo in 1926. During the 1930s she made several appearances at the Teatro Massimo in Palermo. In 1931 she toured Italy as a member of the Carro di Tespi.

Outside of Italy, Capuana performed in operas in Barcelona, Lisbon, Cairo, Argentina, Chile, France, and South Africa during the 1920s and 1930s. She was a much loved Amneris at the Teatro Colón in 1925. In 1935 she toured France as a recitalist.

Capuana's performance career ceased around the outbreak of World War II. Other roles she performed on stage included Adalgisa in Norma, Azucena in Il trovatore, Cerinto in Nerone, Charlotte in Werther, Laura in La Gioconda, Leonora in La favorite, Maffio Orsini in Lucrezia Borgia, Marguerite in La damnation de Faust, Princess Eboli in Don Carlos, and the Old Woman in L'amore dei tre re. She died in Cagliari at the age of 63.
