= Franco Capuana =

Italian conductor (1894–1969)

- Franco Capuana (photo with 1953 dedication)
- Born: Francesco Giacinto Capuana; 29 September 1894; Fano, Italy
- Died: 10 December 1969 (age 75); Naples, Italy
- Occupation: conductor
- Years active: 1930 - 1946
- Relatives: Maria Capuana (sister)

Franco Capuana (29 September 1894 – 10 December 1969) was an Italian conductor.

Born in Fano in the Province of Pesaro and Urbino, he was the younger brother of mezzo-soprano Maria Capuana. He became associated with the Teatro di San Carlo in 1930 and La Scala in 1937. In 1940 he conducted the premiere of Ghedini's opera La pulce d'oro at the Teatro Carlo Felice. He visited the Royal Opera House in 1946, becoming the first guest conductor of the newly formed Royal Opera, London.

He died at the age of 75 on the conductor's podium in the middle of leading a performance of Rossini's Mosè in Egitto at the Teatro di San Carlo in Naples.

== Notable recordings ==
- Vincenzo Bellini - La sonnambula - Lina Pagliughi, Ferruccio Tagliavini, Cesare Siepi, Anna Maria Anelli, Wanda Ruggeri - Coro & Orchestra della RAI Torino (Warner-Fonit, 1952)
- Giuseppe Verdi - Otello - Carlos Guichandut, Cesy Broggini, Giuseppe Taddei - Coro & Orchestra della RAI Torino (Warner-Fonit, 1955)
- Giacomo Puccini - La fanciulla del West - Renata Tebaldi, Mario del Monaco, Cornell MacNeil, Piero de Palma, Giorgio Tozzi - Coro & Orchestra dell'Accademia di Santa Cecilia (Decca, 1958)
- Francesco Cilea - Adriana Lecouvreur - Renata Tebaldi, Mario Del Monaco, Giulietta Simionato, Giulio Fioravanti - Coro & Orchestra dell'Accademia di Santa Cecilia (Decca, 1961)
- Giuseppe Verdi - Aida, Arena di Verona 9 Agosoto 1966; Leyla Gencer (soprano), Carlo Bergonzi (tenor), Fiorenza Cossotto (mezzo), Anselmo Colzani (baritone).
