= Maria Dragoni =

Italian operatic soprano

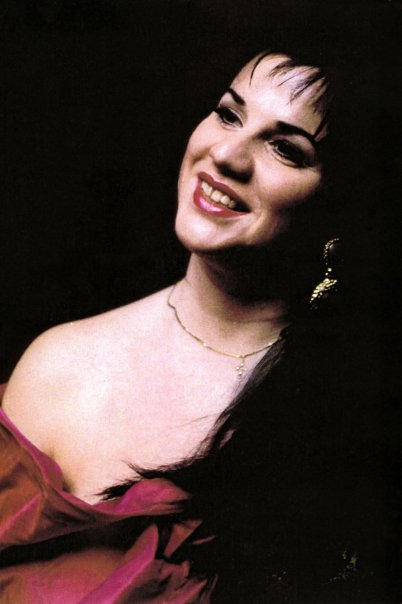
Maria Dragoni

Maria Dragoni (born 22 December 1958) is an Italian operatic soprano with an active international career in major opera houses from 1984 to present.

== Life and career ==
Born in Procida, Dragoni was trained at the "Licinio Refice" Music Conservatory in Frosinone. She studied singing there with Maria Alòs, wife of pianist Arnaldo Graziosi. In 1979 she joined the RAI Chorus in Rome. In that city she studied singing with Duchess Melina Pignatelli della Leonessa. She later pursued further studies in Naples with Rodolfo Celletti and Gina Cigna. In 1981 she won the Maria Callas Award at the International Vincenzo Bellini Competition in Caltanissetta and in 1983 she won the International Maria Callas Competition at the Foro Italico to Rome.

Dragoni made her professional opera debut in 1984 as Imogene in Vincenzo Bellini's Il pirata at the Teatro Pergolesi in Jesi. Later that year she made her debut at the Teatro di San Carlo in Naples in the title role of Giovanni Battista Pergolesi's rarely performed opera, Il Flaminio. She repeated that role the following year at the Internationale Maifestspiele Wiesbaden. In 1986 she sang Imogene for her debut at the Teatro Massimo in Palermo, and portrayed the role again in 1987 for a return engagement in Naples. She was also celebrated in Naples that year as Adalgisa in Bellini's Norma and made her debut that year at the Opéra national de Montpellier.

In 1988 Dragoni made her debut at La Scala as Fenena in Giuseppe Verdi's Nabucco. She also made her debuts that year at the Opéra national de Lorraine and the Ravenna Festival in the title role of Giacomo Puccini's Turandot. In 1989 she made her debut at the Macerata Opera Festival in the title role of Verdi's Aida. She also had a triumphant debut that year at the Théâtre des Champs-Élysées as Mathilde in Gioachino Rossini's William Tell.

In 1990 Dragoni was committed to the Teatro Regio Torino. In 1991 she gave her first performance at the Teatro dell'Opera di Roma as Donna Anna in Wolfgang Amadeus Mozart's Don Giovanni and made her debut at the Opéra national du Rhin in the title role of Rossini's Semiramide. In 1992 she sang Elisabetta in Verdi's Don Carlos at the Arena di Verona Festival and returned to Naples to sing her first Mimì in Puccini's La bohème. The following year she sang the title role in Norma at the Teatro di San Carlo and La Fenice; repeating that role in 1994 at the Arena di Verona and the Teatro Carlo Felice and in 1995 at the Zurich Opera. She returned to the Opéra national du Rhin in 1996 to sing Elvira in Verdi's Ernani. She was also heard in Napeles that year as Gulnara in Verdi's Il Corsaro. In 1999 she performed the title role in the first modern performance of Giuseppe Persiani's Ines de Castro at the Teatro Pergolesi.

SInce then, Dragoni has maintained an active presence in major opera houses internationally. Some of the other roles she has performed on stage include Abigail in Nabucco, Amelia in Verdi's Un ballo in maschera, Elvira in Bellini's I puritani, Hélène in Verdi's Jérusalem, Julia in Gaspare Spontini's La vestale, Lady Macbeth in Verdi's Macbeth, Leonora in Verdi's Il trovatore, Leonora in Verdi's La forza del destino, Madame Herz in Mozart's Der Schauspieldirektor, Minnie in Puccini's La fanciulla del West, Odabella in Verdi's Attila, Paolina in Gaetano Donizetti's Poliuto, Santuzza in Pietro Mascagni's Cavalleria Rusticana, Viclinda in Verdi's I Lombardi alla prima crociata, and the title roles in Donizetti's Anna Bolena, Amilcare Ponchielli's La Gioconda, Donizetti's Lucia di Lammermoor, Luigi Cherubini's Médée, Puccini's Suor Angelica, and Puccini's Tosca.
