= Rosa Raisa =

Russian opera singer

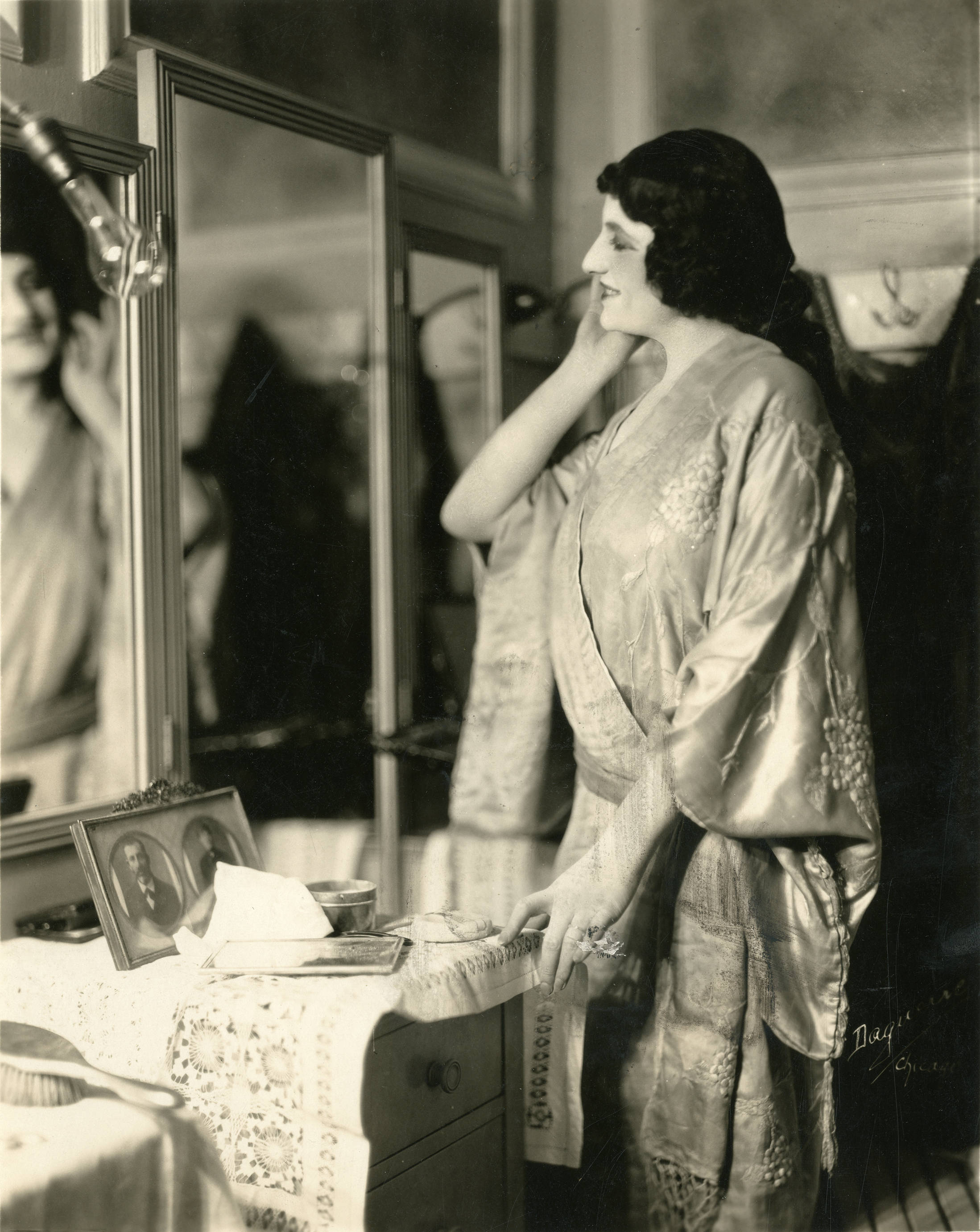
- Raisa in 1924
- Born: Raitza Burchstein; 23 May 1893; Białystok, Belostoksky Uyezd, Russian Empire
- Died: 28 September 1963 (aged 70); Los Angeles, US
- Burial place: Holy Cross Cemetery, Culver City, California
- Occupation: Operatic dramatic soprano
- Organizations: Chicago Opera Association

Rosa Raisa (23 May 1893 – 28 September 1963) was a Polish-born and Italian-trained Russian and Jewish operatic dramatic soprano who became a naturalized American. She possessed a voice of remarkable power and was the creator of the title role of Puccini's last opera, Turandot, at La Scala, Milan.

== Life and career ==
=== Early life and operatic beginnings ===
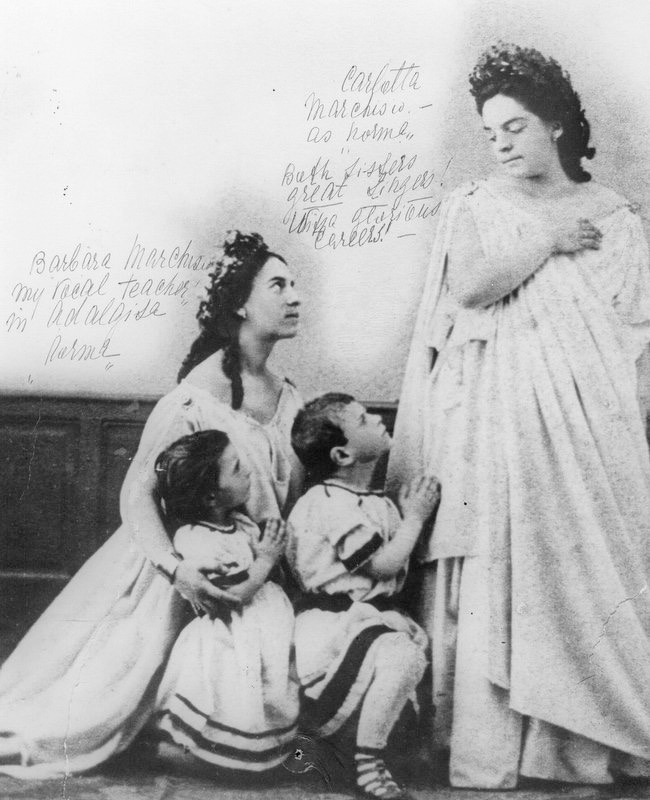
Raisa annotated this photo of her teacher Barbara Marchisio and her sister Carlotta, planning to use it in her autobiography. "Barbara Marchisio my vocal teacher in Adalgisa Norma. Carlotta Marchisio as Norma. Both sisters great singers with glorious careers." (1860s)

She was born as Raitza Burchstein, the daughter of Herschel and Frieda Leah Burchstein, in Białystok (Tsarist Russia, now Poland) in 1893. Some of her family fled Russia when she was 14 due to the pogroms, emigrating to Italy. There Raitza met Dario Ascarelli, who recognized her talent and potential and sponsored her at the Naples Conservatory (San Pietro a Majella). Her teacher at the conservatory, the contralto Barbara Marchisio (1833–1919), had been one of the most prominent Italian singers of the mid-19th century.

Marchisio brought Raisa in 1912 to Cleofonte Campanini, a leading operatic conductor and impresario. After the audition, he engaged the 20-year-old singer for the 1913 Parma Verdi Centenary (which included Oberto, Conte di San Bonifacio and Un ballo in maschera), and also signed her for his Philadelphia-Chicago Opera. As she was under 21 years of age, these engagements were confirmed by handshake.

=== Debuts in Europe and America ===
Debuts and successes followed rapidly for Raisa. Her North American debut was on 14 November 1913 with Campanini's Chicago-Philadelphia Opera Company in Baltimore as Mimí in Puccini's La bohème with Giovanni Martinelli of the Metropolitan Opera as Rodolfo in his first season in North America. (Martinelli was also her partner in 1937 in her last stage appearance of her career in Halévy's La Juive in Chicago). Her first role in Philadelphia was Isabella of Aragon in the United States premiere of Alberto Franchetti's Cristoforo Colombo, followed by Verdi's Aida on 29 November 1913 at the Auditorium Theatre in Chicago. Edward Moore, then critic for the Chicago Tribune, stated that hers was "a voice the like of whose power had never been heard on that stage".

She added several roles to her stage repertoire with the Chicago-Philadelphia company: Santuzza in Mascagni's Cavalleria rusticana (Dallas), Donna Anna in Mozart's Don Giovanni (Philadelphia), Klytemnestra in Vittorio Gnecchi's Cassandra (Philadelphia—Western Hemisphere premiere), and Elsa in Lohengrin in English (Seattle).

In the spring of 1914 she went to London where she debuted at Covent Garden in Aida with Enrico Caruso, participated as Helen of Troy in Boito's Mefistofele with Claudia Muzio, John McCormack and Adamo Didur, and substituted for Claire Dux as the Countess in Mozart's Le nozze di Figaro. The London company went to Paris where she sang her only Nedda in Leoncavallo's Pagliacci, and again sang Amelia in Verdi's Un ballo in maschera. In November 1914 publisher Tito Ricordi, who had personally auditioned Raisa in his studio, recommended her to the management of the Modena opera for a long run (Raisa recalled nineteen performances) of Riccardo Zandonai's new opera, Francesca da Rimini, first performed in Turin only a few months earlier.

This led to an engagement at the Teatro Costanzi in Rome for more Francescas, Aidas and two novelties: Fedra, a prize-winning opera premiere by a young Romano Romani (later Rosa Ponselle's coach and mentor) and Abul by Brazilian Alberto Nepomuceno. Emma Carelli, a soprano who had become the director of the Rome Opera, introduced Raisa to her husband Walter Mocchi, who organized opera programs in Buenos Aires. There was a long-standing tradition of Italian artists boarding ships after the end of the opera season in Italy and performing in the Southern Hemisphere's reverse seasons, the autumn and winter months in South America.

Mocchi took Raisa to South America in May 1915 for a long season, first in Buenos Aires and Rosario in Argentina, Montevideo in Uruguay and São Paulo, Rio de Janeiro and Porto Alegre in Brazil. In addition to her Francescas and Aidas (including another with Caruso) she added Meyerbeer's L'Africana also starring Titta Ruffo, and sang the Marschallin in the South American premiere of Der Rosenkavalier by Richard Strauss in Italian with Gilda dalla Rizza as Octavian and the then unknown Amelita Galli-Curci as Sophie. All these operas were conducted by Gino Marinuzzi, who for many years championed Raisa.

=== La Scala and Puccini ===
Raisa made her La Scala debut as Francesca upon her return from South America. She performed many Francescas and Aidas as well as Lida in Verdi's rare early opera La battaglia di Legnano at the Scala. After her Francesca at La Scala, she encountered Giacomo Puccini, who visited her after the performance. He was very taken with her performance and potential, Raisa later told the press, that when she asked him which of his operas he thought best for her to tackle, Puccini said: "there is no opera I have written to which your voice is not suited; they are all the same for you." He told her he wanted her to create his next opera (still a work in progress, La rondine) Whether he was more entranced with her youth and beauty or her vocal powers is unknown, but his plan for this assumption of Magda was advanced enough that in January 1917 she was announced in the world press for the premiere of this light opera in Monte Carlo. Raisa did not go to Monte Carlo as she was in the United States and was fearful of the submarine warfare at that stage of the Great War. At about the same time Puccini first encountered Raisa, Arturo Toscanini heard her and told his friends in the opera world that he considered Raisa a "female Tamagno", more appropriate for the heroic Turandot she would create nine years later.

In 1916 she reprised her Francescas and Aidas at the Rome Opera and returned to South America for another exhausting season, adding Alfredo Catalani's Loreley, Valentina in Meyerbeer's Gli Ugonotti (Les Huguenots) and Alice Ford in Verdi's Falstaff to her repertoire. Falstaff was to play a part in her career for it gave her an only chance to play the non-title role in an opera with baritone Giacomo Rimini, at that time her lover and after 1920 her husband. In August 1916 Campanini elaborated to the Chicago Tribune his plans for the upcoming 1916–17 season of the Chicago Opera Association (no longer the Chicago-Philadelphia Opera Company), and clearly building up the return of Raisa to Chicago, quoting Caruso, "he considers Rosa Raisa the greatest dramatic soprano in the world." The only problem with Campanini's prediction was that Amelita Galli-Curci was to take Chicago, and the world by storm and she ultimately became the attraction of the company.

=== Chicago years ===
After her return to Chicago in 1916, Raisa, along with Mary Garden, Edith Mason, Claudia Muzio, and Galli-Curci, were the lead sopranos around which the repertoire of the company revolved.

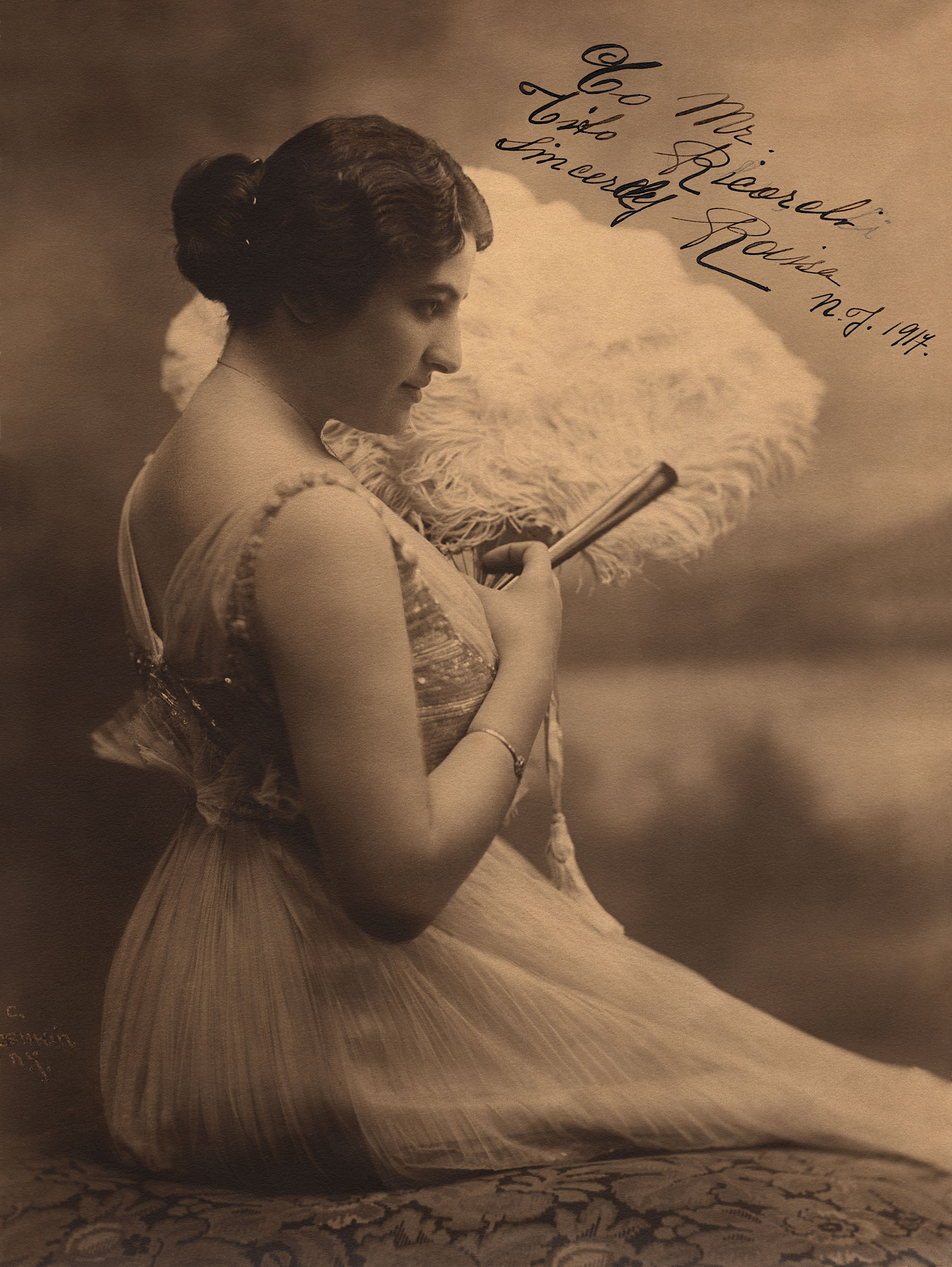
Portrait photograph of Rosa Raisa in 1917, with an autograph dedication to the Italian publisher Tito II Ricordi

Essentially Raisa was the company's dramatic soprano, Garden the French-repertory soprano, Galli-Curci the light coloratura, Mason a lyric, and Muzio a spinto soprano. Of all these, Muzio was the only one to share some roles with Raisa (Leonora in Verdi's Il trovatore, Desdemona in Otello, Aida, Santuzza, and Puccini's Tosca). Raisa was the company's only Maliella in Wolf-Ferrari's I gioielli della Madonna (Jewels of the Madonna), Gioconda, Amelia in Verdi's Un ballo in maschera (always billed as Masked Ball in Chicago), Rachel in Meyerbeer's La Juive (always announced as The Jewess in Chicago), and Bellini's Norma. This is significant as Claudia Muzio had performed Norma with some success in Italy and South America, but staked no claim to the role over Raisa in Chicago.

Raisa, over the next 16 seasons (1916–17 through 1931–32), sang almost five hundred times in Chicago and on its transnational tours. She also sang two long seasons in Mexico (1917 and 1919) returned to South America for three more seasons (1918, 1921, and 1929). She sang Norma in Buenos Aires, singing it 22 times there in three seasons. The title role of Lo schiavo by Antônio Carlos Gomes was added to her role list in Latin America. In Chicago she added Maddalena in Andrea Chénier, Zina in Raoul Gunsbourg's Le Vieil Aigle, Isabeau in the North American premiere of Mascagni's opera, Basiliola in Italo Montemezzi's La Nave, Puccini's Suor Angelica, Elisabeth in Wagner's Tannhäuser, Minnie in Puccini's La fanciulla del West, Puccini's Madama Butterfly (at the Ravinia Festival outside Chicago, also Giordano's Fedora at Ravinia), Toinette in Frank Harling's jazz opera A Light from St. Agnes, Rosalinde in an English-language Die Fledermaus by Johann Strauss, and Zandonai's Conchita.

=== World premieres: Turandot and Asteria ===
Raisa also famously added to her repertoire the role of Asteria in Boito's posthumous opera, Nerone (1924), and the title role in Puccini's Turandot (1926) at Toscanini's La Scala, both world premieres in the most lavish Scala productions of that storied era. In Raisa's version of the Nerone rehearsals, Puccini managed to enter into the auditorium at an early rehearsal and Toscanini had a tantrum when he realized Puccini was in the house, as it was his firm policy that no one was to be present at the early rehearsals prior to the final dress rehearsal at which the Milanese opera establishment would be invited, no exceptions, not even for Puccini. It fell to Raisa to escort Puccini to the stage door; it was then that Puccini, who had heard some of the early scenes of the Boito opera which featured some stentorian high notes, told Raisa that he was writing Turandot, "It is a role I can just see you and hear you" and he wanted her to create it, telling her that only the final scene still had to be composed. In an interview with the Chicago Tribune the day after word came that Puccini died in Brussels, Raisa told the newspaper that she had playfully told Puccini that he better "be sure to put in plenty of high Cs".

On 7 October 1924, less than two months before Puccini died, Angelo Scandiani, administrative director of La Scala, wired Herbert Johnson of the Chicago Opera that Puccini and Toscanini had cast three Chicago Opera artists, Rosa Raisa, Edith Mason, and Giacomo Rimini, for the lead roles in the upcoming Turandot. At that time it was thought that the premiere would take place in April 1925, but Puccini's death at the end of November 1924 postponed these plans; Franco Alfano was selected to compose the final scene from Puccini's sketches.

The premiere was on 25 April 1926 with Raisa as Turandot, Miguel Fleta as Calaf, and Maria Zamboni, a Scala lyric soprano as Liu, replacing Mason who was pregnant. It is at this performance that Toscanini stopped the performance at the place Puccini stopped composing, addressing the audience with essentially these words "here is where the Maestro died." John Gutman of the Metropolitan Opera in a 1962 interview with Raisa asked her if the artists knew that Toscanini would make this gesture. Raisa said that there were rumblings backstage that something like this might happen, but the artists were never told this officially; therefore, they were somewhat, but not totally, surprised. There is anecdotal information that Puccini on his deathbed had asked Toscanini to make such a gesture at the premiere, but this is not possible to confirm.

=== New Chicago Opera House: First broadcasts ===
On 4 November 1929, Raisa was awarded the honor of opening the new Chicago Civic Opera House in a performance of Aida (broadcast throughout the USA) with a stellar cast personally selected by Civic Opera president Samuel Insull, the Chicago industrialist who later ran foul of the law. Raisa and Rimini invested their considerable earnings in Insull securities (actually a ponzi scheme) and eventually lost their fortune, on paper estimated in the range of a million dollars.

Most people in the United States believe that high quality opera broadcasts started with the Metropolitan Opera in 1931. The Chicago Opera was broadcasting nationally since 1927, every week for one hour; Mary Garden, Claudia Muzio, Frida Leider, Raisa, Tito Schipa, Eva Turner, Alexander Kipnis and Vanni-Marcoux are some of the headliners who were heard on the radio across America. It is doubtful that any of these transmissions have been preserved.

=== 1933: Last performances on stage ===
1933 is the last year that Raisa performed a reasonably full schedule. Since January 1931 when she left the stage to prepare for the birth of her daughter, having had six unsuccessful pregnancies, many things happened: the demise of the Chicago Opera, the world-wide deteriorating economic situation and a general contraction of operatic activity in the United States. But Raisa sang a run of Tosca in Genoa, created Manuela in Zandonai's one-act opera Una partita at La Scala, sang Alice Ford in Falstaff with Rimini at the first Maggio Musicale Fiorentino, Tosca in the presence of Queen Mary at Covent Garden. She recorded four verismo arias for La voce del padrone in Milan, and sang five performances of Gli Ugonotti at the Arena in Verona with Giacomo Lauri-Volpi and a stellar cast. She can be seen, but not heard, in an edited version of the act 4 love duet with Lauri-Volpi as Raoul.

=== Concerts ===
Rosa Raisa married the Italian baritone Giacomo Rimini (1888–1952) in 1920; the couple had first met five years earlier and were inseparable lovers. Rimini was descended from Sephardic Jews on his father's side and his mother was Hungarian-Italian. Rimini was raised as a Catholic. Their careers merged and after retirement in 1938 they opened a voice/opera school together in Chicago, first at the historic Congress Hotel, across from the Auditorium Theatre, and during World War II they moved to North Michigan Avenue. Their daughter Rosa Giulietta Frieda Rimini was born 7 July 1931.

They sang hundreds of concerts together, especially in the United States, many of them sponsored by Jewish groups as Raisa had become a beloved ethnic icon. Her concerts were almost always with Rimini, she singing two-thirds of the concert, he one-third. In their concerts they closed the first half and the end, with duets. The most frequent duets they sang were "Là ci darem la mano" from Don Giovanni where they could be outwardly playful and sexy. The act 4 duet from Il trovatore was often given at the end of the printed program. It is fascinating that they often sang after the first half of a concert a duet from Verdi's Luisa Miller, giving Raisa an opportunity to do some flashy coloratura and ending on a high C. She often closed her recitals with the Yiddish song "Eili, Eili". "Eili Eili" is a Yiddish song starting with the Hebrew words 'Eili, Eili', ("God, why have you forsaken us?") and ending with the Jewish credo, "Sh'mah Yisroel" ("Hear O Israel, the Lord our God, the Lord is One.") This song exists in several arrangements. Raisa had the popular music composer Joseph Bonomie arrange the song for her voice. Her 1918 recording is remarkable for it shows the cello-like coloring of the lower voice, the liquid middle register, as well as the ease of her upper. She sings the song with great feeling, appropriately sobbing on key words. It was reported that she often sang this song with her eyes closed.

== Death ==
Raisa suffered from cancer, having undergone a double mastectomy in the 1940s. She died in Los Angeles, California, on 28 September 1963, and her granddaughter, Suzanne Homme, told Raisa's biographer Charles Mintzer that her death certificate listed "bone cancer" as the immediate cause of death. She was buried in Holy Cross Cemetery, Culver City.

== Recordings ==
Raisa's relatively few recordings (from 1917 to 1933 for four different record companies, Pathe, Vocalion, Brunswick, and Italian HMV) reveal a beautiful timbre and a florid technique rare in singers of her type. Her famous vocal power, almost always mentioned in reviews, can only be detected in a few of the recordings. An anthology of these recordings was issued in 1998 on CD by Marston Records (53001-2). The Marston issue also contains an audio interview with Raisa, while its liner notes feature valuable biographical information about her and an evaluation of her voice.

Almost all the reviews of her live performances express astonishment at her phenomenal vocal power. Only on the electric Italian HMVs can some of that power be detected. Alan Kelly, the HMV expert and historian told Larry Lustig of The Record Collector magazine that the company's logs of that May 1933 recording session had notes: "bad" microphone technique and "blasting". She had to be placed in the middle of the orchestra to achieve some reasonable balance. The HMVs do not show Raisa's voice at its freshest, but the voice is still golden and beautiful, with magisterial delivery, and a sense of her unusual power. Lauri-Volpi in his seminal book on singers of his experience and knowledge, Voci Parallele, states that by 1933 Raisa's voice was but an x-ray of how he remembered her earlier in her career.
