= Lina Bruna Rasa =

Italian operatic soprano (1907–1984)

Lina Bruna Rasa as Santuzza in Cavalleria rusticana, her signature role

Lina Bruna Rasa (24 September 1907 – 20 September 1984) was an Italian operatic dramatic soprano. She was particularly noted for her performances in the verismo repertoire and was a favourite of Pietro Mascagni who considered her the ideal Santuzza. Bruna Rasa created the roles of Atte in Mascagni's Nerone, Cecilia Sagredo in Franco Vittadini's La Sagredo and Saint Clare in Licinio Refice's 1926 oratorio, Trittico Francescano. She also sang the role of Tsaritsa Militrisa in the Italian premiere of Nikolai Rimsky-Korsakov's The Tale of Tsar Saltan.

== Biography ==
Lina Bruna Rasa was born at Padua and began her music studies at age 14, studying with Guido Palumbo and Italiano Tabarin in her native Padua, and later in Milan with Manlio Bavagnoli. Her appearance in a 1925 concert at the Teatro La Fenice singing the "Suicidio" aria from La Gioconda created a sensation. By the end of that year, at the age of 18 she made her operatic debut singing the role of Elena in Boito's Mefistofele at the Teatro Politeama in Genoa. She made her debut at the Teatro Regio in Turin in the same role on 21 February 1926 and was engaged by Toscanini to sing Elena for the opening of the 1927 season at La Scala where she made her debut on 16 November 1927. She went on to sing in many notable performances there including the world premieres of Mascagni's Nerone, Franco Vittadini's La Sagredo, the Italian premiere of Rimsky-Korsakov's The Tale of Tsar Saltan and some of the earliest performances Wolf-Ferrari's Sly, Vincenzo Michetti's La Maddalena, and Respighi's La campana sommersa. In a departure from her usual repertoire, she sang Mathilde for La Scala's celebration of the 100th anniversary of Rossini's William Tell.

In the years between 1926 and 1933 Bruna Rasa sang throughout Italy as well as in Montecarlo, Nice, Lausanne and Barcelona where she sang Aida at the city's Gran Teatre del Liceu. Further afield, she travelled to Egypt in 1927 where she sang in Aida and Omòniza in Cairo's Teatro Reale. In 1929, she was engaged by the theatrical impresario, Faustino Da Rosa, for a series of performances in South America. She made her debut at the Teatro Colón in Buenos Aires on 14 June 1929 as Maddalena de Coigny in Andrea Chénier with Georges Thill as Chénier. She also sang there in Cavalleria Rusticana, Tosca, and La campana sommersa in its South American premiere. In August, Da Rosa's singers went on to Uruguay where she sang Andrea Chénier (again with Thill) and Tosca at the Teatro Solis in Montevideo.

Bruna Rasa's earliest assumptions of Santuzza in Cavalleria rusticana, the role for which she is best remembered today, were in 1927 in Lausanne and Bari. The opera's composer, Pietro Mascagni, and Bruna Rasa met for the first time in Venice in July 1928 when he conducted a performance of Cavalleria Rusticana in the Piazza San Marco before a crowd of 35,000 people. Mascagni was struck by her dramatic intensity and her powerful yet beautiful voice. She was to become his favourite Santuzza. He subsequently conducted many of her performances in the role both in Italy and abroad and chose her for the 1940 recording of Cavalleria rusticana which marked the 50th anniversary of its premiere. It is the only full-length studio recording of the work which is conducted by Mascagni himself.

In the early 1930s Bruna Rasa had begun showing signs of the mental illness which was to cause her premature retirement from the stage. This worsened with the death of her mother in 1935. She suffered a severe breakdown which led to her spending increasingly longer periods away from the stage, often in sanatoriums. Gino Bechi who sang with her on the 1940 Cavalleria rusticana recording recalled that during the recording sessions she would insistently ask him if he had noticed the white horses in the wings that she believed were waiting to take her away, but would become completely lucid when the music began. The tenor Giovanni Breviario who sang with her in Lecco in 1941 recalled:

"Her marvelous voice came to life as soon as she began her scenes. This happened only onstage. We were all very affectionate toward her, but when not on the stage, she was passive, apathetic, would not speak and remained doggedly clinging to her handbag."

On 20 July 1942, she sang in Cavalleria rusticana at the outdoor arena in Pesaro. It was to be her final performance in a staged opera. Lina Bruna Rasa spent the last 36 years of her life in a mental hospital in Milan, where she died.

== Roles ==
In addition to the stage roles listed below, Bruna Rasa also sang in radio performances of Rito Selvaggi's Maggiolata veneziana and Giordano's Fedora.

- Aida in Aida
- Sélika in L'Africaine
- Maddalena de Coigny in Andrea Chénier
- Amelia in Un ballo in maschera
- Magda in La campana sommersa
- Carmen in Carmen
- Santuzza and Lucia in Cavalleria rusticana
- Leonora in La forza del destino
- Ricke in Germania
- Gioconda in La Gioconda
- Mathilde in Guglielmo Tell
- Isabeau in Isabeau
- Loreley in Loreley
- Maddalena in La Maddalena
- Elena and Margherita in Mefistofele
- Atte in Nerone
- Omòniza in Omòniza
- Desdemona in Otello
- Elisabetta (?) in I pittori fiamminghi
- Cecilia Sagredo in La Sagredo
- Dolly in Sly
- Tsaritsa Militrisa in The Tale of Tsar Saltan
- Venus in Tannhäuser
- Tosca in Tosca
- St. Clare in Trittico Francescano
- Leonora in Il trovatore
- Wally in La Wally
- Silvia in Zanetto

== Recordings ==
- Andrea Chénier (Luigi Marini, Lina Bruna Rasa, Carlo Galeffi, Salvatore Baccaloni; La Scala Orchestra and Chorus; Lorenzo Molajoli, conductor). Originally recorded in 1931. Label: Naxos Historical 811006667
- Cavalleria rusticana (Beniamino Gigli, Lina Bruna Rasa, Gino Bechi, Giulietta Simionato; La Scala Orchestra and Chorus; Pietro Mascagni, conductor). Originally recorded in 1940. Label: EMI Studio 69987 (also issued on Naxos Historical 811071415)
- Fedora (Gilda Dalla Rizza, Emilio Ghirardini, Antonio Melandri; La Scala Orchestra and Chorus; Lorenzo Molajoli, conductor). This album also contains extracts from the 1931 Andrea Chénier (above) and extra tracks of Lina Bruna Rasa singing: "L'altra notte in fondo al mare" and "Spunta l'aurora pallida" from Mefistofele; "In quelle trine morbide" from Manon Lescaut; "Vissi d'arte" from Tosca; "Rivedrai le foreste imbalsamate" (with Carlo Galeffi) from Aida; and "Voi lo sapete, o Mamma" from Cavalleria rusticana. Label: Gala 758

== Notes and references ==
- Campion, Paul (2000) Liner Notes, Andrea Chénier, (Naxos 811006667). Accessed 9 October 2008.
- Dryden, Konrad (2004) "Zandonai: Mascagni's «Student»", mascagni.org. Accessed 9 October 2008.
- Flury, Roger (2001) Pietro Mascagni: A Bio-bibliography, Greenwood Publishing Group. ISBN 0-313-29662-6
- Casaglia, Gherardo (2005). "Bruna Rasa". L'Almanacco di Gherardo Casaglia (in Italian).
- Innaurato, Albert "Tempo di Mascagni", Opera News. January 2000. Accessed via subscription 9 October 2008.
- Mallach, Alan, (2002) Pietro Mascagni and His Operas, University Press of New England, p. 280. ISBN 1-55553-524-0
- Plate, Leonor (2006) Operas Teatro Colón: Esperando el centenario, Editorial Dunken. ISBN 987-02-2012-6
- Rideout, Robert (1999) "Lina Brusa Rasa (1907-1984)".
- Rosenthal, H. and Warrack, J. (1979) "Rasa, Lina Bruna" in The Concise Oxford Dictionary of Opera, 2nd Edition, Oxford University Press. p. 409. ISBN 0-19-311321-X
- Salgado, Susana (2003) The Teatro Solís: 150 Years of Opera, Concert, and Ballet in Montevideo, Wesleyan University Press. ISBN 0-8195-6594-6
