= Anselmo Colzani =

Italian opera singer

- Anselmo Colzani (photo with 1951 dedication)

Background information
- Born: Budrio, near Bologna, Italy
- Died: March 19, 2006 (aged 87) Milan
- Genres: Opera
- Years active: 1946-1980

Anselmo Colzani (March 28, 1918 – March 19, 2006) was an Italian operatic baritone who had an international opera career from the late 1940s through 1980. He particularly excelled in the Italian repertory and was most associated with the works of Giuseppe Verdi and Giacomo Puccini. He began his career in Italy in 1947 where he quickly became a regular presence at that country's best opera houses, including La Scala. In the mid-1950s he began appearing at major opera houses throughout Europe and the United States. In 1960 he joined the roster at the Metropolitan Opera where he spent most of his time through 1978. Opera News commented that while his voice may have "lacked the sheer beauty [of other baritones], his performances had an Italianate urgency and forthright thrust that were unique, which established himself as a powerful, striking presence."

== Early life and education ==
Colzani was born in Budrio, near Bologna, Italy into a family of talented amateur musicians. His parents encouraged him in musical pursuits as a child but he did not pursue seriously until years later. In 1936, at the age of eighteen, he joined the Italian Army where he served during World War II. It wasn't until towards the end of the war that he started pursuing serious studies with Corrado Zambelli in Bologna.

== Early career and rise to international fame ==
Colzani made his stage debut in 1947 at the Teatro Comunale Bologna, as the Herald in Wagner's Lohengrin alongside Renata Tebaldi who was making her first appearance at that opera house singing Elsa. A few years later he was invited back to that house to sing the title role in Verdi's Rigoletto, a performance which greatly rose his profile as an opera singer. His career truly took off with his 1952 debut at La Scala in Milan, as Alfio in Mascagni's Cavalleria rusticana, other roles included de Sirex in Giordano's Fedora, Escamillo in Bizet's Carmen, Marcello in Puccini's La bohème, and Telramund in Lohengrin among others. He took part in the creation of Darius Milhaud's David, in 1955, and sang Thoas in Gluck's Iphigénie en Tauride, opposite Maria Callas in 1957. He made his first appearance at the Teatro dell'Opera di Roma in 1954 as Telramund and returned there many times throughout his career. In 1955 he made his first appearance at the Baths of Caracalla music festival as Severo in Donizetti's Poliuto. He also appeared regularly at the opera houses in Genoa, Naples, Palermo, and at the Verona Arena.

Outside Italy, he appeared at many houses throughout Europe and in the United States. In 1955 he made his first appearance at the Teatro Nacional Sao Carlos in Lisbon as Alfio. In 1956 he made his American debut at the San Francisco Opera as Count di Luna in Verdi's Il trovatore. He sang several more roles with that house that season including Amonasro in Verdi's Aida, Gianciotto in Zandonai's Francesca da Rimini, Sharpless in Puccini's Madama Butterfly, and Scarpia in Puccini's Tosca. In 1957 he made his first appearance with the Vienna State Opera as Iago in Verdi's Otello. In 1959 he sang in the world premiere of Luciano Chailly's La riva delle sirti at the Monte Carlo Opera and made his debut at the Lyric Opera of Chicago. In 1960 he made his debut with the Philadelphia Lyric Opera Company as Amonasro with Leontyne Price in the title role. In 1966 he sang Amonasro for the inauguration of Jesse H. Jones Hall for the Performing Arts with the Houston Grand Opera.

== The Metropolitan Opera years ==
In March 1960 Colzani was approached by Rudolf Bing, General Manager of the Metropolitan Opera in New York City, with an invitation to join the roster at the Met after the sudden death of Leonard Warren during a performance of La forza del destino left a vacancy at the house. He agreed and on April 7, 1960, Colzani made his debut at the Met in the title role of Verdi's Simon Boccanegra with Renata Tebaldi as Amelia, Richard Tucker as Gabriele Adorno, Jerome Hines as Jacopo Fiesco, and Dimitri Mitropoulos conducting. He stayed with the company for sixteen more seasons, portraying such roles as Amonasro, Barnaba in Ponchielli's La Gioconda, Don Carlo in Verdi's La forza del destino, Enrico in Donizetti's Lucia di Lammermoor, Gérard in Giordano's Andrea Chénier, Iago, Jack Rance in Puccini's La fanciulla del west, Scarpia, Tonio in Leoncavallo's Pagliacci, and the title roles in Falstaff, Macbeth, Nabucco, and Rigoletto among others.

Colzani's most frequent role at the Met was Scarpia; portraying the role more than forty times. Opera News stated that, "Undoubtedly Colzani's highest-profile assignment at the Met was Falstaff in the first performances of Franco Zeffirelli's much-loved 1964 production of Verdi's opera, conducted at its premiere by Leonard Bernstein." His final and 272nd performance at the Met was on February 16, 1978, as Michonnet in Adriana Lecouvreur with Montserrat Caballé in the title role, José Carreras as Maurizio, Mignon Dunn as Princess di Bouillon, and conductor Jesús López-Cobos.

== Later life ==
After leaving the Met in 1978, Colzani continued performing for two more years, making his last appearance on the opera stage as Scarpia in 1980. He retired to Milan where he died after a long illness in 2006. During his later years he enjoyed time with his family. He had two daughters, Bianca and Miriam, from his first marriage which ended when his first wife died at a very young age. He was married to his second wife, Ada, for more than 50 years.

In 2002 Colzani's home city, Budrio, established an annual international opera competition named in his honor.
