= Armando Borgioli =

Italian operatic singer

Armando Borgioli, 1943 photo with dedication

Armando Borgioli (19 March 1898 in Florence – 20 January 1945 in Milan-Modena train near Codogno) was an Italian operatic baritone. He made his début in 1923, and appeared at Teatro alla Scala from 1927. In four seasons from 1931 he appeared at the Metropolitan Opera in New York. Borgioli made studio recordings of Aida in 1928, where he sang opposite Giannina Arangi-Lombardi, and, in 1938, as Scarpia in Tosca with Maria Caniglia and Beniamino Gigli. Borgioli died when his car was bombed while driving to Parma to sing Marcello to Renata Tebaldi's first Mimi in La boheme. Also in the car was another baritone who was injured, yet replaced him in the role with a bandaged nose.

Armando Borgioli in Rigoletto, Teatro Colón (Buenos Aires), 1943

== Sources ==
- Metropolitan Opera, Performance record: Borgioli, Armando (Baritone) on the MetOpera Database
- Rosenthal, H. and Warrack, J. "Borgioli, Armando", The Concise Oxford Dictionary of Opera, 2nd Edition, Oxford University Press, 1979, p. 57
