= Aldo Protti =

Italian opera singer (1920–1995)

- Aldo Protti in Rigoletto (photo with 1951 dedication)
- Born: 19 July 1920; Cremona, Italy
- Died: 10 August 1995 (age 75); Cremona, Italy
- Occupation: baritone opera singer
- Years active: 1948–1985

Aldo Protti (19 July 1920 – 10 August 1995) was an Italian baritone opera singer, particularly associated with the Italian repertory. He was particularly appreciated in Verdi roles, especially Rigoletto, his greatest role, but also as Alfio, Tonio, Gérard, Scarpia, etc.

== Life and career ==
Protti was born in Cremona. He studied in Parma, and made his debut in Pesaro, as Figaro, in 1948. He made his La Scala debut in 1950, as Amonasro. He did not appear there again until 1954 when he performed the title role in Rigoletto; and after this he performed regularly at La Scala for many years. He sang widely in Italy and Europe in the standard Italian repertory, and was described in 1972 by Italian music critic as "one of the most reliable baritones in the business".

In 1956, Protti appeared with the New York City Opera, in Rigoletto (with Norman Treigle as Sparafucile), Tosca (in Vladimir Rosing's staging), and the company premiere of Il trovatore (with Pier Miranda Ferraro). He made a belated debut at the Metropolitan Opera, as Rigoletto, in John Dexter's production, in 1985, at the age of sixty-five.

Aldo Protti died in Cremona on 10 August 1995, aged seventy-five.

== Abridged discography ==
- Giordano: Andrea Chénier (Callas, del Monaco; Votto, 1955) [live] EMI
- Leoncavallo: Pagliacci (Petrella, del Monaco; Erede, 1952) Decca
- Leoncavallo: Pagliacci (Beltrami, Poggi; Rapalo, 1958) Philips
- Mascagni: Cavalleria rusticana (Nicolai, del Monaco; Ghione, 1954) Decca
- Mascagni: Cavalleria rusticana (Mancini, Poggi; Rapalo, 1958) Philips
- Verdi: Aida (Tebaldi, Stignani, del Monaco; Erede, 1952) Decca
- Verdi: Otello (Tebaldi, del Monaco; Erede, 1954) Decca
- Verdi: Otello (Tebaldi, del Monaco; Karajan, 1961) Decca
- Verdi: Rigoletto (Gueden, Simionato, del Monaco, Siepi; Erede, 1954) Decca
- Verdi: La traviata (Tebaldi, Poggi; Molinari-Pradelli, 1954) Decca
