= RCA Red Seal =

US record label

- Parent company: Sony Music Entertainment (2008–present); Sony BMG Music Entertainment (2004–2008); Bertelsmann Music Group (1987–2004); Radio Corporation of America (1929–1986); Victor Talking Machine Company (1902–1929)
- Founded: 1902; 124 years ago
- Founder: Eldridge R. Johnson
- Distributor: Sony Masterworks
- Genre: Classical
- Official website: www.sonymasterworks.com

RCA Red Seal is a classical music label whose origin dates to 1902 and is currently owned by Sony Music Entertainment.

== History ==
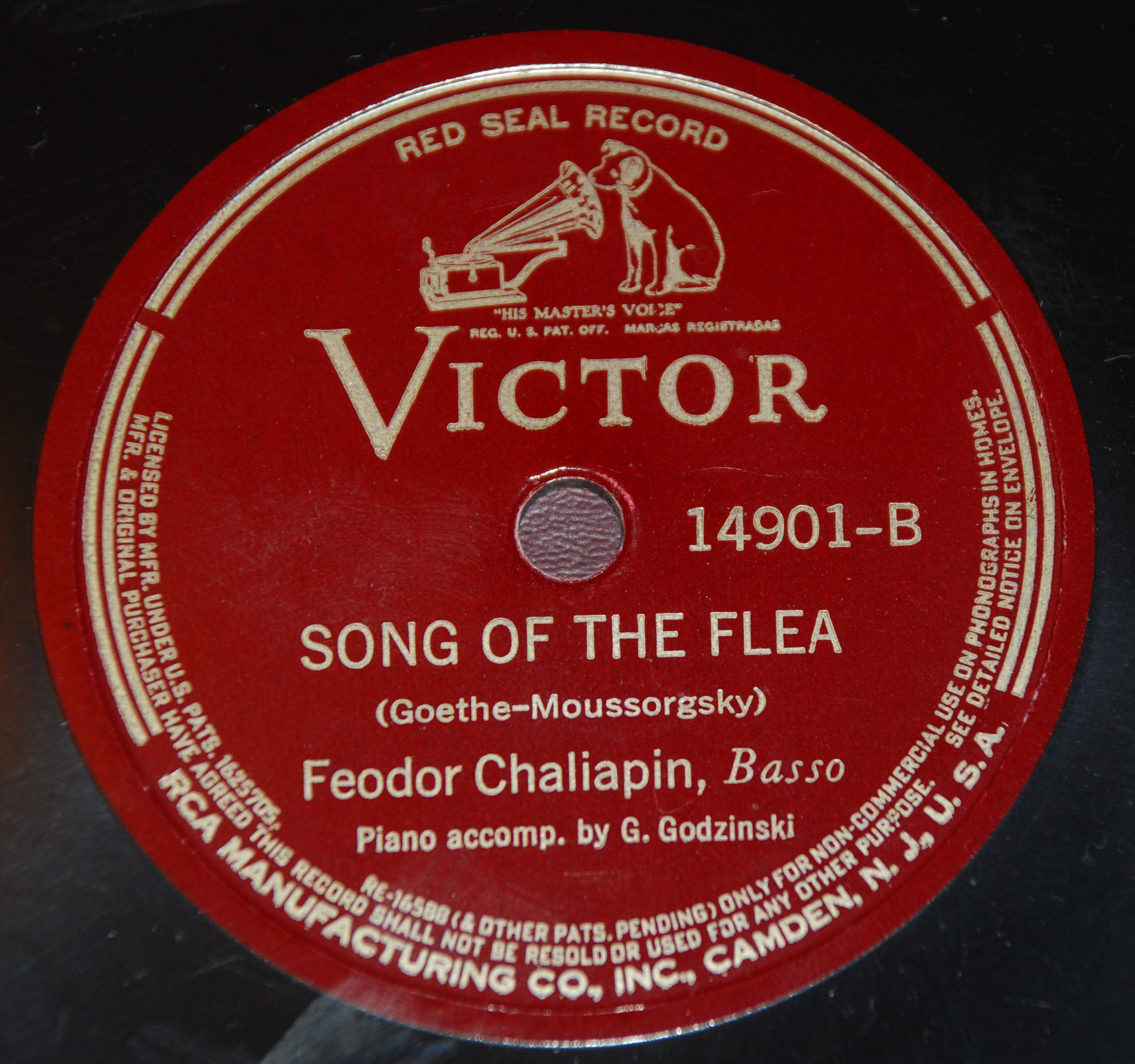
Victor Red Seal record circa 1940

The first "Gramophone Record Red Seal" discs were issued in 1901. Later in 1902 the practice was adopted by the home office in the United Kingdom, which preferred to refer to the records as "Red Labels", and by its United States affiliate, the Victor Talking Machine Company, in 1903. Led by the great Italian tenor Enrico Caruso, then just at the beginning of his worldwide fame, Victor Red Seal records changed the public's valuation of recorded music. Caruso's first records, made by the Gramophone Company in Milan, Italy in 1902, earned prestige as well as profits for the company and its affiliates. Five of Caruso's Milan records were issued by Victor on the Red Seal label in the United States in March, 1903 and soon other famous opera stars and classical instrumentalists were attracted to the studios of both Victor and the Gramophone Company, consolidating the positions of these firms as the market leaders in the field of serious music by famous artists. The first Red Seal discs recorded by Victor in the United States were of the Australian contralto Ada Crossley on April 30, 1903.

In 1950, RCA Victor began issuing vinyl microgroove LPs (originally introduced by Columbia Records in 1948), because they were losing artists and sales due to the company's resistance to adopting the new format.

== See also ==
- RCA Camden
- RCA Victrola
- List of record labels
