= Felipe Boero =

Argentine composer and music educator (1884–1958)

Felipe Boero (January 1, 1884 – August 9, 1958) was an Argentine composer and music educator.

He is most famous for composing the opera El Matrero, after a play by Yamandú Rodríguez, considered one of the national operas of Argentina; among his other works is the opera Tucumán, on a libretto by Leopoldo Díaz, about the Battle of Tucumán. He also was interested in education policy.

Boero was born and died in Buenos Aires. He began his studies with Pablo Beruti, later traveling to Paris to study at the Conservatory there; he worked with Paul Vidal, and while there became acquainted with the work of Gabriel Fauré, Camille Saint-Saëns, Claude Debussy, Maurice Ravel, and Manuel de Falla.
