= Giacomo Vaghi =

Italian opera singer

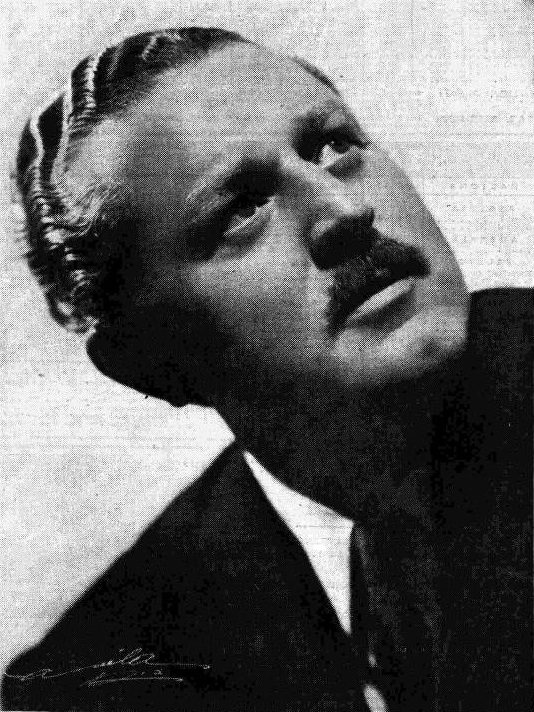
Giacomo Vaghi

Giacomo Vaghi (21 November 1901 - 29 April 1978) was an Italian opera singer who had an active international career from 1925-1956. Along with Tancredi Pasero and Ezio Pinza, he was one of the leading operatic basses of his generation. He possessed a rich voice with a dark timbre that drew him particular acclaim in the operas of Giuseppe Verdi. He appears on several complete opera recordings made with EMI Classics and Cetra Records.

== Life and career ==
Born in Como, Vaghi studied singing in Milan before making his debut in Jules Massenet's Manon at the Teatro di San Carlo in Naples in 1925. He appeared in several roles at that house the following year, including the role of Sintram in the Naples premiere of Riccardo Zandonai's I cavalieri di Ekebù. On 29 October 1927 he made his debut at the Teatro Comunale di Bologna as Timur in the house premiere of Giacomo Puccini's Turandot. He sang several other roles in Bologna in successive months, including Pimen in Boris Godunov, Alvise in La Gioconda, and Garcia/Sereno in Conchita.

In 1928 Vaghi joined the roster of singers at the Teatro dell'Opera di Roma, serving as that house's leading bass through 1939. He sang a broad repertoire at that house, including appearances in the world premieres Ildebrando Pizzetti's Lo straniero (1930, King Hanóch), Ermanno Wolf-Ferrari's La vedova scaltra (1931, Innkeeper), Licinio Refice's Cecilia (1934, Bishop Urbano), and Franco Alfano's Cyrano de Bergerac (1936, Carbon). He also worked as a guest artist at numerous opera houses and opera festivals while based in Rome. He made appearances at La Scala (1929–1931), the Teatro Comunale Florence (1929–1930), Arena di Verona Festival (1931), the Teatro Communale di Bologna (1931), and La Fenice (1938) among others.

From 1937-1941, Vaghi was a regular performer at the Teatro Colón in Buenos Aires. In 1945 he signed a contract with the Metropolitan Opera, making his debut at the house on 18 February 1946 as Colline in La bohème with Dorothy Kirsten as Mimì, Jan Peerce as Rodolfo, Frances Greer as Musetta, John Brownlee as Marcello, and Cesare Sodero conducting. He remained committed to that house for the next two and a half years, portraying Alvise in La Gioconda, Don Basilio in The Barber of Seville, Ferrando in Il trovatore, Nilakantha in Lakmé, Raimondo in Lucia di Lammermoor, Ramfis in Aida, Samuel in Un ballo in maschera, and Sparafucile in Rigoletto. In 1950 he appeared at the Maggio Musicale Fiorentino as Antigono in Gaspare Spontini's Olimpie. From 1951 until his retirement in 1956 he was once again committed to the Teatro dell'Opera di Roma. In 1952 he appeared at the Royal Opera, London as Oroveso in Norma with Maria Callas in the title role; a performance which was recorded and released on record. He died in Rome in 1978 at the age of 76.

Some of the other roles Vaghi created on stage were Alfonso in Lucrezia Borgia, Baldassarre in La favorite, Banquo in Macbeth, Basilio in Nerone, Blind man of Kinnèreth in Dèbora e Jaéle, Cacio in Il Guarany, Count Rodolfo in La sonnambula, Count Walter in Luisa Miller, Don Bartolo in The Barber of Seville, Don Fernando in Fidelio, Dosifey in Khovanshchina, the Gentleman in Fra Gherardo, the Grand Inquisitor in L'Africaine, Heinrich der Vogler in Lohengrin, Il Cieco in Iris, Jacopo Fiesco in Simon Boccanegra, Lotario in Mignon, Herrmann in Tannhäuser, King Marke in Tristan und Isolde, Le Comte des Grieux in Manon, Marco Orsèolo in Orsèolo, Margherita's father in Margherita da Cortona, Mathieu in Andrea Chénier, Mefistofele in Faust, The Miller in Il re, Milone in Giuseppe Mulè's Dafni, Padre Guardiano in La forza del destino, Pagano/Hermit in I Lombardi alla prima crociata, Philipp II in Don Carlos, Simone in Gianni Schicchi, Veit Pogner in Die Meistersinger von Nürnberg, and Walter Furst in William Tell, and the title role in Boris Godunov.
