= Lo straniero =

Opera by Ildebrando Pizzetti

- Opera by Ildebrando Pizzetti
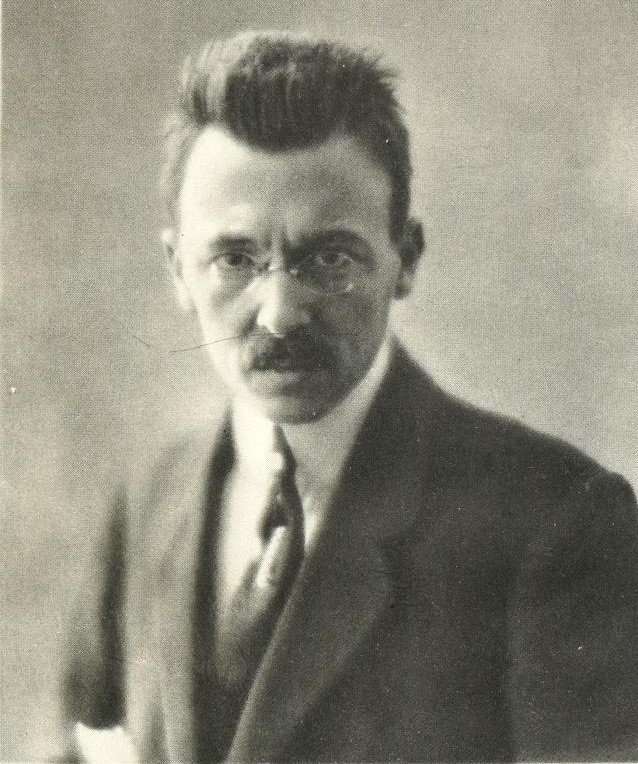
- Pizzetti in the early 1920s
- Librettist: Ildebrando Pizzetti
- Language: Italian
- Premiere: 29 April 1930; Teatro dell'Opera di Roma, Rome

Lo straniero (The Stranger) is an opera (dramma lirico) in two acts composed by Ildebrando Pizzetti, who also wrote the libretto. An original story with characters from the Old Testament, it is the third work in Pizzetti's trilogy on the themes of redemption and the virtue of love. Although it did not receive its premiere until 1930, Pizzetti had begun the project several years earlier. He began the libretto in 1922 and completed it in 1923. The composition of the music was completed in 1925. The other two works in the trilogy are Dèbora e Jaéle which premiered in 1922 and Fra Gherardo which premiered in 1928.

== Performance history ==
Lo straniero premiered on 29 April, 1930, at the Teatro dell'Opera di Roma. It was subsequently revived there in 1938 and 1955. It was also performed in 1942 at the Teatro Regio di Parma and the Teatro San Carlo in Naples.

== Roles ==
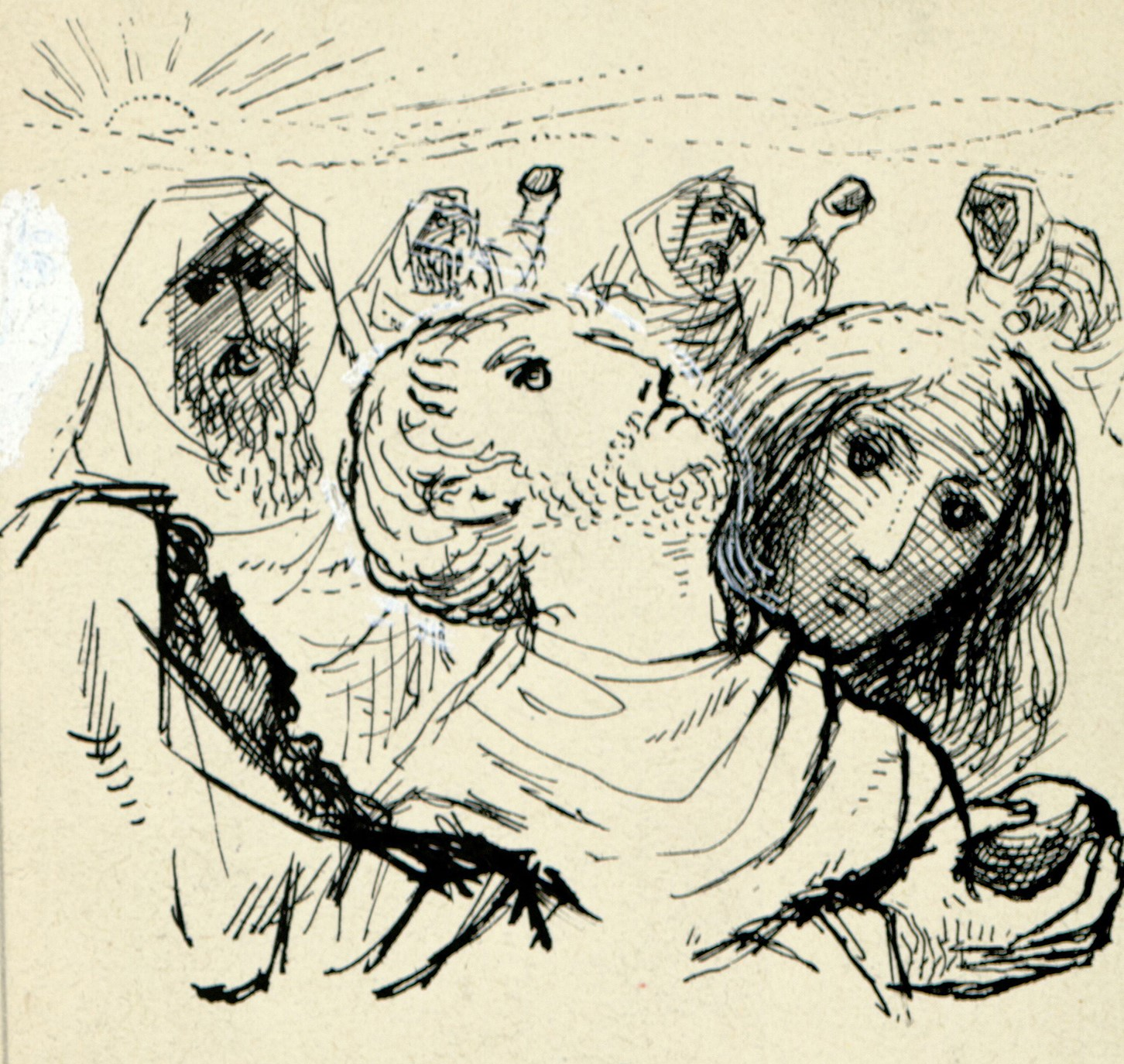
Disegno per copertina di libretto, drawing for Lo straniero (undated).

Roles, voice types, premiere cast
Role	Voice type	Premiere cast, 29 April 1930 Conductor: Gino Marinuzzi
Maria	soprano	Maria Zamboni
Lo straniero	tenor	Renato Zanelli
Falco	tenor	Luigi Nardi
Rosso	tenor	Guido Vaccari
Scedeùr	baritone	Gaetano Viviani
Old man	baritone	Amerigo Neri
King Hanóch	bass	Giacomo Vaghi
Pietra	bass	Duilio Baronti
Esaù	bass	Adolfo Pacini
