= Aldo Bertocci =

Italian singer

Aldo Bertocci

Aldo Bertocci (9 May 1915 – 1 April 2004) was an Italian operatic tenor who sang both comprimario and leading roles in a career spanning the late 1940s to the mid-1970s. He sang in the world premieres of nine 20th century operas, most of them in performances broadcast on the RAI, Italy's national public-service radio. His discography includes live recordings of several rarities such as Mascagni's Silvano and Leoncavallo's Zingari. Bertocci was born in Turin and from 1974 lived in Cassano Valcuvia where he died shortly before his 88th birthday.

== Life and career ==
Aldo Bertocci (photo with 1954 dedication)

Bertocci was born in Turin and began appearing in operas shortly after the end of World War II. In 1946 he was the tenor soloist in the world premiere in Rome of Malipiero's cantata, Vergilii Aeneis. The following year he appeared as Rinuccio in Gianni Schicchi at the Teatro Carignano in his native city. From 1949 to 1966, he sang in the world premieres of nine 20th century operas, several of them in concert performances at the RAI Auditoriums in Turin, Milan and Rome.

In 1953, he appeared at La Scala as the Sentinel in the first staged performance Pizzetti's Cagliostro, a role he had sung in its world premiere as a concert performance the previous year. He continued to perform on the main stage at La Scala and in its associated chamber theatre, Teatro della Piccola Scala, throughout his career, appearing in variety of roles including Prince Shuysky in Boris Godunov, Mefistofele in Doktor Faust, Grande inquisitore in Il prigioniero, Jack O'Brien in Rise and Fall of the City of Mahagonny, Filka Morozov in From the House of the Dead, Agrippa in The Fiery Angel, Gabriele Adorno in Simon Boccanegra, and Elézer in Mosè in Egitto (a role which he also performed in New York in a 1966 concert performance by the American Opera Society).

Bertocci sang in several other Italian opera houses, including the Teatro Lirico Giuseppe Verdi in Trieste as Bacchus in Ariadne auf Naxos and La Fenice in Venice as Uldino in Attila, Valerio in the first staged performance of Malipiero's Don Tartufo Bacchettone, and Lukà in the world premiere of Flavio Testi's L'albergo dei poveri. Although the majority of his roles were in mid-20th century works and the lyric tenor repertoire of older, but at the time, infrequently performed operas, he also assayed (to sometimes mixed reviews) the mainstream spinto tenor roles of Don José in Carmen, Des Grieux in Manon Lescaut, and the title role in Otello, the latter in a 1960 Canadian Opera Company production.

In 1974, Bertocci settled in the northern Italian town of Cassano Valcuvia and retired from the stage shortly thereafter. He lived there until his death in 2004, one week before his 88th birthday. In 2011, his adopted city organized a festival in his honour with concerts at the Teatro Comunale and an exhibit documenting his career.

== Roles created ==
- First Priest in Dallapiccola's Il prigioniero (RAI Auditorium, Turin, 1949)
- Romeo in Malipiero's Mondi celesti e infernali (RAI Auditorium, Rome, 1950)
- Achille in Pizzetti's Ifigenia (RAI Auditorium, Turin, 1950)
- Sentinel in Pizzetti's Cagliostro (RAI Auditorium, Milan, 1952)
- Mario in Mario Peragallo's La gita in campagna (La Scala, Milan, 1954)
- Abele in Felice Lattuada's Caino (La Scala, Milan, 1957)
- Herald in Pizzetti's Assassinio nella cattedrale (La Scala, Milan, 1958)
- Costruttore in Giacomo Manzoni's Atomtod (Teatro della Piccola Scala, Milan, 1965)
- Lukà in Flavio Testi's L'albergo dei poveri (La Fenice, Venice, 1966)

== Recordings ==
Many of Bertocci's performances in live radio broadcasts have been re-issued on LP and/or CD, including:

- Verdi: I Lombardi alla prima crociata (as Arvino) – Orchestra Sinfonica e Coro della Rai di Milano conducted by Manno Wolf-Ferrari, 1951 (reissued on CD by Fonit Cetra)
- Mascagni: Silvano (as Silvano) – Orchestra Sinfonica e Coro della Rai di Milano conducted by Pietro Argento, 1954 (released on LP in 1967 by E.J. Smith «The Golden Age of Opera»)
- Donizetti: Anna Bolena (as Percy) – Orchestra and Chorus of La Scala, Milan conducted by Gianandrea Gavazzeni, 1958 (reissued on CD by several labels including Myto and Opera D'oro).
- Leoncavallo: Zingari (as Radu) – Dutch Radio Symphony Orchestra and Chorus conducted by Fulvio Vernizzi, 1963 (released on LP in 1965 by E.J. Smith «The Golden Age of Opera»)
