= Maria Zamboni =

Italian operatic soprano (1895–1976)

Background information
- Born: 25 July 1895; Peschiera del Garda
- Died: 25 March 1976 (aged 80) Verona
- Genre: opera
- Instrument: soprano

Maria Zamboni (25 July 1895 – 25 March 1976) was an Italian operatic soprano who had a prolific career in Italy and South America between 1921 and 1936. Admired for her vivid character portrayals and expressive singing, Zamboni was a popular and frequent performer at both La Scala and the Teatro Costanzi. Her repertoire encompassed a broad spectrum, from Verdi and Wagner heroines to French grand opera and verismo roles. She became particularly associated with the works of Giacomo Puccini and notably sang the role of Liù in the original 1926 production of Turandot.

== Biography ==
Zamboni was born at Peschiera del Garda. She studied at the Conservatorio di Musica Arrigo Boito in Parma under Guilio Silva before making her professional opera debut in 1921 at Piacenza as Marguerite in Gounod's Faust. Over the next few years she appeared at numerous major opera houses throughout Italy, including the Teatro Regio di Torino, Teatro di San Carlo, Teatro Regio di Parma, and Teatro Comunale di Bologna among others. Her roles included Violetta in Verdi's La traviata, Desdemona in Verdi's Otello, Ännchen in Der Freischütz, the title role in Massenet's Manon, and the title role in Puccini's Tosca among others.

Zamboni became particularly associated with the Teatro Costanzi in Rome and La Scala in Milan. She sang regularly at the Teatro Costanzi from 1922–26 and 1929–30; most notably singing the role of Maria in the 1930 world premiere of Pizzetti's Lo straniero. In 1924 she joined the roster at La Scala where she sang numerous roles until 1931. Her first role with the company was as Mimi in Puccini's La bohème. Most notably, she sang the role of Liu in the original 1926 production of Puccini's Turandot under the direction of Arturo Toscanini. Her other roles at La Scala included Euridice in Gluck's Orfeo ed Euridice, Elsa in Wagner's Lohengrin, Eva in Wagner's Die Meistersinger von Nürnberg, the title part in Puccini's Manon Lescaut, and Donna Elvira in Don Giovanni.

Zamboni also had a successful career internationally. She toured South America frequently during the 1920s appearing in operas in Rio de Janeiro, Montevideo, São Paulo and Santiago. She became a particularly popular artist at the Teatro Colón in Buenos Aires where she sang annually from 1924–1926. In Europe she had a considerable amount of success in the Netherlands, singing in numerous Italian operas during the 1930s.

In 1936 Zamboni retired from the stage shortly after appearing as both Liu in Turandot and in the title role of Mario Persico’s Morenita at the Teatro San Carlo. Her last performance was on radio in a 1936 national Italian broadcast of Wagner's Die Meistersinger von Nürnberg as Eva. Following the end of her singing career, Zamboni worked as a singing teacher in Milan for more than twenty years before retiring to Verona where she died in 1976.

== Recordings ==
Zamboni was the first singer to record the role of Manon Lescaut in its entirety. On single discs, she also recorded "Vissi d'arte" from Tosca, double arias from Turandot, Otello, La traviata and Lohengrin and duets from La bohème and Carmen with the great tenor Beniamino Gigli.
