= Ifigenia (Pizzetti) =

Opera by Ildebrando Pizzetti

- Opera by Ildebrando Pizzetti
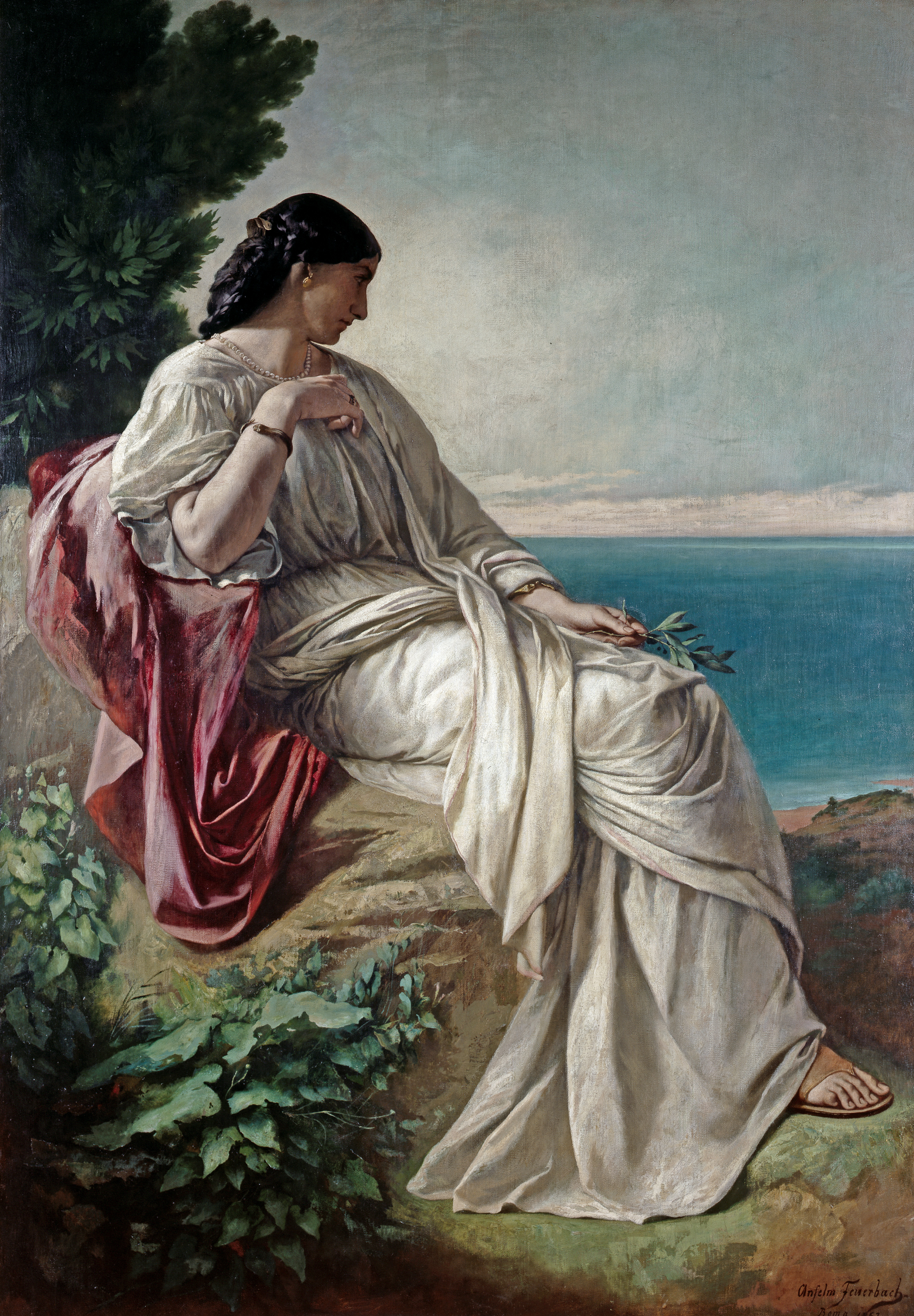
- Iphigenia (1862) by Anselm Feuerbach
- Librettist: Ildebrando Pizzetti and Alberto Perrini
- Language: Italian
- Premiere: 3 October 1950; RAI broadcast, Turin

Ifigenia is a tragic opera in one act by Ildebrando Pizzetti, who also wrote the libretto with Alberto Perrini. The libretto is in Italian language. It was premiered as a radio broadcast from RAI Auditorium in Turin on 3 October 1950. In the same year, it received the first prize of Prix Italia radio annual award, that was held in Turin. The opera made its theatrical debut at Teatro Comunale in Florence on 9 May 1951 during the 14th Maggio Musicale Fiorentino festival.

== Roles ==
Roles, voice types, premiere casts
Role	Voice type	Premiere cast	
Role	Voice type	Radio broadcast, 3 October 1950 Conductor: Fernando Previtali	Staged, 9 May 1951 Conductor: Ildebrando Pizzetti
Ifigenia (Iphigenia), daughter of Agamennone and Clitennestra	soprano	Rosanna Carteri	Rosanna Carteri
Clitennestra (Clytemnestra), the Queen, Agamennone’s wife	mezzo-soprano	Elena Nicolai	Elena Nicolai
Achille (Achilles), Greek hero of the Trojan war	tenor	Aldo Bertocci	Antonio Annaloro
Agamennone (Agamemnon), the King, Clitennestra’s husband	bass	Giacomo Vaghi	Giacomo Vaghi

== Synopsis ==
The background is presented by a narrator: the gods were angry with the Greeks, have imposed King Agamennone to sacrifice his daughter, Ifigenia, as a condition for his fleet to gain fair winds for the Greek ships bound for Troy. Ifigenia and her mother, Clitennestra were invited by Agamennone, believing that they were preparing for marriage ceremony between her and Achille. Upon arrival, Achille unveiled the truth to them, showing firmness towards the divine will.

The king is relentless, beyond the wrath of the gods, he also fears the rebellion of the soldiers impatient to set sail. He calls upon Ifigenia and urges her to face the terrible trial with courage. The girl accepted her fate and surrender to the altar of sacrifice.

In the epilogue, when the mist descending to hide the sacrificial act is thinned out, a mysterious voice rises to ask why the eternal perpetuation of the war. But there was no answer, and the same voice, after the intervention of the choir, which symbolically multiplies the painful question in several languages "Why? Pourquoi? Por qué? Warum? Why? Quare?", and chanting the prayer in Latin "Si iniquitates observaveris, Domine, quis substinevit?, irascaris, Domine. Dona nobis pacem" for all the victims and perpetrators.

== Recordings ==
Year	Cast: Ifigenia, Clitennestra, Achille, Agamennone	Conductor, Opera house, orchestra	Label
1960	Rosanna Carteri, Fiorenza Cossotto, Ottorino Begali, Nicola Rossi-Lemeni	Nino Sanzogno, Teatro la Fenice Orchestra and Chorus, Venice	House of Opera; SN: CD8400
