= Renato Zanelli =

Italian-Chilean opera singer (1892–1935)

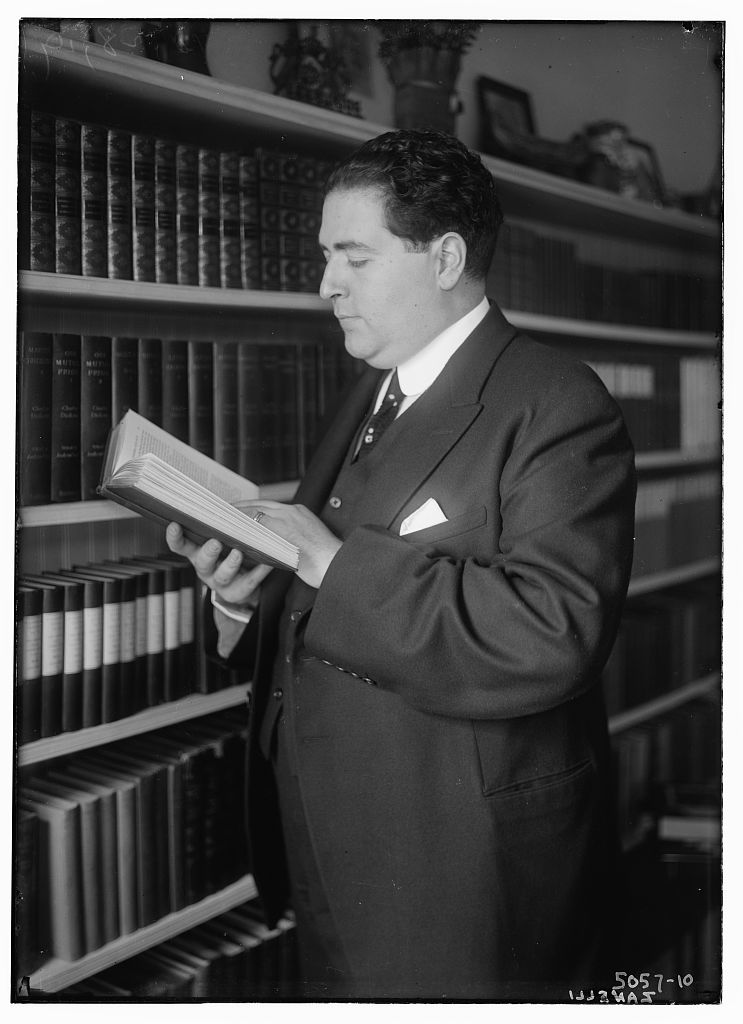
- Zanelli circa 1915
- Born: Renato Zanelli Morales; April 1, 1892; Almendral, Los Andes, Valparaíso, Chile
- Died: March 25, 1935 (aged 42); Santiago, Chile

Renato Zanelli (April 1, 1892 – March 25, 1935) was an Italian-Chilean operatic baritone and later tenor, particularly associated with heroic Italian and German roles, notably Verdi's Otello.

== Biography ==
Renato Zanelli, nom d'art of Renato Zanelli Morales, was born in Valparaíso, Chile on April 1, 1892. His father was Italian and his mother Chilean. In 1894 he was taken to Europe and was educated in Switzerland and Italy. He returned to Chile in 1911 to work in his father's salpeter factory office in Valparaíso. His voice was discovered at a social party by Angelo Querzé, an Italian tenor who had sung in Chile in 1894 in the local premiere of "Otello".

He studied in Santiago with Angelo Querze, making his debut there as a baritone in 1916, as Valentin. He later sang such important baritone roles as Tonio, de Luna, and Renato.

His Metropolitan Opera debut came in 1919, as Amonasro. He remained there until 1923, singing most of the major Italian baritone parts.

Zanelli then left for Italy for further studies with Dante Lari and Fernando Tanara in Milan. His first appearance as a tenor occurred in 1924 at the Teatro San Carlo in Naples, as Raoul. He went on to sing widely in Italy and South America in roles as diverse as Pollione, Don José, Andrea Chénier, Canio, Tristan and Siegmund.

He sang his first Otello in Turin in 1926, which also was his debut role at the Royal Opera House in London. His portrayal of Otello was notable for the intensity of its dramatic utterance. He took part in the first performance, in 1930, of Pizzetti's Lo straniero at Teatro dell'Opera di Roma.

Zanelli had a rich voice and was equally successful as a baritone and a tenor, his early death from cancer cutting short a brilliant career. His artistry is preserved, however, on a number of recordings of operatic arias which he made at the height of his powers in the two vocal categories that he had mastered. These recordings are available on CD.

His brother, Carlos Zanelli-Morales (1897–1970), was also a successful baritone. He sang under the stage name of Carlo Morelli in Italy and also at the Met from 1935 to 1940.

Zanelli died on March 25, 1935, in Santiago, Chile after fighting cancer.

== Sources ==
- Le guide de l'opéra, les indispensables de la musique, R. Mancini & J-J. Rouvereux, (Fayard, 1986), ISBN 2-213-01563-5
