= Elvira Casazza =

Italian opera singer

Elvira Casazza as Dèbora in Pizzetti's Dèbora e Jaéle

Elvira Casazza (15 November 1887 – 24 January 1965) (also known as Elvira Mari-Casazza), was an Italian operatic mezzo-soprano. One of Toscanini's favourite singers, she was considered an outstanding interpreter of Mistress Quickly in Verdi's Falstaff during the 1920s and created several roles in Italian operas of the early 20th century.

== Biography ==
Casazza was born Elivra Mari in Ferrara and studied in Milan with Adele Borghi before making her operatic debut as Azucena in Il trovatore in Sanremo in 1910. During the course of her stage career, she sang throughout Italy as well as in Latin America and Spain. Amongst the roles she created were Dèbora in Pizzetti's Dèbora e Jaéle (1922) and the Commandant in Zandonai's I cavalieri di Ekebù (1925). Known for the extension of her lower register with an almost baritonal quality to her low notes, she has been described as a contralto in some sources.

She was married to Umberto Casazza, a violinist from Busseto and a distant relative of the conductor, Giulio Gatti-Casazza. The couple had one son, Girolamo, who was killed in a plane crash at the outset of World War II. Following the death of her husband a few years later, Casazza retired from the stage with a final performance at the Teatro Verdi in Trieste in 1947 as Mother in Charpentier's Louise. She devoted her later years to teaching singing at the Rossini Conservatory in Pesaro and then at the Accademia di Santa Cecilia in Rome. Elvira Mari-Casazza died in Milan at the age of 80.

== Sources ==
- Gatti, Guido M., "Casazza-Mari, Elivra", La Musica, Unione tipografico-editrice torinese, 1971, p. 362.
- Lasagni, Roberto (ed.), "Mari, Elvira", Dizionario dei parmigiani (online version), Istituzione Biblioteche del Comune di Parma, 1999.
- Stinchelli, Enrico, Le stelle della lirica: i grandi cantanti della storia dell'opera, Gremese Editore, 2002. ISBN 88-8440-192-5
- Rosenthal, H. and Warrack, J., "Casazza, Elvira", The Concise Oxford Dictionary of Opera, 2nd Edition, Oxford University Press, 1979, p. 85. ISBN 0-19-311321-X
