= Gloria (Poulenc) =

Musical setting composed by Francis Poulenc

- Choral music by Francis Poulenc
- Catalogue: FP 177
- Language: Latin
- Based on: Gloria
- Composed: 1959
- Performed: 21 January 1961
- Scoring: soprano solo; mixed choir; orchestra

The Gloria by Francis Poulenc, FP 177, scored for soprano solo, large orchestra, and chorus, is a setting of the Gloria text from the mass ordinary. One of Poulenc's most celebrated works, it was commissioned by the Koussevitsky Foundation in honor of Sergei Koussevitzky and his wife Natalia, the namesakes of the foundation.

== Background ==
Poulenc would later claim that the idea for the Gloria began while he worked on his opera, Dialogues des Carmélites, although it has been impossible to establish the dating of his initial sketches with certainty. He also said that the “Laudamus te” had been inspired by the sight of Benedictine monks playing soccer. On April 18, 1959, the composer wrote to Bernard Gavoty that he was “back at work” and had “just begun a Gloria for chorus, soloist, and orchestra in the Vivaldi style.”

Despite being commissioned by the Koussevitzky Foundation, the composition of Poulenc's Gloria was not a direct result of their involvement. In spring 1959, the organization had requested a symphony from the composer, who replied that the genre was “not my thing.” They followed this up with a suggestion for an organ concerto, which Poulenc brushed off by telling them he had already composed one. On July 7 the organization replied that their advisory board had approved a $2,000 commission (approximately $18,000 in 2020) for a work of the composer's own choosing. On August 3, Poulenc replied that he had already initiated work on his Gloria. The score was completed July 1960.

== Movements ==
The work is divided into six movements as follows:

1. Gloria in excelsis Deo (G major)
2. Laudamus te (C major)
3. Domine Deus, Rex caelestis (B minor)
4. Domine Fili unigenite (G major)
5. Domine Deus, Agnus Dei (B♭ minor)
6. Qui sedes ad dexteram Patris (G major)

== Description ==
The first movement opens with a great chordal motif from the brass instruments that very closely resembles the opening of Igor Stravinsky's Serenade in A for Piano (1925). The chorus then enters singing in an accented and declamatory manner. The introduction begins in G major and modulates to a G minor chord, after which the woodwinds enter in parallel 4ths and 7ths. The chorus enters in double-dotted rhythms, reminiscent of the brass fanfare, in the key of B minor, accompanied by B minor triads over a pedal G in the bass. This juxtaposition of G major and B minor is an important one that returns throughout the piece.

The second movement is the most jocund, opening with a strange, quick brass introduction. A light tune repeats throughout this movement along with an often-changing time signature. This movement is in the key of C, with a few diversions throughout. The last line of the text, beginning "Gratias agimus..." is in a somber chromaticized mode, giving an other-worldly characteristic in the middle of the revelry of the movement. After this respite, there is a diversion to E♭ over an "oompah" bass figure. The accentuation of the text in this movement has been referred to as "perverse", due to its un-speechlike patterns.

The third movement is led by the extremely dramatic solo soprano line after a woodwind introduction. The movement ends with a picardy third, preparing the way for the more joyful fourth movement.

The fourth movement is the shortest and resembles the second movement in the jocular nature of the orchestral phrases, but contains some of the accented nature of the first movement in the chorus parts. The melodic lines are often pentatonic, and the quick tempo and rousing rhythms give a whirling and dancing impression, grounded by the constant return of the theme.

The fifth movement opens with woodwinds and resembles the third movement with the return of the soprano soloist as leader. The music is dark and mysterious, due in part to the inclusion of both an augmented fourth and an augmented fifth in the soprano's opening melodic line. The movement culminates in an E♭ minor chord, a fifth lower than the beginning B♭ minor, giving an uneasy, mysterious feeling to the end. Of particular note is the similarity between the clarinet solos of this movement and parts of the first and second movements of Poulenc's later clarinet sonata.

The sixth movement begins with alternating a cappella chorus and interjections of the orchestra intoning the fanfare theme from the first movement. After the introduction, the main setting of the text is reminiscent of the first movement, with the sixteenth note toiling line in the upper strings above a walking bass. The final section is preceded by a solo "Amen" from the soprano, echoed by the chorus. The chorus proceeds to repeat the text, this time over a mixture of B minor and G major chords in the orchestra. The fanfare theme from the first movement returns one final time before the final "amen", triumphantly slower and grander. The final "Amen" intoned by the soprano on a D relates to both the B minor and G major chords played simultaneously to end the piece.

== Reception ==
Gloria was premiered on January 21, 1961, in Boston, Massachusetts, by the Boston Symphony Orchestra and the Chorus pro Musica under conductor Charles Münch with Adele Addison as soloist. Poulenc, who was in attendance, reported to Pierre Bernac that the premiere was “very good, very fine, a success,” but that he preferred Münch's “sublime” final rehearsal over the concert.

Georges Prêtre, soloist Rosanna Carteri, and choirs prepared by Yvonne Gouverné debuted the Gloria in France on February 14, with the same forces subsequently making the premiere recording under the supervision of the composer. Among later recordings of the music, the RCA Victor recording by the Robert Shaw Chorale in 1965 won a Grammy Award for the "Best Choral Performance."

== Bibliography ==
- Schmidt, Carl B. (1995). The Music of Francis Poulenc (1899–1963): A Catalogue. Oxford: Clarendon Press. ISBN 978-0-19-816336-7.
