= L'oro =

Opera by Ildebrando Pizzetti

- Opera by Ildebrando Pizzetti
- Librettist: Ildebrando Pizzetti
- Language: Italian
- Premiere: 2 January 1947; La Scala, Milan

L’oro (Italian for "Gold") is an opera in three acts composed by Ildebrando Pizzetti who also wrote the libretto in Italian language. It premiered at La Scala in Milan on 2 January 1947, conducted by Pizzeti himself.

Pizzetti wrote the whole story play for this opera, moving away from adaptation taken from mythological, historical and biblical inspiration as displayed in his previous works. This opera is a social drama. He dedicates himself to the composition of this opera completely of his own invention, set in a fantastic place without a precise temporal collocation. The center of attention in the story play is the conflict provoked by the thirst for power and the greed for wealth. L’oro is said to be the new revolution in Pizzetti's theatrical production.

== Roles ==
Role	Voice type	Premiere cast, 2 January 1947 (Conductor: Ildebrando Pizzetti)
Giovanni de 'Neri, head of the community of Carpineta and rich landowner	tenor	Antonio Annaloro
Cristina, Giovanni's wife	soprano	Mercedes Fortunati
Their little dumb son	Not singing	
Grandfather Innocenzo	bass	Cesare Siepi
Martino, Giovanni's servant	baritone or bass	Eraldo Coda
Lazzaro	bass	Italo Tajo
Giovanni's mother, the doctor, the bald, municipal councilors, two friends, young men and woman, farmers, children

== Synopsis ==
The story takes place at a place called Carpineta, in an imprecise period.

=== Act 1 ===
Giovanni is married to a foreign woman, Cristina, from whom he had only one dumb son. She feels oppressed by the sad omen and have been asking Giovanni to leave the place and move someplace else.

In one afternoon, near the Fontovina field

Town councilors and farmers meet up to discuss the new systems adopted by Giovanni in his farm. Giovanni intends to modernize the life of Carpineta’s people, realizing that industries and canals are the current innovation, and population wealth is no longer depending on agriculture only. The ideas do not sit well with the farmers. When the discussion gets overheated, Giovanni tries to calm them down, claiming that he has acted in the interest of everyone. The meeting discussion changes when Martino, Giorvanni’s servant arrives, telling them about the gold discovery at Pian dei Cerri. The farmers were excited with the idea of easy rich, and now wish to dedicate themselves to the search for gold.

=== Act 2 ===
At Pian dei Cerri

The gold diggers have camped near the site, but their search for gold continues to give unsuccessful results. Giovanni actually has found the gold in a larger cave. To gain access to the cave, they would have to blow up a part of the mountain. Giovanni is afraid to reveal his discovery, fearing the greed among fellow people of Carpineta. The people, however, begin to suspect Giovanni is hiding a secret from them because he wants to keep the riches for himself. Concerned by his attitude, Cristina persuades the husband to share about the discovery to the people, but he refuses. After speaking to him, she goes to the cave quietly and blows herself up, thus preventing everyone from accessing the gold.

=== Act 3 ===
At the field of Fontovina

Giovanni is devastated for the loss of his wife. The people of Carpineta has now decided to abandon their dreams of gold-rich scheme and to continue working at the farm again, adapting the innovations introduced by Giovanni. While discussing, suddenly Cristina appears. She was heavily wounded. The explosion had thrown her out of the cave. At that time and for the first time, her son utters his first word, calling her "Mother!". In her dying breath, she asks Giovanni not to abandon the work at the farm with the people of Carpineta. Cristina finally dies serene, because her sacrifice has allowed the return of harmony among the people of her land.
