= Alex Esposito =

Italian bass-baritone opera singer

Alex Esposito is an Italian bass-baritone opera singer, best known for singing Mozart roles, especially Leporello in Don Giovanni.

Esposito was born in Bergamo. He debuted at the Royal Opera in 2007 as Alidoro in La Cenerentola and sang Leporello in the 2008/09 and 2013/14 seasons, when he will also sing Figaro in Le nozze di Figaro.

== Repertoire ==
Operatic repertoire
Role	Title	Composer
Lorenzo	I Capuleti e i Montecchi	Bellini
Pére Laurence	Roméo et Juliette	Berlioz
Méphistophélès	La damnation de Faust	Berlioz
Bottom	A Midsummer Night's Dream	Britten
Enrico VIII	Anna Bolena	Donizetti
Dottor Dulcamara	L'elisir d'amore	Donizetti
Alfonso d'Este	Lucrezia Borgia	Donizetti
Méphistophélès	Faust	Gounod
Argante	Rinaldo	Handel
Idreno	Armida	Haydn
Simone	La finta semplice	Mozart
Figaro; Conte d'Almaviva	Le nozze di Figaro	Mozart
Don Giovanni; Leporello	Don Giovanni	Mozart
Guglielmo	Così fan tutte	Mozart
Papageno	Die Zauberflöte	Mozart
Publio	La clemenza di Tito	Mozart
Lindorf; Coppélius; Miracle; Dapertutto	Les contes d'Hoffmann	Offenbach
Canizzares	Il cordovano	Petrassi
Custode	Morte dell'aria	Petrassi
Colline	La Bohème	Puccini
Orbazzano	Tancredi	Rossini
Mustafà	L'Italiana in Algeri	Rossini
Selim	Il turco in Italia	Rossini
Don Basilio	Il barbiere di Siviglia	Rossini
Alidoro	La Cenerentola	Rossini
Fernando Villabella	La gazza ladra	Rossini
Mosè; Faraone	Mosè in Egitto	Rossini
Polidoro	Zelmira	Rossini
Assur	Semiramide	Rossini
Lord Sidney; Don Profondo	Il viaggio a Reims	Rossini
Mahomet II	Le siège de Corinthe	Rossini
Moïse; Pharaon	Moïse et Pharaon	Rossini
Nonancourt	Il cappello di paglia di Firenze	Rota
Creon	Oedipus rex	Stravinsky
Nick Shadow	The Rake's Progress	Stravinsky
Arlecchino	La vedova scaltra	Wolf-Ferrari
