= Zingari =

Opera by Ruggero Leoncavallo

- Opera by Ruggero Leoncavallo
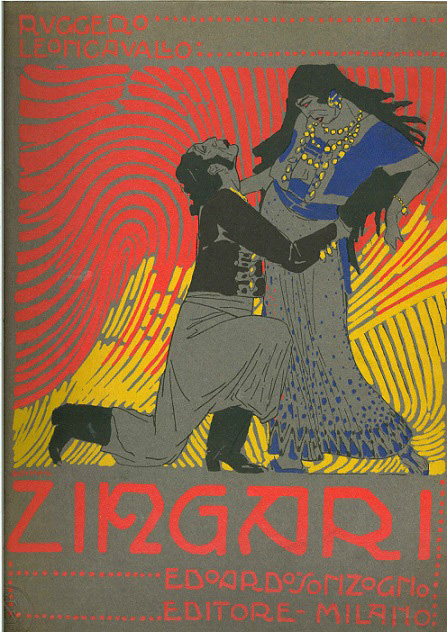
- Aroldo Bonzagni; Cover of the piano/vocal score published by Sonzogno, 1912
- Librettist: Enrico Cavacchioli; Guglielmo Emanuel
- Premiere: 16 September 1912; Hippodrome Theater, London

Zingari (Gypsies), also known as Gli Zingari, is an opera in two acts by Ruggero Leoncavallo. The libretto by Enrico Cavacchioli and Guglielmo Emanuel is based on The Gypsies, an 1827 narrative poem by Alexander Pushkin. The opera premiered on 16 September 1912 at the Hippodrome Theatre in London. The United States premiere of the opera was staged by the Chicago Grand Opera Company in 1913 with soprano Carolina White as Fleana.

Despite the opera's present obscurity, its incredibly long run in London in 1912/3 and performances in the United States in 1913 make it Leoncavallo's most performed opera after Pagliacci, surpassing the performances of his more widely known Zazà and La bohème. Although Edigio Cunego, who created the role of Radu and appeared in hundreds of performances of Zingari in London (sometimes twice a day), recorded much from Leoncavallo's operas, he did not record any excerpts from Zingari.

== Roles ==
Role	Voice type	Premiere cast, 16 September 1912 (Conductor: Ruggero Leoncavallo)
Fleana, a young Gypsy woman	soprano	Rinalda Pavoni
Radu, a young nobleman	tenor	Egidio Cunego
Old man, chief of the Gypsy tribe	baritone	Armando Santolini
Tamar, a Gypsy poet	baritone	Ernesto Caronna
Chorus of Gypsies

== Synopsis ==
Place: The lands along the lower Danube River

Time: Early 1900s

Act 1

Setting: A Gypsy encampment on the shore of the river

Fleana, a beautiful Gypsy, has been seen stealing out of the camp at night. Several members of the band follow her and discover that she is meeting a stranger. He is Radu, a young nobleman. The lovers are taken captive. Radu swears an oath that if he is allowed to marry Fleana, he will join the band and never again have dealings with his own people. The couple are pardoned, but the poet, Tamar, protests violently and declares his own love for Fleana. He is rebuked by Fleana and challenged to a fight by Radu but vanishes from the camp. As Fleana and Radu's wedding is being celebrated, Tamar sings a mournful song in the distance.

Act 2

Setting: A Gypsy encampment at an abandoned church on the plains near the river

A year has passed. Radu notices that Fleana has become increasingly cold to him. He hears her singing a wild love song in her caravan and he realizes that she must be in love with someone else. When he confronts her, she confesses that her love for him is dead and continues to sing her song ever more wildly. She then runs away, despite Radu's attempts to stop her, and goes to meet Tamar whose jubilant song is heard in the distance. They passionately declare their love for each other and disappear into a nearby hut made from straw and wood. Outside, Radu is in despair and vowing revenge. He steals up to the hut, bolts the door from the outside and sets it on fire. Tamar and Fleana perish in the flames.

== Recordings ==
There have been four full-length recordings of the opera, all from live performances:

- Fulvio Vernizzi conducting the Dutch Radio Symphony Orchestra and Chorus, with Edy Amedeo as Fleana and Aldo Bertocci as Radu (recorded live November 1963).
- Elio Boncompagni conducting the RAI Symphony Orchestra and Chorus of Turin, with Gianna Galli as Fleana and Aldo Bottion as Radu (recorded live 7 April 1975).
- Giovan Battista Varoli conducting the Orchestra Regina and Coro Harmonia Cantata, with Marina Fratarcangeli as Fleana and Andrea Elena as Radu (recorded live 13 September 1999). Label: Kicco Classic CD 054
- Daniele Agiman conducting the Orchestra Filarmonica Italiana with Denia Mazzola Gavazzeni as Fleana and Giuseppe Veneziano as Radu (recorded live 4 November 2019. Label: Bongiovanni GB 2585-2.
- Carlo Rizzi conducting the Royal Philharmonic Orchestra with Krassimira Stoyanova as Fleana and Arsen Soghomonyan as Radu (studio recording, 2022. Label: Opera Rara ORCO 61).
