= La vedova scaltra =

Opera by Ermanno Wolf-Ferrari

- Opera by Ermanno Wolf-Ferrari
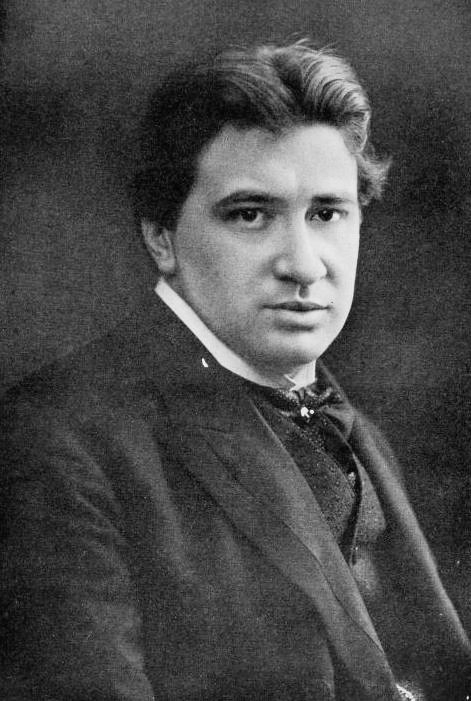
- The composer in 1906
- Translation: The Cunning Widow
- Librettist: Mario Ghisalberti
- Language: Italian
- Based on: La vedova scaltra by Carlo Goldoni
- Premiere: 5 March 1931; Teatro Reale dell'Opera, Rome

La vedova scaltra (English: The Cunning Widow) is an updated opera-buffa in three acts by Ermanno Wolf-Ferrari to a text by Mario Ghisalberti, after Carlo Goldoni's original play (also called La vedova scaltra) first given in 1748.

== Performance history ==
It was first performed at the Teatro Reale dell'Opera in Rome on 5 March 1931, Director Gino Marinuzzi and opera director Marcello Govoni. It was revived in Venice, in celebration of the 300th anniversary of the birth of Carlo Goldoni, in February 2007. This performance, with Anne-Lise Sollied, Maurizo Muraro and Emanuele D'Aguanno as the main soloists, has been recorded (see below).

== Roles ==
Role	Voice type	Premiere Cast, 5 March 1931 (Conductor: Gino Marinuzzi)
Rosaura, a widow	soprano	Adelaide Saraceni
Monsieur Le Beau, a Frenchman	tenor	Alessio De Paolis
Conte di Bosco Nero, an Italian	tenor	Alessandro Ziliani
Milord Runebif, an Englishman	baritone	Giulio Cirino
Don Alvaro di Castiglia, a Spaniard	baritone	Giacomo Vaghi
Marionette	soprano	Rina De Ferrari
Folletto	tenor	Adelio Zagonara
Arlecchino	baritone	Emilio Ghirardini
Birif	bass	Mario Bianchi
Majordomo	bass	Pierantonio Prodi

== Synopsis ==
The story is a comedy about a young widow courted by four suitors of different nationalities.

Act I

Four noblemen, Monsieur Le Bleau, Don Alvaro di Castiglia, Milord Runebif and Il Conte di Bosco Nero are seated around a table of a café in the town square, enjoying a glass of wine. Talk turns to the vivacious and rich widow they had met at a ball in Venice. Each of them believes they are the right man to win her hand in marriage. Milord’s opening gambit is to send Arlecchino, who works at the inn, to the widow’s apartment with the gift of a ring and a generous offer – he will deign to stop by and drink hot chocolate with her. Arlecchino arrives just as the widow Rosaura, whose flirty maid Marionette has been offering her tips on make-up and the advantages of a French husband, finishes her dressing. Rasaura rejects Milord’s ring and Milord is immediately at her door, begging her to accept his gift. Marionette is serving hot chocolate when the Count arrives; Marionette distracts Milord by leading him off to another room to view some etchings, allowing the Count enough time to declare his love for Rosaura, but the Count shows his jealousy on finding the Englishman is already in her apartment – jealousy that Rosaura finds rather tiresome! Both men take their leave but not before Milord has arranged another meeting with her, making the Count even more furious. No Monsieur Le Bleau arrives and finding Marionette alone the pair reminisce about the pleasures of Paris, before Le Bleau remembers his mission and asks where he will find Rosaura. Pointed to the gardens beside a lake, Le Bleau hides in the shrubbery and begins his seduction by playing the flute; having attracted her attention he flatters her beauty and her style before floridly declaring his love for her. She turns him down and he leaves, but as soon as he is gone she is again disturbed, this time by the sound of guitars and mandolins, as Don Alvaro crosses the lake toward her, in a gondola. This day really is shaping up to be a tiresome one for the widow, and she asks Marionette to meet him and tell him to wait – she has had quite enough of suitors for a day.

Act II

In the same café as opened Act I, Le Bleau accosts Arlecchino, giving him a portrait and a poem he has written and asking him to deliver the portrait and recite the poem to Rosaura. The Count now arrives, and presses a letter for Rosaura into the hands of his manservant Folletto. Milord hands his manservant Birif diamonds, also destined for Rosaura. Arlecchino is trying to understand the poem he has been given to read to Rosaura when he is interrupted by Don Alvaro who tells Arlecchino to take Rosaura a document demonstrating his impressive genealogy. Arlecchino, arrives at Rosaura’s house in the disguise of a French valet as she is singing an antique air. Just behind him are Folletto and Birif, and the three of them present Rosaura with Le Bleau’s portrait, the Count’s passionate love-letter and Runebif’s diamonds. Arlecchino, following a quick change into the clothes of a Spanish valet reappears with Don Alvaro’s family tree. Amused by all the attention, Rosaura tells Marionette that each of the men seem suitable so, spoilt for choice, she can afford to take her time. Back at the café, each of the men receive via their lackeys, signs of encouragement from Rosaura, though Arlecchino mistakenly mixes up the letters for Don Alvaro and Le Bleau. Stiffed by Don Alvaro and by Le Bleau with no trinket for his efforts Arlecchino vows he will have vengeance on the miserly Spaniard and the self-centred Frenchman but not before Marionette who thinks Arlecchino has made a tidy sum serving these nobles and wants a cut, chases him out of the square.

Act III

A glimpse of Rosaura’s dressing room is visible, including a table at which Rosaura is writing the last of many letters of invitation to a ball: she explains to Marionette who is sealing the envelopes that before the ball she will meet each of the men, disguised in a costume appropriate to the country each suitor hails from; she will flirt with each, to test their fidelity. Back at the café on the square Don Alvaro and Le Bleau are reading the letters from Rosaura that Arlecchino had mixed up the previous day. Arlecchino, still angry that neither man paid for his service walks up to the table and, saying “with your permission, gentlemen” takes the two letters and gives each to its correct recipient before bowing and retreating. The two noblemen now realise they are rivals for Rosaura and challenge each other to a duel but while Don Alvaro marches off, sword drawn, Le Bleau stays behind, distracted by a gaggle of pretty maids one of whom he follows out of the square. Now Milord and the Count appear on the terrace of the café – swords already drawn for they know they are rivals. Milord wounds the Count who withdraws and Milord sits at a table. Rosaura in disguise now meets each man in turn, insinuating that she will be their lover that evening and demanding a token of affection from each. Milord, Don Alvaro, Le Bleau all indicate that they are very interested in the proposal. Only the wounded Count resists the masked woman’s advances. We are now at the ball. An entertainment featuring Arcadian shepherds and nymphs is underway when Rosaura stops the festivities with an announcement – “Choosing a husband is a serious matter” she says. Then, pointing to the four men she reveals the duplicity of Milord, Le Bleau and Don Alvaro, returning publicly to each, the token they had given her, before declaring she will marry The Count. When The Count boasts that he has won her heart because he is faultless she corrects him - "You may not be faultless but you are a compatriot which is a very important thing and besides, who can command one's heart?" Arlecchino has the final say – addressing the audience he declares that "this opera is faultless, the love of Goldoni is a very important thing and nobody can command the heart."

== Recordings ==
- Wolf-Ferrari: La vedova scaltra: Anne-Lise Sollied (Rosaura), Henriette Bonde-Hansen (Marionette), Franck Leguérinel (Runebif), Giorgio Trucco (Le Bleau), Francesco Piccoli (Bosco Nero), Jonathan Veira (Castiglia), Evgueniy Alexiev (Arlecchino), Gilles Hubert (Birif), Nicolas Todorovich (Folletto), Olivier Thierry (a servant) - Orchestre National de Montpellier, Enrique Mazzola. Recording date: April 2004. Label: Euterp Accord Universal France (CD)
- Wolf-Ferrari: La vedova scaltra: Anne-Lise Sollied (Rosaura), Elena Rossi (Marionette), Maurizio Muraro (Runebif), Emanuele D'Aguanno (Le Bleau), Mark Milhofer (Bosco Nero), Riccardo Zanellato (Castiglia), Alex Esposito (Arlecchino), Claudio Zancopé (Birif), Luca Favaron (Folletto), Antonio Casagrande (a servant) - Teatro La Fenice Orchestra. Conductor: Karl Martin Director: Massimo Gasparon. Recording date: 1 September 2008. Label: Naxos - (CD and DVD)
