= The Gypsies (poem) =

1827 poem by Alexander Pushkin

- Author: Alexander Pushkin
- Original title: Цыганы
- Language: Russian
- Genre: Narrative poem, Romanticism
- Publication date: 1827
- Publication place: Russia

The Gypsies (Russian: Цыга́ны, romanized: Tsygany) is a narrative poem in 569 lines by Alexander Pushkin, originally written in Russian in 1824 and first fully published in 1827. The last of Pushkin's four 'Southern Poems' written during his exile in the south of the Russian Empire, The Gypsies is also considered to be the most mature of these Southern poems, and has been praised for originality and its engagement with psychological and moral issues. The poem has inspired at least eighteen operas and several ballets.

== Outline ==
The poem opens with an establishment of the setting in Bessarabia and a colorful, lively description of the activities of a gypsy camp there:

Между колесами телег,
Полузавешанных коврами,
Горит огонь; семья кругом
Готовит ужин; в чистом поле
Пасутся кони; за шатром
Ручной медведь лежит на воле.

— ll.7–12
Translation:

Between the wheels of the carriages
half-covered by hanging carpets
burns a flame, and the family around it
cooks supper; in the clear field
the horses are at pasture; beyond the tent
a tame bear lies uncaged.

The poem is written almost exclusively in iambic tetrameter, and this regular metre is established from the outset:

 × /  × /     ×  /    × /
Горит огонь; семья  кругом
Gorít ogón'; sem'yá krugóm
 × / ×  / ×       /  ×   / ×
Готовит ужин  в  чистом поле (ll.9–10)
Gotóvit úzhin v chístom póle

(Burns a flame, and the family around it / Cook their supper; in the fresh field.)

Once the scene is set, the characters are introduced: an old man is waiting for his daughter Zemfira to return home while his dinner grows cold. When she arrives, she announces that she has brought home with her a man, Aleko, who has fled the city because the law is pursuing him.

At this point the narrative style changes: the omniscient narrator steps aside and the majority of the rest of the poem takes the form of a dialogue, following the tradition of closet drama. The Old Man and Zemfira welcome Aleko, but he retains lingering doubts about the possibility of happiness at the Gypsy camp:

Уныло юноша глядел,
На опустелую равнину
И грусти тайную причину
Истолковать себе не смел.

— ll.94–98
Translation:

The youth looked around him in despair
at the emptied plain
and the secret reason for his sadness
he did not dare to seek to discover.

Aleko is established as a Romantic hero: the narrator describes him as a tormented victim of passion and sounds an ominous note that his passions will return.

Но боже! как играли страсти
Его послушною душой
С каким волнением кипели
В его измученной груди
Давно ль, на долго ль усмирели?
Они проснутся: погоди!

— l.140–145
Translation:

But God! How did passions play
With his obedient soul
With what excitement did they boiled up
In his tormented chest
How long ago they calmed down, how long would they be at peace?
They will awake: just wait!

Zemfira asks Aleko if he misses the splendor of his homeland, but he responds that his only desire is to spend his life with her in voluntary exile. (ll.174–176). The Old Man warns that although Aleko loves the Gypsy life, this feeling may not last forever, and tells a story of a man that he knew who spent his entire life with the Gypsies but who eventually pined for his homeland and asked to be buried there. (ll.181–216). This is thought to be a reference to the Roman poet Ovid, who was banished to Tomis in 8 AD.

Two years pass (l.225) and Aleko remains with Zemfira in the Gypsy camp. However, Zemfira begins to sing a love song about an adulterous affair which shocks and scares Aleko (ll.259–266). At this point the poem switches from iambic tetrameter and is less consistent with fewer feet.

The Old Man warns Aleko that he has heard this song before from his wife Mariula who later left him. Aleko is upset by the song and falls asleep, and Zemfira is angry when she hears him pronounce another woman's name in his sleep (l.327). The Old Man warns Aleko not to expect Zemfira to be faithful (ll.287–299), and tells him in detail about how Mariula left him after only a year (ll.370–409). Aleko, however, insists on his "rights" (l.419), or at least the possibility of getting the pleasure of revenge (l.420).

Zemfira meets her lover at night and, just as they are parting, Aleko catches them together. In a scene of extremely fast-moving dialogue, he kills them both. The Old Man tells him to leave the Gypsies because his understanding of law, freedom and order is different from his (ll.510–520):

Оставь нас, гордый человек!
Мы дики; нет у нас законов,
Мы не терзаем, не казним –
Не нужно крови нам и стонов –
Но жить с убийцей не хотим...
Ты не рожден для дикой доли,
Ты для себя лишь хочешь воли.

— ll.510–516
Translation:

Leave us, proud man!
We are wild; we have no laws
We do not torture or execute –
We have no need of blood or moans –
But we don't want to live with a murderer...
You are not born for the savage life
You want freedom only for yourself.

The poem closes with an epilogue narrated in the first person, who warns that the gypsy encampments offer no freedom from the "fateful passions" and problems of life.

В пустынях не спаслись от бед,
И всюду страсти роковые,
И от судеб защиты нет.

— ll.566–ll.569
Translation:

In the deserts you won't be saved from misfortunes,
And fateful passions are found everywhere
And there is no defence against the fates.

== Analysis ==
The poem addresses and interrogates the concept of the noble savage, an idea which had gained popular currency in the Romantic Age which held that those people who live further from "civilization" live "in harmony with nature and a more simple, childlike and blessed life" than the alienated and unhappy people in European cities. Aleko's failure to integrate with the gypsies and his continued insistence on the moral standards of the city in the gypsy encampment challenge the notion that happiness can be found by reverting to nature. The poem closes with a clear attack on the idea of the noble savage: "But even among you, poor sons of nature, there is no happiness! Tormenting dreams live under your bedraggled tents". [Но счастья нет и между вами, / Природы бедные сыны!... / И под издранными шатрами / Живут мучительные сны.] (ll.562–565)

The Gypsies is the last of Pushkin's "Southern Poems", and is usually considered to be the most mature and sophisticated of these works. The "Southern Poems" are indebted to Byron: they use exotic and orientalized settings, rapid transitions, and chart sexual and military conquest. Stephanie Sandler sees it as an expression of "a kind of liberal individualism in which respect for the person is valued above all else, in which the dignity of the individual is fundamental." However, critics agree that The Gypsies, while inheriting much from the Byronic tradition, also strives to move away from it. Michael Wachtel argues that "the grim, fatalistic acceptance of life as a tragedy and of individual experience as endless repetition brings the work closer to Antiquity than to Byron". Antony Wood suggests that The Gypsies is a parody of both Rousseau's Noble Savage idea and Byron's verse tales, pointing out that "Aleko, pursuing the ideal of the Noble Savage, himself comes to present the spectacle of an ignoble citizen." John Bayley argues that The Gypsies "shows the problem of a poet as naturally classical as Pushkin in an epoch fashionably and self-consciously romantic."

== Adaptations ==
Boris Gasparov estimates that The Gypsies has inspired some eighteen operas and half a dozen ballets, including Sergei Rachmaninoff's Aleko (1893), Ruggero Leoncavallo's Zingari (1912), and Vasily Kalafati's Gypsies [Tsygany] (1941).

It is speculated that The Gypsies was the inspiration for Prosper Mérimée's novella Carmen written in 1845, on which Georges Bizet's opera Carmen was based in 1875. Mérimée had read the poem in Russian by 1840 and translated it into French in 1852.

== Sources ==
- Briggs, A.D.P. (1982) Alexander Pushkin: A Critical Study Duckworth: London.
- Briggs, A.D.P. (2004) "Did Carmen come from Russia?" in English National Opera Programme.
- Gasparov, Boris. (2006) "Pushkin in music" in The Cambridge Companion to Pushkin, ed. Andrew Kahn. Cambridge: CUP
- Hammond A. "Music Note" in programme for Carmen. Royal Opera House Covent Garden, 1984
- Pushkin, A.S. and Bondi S.M. (ed.) (1960) ЦЫГАНЫ in Собрание сочинений в десяти томах Moscow.
- Pushkin, Aleksandr, Antony Wood and Simon Brett. (2006) The Gypsies & Other Narrative Poems. Boston, MA: David R. Godine.
