= Cesare Valletti =

Italian opera singer

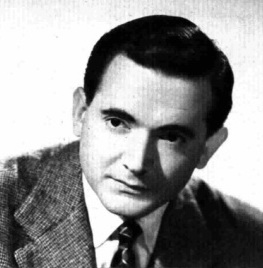
- Cesare Valletti, 1958
- Born: 18 December 1922; Rome
- Died: 13 May 2000 (aged 77); Genoa, Italy
- Occupation: operatic tenor
- Years active: 1947-68
- Spouse: Nicoletta Braibanti

Cesare Valletti (18 December 1922 – 13 May 2000) was an Italian operatic tenor, one of the leading tenore di grazia of the postwar era.

Valletti was born in Rome, where he studied music. He also studied privately with Tito Schipa. He made his debut in Bari, as Alfredo in La traviata, in 1947. He came to prominence in 1950, when he sang in Il turco in Italia, opposite Maria Callas, in Rome. In the same year he made his debut at La Scala in Milan, singing Fenton in Falstaff, a role he reprised when the company took the production to Covent Garden later that year.

In 1951, Valletti went to Mexico City to sing La traviata with Maria Callas. He also partnered her in the famous Visconti production of La sonnambula, conducted by Leonard Bernstein, at La Scala in 1955, and again in La traviata at Covent Garden in 1958.

In September 1953, he made his American debut at the San Francisco Opera in the title role of Werther, opposite Giulietta Simionato as Charlotte, and later that same year, in December, he debuted at the Metropolitan Opera in New York, singing Don Ottavio in Don Giovanni. Other roles at the Met included Tamino, Almaviva, Nemorino, Ernesto, Alfredo, and des Grieux. His career at the Met ended abruptly in November 1960 when manager Rudolf Bing replaced Valletti, for no apparent reason, after dress rehearsal in a new production of L'elisir d'amore. Valletti left the Met and thereafter refused numerous offers to return.

In the 1960s Valletti returned to Italy, where he was particularly popular at the Maggio Musicale Fiorentino in Florence. He extended his range to art song, and became a highly respected recitalist. Valletti officially retired in 1967, but returned in 1968 to appear at the Caramoor Festival in New York. There he sang his last role, Nerone in Monteverdi's L'incoronazione di Poppea.

After retirement he flourished in a new career in his father-in-law's pasta machine making business. Valletti was married to Nicoletta Braibanti, a granddaughter of Italian composer Ildebrando Pizzetti. In May, 2000, Valletti died of a heart attack in Genoa, Italy, while undergoing treatment for liver cancer.

He can be heard on "live recordings" in the two aforementioned historical performances of La sonnambula and La traviata with Maria Callas. Valletti can also be heard in a best-selling RCA Victor recording of Madama Butterfly which paired him with Anna Moffo.

== Selected studio recordings ==
- Cimarosa - Il matrimonio segreto - Alda Noni, Ornella Rovero, Giulietta Simionato, Sesto Bruscantini, Antonio Cassinelli - Orchestra of the Maggio Musicale Fiorentino, Manno Wolf-Ferrari (1950, Florence)
- Mozart - Don Giovanni - Giuseppe Taddei, Italo Tajo, Mary Curtis Verna, Carla Gavazzi, Elda Ribetti, Vito Susca - Coro e Orchestra della Rai Torino, Max Rudolf (1953, Turin)
- Rossini - L'italiana in Algeri - Giulietta Simionato, Graziella Sciutti, Mario Petri, Marcello Cortis - La Scala Chorus and Orchestra, Carlo Maria Giulini (1954, Milan)
- Rossini - Il barbiere di Siviglia - Robert Merrill, Roberta Peters, Fernando Corena, Giorgio Tozzi - Metropolitan Opera Chorus and Orchestra, Erich Leinsdorf (1958, New York)
- Rossini - La cenerentola - Giulietta Simionato, Saturno Meletti, Cristiano Dalamangas - Coro e Orchestra della Rai Torino, Mario Rossi (1949, Turin)
- Donizetti - L'elisir d'amore - Alda Noni, Afro Poli, Sesto Bruscantini - Coro e Orchestra della Rai Roma, Gianandrea Gavazzeni (1952, Rome)
- Verdi - Maria Callas and Mario Zanasi, the "London Traviatta director Nicola Rescigno and Covent Garden Orchestra (1958, London)
- Donizetti - La fille du régiment - Lina Pagliughi, Sesto Bruscantini, Rina Corsi - Coro e Orchestra della Rai Milano, Mario Rossi (sung in Italian) (1950, Turin)
- Donizetti - Don Pasquale - Alda Noni, Mario Borriello, Sesto Bruscantini - Coro e Orchestra della Rai Torino, Mario Rossi (1949, Turin)
- Verdi - La traviata - Rosanna Carteri, Leonard Warren - Rome Opera Chorus and Orchestra, Pierre Monteux (1956, Rome)
- Puccini - Madama Butterfly - Anna Moffo, Rosalind Elias, Renato Cesari - Rome Opera Chorus and Orchestra, Erich Leinsdorf (1957), Rome
- Schumann - Dichterliebe "Poet's Love", Op.48 - Leo Taubman, piano (1960)

== Sources ==
- Opera News, Obituaries, August 2000.
- The Metropolitan Opera Guide to Recorded Opera, edited by Paul Gruber, (W.W. Norton, 1993) ISBN 0-393-03444-5
