= Emilio Venturini =

Italian opera singer

Emilio Venturini (1878–1952) was an Italian operatic lyric tenor known for his portrayal of character roles. He made his professional opera debut in 1900 in Italy where he remained for the next several years. In 1901 he sang the role of Brighella in Mascagni's Le maschere at the Teatro Regio in Turin. He made his La Scala debut in 1903 as Froh in Wagner's Das Rheingold and sang in the premiere of Umberto Giordano's Siberia. In 1904, he originated the role of Prince Yamadori in Puccini's Madama Butterfly at La Scala.

In 1905, Venturini joined the roster of the Opéra National de Paris. In 1907 he moved to London to sing with Royal Opera at Covent Garden. In 1910, Venturini became a member of the Chicago Opera Association where he performed roles until the summer of 1917. While in Chicago he sang mostly character parts but did sing some major roles like Turiddu in Cavalleria rusticana, Edgardo in Lucia di Lammermoor and the Pinkerton in Madama Butterfly. In 1911 he sang the roles of Cassio in Verdi's Otello and Spoletta in Puccini's Tosca at the Metropolitan Opera. Venturini also returned to Italy for brief periods in 1910, 1911, and 1916 to perform roles with the Teatro Massimo in Palermo. In 1921, Venturini joined the roster at La Scala and sang roles with that opera house until 1948. He notably originated the roles of Il Tempiere in Boito's Nerone in 1924 and Pang in Puccini's Turandot in 1926. and was the first to record the role of Nereo in Boito's Mefistofele in the 1931 La Scala recording.

== Roles created ==
- 1903: Ivan in Siberia (Giordano)
- 1904: Prince Yamadori in Madama Butterfly (Puccini)
- 1925: Rutger in I cavalieri di Ekebù (Zandonai)
- 1926: Pang in Turandot (Puccini).

== Sources ==
- Operissimo.com
