= Clitennestra =

Opera by Ildebrando Pizzetti

- Opera by Ildebrando Pizzetti
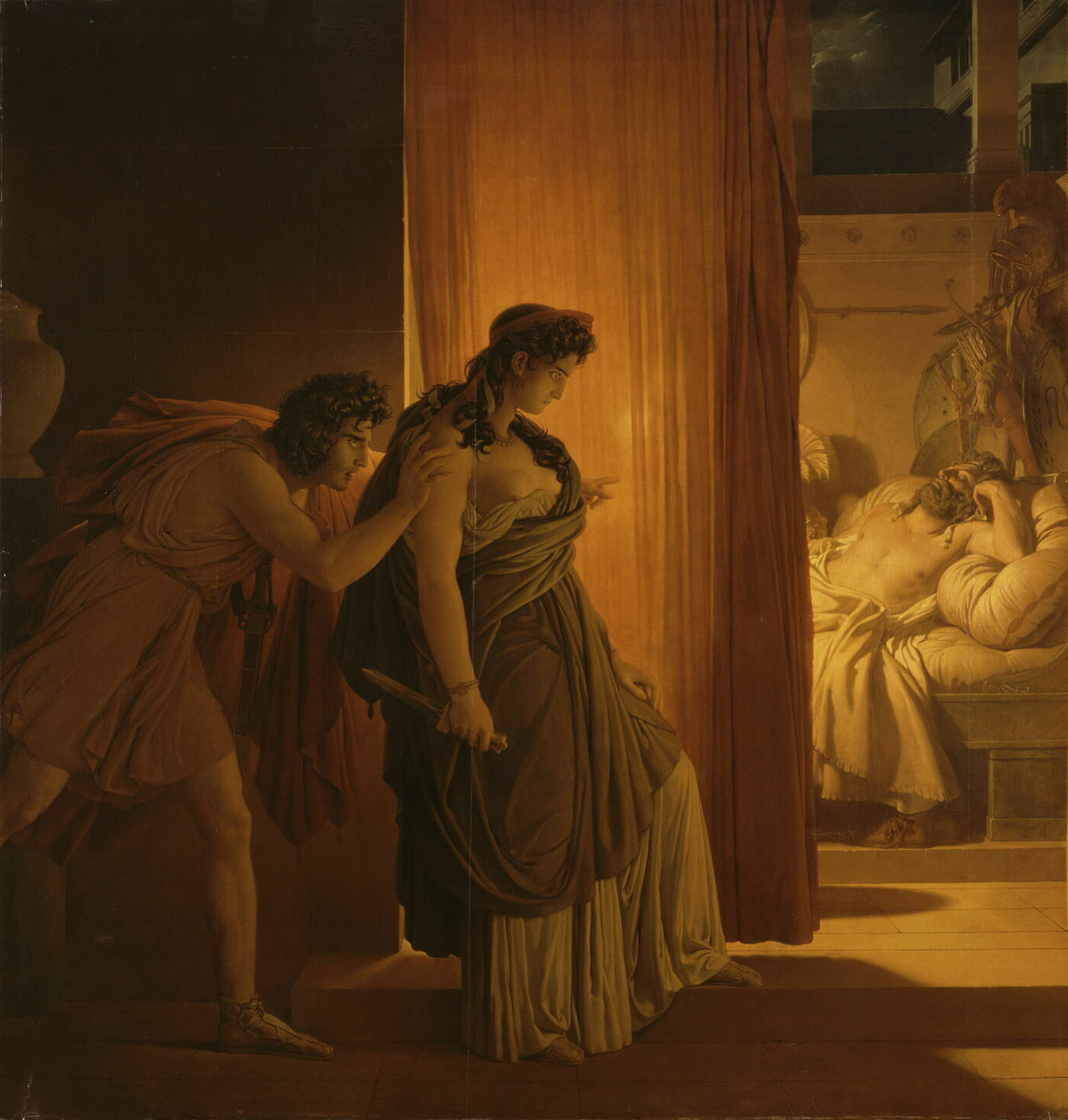
- Clytemnestra hesitates before killing the sleeping Agamemnon. On the left, Aegisthus urges her on.
- Librettist: Ildebrando Pizzetti
- Language: Italian
- Premiere: 1 March 1965; La Scala, Milan

Clitennestra, an opera in a prelude and two acts, was the last work by Ildebrando Pizzetti. The libretto is in Italian. The opera play is based on ancient Greek mythology written by Aeschylus and Sophocles. It was premiered at La Scala in Milan on 1 March 1965, conducted by Gianandrea Gavazzeni.

== Roles ==
Role	Voice type	Premiere cast, 1 March 1965 Conductor: Gianandrea Gavazzeni
Clitennestra (Clytemnestra), the Queen, Agamennone's wife	Soprano	Clara Petrella
Cassandra, Trojan's prophetess, Agamennone's concubine	Soprano	Luisa Malagrida
Agamennone (Agamemnon), the King, Trojan war hero	Bass	Mario Petri
Egisto (Aegisthus), Clitennestra's lover	Bass	Raffaele Arié
Elettra (Electra), daughter of Agamennone and Clitennestra	Soprano	Floriana Cavalli
Oreste (Orestes), son of Agamennone and Clitennestra	Tenor	Ruggero Bondino

== Synopsis ==
On his return from the Trojan war, Agamennone was murdered by his wife Clitennestra, she claims, to punish him for sacrificing their daughter Iphigenia, but in reality to be with her lover, Egisto.

Seven years later, Clitennestra was killed by her son Oreste, who had been turned away as a child and returned incognito (bringing the false news of his death) to avenge his father. Oreste, with the help of his sister Elettra, kills Clitennestra and Egisto, then goes into exile to punish himself for the crime committed, abandoning Elettra in despair.

== Recordings ==
Year	Cast: Clitennestra, Cassandra, Agamennone, Egisto, Elettra, Oreste	Conductor, Opera house, orchestra	Label
1965	Clara Petrella, Luisa Malagrida, Mario Petri, Raffaele Ariè, Floriana Cavalli, Ruggero Bondino	Gianandrea Gavazzeni, Teatro alla Scala Orchestra and Chorus, Milan	Fiori FI-1265 (2 discs)
