= Mario Petri =

Italian opera singer

- Mario Petri (photo with dedication)
- Occupation: opera singer

Mario Petri (21 January 1922 – 26 January 1985) was an Italian operatic bass-baritone particularly associated with Mozart and Rossini roles.

== Life and career ==
Petri was born in Perugia and began his career after World War II, making his stage debut in 1947 at the Teatro alla Scala in Milan, where he sang the following year the role of Creonte in the company premiere of Stravinsky's Oedipus Rex, he also sang there his first Don Giovanni in 1950, a role he quickly became associated with throughout Italy.

He appeared in Rome, Florence, Venice, Parma, Bergamo, Verona, and Naples. He sang opposite Maria Callas in the revival of Cherubini's Medea. In 1951, for the celebration of Verdi's 50th death anniversary, he sang on Italian radio (RAI) in I Lombardi, I masnadieri, and Simon Boccanegra.

Soon his reputation as Don Giovanni led to an invitation to appear at the festivals of Glyndebourne, Salzburg, and Edinburgh. He sang relatively little outside Europe, though he made a few guest appearances in Dallas in 1965.

His repertory included both Paisiello's and Rossini's Il barbiere di Siviglia, Le nozze di Figaro, L'italiana in Algeri, La cenerentola, Mosè in Egitto, Semiramide, opposite Joan Sutherland, etc.

On records, Petri can be heard in L'italiana in Algeri, opposite Giulietta Simionato as Isabella and Cesare Valletti as Lindoro, under Carlo Maria Giulini, as well as the aforementioned I Lombardi and Simon Boccanegra.

A 1960 Italian television production of Don Giovanni has been released on DVD, with a cast including Teresa Stich-Randall as Anna, Leyla Gencer as Elvira, Graziella Sciutti as Zerlina, Luigi Alva as Ottavio, and Sesto Bruscantini as Leporello.

From 1960 to 1965 he appeared in 18 motion pictures, mostly in the "Sword and Sandal" genre. He died at Città della Pieve, aged 63.

== Repertoire ==
- Mozart
  - Figaro/Le Nozze di Figaro
  - Don Giovanni/Don Giovanni
  - Sarastro/Die Zauberflöte
- Monteverdi
  - Seneca/L'incoronazione di Poppea
- Paisiello
  - Don Basilio/Il barbiere di Siviglia
- Pergolesi
  - Count Robinson/La cambiale di matrimonio
- Cherubini
  - King Creon/Medea
- Galuppi
  - Don Tritemio/Il filosofo di campagna
- Rossini
  - Mustafa/L'italiana in Algeri
  - Don Basilio/Il barbiere di Siviglia
  - Don Magnifico/La Cenerentola
  - Mose/Mosè in Egitto
  - Assur/Semiramide
- Donizetti
  - Duke Don Alfonso/Lucrezia Borgia
- Verdi
  - Pagano/I Lombardi alla prima crociata
  - Macbeth/Macbeth
  - Massimiliano/I masnadieri
  - Jacopo Fiesco/Simon Boccanegra
  - Renato/Un ballo in maschera
  - Rodrigo, Marchese di Posa/Don Carlos
  - Ramfis/Aida
- Puccini
  - Jack Rance/La fanciulla del West
- Ponchielli
  - Alvise/La Gioconda
- Boito
  - Simon Mago/Nerone
- Debussy
  - Arkel/Pelléas et Mélisande
- Pizzetti
  - Agamennone/Clitennestra

== Sources ==
- Operissimo.com
