= I cavalieri di Ekebù =

Opera by Riccardo Zandonai

I Cavalieri di Ekebù
- Opera by Riccardo Zandonai
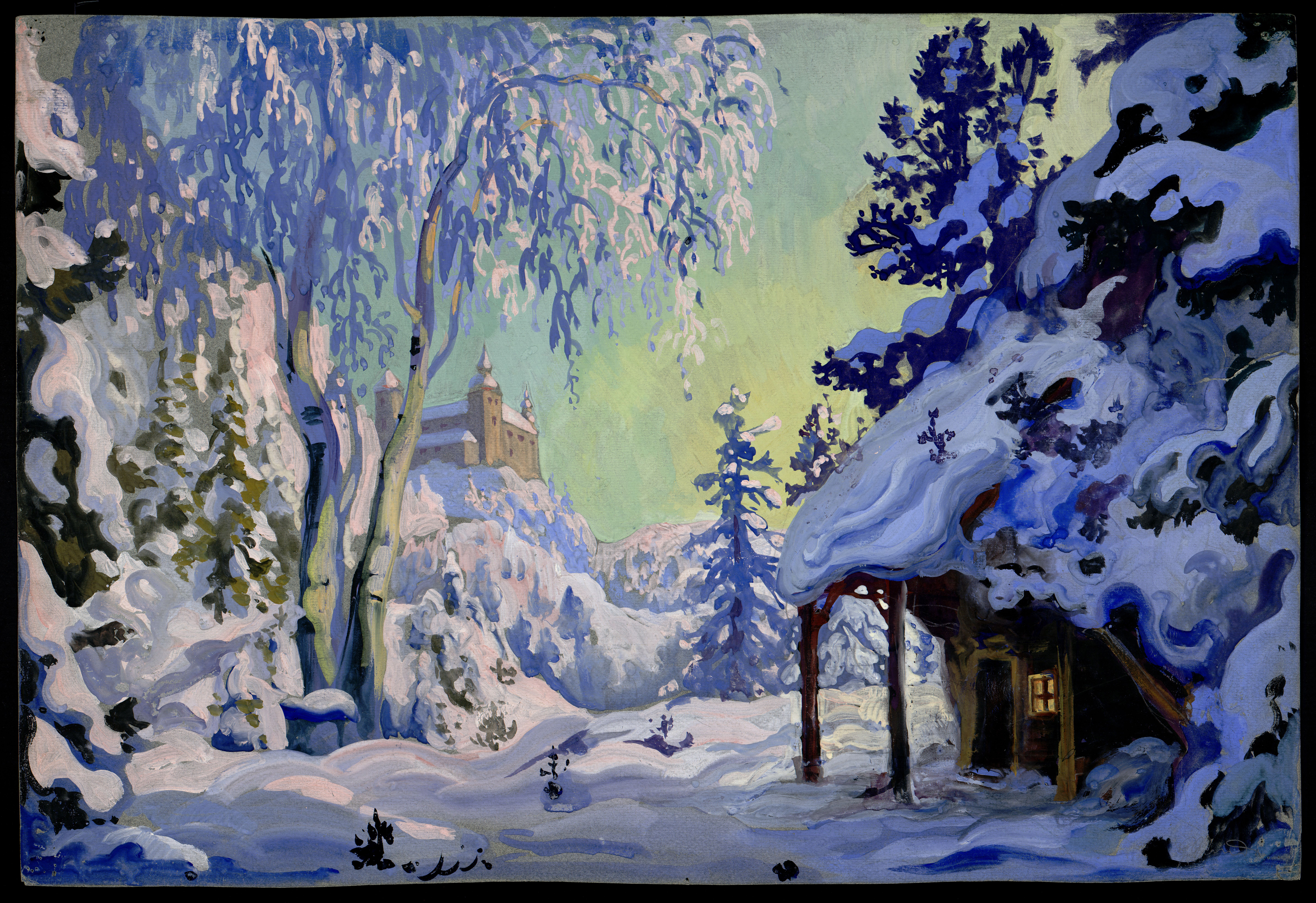
- Set design for act 1 in the premiere
- Librettist: Arturo Rossato
- Language: Italian
- Based on: Selma Lagerlöf's Gösta Berling's Saga
- Premiere: 7 March 1925; La Scala Milan

I cavalieri di Ekebù is an opera composed by Riccardo Zandonai to an Italian libretto by Arturo Rossato. The opera is based on Swedish Nobel Prize-winning author Selma Lagerlöf's 1891 debut novel Gösta Berling's Saga. It was first performed at the Teatro alla Scala in Milan on 7 March 1925. The opera was staged in Nuremberg in 1929, and the Vereingigten Städtischen Bühnen Krefeld/Mönchengladbach presented a production by Tony Palmer in 1987.

== Roles ==
Cast	Voice type	Premiere, 7 March 1925 Conductor: – Arturo Toscanini)
Giosta Berling	tenor	Franco Lo Giudice
The commander	mezzo-soprano	Elvira Mari-Casazza
Anna	soprano	Maria Luisa Fanelli
Anna's mother	mezzo-soprano	Lina Lanza
Sintram	bass	Fernando Autori
Cristiano	baritone	Benvenuto Franci
Fuchs	baritone	Pariso Votto
Everardo	baritone	Aristide Baracchi
Wemburgo	baritone	Chase Baromeo
Samzelius	bass	Carlo Walter
Berencreuz	bass	Amleto Galli
Kristoffer	bass	Giuseppe Menni
Liecrona	tenor	Alfredo Tedeschi
Rutger	tenor	Emilio Venturini
Kenvellere	tenor	Giovanni Genzardi
Røster	tenor	Palmiro Domenichetti
Julius	tenor	Giuseppe Nessi
Hostess	mezzo-soprano	Ida Mannarini
A girl	soprano	Anita Apolloni

== Sources ==
- Casaglia, Gherardo (2005). "I cavalieri di Ekebù, 7 March 1925". L'Almanacco di Gherardo Casaglia (in Italian).
- www.italianopera.org
