= Rosanna Carteri =

Italian soprano (1930–2020)

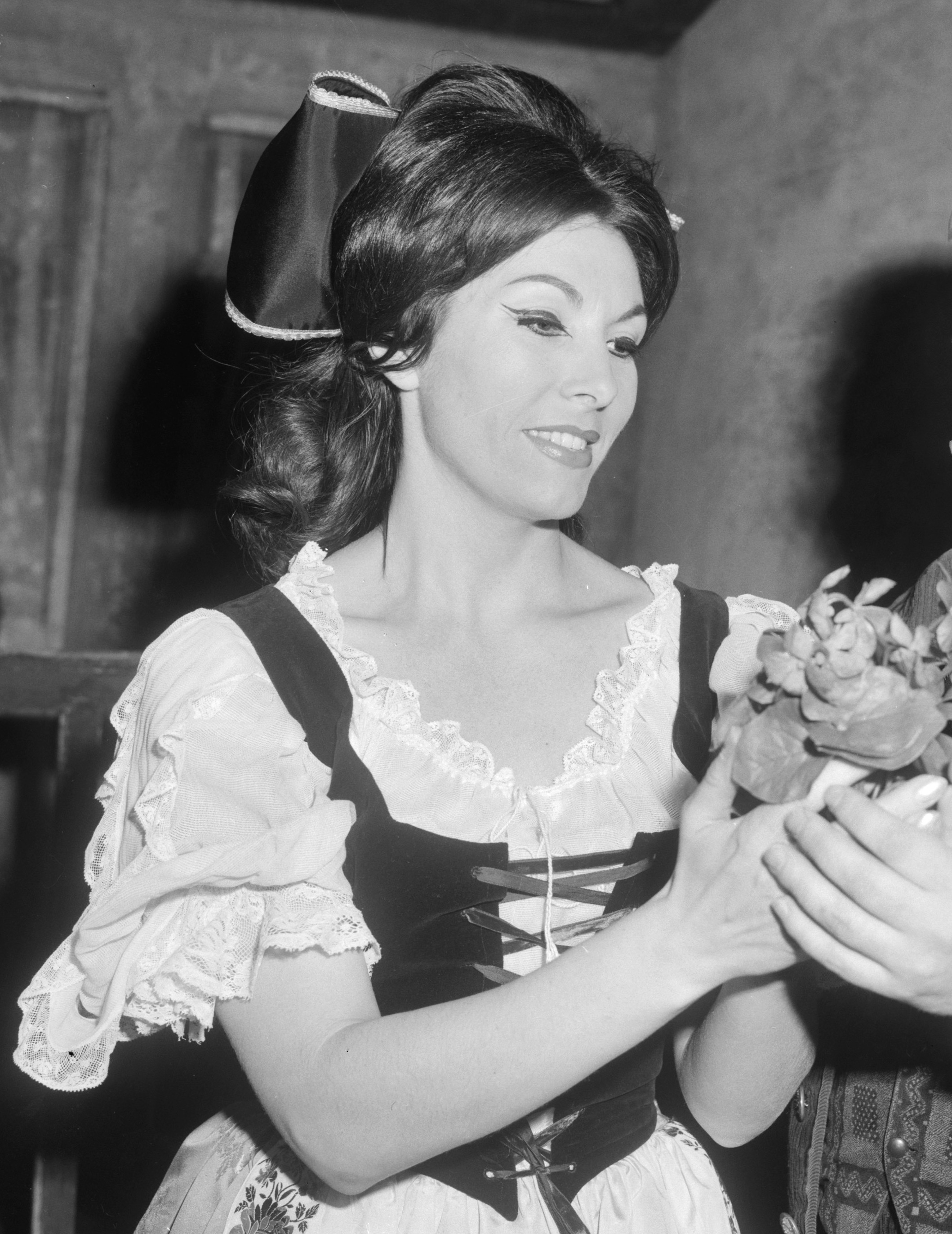
- Rosanna Carteri in 1964
- Born: 14 December 1930; Verona, Italy
- Died: 25 October 2020 (aged 89); Monte Carlo, Monaco
- Occupation: Operatic soprano

Rosanna Carteri (14 December 1930 – 25 October 2020) was an Italian soprano, primarily active from the 1950s through the mid 1960s. After her debut in Rome at age 19 as Elsa in Wagner's Lohengrin, she appeared in leading roles internationally, based at La Scala in Milan. She participated in world premieres such as the title role of Pizzetti's Ifigenia.

== Life and career ==
Rosanna Carteri as Elsa in Lohengrin.

Rosanna Carteri was born in Verona and raised in Padua. She studied with Ferrucio Cusinati and started singing in concert at the age of twelve. She won a RAI singing contest in 1948 which led to her operatic debut at the Baths of Caracalla in Rome as Elsa in Wagner's Lohengrin in 1949, aged only 19. She made her La Scala debut in Milan in 1951 in the title role of Piccinni's La buona figliuola, directed by Giorgio Strehler. She first sang at the Salzburg Festival as Desdemona in Verdi's Otello in 1952, conducted by Wilhelm Furtwängler, and at the San Francisco Opera as Mimi in Puccini's La bohème in 1954. She repeated the role at the Lyric Opera of Chicago, and returned the following year as Marguerite in Gounod's Faust and as Adina in Donizetti's L'elisir d'amore. She travelled to Edinburgh for the 1957 Festival where her indisposition allowed her understudy, Renata Scotto, to make her Edinburgh debut as Adina three nights before shooting to international fame as a replacement for Maria Callas in Sonnambula. Carteri appeared at the Verona Arena as Liu in Puccini's Turandot in 1958, at the Royal Opera House in London in Puccini's La Bohème in 1960, and at the Paris Opera in 1961 as Violetta in Verdi's La traviata.

Carteri made a few recordings for Cetra Soria early in her career, in such operas as Rossini's Guglielmo Tell, La bohème and Puccini's Suor Angelica in 1951. She recorded La traviata for RCA Victor with Cesare Valletti and Leonard Warren, conducted by Pierre Monteux in 1956 in a production from the Rome Opera. and recorded La Donna del Lago, conducted by Tullio Serafin, in 1958. She participated in several television productions for RAI such as Mozart's Le nozze di Figaro, Otello, and Verdi's Falstaff. She appeared in the title role of Puccini's La rondine in a black-and-white television film in 1958, alongside Giuseppe Gismondo, with orchestra and choir of Teatro di San Carlo in Naples, conducted by Michele Lauro. She was the soprano soloist in a 1961 recording of Poulenc's Gloria, with choir and orchestra of the RTF conducted by Georges Prêtre.

Carteri also participated in the creation of some contemporary works. She performed the title role of Pizzetti's Ifigenia in its premiere performanca as a RAI broadcast 1950, as well as in the first scenic production as part of the Maggio Musicale Fiorentino in 1951. She took part in the premiere of Proserpina e lo straniero by Juan José Castro in 1952, of Ildebrando Pizzetti's Il calzare d'argento in 1961 and of Il mercante di Venezia by Mario Castelnuovo-Tedesco also in 1961.

Carteri decided to retire from opera in 1966 at age 36, to devote her time to her family. She was married to Franco Grosoli; the family relocated from Italy to Monte Carlo in the 1970s to protect the children against kidnappings which were rampant at the time.

Carteri died on 25 October 2020 in Monte Carlo at the age of 89. She was the last surviving performer of the 56 singers interviewed in Lanfranco Rasponi's landmark series of interviews of retired divas, The Last Prima Donnas (1982).
