= Giuseppe Nessi =

Italian opera singer

Giuseppe Nessi as Erochka in Prince Igor, Teatro alla Scala, 1948 (photo with dedication)

Giuseppe Nessi (25 September 1887 – 16 December 1961) was an Italian operatic tenor.

== Life ==
Nessi was born in Bergamo, near Milan in Italy. He made his debut in Saluzzo in 1910, in the role of Alfredo in La Traviata. On the advice of Italian conductor Tullio Serafin, the majority of his career was focussed on character tenor roles. He was La Scala's leading comprimario tenor between 1921 and 1959, and also performed at the Royal Opera House, Covent Garden, and at the Salzburg Festival under Arturo Toscanini. He created, among others, the roles of Pong in Turandot, the Priest in Il re, Donna Pasqua in Il campiello, and an archer in Francesca da Rimini; in Zandonai's opera he would later regularly perform the role of Malatestino, which became one of his notable parts together with Bardolph in Falstaff.

== Recordings ==
As a character tenor, Nessi was less likely than many other singers to be cast in a lead role. He does, however, play minor supporting roles on several important recordings, including:

- The Marriage of Figaro (Wolfgang Amadeus Mozart) — Rolando Panerai (Figaro), Irmgard Seefried (Susanna), Mario Petri (Count Almaviva), Elisabeth Schwarzkopf (Countess Almaviva), Sena Jurinac (Cherubino), Luisa Villa (Marcellina), Silvio Maionica (Dr. Bartolo), Antonio Pirino (Don Basilio), Giuseppe Nessi (Don Curzio), Franco Calabrese (Antonio), Mariella Adani (Barbarina), Chorus and Orchestra of the Teatro alla Scala, Herbert von Karajan (1954)
- La sonnambula (Vincenzo Bellini) — Maria Callas (Amina), Cesare Valletti (Elvino), Giuseppe Modesti (Rodolfo), Eugenia Ratti (Lisa), Pier Luigi Latinucci (Alessio), Giuseppe Nessi (Notaro), Gabriella Carturan (Teresa), Chorus and Orchestra of the Teatro alla Scala, Leonard Bernstein (1955)
- The Barber of Seville (Gioacchino Rossini) — Tito Gobbi (Figaro), Luigi Alva (Il Conte Almaviva), Maria Callas (Rosina), Melchiorre Luise (Dr. Bartolo), Nicola Rossi-Lemeni (Don Basilio), Anna Maria Canali (Berta), Pier Luigi Latinucci (Fiorello), Giuseppe Nessi (Un Ufficiale), Chorus and Orchestra of the Teatro alla Scala, Carlo Maria Giulini (1956)
- Turandot (Giacomo Puccini) — Maria Callas (Turandot), Eugenio Fernandi (Calaf), Elisabeth Schwarzkopf (Liù), Mario Borriello (Ping), Renato Ercolani (Pang), Piero De Palma (Pong), Nicola Zaccaria (Timur), Giuseppe Nessi (The Emperor), Giulio Mauri (Un mandarino), Chorus and Orchestra of the Teatro alla Scala, Tullio Serafin (1957)
