= Fra Gherardo =

Opera by Ildebrando Pizzetti

- Opera by Ildebrando Pizzetti
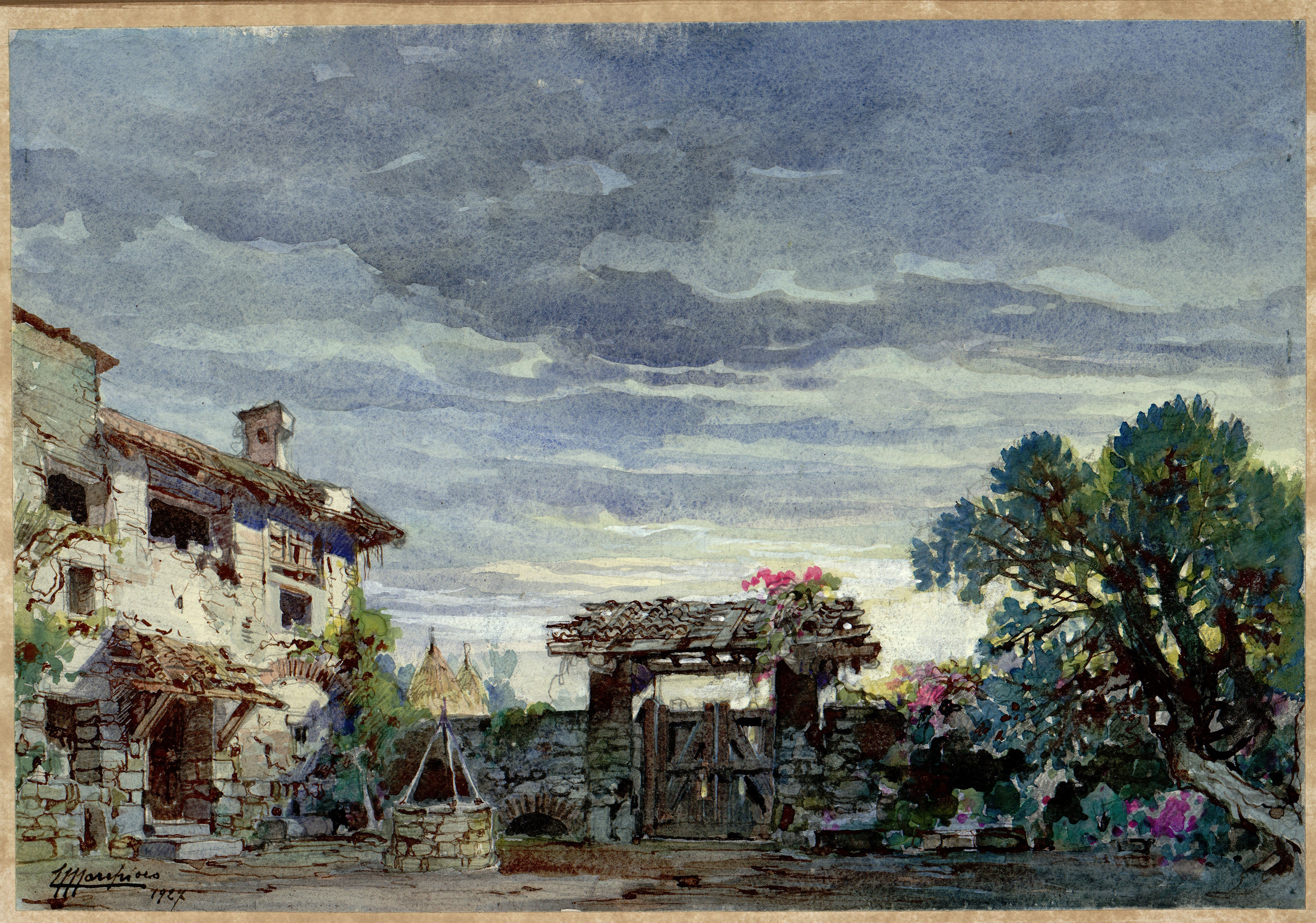
- Il cortile della casa di Gherardo, set design for Fra Gherardo act 1 scene 1 (1927).
- Librettist: Ildebrando Pizzetti
- Language: Italian
- Premiere: 16 May 1928; La Scala, Milan

Fra Gherardo is an opera in three acts composed by Ildebrando Pizzetti who also wrote the libretto. Set in Parma at the end of the 13th century, the opera's story is based on the life and death of Gherardino Segalello as chronicled by Salimbene of Parma. Pizzetti composed the work, his fifth opera, between 1925 and 1927. The world premiere took place at La Scala, Milan on 16 May 1928 in a performance conducted by Arturo Toscanini with Antonin Trantoul and Florica Cristoforeanu in the leading roles of Fra Gherardo and Mariola.

== Roles ==
Role	Voice type	Premiere cast, 16 May 1928 (Conductor: Arturo Toscanini)
Gherardo	tenor	Antonin Trantoul
Mariola	soprano	Florica Cristoforeanu
Friar Guido Putagio, The guercio, The commissioner of the Podestà	baritone	Aristide Baracchi
Friar Simone, The notary	tenor	Giuseppe Nessi
The mayor, A gentleman	baritone	Salvatore Baccaloni
The bishop, An old man	baritone	Edoardo Faticanti
a mother, an old woman, the blind, a little friar, an unbeliever, members of the council, soldiers, guards, beggars, people

== Synopsis ==
=== Act 1 ===
Parma, 1260

Gherardo, a rich man, announces that he has sold all his properties to give money to the poor. He then distributes the money to them, and praising poverty. While many people rushes to witness, a blonde woman and a gentleman intervene mocking and insult his kindness. A young and poor girl, Mariola, speaks up defending him. Later, Gherardo defended that same young woman from the harassment of two drunken soldiers: and invited her to his house. He can’t resists her beauty, and at that night, they spend the night together and make love. The dawn of the next morning, he feels guilty and accuses Mariola for diverting him from the choice to dedicate his life to God; convinced that he had committed a serious sin.

=== Act 2 ===
July 16, 1269

Gherardo has become a friar and leads a revolt against the corrupt city and religious authorities. His harsh and offensive methods, however, created discontent even among his supporters. The night of that same day, Mariola meets Gherardo and tells him about the life full of deprivation that he led in those years, and of the death of his son, born from their union. In spite of everything, she still loves him, and encourages him to continue on his mission. Gherardo, full of remorse, is arrested by the guards of the Podestà.

=== Act 3 ===
July 18, 1269

The bishop and the mayor told Gherardo that Mariola has also been arrested but he can save her by making public confession. Gherardo agrees to confess of heretic and will give up his battles, thinking that it is the only way to save Mariola. But when Gherardo was taken in the crowd, he saw her, his heart lights up. Shortly after, Mariola was killed by a woman who had lost a son in the previous unrest. Before he was sentenced to death (burn at the stake), Gherardo reminds everyone that "... one is the law / one Truth: / Give without asking, / and love, love, love!".

== Recordings ==
- 1958 - Mirto Picchi (Gherardo), Clara Petrella (Mariola), Enzo Sordello (Guido Putagio), Mario Carlin (Frate Simone), Silvio Maionica (Il podestà), Piero Guelfi (Il vescovo). Conductor: Angelo Questa, Orchestra e Coro di Milano della RAI. Label: La Maison de la Lirique; Fiori; House of Opera CD16831.
- 1972 - Angelo Mori (Gherardo), Gabriella Tucci (Mariola), Giovanni Antonini (Guido Putagio), Florindo Andreolli (Frate Simone), Silvano Carroli (Il podestà), Domenico Trimarchi (Il vescovo). Conductor: Bruno Bartoletti, Orchestra e Coro di Roma della RAI. Label: Omega Opera Archive 2218.
