= Dèbora e Jaéle =

Opera by Ildebrando Pizzetti

- Opera by Ildebrando Pizzetti
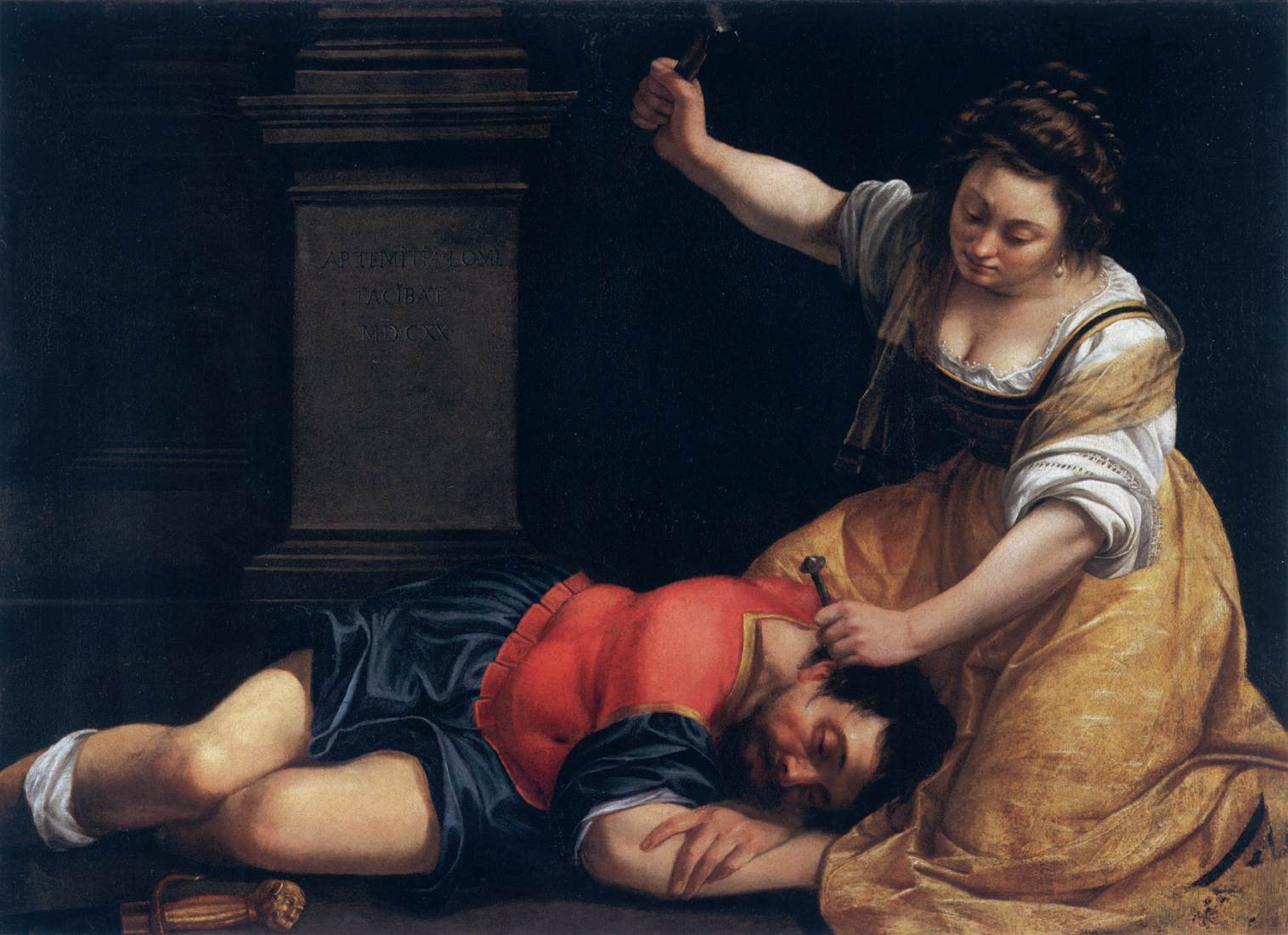
- Jael killing Sisera, the climax of Act 3
- Librettist: Ildebrando Pizzetti
- Language: Italian
- Premiere: 16 December 1922; La Scala, Milan

Dèbora e Jaéle (Deborah and Jael) is an opera in three acts composed by Ildebrando Pizzetti who also wrote the libretto. The libretto is based on the story of Deborah and Jael from the Book of Judges in the Bible. However, it differs in several ways from the traditional Biblical account, primarily in the motivations of its characters and the relationships between them. The opera was first performed at La Scala, Milan on 16 December 1922.

Pizzetti described Dèbora e Jaéle as "The first opera that is truly all my own", distancing himself from the poet Gabriele D'Annunzio whose work had a significant influence on Pizzetti's early career.

== Roles ==
Role	Voice type	Premiere cast Conductor: Arturo Toscanini
Dèbora	contralto	Elvira Mari-Casazza
Jaéle	soprano	Giulia Tess
Mara	mezzo-soprano	Anna Gramegna
Azriél	tenor	Alfredo Tedeschi
Scillèm	tenor	Luigi Cilla
King Sisera	tenor	John Sample
Piràm/shepherd	tenor	Aristide Baracchi
Jàfìa	tenor	Giuseppe Nessi
A slave	tenor	Guido Uxa
Jèsser	baritone	Osvaldo Pellegrini
Hèver	bass	Umberto Di Lelio
Baràk	bass	Vincenzo Cassia
Blind man of Kinnèreth	bass	Ezio Pinza
Nabì/Adonisédék	bass	Giovanni Azzimonti
Talmài	bass	Amleto Galli

== Synopsis ==
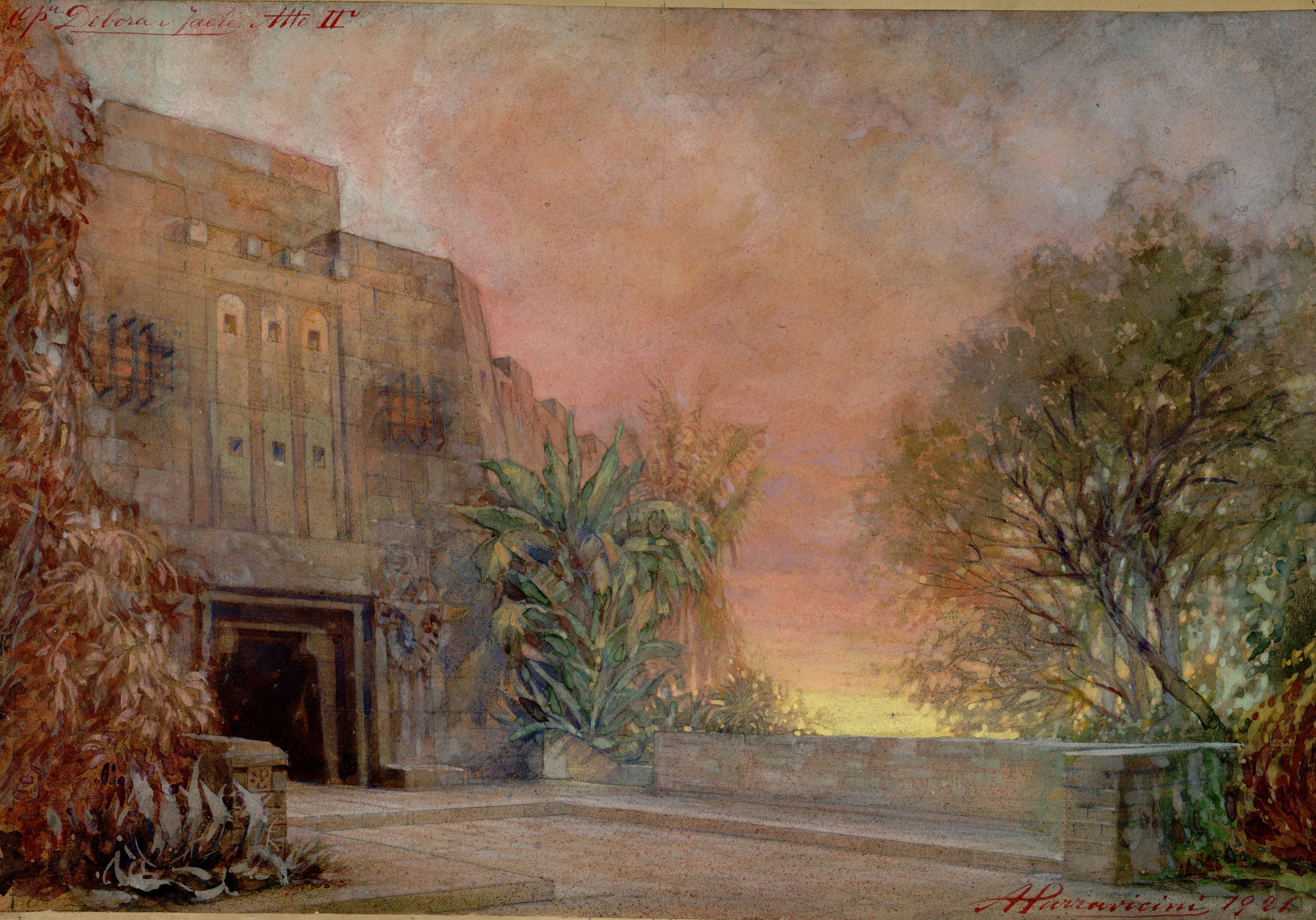
Set design by Angelo Parravicini

=== Act 1 ===
The Israelite prophetess Deborah preaches war against the Canaanite king Sisera. Sisera is hiding within the walls of an impregnable fortress. Knowing the king is in love with Jael, she sends the latter, accompanied by Mara, to lure him out.

=== Act 2 ===
Jael is brought into the king's presence and attempts to kill him. But she falls in love with Sisera and he pardons her. Mara sings of the son she has lost at the hands of the Canaanites and stirs Jael's conscience. Sisera allows Jael to leave the fortress, promising to meet her again after he has defeated the Israelites.

=== Act 3 ===
The Israelites defeat the Canaanites in battle and Sisera seeks refuge in Jael's tent. Deborah demands that he be handed over but Jael refuses. But, as an Israelite mob approaches, Jael kills Sisera in his sleep to save him from a worse death.
