= Manno Wolf-Ferrari =

- Born: 5 September 1911; Venice, Italy
- Died: 17 April 1994 (aged 82)
- Occupation: Conductor (music)

Manno Wolf-Ferrari (5 September 1911 – 17 April 1994) was an Italian conductor, nephew of composer Ermanno Wolf-Ferrari.

He studied in Venice and Siena, and quickly established himself as a leading conductor of the Italian opera repertory, which he performed widely in Italy but also abroad, notably in Monte-Carlo, London, Madrid, Australia and New Zealand. In June 1949 while in Brisbane, Queensland, his wife, the soprano Rina Mariosa, gave birth to a son, whom they christened Giuseppe Brisbane Wolff-Ferrari.

In 1951 he recorded the premiere recording of Cimarosa's opera Il matrimonio segreto with the Orchestra del Maggio Musicale Fiorentino and a cast headed by Alda Noni, Giulietta Simionato, Cesare Valletti and Sesto Bruscantini for Warner Fonit.

== Sources ==
- Le guide de l'opéra, Roland Mancini & Jean-Jacques Rouveroux, (Fayard, 1996), ISBN 2-213-59567-4
