= Ildebrando Pizzetti =

Italian composer (1880–1968)

Ildebrando Pizzetti OMRI
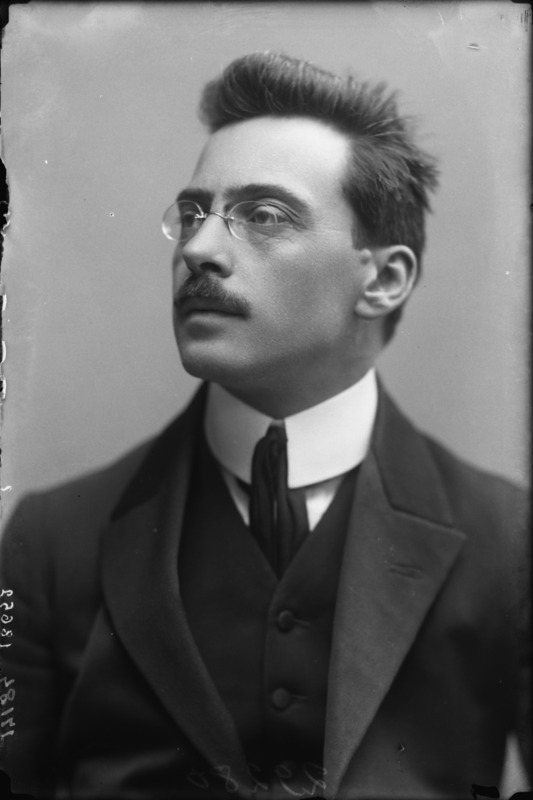
- Born: 20 September 1880; Parma, Italy
- Died: 13 February 1968 (aged 87); Rome, Italy
- Resting place: Campo Verano, Rome
- Era: 20th century

Ildebrando Pizzetti (20 September 1880 – 13 February 1968) was an Italian composer of classical music, as well as a musicologist and a music critic.

== Biography ==
Pizzetti was born in Parma in 1880. He was part of the "Generation of 1880" along with Ottorino Respighi, Gian Francesco Malipiero, and Alfredo Casella. They were among the first Italian composers in some time whose primary contributions were not in opera. The instrumental and a cappella traditions had never died in Italian music and had produced, for instance, the string quartets of Antonio Scontrino (1850–1922) and the works of Respighi's teacher Giuseppe Martucci; but with the "Generation of 1880" these traditions became stronger.

Ildebrando Pizzetti was the son of Odoardo Pizzetti, a pianist and piano teacher who was his son's first teacher. At first Pizzetti seemed headed for a career as a playwright—he had written several plays, two of which had been produced—before he decided in 1895 on a music career and entered the Parma Conservatory. There he was taught from 1897 by Giovanni Tebaldini and gained the beginnings of his lifelong interest in the early music of Italy, reflected in his own music and his writings.

Ildebrando Pizzetti (photo with 1947 dedication)

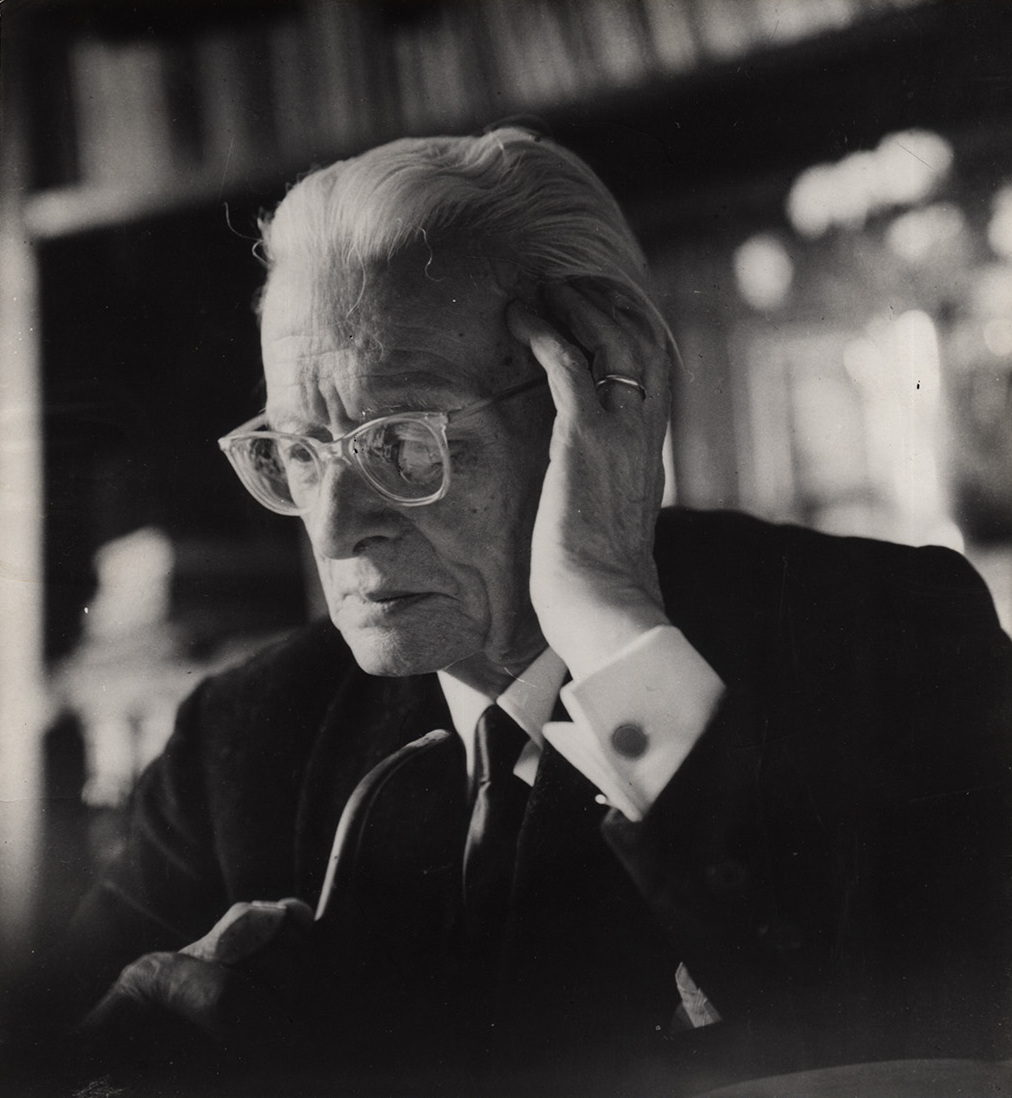
Ildebrando Pizzetti

He taught at the Florence Conservatory (director from 1917 to 1923), directed the Milan Conservatory from 1923, and was Respighi's successor at the National Academy of St Cecilia in Rome from 1936 to 1958. He also served as the academy's president from 1948 to 1951, before passing the baton to Alessandro Bustini. His students included Mario Castelnuovo-Tedesco, Olga Rudge, Manoah Leide-Tedesco, Franco Donatoni and Amaury Veray. See: List of music students by teacher: N to Q#Ildebrando Pizzetti. Also a music critic, he wrote several books on the music of Italy and of Greece and co-founded a musical journal. Pizzetti was an active supporter of fascism and signed the Manifesto of the Fascist Intellectuals in 1925.

A disciple of poet, playwright and revolutionary Gabriele d'Annunzio, Pizzetti wrote incidental music to his plays, and was highly influenced by d'Annunzio's dark neoclassic themes. One of Pizzetti's later operas, La figlia di Jorio, is a setting of d'Annunzio's 1904 eponymous play.

He was named to the Royal Academy of Italy in 1939. As noted by Franco Sciannameo, his relations with the Fascist government of the 1940s were often positive, sometimes mixed; he received at one point high awards, and the one symphony of his mature years was the product of a commission from their Japanese allies to celebrate the "XXVI Centennial of the foundation of the Japanese Empire" (Benjamin Britten's Sinfonia da Requiem was also commissioned for this event, though it was rejected on account of its finale; its original finale was rediscovered after Britten's death and only premiered then.). Pizzetti's Symphony in A was premiered as noted in the article, and recorded in 1940, and again by Naxos with his Harp Concerto (Naxos 8573613, 2017).

His Violin Concerto in A was premiered in 1944 by Gioconda de Vito; this seems to be the only 20th-century violin concerto she ever played.

Some of his works were published under the name "Ildebrando da Parma".

== Selected works ==
=== Operas ===
- Sabina (1897)
- Il Cid (1903)
- Aeneas (1903)
- Mazeppa (1905, unfinished)
- Gigliola (1914, unfinished)
- Fedra (1915)
- Dèbora e Jaéle (1922)
- Fra Gherardo (1928)
- Lo straniero (1930)
- Orsèolo (1935)
- L'oro (1947)
- Vanna Lupa (1949)
- Ifigenia (1950)
- Cagliostro (1953)
- La figlia di Jorio (1954)
- Povera gente (1956, unfinished)
- Assassinio nella cattedrale (1958) (with Nicola Rossi-Lemeni and Leyla Gencer in the first cast, conducted by Gianandrea Gavazzeni, staged by Margherita Wallmann at La Scala)
- Il calzare d'argento (1961)
- Clitennestra (1965)

=== Orchestral music ===
- Symphony in A in celebrazione del XXVIo centenario della fondazione dell'Impero giapponese. 1940
- Incidental music, especially to plays by d'Annunzio, especially
  - La Pisanelle (1912–13)
- Suite from La Pisanelle (premiered 1919)
- Harp concerto in E-flat (1960)
- 3 Sonetti del Petrarca
- Tre composizioni corali
- Other vocal works, e.g. Epithalamium (1939? 1940, played at a Library of Congress concert in April 1940 and again in 1977)
- Cello concerto in C minor (1933–34)
- Violin concerto in A (1944)
- Viola concerto (1955, unfinished)
- Canti della stagione alta : concerto for piano and orchestra (1930)
- Sinfonia del fuoco (from music for the silent film Cabiria)
- Rondo veneziano (1929)
- Concerto dell'Estate
- Tre Preludii sinfonici per L'Edipo Re di Sofocle (1903)

=== Chamber music ===
- Violin sonata in C minor (1900)
- String Quartet n.1 in A major (1906)
- Violin sonata in A (championed by Yehudi Menuhin) written 1918–9, pub. 1920
- Cello sonata in F 1921, pub. 1922
- Tre canti for cello and piano (1924)
- Piano sonata pub. 1942
- Piano trio in G minor (1900)
- Piano trio in A (from 1925)
- String Quartet n.2 in D (written 1932–33, pub. 1934)

=== Sacred music ===
- Messa di Requiem (1922–1923)
- Cantata: Filiae Jerusalem, Adjuro Vos (1966)

=== Film scores ===
- Cabiria (1914) (Pizzetti provided the 10-minute Sinfonia del Fuoco for the pivotal sacrifice scene of the film)
- The Ship (1921)
- The Betrothed (1941)

== Bibliography ==
- Renato Fondi (1919), Ildebrando Pizzetti e il dramma musicale italiano d'oggi (tr. "Ildebrando Pizzetti and the Italian musical drama of today")
- Gatti, Guido M. (1951). Ildebrando Pizzetti. Translated by Moore, David. London: Dennis Dobson. ISBN 0-234-77138-0. OCLC 382628.
- Susanna Pasticci (ed.), Ildebrando Pizzetti. Sulle tracce del modernismo italiano – Ildebrando Pizzetti, Retracing Italian Modernism, monographic volume of «Chigiana. Journal of Musicologial Studies», vol. 49, Lucca: LIM 2019.
