= Sulla tua bocca lo dirò =

Studio album by Mina
- Released: 20 February 2009
- Recorded: 2009
- Studios: Studio 2 Radio Svizzera, Lugano; Forum Music Village, Rome
- Genre: Classical
- Length: 56:20
- Languages: Italian; English; Spanish
- Label: PDU
- Producer: Massimiliano Pani

Mina studio albums chronology
Todavía (2007)	Sulla tua bocca lo dirò (2009)	Facile (2009)

Alternative cover

Professional ratings
Review scores
Source	Rating
AllMusic	3.5/5 stars

Sulla tua bocca lo dirò is a studio album by Italian singer Mina released on 20 February 2009 by PDU. The title of the album is taken from a line in the aria Nessun dorma Sulla tua bocca lo dirò fremente, ed il mio bacio scioglierà il silenzio che ti fa mia...

== Production ==
"The disc that Mina had always wanted to do" were the words of Massimiliano Pani at the presentation of this album, in which Mina sings interpretations of classical music. There are many pop singers who have sung or interpreted classical music. On the international scene two particular albums stand out: the album Classical Barbra released in 1976, where Barbra Streisand addresses an essentially lieder repertoire with music by Debussy, Fauré, Orff, Schumann, Händel. The second album is by Sarah Vaughan with the album Sarah Slightly Classical of 1963 where she interprets Debussy, Tchaikovsky, Chopin, Saint-Saëns. In Italy, however, the most significant pop-classical albums were released by Alice with Mélodie passagère in 1988, Giuni Russo with A casa di Ida Rubinstein in 1988 and the two albums of Albano Carrisi, Anthology in 1974 and classical Concert in 1997.

This was not the first time that Mina ventured into the classical repertoire. On television shows there are various examples, such as the one in Musica da sera in 1967, where she, with flutist Severino Gazzelloni, interprets the "Seconda fuga in do minore" by Bach. Even in her discography there are examples of the merging between classical and light pop: "Chopin cha cha" in 1962 and "Ridi pagliaccio" in 1988. This album does not pretend to be an anthology overview of opera. The choice of songs is centred on the figure of Giacomo Puccini, present with four works (Manon Lescaut, La Bohème, Tosca and Turandot). These songs act as a link between the glorious tradition of Italian opera (Giuseppe Giordani and Albinoni) and the twentieth century (Leonard Bernstein, George and Ira Gershwin, Francesco Cilea, Astor Piazzolla). All songs are reworked and arranged by Gianni Ferrio. The aim of this album is to turn the classic music pieces in the songs, in the modern sense of the term.

== Songs ==
The opening track is "Mi chiamano Mimì" an soprano aria from the opera La bohème written by Giacomo Puccini. The interpretation is essentially identical to the one presented in Teatro 10 in 1972 (available on the album Gentlemen ... Mina! Vol. 4). Even though Mina has a wide soprano range, Ferrio reworked the piece so that it is sung in a much lower tone.

The interpretation of the second song, "Ideale", a romance for voice and piano by Francesco Paolo Tosti, is almost identical to the one presented on the television program Milleluci in 1974.

"I Have a Love" is an excerpt from the famous musical West Side Story, written by Stephen Sondheim music by Leonard Bernstein. Mina has always loved this piece of music and in an episode of "Johnny Sera" in 1966 she sang a medley with Johnny Dorelli, dedicated to the American musical that ended with "Tonight", another famous song of West Side Story.

Baroque music is represented by "Caro mio ben", a famous aria composed in the eighteenth century and attributed to Giuseppe Giordani There is also a version by Sting included on his live album The art of the heart

The meeting between Astor Piazzolla and Mina dates back to 1972 "Teatro 10" where they presented their duet "Balada para mi muerte", found on the album Signori ... Mina! Vol. 3, 1993. The current album includes the track "Oblivion" with the unpublished lyrics of Alba Fossati.

The Adagio in G minor by Albinoni has a fairly controversial history. With "Mi parlavi adagio" Mina proposes the controversy of the aria with the text of Giorgio Calabrese.

Other unpublished lyrics of Giorgio Calabrese is the prelude to the third act of Manon Lescaut by Giacomo Puccini (Manon is locked up in the prison of Le Havre waiting to be embarked for America). In this interlude, originally only an instrumental, lyrics were added with respect to the original score.,

A medley of two songs, "Bess, You Is My Woman Now" and "I Loves You, Porgy" from the opera Porgy and Bess is a tribute by Mina to George Gershwin. Mina's interest in the American composer goes back to Studio Uno in 1961 when she presented her version of the song "Summertime ", which was later included on the album Moliendo café (1962).

"È la solita storia…," is a famous aria taken from act II of the opera L'arlesiana by Francesco Cilea. It is sung by Federico, who is deeply in love with a girl from Arles, the Arlesiana of the title, but his family has arranged his marriage with Vivetta. Vivetta has always loved Federico since childhood and is disappointed to know of his love for l'Arlesiana. When he has been left alone, Federico reads the letters of l'Arlesiana and ponders them with his broken heart.

Nessun dorma (English: None shall sleep) is an aria from the final act of Giacomo Puccini's opera Turandot, and is perhaps the most lyrical piece of music known to the public, thanks to Luciano Pavarotti, which had made it a staple in his repertoire, especially in his performances outside the opera houses. Several artists, including Aretha Franklin; Jeff Beck; Chris Botti,; Sarah Brightman, amongst others.

The last two tracks are "E lucevan le stelle" taken from the opera Tosca and "Sono andati?" taken from La bohème. At the end of the last song is a hidden track, the popular mariachi song "Cielito lindo" by Fabrizio De André.,

== Artwork ==
A first album cover was designed by Gianni Ronco, reworking the poster of the historic Turandot of 1926 style Liberty, then set aside, but the image still appears in the album sleeve. For the final cover was chosen a photographic version performed by Mauro Balletti used the same photo shoot for the album Salomè. Balletti used the same internal images of the libretto inspired by the works of the painter bohemian Tamara de Lempicka.

== Track listing ==
No.	Title	Lyrics	Music	Length
1.	"Mi chiamano Mimì" (From La bohème)	Giuseppe Giacosa; Luigi Illica	Giacomo Puccini	6:37
2.	"Ideale"	Carmelo Errico	Francesco Paolo Tosti	4:00
3.	"I Have a Love" (From West Side Story)	Stephen Sondheim	Leonard Bernstein	3:38
4.	"Caro mio ben"	Giuseppe Giordani	Giordani	2:34
5.	"Oblivion (Una sombra más)"	Alba Fossati	Astor Piazzolla	4:42
6.	"Mi parlavi adagio"	Giorgio Calabrese	Tomaso Albinoni; Remo Giazotto	3:49
7.	"Manon (Preludio al terzo atto di "Manon Lescaut")" (From Manon Lescaut)	Calabrese	Puccini	3:49
8.	"Bess, You Is My Woman Now / I Loves You, Porgy" (From Porgy and Bess)	DuBose Heyward; Ira Gershwin	George Gershwin	5:15
9.	"È la solita storia..." (From L'arlesiana)	Leopoldo Marenco	Francesco Cilea	3:46
10.	"Nessun dorma" (From Turandot)	Giuseppe Adami; Renato Simoni	Puccini	3:32
11.	"E lucevan le stelle" (From Tosca)	Giacosa; Illica	Puccini	2:46
12.	"Sono andati?" (From La bohème)	Giacosa; Illica	Puccini	5:23
13.	"Cielito lindo" (Ghost track)	Quirino Mendoza y Cortés	Mendoza y Cortés	3:25
Total length:				56:20

== Other versions ==
- Mi chiamano Mimì

1972 Version on the album Signori... Mina! vol. 4

== Musicians ==
- Mina – voice

=== Musical arrangement ===
- Gianni Ferrio

=== Other musicians ===
- Recording sessions in Lugano
  - Anna Loro – harp
  - Rino Ghiretti – bass tuba
  - Ugo Bongianni – celesta
  - Gabriele Comeglio, Corrado Giuffredi, Santo Risorto – clarinet
  - Ermanno Ferrari (First contrabass), Paolo Badini, Enrico Fagone – contrabass
  - Massimo Moriconi – contrabass pizzicato
  - Ugo Favaro, Pierluigi Filagna, Danilo Stagni – horns
  - Francesca Dellea, Bruno Grossi, Lucia Grossi Piccioni – flute
  - Federico Cicoria – oboe
  - Gabriele Comeglio – ocarina
  - Gabriele Comeglio, Mauro Negri – sax soprano
  - Diego Gatti, Danilo Moccia, Floriano Rosini – trombone
  - Antonio Leofreddi (First viola), Gustavo Fioravanti, Nathalie Gazelle, Giampaolo Guatteri, Matthias Müller, Aurelie Sauvètre – viola
  - Anthony Flint (First violin), Fabio Arnaboldi, Mala Valbona Arnaboldi, Gabriele Baffero, Christa Bohny, Gao Chun He, Barbara Cinnamea, Anna Francesio, Duilio Galfetti, Anthony Gjezi, Susanne Holm, Carlo Lazzarone, Martina Mazzon, Alessandro Milani, Petja Nikiforoff, Yoko Paetsch, Irina Roukavitsina, Cristina Tavazzi, Keiko Yamaguchi, Mikako Yamashita, Walter Zagato – violin
  - Johan S. Paetsch (First cello), Ivaylo Daskalov, Marco Decimo, Jennifer Flint, Felix Vogelsang, Taisuke Yamashita – cello
- Recording sessions in Rome
  - Augusto Mentuccia – bass tuba
  - Carla Tutino (First contrabass), Maurizio Raimondo, Maria Indiana Raffaelli – contrabass
  - Stefano Aprile, Rino Pecorelli, Fabio Frapparelli – horns
  - Monica Berni, Paolo Fratini – flute
  - Gilda Buttà – piano
  - Gianni Oddi – sax soprano
  - Fausto Anzelmo (First viola), Anna Rollando, Federico Rizzo, Gualtiero També, Alessio Toro, Lorenzo Rundo – viola
  - Vincenzo Bolognese (First violin), Giulio Arrigo, Eunice Cangianiello, Elena Centurione, Anna Chulkina, Luca Cireddu, Paolo Coluzzi, Gabriele Dello Preite, Massimiliano Destro, Giulio Di Amico, Olga Doronina, Plamena Krumova, Gaspare Maniscalco, Nesnas Mervit, Michelangelo Pietroniro, Pierluigi Pietroniro, Marco Quaranta, Salvatore Spatola, Philip Sutton, Carlo Vicari – violin
  - Luca Pincini (First cello), Catarina Birkeland, Luigi Chiapperino, Michele Chiapperino, Lee Kyung-Mi, Luigi Lanzillotta – cello

== Charts ==
=== Weekly charts ===
Weekly chart performance for Sulla tua bocca lo dirò
Chart (2009)	Peak position
Italian Albums (FIMI)	2

=== Year-end charts ===
Year-end chart performance for Sulla tua bocca lo dirò
Chart (2009)	Position
Italian Albums (FIMI)	64

== Certifications ==
Certifications for Sulla tua bocca lo dirò
Region	Certification	Certified units/sales
Italy (FIMI)	Gold	35,000^{*}
^{*} Sales figures based on certification alone.
