= Gloria (opera) =

Opera by Francesco Cilea

- Opera by Francesco Cilea
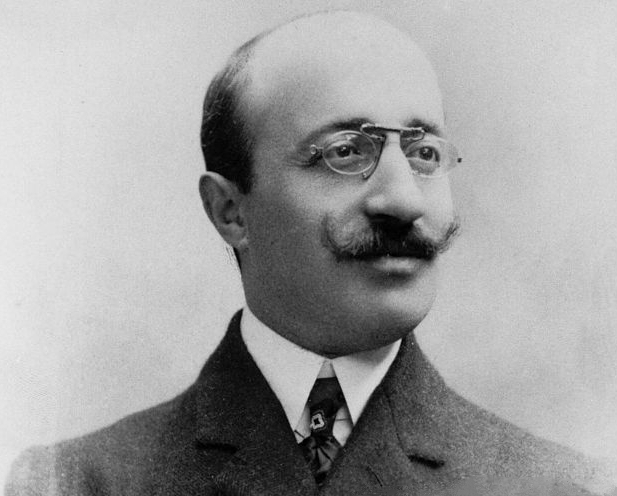
- Cilea c. 1910
- Librettist: Arturo Colautti
- Language: Italian
- Based on: Victorien Sardou's play La Haine
- Premiere: 15 April 1907; La Scala, Milan

Gloria is a tragic opera in three acts by Francesco Cilea with an Italian libretto by Arturo Colautti. A variation on the Romeo and Juliet story and set in 14th century Siena, the libretto is based on Victorien Sardou's 1874 play La Haine (Hatred). The opera premiered on 15 April 1907 at La Scala conducted by Arturo Toscanini with Solomiya Krushelnytska in the title role. Gloria was a failure at its premiere when it was withdrawn after two performances and fared little better in the 1932 revised version, although there have been two late 20th century revivals. It proved to be Cilea's last staged opera. In the 43 years following the premiere of Gloria he worked on two or three further operas which were never performed and continued to compose chamber and orchestral music.

== Composition ==
Cilea's librettist, Arturo Colautti

Like Cilea's earlier operas, L'arlesiana (1897) and Adriana Lecouvreur (1902), Gloria takes its title from its female protagonist and is based on a French play. This time, Arturo Colautti, who had also written the libretto for Adriana Lecouvreur, based the libretto on Victorien Sardou's La Haine (Hatred), a tragic tale of two lovers caught up in the conflict between the Guelphs and Ghibellines in 14th century Siena. Cilea composed Gloria while staying in the Ligurian seaside town of Varazze, which was to become his home in later life.

== Performance history ==
The opera premiered on 15 April 1907 at La Scala in Milan, conducted by Arturo Toscanini. The title role was sung by Solomiya Krushelnytska, with Pasquale Amato as her brother Folco and Giovanni Zenatello as her lover Lionetto. Despite the distinguished cast and conductor, the premiere was a failure and the opera was withdrawn after two performances. It was revived in Rome and Genoa in 1908 and again in 1909 at the Teatro di San Carlo in Naples with Emma Carelli as Gloria. Although the reception in Naples was quite favorable, the opera failed to secure a place in the regular repertoire of Italian opera houses.

Cilea continued to revise the score of Gloria during the 20 years following its initial runs, and when Pietro Ostali, a great admirer of the composer, took over Casa Sonzogno (the original publishers of Cilea's operas), he decided to promote a revival of the work. The second version of the opera with a revised libretto by Ettore Moschino had fairly extensive cuts made at the suggestion of Ostali, most notably the act 2 confrontation scene between Folco and Lionetto. Folco's name was also changed to "Bardo".

The new version premiered on 20 April 1932 at the Teatro di San Carlo and was well received by the Neapolitan audiences. It was also given a lavish production in Rome in 1938 with Maria Caniglia and Beniamino Gigli in the leading roles and sets designed by the prominent architect and sculptor, Pietro Aschieri. Although it had a successful German premiere at the Dortmund Stadttheater that same year and outdoor performances at the Castello Sforzesco in Milan and the Piazza Baraccano in Bologna in the late 1930s, Gloria soon fell into obscurity once again.

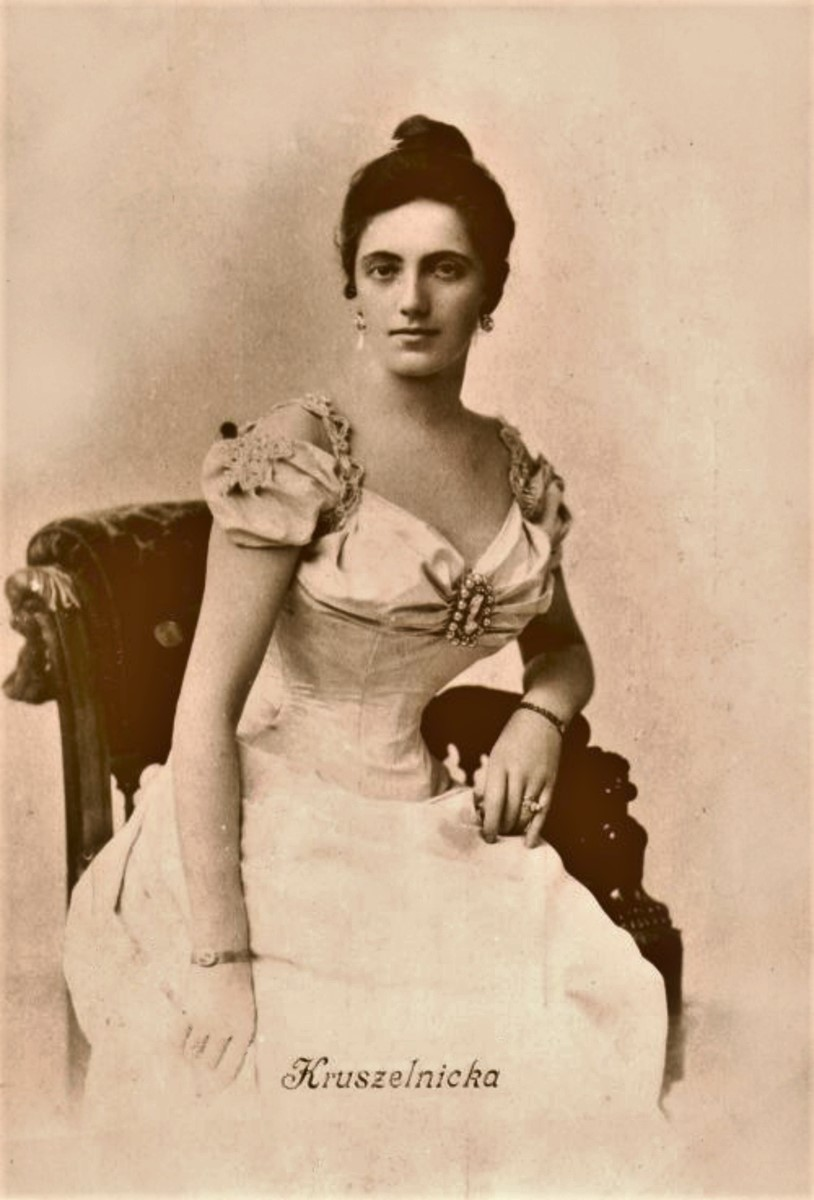
Solomiya Krushelnytska, who sang the title role at the world premiere in 1907

There were, however, two late 20th century revivals. In 1969, the opera was broadcast on radio in its entirety for the first time. Fernando Previtali conducted the RAI Symphony Orchestra and Chorus in Turin. The title role was sung by Margherita Roberti with Flaviano Labò as Lionetto. In 1997, Gloria was performed outdoors at the San Gimignano Festival using the medieval buildings of the town as sets. Marco Pace conducted the Festival di San Gimignano Orchestra and the Accademia San Felice Chorus, with Fiorenza Cedolins as Gloria and Alberto Cupido as Lionetto. Teatro Grattacielo produced the first performance in New York City at the Gerald W. Lynch Theater in a concert performance in September 2018 with Mikhail Svetlov as Aquilante.

== Roles ==
Roles, voice types, premiere cast
Role	Voice type	Premiere cast, 15 April 1907 Conductor: Arturo Toscanini
Aquilante de' Bardi, a Guelph nobleman	bass	Nazzareno De Angelis
Gloria, Aquilante's daughter	soprano	Solomiya Krushelnytska
Folco (Bardo), Aquilante's son	baritone	Pasquale Amato
Lionetto de' Ricci ("Il Fortebrando"), a Ghibelline captain	tenor	Giovanni Zenatello
Sienese woman	soprano	Nilde Ponzano
Woman from Orvieto	mezzo-soprano	Adele Ponzano
The bishop	bass	Costantino Thos
Nobles, townspeople, officials, guards

== Synopsis ==
Place: Siena
Time: the 14th century

Act 1

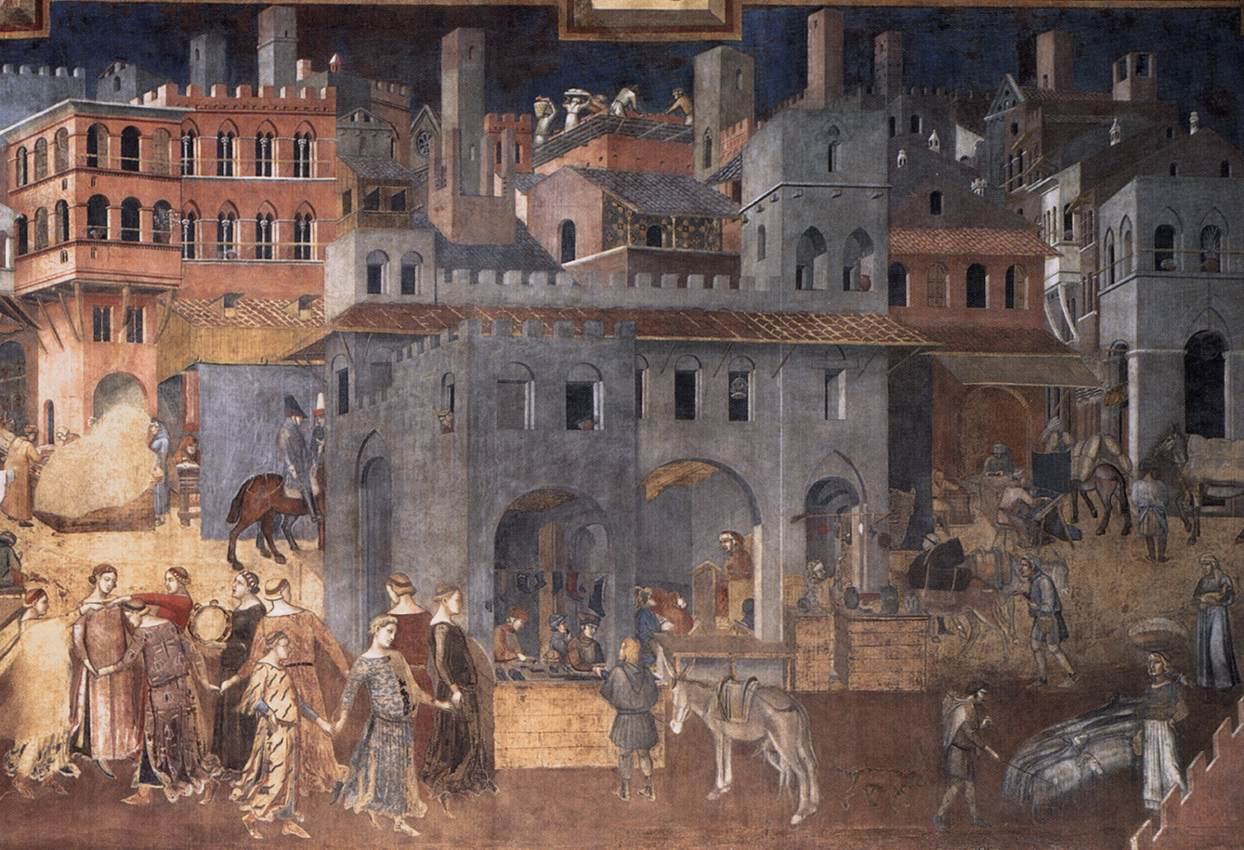
Siena in the 14th century depicted by Ambrogio Lorenzetti

In celebration of a new fountain in Siena's main square, the Guelphs, who currently hold the city, declare a temporary truce with the exiled Ghibellines and allow them to enter Siena for the festivities on condition that they come unarmed and leave the city at sunset. A chorus of young women sings the praises of the fountain, "O! Puri marmi" (Oh! Pure marble). Lionetto de' Ricci, one of the exiles, and Gloria, the daughter of Guelph nobleman Aquilante de' Bardi, are attracted to each other when she gives him water to drink from the fountain. Gloria sings "Amore, amor! Fonte muta" (Love, love! Silent fountain). Her brother Bardo, demands to know the exile's name. Lionetto recounts the story of his family, "Storia ho di sangue" (My story is one of blood), and Aquilante realises that he the son of the nobleman who had previously surrendered Montalcino to the Ghibellines. At sunset Lionetto refuses to leave the city unless he can take Gloria with him as his bride. In the midst of angry protests from Aquilante, Bardo, and the other Guelph noblemen, Lionetto's cloak falls away, revealing not only that he is armed but is also a famous condottiere of the Ghibelline forces known as "Il Fortebrando". Lionetto's men, who had also concealed their swords, come to their captain's aid. They and Lionetto make their escape from Siena taking Gloria with them.

Act 2

Outside the walls of Siena, Lionetto and the Ghibelline forces continue their siege of the city. Gloria is being held in one of his chambers under the watch of a Sienese woman. The woman urges her to accept Lionetto as her husband which would bring about peace between the two factions and prevent the destruction of Siena, "Prigioniera d'amor" (Prisoner of love). Gloria is torn between her love for Lionetto and loyalty to her father and the people of Siena, "O mia cuna fiorita" (O my flowered cradle). Gloria's brother Bardo enters her chambers in disguise and berates her for betraying her people and causing the death of their father who has just been killed defending Siena. She tells Bardo that she plans to marry Lionetto as a sacrifice to end the siege, but he demands that she kill him. Terrified of blood, she refuses to take Bardo's proffered dagger but promises to poison Lionetto instead. Bardo sings of his admiration for her, "O mia dolce sorella" (O my sweet sister), and departs. Gloria sings a prayer to the Virgin Mary, "Vergine santa" (Blessed Virgin). After a musical interlude, Lionetto returns from the battle. He kneels before Gloria and tells her that out of love for her he has ended the siege, "Pur dolente son io" (Though I grieve). She attempts to drink the poison herself rather than kill him. However, he knocks the poisoned wine to floor, and she openly declares her love for him.

Act 3

Gloria and Lionetto's wedding is taking place in her family's chapel with her father's tomb in the background. The bishop and choir sing a Magnificat. After the ceremony, Lionetto embraces Bardo as a sign of peace. Bardo draws a dagger from beneath his cloak and stabs Lionetto, mortally wounding him. Bardo then tries to force Gloria from the chapel, but beside herself with grief, she refuses to leave. The sounds of battle are heard, and Bardo rushes outside with his men. Gloria and Lionetto are now alone and bid farewell to each other as he lies dying, "Gloria, ove sei?" (Gloria, where are you?) When Lionetto dies, Gloria grabs the dagger which had killed him, stabs herself to death, and falls on his body.

== Recordings ==
The opera has had two full-length recordings, both from live performances. The 1969 RAI radio broadcast conducted by Fernando Previtali was released in a remastered version by Bongiovanni Records in 2005. The 1997 performance at the San Gimignano Festival conducted by Marco Pace was released by Kicco Classic in 1998. An excerpt from Gloria appears on Verismo (Decca Classics, 2009) with Renée Fleming singing Gloria's aria "O mia cuna fiorita". Lionetto's aria "Pur dolente son io" also appears occasionally on tenor recital discs.

- DVD Gloria - Ramaz Chikviladze, Anastasia Bartoli, Franco Vassallo, Carlo Ventre, Alessandro Abis, Elena Schirru, Coro del Teatro Lirico di Cagliari, Orchestra del Teatro Lirico di Cagliari, Francesco Cilluffo Dynamic, 2023
