= Op. 38 =

In music, Op. 38 stands for Opus number 38. Compositions that are assigned this number include:

- Barber – Piano Concerto
- Brahms – Cello Sonata No. 1
- Busoni – Comedy Overture
- Chopin – Ballade No. 2
- Dvořák – Moravian Duets
- Elgar – The Dream of Gerontius
- Górecki – Beatus Vir
- Holst – Ode to Death
- Kabalevsky – Preludes
- Khachaturian – Piano Concerto
- Mendelssohn - Songs without Words, Book III
- Prokofiev – Piano Sonata No. 5
- Schoenberg – Chamber Symphony No. 2
- Schumann – Symphony No. 1
- Sibelius – Five Songs, Op. 38, collection of art songs (1903–1904)
  - This collection includes "Höstkväll" (Op. 38/1)
- Stanford – Three Latin Motets
- Strauss – Enoch Arden
- Tchaikovsky – Six Romances, Opus 38
- Wirén – Symphony No. 5 (1964)
