= Mikhail Svetlov =

Mikhail Svetlov may refer to:

- Mikhail Arkadyevich Svetlov, Russian/Soviet poet
- Mikhail Svetlov (singer), Russian/American opera singer
