= Op. 37 =

In music, Op. 37 stands for Opus number 37. Compositions that are assigned this number include:

- Arensky – Raphael
- Beethoven – Piano Concerto No. 3
- Chausson – Chanson perpétuelle
- Chopin – Nocturnes, Op. 37
- Dohnányi – Sextet
- Dvořák – The Cunning Peasant
- Elgar – Sea Pictures
- Khanon – The Shagreen Bone
- Lyapunov – Zelazowa Wola
- Prokofiev – The Fiery Angel
- Rachmaninoff – All-Night Vigil
- Saint-Saëns – Romance
- Schoenberg – String Quartet No. 4
- Schumann – Gedichte aus "Liebesfrühling"
- Sibelius – Five Songs, Op. 37, collection of art songs (1900–1902)
- Szymanowski – String Quartet No. 1
- Tchaikovsky – Piano Sonata in G major
- Tchaikovsky – The Seasons
- Vieuxtemps – Violin Concerto No. 5
