= Five Songs, Op. 38 (Sibelius) =

Collection of art songs by Jean Sibelius (1903–1904)

- Song collection by Jean Sibelius
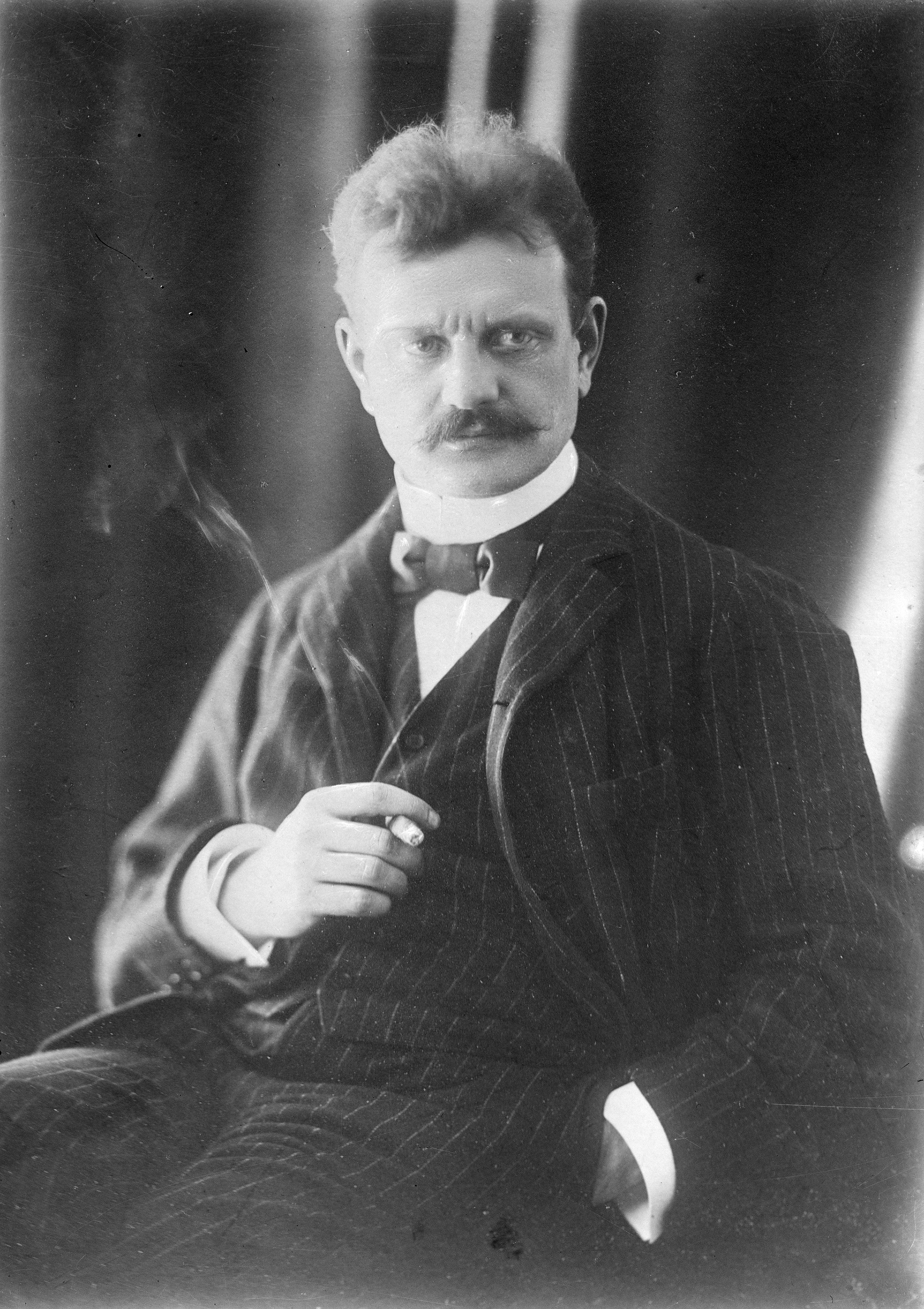
- The composer (c. 1902)
- Opus: 38
- Language: Swedish
- Composed: 1903–1904; Nos. 2–3 orch. 1903, No. 1 orch. 1904

External audio
- Sung by Helena Juntunen, accompanied by Folke Gräsbeck
- No. 1, "Höstkväll"
- No. 2, "På verandan vid havet"
- No. 3, "I natten"
- No. 4, "Harpolekaren och Hans son"
- No. 5, "Jag ville, jag core I Indialand"

The Five Songs, Op. 38, (Note: Because Sibelius's Op. 38 songs are sung in Swedish, this article gives preference to each song's native title, rather than the English translation.) is a collection of Swedish-language art songs for vocal soloist and piano written from 1903 to 1904 by the Finnish composer Jean Sibelius. (Note: All but a few of Sibelius's songs are settings of Swedish-language poems (quantitatively, his favorite poets were Ernst Josephson, Johan Ludvig Runeberg, Viktor Rydberg, and Karl August Tavaststjerna) and are with piano accompaniment. While many are of high quality, they largely have been neglected outside the Nordic realm, due to the limited coverage (in terms of number of speakers) of Swedish (relative to, for example, German or French).)

== Constituent songs ==
Ordered by catalogue number, the Op. 38 songs are as follows:

- "Höstkväll" ("Autumn Evening"), Op. 38/1 (1903); text by the Swedish poet Viktor Rydberg
- "På verandan vid havet" ("On a Balcony by the Sea"), Op. 38/2 (1903); text by Rydberg
- "I natten" ("In the Night"), Op. 38/3 (1903); text by Rydberg
- "Harpolekaren och Hans son" ("The Harper and His Son"), Op. 38/4 (1904); text by Rydberg
- "Jag ville, jag core I Indialand" ("I Wish I Were in India"), Op. 38/5 (1904); text by the Swedish poet Gustaf Fröding

The collection was first published by the Helsinki-based firm Fazer & Westerlund (Helsingfors Nya Musikhandel) from 1903 to 1904.

=== Orchestral versions of Nos. 1–3 ===
In 1903, Sibelius arranged "På verandan vid havet" and "I natten" for vocalist and orchestra; an arrangement of "Höstkväll" arrived the following year in 1904.

== Notes, references, and sources ==
=== Sources ===
- Barnett, Andrew (2007). Sibelius. New Haven, Connecticut: Yale University Press. ISBN 978-0-300-16397-1.
- Dahlström, Fabian [in Swedish] (2003). Jean Sibelius: Thematisch-bibliographisches Verzeichnis seiner Werke [Jean Sibelius: A Thematic Bibliographic Index of His Works] (in German). Wiesbaden: Breitkopf & Härtel. ISBN 3-7651-0333-0.
- Layton, Robert (1993) [1965]. Sibelius. (The Master Musicians Series) (4th ed.). New York: Schirmer Books. ISBN 0028713222.
