= Svetlov =

Svetlov may refer to

- 3483 Svetlov, inner main-belt asteroid
- Boris Svetlov, Russian film director and actor
- Mikhail Arkadyevich Svetlov, Russian/Soviet poet
- Mikhail Svetlov, Russian/American opera singer
- Mikhail Svetlov, Russian bass singer
- Sergei Svetlov, ice hockey player
