= Harriman-Jewell Series =

The Harriman-Jewell Series (2006–present) (originally known as the "William Jewell College Fine Arts Program" (1965–2000) and later the "Harriman Arts Program"(2000–06)), is a performing arts presentation organization founded in 1965, and based in Kansas City, Missouri.

Originally known as the "William Jewell College Fine Arts Program", it hosted Luciano Pavarotti's international recital debut on February 1, 1973. Held in William Jewell College’s John Gano Memorial Chapel, Pavarotti was perspiring due to nerves and a lingering cold. The tenor clutched a handkerchief throughout the debut, which became a signature part of his solo performances. Over the years, Pavarotti sang five recitals for the organization.

The Series has since hosted several leading tenors, including Giuseppe Filianoti (2012), Francisco Araiza (1982), Ben Heppner (1997), Marcelo Álvarez (2001), Juan Diego Flórez (2002), Daniil Shtoda (2002), Salvatore Licitra (2005), and Clifton Forbis (2006).

New York City Ballet’s Patricia McBride and Edward Villella danced in the Series’ first performance in December 1965, and violinist Itzhak Perlman played a recital in 1971.

The organization hosts a variety of free discovery concerts, and events that allow interaction with musicians and dancers.

On January 6, 2023 the organization celebrated its 1000th performance with soprano Pretty Yende and awarded the Richard Harriman Award to artists appearing ten or more times on the Series. The awardees were Alvin Ailey American Dance Theater, Emanuel Ax, Canadian Brass, Joyce DiDonato, Marilyn Horne, Warren Jones, Martin Katz (pianist), The King's Singers, Yo-Yo Ma, Wynton Marsalis, David Parsons and Parsons Dance, and Itzhak Perlman.

The organization also makes the performing arts an integral part of the college curriculum for William Jewell College students. Among the oldest colleges west of the Mississippi River, William Jewell was named TIME Magazine's "Liberal Arts College of the Year" for 2001-2002.

“Cezanne called the Louvre ‘the book in which we learn to read,’” said Terry Teachout, a Jewell alumnus and drama critic for The Wall Street Journal. “The Harriman program was the book in which I learned to see, hear, and love the performing arts. It gave me a golden yardstick of taste–-one I still use to this day.”

“No one will ever be able to calculate how the presence of some of the world’s most superb artists before area innocents influenced the development of resident music, dance and theater companies,” the Kansas City Star wrote of the Harriman-Jewell Series. “What Harriman has done...has multiplied in countless, wonderful ways.”

== American debut recitals ==
- Luciano Pavarotti, tenor - February 1, 1973
- Ileana Cotrubaș, soprano - November 10, 1977
- Yevgeny Nesterenko, bass - February 10, 1979
- Francisco Araiza, tenor - November 3, 1982
- Luciana Serra, soprano - October 15, 1983
- Carol Vaness, soprano - November 8, 1986
- Thomas Allen (baritone), baritone - November 4, 1989
- June Anderson, soprano - January 19, 1991
- Sergei Leiferkus, baritone - September 28, 1991
- Maxim Vengerov, violin - March 8, 1993
- Vladimir Chernov, baritone - September 29, 1995
- Ben Heppner, tenor - October 22, 1997
- Marcelo Álvarez, tenor - January 6, 2001
- Juan Diego Florez, tenor - April 21, 2002
- Daniil Shtoda, tenor - October 31, 2002
- Sergey Khachatryan, violin - September 20, 2003
- Salvatore Licitra, tenor - January 8, 2005
- Clifton Forbis, tenor - May 26, 2006
- Danielle de Niese, soprano - February 4, 2009
- Stephen Costello, tenor - March 5, 2011
- Giuseppe Filianoti, tenor - April 21, 2012
- Michael Fabiano, tenor - January 19, 2013
- Tara Erraught, mezzo-soprano - April 12, 2013
