= Lia Félix =

French actress (1830–1908)

Adélaïde "Lia" Félix (Saumur, 6 July 1830 – Paris, 15 January 1908) was a French actress.

== Biography ==
Adelaïde "Lia" Félix was the fifth of six children. Her father, Jacob Jacques Félix, was a peddler, and her mother, Esther Thérèse Hayer, was a Bohemian dealer in second-hand clothes. She had four sisters (Sophie-Sarah, Rébecca, Mélanie-Dinah, and the renowned Elisa-Rachel Élisabeth) and one brother, Raphaël.

She had hardly been given any trial when, by chance, she was called on to create the leading woman's part in Lamartine's Toussaint Louverture at the Théâtre de la Porte Saint-Martin on 6 April 1848. The play did not make a hit, but the young actress was favorably noticed, and several important parts were immediately entrusted to her. She soon came to be recognized as one of the best comedians in Paris. Rachel took Lia to United States with her to play second parts, and on returning to Paris she played at several of the principal theatres, although her health compelled her to retire for several years. When she reappeared at the Théâtre de la Gaîté in the title role of Jules Barbier's Jeanne d'Arc she had an enormous success. Her last theatrical appearance was in Victorien Sardou's La Haine in 1874. She died in Paris on 15 January 1908.

== Notes ==
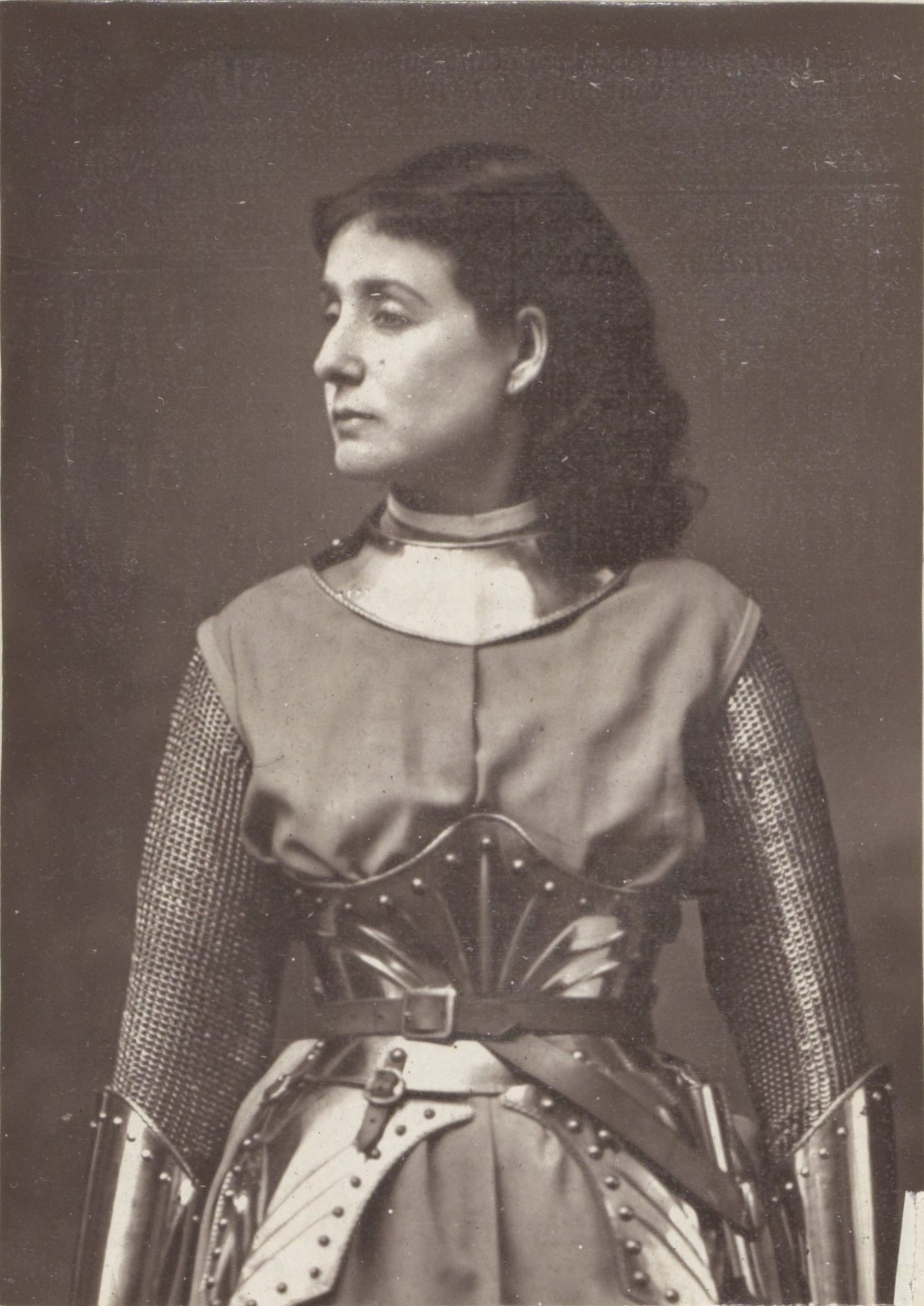
Lia Félix, was a French actress and comedian.
