= Giuseppe Filianoti =

Italian lyric tenor from Reggio Calabria

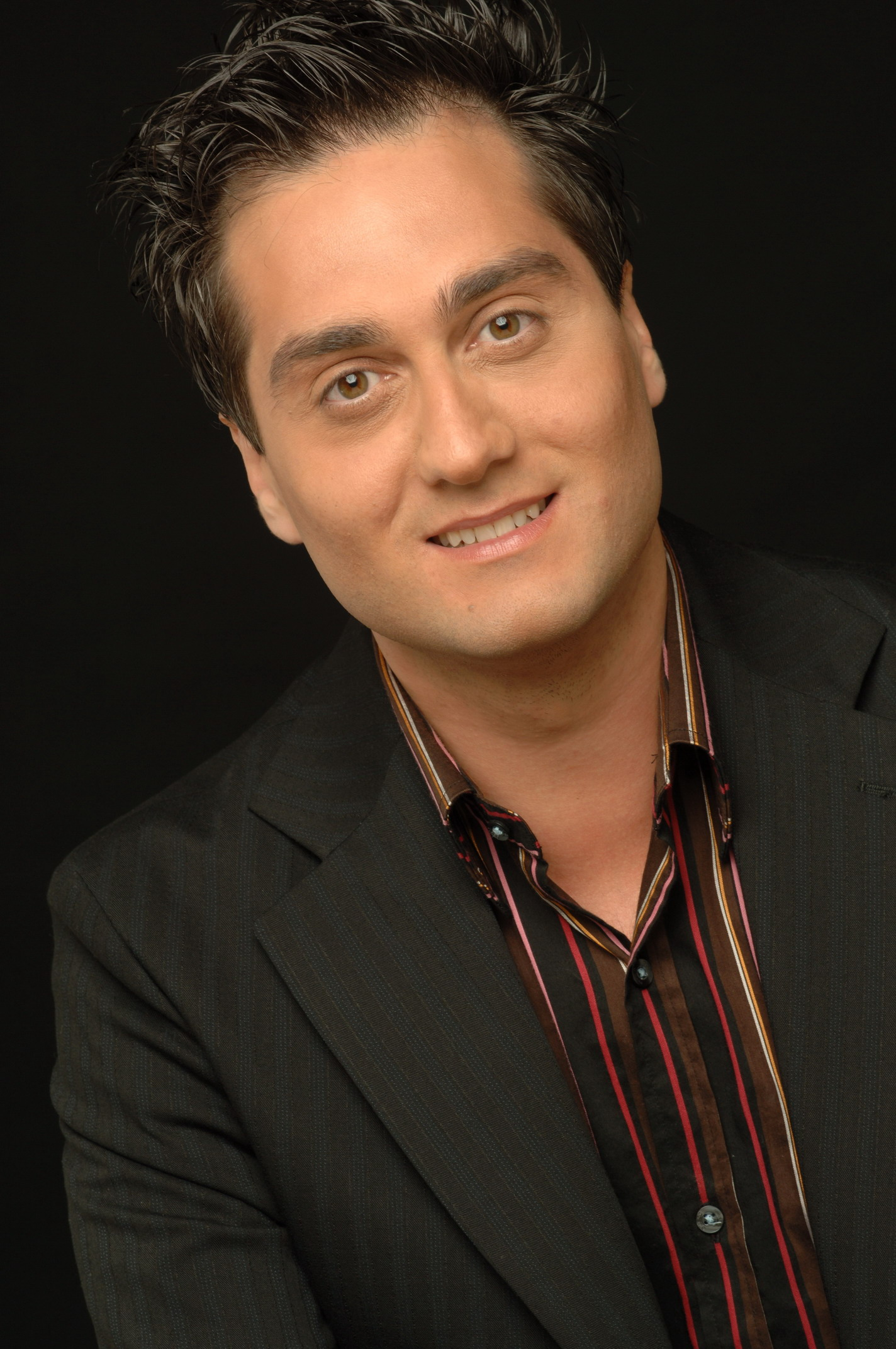
- 2006
- Born: 11 January 1974 (age 52); Reggio Calabria, Italy
- Occupations: Opera singer, tenor
- Years active: 1998–present
- Website: giuseppefilianoti.com

Giuseppe Filianoti (born 11 January 1974) is an Italian lyric tenor from Reggio Calabria.

== Early years ==
Born in 1974, the Italian tenor obtained his degree in Literature from the Università Degli Studi di Messina, in the Sicilian town of Messina. In 1997, he graduated from the 'Francesco Cilea' Conservatory in his hometown, studying under Anna Vandi. Filianoti then won a prestigious two-year scholarship to the Accademia del Teatro alla Scala in Milan. It was during this time that he met Alfredo Kraus, who became his mentor and his decisive influence in artistic approach, nuance, technique, and style.

== Career ==
Filianoti made his professional début in 1998 at Bergamo in the title role of Dom Sébastien, by Gaetano Donizetti. In 1999, after singing Argirio in Tancredi at the Rossini Opera Festival in Pesaro, he was engaged by Riccardo Muti to sing in Paisello's Nina, o sia La pazza per amore with Teatro alla Scala (La Scala). In 2003, again under Muti, he opened the season of La Scala with Rossini's Moïse et Pharaon. Since then, he has been a frequent guest at La Scala, where in addition to Moïse et Pharaon he has performed in Un giorno di regno, Gianni Schicchi, Rigoletto, Lucia di Lammermoor, Lucrezia Borgia, and Don Giovanni (opening the 2011-2012 season), and has toured with La Scala under Daniel Barenboim to Berlin, Tel Aviv, and at the Teatro Colón in Buenos Aires singing the Verdi Requiem, and to the Bolshoi as Don Ottavio in Don Giovanni. In Italy, he also has sung with the Teatro dell'Opera di Roma, the Teatro Comunale di Bologna, Teatro Regio di Torino, the Teatro Comunale di Firenze, and the Teatro Massimo in Palermo. He made his Royal Opera House, Covent Garden début in 2000 as Alfredo in La traviata, returning in the title role of Dom Sébastien in 2005 and as Nemorino in L'elisir d'amore.

In 2005 he made his American début at the Metropolitan Opera in New York as Edgardo in Lucia di Lammermoor, receiving rave reviews. At the Met he has also sung the title role in Les contes d'Hoffmann, the Duke in Rigoletto, Nemorino in L'elisir d'amore, the title role in La clemenza di Tito, and Ruggero in La rondine. In the United States, in addition to the Met, he has appeared at the San Francisco Opera as Edgardo in Lucia and at Carnegie Hall with the Opera Orchestra of New York as Federico in L'arlesiana. Nemorino was the role of his debut at the Los Angeles Opera in 2009 and at the Lyric Opera of Chicago in 2010, and he returned there in 2011 for Edgardo in Lucia di Lammermoor and in February 2013 for the Duke in Rigoletto.

Giuseppe Filianoti has also performed in the major opera houses of Europe, including the Deutsche Oper Berlin, Vienna State Opera, Hamburg State Opera, and Madrid's Teatro Real, as well as leading opera houses in Barcelona and Brussels. In recent times he has starred in a new production of L'elisir d'amore with the Munich State Opera and has appeared with the Opéra National de Paris as Des Grieux in a new production of Manon, Nemorino in L'elisir d'amore and in the title role of Les contes d'Hoffmann.

Giuseppe made his American Recital Debut on 21 April 2012 with the Harriman-Jewell Series at the Folly Theater in Kansas City, Missouri singing a program of Italian and German songs by Cilea, Pizzetti, Respighi, Tosti and Strauss. He made his London Debut Recital on 11 March 2014 at Wigmore Hall with the Rosenblatt Recital Series.

Filianoti closely identifies with the music of his compatriot Francesco Cilea. In 2006, he discovered among the composer's papers a manuscript of a song "Alba novella/Una mattina", whose lyrics he recognized as having come from the first libretto in four acts of L'Arlesiana. The song had been cut from the work after the premiere at the insistence of the publisher Casa Sonzogno and was subsequently forgotten. Filianoti brought this song to the attention of Casa Sonzogno and urged them to reinstate the aria, which was done for concerts and recordings with the Philharmonisches Orchester Freiburg in July 2012. The aria was included in its first staged performance with the Wexford Festival Opera in October 2012.

== Awards ==
In 1996 Giuseppe Filianoti won his first competition while still a conservatory student, the Concorso Internazionale di Canto “Francesco Paolo Tosti”. In January 1999 he was the winner of both the First Prize and the Top Tenor prize in the Francisco Viñas Opera Competition, and later that same year he was the second prize winner in Operalia, The World Opera Competition. In 2004 he was awarded the Franco Abbiati Italian Critics´ Prize as Best Singer of the Year. In 2010, he was awarded the San Giorgio d'Oro honor by his hometown of Reggio Calabria, given annually to those from the area who have brought prestige to their hometown.
