= Francesco Cilea =

Italian composer (1866–1950)

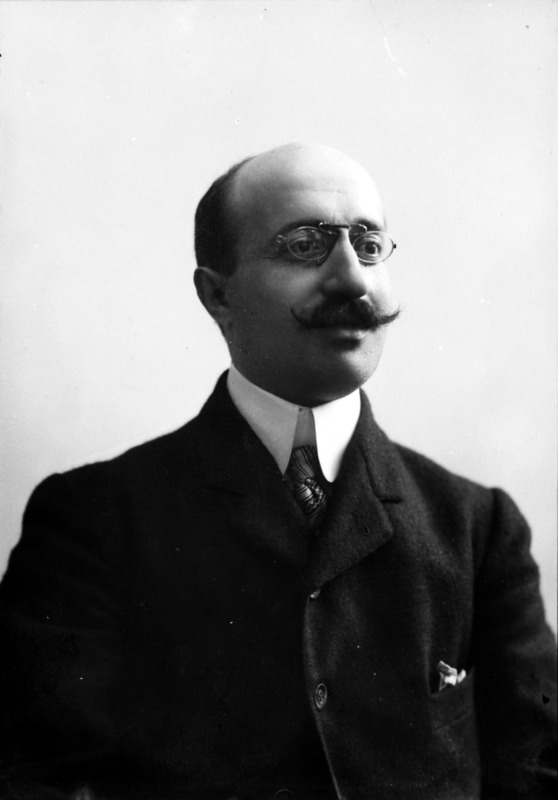
- Born: Francesco Cilea; 23 July 1866; Palmi, Calabria, Kingdom of Italy
- Died: 20 November 1950 (aged 84); Varazze, Liguria, Italian Republic
- Occupation: Composer

Francesco Cilea (Note: To prevent his name being mispronounced as [ˈtʃiːlea], Cilea himself used the accented spelling Cilèa, as can be seen from his autographs.) (Italian: [franˈtʃesko tʃiˈlɛːa]; 23 July 1866 – 20 November 1950) was an Italian composer. Today he is particularly known for his operas L'arlesiana and Adriana Lecouvreur.

== Biography ==
Born in Palmi near Reggio di Calabria, Cilea was the son of Giuseppe Cilea and Felicita Gallo. Giuseppe was a prominent lawyer and Cilea originally intended to follow his father into a law career. He gave an early indication of an aptitude for music when at the age of four he heard a performance of Vincenzo Bellini's Norma and was greatly affected by it.

He was sent to study music at the Conservatorio di San Pietro a Majella in Naples under the guidance of Beniamino Cesi, he distinguished himself through diligence and precocious talent, earning a gold medal from the Ministry of Public Education and being appointed 'first student instructor'.

In 1889, for his final examination at the end of his course of study, he submitted his opera Gina, with a libretto by Enrico Golisciani which was adapted from the old French play Catherine, ou La Croix d'or by Baron Anne-Honoré-Joseph Duveyrier de Mélésville (1787–1865). This "melodramma idilico" was performed in the college theatre, and it attracted the attention of the publishers Sonzogno, who arranged for a second production, in Florence, in 1892.

Sonzogno also then commissioned from Cilea La Tilda, a verismo opera in three short acts along the lines of Mascagni's Cavalleria rusticana. With a libretto by Angelo Zanardini, La Tilda had a successful first performance in April 1892 at the Teatro Pagliano in Florence, and after performances in a number of Italian theatres, it arrived at the Vienna Exhibition on 24 September 1892, alongside other works from the firm of Sonzogno. The composer never showed much sympathy for this work, the subject of which he reluctantly agreed to set to music in order to please Sonzogno and to avoid throwing away a rare professional opportunity. The loss of the orchestral score has prevented the modern revival of this work. However, a new orchestration by musicologist and composer Giancosimo Russo enabled its modern performance in 2025, from which an audio CD was produced.

On 27 November 1897, the Teatro Lirico in Milan saw the première of Cilea's third opera L'Arlesiana, based on the play by Alphonse Daudet, with a libretto by Leopoldo Marenco. Among the cast was the young Enrico Caruso, who performed with great success the Lamento di Federico: È la solita storia del pastore, the romance which was to keep alive the memory of the opera even to the present day. In reality L'Arlesiana was a failure which Cilea, being convinced of the work's value, tried repeatedly to remedy, making drastic and detailed alterations throughout the remainder of his life. In the score which we hear today, it is hard to find a single bar which is completely unchanged from the original. The revised opera was however still not successful, apart from a brief period in the 1930s when it benefited from political support which the composer established through personal contact with Mussolini.

Again at the Teatro Lirico in Milan, on 6 November 1902 and again with Enrico Caruso, the composer won an enthusiastic reception for Adriana Lecouvreur, a 4-act opera with a libretto by Arturo Colautti, set in 18th century Paris and based upon a play by Eugène Scribe. Adriana Lecouvreur is the opera of Cilea which is best known to international audiences today, and it reveals the spontaneity of a melodic style drawn from the Neapolitan school combined with harmonic and tonal shading influenced by French composers such as Massenet.

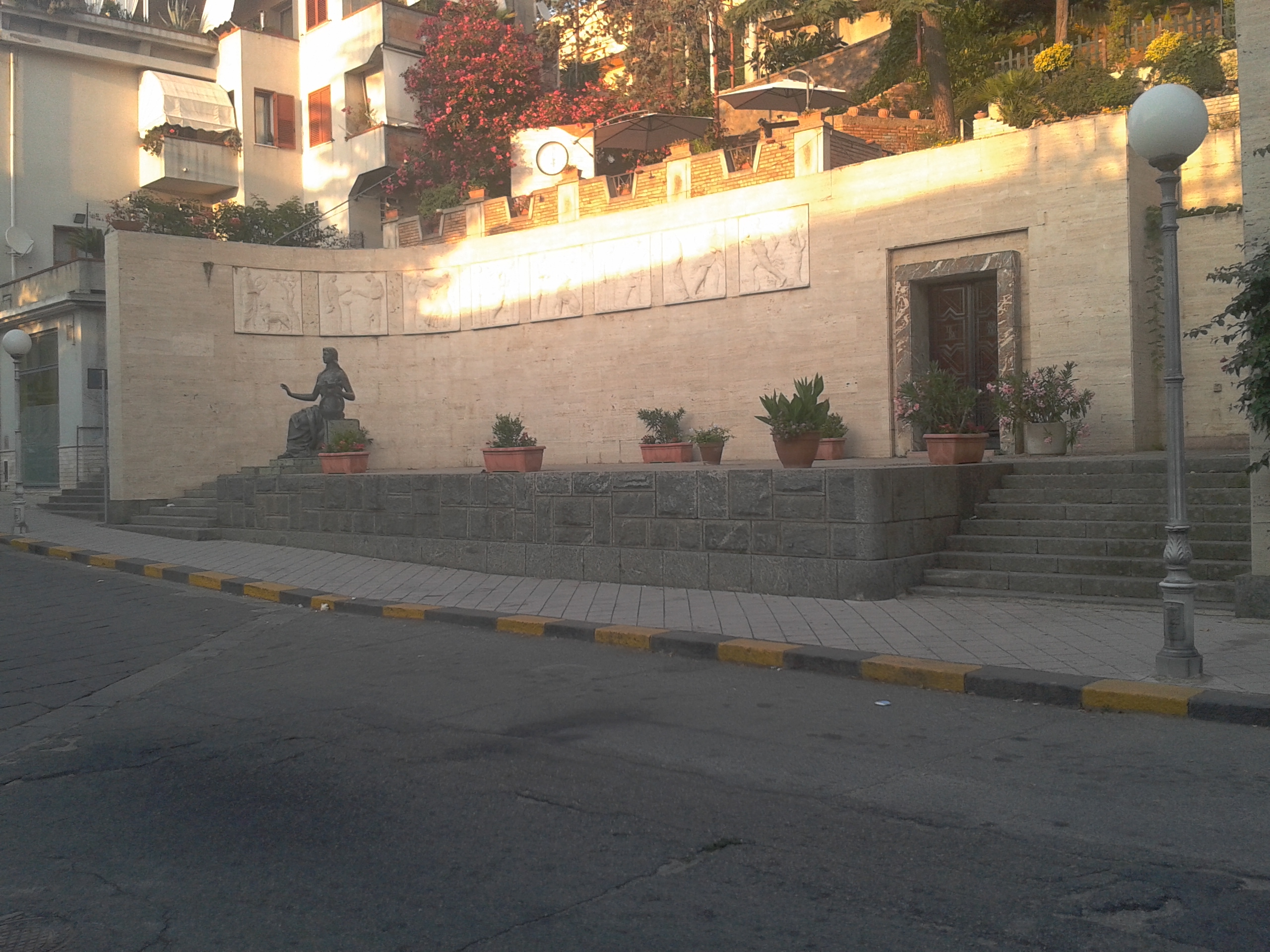
Cilea's mausoleum in Palmi

There are a number of extant examples documenting Cilea's modest skills as a performer. At the piano Cilea accompanied Caruso in a recording of a part of the duet Non piu nobile and made another recording with the baritone De Luca at the same time (November 1902). In 1904, for the Gramophone (and Typewriter Company), he accompanied the tenor Fernando de Lucia in L'Anima ho stanca from Adriana Lecouvreur and in the song Lontananza, an effort which critic Michael Henstock (in his biography of de Lucia) declares is hardly inspired by de Lucia's fine performances. According to Henstock, even given the crude recording techniques of the day Cilea's piano playing seems square and lifeless.

Cilea's last opera, premièred at La Scala in Milan on 15 April 1907 under the baton of Arturo Toscanini, was the 3-act tragedy Gloria, again with a libretto by Colautti, based on a play by Victorien Sardou. The opera was withdrawn after only two performances; and the failure of this work, even though the composer attempted a later revision, was enough to drive him to abandon the operatic stage for good. There are however indications of some later unfulfilled operatic projects, which survive as parts or sketches of libretti, such as Il ritorno dell'amore by Renato Simoni, Malena by Ettore Moschino, and La rosa di Pompei, also by Moschino (dated "Naples, 20 May 1924"). Some sources also refer to an opera of 1909, completed but never performed, called Il matrimonio selvaggio, but no copy of this survives and Cilea himself made no mention of it in his volumes of memoirs ("Ricordi").

Nevertheless, he continued to compose chamber music, and some orchestral music. In 1913 he produced a symphonic poem in honour of Giuseppe Verdi with verses by Sem Benelli, which was first performed at the Teatro Carlo Felice in Genoa. After this he devoted himself principally to education and became director of the Conservatorio Vincenzo Bellini in Palermo, and then at his alma mater, the Conservatorio San Pietro a Maiella in Naples, where he ended his teaching career in 1936.

In his last years Cilea's eyesight failed but his mind was active enough to encourage and work with singers of the day. Among his last musical activities was his championship of the soprano Magda Olivero (1910–2014), whose performances in the title role of Adriana Lecouvreur he especially admired.

Cilea died on 20 November 1950 in Varazze, a town near Savona in Liguria, which offered him honorary citizenship and where he spent the last years of his life. The Conservatorio di Musica and the Teatro Comunale of Reggio di Calabria were renamed in his memory, and his native town of Palmi built a mausoleum in his memory in 1962, decorated with scenes from the myth of Orpheus.

=== Personal life ===
Cilea married Donna Rosa Lavarello in Varazze on 26 June 1909.

== Works ==
Operas

- Gina (February 1889 Teatro Conservatorio S. Pietro alla Majella, Naples)
- La Tilda (April 1892 Teatro Pagliano, Florence)
- L'Arlesiana (November 1897 Teatro Lirico, Milan)
  - first revision (October 1898 Milan)
  - second revision (1910)
  - third revision (1937)
- Adriana Lecouvreur (November 1902 Teatro Lirico, Milan)
- Gloria (April 1907 Teatro alla Scala, Milan)
  - revision (1932)

Other works

- Foglio d'album, Op. 41
- Gocce di rugiada
- L'arcolaio
- Melodia (F major)
- Symphonic Poem in honour of Giuseppe Verdi
- Romanza (A major)
- Sonata for cello and piano in D major, Op. 38 (1888)
- Waltz in D♭ major

Voice and piano

- Romanza, text by Giuseppe Florio (1883)
- Litania I, text from Litany of Loreto (1887)
- Litania II, text from Litany of Loreto (1887)
- Bionda larva, text by Enrico Golisciani (1888)
- Serenata (L'aere imbruna), text by Giuseppe Pessina
- Il mio canto, text by Angelo Bignotti
- Serenata (Mormorante di tenero desio), text by P. Joe
- Non ti voglio amar?..., text by Giuseppe Pessina (1890)
- Alba novella, text by Leopoldo Marenco (1897)
- Lontananza!, text by Romeo Carugati (I version 1904; II version 1944)
- Mazurka, text by A. Villa (1904)
- Nel ridestarmi, text by Felice Soffrè (1921)
- Vita breve (Una lettera), text by Annie Vivanti (1921–1923)
- Maria-Mare, text by Carmelo Pujia (1933)
- Ninnananna popolare savoiarda, text transcribed by Giorgio Nataletti (1934)
- Salute, o genti umane affaticate!, text by Giosuè Carducci (I version 1934; II version 1943)
- Dolce amor di Povertade, text by Anonymous, (1943)
- Statuit ei Dominus, text from Wisdom of Sirach - Bible (1943)
- Tre vocalizzi da concerto (1928)
  1. Gaiezza
  2. Dolore
  3. Festosità
- Tre vocalizzi (1930)
  1. Voce Grave
  2. Voce Media
  3. Voce Acuta

== Bibliography ==
- WQXR Classical Music Scene: Entry in Grove Concise Dictionary, 1988
- Raffaello De Rensis (2016). Francesco Cilea. Rome: NeoClassica. ISBN 978-88-9374-007-4.
- La dolcissima effigie. Studi su Francesco Cilea edited by Gaetano Pitarresi (Reggio Calabria: Laruffa, 1994), (reprinted 1999).
- Francesco Cilea. Documenti e immagini, edited by Maria Grande (Reggio Calabria: Laruffa, 2001). ISBN 88-7221-172-7
- Francesco Cilea e il suo tempo. Atti del Convegno Internazionale di Studi (Palmi-Reggio Calabria, 20–22 ottobre 2000), edited by Gaetano Pitarresi (Reggio Calabria: Edizioni del Conservatorio di Musica "F. Cilea", 2002)
- Francesco Cilea: Composizioni vocali da camera/Vocal Chamber Music, edited by Giuseppe Filianoti (Milano:Ricordi, 2016), ISMN 9790041413846
- Giancosimo Russo, L'Arlesiana di Cilea dall'ipotesto all'opera, Roma, Aracne, 2018, ISBN 978-88-255-1765-1
- Giancosimo Russo, L'unico raggio di sole. "La Tilda" di Cilea agli albori del verismo, Treviso, Diastema, 2023, ISBN 979-12-80270-28-3
- Henstock, Michael (1990). Fernando de Lucia. Gerald Duckworth & Co Ltd. ISBN 978-0715623251.
