= Höstkväll =

Song by Jean Sibelius (1903)

- Art song by Jean Sibelius
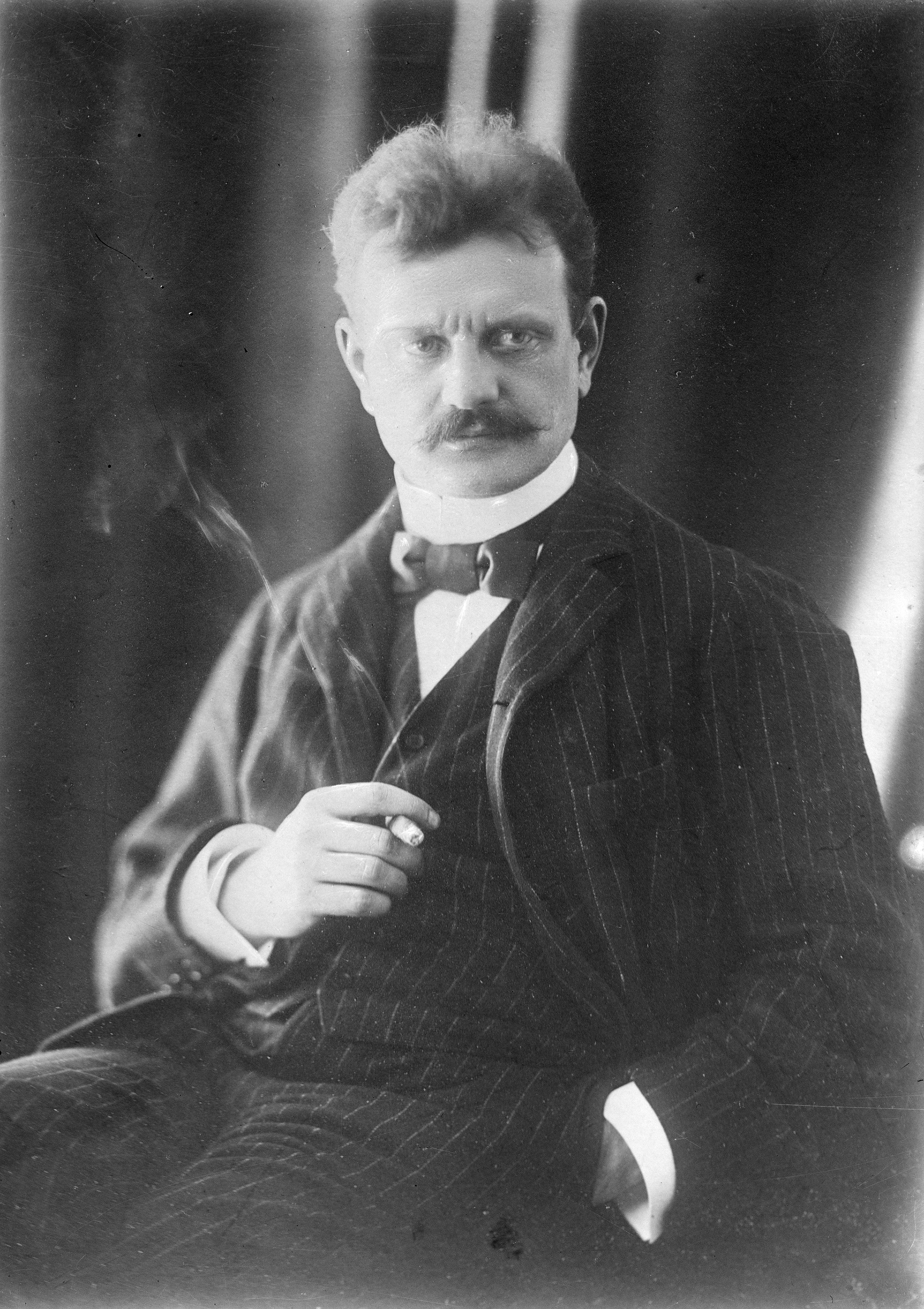
- The composer (c. 1902)
- Opus: 38/1
- Text: Höstkväll by Rydberg
- Language: Swedish
- Composed: 1903, orch. 1904
- Publisher: Fazer & Westerlund (1903; pf.) (Note: On 20 July 1905, the Helsinki-based music publisher Fazer & Westerlund (Helsingfors Nya Musikhandel) sold its Sibelius holdings (the publishing rights and printing plates) to the German firm of Breitkopf & Härtel.); Breitkopf & Härtel (1907; orch.)
- Duration: 4.25 mins.

Premiere
- Date: 12 September 1903
- Location: Helsinki, Grand Duchy of Finland
- Performers: Aino Ackté (soprano); Oskar Merikanto (pianist)

"Höstkväll" (literal English translation: "Autumn Evening"), (Note: Because Sibelius's Op. 38/1 song is sung in Swedish, this article gives preference to its native title, rather than the English translation.) Op. 38/1, (Note: "Höstkväll" is the first of the Op. 38 Five Songs, which is a collection of independent songs rather than a song cycle. The other four songs are as follows: No. 2 På verandan vid havet ("On a Balcony by the Sea", 1903; text by Rydberg), No. 3 I natten ("In the Night", 1903; Rydberg), No. 4 Harpolekaren och hans son ("The Harper and His Son", 1904; Rydberg), and No. 5 Jag ville, jag core i Indialand ("I Wish I were in India", 1904; Gustaf Fröding).) is an art song for vocal soloist (typically soprano) and piano written in 1903 by the Finnish composer Jean Sibelius. The piece, which is a setting of the eponymous poem by the Swedish poet Viktor Rydberg, (Note: The Op. 38/1 "Höstkväll" was Sibelius's second attempt at setting the Rydberg's poem. A fragmentary earlier attempt (HUL 1180, 1888–1889), which is extant, dates to the composer's youth and thematically is unrelated to its identically-named successor.) premiered on 12 September 1903 at the Finnish National Theatre in Helsinki, with the Finnish soprano Aino Ackté as soloist accompanied by the Finnish composer Oskar Merikanto on piano.

In 1904, Sibelius arranged "Höstkväll" for voice and orchestra—along with its catalogue mates, "På verandan vid havet" ("On a Balcony by the Sea", Op. 38/2) and "I natten" ("In the Night", Op. 38/3). This version of the song received its first performance on 14 January 1905 in Paris, with Alfred Cortot conducting; the soloist was the American soprano Minnie Tracey.

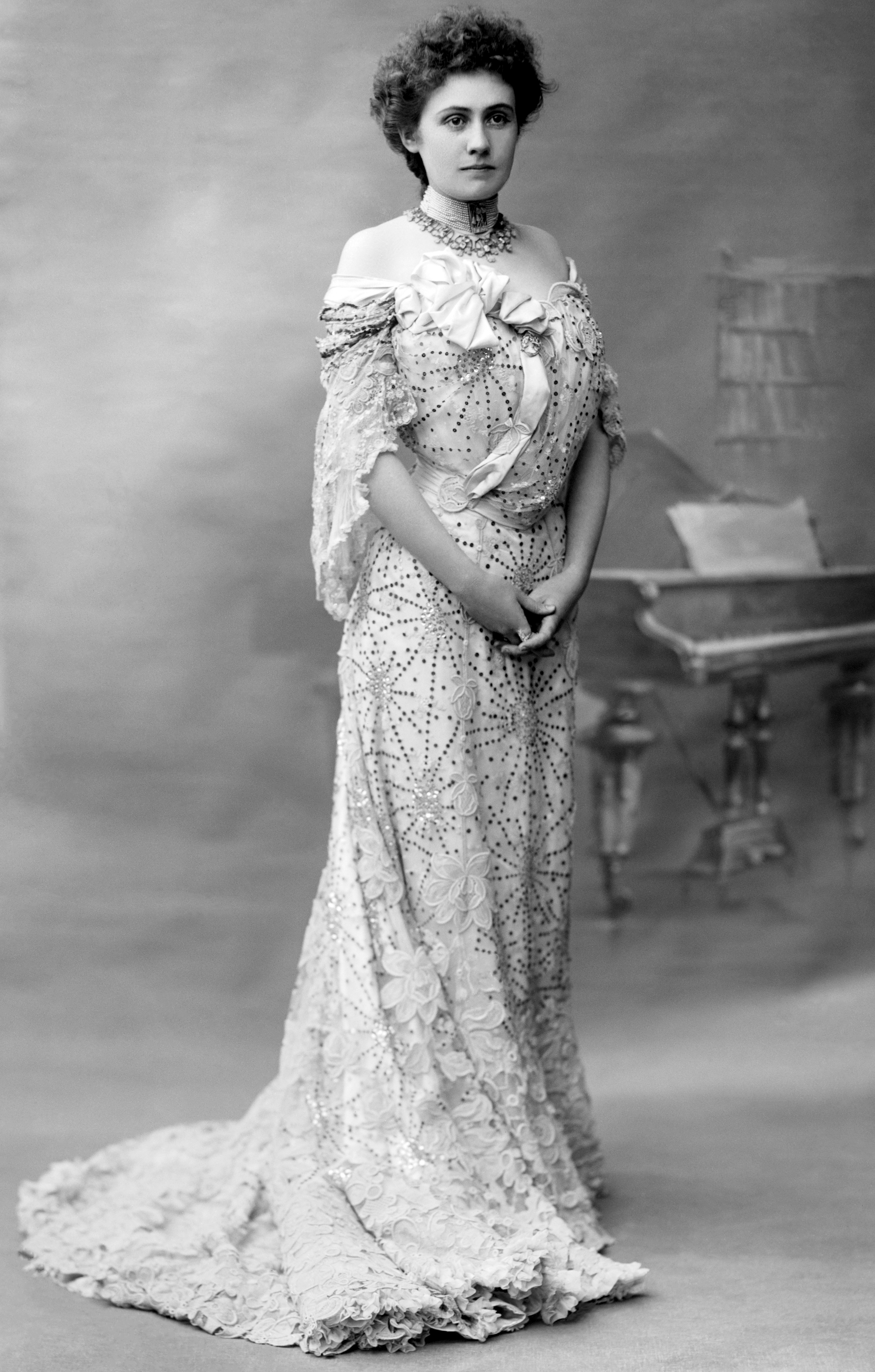
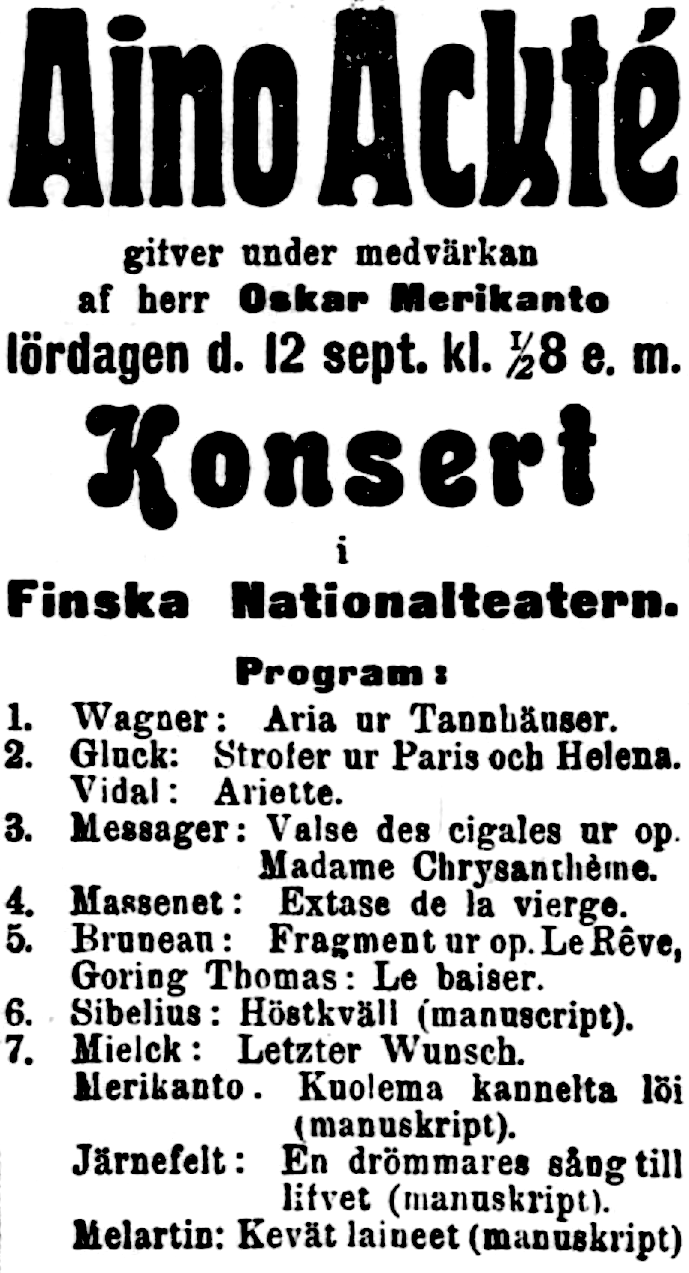
The Finnish soprano Aino Ackté (left) premiered Sibelius's "Höstkväll" on 12 September 1903 in Helsinki (ad right).

== Instrumentation ==
The orchestrated version of "Höstkväll" is scored for the following instruments and voices, organized by family (vocalists, woodwinds, brass, percussion, and strings):

- Soprano (or baritone)
- 2 oboes, 2 clarinets, 2 bassoons, and 1 contrabassoon
- 4 horns and 3 trombones
- Snare drum
- Violins (I and II), violas, cellos, double basses, and harp

== Reception ==
The British musicologist Robert Layton has praised "Höstkväll" as "astonishingly forward-looking" and it is routinely celebrated as being among Sibelius's best songs.

== Discography ==
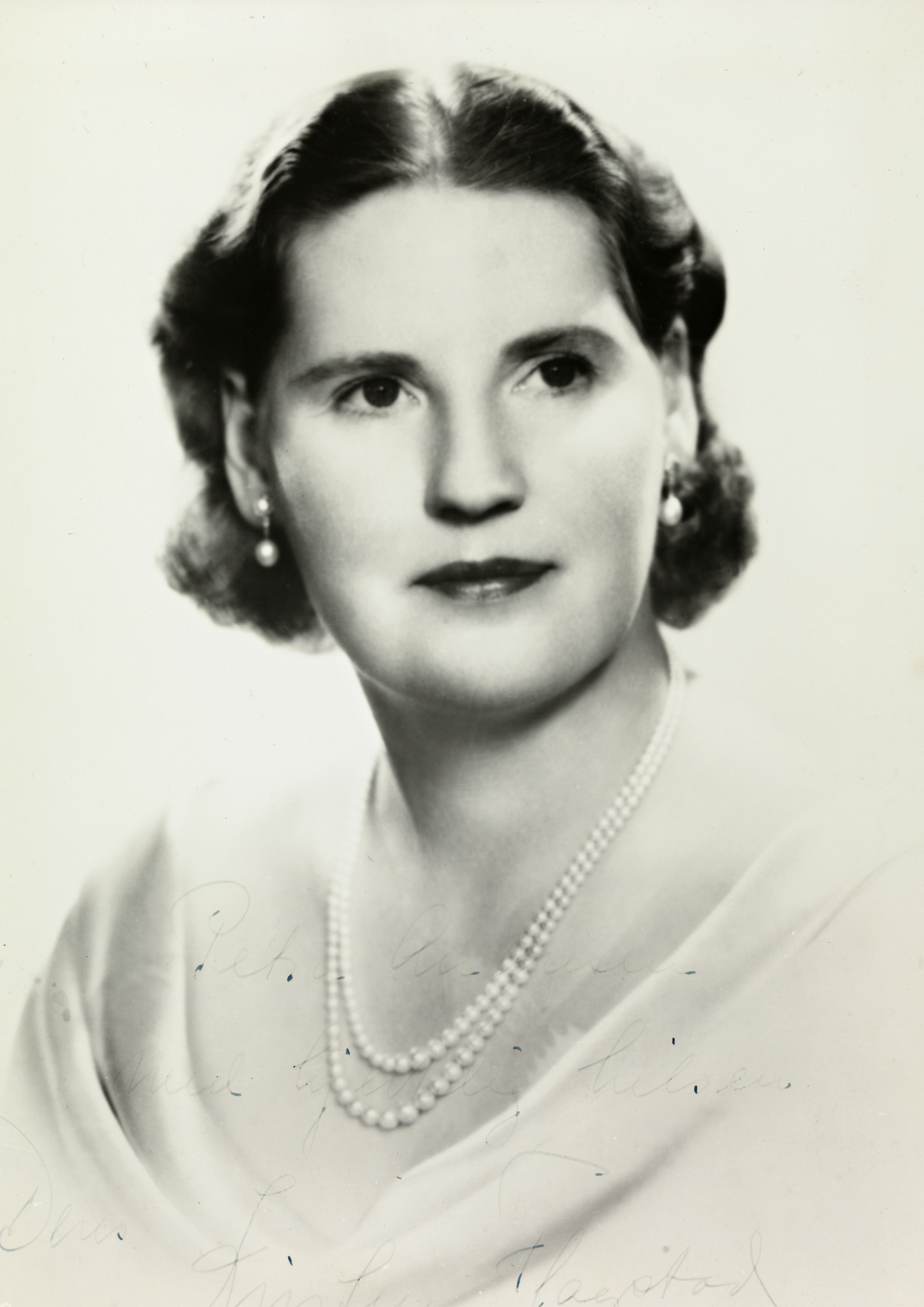
The Norwegian soprano Kirsten Flagstad made the world premiere recording of "Höstkväll" in 1958.

The Norwegian conductor Øivin Fjeldstad and the London Symphony Orchestra, joined by the Norwegian soprano Kirsten Flagstad, made the world premiere studio recording of "Höstkväll" in 1958 for Decca. The table below lists this and other commercially available recordings of the version for orchestra:

No.	Soloist	Conductor	Orchestra	Rec. (Note: Refers to the year in which the performers recorded the work; this may not be the same as the year in which the recording was first released to the general public.)	Time	Recording venue	Label	Ref.
1	Kirsten Flagstad	Øivin Fjeldstad	London Symphony Orchestra	1958	5:29	Kingsway Hall	Decca	(Note: K. Flagstad—Decca (00028947888239) 2015)
2	Birgit Nilsson	Bertil Bokstedt	Vienna Opera Orchestra	1965	5:14	Sofiensaal	Decca	(Note: B. Nilsson—Decca(SXL 6185) 1965)
3	MariAnne Häggander	Jorma Panula	Gothenburg Symphony Orchestra	1984	4:29	Gothenburg Concert Hall	BIS	(Note: M. Häggander—BIS (CD–270) 1984)
4	Karita Mattila	Sakari Oramo	City of Birmingham Symphony Orchestra	2001	5:16	Symphony Hall, Birmingham	Warner Classics	(Note: K. Mattila—Warner Classics (8573 80243–2) 2004)
†	Helena Juntunen (1)	Osmo Vänskä	Lahti Symphony Orchestra	2005	4:55	Sibelius Hall	BIS	(Note: H. Juntunen—BIS (CD–1565) 2006)
5	Soile Isokoski	Leif Segerstam	Helsinki Philharmonic Orchestra	2005	4:54	Finlandia Hall	Ondine	(Note: S. Isokoski—Ondine (ODE 1080–5) 2006)
6	Marianne Beate Kielland	Petr Popelka	Norwegian Radio Orchestra	2021	4:31	NRK Radio Concert Hall	LAWO Classics	(Note: M. Kielland—LAWO Classics (LWC 1239) 2022)

† = version for vocal soloist and string orchestra (1904)

The version of "Höstkväll" for piano accompaniment received its first studio recording in 1967, when the Finnish baritone Tom Krause and the Finnish pianist Pentti Koskimies recorded it for Decca. The table below includes this and other commercially available recordings:

No.	Soloist	Pianist	Rec.	Time	Recording venue	Label	Ref.
1	Tom Krause (1)	Pentti Koskimies	1967	4:11	Kingsway Hall	Decca Eloquence	(Note: T. Krause—Decca Eloquence (442 9447) 2007)
2	Tom Krause (2)	Irwin Gage	1981	4:00	Kingsway Hall	Decca	(Note: T. Krause—Decca (00028947886150) 2015)
3	Tom Krause (3)	Gustav Djupsjöbacka	1993	3:55	Järvenpää Hall	Finlandia	(Note: T. Krause—Finlandia (4509–96871–2) 1994)
4	Kirsi Tiihonen	Satu Salminen	2000	4:44	Martinas Culture Hall	Naxos	(Note: K. Tiihonen—Naxos (8.555274 FIN) 2001)
5	Helena Juntunen (2)	Folke Gräsbeck	2008	4:44	Kuusankoskitalo	BIS	(Note: H. Juntunen—BIS (CD–1918/20) 2008)
6	Hanna Kronqvist	Ilmari Räikkönen	2013	4:34	Kangasala Church	NoteStandRecords	(Note: H. Kronqvist—NoteStandRecords (NS1305) 2013)

== Notes, references, and sources ==
=== Sources ===
- Barnett, Andrew (2007). Sibelius. New Haven, Connecticut: Yale University Press. ISBN 978-0-300-16397-1.
- Dahlström, Fabian [in Swedish] (2003). Jean Sibelius: Thematisch-bibliographisches Verzeichnis seiner Werke [Jean Sibelius: A Thematic Bibliographic Index of His Works] (in German). Wiesbaden: Breitkopf & Härtel. ISBN 3-7651-0333-0.
- Layton, Robert (1993) [1965]. Sibelius. (The Master Musicians Series) (4th ed.). New York: Schirmer Books. ISBN 0028713222.
