= L'arlesiana =

Italian opera

- Opera by Francesco Cilea
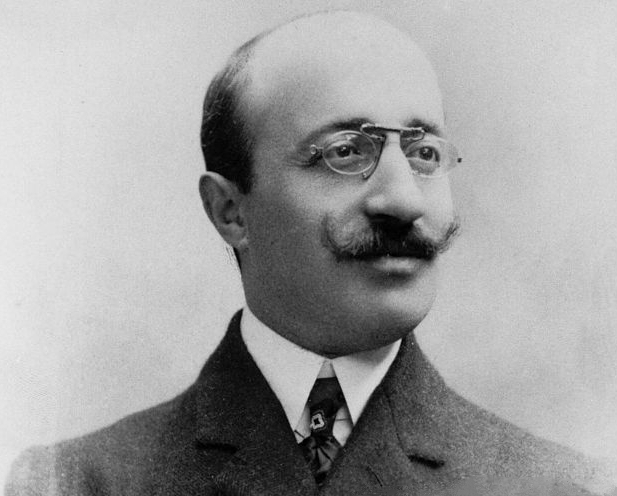
- Cilea c. 1910
- Librettist: Leopoldo Marenco
- Language: Italian
- Based on: Alphonse Daudet's L'Arlésienne
- Premiere: 27 November 1897; Teatro Lirico, Milan

L'arlesiana (Italian pronunciation: [larleˈzjaːna]) is an opera in three acts by Francesco Cilea to an Italian libretto by Leopoldo Marenco. It was originally written in four acts, and was first performed on 27 November 1897 at the Teatro Lirico in Milan. It was revised as a three-act opera in 1898, and a prelude was added in 1937.

The opera is based on the play L'Arlésienne (1872) by Alphonse Daudet, which was itself inspired by a short story from his collection Letters From My Windmill (Lettres de mon moulin) and is best known for the incidental music composed by Georges Bizet.

Three famous arias from this opera are the "Lamento di Federico: È la solita storia del pastore" written for a tenor, "Come due tizzi accesi" for a baritone, and for a mezzo-soprano, "Esser madre è un inferno". Additionally, in 2011, the aria "Una mattina" from the 4-act version was added to the present score by the publisher.

== Performance history ==
In 2007, research at the Università degli Studi di Pavia placed the aria "Alba novella" ("Una mattina") in the first version of L'arlesiana. The aria had been cut from the work after the premiere. Cilea did not want to reinsert it in the ensuing years, and it was subsequently forgotten. The Italian tenor Giuseppe Filianoti brought this aria to the attention of Casa Sonzogno and urged them to reinstate it. They commissioned the Italian composer Mario Guido Scappucci to re-orchestrate the aria, and it was performed for the first time since the opera's premiere in concerts and recordings with the Philharmonisches Orchester Freiburg in July 2012. The original Act III, scene 4 aria was included in its first staged performance with the Wexford Festival Opera in October 2012.

== Roles ==
Roles, voice types, premiere cast
Role	Voice type	Premiere cast, 27 November 1897 Conductor: Giovanni Zuccani
Federico, madly in love with a woman from Arles (referred to as l'Arlesiana)	tenor	Enrico Caruso
Vivetta, in love with Federico	soprano	Matilde Ricci-De Paz
Rosa Mamai, Federico's mother	mezzo-soprano	Minnie Tracey
L'Innocente, Federico's young brother	mezzo-soprano	Clotilde Orlando
Marco, Federico's uncle	bass	Giuseppe Frigiotti
Baldassare, an old shepherd	baritone	Lelio Casini
Metifio, a drover	baritone	Mario Aristidi

== Synopsis ==
=== Act 1 ===
An old shepherd Baldassarre, tells a story to l'Innocente (a younger son of Rosa Mamai) about a little goat fighting with a hungry wolf all night long ("Come due tizzi accesi"). At the break of dawn the goat collapses and dies. L'Innocente is slightly developmentally delayed and rumour has it that the child brings good fortune to the household. L'Innocente is neglected by everyone in the family except Baldassarre.

Rosa Mamai is worried about her older son, Federico, who is madly in love with a woman from Arles. She asks her brother, Marco, to gather some information about this unknown woman.

Vivetta arrives at the farmhouse. She has always loved Federico but she feels hurt knowing of Federico's obsession for l'Arlesiana. As Rosa and Vivetta are talking, she sees L'Innocente up on the edge of the window. Baldassarre pulls the child back, and Rosa shudders, "If anyone should ever fall from that height!" Federico enters, and shortly afterward, Marco returns with news from Arles. Marco says Rosa has no choice but to consent to the marriage plans.

While Baldassarre is at the farmyard, he is approached by Metifio, who asks to speak to Rosa. Metifio tells Rosa that he is l'Arlesiana's lover and the girl's parents are aware of their relationship but rejected him when the prospect of marriage with Federico arose. He shows Rosa and Baldassarre two letters to prove his statements. When Metfio leaves, Federico enters. His mother shows him the letters and asks him to read them. Federico is devastated over the treachery of the woman he loves.

=== Act 2 ===
Rosa and Vivetta search for Federico in the countryside. He has disappeared from home since the previous day. Rosa counsels Vivetta to behave more seductively with Federico and to distract him from thoughts of l'Arlesiana. Baldassarre and l'Innocente enter.

L'Innocente discovers Federico has been hiding in the sheepfold. Baldassarre urges Federico to forget his sorrow by helping him with work ("Vieni con me sui monti"). After Baldassarre has gone, Federico pulls out the letters and contemplates them bitterly. L'Innocente falls asleep while repeating a line from the old shepherd's story about the goat, and that leads into Federico's lament ("È la solita storia del pastore").

Vivetta enters and awkwardly tries to follow Rosa's advice as to how to seduce Federico. She tells him that she loves him but Federico rejects her. Vivetta sobs and draws Rosa into the scene. Rosa offers her consent to his marriage with l'Arlesiana. Federico is moved by his mother's offer but he refuses, swearing that he will only give his name to a woman worthy of it. He calls for Vivetta and asks her to help him to forget about the woman he loves.

=== Act 3 ===
With preparations for Federico and Vivetta's wedding beginning, Federico affirms that he now only thinks of Vivetta. Metifio enters and runs into Baldassarre. He asks him to return his letters, but Baldassarre says he had delivered the letters to Metifio's father. However, Metifio had not yet received them because he was in Arles. Metifio reveals his plans to kidnap l'Arlesiana. Federico overhears the conversation and is overcome with his old jealousy. Vivetta pleads with him to move on and go with her.

Baldassarre advises Metifio not to ruin his life for the unworthy woman. In a rage, Federico attempts to assault Metifio with a sledgehammer but they are separated by Baldassarre and Rosa. When the situation has calmed down, Rosa remains alone and laments the trials of motherhood ("Esser madre è un inferno"). L'Innocente awakes and tells his mother that she can go along to bed. He says he will keep watch over his brother. Rosa kisses him and caresses him as she never has before, but she sends him back to bed.

Federico is half-delirious, repeating the last lines of the shepherd's story about the goat fighting with the wolf all night and falling dead at the break of dawn. He pictures how l' Arlesiana is being carried away on Metifio's horse. Rosa runs to him as Federico heads for the hayloft. He believes he hears l'Arlesiana's cries and, as his mother tries to stop him, he climbs up to the hayloft and jumps out of the window.

== Recordings ==
- L'arlesiana – Ferruccio Tagliavini, Pia Tassinari, Paolo Silveri, Gianna Galli – Coro e Orchestra della RAI Torino, Arturo Basile – Cetra (1951) Membran reissue
- L'Arlesiana - Peter Kelen, Barry Anderson, Balasz Poka, Katalin Halmai, Elena Zilio, Maria Spacagna - Hungarian State Chorus and Orchestra, Charles Rosenkranz - EMI (1992)
- L'arlesiana – Giuseppe Filianoti, Iano Tamar, Francesco Landolfi, Mirela Bunoaica – Opernchor des Theater Freiburg, Fribourg Philharmonic Orchestra, Fabrice Bollon – CPO: 7778052 (2014)
- L'arlesiana – Dmitry Golovnin, Annunziata Vestri, Stefano Antonucci, Mariangela Sicilia – Coro Lirico Marchigiano "V. Bellini", Orchestra Filarmonica Marchigiana, Francesco Cilluffo – Dynamic (2015)
