= Facile =

Studio album by Mina
- Released: 30 October 2009
- Genre: Pop; rock
- Length: 54:51
- Language: Italian
- Label: PDU
- Producer: Massimiliano Pani

Mina chronology
Sulla tua bocca lo dirò (2009)	Facile (2009)	Caramella (2010)

Professional ratings
Review scores
Source	Rating
AllMusic	3.5/5 stars

Facile is a studio album by Italian singer Mina, released on 30 October 2009 by PDU.

== Background ==
Facile is the first album of unreleased material after the Spanish album Todavia and the album Sulla tua bocca lo dirò. For this album, Mina choose both known and unknown writers and the album moves within different musical genres, from rock underground Italian (Afterhours, Boost Subsonica) to R&B (Andrea Mingardi) to pop (Malgioglio).

The album opens with the track Vida loca, a cover of a Cuban singer Francisco Cespedes. The initial idea of using the track came from Axel Pani. In his relentless pursuit of music he was impressed by the song in Spanish. When he discovered that an Italian translation exists by Cristiano Malgioglio, he immediately proposed that his grandmother record the Italian version. Mina agreed and at her request, Malgioglio changed some verses of the translation. This album marks the beginning of a new phase of collaboration between Malgioglio and Mina. They had previously collaborated on the track L'importante è finire in 1975, which was a great success. Their last collaboration was on the album Finalmente ho conosciuto il conte Dracula... in 1985.

After his debut as a writer with the track Per poco che sia from Mina’s album (Bau, 2006), Axel Pani composed two songs on this album. Con o senza te is one of his first compositions in collaboration with Matthias Gysi. The song was composed in English and translated into Italian by Lele Cerri. The third song Volpi nei pollai (Foxes in the henhouse) is an ironic metaphor of infidelity. In this track Mina confirms the legend that even unknown songwriters can have their songs recorded. The writers are not composers or lyricists by profession. Gianni Bindi owns a hardware store and Matthew Mancini is a lawyer who deals with disabilities, but they do know how to write intriguing songs.

Andrea Mingardi, who along with Maurizio Tirelli, composed four tracks for this album (Ma tu mi ami ancora?; Non si butta via niente; Più del tartufo sulle uova; Eccitanti conflitti confusi), after having composed six tracks for Mina’s album Bau in 2006. Although Mingardi wrote new material specifically for this album, Mina reimagines the track Eccitanti conflitti confusi and gives it new meaning.

Adesso è facile is a highlight of the album. It is a collaboration Mina and the major alternative rock group in Italy called Afterhours. They had work together on the album (Leggera in 1997) on the track Tre volte dentro. Mina’s daughter Benedetta Mazzini is a fan of the group and personal friend of the leader Manuel Agnelli. Agnelli initially planned to write a track with the typical sounds of Afterhours but for the range of Mina’s voice. It was Mina who later came to the idea to sing the song as a duet. Benedetta had the idea of promoting the song with a video and the video featuring Manuel and Benedetta was shot in Rome in mid-November 2009 by the director Cosimo Alemà. The video was released on 4 December 2009 and began rotation on MTV and other music channels.

Carne viva was written by Cristiano Malgioglio during his participation in the reality show L'isola dei famosi in 2007. Malgioglio has stated that he wrote the track specifically for Mina. The lyrics was then set to music by Corrado Castellari who has been collaborating with Malgioglio for many years.

Ma c'è tempo is another song written by fairly unknown composers. One of the three authors, Stefano Cenci composed Brivido feline (Mina Celentano, 1998), while Luca Angelosanti and Francesco Morettini composed tracks for Viola Valentino's album, I tacchi di Giada in 2009.

Non ti voglio più is composed by David Dileo. He is known as Boost and is the keyboardist and founder of the group Subsonica. This track sees Mina’s foray into Italian Underground music. Boosta decided to send his songs to Mina and she chose this.

Il frutto che vuoi, music by Alex Pani and lyrics by Maurizio Morante, was the lead single chosen by Sony and released on the radio on 9 October 2009. Concurrent with this release, an alternative take of the track was available on Mina’s official website. This track was the unmixed and first draft of the track before.

After the last track Eccitanti conflitti confusi there is a hidden track that contains a different version of the track Questa vita loca with the voice of Mina reworked to the computer and a long tail of music.

== Track listing ==
No.	Title	Writer(s)	Length
1.	"Questa vita loca (Vida loca)"	Francisco Cespedes, Cristiano Malgioglio	3:52
2.	"Con o senza te"	Samuele Cerri, Axel Pani, Mattia Gysi	3:28
3.	"Volpi nei pollai"	Matteo Mancini, Gianni Bindi	4:09
4.	"Ma tu mi ami ancora?"	Andrea Mingardi, Maurizio Tirelli	4:20
5.	"Non si butta via niente"	Andrea Mingardi, Maurizio Tirelli	4:14
6.	"Adesso è facile - (Afterhours)"	Manuel Agnelli	3:49
7.	"Carne viva"	Cristiano Malgioglio, Corrado Castellari	4:18
8.	"Ma c'è tempo"	Luca Angelosanti, Francesco Morettini, Stefano Cenci	4:19
9.	"Non ti voglio più"	Davide Dileo	4:55
10.	"Il frutto che vuoi"	Axel Pani, Maurizio Morante	3:13
11.	"Più del tartufo sulle uova"	Andrea Mingardi, Maurizio Tirelli	5:14
12.	"Eccitanti conflitti confusi"	Andrea Mingardi, Maurizio Tirelli	3:46
13.	"Questa vita loca (Vida loca) (version II - ghost track)"	Francisco Cespedes, Cristiano Malgioglio	4:33

== Charts ==
=== Weekly charts ===
Weekly chart performance for Facile
Chart (2009)	Peak position
Italian Albums (FIMI)	5

=== Year-end charts ===
Year-end chart performance for Facile
Chart (2009)	Position
Italian Albums (FIMI)	69

== Certifications and sales ==
Certifications for Facile
Region	Certification	Certified units/sales
Italy (FIMI)	Gold	35,000^{*}
^{*} Sales figures based on certification alone.
