= Caramella =

Studio album by Mina
- Released: 25 May 2010
- Recorded: 2003–2010
- Studios: Studi GSU, Lugano
- Genre: Pop
- Length: 69:09
- Languages: Italian; English
- Labels: PDU; Sony
- Producer: Massimiliano Pani

Mina chronology
| Facile (2009) | Caramella (2010) | Piccola Strenna (2010) |

Singles from Caramella
- 1. "You Get Me" Released: 29 April 2010

Caramella is a studio album by Italian singer Mina, released by PDU and Sony Music on 25 May 2010.

== Overview ==
Published only seven months after her previous album Facile, and two months after her 70th birthday, this album is one of diverse sounds, styles, and authors. It includes fourteen tracks (plus one ghost track) written by numerous authors. In addition to the single "You Get Me", sung as a duet with English singer Seal, there are also songs "Pocte parole", a duet with Giorgia from the 2007 album Stonata and "Amore desperato", a duet with Lucio Dalla from the 2003 album Lucio.

== Commercial performance ==
The album debuted at the third position of the Italian chart, it lasted 35 weeks on the chart and became the 57th best-selling album of 2010. The album also received a gold certification from FIMI for sales of 30,000 copies.

== Critical reception ==
Professional ratings
Review scores
| Source | Rating |
|---|---|
| AllMusic | 4/5 stars |

According to Mariano Prunes from AllMusic, Caramella is less daring among Mina's recent releases, which included an opera album and some flirtations with alternative rock, but perhaps because of this it is the most impressive, since Mina is clearly on her own territory here–in the field of modern adult contemporary ballads in the Italian style. Claudio Milano of OndaRock stated that "You Get Me" is a wonderful modern adult pop music with perfect arrangements, but otherwise there is often a discord between vocals, songs and production.

== Track listing ==
| No. | Title | Writer(s) | Producer(s) | Length |
|---|---|---|---|---|
| 1. | "You Get Me" (with Seal) | Pam Sheyne; Teitur Lassen | Massimiliano Pani; David Foster | 4:52 |
| 2. | "Io e te" | Paolo Benvegnù; Andrea Franchi; Gionni Dall'Orto | Pani | 4:56 |
| 3. | "Il povero e il re" | Axel Pani | Pani | 4:35 |
| 4. | "Poche parole" (with Giorgia) | Giorgia Todrani; Emanuel Lo | Giorgia; Pani | 4:06 |
| 5. | "Amore disperato" (with Lucio Dalla) | Beppe D'Onghia; Dalla; Roberto Costa | Pani | 4:28 |
| 6. | "Così così" | Samuele Cerri; Massimo Moriconi | Pani | 5:17 |
| 7. | "Solo se sai rispondere" | Massimiliano Casacci | Ale Bavo; Casacci | 3:58 |
| 8. | "Come se io fossi lì" | Mauro Santoro | Pani | 3:46 |
| 9. | "La clessidra" | Davide Dileo | Dileo | 4:22 |
| 10. | "Accendi questa luce" | Andrea Mingardi; Maurizio Tirelli | Pani | 4:32 |
| 11. | "Amoreunicoamore" | Fabrizio Berlincioni; Silvio Amato | Pani | 4:02 |
| 12. | "Ma comme faje" | Maurizio Morante | Pani | 4:18 |
| 13. | "Inutile sperare" | Morante; Massimo Culotta | Pani | 4:29 |
| 14. | "Mi piacerebbe andare al mare" | Andrea Mingardi; Tirelli | Pani | 11:28 |
| Total length: | | | | 69:09 |

Notes

- Track 14 contains a hidden track, Mina's solo version of "You Get Me".

== Charts ==
=== Weekly charts ===
Weekly chart performance for Caramella
| Chart (2010) | Peak position |
|---|---|
| Greek Albums (IFPI) | 6 |
| Italian Albums (FIMI) | 3 |

=== Year-end charts ===
Year-end chart performance for Caramella
| Chart (2010) | Position |
|---|---|
| Italian Albums (FIMI) | 57 |

== Certifications and sales ==
Certifications for Caramella
| Region | Certification | Certified units/sales |
|---|---|---|
| Italy (FIMI) | Gold | 30,000^{*} |
^{*} Sales figures based on certification alone.
