= È la solita storia del pastore =

Italian aria

"È la solita storia del pastore" , also known as "Lamento di Federico", is an aria from act 2 of the opera L'arlesiana (1897) by Francesco Cilea. It is sung by Federico (tenor), who is deeply in love with a girl from Arles, the Arlesiana of the title, but his family has arranged his marriage with Vivetta. Vivetta has always loved Federico since childhood and is disappointed to know of his love for l'Arlesiana. When he has been left alone, Federico reads the letters of l'Arlesiana (which prove she has another lover) and ponders them with his broken heart.

== Libretto ==
Leopoldo Marenco wrote the Italian libretto.

È la solita storia del pastore...
Il povero ragazzo voleva raccontarla
E s'addormì.
C'è nel sonno l'oblio.
Come l'invidio!
Anch'io vorrei dormir così,
nel sonno almen l'oblio trovar!
La pace sol cercando io vo'.
Vorrei poter tutto scordar!
Ma ogni sforzo è vano.
Davanti ho sempre di lei
il dolce sembiante.
La pace tolta è solo a me.
Perché degg'io tanto penar?
Lei! Sempre lei mi parla al cor!
Fatale vision, mi lascia!
Mi fai tanto male! Ahimè!

It's the old tale of the shepherd...
The poor boy wanted to retell it
And he fell asleep.
There is oblivion in sleep.
How I envy him!
I too would like to sleep like that
To find oblivion at least in slumber!
I am searching only for peace.
I would like to be able to forget everything!
Yet every effort is in vain.
Before me I always have
her sweet face.
Peace is ever taken from me.
Why must I suffer so very much?
She, as always speaks to my heart.
Fatal vision, leave me!
You hurt me so deeply! Alas!
