= La Haine (drama) =

Drama by Victorien Sardou

La Haine (Hatred) is a drama in five acts and eight tableaux by Victorien Sardou, premiered at the Théâtre de la Gaîté in Paris on 3 December 1874. Jacques Offenbach, director of the theatre, composed extensive incidental music for chorus and orchestra to accompany the play.

== Background ==
Offenbach had composed songs and incidental music for eleven classical and modern dramas for the Comédie Française in the early 1850s, gaining valuable experience in writing for the theatre. Sardou and Offenbach created their first joint work in 1872 with the opéra-bouffe-féerie Le Roi Carotte, which ran for 195 performances, and this encouraged the two to renew their collaboration.

By 1874, Jacques Offenbach had become the director of the Théâtre de la Gaîté. To follow a revival of Orphée aux Enfers on 7 February, he decided to mount Sardou's drame using the under-used theatrical troupe at the theatre.

=== Rehearsal ===
Orphée aux Enfers closed on the 18 November to allow the rehearsals for La Haine to start, directed by Sardou himself who did not spare his efforts. Le Figaro reported that "Sardou is the most meticulous director in the world" and that he "places particular importance on the extras being actively involved as much as any of the actors." Rehearsals increased and the dress rehearsal took place on 27 November.

The premiere was announced for the 29 November, but was postponed on the day itself, due to the flu epidemic in the capital which indisposed two principal actors, Lafontaine et Clément Just. First of all it was postponed until 30 November but only took place on Thursday 3 December, but as the actors had not completely recovered, Sardou cut the final scene.

=== Reception ===
The premiere audience marvelled at the magnificence of the production. The scenery was especially dazzling. Francisque Sarcey noted "It is only right to recognize that, of the décors, several are masterpieces of exquisite taste; the cathedral dome is a marvel of lightness and grave; the inside of the church is superb."

Everything was done to dazzle : dramatist and composer went so far as to transport a Cavaillé-Coll organ into the theatre. The settings were grand and impressive: the stage accommodated 535 persons.: "The war-cries of the soldiers, the moans of the terrified women, the clanking of armour, the booming of guns, the conquerors' entrance in the city, the sacking of the palace, all was of an exact and admirable motion."

The words of Victorien Sardou were also noted, but critics commented that the direction was rather against the drama. Francisque Sarcey regretted that the principal roles appeared crushed : "The supernumeraries and props are too prominent. The crowd is the principal character. Tableaux follow tableaux, and in this new work, they are equally dark."

For Auguste Vitu the play evoked painful memories of 1870 : "Streets full of bodies, palaces in flames, the homeland forsaken in the presence of the dumbfounded foreigner, and as if scandalized by so many distractions, such are the unforgettable sights which our consciousness is still soured, and of which our hearts still bleed. The widows and orphans in black, I have seen them bowed in our churches, the air rent with their sobs. The door of deathly memory re-opens wide within us; and sadness envelops us with its great black wings."

While receipts came to around 8,000 francs per performance in mid-December, they fell to around 5,000 francs during the second fortnight On 28 December Le Figaro printed a letter from Sardou requesting that Offenbach recall his piece from the stage; Offenbach replied that as the public prefer lively art he would bring back Orphée. The announcement had the effect of filling the theatre for the last performances of La Haine. After 27 performances the play closed on 29 December 1874 and Orphée aux Enfers was brought back. The short run left the theatre in a parlous financial position. Some costumes were used in the revised version of Geneviève de Brabant which opened on 25 February 1875.

Despite the failure, Sardou and Offenbach did contemplate a further collaboration on a spectacular production of the playwright's Don Quichotte.

A modern performance with reduced text but complete score took place on 19 July 2009 at the Festival de Radio France et Montpellier Languedoc Roussillon, with Fanny Ardant and Gérard Depardieu playing Cordelia and Orso. The concert was broadcast on France Musique on 30 July 2009.

== Pictures from the original production ==
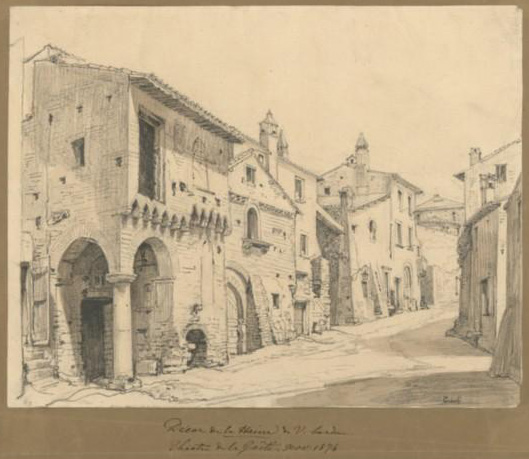
Scenery sketch for La Haine

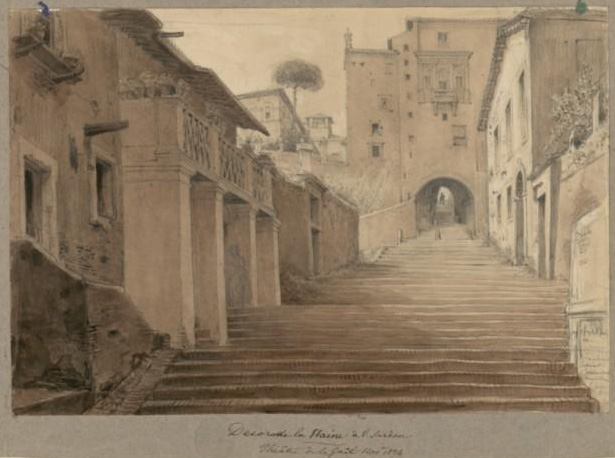
Scenery sketch for La Haine

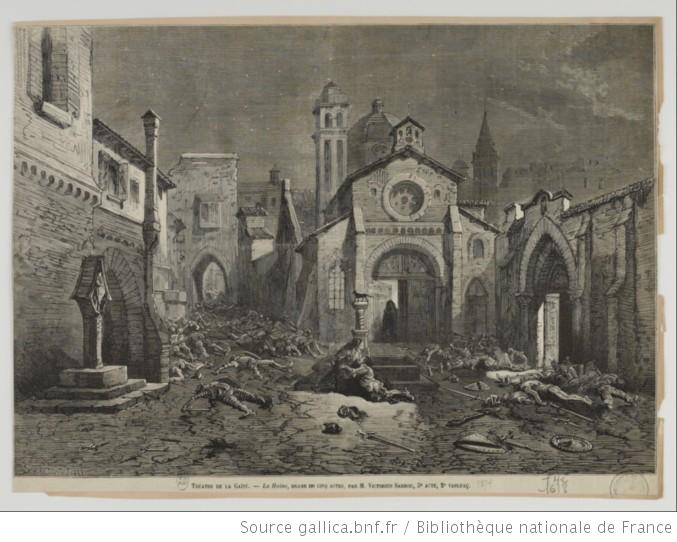
Scene from Act III of La Haine

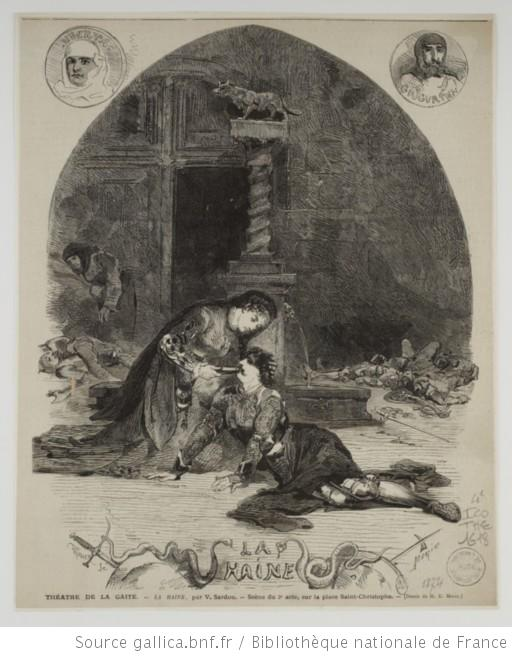
Orso and Cordélia, Act III, tableau 2, scene II

== First cast ==
| ORSO | | MM. | Lafontaine |
| GIUGURTA SARACINI | | | Clément-Just |
| ERCOLE, his frère | | | Reynald |
| LODRISIO MARISCOTTI | | | Angelo |
| AZZOLINO, Bishop of Sienna | | | Dugaril |
| BRAGUELLA, merchant | | | Courcelles |
| MALERBA | } Guelph chiefs | | Scipion |
| SPLENDIANO | } Guelph chiefs | | J. Vizentini |
| UGONE | } Guelph chiefs | | Antonin |
| SOZZINI | } Ghibelline chiefs | | Sudrac |
| PICCOLOMINI | } Ghibelline chiefs | | Alexandre fils |
| TOLOMEI | } Ghibelline chiefs | | Bilhaut |
| MALAVOLTI | } Ghibelline chiefs | | Henri |
| BUONOCORSO | } Guelph soldiers | | Galli |
| ZANINO | } Guelph soldiers | | Barsagol |
| SCARLONE | } Guelph soldiers | | Chevallier |
| MASTINO | | | Gaspard |
| LE LOMBARD | | | Henri |
| LE PÉROUSIEN | | | Barsagol |
| LE FLORENTIN | | | Meyronnet |
| LE LUCQUOIS | | | Colleuille |
| LE BOLONAIS | | | Mallet |
| LE PISAN | | | Gaspard |
| CRISTOFORO | | | Paulin |
| UN CHANOINE | | | Seligny |
| UN MOINE | | | Bilhaut |
| CORDELIA, sister of Giugurta and Ercole Saracini | | | Lia Félix |
| UBERTA, her nurse | | | Laurence Grivot |
| ANDREINO, son of Uberta, 15 years old | | | Marie Godin |
| PORCIA | | | Angèle |

== Music ==
In 2006 the autograph orchestral score of the incidental music was found in the archive of the Offenbach family. Some early sketches preserved in the Archives Historiques de la ville de Cologne were destroyed in an accident on 3 March 2009. Jean-Christophe Keck, responsible for the 2009 critical edition, commented that "Offenbach composed a rich score of 30 numbers. The first sketches were noted down while travelling in his barouche where he had set up a work-table - the manuscripts bear witness to the jumping pen as it rode over Parisian cobbles. It consists of many mélodrames, off-stage choruses, interludes...".

During Offenbach's tour of the US, he conducted with much success the Marche religieuse from La Haine for American audiences.

Keck notes that just before he died, Offenbach recalled the opening of the overture to La Haine in the opening bars of the finale of the Venetian act from Contes d'Hoffmann.

| Number | Title | Tempo | Cue words | Notes |
|---|---|---|---|---|
ACT I
| Nº 1 | Introduction | Allegro maestoso |
| Nº 2 | | Moderato | Je suis seule ici, je n'ai que lui, laisse le moi ! (Scène IV) |
| Nº 3 | | Allegro | Leads from N°2 | On-stage fanfare |
| Nº 4 | | | [A l'assaut !] Victoire ! à nous la ville ! (Scène XI) |
ACT II — Premier Tableau
| Nº 5 | Entracte | Agitato |
| Nº 6 | | Allegro moderato | Au moindre soupçon de trahison ! C'est dit ! Allez ! (Scène II) |
| Nº 7 | | Andante | Ah ! Je me meurs ! (Scène IV) | Cut in performance and included in Nº 8 |
| Nº 8 | Close of Premier Tableau | Andante |
ACT II — Deuxième Tableau
| Nº 9 | Entracte | Allegro Maestoso | | Repeat cut at the premiere. |
| Nº 10 | | Andante | L'enfant descend avec l'Évangile ouvert. (Scène I) |
| Nº 11 | Sponsa Dei | [Andante] | Qu'il le soit ! (Scène II) | 2 versions of several bars |
ACT III — Premier Tableau
| Nº 12 | | [Allegro marziale] |
| Nº 12 bis | Douce Madone | Andantino |
| Nº 13 | | | Le marché ne tient plus, tu es trop lâche ! (Scène II) |
| Nº 13 bis | | Allegretto | Du courage, chrétienne, et au revoir. (Scène III) |
| Nº 13 ter | | Allegro | Vous, à vos postes, sans bruit. Allez ! (Scène VI) |
| Nº 14 | | Moderato | Après les cloches. |
| Nº 14 bis | | Allegro | Leads from N°14 |
ACTE III — Deuxième Tableau
| Nº 15 | | Andante | Viens, je ne recommencerai pas ce que j'ai fait. (Scène X du Premier Tableau) |
| Nº 16 | | Allegro | J'ai prié pour toi. (Scène II) | 2 versions of several bars |
ACTE IV — Premier Tableau
| Nº 17 | | Moderato |
| Nº 18 | | Andante | Il le faut. Viens [Giugurta] (Scène IV) |
| Nº 19 | | Allegro | Va combattre la guerre. (Scène V) |
ACT IV — Deuxième Tableau
| Nº 20 | | Agitato |
| Nº 21 | [Promenade des reliques] | Moderato |
| Nº 22 A | | Lento | Leads from N°21 | First version abandoned |
| N° 22 B | | Andante | Leads from N°21 | Final version |
| [Nº 22 bis] | Marche religieuse | [Allegro marziale] |
| Nº 23 |
ACT V
| Nº 24 | Entracte | Allegro |
| Nº 25 | | Andantino |
| Nº 25 bis | | Andante | Leads from N°25 |
| Nº 26 | | Moderato | … à la porte romaine nos troupes victorieuses. (Scène II) | This number does not occur in Sardou's play. |
| Nº 27 | | Moderato | Madone, sauve-moi ! (Scène III) |
| Nº 26 bis | Petite Marche | Maestoso |
| Nº 28 | Gloire au vainqueur | Orchestre tacet |
| Nº 29 | | Orchestre tacet |
| Nº 30 A | | | Et maintenant, mort, quand tu voudras ! (Scène VII) | First version abandoned |
| Nº 30 B | | | | Final version |
SUPPLÉMENT
| Nº 28 | | | | First version abandoned |

== Synopsis ==
The action takes place in Siena in 1369. Historically, the Republic of Siena has passed through much civil unrest and political upheavals at that period, and in general Siena tended to be Ghibelline, in opposition to Florence's Guelph position. The play's specific events and its main characters are, however, fictional.

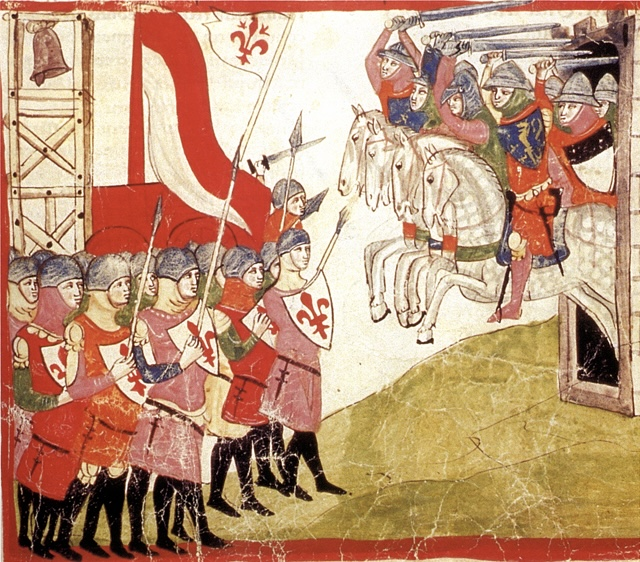
A miniature depicting the Battle of Montaperti, from the Nuova Cronica (14th century)

In the 13th century, (this conflict formed the backdrop for some of Dante Alighieri's Divine Comedy, completed in 1320).

=== Act I ===
A crossroads near the rue Camollia. On the outskirts of Sienna, the banned Guelphs and the reigning Ghibellines fight. The Guelphs are led by Orso who had been banished for having dared to throw a garland to the Ghibelline Cordelia Saracini. From the battle the guelfes emerge victorious at the portcullis of the Saracini palace. Orso demands that Cordelia appear at the balcony and open the gates to the town. Cordelia replies to him: « … now is not the time to open the gates, when thieves are in the town! » Orso give orders for an assault, the gate rises and he enters the Saracini palace bent on vengeance. Rather than throw Cordelia from the window as the screaming crowd demands, he drags her half-strangled back into the palace.

=== Act II ===
Premier tableau – a great hall in the Seigniory palace. Despite their apparent victory, the Guelphs only control but half of the city. Among the dead on the Ghibelline side is Andreino, the fifteen-year-old son of Uberta, Cordelia's old nurse. The Guelphs request a truce in order to tend to the injured and bury the dead : plague is feared. The Saracini palace is on fire. Cordelia comes back, alive, but tells her brothers Ercole and Giugurta, as well as her nurse, that she has been raped by a man of whom all she can remember is the voice.

Deuxième tableau – the cathedral square. Guelphs and Ghibellines attend the solemn mass for the Virgin in the cathedral. At the point of coming to blows, the Bishop Azzolino steps forward and upbraids them : « Siennois, is this what you call a truce for the Virgin ? Church is God's house alone ! – Faithless and unworthy Christians put your weapons down or I will close these doors and will open them only to admit your coffins! » They defer in the face of the threat; Orso only speaking a word but it is enough for Cordelia to recognize as she follows the men into the church.

=== Act III ===
Premier tableau – a cloister. While Cordelia recognizes Orso as her torturer, Uberta learns by chance that the killer of her son is also Orso ! The two women argue over which should kill him. Cordelia decides with her plea : « You only mourn a death; I, I mourn myself, alive! ». Cordelia strikes Orso, and he falls to the ground, his throat cut with a dagger thrust. As a fight ensues, his men carry him, still breathing, to the shade of a church porch. When Cordelia and Uberta retrace steps to finish their vengeance, they cannot find the body and wonder if he was only injured. Cordelia cries out : « God of vengeance ! let him be dead ! I will not finish the task ! ».

Deuxième tableau – the square. Cordelia discovers Orso in agony and pleading for a drink. Faced with this suffering, she pities him and pours fresh water on his lips.

=== Act IV ===
Premier tableau – a room in the Saracini palace. Cordelia has concealed Orso in the burnt palace. Giugurta, beaten, must flee the town. He wants to leave the palace by the gardens but to do that must pass through the room where Orso is hiding, convalescent. Cordelia puts him off with such insistence that Uberta becomes suspicious. A horrific explanation finally reveals the truth to Uberta, but Cordelia asks for mercy in the name of Andreino who would have condemned this bloody sacrifice. Cordelia and Orso find themselves alone. Two images alternate in the mind of Orso : the woman who stabbed him and the woman who saved him. The two make one victim of him; his repentance bursts forth and to restore her honour he asks to marry her. Cordelia replies that he is also guilty to his country riven by war. Orso promises her : « You will see me again when I have triumphed over discord and vanquished hatred! » He leaves the palace and it is announced that Giugurta has been arrested by the Guelphs, masters of the city.

Deuxième tableau – ruins of the old Seigniory palace. The captured Ghibelline prisoners including Giurgurta are about to be executed. Orso enters and proposes to the people that the prisoners be freed, in order to march against the Emperor laying siege to the city and demanding 50,000 florins to lift the siege. The people accept. As they set off for battle Giugurta catches a glance and words from Cordelia to Orso, and says that he will return and question her after the battle.

=== Act V ===
Sienna cathedral. The Siennese return victorious. Cordelia, frightened by her brother's threats has taken refuge in the cathedral. Giugurta find her there having extracted the information before killing Uberta. After proud protests, Cordelia faints on the altar steps, and he takes advantage to make her swallow poison. The victors come in with Orso at their head. Cordelia has convulsions which are mistaken for the plague. The crowd disperses in horror, and Orso takes Cordelia in his arms. So doing, he condemns himself to be trapped with her in the place tainted by the plague. At their pleas, Azollino joins them in marriage. Alone, they exchange parting words : Orso's wound has re-opened, and the two lovers die side by side.

== Notes and references ==
- Full text of La Haine in French
