= Five Songs, Op. 37 (Sibelius) =

Collection of art songs by Jean Sibelius (1900–1902)

- Song collection by Jean Sibelius
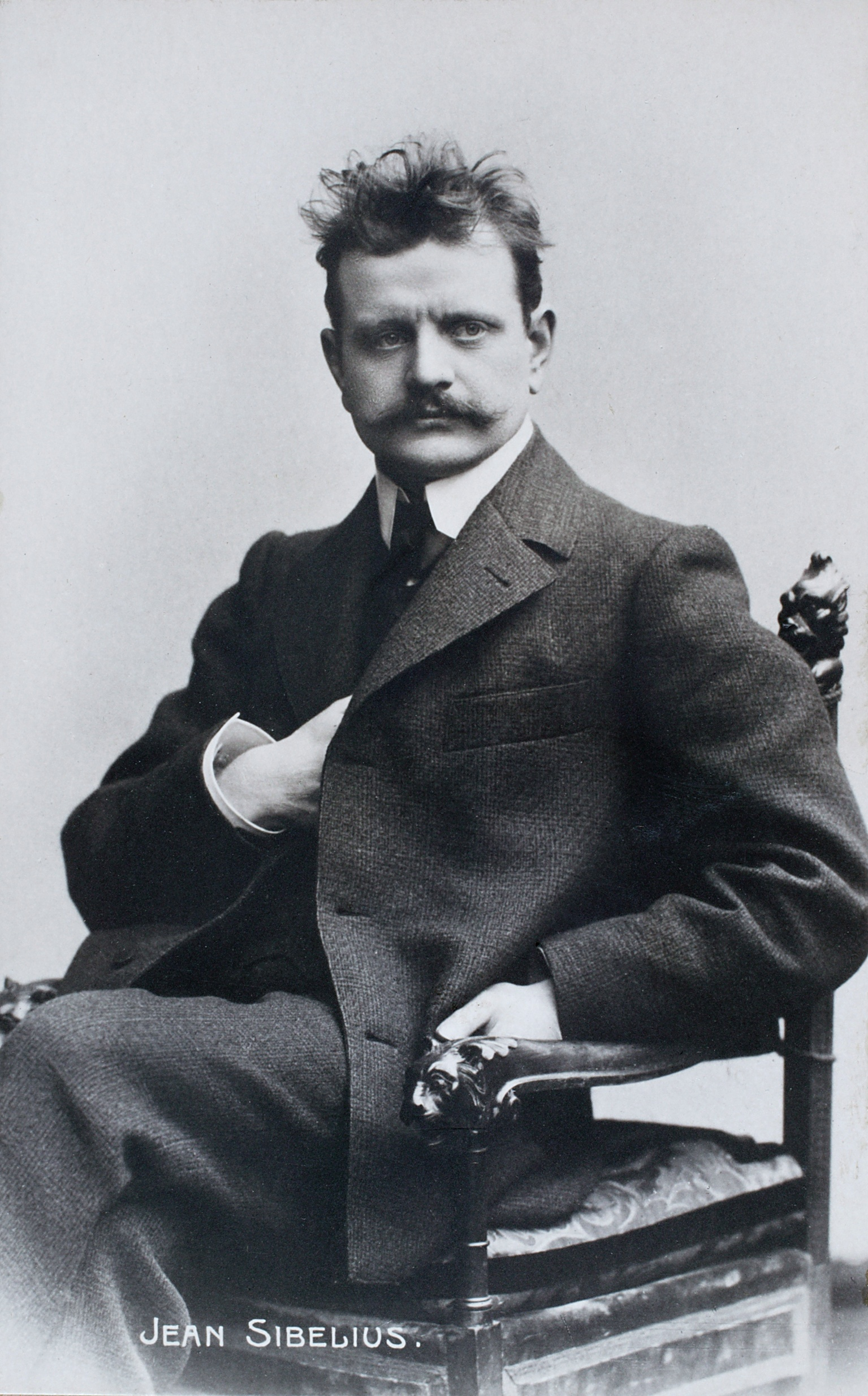
- The composer (c. 1900)
- Opus: 37
- Language: Swedish
- Composed: 1900–1902; No. 3 orch. 1913

External audio
- Sung by Anne Sofie von Otter, accompanied by Bengt Forsberg
- No. 1, "Den första kyssen"
- No. 2, "Lasse liten"
- No. 3, "Soluppgång"
- No. 4, "Var det en dröm?"
- No. 5, "Flickan kom ifrån sun älsklings möte"

The Five Songs, Op. 37, (Note: Because Sibelius's Op. 37 songs are sung in Swedish, this article gives preference to each song's native title, rather than the English translation.) is a collection of Swedish-language art songs for vocal soloist and piano written from 1900 to 1902 by the Finnish composer Jean Sibelius. (Note: All but a few of Sibelius's songs are settings of Swedish-language poems (quantitatively, his favorite poets were Ernst Josephson, Johan Ludvig Runeberg, Viktor Rydberg, and Karl August Tavaststjerna) and are with piano accompaniment. While many are of high quality, they largely have been neglected outside the Nordic realm, due to the limited coverage (in terms of number of speakers) of Swedish (relative to, for example, German or French).)

== Constituent songs ==
Ordered by catalogue number, the Op. 37 songs are as follows:

- "Den första kyssen" ("The First Kiss"), Op. 37/1 (1900); text by the Finnish poet Johan Ludvig Runeberg
- "Lasse liten" ("Little Lasse"), Op. 37/2 (1902); text by the Finnish poet Zachris Topelius
- "Soluppgång" ("Sunrise"), Op. 37/3 (1902); text by the Swedish poet Tor Hedberg (Note: A preliminary/alternative version of "Soluppgång" ("Sunrise") is extant; its catalogue designation is JS 87.)
- "Var det en dröm?" ("Was It a Dream?"), Op. 37/4 (1902); text by the Finnish poet Josef Julius Wecksell
- "Flickan kom ifrån sin älsklings möte" ("The Girl Returned Home from Meeting Her Lover"), Op. 37/5 (1901); text by Runeberg

The collection was first published by the Helsinki-based firm Fazer & Westerlund (Helsingfors Nya Musikhandel) from 1901 to 1902. The table below provides additional information about song:

Song	Tempo	Time	Key	Premiere				Ref.
Song	Tempo	Time	Key	Soloist	Pianist	Date	Venue	Ref.
No. 1	Andante (ma non-troppo lento)	common time	D-flat major	Adée Leander-Flodin	Karl Flodin	22 November 1900	Solemnity Hall, Helsinki	
No. 2	Andante	cut time	B-flat major	Ida Ekman	Karl Ekman	8 October 1902	Solemnity Hall, Helsinki	
No. 3	Moderato	6/8	G major	Ida Ekman	Karl Ekman	9 October 1902	Solemnity Hall, Helsinki	
No. 4	Moderato	6/4	B major	Ida Ekman	Karl Ekman	9 October 1902	Solemnity Hall, Helsinki	
No. 5	Moderato	common time	D-flat major	Ida Ekman	Karl Ekman	January 1901	Soiree for Otto Lessmann	

=== Orchestral version of No. 3 ===
In 1913, Sibelius arranged "Soluppgång" for vocalist and orchestra.

== Notes, references, and sources ==
=== Sources ===
- Barnett, Andrew (2007). Sibelius. New Haven, Connecticut: Yale University Press. ISBN 978-0-300-16397-1.
- Dahlström, Fabian [in Swedish] (2003). Jean Sibelius: Thematisch-bibliographisches Verzeichnis seiner Werke [Jean Sibelius: A Thematic Bibliographic Index of His Works] (in German). Wiesbaden: Breitkopf & Härtel. ISBN 3-7651-0333-0.
- Layton, Robert (1993) [1965]. Sibelius. (The Master Musicians Series) (4th ed.). New York: Schirmer Books. ISBN 0028713222.
