= Helena Juntunen =

Finnish operatic soprano (born 1976)

Helena Maria Juntunen (born 9 March 1976) is a Finnish operatic soprano.

== Early life ==
She was born in Kiiminki. She trained at the Sibelius Academy in Finland.

== Career ==
She began her career as a soprano at the Savonlinna Opera Festival in Finland. She has sung with the Finnish National Opera.

=== Proms ===
She has sung at The Proms five times.

- Wednesday 15 August 2007 - Sibelius, with the Lahti Symphony Orchestra (Finnish) conducted by Osmo Vänskä, with Lilli Paasikivi
- Sunday 23 August 2009 - Stabat Mater by Karol Szymanowski, with the BBC Symphony Orchestra conducted by Osmo Vänskä, with Monica Groop
- Saturday 28 August 2010 - Symphony No. 9 with Minnesota Orchestra, conducted by Osmo Vänskä (Finnish) and Charlotte Hellekant
- Sunday 4 September 2011 - Missa solemnis with the London Symphony Orchestra
- Tuesday 4 September 2018 - Tango Prom with pianist Pablo Ziegler
