= Minnie Tracey =

American soprano (1873/4–1929

Minnie Tracey (1873 or 1874 – January 29, 1929) was an American high lyric soprano.

== Early years ==
Tracey was born in Albany, New York. She studied music abroad, including three years' training under Belgian operatic soprano Marie Sasse.

== Career ==
In 1890, Tracey debuted in the Geneva Opera House in the role of Marguerite in Faust. She received several curtain calls, and "Her success was unprecedented in the case of a debutante in Geneva." She created roles in some operas written by her friend Jules Massenet, and she sang with Caruso in London. Other cities in which she performed included Bordeaux, Marseilles, Milan, Nice, and Paris.

== Civic contributions ==
While Tracey lived in Cincinnati, she "was a dominant factor in the city's artistic life." Her contributions included arranging a Mozart festival and achieving radio broadcasts of the Cincinnati Symphony Orchestra.

== Death ==
On January 29, 1929, Tracey died at her home in Cincinnati, Ohio, at age 55. The following Sunday, a music column in The Cincinnati Enquirer praised her contributions as a music educator and "impresario of musical events".
