= Mikhail Svetlov (bass) =

Russian bass

Mikhail Svetlov

Mikhail Anatolyevich Svetlov (born Krutikov; Russian: Михаил Анатольевич Светлов) is a Russian bass known for the range and beauty of his voice as well as his acting ability. His voice was described by The Washington Post as a "titanic, all-encompassing bass". He was nominated for a 2003 Grammy Award for a recording of Stravinsky's L'Histoire du soldat and is the first Russian bass ever to perform the title roles in Don Giovanni and Der fliegende Holländer.

== Debut ==
Svetlov studied piano, choral conducting and graduated as a singer from Moscow Conservatory. International career began with a very prestigious and successful debut at the Wexford Festival. Since winning the prestigious Viotti International Competition, praised for his rare technique in the bel canto style, Svetlov was immediately admitted to the permanent troupe of the Bolshoi Theatre, as a principal soloist. Numerous important engagements have included performances with the Bolshoi on their tour at New York's Metropolitan Opera and critically acclaimed debuts at La Scala and Royal Albert Hall in London.

== Recordings and collaborations ==
His recordings of Rachmaninov's The Miserly Knight and Alexander Serov's Judith were honored by the Telerama Awards (French magazine for television, radio and music) in France. He is well known for his performances of Verdi's Requiem throughout the world, including Paris, Moscow, Tokyo, and Montreal. Svetlov performs frequently with Houston Grand Opera, Mephistopheles in Faust, Don Basilio in The Barber of Seville and Dikoy in Káťa Kabanová, with L'Opéra de Montréal, the title role in Boris Godunov, Prince Gremin in Eugene Onegin, with Florida Grand Opera. Svetlov has appeared with New York City Opera as the title role in Verdi's Attilla, Basilio in The Barber of Seville, Colline in La bohème, Banquo in a new production of Macbeth and Lorenz in the first fully staged performance of Mathis der Maler in the United States.

== Roles ==
- Curio (Giulio Cesare)
- Osmin (Die Entführung aus dem Serail)
- Don Giovanni (Don Giovanni)
- Sarastro (Die Zauberflöte)
- Don Basilio (The Barber of Seville)
- Dulcamara (L'elisir d'amore)
- Raimondo (Lucia di Lammermoor)
- Oroveso (Norma)
- Giorgio (I puritani)
- Der Holländer, Daland (Der fliegende Holländer)
- Zaccaria (Nabucco)
- Attila (Attila)
- Banquo (Macbeth)
- Count Walter (Luisa Miller)
- Sparafucile, Monterone (Rigoletto)
- Ferrando (Il trovatore)
- Jacopo Fiesco (Simon Boccanegra)
- Padre Guardiano (La forza del destino)
- Filippo II, Grand Inquisitor (Don Carlo)
- Ramfis, Il Re (Aida)
- Mephistopheles (Faust)
- Igor, Galitsky, Skula, Konchak (Prince Igor)
- Abimelech (Samson et Dalila)
- Boris, Pimen Varlaam (Boris Godunov)
- Dosifey, Khovansky (Khovanshchina)
- Prince Gremin (Eugene Onegin)
- King René (Iolanta)
- Salieri (Mozart and Salieri)
- Sobakin, Malyuta (The Tsar's Bride)
- King Dodon (The Golden Cockerel)
- Savël Prokofjevic Dikój (Káťa Kabanová)
- Colline, Benoi, Alcindoro (La bohème)
- Scarpia (Tosca)
- Timur (Turandot)
- Il Cieco (Iris)
- Aleko, Old Gypsy (Aleko)
- Baron (The Miserly Knight)
- Archibaldo (L'amore dei tre re)
- Bluebeard (Bluebeard's Castle)
- Mendoza (Betrothal in a Monastery)
- Doctor (The Nose)
- Police Inspector (Lady Macbeth of Mtsensk)

== Discography ==
Svetlov's discography includes the world premiere of Rachmaninov's The Miserly Knight and Serov's Judith on Le Chant du Monde, Shostakovich's The Gamblers recorded by Capriccio on Delta Music and Prokofiev's Bethrothal in a Monastery recorded by Melodia on BMG Classics, Shostakovich's 14th Symphony on Virgin Classics, and Grammy nominated in 2003 Stravinsky's L'Histoire du soldat on Koch International Classics, "Russian Songs" (Mighty Five) recorded by Naxos in 2011.
