= Leopoldo Marenco =

Italian dramatic poet

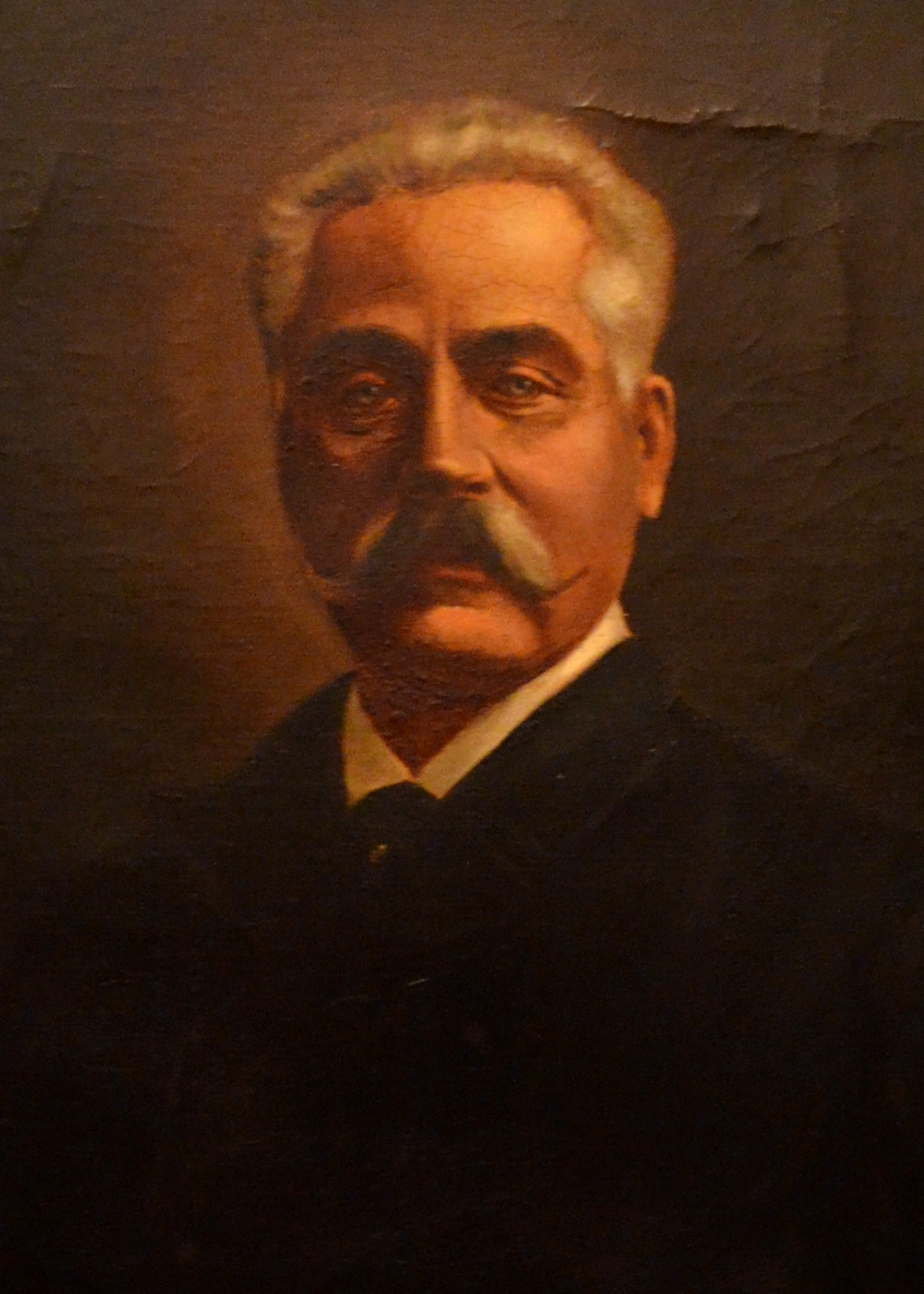
Portrait of Leopoldo Marenco

Leopoldo Marenco (Nov. 8, 1831 – April 30, 1899) was an Italian dramatic poet, now known as a librettist.

== Life ==
Born at Ceva, his father was Carlo Marenco. Like his father he held a government post under the Treasury Department, one which took him to Sardinia.

In 1860 he became professor of Latin literature at Bologna University, and later occupied a similar chair at Milan University. In 1871 he retired to Turin.

== Works ==
His plays in verse, written after 1860, are more notable for their lyrical qualities than for dramatic technique. Among them are:

- Celeste
- Tempeste alpine
- Marcellina
- Il falconiere di Pietra Ardena
- Adelasia
- La famiglia
- Carmela
- Piccarda Donati
- Saffo
- Rosalinda

Subjects from modern and medieval history were treated by him, and he followed his father's example in drawing from Dante.
