= Falstaff discography =

This is a discography of Giuseppe Verdi's last opera, Falstaff. It was first performed at La Scala, Milan, on 9 February 1893.

== Recordings ==
Year	Falstaff Ford Fenton Alice Ford Nannetta Mistress Quickly	Conductor, Opera house and orchestra	Label
1932	Giacomo Rimini; Emilio Ghirardini; Roberto D'Alessio; Pia Tassinari; Ines Alfani-Tellini; Aurora Buades	Lorenzo Molajoli; Teatro alla Scala orchestra & chorus	CD: Naxos Records; Cat: 8110198–99
1937	Mariano Stabile; Dino Borgioli; Piero Biasini; Alfredo Tedeschi; Giuseppe Nessi; Virgilio Lazzari; Franca Somigli; Augusta Oltrabella; Mita Vasari; Angelica Cravcenco	Arturo Toscanini; Wiener Staatsoper; Wiener Philharmoniker	CD: Bongiovanni; Cat: GB 1137/38-2; CD: Arkadia Records; Cat: HP 625.2
1950	Giuseppe Valdengo; Frank Guarrera; Antonio Madasi; Herva Nelli; Teresa Stich-Randall; Cloe Elmo	Arturo Toscanini; NBC Symphony Orchestra; Robert Shaw Chorale (recorded at Carnegie Hall)	CD: RCA; Cat: B00004R8ME
1956	Tito Gobbi; Rolando Panerai; Luigi Alva; Elisabeth Schwarzkopf; Anna Moffo; Fedora Barbieri	Herbert von Karajan; Philharmonia Orchestra; Philharmonia Chorus	CD: EMI Classics; Cat: CDM 5 67083 2
1963	Geraint Evans; Robert Merrill; Alfredo Kraus; Ilva Ligabue; Mirella Freni; Giulietta Simionato	Georg Solti; Teatro dell'Opera di Roma orchestra & chorus	CD: Decca; Cat: B000787WWE
1966	Dietrich Fischer-Dieskau; Rolando Panerai; Juan Oncina; Ilva Ligabue; Graziella Sciutti; Regina Resnik	Leonard Bernstein; Vienna Philharmonic; Vienna State Opera chorus	CD: CBS Masterworks; Cat: 01–042535–10
1976	Donald Gramm; Benjamin Luxon; Max-René Cosotti; Kay Griffel; Elizabeth Gale; Nucci Condò	Sir John Pritchard; London Philharmonic Orchestra; Glyndebourne chorus (recorded at Glyndebourne Festival)	DVD/VHS: Arthaus Musik; Cat: 101 083
1980	Giuseppe Taddei; Rolando Panerai; Francisco Araiza; Raina Kabaivanska; Janet Perry; Christa Ludwig	Herbert von Karajan; Vienna Philharmonic; Vienna State Opera chorus	CD: Philips; Cat: B00000E2SL
1982	Renato Bruson; Leo Nucci; Dalmacio Gonzalez; Katia Ricciarelli; Barbara Hendricks; Lucia Valentini Terrani	Carlo Maria Giulini; Los Angeles Philharmonic; Los Angeles Master chorale	CD: Deutsche Grammophon; Cat: B000001G4L
1991	Rolando Panerai; Alan Titus; Frank Lopardo; Sharon Sweet; Julie Kaufmann; Marilyn Horne	Colin Davis; Bavarian Radio Symphony Orchestra & chorus	CD: RCA Victor; Cat: 09026 60705–2
1996	Domenico Trimarchi; Roberto Servile; Maurizio Comencini; Julia Faulkner; Dilber Yunus; Anna Maria di Micco	Will Humburg; Hungarian State Opera orchestra & chorus	CD: Naxos; Cat: 8660050–1
1998	Jean-Philippe Lafont; Anthony Michaels-Moore; Antonello Palombi; Hillevi Martinpelto; Rebecca Evans; Sara Mingardo	Sir John Eliot Gardiner; Orchestre Révolutionnaire et Romantique; Monteverdi Choir	CD: Phillips; Cat: 462 603–2
2001	Andrew Shore; Ashley Holland; Barry Banks; Yvonne Kenny; Susan Gritton; Rebecca de Pont Davies	Paul Daniel; English National Opera orchestra & chorus (sung in English)	CD: Chandos; Cat:Chandos 3079
	Bryn Terfel; Thomas Hampson; Danil Shtoda; Adrianne Pieczonka; Dorothea Röschmann; Larissa Diadkova	Claudio Abbado; Berlin Philharmonic; Berliner Rundfunkchor	CD: DGG; Cat: 289 471 194–2
2004	Michele Pertusi; Carlos Álvarez; Bülent Bezdüz; Ana Ibarra; Maria Josè Moreno; Jane Henschel	Colin Davis; London Symphony Orchestra; London Symphony Chorus	CD: LSO Live; Cat:LSO0055
2009	Christopher Purves; Tassis Christoyannis; Bülent Bezdüz; Dina Kuznetsova; Adriana Kučerová; Marie-Nicole Lemieux	Vladimir Jurowski; London Philharmonic Orchestra; Glyndebourne chorus (recorded at Glyndebourne Festival)	DVD: Opus Arte; Cat: OA 1021 D
2020	Roberto De Candia, Simone Piazzola, Joel Prieto, Rebecca Evans, Ruth Iniesta, Daniela Barcellona	Daniele Rustioni; Orchestra and chorus of Teatro Real; Laurent Pelly, stage director	DVD: Bel Air Classiques; Cat:BAC177

The "Operadis" discography lists more than seventy other recordings, made at live performances. They include those conducted by Sir Thomas Beecham at the Metropolitan Opera in 1944 with Leonard Warren in the title role; Fritz Reiner with Warren at the Met (1948); Victor de Sabata with Mariano Stabile at La Scala (1951); Karajan and Gobbi at the Salzburg Festival (1957); Tullio Serafin with Gobbi at the Chicago Lyric Opera (1958); Lorin Maazel and Walter Berry at the Vienna State Opera (1983); James Levine and Paul Plishka at the Met (1992); Riccardo Muti and Juan Pons at La Scala (1993); Solti and José van Dam in Berlin (1993); and Zubin Mehta and Ruggero Raimondi at the Teatro Comunale, Florence (2006).

In October 1978 Solti conducted the soundtrack for Götz Friedrich's 1979 film of Falstaff. The recording, made by Decca in the Sofiensaal. Vienna, with the Deutsche Oper Berlin Chorus, the Vienna State Opera Chorus, and the Vienna Philharmonic Orchestra, featured Gabriel Bacquier as Falstaff, Richard Stilwell as Ford, Max-René Cosotti as Fenton, Karan Armstrong as Alice Ford, Jutta-Renate Ihloff as Nanetta and Márta Szirmay as Mistress Quickly.
