= Léopold Simoneau =

Canadian opera singer

Léopold Simoneau CC CQ
- Born: May 3, 1916; Saint-Flavien, Quebec
- Died: August 24, 2006 (aged 90); Victoria, British Columbia
- Occupation: Classical tenor
- Years active: 1941–1970
- Spouse: Pierrette Alarie (m. 1946)

Léopold Simoneau, CC CQ (May 3, 1916 – August 24, 2006) was a French-Canadian tenor, one of the outstanding Mozarteans and interpreters of the French lyric repertoire of his time. In 1959 he became the first recipient of the Calixa-Lavallée Award.

== Life and career ==
Simoneau was born in Saint-Flavien, Quebec, and started his vocal studies in Quebec City at the Collège de Lévis and Université Laval. While studying in Montreal with Salvator Issaurel, he made his professional debut with Les Variétés Lyriques in Montréal in 1941.

He then left for New York City for complementary studies with Paul Althouse. In 1946 he appeared at the New York City Center as Lionel in Martha. That same year he married French-Canadian soprano Pierrette Alarie. Together they left for France.

Simoneau made his debut in 1949 at the Opéra-Comique of Paris as Vincent in Gounod's opera Mireille and at the Paris Opera as Tamino in Mozart's The Magic Flute. He made his debut at the Aix-en-Provence Festival in 1950 singing Don Ottavio in Don Giovanni and Ferrando in Così fan tutte. The following year, he made his debut at the Glyndebourne Festival as Idamante in Idomeneo. He was invited to sing at the Salzburg Festival and the Edinburgh International Festival, at the Vienna State Opera and at La Scala in Milan, while pursuing his career in France in roles such as Nadir in Bizet's Les pêcheurs de perles and Gérald in Delibes' Lakmé. He took part in the revivals of operas such as Rameau's Les Indes galantes and Orphée in the French version for tenor of Gluck's Orfeo ed Euridice. In France he frequently sang opposite his wife, a light lyric coloratura soprano who excelled in much the same repertoire as her husband.

He made several major recordings in the 1950s, including Mozart's Requiem conducted by Bruno Walter; Berlioz's Requiem with the Wiener Staatsopernchor and Wiener Philharmoniker, conducted by Dimitri Mitropoulos; and Handel's Messiah conducted by Hermann Scherchen, about which reviewer Dan Davis wrote that "after hearing Léopold Simoneau you may be spoiled for good, unable to accept another tenor in the part." He can be heard as Don Ottavio both in a studio performance of Don Giovanni under Rudolf Moralt and live at Salzburg under Mitropoulos; about the former, critic Ralph Moore wrote, "Leopold Simoneau's Don Ottavio is a dream: he... has perfect Mozartian legato and is invariably sweet of voice without sounding wimpish." Simoneau also participated in two celebrated recordings for Philips Records, Les pêcheurs de perles conducted by Jean Fournet, and Orphée et Euridyce conducted by Hans Rosbaud, in which he gave what some critics feel are the definitive performances of Nadir and Orphée respectively. Simoneau also sang Belmonte in Sir Thomas Beecham's recording of Mozart's Die Entführung aus dem Serail, and Ferrando in Così fan tutte with Elisabeth Schwarzkopf, Nan Merriman, Rolando Panerai, Lisa Otto, Sesto Bruscantini, conducted by Herbert von Karajan; both albums are considered classics. His performance in Charles Munch's critically acclaimed 1959 recording of the Berlioz Requiem has been called "close to ideal."

Simoneau made his debut at the Lyric Opera of Chicago in 1954, he sang there until 1961j, notably in Verdi's La traviata opposite Maria Callas. His only Metropolitan Opera appearances were five performances of Don Ottavio during the 1963-64 season.

Simoneau's final appearance was in Messiah in Montréal on November 24, 1970. He was made an Officer of the Order of Canada in 1971, he was promoted to Companion in 1995. Simoneau was also made a Knight of the National Order of Quebec in 1997.

After retiring, Simoneau and his wife became active as teachers, notably at the Banff Centre. They also founded the Canada Piccola Opera in Victoria, British Columbia, in 1982. The couple had two daughters, Isabelle and Chantal.

Simoneau died at his home on August 24, 2006, in Victoria, British Columbia, at the age of 90.

== See also ==
- Così fan tutte (Herbert von Karajan recording)

== Sources ==
- Le Dictionnaire des disques et des compacts, Robert Laffont. ISBN 2-221-06682-0
- Alain Pâris, Dictionnaire des interprètes et de l'interpretation musicale au XX siècle (2 vols), Éditions Robert Laffont (Bouquins, Paris 1982, 4th edn. 1995, 5th edn 2004). ISBN 2-221-06660-X
- D. Hamilton (ed.),The Metropolitan Opera Encyclopedia: A Complete Guide to the World of Opera (Simon and Schuster, New York 1987). ISBN 0-671-61732-X
- Roland Mancini and Jean-Jacques Rouveroux, (orig. H. Rosenthal and J. Warrack, French edition), Guide de l’opéra, Les indispensables de la musique (Fayard, 1995). ISBN 2-213-59567-4
