= Franco Calabrese =

Italian bass singer (1923–1992)

Franco Calabrese in Werther, Teatro dell'Opera, Rome (photo with dedication)

Franco Calabrese (22 July 1923 in Palermo – 13 November 1992 in Lucca) was an Italian bass singer.

== Biography ==
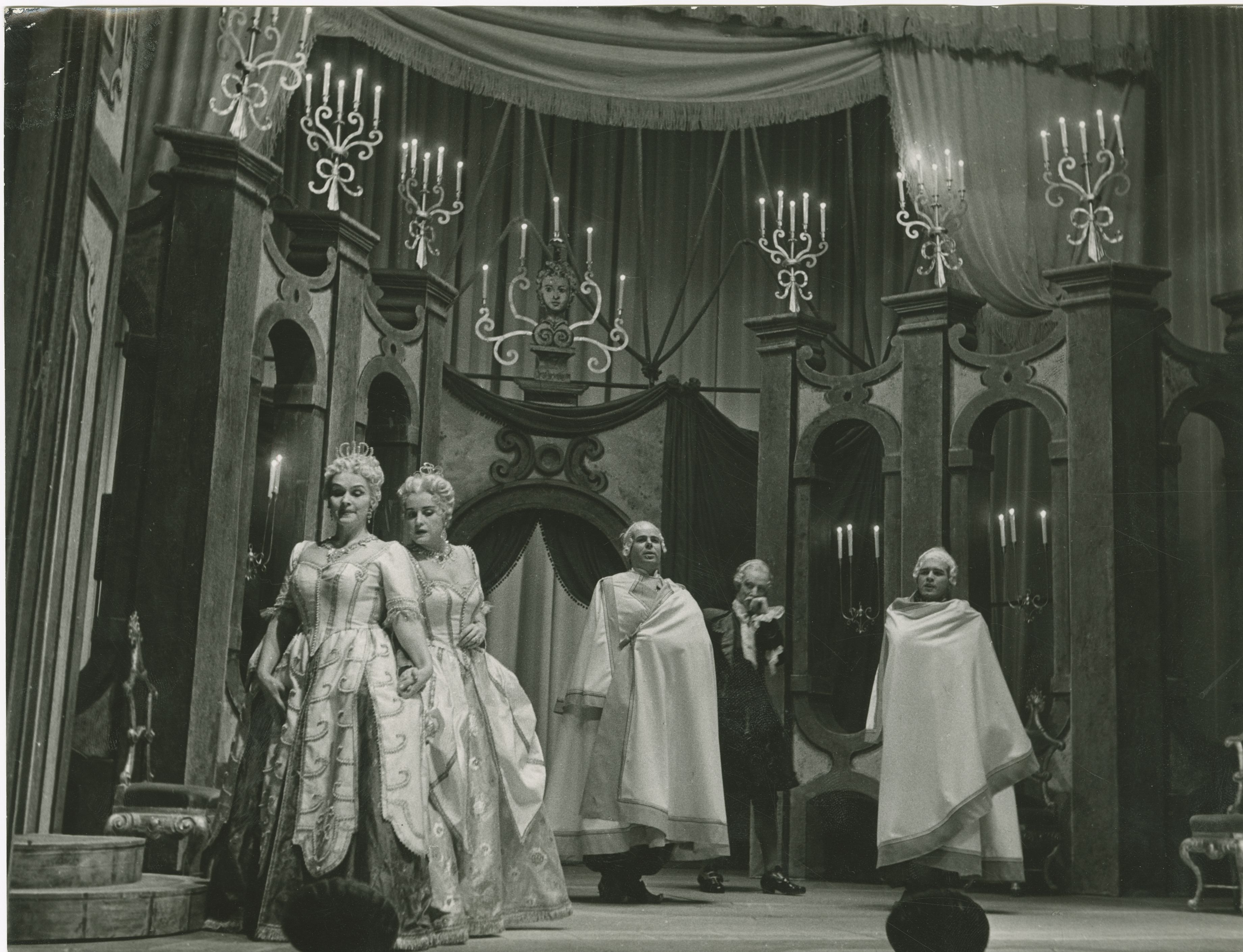
Scene of Così fan tutte. From left: Elisabeth Schwarzkopf, Nan Merriman, Rolando Panerai, Franco Calabrese and Luigi Alva. Milan, Piccola Scala, season 1955–56. Scenes and costumes by Eugene Berman.

Calabrese grew up in Lucca, graduating from the Boccherini Institute In 1947. He made his stage debut at the Teatro Comunale in Florence. In 1952, he debuted at La Scala as Angelloti in the famous de Sabata Tosca.

He was particularly renowned for his Mozart and Rossini roles, and notably those of Don Alfonso in Cosi fan tutte and the Count Almaviva in The Marriage of Figaro. Calabrese appeared in this latter role in the noted 1955 recording, with Sesto Bruscanini, Graziella Sciuti and the Glyndebourne Festival Orchestra, under the baton of Vittorio Gui.

After retiring from singing, he taught stagecraft at the same Boccherini Institute in Lucca, where his students included, among others, Graziano Polidori, Giancarlo Ceccarini, Francesco Facini and Enrico Facini.

== Discography (incomplete) ==
- Tosca, with Maria Callas and Giuseppe di Stefano. Victor de Sabata cond. at La Scala, EMI, 1952
- The Marriage of Figaro, with Sesto Bruscanini and Graziella Sciuti. Vittorio Gui cond. at Abbey Road Studios, His Master's Voice, 1955
- Il turco in Italia, with Maria Callas and Nicola Rossi-Lemeni. Gianandrea Gavazenni cond. at Teatro alla Scala, Milan, EMI, 1955
- La traviata, with Anna Moffo and Richard Tucker. Fernando Previtali cond. at The Rome Opera, RCA, 1960
- La bohème, with Mirella Freni and Luciano Pavarotti. Thomas Schippers cond. at the RAI Auditorium in Rome, 1969
