= Così fan tutte (Herbert von Karajan recording) =

Studio album
- Released: 1954
- Genre: Classical
- Label: EMI Classics
- Producer: Walter Legge

Così fan Tutte is a 1954 studio recording of Mozart's opera of the same name released by EMI Classics with the Philharmonia Orchestra and Chorus conducted by Herbert von Karajan. The cast features Elisabeth Schwarzkopf as Fiordiligi, Nan Merriman as Dorabella, Rolando Panerai as Guglielmo, Léopold Simoneau as Ferrando, and Lisa Otto as Despina.

Walter Legge was the producer and helped to procure Mozart specialists for the recording. The music was recorded at Kingsway Hall, London in July of 1954, in monophonic sound before the introduction of stereo sound recordings. The album was released in 1955 to critical acclaim and holds a high reputation in the catalogue. However, some have criticized the recording for cutting several recitatives and having a charged performance.

The recording remains a classic in the classical music repertoire, but has been overshadowed by Karl Böhm's 1962 recording with the Philharmonia Orchestra. EMI rereleased the recording several times and in 1999, under the "Great Recordings of the Century". The recording has also been released on the Naxos label. The recording was a recipient of the Diapason d'Or, a Choc du Monde de la Musique and Orphee d'Or award.

== Background ==
Così fan tutte lacked the performing tradition of Mozart's more famous operas Don Giovanni and The Marriage of Figaro. The subject matter did not offend Viennese sensibilities of the time, but in the 19th and early 20th centuries was considered risqué, vulgar, and even immoral. The opera was rarely performed, and when it did appear it was presented in one of several bowdlerised versions. The opera was not performed in the US until 1922.

The first major recording of Cosi fan tutte was released under EMI/Angel records with conductor Fritz Busch and the Glyndebourne Festival Chorus and Orchestra in 1935. Nevertheless, it was only after World War II that the opera regained a place in the standard operatic repertoire. The 1940s and 1950s saw the production of several recordings of the opera under the direction of conductors Fritz Busch with the Glyndebourne Festival and Royal Philharmonic, Karl Böhm with the Vienna Philharmonic and L'Orchestre de la Suisse Romande, and Fritz Stiedry with the Metropolitan Opera.

== Critical reception ==
In a 1960 High Fidelity review, the reviewer ranked the recording the best overall recording of the opera and noted that each singer has a "complete understanding of his role". The critic praised the balance of ensembles and volumes between the orchestra and voices. Several reviewers of the Gramophone magazine praised the recording for its ideal casting, musical enjoyment, high quality orchestra playing and the individual performances of the singers. Some later reviews of the Gramophone (1988) criticize the Karajan recording for having a "finicky effect" in a "highly charged performance". In 1993, one critic from the Metropolitan Opera Guide described the recording as unsatisfactory and "in some ways disastrous".

According to the Metropolitan Opera Guide to Recorded Opera, the recording has an "exulted reputation" among critics. In a 1989 survey, the Penguin Guide described the recording as essential supplement to the Karl Böhm recording. Some critics have named the recording one of great recordings of the 20th century.
