= Death and Transfiguration =

Tone poem by Richard Strauss

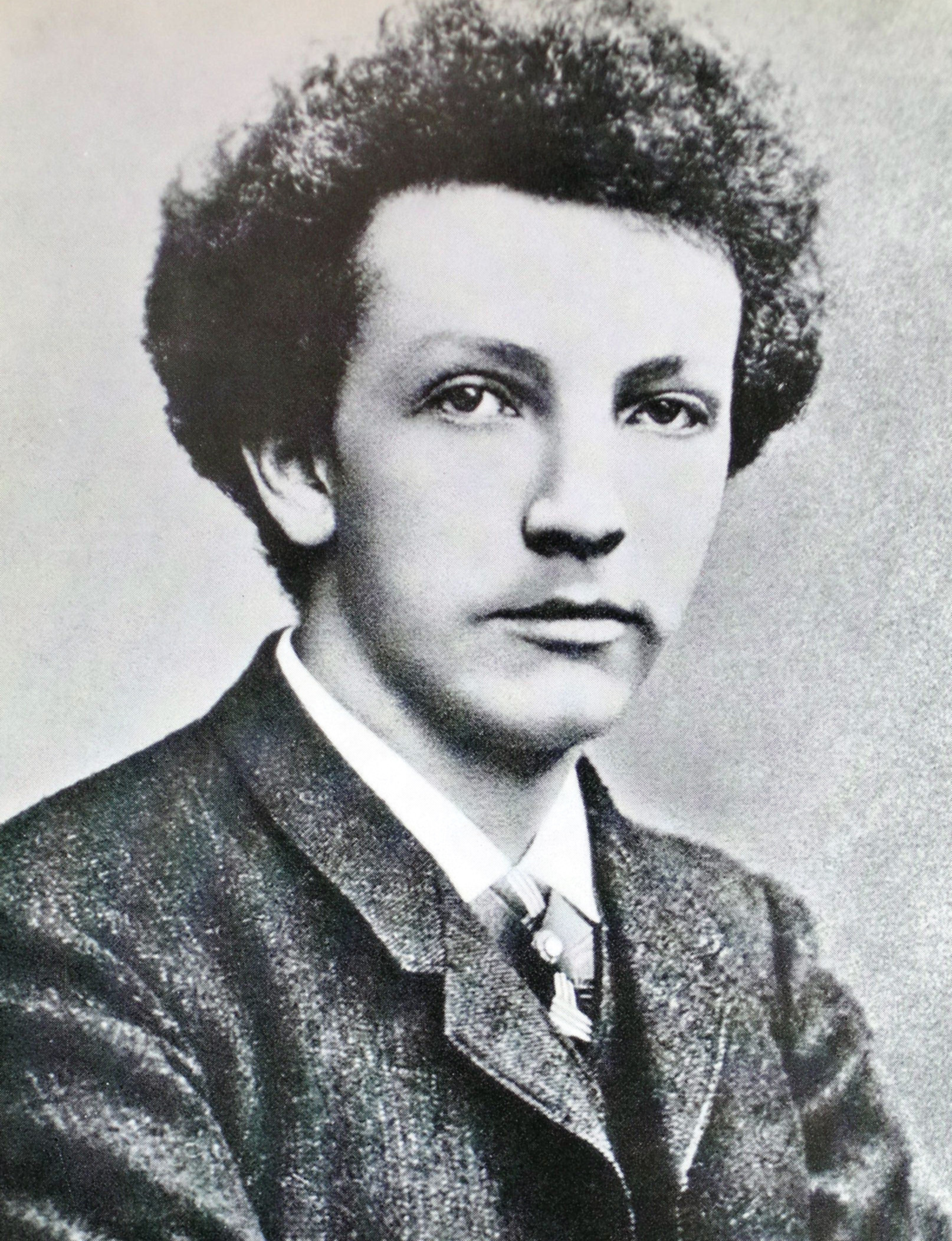
Richard Strauss in 1888

Death and Transfiguration (German: Tod und Verklärung), Op. 24, is a tone poem for orchestra by Richard Strauss. Strauss began composition in the late summer of 1888 and completed the work on 18 November 1889. The work is dedicated to the composer's friend Friedrich Rosch.

The music depicts the death of an artist. At Strauss's request, this was described in a poem by his friend Alexander Ritter as an interpretation of Death and Transfiguration, after it was composed. As the man lies dying, thoughts of his life pass through his head: his childhood innocence, the struggles of his manhood, the attainment of his worldly goals; and at the end, he receives the longed-for transfiguration "from the infinite reaches of heaven".

== Performance history ==
Strauss conducted the premiere on 21 June 1890 at the Eisenach Festival (on the same programme as the premiere of his Burleske in D minor for piano and orchestra). He also conducted this work for his first appearance in the United Kingdom, at the Wagner Concert with the Philharmonic Society on 15 June 1897 at the Queen's Hall in London.

== Critical reaction ==
English music critic Ernest Newman described this as music to which one would not want to die or awaken. "It is too spectacular, too brilliantly lit, too full of pageantry of a crowd; whereas this is a journey one must make very quietly, and alone."

French critic Romain Rolland in his Musiciens d'aujourd'hui (1908) called the piece "one of the most moving works of Strauss, and that which is constructed with the noblest utility".

== Structure ==
There are four parts (with Ritter's poetic thoughts condensed):

1. Largo (The sick man, near death)
2. Allegro molto agitato (The battle between life and death offers no respite to the man)
3. Meno mosso (The dying man's life passes before him)
4. Moderato (The sought-after transfiguration)

A typical performance lasts about 25 minutes.

== Instrumentation ==
Woodwinds
3 flutes
2 oboes
1 English horn
2 clarinets in B♭
1 bass clarinet
2 bassoons
1 contrabassoon

Brass
4 horns in F
3 trumpets in F and C
3 trombones
1 tuba

Percussion
timpani
tam-tam

Strings
violins I, II
violas
celli
double basses
2 harps

== Quoted ==
In one of his last compositions, "Im Abendrot" from the Four Last Songs, Strauss poignantly quotes the "transfiguration theme" from his tone poem of 60 years earlier, during and after the soprano's final line, "Ist dies etwa der Tod?" (Is this perhaps death?).

Just before his own death, he remarked that his music was absolutely correct, his feelings mirroring those of the artist depicted within; Strauss said to his daughter-in-law as he lay on his deathbed in 1949: "It's a funny thing, Alice, dying is just the way I composed it in Tod und Verklärung."

== Discography ==
Conductor	Orchestra	Recorded
Richard Strauss	Staatskapelle Berlin	1926
Albert Coates	London Symphony Orchestra	1928
Leopold Stokowski	Philadelphia Orchestra	1934
Richard Strauss	Munich Radio Symphony Orchestra	1937
Victor de Sabata	Berlin Philharmonic	1939
Leopold Stokowski	All-American Youth Orchestra	1941
Willem Mengelberg	Concertgebouw Orchestra	1942
Arturo Toscanini	Philadelphia Orchestra	1942
Leopold Stokowski	New York City Symphony Orchestra	1944
Richard Strauss	Vienna Philharmonic	1944
Eugene Ormandy	Philadelphia Orchestra	1945
Fritz Reiner	RCA Victor Symphony Orchestra	1950
Arturo Toscanini	NBC Symphony Orchestra	1952
Wilhelm Furtwängler	Vienna Philharmonic	1953
Victor de Sabata	Vienna Philharmonic	1953
Herbert von Karajan	Philharmonia Orchestra	2/3 June 1953
Jascha Horenstein	Bamberg Symphony	1954
William Steinberg	Pittsburgh Symphony Orchestra	1954
Karl Böhm	Concertgebouw Orchestra	1955
Hans Knappertsbusch	Orchestre de la Société des Concerts du Conservatoire	7/8 May 1956
Fritz Reiner	Vienna Philharmonic	4/6 Sep 1956
Artur Rodziński	Philharmonia Orchestra	1957
George Szell	Cleveland Orchestra	1957
Antal Doráti	Minneapolis Symphony Orchestra	1958
Eugene Ormandy	Philadelphia Orchestra	1959
Herbert von Karajan	Vienna Philharmonic	1960
Pierre Monteux	San Francisco Symphony	23 Jan 1960
Otto Klemperer	Philharmonia Orchestra	1961
Erich Leinsdorf	Los Angeles Philharmonic	1961
Zdeněk Košler	Prague Symphony Orchestra	1967
Jascha Horenstein	London Symphony Orchestra	1970
Rudolf Kempe	Staatskapelle Dresden	1970
Lorin Maazel	New Philharmonia Orchestra	1971
Herbert von Karajan	Berlin Philharmonic	1972
Eugene Ormandy	Philadelphia Orchestra	1978
Lorin Maazel	Cleveland Orchestra	1979
Antal Doráti	Detroit Symphony Orchestra	1980
Klaus Tennstedt	London Philharmonic Orchestra	1982
Claudio Abbado	London Symphony Orchestra	1981
Bernard Haitink	Royal Concertgebouw Orchestra	1981
Eduardo Mata	Dallas Symphony Orchestra	1981
Kazuyoshi Akiyama	Vancouver Symphony Orchestra	1982
Sergiu Celibidache	SWR Stuttgart Radio Symphony Orchestra	1982
Herbert von Karajan	Berlin Philharmonic	1982
Michael Gielen	Cincinnati Symphony Orchestra	1984
André Previn	Vienna Philharmonic	1987
Giuseppe Sinopoli	New York Philharmonic	1987
Christoph von Dohnányi	Vienna Philharmonic	1989
Neeme Järvi	Scottish National Orchestra	1989
Tolga Kashif	Philharmonia Orchestra	1989
Zdeněk Košler	Slovak Philharmonic	1989
Yondani Butt	London Symphony Orchestra	1990
Vladimir Ashkenazy	Cleveland Orchestra	1990
James Levine	Metropolitan Opera Orchestra	1995
Lorin Maazel	Bavarian Radio Symphony Orchestra	1995
Jesús López Cobos	Cincinnati Symphony Orchestra	1997
Herbert Blomstedt	San Francisco Symphony	1998
Kurt Masur	New York Philharmonic	1998
Vladimir Ashkenazy	Czech Philharmonic	1999
David Zinman	Tonhalle-Orchester Zürich	2001
Lorin Maazel	New York Philharmonic	2005
Donald Runnicles	Atlanta Symphony Orchestra	2006
Johannes Fritzsch	The Queensland Orchestra	2008
Manfred Honeck	Pittsburgh Symphony Orchestra	2013
Mariss Jansons	Bavarian Radio Symphony Orchestra	2014
Kent Nagano	Göteborgs Symfoniker	2016
Robin Ticciati	Deutsches Symphonie-Orchester Berlin	2020
