= Pierrette Alarie =

Canadian operatic singer

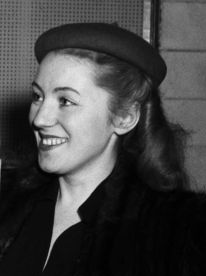
- Born: November 9, 1921; Montreal, Quebec, Canada
- Died: July 10, 2011 (aged 89); Victoria, British Columbia, Canada
- Occupation: Operatic soprano
- Years active: 1938–1970

Pierrette Alarie, CC CQ (November 9, 1921 – July 10, 2011) was a French Canadian coloratura soprano. She was married to the French-Canadian tenor Léopold Simoneau.

== Life and career ==
Born in Montreal, Quebec, Alarie was the daughter of a choirmaster, assistant conductor of the Société Canadienne d'opérettes, and of a soprano and actress. She studied voice and acting early and performed on radio from the age of 9, first as an actress and later as a singer of popular music. While studying voice with Victor Issaurel, she made her debut in 1938 at Les Variétés lyriques in the operetta The White Horse Inn. She also sang Marie in Donizetti's La fille du régiment and the lead role in Mireille. On a scholarship she went to the Curtis Institute of Music in Philadelphia to complete her studies with Elisabeth Schumann.

Alarie won the Metropolitan Opera Auditions of the Air and made her Metropolitan Opera debut on December 8, 1945, as Oscar in Un ballo in maschera under Bruno Walter. She spent three seasons at the Met singing Olympia in Offenbach's Les contes d'Hoffmann and Blonde in Mozart's Die Entführung aus dem Serail, among others.

She married French Canadian tenor Léopold Simoneau in 1946. The two had met in Montréal in the early 1940s. The couple left for France in 1949 where she made her debut at the Opéra Comique in Paris. She sang the lead role in operas such as Les pêcheurs de perles, Lakmé, Il barbiere di Siviglia, Lucia di Lammermoor, and Rigoletto. As a team Alarie and Simoneau gained celebrity in Europe and were invited to all the major festivals, Aix-en-Provence, Salzburg, Glyndebourne, Edinburgh, as well as major opera houses such as Vienna and Munich.

Alarie also had an important career in North America, appearing in opera and in recital in San Francisco, Philadelphia, New York City, New Orleans, and Montreal. Pianist Gérard Caron accompanied both Alaire and Simoneau in their recitals in the US and Canada. In Canada, Alarie performed frequently on television, Radio-Canada and CBC. She also performed regularly at the Canadian Opera Company in Toronto and the Vancouver Opera. Alarie gave her last performance in Handel's The Messiah with her husband in Montréal, on November 24, 1970.

After retiring from singing, Alarie became active as a teacher, she taught first at the Ecole Vincent d'Indy in Montréal and later at the Banff Centre. She founded with her husband the Canada Opera Piccola in Victoria, British Columbia in 1982.

== Honors ==
In 1959 she received the Calixa-Lavallée Award. In 1967 she received the Medal of Service of the Order of Canada (later exchanged to Officer of the Order of Canada) and was promoted to Companion in 1995. In 1997, she was made a Knight of the National Order of Québec. In 2003, Ms. Alarie received a Governor General's Performing Arts Award for Lifetime Artistic Achievement.

== Personal life ==
Pierrette Alarie and Léopold Simoneau had two daughters, Isabelle and Chantal. Simoneau died in 2006. Alarie died in Victoria, British Columbia on July 10, 2011, aged 89, from natural causes.
