= Rolando Panerai =

Italian baritone (1924–2019)

- Rolando Panerai in 1948
- Born: 17 October 1924
- Died: 22 October 2019 (aged 95)
- Occupations: Operatic baritone; Opera director
- Organization: La Scala

Rolando Panerai (17 October 1924 – 22 October 2019) was an Italian baritone, particularly associated with the Italian repertoire. He performed at La Scala in Milan, often alongside Maria Callas and Giuseppe Di Stefano. He was known for musical understanding, excellent diction and versatile acting in both drama and comic opera. Among his signature roles were Ford in Verdi's Falstaff and the title role of Puccini's Gianni Schicchi.

== Life and career ==
Panerai was born in Campi Bisenzio near Florence, and studied with Vito Frazzi in Florence and Giacomo Armani and Giulia Tess in Milan. Panerai appeared on stage first in 1946, as Lord Ashton in Donizettis's Lucia di Lammermoor. He appeared in 1947 in Naples at the Teatro di San Carlo as the pharaon in Rossini's Mosè in Egitto. In 1951, he performed the title role of Verdi's Simon Boccanegra in Bergamo, and the role of Sharpless in Puccini's Madama Butterfly at La Scala in Milan. He sang in many rarely performed Verdi operas on radio for RAI in 1951, (commemorating the 50th anniversary of Verdi's death), such as Giovanna d'Arco, La battaglia di Legnano, and Aroldo. He later sang most of the great Verdi baritone roles, including Rigoletto, Count De Luna in Il trovatore, Giorgio Germont in La traviata, Marquis of Posa in Don Carlos, and Amonasro in Aida.

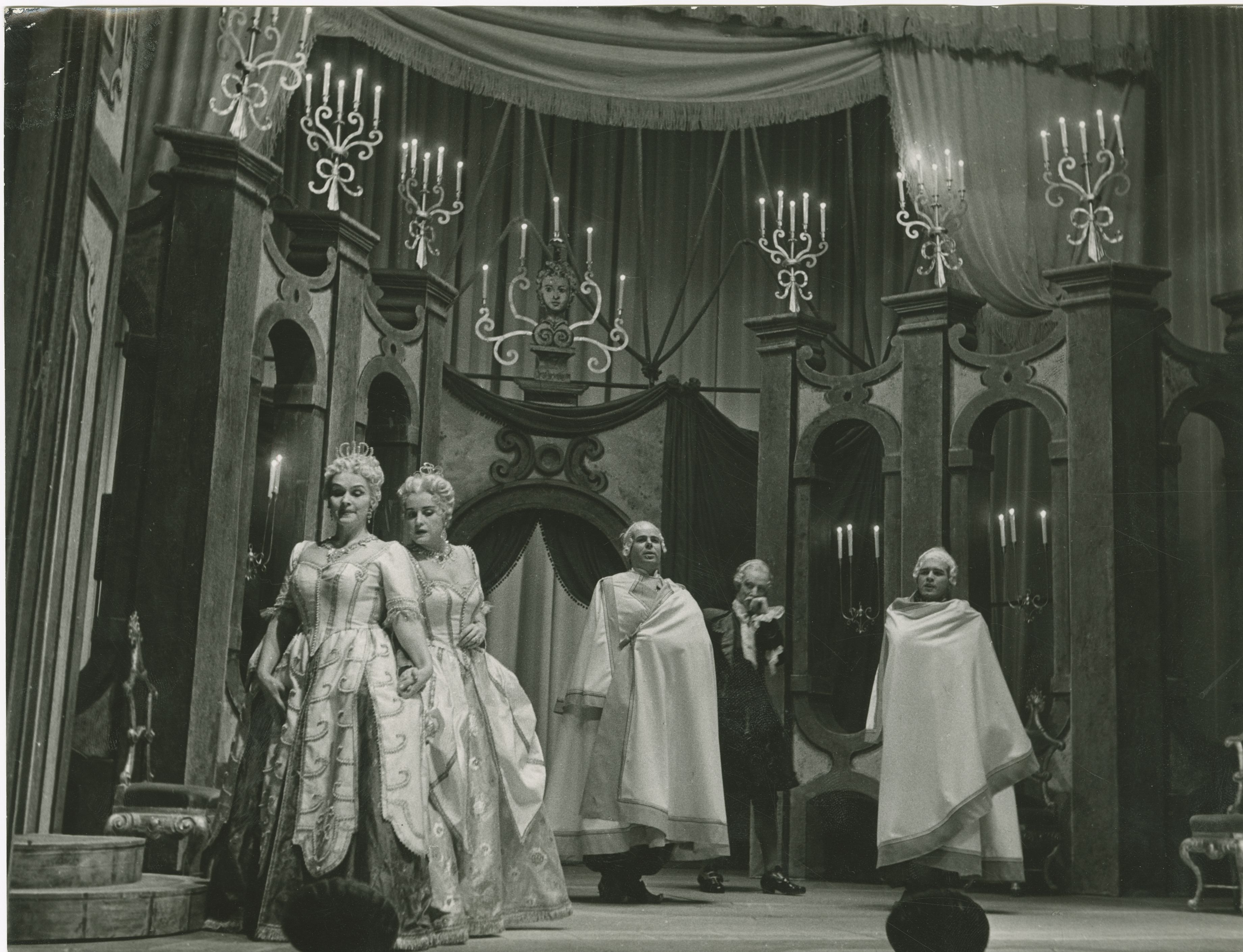
Scene of Così fan tutte. From left: Elisabeth Schwarzkopf, Nan Merriman, Rolando Panerai, Franco Calabrese and Luigi Alva. Milan, Piccola Scala, season 1955–56. Scenes and costumes by Eugene Berman.

Panerai had more than 150 operas in his repertoire, but became best-known for comic roles: Ford in Verdi's Falstaff (his signature role), Figaro in Mozart's Le nozze di Figaro, Leporello in Don Giovanni, and both Guglielmo and Alfonso in Così fan tutte, Figaro in Rossini's Il barbiere di Siviglia, both Belcore and Dulcamara in Donizetti's L'elisir d'amore, and Malatesta and the title role in Don Pasquale. He was an exponent of Puccini's Gianni Schicchi for many years, singing the role in Genoa as late as 2011, at the age of 87. He also performed more recent operas, such as the title role of Hindemith's Mathis der Maler, operas by Sergei Prokofiev and Gian Carlo Menotti, and several world premieres. He appeared internationally, including at the Paris Opera, the Royal Opera House in London, the Bolshoi Theatre in Moscow, the Oper Frankfurt, and at the Salzburg Festival and Glyndebourne Festival. Between 1955 and 1972, he regularly appeared at the Aix-en-Provence Festival. He was a regular guest at the Vienna State Opera, where he first appeared in 1956 as Enrico in Lucia di Lammermoor in a performance from La Scala with Maria Callas in the title role. His last performance there was as Dulcamara in 1998.

Panerai often partnered in recordings as on stage with Maria Callas and Giuseppe Di Stefano, as in Il trovatore, Mascagni's Cavalleria rusticana with him as Alfio, Leoncavallo's Pagliacci (singing Silvio), Bellini's I puritani and Puccini's La bohème. He also recorded a notable Sharpless alongside Renata Scotto and Carlo Bergonzi, and Germont alongside Beverly Sills and Nicolai Gedda. He played Ford in three different recordings of Falstaff, with three different singers of the title role (Tito Gobbi, Dietrich Fischer-Dieskau, and Giuseppe Taddei), the latter on video, with Herbert von Karajan conducting. He also recorded the title role. He sang Wagner in Italian translation, as Amfortas in a 1950 recorded performance of Parsifal with Callas as Kundry and Boris Christoff as Gurnemanz. He appeared on video recordings as Ford, Rossini's Figaro, Rigoletto and Silvio, and in concert in a Bolshoi Opera Night.

Even at an advanced age, Panerai was active as a teacher in masterclasses and as an opera director staging works such as Donizetti's Il campanello dello speziale, La traviata, La bohème, in 2013 Rigoletto and Il trovatore, and in 2018 Gianni Schicchi.

Panerai died on 22 October 2019, five days after his 95th birthday.

== See also ==
- Così fan tutte (Herbert von Karajan recording)

== Sources ==
- Alain Pâris, Dictionnaire des interprètes et de l’interprétation musicale au XX siècle (2 vols), Éditions Robert Laffont (Bouquins, Paris 1982, 4th Edn. 1995, 5th Edn 2004). ISBN 2-221-06660-X
- D. Hamilton (ed.),The Metropolitan Opera Encyclopedia: A Complete Guide to the World of Opera (Simon and Schuster, New York 1987). ISBN 0-671-61732-X
- Roland Mancini and Jean-Jacques Rouveroux, (orig. H. Rosenthal and J. Warrack, French edition), Guide de l’opéra, Les indispensables de la musique (Fayard, 1995). ISBN 2-213-59567-4
- Rolando Panerai, simpatia e comunicativo, Elio Trovato, Ed. Azzali, 2009
