= Don Giovanni (Giulini recording) =

1959 studio album by Carlo Maria Giulini

Studio album by Carlo Maria Giulini
- Released: 1959
- Studio: Abbey Road Studios
- Genre: Opera
- Length: 172:28
- Language: Italian
- Label: EMI Records
- Producer: Walter Legge

Don Giovanni is a 1959 studio recording of Wolfgang Amadeus Mozart's opera of the same name, released by the EMI label with the Philharmonia Orchestra and Philharmonia Choir conducted by Carlo Maria Giulini. The recording features Eberhard Wächter as Don Giovanni, Joan Sutherland as Donna Anna, Luigi Alva as Don Ottavio, Elisabeth Schwarzkopf as Donna Elvira, Gottlob Frick as the Commendatore, and Giuseppe Taddei as Leporello.

Upon release, the recording received mostly positive reviews, with reviews praising the drama's excitement throughout the recording. Since its initial release, the recording has gained recognition as one of the greatest classical recordings of all time, is considered a benchmark recording for the opera and a popular favorite among critics. EMI rereleased the recording under the Great Recordings of the Century series in 2002. The recording received a Diapason d'Or, Choc du Monde de la Musique, and Orphée d'Or Award.

== Track listing ==
=== CD 1 ===
- 1-1 Overture 6:18
- 1-2 Act 1, Scene 1: Introduction: Notte e giorno faticar 1:40
- 1-3 Act 1, Scene 1: Non sperar, se non m'uccidi 1:17
- 1-4 Act 1, Scene 1: Lasciala, indegno! 2:07
- 1-5 Act 1, Scene 1: Recitative: Leporello, ove sei? 0:28
- 1-6 Act 1, Scene 1: Recitative: Ah del padre in periglio 2:36
- 1-7 Act 1, Scene 1: Duet: Fuggi, crudele, fuggi! 4:02
- 1-8 Act 1, Scene 2: Recitative: Orsù, spicciati presto 1:15
- 1-9 Act 1, Scene 2: Aria: Ah, chi mi dice mai 3:26
- 1-10 Act 1, Scene 2: Recitative: Chi è là? 2:27
- 1-11 Act 1, Scene 2: Aria: Madamina, il catalogo è questo 5:28
- 1-12 Act 1, Scene 2: Recitativo: In questa forma 0:28
- 1-13 Act 1, Scene 3: Coro: Giovinette che fate all'amore 1:30
- 1-14 Act 1, Scene 3: Recitative: Manco male è partita 2:01
- 1-15 Act 1, Scene 3: Aria: Ho capito, signor, sì! 1:38
- 1-16 Act 1, Scene 3: Recitative: Alfin siam liberati 1:34
- 1-17 Act 1, Scene 3: Duet: Là ci darem la mano 3:14
- 1-18 Act 1, Scene 3: Recitativo: Fermati, scellerato! 0:37
- 1-19 Act 1, Scene 3: Aria: Ah! Fuggi il traditor! 1:18
- 1-20 Act 1, Scene 3: Recitative: Mi par ch'oggi il demonio si diverta 0:53
- 1-21 Act 1, Scene 3: Quartet: Non ti fidar, o misera 3:57
- 1-22 Act 1, Scene 3: Recitative: Povera sventura! 0:18
- 1-23 Act 1, Scene 3: Recitative: Don Ottavio, son morta! 2:49
- 1-24 Act 1, Scene 3: Aria: Or sai chi l'onore 2:50
- 1-25 Act 1, Scene 3: Recitative: Come mai creder deggio 0:23
- 1-26 Act 1, Scene 3: Aria: Dalla sua pace 4:21
- 1-27 Act 1, Scene 3: Recitative: Io deggio ad ogni patto 1:21
- 1-28 Act 1, Scene 3: Aria: Finch'han dal vino

=== CD 2 ===
- 2-1 Act 1, Scene 4: Recitative: Masetto, senti un po' 1:01
- 2-2 Act 1, Scene 4: Aria: Batti, batti, o bel Masetto 3:47
- 2-3 Act 1, Scene 4: Recitative: Guarda un po' 0:34
- 2-4 Act 1, Scene 4: Presto, presto, pria ch'ei venga 1:49
- 2-5 Act 1, Scene 4: Tra quest'arbori celata 2:30
- 2-6 Act 1, Scene 4: Bisogna aver coraggio 2:08
- 2-7 Act 1, Scene 4: Protegga il giusto cielo/Vendichi il giusto cielo 2:19
- 2-8 Act 1, Scene 5: Riposate, vezzose ragazze 1:20
- 2-9 Act 1, Scene 5: Venite pur avanti 1:24
- 2-10 Act 1, Scene 5: ricominciate il suono! 2:49
- 2-11 Act 1, Scene 5: Ecco il birbo, che t'ha offesa! 1:33
- 2-12 Act 1, Scene 5: Trema, trema, o scellerato! 2:12
- 2-13 Act 2, Scene 1: Duet: Eh via, buffone, non mi seccar! 1:08
- 2-14 Act 2, Scene 1: Recitative: Leporello!....Signore? 1:35
- 2-15 Act 2, Scene 1: Terzetto: Ah taci, inguisto coro! 4:50
- 2-16 Act 2, Scene 1: Recitative: Amico, che ti par? 0:25
- 2-17 Act 2, Scene 1: Recitative: Eccomi a voi 1:22
- 2-18 Act 2, Scene 1: Canzonetta: Deh vieni all finestra 1:51
- 2-19 Act 2, Scene 1: Recitative: V'è gente alla finestra 1:06
- 2-20 Act 2, Scene 1: Aria: Metà di voi qua vadano 3:12
- 2-21 Act 2, Scene 1: Recitative: Zitto, lascia ch'io senta 1:39
- 2-22 Act 2, Scene 1: Aria: Vedrai, carino, se sei buonino 3:14
- 2-23 Act 2, Scene 2: Recitative: Di molte faci il lume 0:21
- 2-24 Act 2, Scene 2: Sola, sola in buio loco 3:02
- 2-25 Act 2, Scene 2: Ferma, briccone, dove ten vai? 2:22
- 2-26 Act 2, Scene 2: Mille torbidi pensieri 2:23
- 2-27 Act 2, Scene 2: Recitative: Dunque quello sei tu 0:19
- 2-28 Act 2, Scene 2: Aria: Ah, pietà, signori miei! 1:52
- 2-29 Act 2, Scene 2: Recitative: Ferma, perfido, ferma! 0:30
- 2-30 Act 2, Scene 2: Aria: Il mio tesoro 4:38
- 2-31 Act 2, Scene 2: Recitative: In quali eccessi, o numi 1:48
- 2-32 Act 2, Scene 2: Aria: Mi tradì, quell'alma ingrata

=== CD 3 ===
- 3-1 Act 2, Scene 3: Recitative: Ah, ah, ah, ah, questa è buona 3:40
- 3-2 Act 2, Scene 3: Duet: O statua gentilissima 3:37
- 3-3 Act 2, Scene 4: Recitative: Calmatevi, idol mio! 0:37
- 3-4 Act 2, Scene 4: Recitative: Crudele? Ah no, mio bene! 1:51
- 3-5 Act 2, Scene 4: Aria: Non mi dir, bell'idol mio 5:01
- 3-6 Act 2, Scene 4: Recitative: Ah, si segua il suo passo 0:13
- 3-7 Act 2, Scene 5: Già la mensa è perparata 4:36
- 3-8 Act 2, Scene 5: L'ultima prova dell'amor mio 2:15
- 3-9 Act 2, Scene 5: Che grido è questo mai? 1:15
- 3-10 Act 2, Scene 5: Don Giovanni, a cenar teco 5:20
- 3-11 Act 2, Scene 5: Da qual tremore insolito 1:06
- 3-12 Act 2, Scene 5: Ah, dov'è il perfido? 1:40
- 3-13 Act 2, Scene 5: Or che tutti, o mio tesoro 2:58
- 3-14 Act 2, Scene 5: Questo è il fin

== Personnel ==
=== Musical ===
- Soprano vocals [Donna Elvira] – Elisabeth Schwarzkopf
- Soprano Vocals [Donna Anna] – Joan Sutherland
- Soprano vocals [Zerlina] – Graziella Sciutti
- Tenor vocals [Don Ottavio] – Luigi Alva
- Baritone vocals [Leporello] – Giuseppe Taddei
- Bass vocals [Don Giovanni] – Eberhard Wächter
- Bass vocals [Le Commandeur] – Gottlob Frick
- Bass vocals [Masetto] – Piero Cappuccilli
- Chorus – Philharmonia Chorus
- Chorus master – Roberto Benaglio
- Conductor – Carlo Maria Giulini
- Harpsichord – Professor Heinrich Schmidt

=== Other ===
- Producer – Walter Legge
- Engineer [balance engineer] – Harold Davidson

== See also ==
- Le nozze di Figaro (Giulini 1959 recording)
