= Nan Merriman =

American opera singer

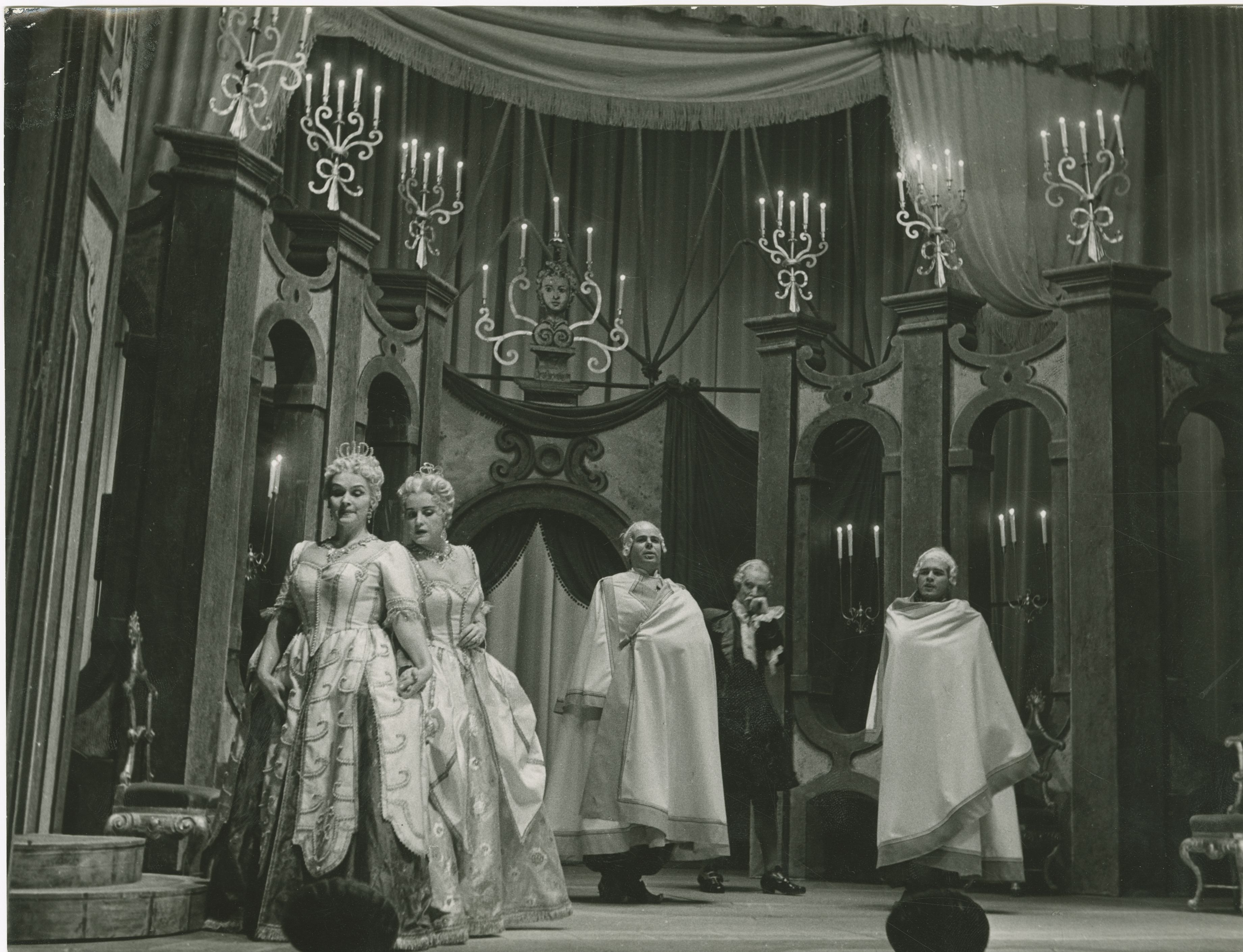
Scene of Così fan tutte. From left: Elisabeth Schwarzkopf, Nan Merriman, Rolando Panerai, Franco Calabrese and Luigi Alva. Milan, Piccola Scala, season 1955–56. Scenes and costumes by Eugene Berman.

Katherine Ann Merriman (April 28, 1920 – July 22, 2012) was an American operatic mezzo-soprano.

== Biography ==
A native of Pittsburgh, Pennsylvania, she performed with her pianist brother, J. Vick O'Brien (later president of the Pittsburgh National Bank, and father of Thomas H. O’Brien, retired president of PNC), in cafes and supper clubs in the Pittsburgh area. She studied singing with retired lyric soprano Alexis Bassian in San Francisco and with Lotte Lehmann in Los Angeles. By the age of twenty she was singing on Hollywood film soundtracks and it was there that she was spotted by Laurence Olivier. He picked Merriman to accompany him and his wife, actress Vivien Leigh, on a tour of Romeo and Juliet, where she performed songs during the set changes.

Her voice was used in two Jeanette MacDonald movies, first in a chorus in Maytime (1937), then in a brief solo early in Smilin' Through (1941).

Merriman sang many roles both live and on radio under the baton of Arturo Toscanini between 1944 and 1953, while he was conductor of the NBC Symphony Orchestra. Among the roles she sang with him, were Maddalena in Act IV of Verdi's Rigoletto, Emilia in Verdi's Otello, Mistress Page in Verdi's Falstaff, and the trousers role of Orfeo in Act II of Gluck's Orfeo ed Euridice and also sang in his first and only studio recording of Beethoven's Ninth Symphony, with the NBC Symphony Orchestra, in 1952. She was also featured as Dorabella in a 1956 La Scala performance of Mozart's Così fan tutte, which was conducted by Toscanini's short-lived protégé, Guido Cantelli. She sang Mozart's Dorabella at San Francisco Opera in 1957.

Merriman recorded Mahler's Das Lied von der Erde three times, twice with the tenor Ernst Haefliger and the Concertgebouw Orchestra. The 1957 recording was conducted by Eduard van Beinum for the Philips label, while the 1963 recording was conducted by Eugen Jochum for Deutsche Grammophon (see discography in the external links). The latter recording was awarded the Grand Prix du Disque of the Académie Charles Cros. A third recording, with tenor Fritz Wunderlich and the NDR Symphony Orchestra under conductor Hans Schmidt-Isserstedt, was recorded live in Hamburg in April 1965, and released under different labels.

Merriman was particularly well received in the Netherlands, where she met and married Dutch tenor Tom Brand, a widower with several children. She retired from performing to care for the family in 1965. Brand died in 1970. After the children were grown, she maintained residences in Hawaii and California. She died at her home in Los Angeles on July 22, 2012 from natural causes, aged 92.

== Sources ==
- Rosenthal, Harold. "Merriman, Nan". Grove Music Online. Fitzroy Dearborn.
