= Victor de Sabata =

Italian conductor and composer

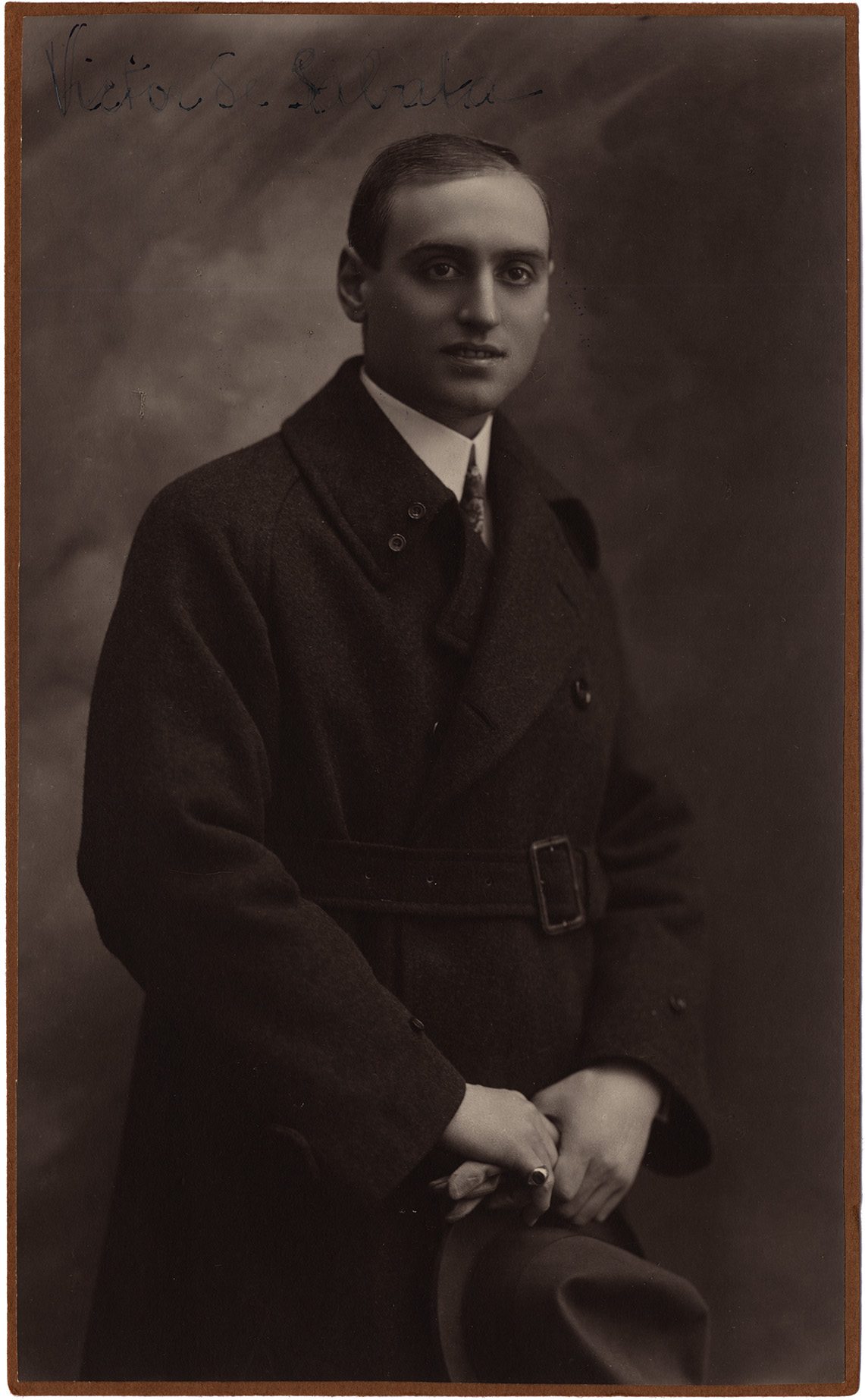
Victor de Sabata

Victor de Sabata (10 April 1892 – 11 December 1967) was an Italian conductor and composer. He is widely recognized as one of the most distinguished operatic conductors of the twentieth century, especially for his Verdi, Puccini and Wagner.

De Sabata was acclaimed for his interpretations of orchestral music. Like his near contemporary Wilhelm Furtwängler, de Sabata regarded composition as more important than conducting but achieved more lasting recognition for his conducting than his compositions. De Sabata has been praised by various authors and critics as a rival to Toscanini for the title of greatest Italian conductor of the twentieth century, and even as "perhaps the greatest conductor in the world".

In 1918, aged 26, de Sabata was appointed conductor of the Monte Carlo Opera, performing a wide variety of late-19th century and contemporary works, and earning acclaim from Maurice Ravel. De Sabata became the music director at La Scala in Milan, a post he would hold for over 20 years. His animated conducting style led one observer to describe his appearance in performance as "a cross between Julius Caesar and Satan."

Following World War II, his career expanded internationally. He was a frequent guest conductor in London, New York and other American cities. His post-war operatic work included celebrated collaborations with Maria Callas and Renata Tebaldi, most notably his famous recording of Tosca with Callas in 1953. His career was cut short by a heart attack that same year.

== Early life ==
Victor de Sabata was born in Trieste, at the time part of Austria-Hungary, but now part of Italy. His Roman Catholic father, Amedeo de Sabata, was a professional singing teacher and chorus master, and his mother, Rosita Tedeschi, a talented amateur musician, was Jewish.

De Sabata began playing the piano at the age of four, and composed a gavotte for that instrument at the age of six. He composed his first work for orchestra at the age of twelve.

His formal musical studies began after his family moved to Milan around 1900. In Milan, de Sabata studied at the Giuseppe Verdi Conservatory, excelling at piano, violin, theory, composition and conducting, and graduating cum laude in composition, piano and violin. He would remain a virtuoso pianist and violinist up until the end of his life.

In 1911 he performed in an orchestra under the baton of Arturo Toscanini who influenced him to become a conductor. De Sabata's first opera, Il macigno, was produced at the opera house of La Scala on 31 March 1917 to a mixed reception. It was frequently performed during the next few years.

== Conducting career ==
=== 1918–1929 ===
In 1918 de Sabata was appointed conductor of the Monte Carlo Opera, performing a wide variety of late-19th-century and contemporary works. In 1925, he conducted the world premiere of L'enfant et les sortilèges by Ravel. Ravel said that de Sabata was a conductor "the like of which I have never before encountered" and wrote him a note the next day saying that "You have given me one of the most complete joys of my career". Ravel also claimed that, within twelve hours of receiving the score to L'enfant, the conductor had memorized it.

In 1921, while still conducting opera at Monte Carlo, de Sabata began his career as a symphonic conductor with the Orchestra of the Accademia di Santa Cecilia in Rome. In 1927 he made his U.S. debut with the Cincinnati Symphony Orchestra, substituting for Fritz Reiner in the first eight concerts of the year. He did the same in 1928.

=== 1929–1945 ===
De Sabata conducted the orchestra of La Scala in concert starting in the 1921–22 season, and conducted opera there from 1929. He became the principal conductor in 1930 in succession to Toscanini. Soon after taking up the post, he resigned because of a disagreement with the orchestra over the poor reception of his composition A Thousand and One Nights. Toscanini wrote him a letter in order to persuade him to return, saying that his absence was "damaging to you and the theater".

De Sabata did return to La Scala, and continued in the post for over 20 years. However, he did not reply to Toscanini, and the two conductors remained estranged until the 1950s.

During the 1930s, de Sabata conducted widely in Italy and Central Europe. In 1933 he made his first commercial recordings with the Orchestra of the Italian Broadcasting Authority in Turin, including his own composition Juventus. According to Benito Mussolini's son Romano, de Sabata was "a personal friend" of the Italian dictator, and gave "several concerts" at the leader's Villa Torlonia home.

According to George Richard Marek's biography of Toscanini, de Sabata's friendship with Mussolini became another factor distancing him from his former mentor Toscanini.

In 1936, he appeared with the Vienna State Opera. In 1939, he became only the second conductor from outside the German-speaking world to conduct at the Bayreuth Festspielhaus when he led Wagner's opera Tristan und Isolde (Toscanini had been the first, in 1930 and 1931). Among the audience at Bayreuth was the young Sergiu Celibidache, who hid in the lavatory overnight in order to surreptitiously attend rehearsals. That same year he made celebrated recordings of Brahms, Wagner and Richard Strauss with the Berlin Philharmonic. He developed a friendship with the young Herbert von Karajan. In the closing stages of the war, de Sabata helped Karajan relocate his family to Italy.

In 1940 he met the seventeen-year old Valentina Cortese in Stresa, with whom he began a romantic relationship; They separated in 1948.

=== 1945–1953 ===
After World War II, de Sabata's career expanded internationally. He was a frequent guest conductor in London, New York and other American cities. In 1946 he recorded with the London Philharmonic Orchestra for the Decca recording company. In 1947 he switched labels to His Master's Voice, recording with the Santa Cecilia Orchestra in Rome. These sessions included the premiere recording of Debussy's Jeux. He would go on to make more recordings with the same orchestra in 1948. In 1950 he was temporarily detained at Ellis Island along with several other Europeans under the newly passed McCarran Act (the reason was his work in Italy during Benito Mussolini's Fascist regime). In March 1950 and March 1951 de Sabata conducted the New York Philharmonic in a series of concerts in Carnegie Hall, many of which were preserved from radio transcriptions to form some of the most valuable items in his recorded legacy.

De Sabata's base remained La Scala, Milan, and he had the opportunity to work with two upwardly-mobile sopranos: Renata Tebaldi and Maria Callas. In August 1953 he collaborated with Callas in his only commercial opera recording: Puccini's Tosca for His Master's Voice (also featuring Giuseppe Di Stefano and Tito Gobbi along with the La Scala orchestra and chorus). This production is widely regarded as one of the greatest opera recordings of all time. One critic has written that de Sabata's success in this Tosca "remains so decisive that had he never recorded another note, his fame would still be assured".

=== Heart attack and retirement ===
The Tosca recording was planned to be only the first of a series of recordings in which His Master's Voice would set down much of de Sabata's operatic repertoire. However, soon after the sessions, he suffered a heart attack so severe that it prompted him to stop performing regularly in public. His decision to stop conducting has also been attributed to "disillusionment".

His scheduled December 1953 La Scala performance of Alessandro Scarlatti's Mitridate Eupatore with Callas was replaced at short notice by an acclaimed Cherubini Medea with Leonard Bernstein. He resigned his conducting post at La Scala and was succeeded by his assistant Carlo Maria Giulini.

Between 1953 and 1957 he held the administrative position of "Artistic Director" at La Scala. This period was notable for a reconciliation with Toscanini (with whom he had had a cool relationship for twenty years) during a La Scala production of Spontini's La vestale in 1954.

De Sabata conducted only twice more, once in a studio recording of Verdi's Requiem from June 1954 for His Master's Voice, and for the last time at Arturo Toscanini's memorial service (conducting the funeral march from Beethoven's Eroica Symphony at La Scala opera house followed by Verdi's Requiem in Milan Cathedral) in 1957. The last decade of his life was devoted to composition but with few results. Although Walter Legge (husband of Dame Elisabeth Schwarzkopf) offered de Sabata an opportunity to conduct the Philharmonia Orchestra in 1964 and later suggested de Sabata write a completion to Puccini's opera Turandot, neither opportunity was realised. He enjoyed solving mathematical problems in his retirement.

== Death ==
Victor de Sabata died of heart disease in Santa Margherita Ligure, Liguria, Italy in 1967, aged 75. At his memorial service, the Orchestra of La Scala performed without a conductor as a mark of respect. De Sabata is buried in the cemetery of Gavarno Vescovado near Bergamo.

The "Award Victor de Sabata" is named after de Sabata. A prize for young musicians sponsored by the province of Genoa and the region of Liguria, the competition takes place in Santa Margherita.

== Conducting style ==
De Sabata's conducting style combined the fiery temperament, iron control and technical precision of Toscanini with greater spontaneity and attention to orchestral color. He was exceptionally demanding of his players: according to one musician: "Those eyes and ears missed nothing ... the players had been made to work harder than ever before and they knew that, without having been asked to play alone, they had been individually assessed". On the podium he "seemed to be dancing everything from a tarantella to a sabre dance". He suffered from a limp as a result of a childhood polio infection.

Norman Lebrecht describes him as "a musician whose mild manners turned to raging fury whenever he took stick in hand". One critic used the phrase "lull and stun" to summarize his technique.

A violinist in the London Philharmonic Orchestra compared de Sabata with Sir Thomas Beecham, saying that while Beecham made the orchestra "red hot", de Sabata made it white hot. Another player described de Sabata's appearance when conducting as "a cross between Julius Caesar and Satan".

Double-bass player Robert Meyer, who has played under many leading conductors including Furtwängler, Karajan, Klemperer, Giulini, Walter, Koussevitzky and Stokowski, describes de Sabata as "undoubtedly the finest conductor I have ever encountered". He conducted rehearsals, as well as concerts, from memory.

A musician who played under both Toscanini and de Sabata at La Scala compared them, saying:

[Toscanini] wasn't like "Dede" – De Sabata: he, too, was a great conductor, but he was changeable. One day he would be fine and would conduct a certain way; the next day he would be full of aches and pains and would conduct a different way. He was always somewhat ill. He, too, would be transformed, once he picked up the baton... and I must admit that Tristan und Isolde made an even bigger impression when De Sabata conducted it than with Toscanini. Toscanini was perfection: upright, even. De Sabata, on the other hand, pushed and pulled the music. Afterwards, when Toscanini had left, De Sabata was the only one who could take his place. Despite his faults, he, too, was a great conductor and a musician of the highest order. Once, in Turandot, he heard a mistake made by the third trombone, and it was discovered to be a printer's error that not even Toscanini had caught.

Conductor Riccardo Chailly reports that de Sabata would have the strings sing along with the trombone glissandi at the climax of Ravel's Boléro, and that Chailly himself asks orchestras to do the same thing.

=== Criticism ===
Toscanini did not approve of de Sabata's conducting style or of many of his interpretations: he considered the younger man's gestures to be too flamboyant.

Puccini wrote in a letter dating from 1920 that "although [De Sabata] is an excellent musician of the other school – that is, the modern school – he can't, and does not know how to, conduct my music."

== Anecdotes of musical abilities ==
After de Sabata was shown the score for the first time of Elgar's Enigma Variations, the next day he conducted a rehearsal of the work from memory and pointed out several errors in the orchestral parts which no-one, including Elgar himself, had noticed previously.

During a rehearsal of Respighi's Pines of Rome in London, de Sabata "demonstrated the bowing and fingering of the high cello part in the first movement by playing it—without even a glance at the part. The pianist asked for advice about the solo cadenza, which de Sabata also played by heart. In the rehearsal interval, he asked the flicorni for the final movement to play their brass fanfares. They did. 'What are you playing?' he asked. 'It is an octave higher.' 'Can't be done, Maestro.' ... The Maestro borrowed one of their instruments and blew the correct notes in the right octave."

"A visitor [to La Scala] rehearsing Tristan asked Victor de Sabata to take the baton while he tested the sound from the centre of the auditorium. Needless to say, the sound he heard was totally different from the one he produced. De Sabata, without uttering a word, asserted his dominance of the orchestra just by standing there". When Herbert von Karajan was making his own recording of Tosca in 1962, he would often ask his producer John Culshaw to play selections from the de Sabata/Callas recording to him. Culshaw reports that "One exceptionally tricky passage for the conductor is the entry of Tosca in act 3, where Puccini's tempo directions can best be described as elastic. Karajan listened to de Sabata several times over during that passage and then said, 'No, he's right but I can't do that. That's his secret.'"

== Selected discography ==
The recordings that de Sabata made in the studio are, with some exceptions, considered less gripping than the best of his work in the concert hall and opera house. (This may be related to the fact that he is said to have hated making recordings). Fortunately there are now several unauthorized "live" recordings that demonstrate how exciting de Sabata could be on the podium (although the sound quality can be problematic). This contrast comes through in the two different versions of Richard Strauss's Death and Transfiguration and Verdi's Requiem listed below.

- Beethoven, Fifth Symphony, live performance with the New York Philharmonic, New York, 1950 (currently available on Urania and Tahra: Urania is superior)
- Beethoven, Eighth Symphony, live performance with the New York Philharmonic, New York, 1951 (currently available on Istituto Discografico Italiano)
- Brahms, Fourth Symphony, studio recording with the Berlin Philharmonic, Deutsche Grammophon 1939 (currently available on Pearl)
- Debussy, Jeux, studio recording with the Orchestra of the Accademia di Santa Cecilia, Rome, His Master's Voice, 1947. The premiere recording of this work. (currently available on Pristine Audio and Testament)
- Debussy, La mer, studio recording with the Orchestra of the Accademia di Santa Cecilia, Rome, His Master's Voice 1948 (currently available on Testament)
- Puccini, Tosca, studio recording with Callas, His Master's Voice 1953. De Sabata's and Callas's most famous recording. (currently available on EMI and Naxos Records)
- Respighi, Feste Romane, studio recording with the Berlin Philharmonic, Deutsche Grammophon, 1939 (currently available on Pearl)

This recording was described as "quite simply, sensational, definitive...The piece blazes with colour" in Gramophone magazine.

- Respighi, Fontane di Roma, studio recording with the Orchestra of the Accademia di Santa Cecilia, Rome, His Master's Voice, 1947 (currently available on Testament)
- Respighi, Pines of Rome, live performance with the New York Philharmonic, New York, 1950 (currently available on Urania)
- Schumann, Piano Concerto, live performance with Claudio Arrau and the New York Philharmonic, Carnegie Hall, New York, 1951
- Sibelius, First Symphony, live performance with the New York Philharmonic, New York, 1950 (currently available on Urania and Nuova Era)
- Richard Strauss, Death and Transfiguration, studio recording with the Berlin Philharmonic, Deutsche Grammophon 1939 (currently available on Pearl)
- Richard Strauss, Death and Transfiguration, live performance with the Vienna Philharmonic, Salzburg, 1953 (currently available on IDI and Nuova Era)
- Verdi, Falstaff, live performance with Tebaldi and Stabile, La Scala, Milan, 1951 (currently available on Music and Arts, and Urania)
  - "[o]ne of the most remarkable performances of anything by Verdi ever captured on a disc." De Sabata "creates a performance of electric immediacy with an extraordinary attention to the score's detail and architecture."
- Verdi, Macbeth, live performance with Callas, La Scala, Milan, 1952 (currently available on EMI)
  - Callas and de Sabata "bring an almost supernatural tension to Lady Macbeth's disintegration." "Despite the poor recorded sound, this comes close to dramatic perfection."
  - "Victor de Sabata's inspired baton makes this performance a gem. Unfortunately, while de Sabata and most of the principals are perfectly fine, there is a severe stature gap in the title role. Mascherini is simply not adequate either to his colleagues or to Verdi's demands. Consequently, for much of the performance, Callas interprets alone. But her brilliant collaboration with de Sabata pays rich dividends."
- Verdi, Requiem, live performance with Tebaldi, La Scala, Milan, 1951 (currently available on Urania)
  - "A total view of the work can be felt, also a keen ear for relevant detail... Here is the only representation of Renata Tebaldi's fervent, soaring soprano in music that ideally suited her, a poised 'huic ergo', finely floated 'sed signifer', electrifying, as is de Sabata, in the Libera me... All in all, this version takes a very high place in the discography of this work."
- Verdi, Requiem, studio recording with Schwarzkopf, His Master's Voice 1954 (currently available on EMI)
  - Speeds are "positively grotesque... All are far below Verdi's metronome marks with disastrous results on the work's structure."
- Wagner, Tristan und Isolde, live performance with Gertrude Grob-Prandl and Max Lorenz, La Scala, Milan, 1951 (currently available on Archipel)

"[a] staggering performance in spite of its cuts, and the primitiveness of the recording". The Prelude to Act Three "is one of the most powerful interpretations of this heart-breaking music on record".

- Wagner, miscellaneous operatic excerpts, live performance with Eileen Farrell and the New York Philharmonic, New York, 1951 (currently available on Urania).

== Compositions ==
De Sabata's compositions are written in a late-romantic style with similarities to Respighi and, especially, Richard Strauss (one early commentator went so far as to call de Sabata the older composer's "adoptive son").

It was as a composer that de Sabata first came to widespread attention, with the production of his opera Il Macigno in La Scala's 1917 season followed by performances of his orchestral Symphonic Suite (1912) and symphonic poem Juventus (1919) by conductors such as Walter Damrosch, Pierre Monteux, and Arturo Toscanini during the early 1920s. His compositions are little-known today, although Lorin Maazel had them in his repertoire.

One reason may be that de Sabata did relatively little to perform and publicize his own works, preferring that his music should succeed or fail on its own merits. Critical opinion on the merits of his compositions has long been divided. For example, a 1926 Time Magazine review described his Gethsemani as "shallow, unoriginal music for which even the philanthropic genius of a Toscanini could not achieve distinction", while a critic for International Record Review, writing in the early 2000s, said that the same work "contains some of the loveliest orchestral sounds I have heard in years".

=== Published compositions ===
- Suite per grande orchestra in quattro tempi, Op. 2 ("Suite for large orchestra in four movements", 1909)
- Il macigno; 3 atti di Alberto Colantuoni ("The Rock", opera in 3 acts, 1917). Revised as Driada in 1935.
- Melodia per Violino (1918)
- Juventus: poema sinfonico ("Juventus: symphonic poem", 1919).
- Lisistrata (opera, after Aristophanes, 1920).
- La notte di Plàton: quadro sinfonico per orchestra ("The night of Plato: symphonic sketch for orchestra", 1923).
- Gethsemani, poema contemplativo per orchestra ("Gethsemane, contemplative poem for orchestra", 1925).
- Mille e una notte: fiaba coreografica in 7 quadri ("1001 nights: choreographic fairy tale in 7 scenes", ballet, 1931).
- Incidental music for Shakespeare's The Merchant of Venice, 1934.

=== Recordings of de Sabata's compositions ===
- Juventus, studio recording with the Turin Orchestra of the Italian Broadcasting Authority conducted by the composer, Naxos, 1933
- La notte di Plàton, Gethsemani, Juventus, studio recording with the London Philharmonic Orchestra conducted by Aldo Ceccato, Hyperion, 2001
- Piano works, studio recording, Alessandro Marangoni, piano; Bottega Discantica, 2007
- Mille e una notte, studio recording with the Gewandhausorchester Leipzig conducted by Riccardo Chailly, Decca, 2012
- Suite Op.2, Juventus, La notte di Plàton, Gethsemani, studio recording with the Philadelphia Orchestra conducted by Yannick Nézet-Séguin, Deutsche Grammophon, 2023

== Family connections ==
De Sabata's daughter Eliana (a film screenwriter) is married to conductor Aldo Ceccato, who was also de Sabata's pupil.

His granddaughter, Isabella de Sabata, was married to conductor John Eliot Gardiner. His grandson, Cristiano Ceccato de Sabata, son of Eliana, is a former student of CAD pioneer John Frazer and worked for architects Frank Gehry and Zaha Hadid. His second grandson, Francesco Ceccato de Sabata, is the CEO of Barclays Europe.

== Quotes ==
- "I have in my mind a million notes, and every one which is not perfect makes me mad."
- "Conducting is a beastly profession."

== Spelling of name ==
The capitalizations Victor de Sabata and Victor De Sabata are both found, and the first name is often given in the Italian form Vittorio, especially in Italy. However, examples of the conductor's autograph signature clearly show that he spelt his name Victor de Sabata with a lower-case "d", and contemporary playbills indicate that he used the first name Victor, even when performing in Italy.

== Notable premieres ==
In concert

- Maurice Ravel, L'enfant et les sortilèges, Monte Carlo, 21 March 1925

On record

- Claude Debussy, Jeux, Orchestra of the Accademia di Santa Cecilia, Rome, His Master's Voice, 1947

== Bibliography ==
- Badal, James Jessen (1996). Recording the Classics: Maestros, Music, and Technology. Kent, Ohio: Kent State University Press. ISBN 978-0-87338-542-8.
- Boyden, Matthew (2002). The Rough Guide to Opera. London: Rough Guides. ISBN 978-1-85828-749-2.
- Lebrecht, Norman (2001). The Maestro Myth: Great Conductors in Pursuit of Power (revised ed.). New York: Citadel. ISBN 978-0-8065-2088-9.
- Osborne, Richard (2000). Herbert Von Karajan: A Life in Music. Boston, Massachusetts: Northeastern University Press. ISBN 978-1-55553-425-7.
- Ravel, Maurice; Arbie Orenstein (2003). A Ravel Reader: Correspondence, Articles, Interviews. Mineola, NY: Dover Publications. ISBN 978-0-486-43078-2.

Cultural offices
Preceded by Arturo Toscanini	Musical Directors, La Scala, Milan; 1930–1953	Succeeded by Carlo Maria Giulini
