= Bülent Bezdüz =

Turkish operatic tenor

Bülent Bezdüz (born 1967 in Ankara) is a Turkish operatic tenor.

Bezdüz graduated from Gazi University’s Department of Music and started his vocal studies with Polish tenor Roman Werlinski. He was helped by Hüseyin Akbulut, director-general of the Turkish State Opera and Ballet. He decided to take the exam at the Mersin State Opera and Ballet and made his debut there as Alfredo in Verdi's La Traviata.

In 1997, he attended the European Opera Centre in Manchester and made his European debut in Mozart´s Lucio Silla which went on tour in England, Ireland and Denmark.

Since then, he has sung in London, Dublin, Amsterdam, Cologne, Marseille, Rennes, Nancy, Lausanne, at the Teatro Regio di Parma, Teatro Regio di Torino, Portland, Oregon, Teatro Colón de Buenos Aires, with the Canadian Opera Company in Toronto, the Istanbul State Opera as well as in several other cities in Europe.

His repertoire includes Fenton in Verdi's Falstaff and Hellenus in Berlioz's Les Troyens, both of which he has recorded with the London Symphony Orchestra under Sir Colin Davis, Ottavio in Mozart's Don Giovanni, Rodolfo in La Bohème, and the title role in Gounod's Faust. He is ideally suited to the operas of Donizetti and has sung the following roles: Alamiro in Belisario, Gennaro in Lucrezia Borgia, Leicester in Maria Stuarda and the title role in Roberto Devereux, Nemorino in L'elisir d'amore and Edgardo in Lucia di Lammermoor in May–June 2007 for Scottish Opera.

== Discography ==
Bulent Bezduz participated in two opera recordings conducted by Sir Colin Davis: Berlioz Les Troyens (in the role of Hellenus) and Verdi Falstaff (role of Fenton) which won three Grammy Awards in 2002 and 2006:

- Berlioz Les Troyens. Sir Colin Davis LSO Live 2002
- Verdi Falstaff. Sir Colin Davis LSO Live 2004
- Puccini Discoveries. Riccardo Chailly Decca 2004
