= Tosca (1953 EMI recording) =

Reissue of original 1953 LP cover

The 1953 EMI recording of Giacomo Puccini's Tosca conducted by Victor de Sabata, with Maria Callas, Giuseppe Di Stefano and Tito Gobbi, is considered by many opera critics to be one of the most notable opera recordings of the 1950s. It was recorded in August 1953 by the EMI subsidiary Columbia Records and released to critical acclaim. It was a commercial success from the start and continues to be one of the best-selling opera recordings.

An anecdote regarding the recording sessions relates that de Sabata, who was generally pleased with Callas's performance, was not satisfied with her reading of the line "E avanti a lui tremava tutta Roma". Producer Walter Legge wrote that de Sabata put Callas through the "grinding mill" for half an hour to get it just right, though in Legge's view it was time well spent.

The work of all three lead singers, Callas as Tosca, Tito Gobbi as Scarpia and Giuseppe Di Stefano as Cavaradossi has been nearly universally praised, as has the "spaciously lyrical" conducting of de Sabata. Walter Legge's production and "superbly balanced" mono recording have also been noted as aspects that have made this Tosca one of the most celebrated of classical recordings. Soprano Leontyne Price and justice Ruth Bader Ginsburg named Callas' Tosca as their favourite recording. When Herbert von Karajan was making his own recording of Tosca in 1962, he would often ask his producer John Culshaw to play selections from the de Sabata/Callas recording to him. Culshaw reports that "One exceptionally tricky passage for the conductor is the entry of Tosca in act 3, where Puccini's tempo directions can best be described as elastic. Karajan listened to de Sabata several times over during that passage and then said, 'No, he's right but I can't do that. That's his secret.'"

In 2020, the recording was selected by the Library of Congress for preservation in the National Recording Registry for being "culturally, historically, or aesthetically significant".
