= Tito Gobbi =

Italian baritone (1913–1984)

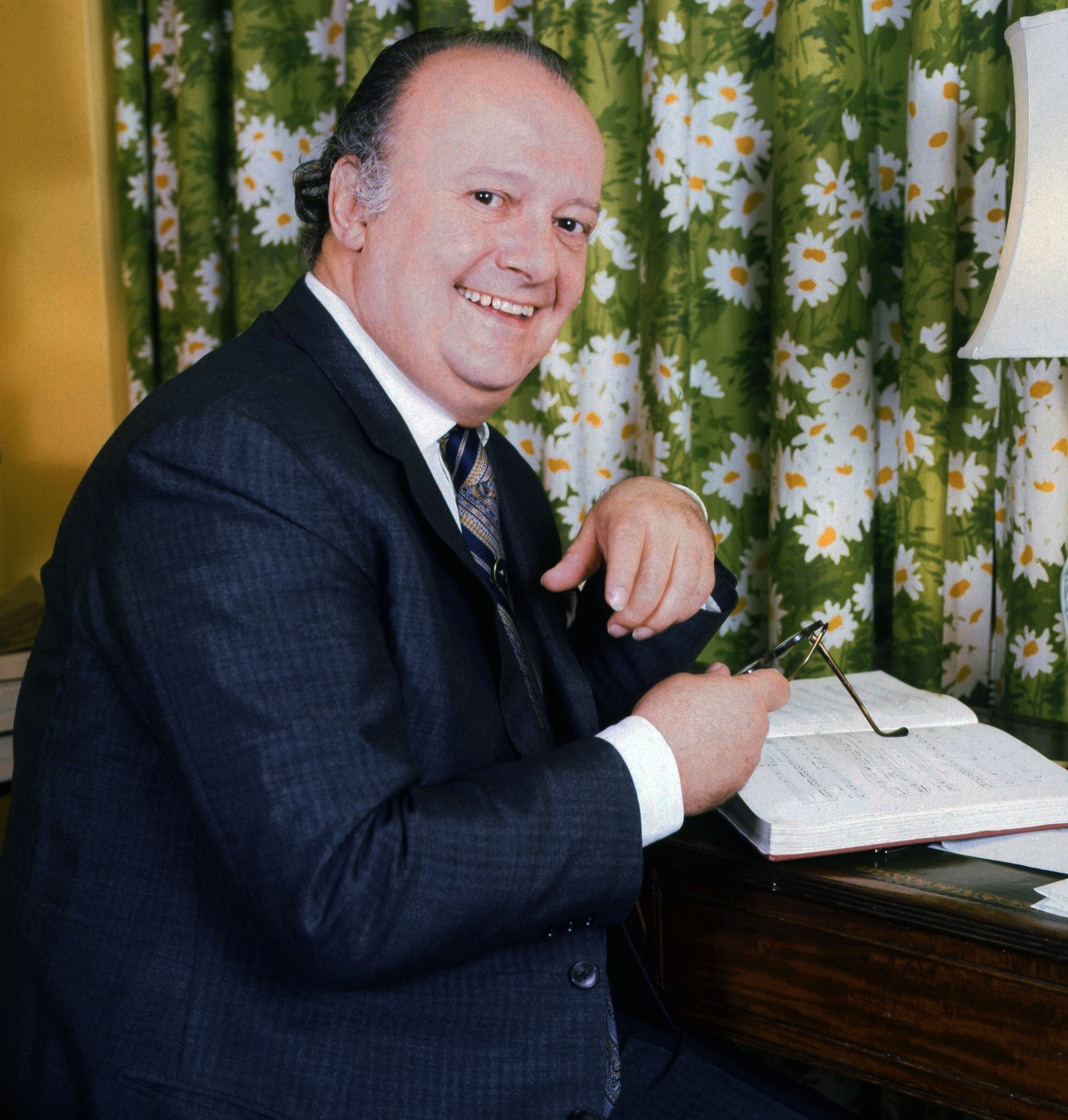
Gobbi in 1973 (photo by Allan Warren)

Tito Gobbi (24 October 1913 – 5 March 1984) was an Italian operatic baritone with an international reputation.

He made his operatic debut in Gubbio in 1935 as Count Rodolfo in Bellini's La sonnambula and quickly appeared in Italy's major opera houses. By the time he retired in 1979 he had acquired a repertoire of almost 100 operatic roles. They ranged from Mozart's mid-range baritone roles through Rossini's Barber through Donizetti and the standard Verdi and Puccini baritone roles to Alban Berg's Wozzeck. He had a worldwide career as operatic baritone, appearing in (or recording the singing role) for over 25 films and, from the mid-1960s onward, was the stage director for about ten different operas which were given close to 35 productions throughout Europe and North America, including a significant number in Chicago for the Lyric Opera of Chicago.

Gobbi and his wife, Tilde De Rensis, had a daughter, Cecilia, who now runs the "Associazione Musicale Tito Gobbi", an organization devoted to preserving and celebrating the record of her father's contribution to opera. He was also the brother-in-law of one of his famous colleagues at Covent Garden, the Bulgarian-born bass Boris Christoff. Gobbi retired in 1979 and died in Rome in 1984, aged 70.

== Early life ==
Tito Gobbi (1947 photo dedication)

Tito Gobbi was born in Bassano del Grappa. He began his studies in law at the University of Padua and, during that time, his talent was discovered by a family friend, Baron Agostino Zanchetta, who suggested that he study singing. To do so, Gobbi moved to Rome in 1932 to study under Giulio Crimi, a well-known Italian tenor of a previous generation, who had sung in the first performances of Puccini's Il trittico as well as in Zandonai's Francesca da Rimini. Accompanying Gobbi on the piano at his first audition was Tilde De Rensis, daughter of musicologist Raphael De Rensis. In 1937, she became his wife.

== Operatic career ==
=== Early years ===
After his 1935 debut in Gubbio singing the role of Count Rodolfo in Vincenzo Bellini's La sonnambula, in 1937 he sang Germont in La traviata for the first time in Rome at Teatro Adriano. But working at La Scala in Milan for the 1935–1936 season as an understudy, gave him a breadth of experience and his first appearance there on stage was as the Herald in Ildebrando Pizzetti's Orsèolo. In 1942, he debuted at the house in the role of Belcore in Donizetti's L'elisir d'amore conducted by Tullio Serafin. It was under Serafin's guidance and direction that the young Gobbi prepared many roles, including some that would become crucial to his later career; these included Scarpia, Rigoletto, Simon Boccanegra. He also appeared at the Rome Opera from 1938 onward in stage productions such as singing the role of Sharpless in Madama Butterfly under conductor Victor de Sabata.

Other significant Italian venues in these pre-war years included La Fenice in Venice where, in 1941 he appeared as Marcello in La bohème and in 1942 as Sharpless. At the Teatro Communale in Florence in 1941 he sang the role of Hidraot in Gluck's Armide, while at the Teatro Verdi in Trieste in 1942 and 1943 there were other performances, including those as the title character in L'Orfeo.

In Rome in 1942 he performed his first Falstaff at La Scala under de Sabata and, in direct contrast, was the protagonist in Alban Berg's Wozzeck sung in November. These performances made him famous in the first Italian performances of Berg's opera. He sang the role again later in Italy and in Vienna under Karl Böhm.

During these years, Gobbi also kept busy working in films, some of which were filmed operas such as Cilea's L'arlesiana with Licia Albanese in 1938.

=== Post-World War II ===
In 1948 he took part in the Italian redub of the Laurel and Hardy film The Devil's Brother, based on the opera Fra Diavolo by Daniel Auber: he provided the singing voice for actor-singer Dennis King (in the role of Fra Diavolo) for the song "Fra Diavolo" and other musical parts, replacing Giulio Panicali, who dubbed King in the dialogues.

Gobbi's international career blossomed after World War II, with appearances in 1948 at the San Francisco Opera. He performed for the first time at London's Royal Opera House, Covent Garden, in 1950 and sang with the Lyric Opera of Chicago from 1954 until 1974. He made his Metropolitan Opera debut in 1956 as Scarpia in Tosca. The year 1974 also saw the last of Gobbi's numerous appearances at Covent Garden, where he had been much admired by the public and critics alike for his sensitive musicianship as well as for his acting talent and interpretive insights.

There was, however, one incident in his relationship with Covent Garden which caused a stir. In 1955 he had been engaged as Iago in a major new production of Verdi's Otello but was delayed in reaching the theatre for rehearsal. The new music director, Rafael Kubelík, determined to impose discipline on singers, sacked him. The company baritone Otakar Kraus, already scheduled to sing some performances, took on all of them. However, a few weeks later Gobbi and Kubelik met at a party and Kubelik made an unqualified apology. The general feeling was that Kubelik was right in principle as some star singers were often reluctant to rehearse, but chose the wrong singer and circumstances, as few were more professional than Gobbi. He was back at Covent Garden as Rigoletto the following summer.

=== Gobbi's career in films ===
Early in his career he appeared in a number of motion pictures between 1937 and 1959, including some filmed operas such as The Barber of Seville (in 1946 starring Ferruccio Tagliavini) as well a contemporary drama in 1946, Before Him All Rome Trembled. There was also the popular 1949 British drama set in wartime Italy, The Glass Mountain, which made him known to a wide public. Also, in 1950, he played himself, in the British film Soho Conspiracy. By the time of his death, Gobbi had appeared in some 25 films, in both singing and speaking parts. Beginning in the 1940s, Gobbi provided the singing voice for Anthony Quinn as Alfio in the film Cavalleria rusticana (1953), as well as the voice of the title character in the 1957 film Rigoletto e la sua tragedia.

=== Gobbi as stage director ===
During the 1960s, Gobbi diversified into stage directing, a notable example being the December 1965 production of Verdi's Simon Boccanegra at Covent Garden, which was intended to be his first, but which he staged for Chicago a short while before. In addition, he sang the title role in each of three productions he directed, the last being in Rome in 1975. It has been observed that Gobbi's evident love of the opera "both on stage and on disc...was one of his most towering achievements".

Overall, between 1965 and 1982, he directed productions of about ten different operas, the largest number of which were of Tosca. Others included The Barber of Seville (presented three times in Chicago between 1969 and 1977); Otello (with three productions in Pasadena, California (1966), Chicago (1966), and Thessalonika, Greece in 1978); and Gianni Schicchi (given in Florence and at the Edinburgh Festival in 1969; at the Chicago Lyric in 1970; and in Zurich (1974) and Monaco in 1982). The ten operas were staged for a total of nearly forty times by opera companies in Europe and North America, most notably in America for the Lyric Opera of Chicago for which he directed nine of the ten.

=== Famous roles ===
Tito Gobbi as Scarpia in Puccini's Tosca, 1954

According to Gobbi, he sang the part of Scarpia in Puccini's Tosca "nearly a thousand times". One significant production was the "event of worldwide interest" (as Gobbi himself describes it), Franco Zeffirelli's production of Tosca at the Royal Opera House, Covent Garden in London in February 1964. In a return to that house, Soprano Maria Callas sang the title role, conducted by Carlo Felice Cillario. Act 2 of the production was broadcast live on British television on 9 February 1964 in what must be one of the most acclaimed dramatic interpretations of all recorded operatic repertoire. It is now preserved on DVD.

Gobbi and Callas had previously sung Tosca together in a classic 1953 EMI recording of the opera made in Milan, with Giuseppe Di Stefano as Cavaradossi and Victor de Sabata conducting. That 1953 album was re-issued on long-playing gramophone record and, later, on CD. It is considered by many to be the finest recording of a complete opera ever made. It went out of print only once, after Callas recorded the role again in stereo in 1964; but the 1953 mono version was soon re-released and is the one that remains readily available to this day. Gobbi was a close friend, collaborator, and admirer of Callas, and he was interviewed several times about their various stage collaborations, noting in his book that "with Maria it was not performing but living".

He was also famous for his many performances in the roles of Iago and Falstaff, several of which are available on CD. Less well-known but equally impressive are his performances of Mozart roles, in particular the title role in Don Giovanni and the role of the Count in The Marriage of Figaro.

In 1968 he participated in the first opera telecast in Australia (Tosca, with Marie Collier in the title role and Donald Smith as Cavaradossi).

== Publications ==
In retirement, Gobbi turned to writing and produced two books, the first of which, Tito Gobbi: My Life, was his autobiography. With this he was helped by the ghost-writer Ida Cook; it appeared in 1979. Five years later, he wrote Tito Gobbi and His World of Italian Opera in which he examined many of the operas in which he either performed or which he directed (or both) and provided background information on them and their composers as well as discussing the productions themselves.

In the case of Tosca, he devotes a chapter in Tito Gobbi and His World of Italian Opera to an analytical examination of each character in the opera (even the minor ones) and, for Scarpia, whom he states "I can fairly claim to know pretty well.." he devotes three pages to a detailed examination of the character as Gobbi has observed and played him over many years.

== Abridged discography ==
- Berg: Wozzeck (Dow, Munteanu, Tajo, Picchi; Sanzogno, 1954) Myto
- Donizetti: L'elisir d'amore (Carosio, Monti; Santini, 1952) EMI
- Donizetti: Lucia di Lammermoor (Callas, Di Stefano; Serafin, 1953) EMI
- Giordano: Fedora (Olivero, Del Monaco; Gardelli, 1969) Decca Records
- Leoncavallo: Pagliacci (Callas, Di Stefano; Serafin, 1954) EMI
- Leoncavallo: Pagliacci (Amara, Corelli; Matačić, 1960) EMI
- Franco Leoni: L'oracolo (Sutherland, Tourangeau; Bonynge, 1975) Decca Records
- Mascagni: Cavalleria rusticana (Souliotis, Del Monaco; Varviso, 1966) Decca Records
- Mozart: Don Giovanni (Welitsch, Schwarzkopf, Kunz, Seefried, Greindl; Furtwängler, 1950) Archipel
- Mozart: The Marriage of Figaro A live performance from Covent Garden, 1963, conducted by Georg Solti. Gobbi plays the Count. Published by operadepot.com.
- Puccini: La bohème (Scotto, Poggi; Votto, 1961) Deutsche Grammophon
- Puccini: Gianni Schicchi (de los Ángeles, del Monte; Santini, 1958) EMI
- Puccini: Gianni Schicchi (Cotrubas, Domingo; Maazel, 1976) CBS/Sony
- Puccini: Madama Butterfly (de los Ángeles, Di Stefano; Gavazzeni, 1954) EMI
- Puccini: La fanciulla del West (Corelli, Frazzoni, Ricciardi; Votto 1956) IMD
- Puccini: Il tabarro (Mas, Prandelli; Bellezza, 1955) EMI
- Puccini: Tosca (Callas, Di Stefano; de Sabata, 1953) EMI
- Puccini: Tosca, Act 2. Live video recording at the Royal Opera House, London, 1964
- Puccini: Tosca (Callas, Bergonzi; Prêtre, 1964) EMI
- Puccini: Le Villi (Scotto, Domingo, Nucci; Maazel, 1979) CBS/Sony
- Rossini: Il barbiere di Siviglia (Callas, Alva; Galliera, 1957) EMI
- Richard Strauss: Salome (Fiorenzo Tasso, Maria Benedetti, Lily Djanel; Alfredo Simonetto, 1952) MYTO
- Verdi: Aida (Callas, Barbieri, Tucker; Serafin, 1955) EMI
- Verdi: Un ballo in maschera (Callas, Ratti, Barbieri, Di Stefano; Votto, 1956) EMI
- Verdi: Don Carlos (Stella, Nicolai, Filippeschi, Christoff; Santini, 1954) EMI
- Verdi: Don Carlos (Brouwenstijn, Vickers, Christoff, Barbieri; Giulini 1958) MYTO
- Verdi: Falstaff (Schwarzkopf; Karajan, 1956) EMI
- Verdi: Nabucco (Souliotis, Prevedi; Gardelli, 1965) Decca Records
- Verdi: Otello (Rysanek, Pirazzini, Vickers; Serafin, 1960) RCA
- Verdi: Rigoletto (Callas, Di Stefano; Serafin, 1955) EMI
- Verdi: Simon Boccanegra (de los Ángeles, Campora, Christoff; Santini, 1957) EMI
- Verdi: La traviata (Stella, Di Stefano; Serafin, 1955) EMI

== Selected filmography ==
- Forbidden Music (1942)
- Before Him All Rome Trembled (1946)
- O sole mio (1946)
- The Barber of Seville (1947)
- Mad About Opera (1948)
- The Lady of the Camellias (1947)
- The Glass Mountain (1949)
- The Force of Destiny (1950)
- Soho Conspiracy (1950)
- The Firebird (1952)
