= Carlo Maria Giulini =

Italian conductor (1914–2005)

Carlo Maria Giulini OMRI
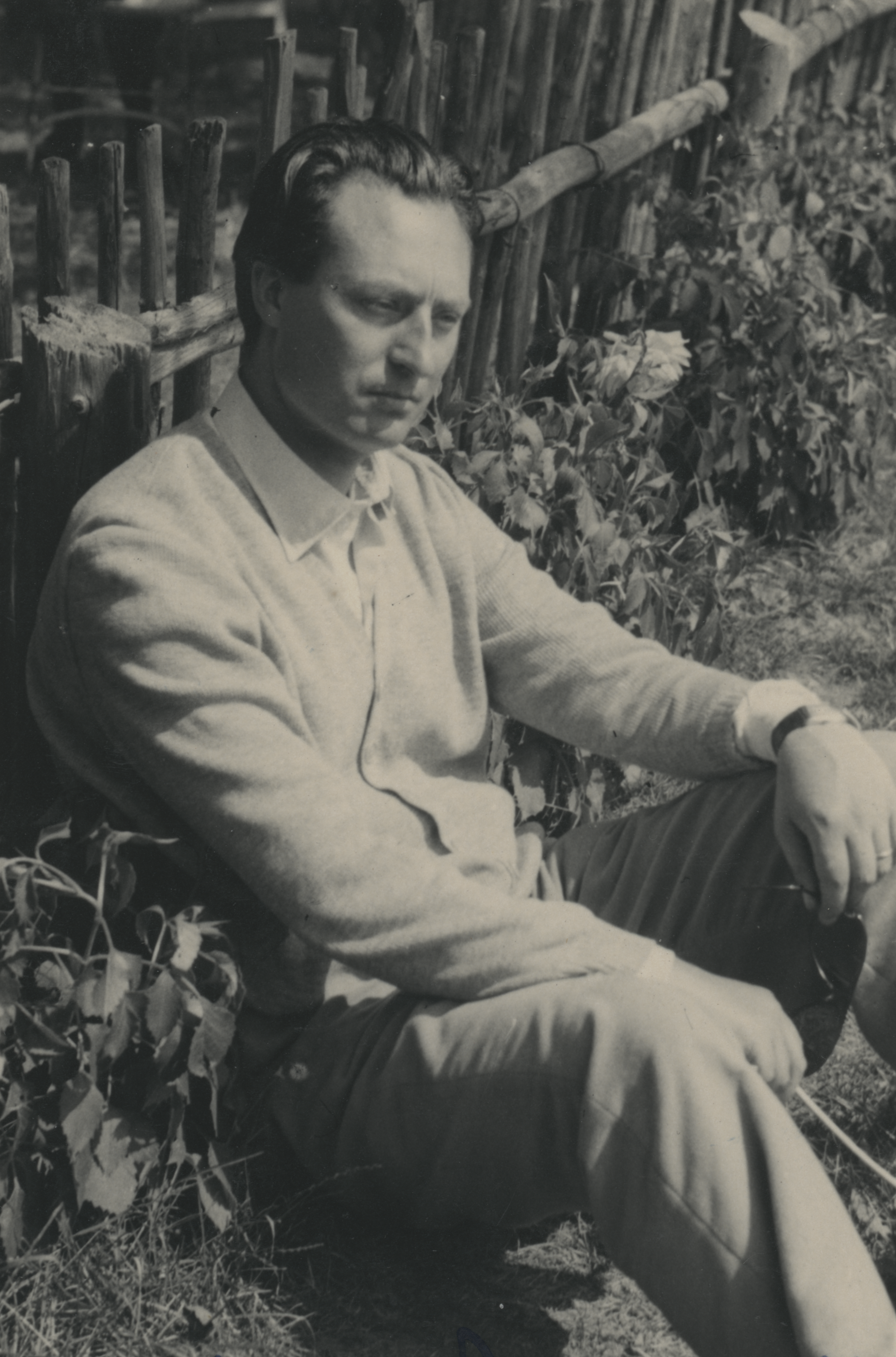
- Giulini in 1950
- Born: 9 May 1914; Barletta, Apulia, Kingdom of Italy
- Died: 14 June 2005 (aged 91); Brescia, Lombardy, Italy
- Resting place: Municipal Cemetery, Bolzano, South Tyrol, Italy
- Education: Conservatorio Santa Cecilia
- Occupation: Conductor
- Years active: 1944–1998 (54 years)
- Spouse: Marcella de Girolami (m. 1942; died 1995)

Carlo Maria Giulini (Italian: [ˈkarlo maˈriːa dʒuˈliːni]; 9 May 1914 – 14 June 2005) was an Italian conductor. From the age of five, when he began to play the violin, Giulini's musical education was expanded when he began to study at Italy's foremost conservatory, the Conservatorio Santa Cecilia in Rome at the age of 16. Initially, he studied the viola and conducting; then, following an audition, he won a place in the Orchestra dell'Accademia Nazionale di Santa Cecilia.

Although he won a conducting competition two years later, he was unable to take advantage of the prize, which was the opportunity to conduct, because he was forced to join the army during World War II despite being a pacifist. As the war was ending, he hid until the liberation to avoid continuing to fight alongside the Germans. While in hiding, he married his girlfriend, Marcella, and they remained together until her death in 1995. Together, they had three children.

After the 1944 liberation, he was invited to lead what was then known as the Augusteo Orchestra (now the Santa Cecilia Orchestra) in its first post-Fascist concert, and quickly other conducting opportunities came along. These included some of the world's major orchestras, including the Chicago Symphony Orchestra, London's Philharmonia Orchestra, the Los Angeles Philharmonic and the Vienna Philharmonic. His career spanned 54 years, with retirement coming in 1998. He died in Brescia, Italy, at 91 years of age.

== Early life ==
Giulini was born in Barletta, in Apulia, Italy, to a father from Lombardy and a mother from Naples; he was raised in Bolzano, which at the time of his birth was part of Austria – it became Italian following a provision included in the Treaty of London, with the end of First World War in 1919. Therefore, most of the neighbors spoke a dialect of German, and the local music he heard tended to be Austrian/Tyrolean. He recalled being transfixed by the town band.

Carlo Maria Giulini's birthplace in 2026, Barletta, Italy

For Christmas in 1919, when he was five, Giulini was given a violin and he progressed rapidly with local instructors, notably a Bohemian violinist (and local pharmacist) whom he called "Brahms". In 1928, the distinguished Italian violinist/composer Remy Prìncipe (1889–1977) gave a recital in Bolzano, and auditioned Giulini; he invited Giulini to study with him at Italy's foremost conservatory, the Conservatorio Santa Cecilia in Rome. Giulini undertook his studies there two years later, at the age of 16. He studied viola with Principe, composition with Alessandro Bustini (1876–1970), and conducting with Bernardino Molinari.

At the age of 18, in order to supplement his family's income (which had been depleted by the Great Depression), he auditioned for the viola section of the Orchestra dell'Accademia Nazionale di Santa Cecilia, at the time Italy's foremost orchestra. He recalled crying for joy when informed that he had won the audition and would be the orchestra's last-desk violist.

Among the guest conductors he played under were Bruno Walter, Wilhelm Furtwängler, Richard Strauss, Victor de Sabata, Fritz Reiner, Pierre Monteux, Igor Stravinsky, and Otto Klemperer. His first public performance was the First Symphony of Brahms under Walter. Giulini told interviewers that he loved the gentle manner of Walter, who he said had a gift for making every musician feel important.

== Career ==
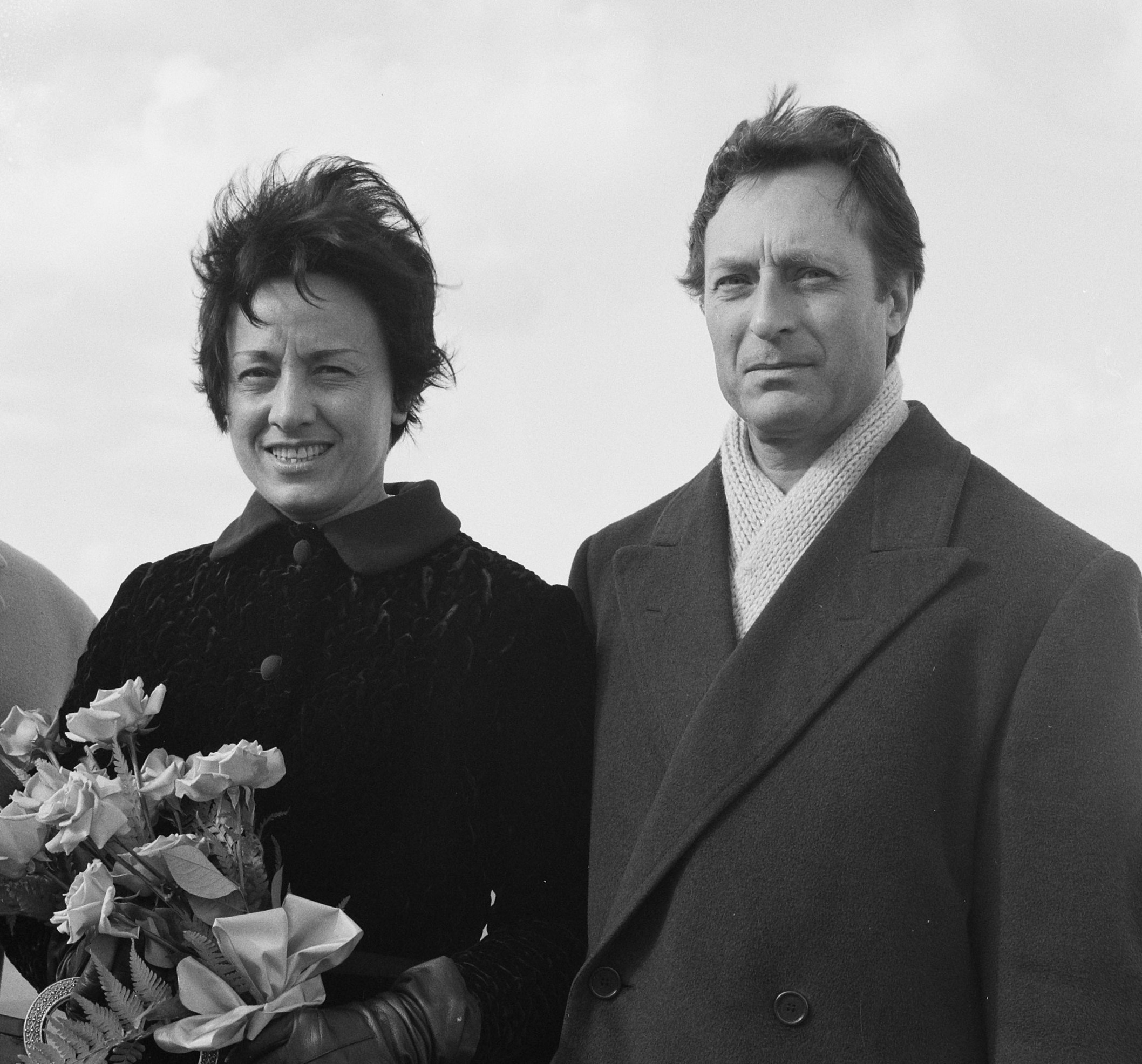
De Girolami and Giulini in the Netherlands in 1965

In 1940, Giulini won a conducting competition, whose prize was the chance to conduct the St. Cecilia orchestra, but before the concert, Giulini was drafted into the Italian army, made a second lieutenant, and sent to the front in Croatia. However, because of his commitment to pacifism and intense opposition to fascism and to Benito Mussolini, he did not fire his gun at human targets.

In 1942, on a 30-day break in Rome, he married Marcella de Girolami (1921–1995), his girlfriend since 1938; they remained together until her death 53 years later. In September 1943, the Armistice between Italy and Allied armed forces was signed, but the Nazi occupation refused to abandon Rome, and Giulini's Italian commander ordered his troops to fight with the Nazis. Giulini chose instead to go into hiding, living for nine months in a tunnel underneath a home owned by his wife's uncle, along with two friends and a Jewish family which was avoiding Nazi arrest and deportation. Posters around Rome with his face and name instructed that he be shot on sight.

After the Allies liberated Rome on 4 June 1944, Giulini—who was among the few conductors not tainted by associations with Fascism—was chosen to lead the Accademia's first post-Fascist concert, held on 16 July 1944. On the program was the Brahms Symphony No. 4, which he had studied while in hiding. It became the work he conducted most frequently over the course of his career, with a total of 180 performances.

Giulini began working with the Chamber Orchestra of Rome in 1944, and was made its music director in 1946. Also in 1944 he became assistant conductor of the RAI (Italian Radio) Orchestra in Rome, becoming its principal conductor in 1946. Four years later he was involved in the founding of the Milan Radio Orchestra, working with them from 1946 to 1954, as well as with the RAI's Rome orchestra.

=== Giulini and conducting opera ===
Although Giulini conducted La traviata for Italian radio in 1948, he conducted his first staged opera in 1950 in Bergamo. It was La traviata and he returned the following year, this time with Maria Callas and Renata Tebaldi alternating in the role of Violetta. Also, he revived several obscure operas, including works by Alessandro Scarlatti. His work in Bergamo came to the attention of Arturo Toscanini, who asked to meet the young conductor, and the two men formed a deep bond. Toscanini recommended Giulini for the musical directorship at La Scala; Giulini had also won the attention and support of Victor de Sabata, the principal conductor of La Scala, who engaged him as his assistant. Giulini conducted his first opera at La Scala, Falla's La vida breve, in February 1952 and succeeded De Sabata as its music director in 1953 after a heart attack caused the older man to leave the position.

In his five years in the position, Giulini conducted 13 productions, which included:

three marking the operatic debut of the producer Franco Zeffirelli, L'Italiana in Algeri, La Cenerentola and L'elisir d'amore; and Gluck's Alceste and a La traviata with Maria Callas, the latter in a superb production by Luchino Visconti. It was at this period that Giulini was first able to work with colleagues who shared his views about the relationship of music and the stage in opera, and the results were spectacular: the Traviata, originally scheduled for four performances in 1955, had to be allotted another 17 in the following season.

Though highly admired, he resigned after members of the audience jeered Maria Callas during a run of operas from 16 February to 27 April 1956.

His UK debut took place at the 1955 Edinburgh Festival conducting Verdi's Falstaff for the Glyndebourne Opera company when it toured to that city.

In 1958, Giulini conducted a highly acclaimed production of Verdi's Don Carlos at the Royal Opera House, Covent Garden (directed by Visconti), where it was also noted that "what emerged under Giulini's baton was a consistent, convincing masterpiece of astonishing power and lyrical tension." Although he returned to Covent Garden in 1957, it became clear that, after two more Covent Garden performances in 1961 and 1967 (the famous black-and-white La Traviata) and another at the Holland Festival in 1965, where he disagreed so strongly with the visual treatment of The Marriage of Figaro on the stage that he refused to conduct, and only concert performances were given, Giulini would abandon opera, not wanting to compromise his artistic vision. Almost without exception from then on, he concentrated on orchestral works.

As illustrated, his relationships with opera managements were not always of the best: The Telegraph reported that "he rebelled against the decor and production of a Don Giovanni at the Edinburgh Festival, conducting it with a minimum of scenery; and in 1968, after a production of Mozart's The Marriage of Figaro in Rome, he became so disenchanted with the management of opera that he was not seen in an opera house for 14 years."

The New York Times summed up Giulini's approach to working in the area of operas as follows:

By the late 1960s, Mr. Giulini had grown disheartened with working in opera houses, where he said he had to contend with insufficient rehearsal time, musically obtuse directors and too many singers interested more in jet-setting international careers than in substantive work. He restricted his appearances, and even the Metropolitan Opera was never able to engage him.

=== Giulini as orchestra conductor ===
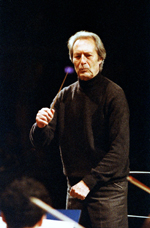
Giulini conducting in Perugia in 1992

Giulini expanded his repertoire at a careful pace, not conducting the symphonies of Mozart and Beethoven until the 1960s. During the 1960s, he was in great demand as a guest conductor of leading orchestras around the world, and made numerous well-received recordings with the Philharmonia Orchestra of London and several others.

In 1955 he had made his American debut with the Chicago Symphony Orchestra, leading to a 23-year association with the orchestra; he was its principal guest conductor from 1969 to 1972, although he continued to appear with them regularly until 18 March 1978. In 1956, he began his association with the Philharmonia of London and the Royal Opera House, Covent Garden.

In addition to his role in Chicago, he was music director of the Vienna Symphony from 1973 to 1976. From 1978 to 1984, he served as principal conductor and music director of the Los Angeles Philharmonic, launching his tenure there with performances of Beethoven's 9th Symphony. He debuted with the Los Angeles Philharmonic in 1970 conducting Mahler's First Symphony and Mendelssohn's Violin Concerto with Pinchas Zuckerman. In 1982 he returned once more to opera, conducting a widely acclaimed production of Verdi's Falstaff with the Los Angeles Philharmonic.

Overall, his impact on the musical world of the mid-to-late 20th century is summed up by Anthony Tommasini in his New York Times obituary of 2005:

Far from being an autocratic conductor or a kinetic dynamo of the podium, Mr. Giulini was a probing musician who achieved results by projecting serene authority and providing a model of selfless devotion to the score. His symphonic performances were at once magisterial and urgent, full of surprise yet utterly natural. He brought breadth and telling detail to the operas of Mozart and Verdi.

=== Notable recordings ===
Giulini's most notable opera recordings include the 1959 Philharmonia Orchestra and Chorus versions of Mozart's operas The Marriage of Figaro and Don Giovanni for EMI, as well as his live 1955 recording of Verdi's La traviata with Maria Callas. He also made recordings of Verdi's Requiem and the Four Sacred Pieces, which were highly praised.

Admired orchestral records include Debussy's La mer and Nocturnes, Dvořák's 9th Symphony and Tchaikovsky's 6th Symphony with the Philharmonia Orchestra, Mussorgsky's Pictures at an Exhibition, Brahms's 4th Symphony and Mahler's 1st and 9th symphonies with the Chicago Symphony Orchestra, Beethoven's 3rd and 5th Symphonies, and Schumann's 3rd Symphony with the Los Angeles Philharmonic Orchestra, Mahler's Das Lied von der Erde with the Berlin Philharmonic Orchestra, Brahms's four Symphonies and German requiem, and Anton Bruckner's 7th, 8th and 9th symphonies with the Vienna Philharmonic, Dvořák's 7th and 9th Symphonies with the Royal Concertgebouw Orchestra of Amsterdam, and Schubert's 8th and 9th Symphonies with the Bavarian Radio Symphony. Most of these discs were recorded for the Deutsche Grammophon label. His live recording of Britten's War Requiem made in the Royal Albert Hall in 1969 which is available as a BBC Legends recording was a Gramophone Award winner.

== Awards and recognitions ==
- Gramophone Award
  - 1981 Beethoven Violin Concerto in D Major; Itzhak Perlman / Philharmonia Orchestra (EMI Classics)
- Grammy Award for Best Choral Performance
  - 1981 Mozart: Requiem; Norbert Balatsch (choirmaster) / Philharmonia Orchestra & Chorus
- Grammy Award for Best Classical Album
  - 1979 Brahms: Concerto For Violin in D; Itzhak Perlman / Chicago Symphony Orchestra
- Grammy Award for Best Engineered Album, Classical
  - 1965 Britten: The Young Person's Guide to the Orchestra; Philharmonia Orchestra
- Grammy Award for Best Instrumental Soloist Performance
  - 1989 Mozart: Piano Concerto No. 23; Vladimir Horowitz / La Scala Orchestra
- Grammy Award for Best Orchestral Performance
  - 1972 Mahler: Symphony No. 1 in D; Chicago Symphony Orchestra
  - 1978 Mahler: Symphony No. 9 in D; Chicago Symphony Orchestra
- Honorary Member of the Royal Academy of Music (1972)

== See also ==
- Don Giovanni (Giulini recording)
- Recordings of the Los Angeles Philharmonic Orchestra under Carlo Maria Giulini

Discography integral www.giulini.fr

Cultural offices
Preceded by Victor de Sabata	Musical Directors, La Scala, Milan; 1953–1956	Succeeded by Guido Cantelli
