= Elisabeth Schwarzkopf =

German-born opera soprano (1915–2006)

Dame Elisabeth Schwarzkopf DBE
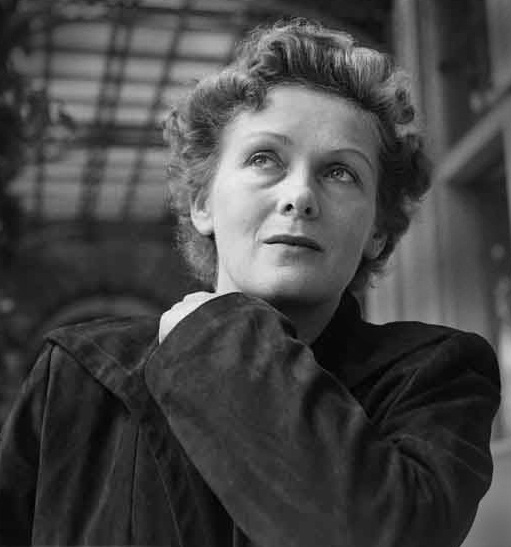
- Born: Olga Maria Elisabeth Friederike Schwarzkopf; 9 December 1915; Kesselberg, Kingdom of Prussia, German Empire (now Jarocin, Poland)
- Died: 3 August 2006 (aged 90); Schruns, Vorarlberg, Austria
- Citizenship: Germany; Austria; United Kingdom
- Occupations: Classical soprano; Voice teacher
- Organizations: Deutsche Oper Berlin; Vienna State Opera; Salzburg Festival
- Title: Kammersängerin; Honorary member of the Royal Swedish Academy of Music; Honorary member of the Vienna State Opera; Commandeur of the Ordre des Arts et des Lettres
- Awards: Lilli Lehmann Medal; Edison Award; Grand Cross of the Order of Merit of the Federal Republic of Germany; UNESCO Mozart Medal

Dame Olga Maria Elisabeth Friederike Schwarzkopf, DBE (German: [eˌliːzabɛt ˈʃvaʁt͡skɔp͡f]; 9 December 1915 – 3 August 2006) was a German-born Austro-British lyric soprano. She was among the foremost singers of lieder, and is renowned for her performances of Viennese operetta, as well as the operas of Mozart, Wagner and Richard Strauss. After retiring from the stage, she was a voice teacher internationally. She is considered one of the greatest sopranos of the 20th century.

== Early life ==
Schwarzkopf was born on 9 December 1915 in Jarotschin in the Province of Posen in Prussia, Germany (now in Poland), to Friedrich Schwarzkopf and his wife, Elisabeth (née Fröhlich). Schwarzkopf performed in her first opera in 1928, as Eurydice in a school production of Gluck's Orfeo ed Euridice in Magdeburg, Germany. In 1934, Schwarzkopf began her musical studies at the Berlin Hochschule für Musik, where her singing tutor, Lula Mysz-Gmeiner, attempted to train her to be a mezzo-soprano. Schwarzkopf later trained under Maria Ivogün, and in 1938 joined the Deutsche Oper.

== Early career ==
In 1933, shortly after the Nazis came to power, Elisabeth Schwarzkopf's father, a local school headmaster, was dismissed from his position by the new ruling authorities for having refused to allow a Nazi party meeting at his school. He was also banned from taking any new teaching post. Until Friedrich Schwarzkopf's dismissal, the probability was that the 17-year-old Elisabeth would have studied medicine after passing her Abitur; but now, as the daughter of a banned school teacher, she was not allowed to enter university and she commenced music studies at the Berlin Hochschule für Musik. Schwarzkopf made her professional debut at the Deutsche Oper Berlin (then called Deutsches Opernhaus) on 15 April 1938, as the Second Flower Maiden (First Group) in act 2 of Richard Wagner's Parsifal. In 1940 Schwarzkopf was awarded a full contract with the Deutsches Opernhaus, a condition of which was that she had to join the Nazi party.

Since the theme was brought up in the dissertation of the Austrian historian Oliver Rathkolb in 1982, the question of Schwarzkopf's relationship with the Nazi Party has been discussed repeatedly in the media and in literature. There was criticism that Schwarzkopf, not only in the years immediately after the war but also in confrontation with revelations made in the 1980s and 1990s, made contradictory statements, including in regard to her membership in the NSDAP (Member No. 7,548,960). At first, she denied this and then with varying explanations defended it. In one version, for example, she claimed that she joined the party only at the insistence of her father who, himself, had earlier lost his position as school principal after forbidding a Nazi program in the school.

Further publications discussed her musical performances during the war before Nazi party conferences and for units of the Waffen-SS. Her defenders argue in favor of her claim that she always strictly separated art from politics and that she was a non-political person.

In 1942, she was invited to sing with the Vienna State Opera, where her roles included Konstanze in Mozart's Die Entführung aus dem Serail, Musetta and later Mimì in Puccini's La bohème and Violetta in Verdi's La traviata.

Schwarzkopf sang four brief cameo roles in films produced by Reich Minister of Propaganda Joseph Goebbels, but she was a voice, not a film star.

== Post-war career ==
Schwarzkopf as Donna Elvira in Mozart's Don Giovanni

In 1947, Schwarzkopf was granted Austrian citizenship to enable her to sing abroad with the Vienna State Opera. In 1947 and 1948, Schwarzkopf appeared on tour with the Vienna State Opera at London's Royal Opera House, Covent Garden on 16 September 1947 as Donna Elvira in Mozart's Don Giovanni and at La Scala on 28 December 1948, as the Countess in Mozart's The Marriage of Figaro, which became one of her signature roles.

Schwarzkopf later made her official debut at the Royal Opera House on 16 January 1948, as Pamina in Mozart's The Magic Flute, in performances sung in English, and at La Scala on 29 June 1950 singing Beethoven's Missa solemnis. Schwarzkopf's association with the Milanese house in the early 1950s gave her the opportunity to sing certain roles on stage for the only time in her career: Mélisande in Debussy's Pelléas et Mélisande, Iole in Handel's Hercules, Marguerite in Gounod's Faust, Elsa in Wagner's Lohengrin, as well as her first Marschallin in Richard Strauss's Der Rosenkavalier and her first Fiordiligi in Mozart's Così fan tutte at the Piccola Scala. On 11 September 1951, she appeared as Anne Trulove in the world premiere of Stravinsky's The Rake's Progress. Schwarzkopf made her American concert debut with the Chicago Symphony Orchestra on 28 and 29 October 1954, in Strauss's Four Last Songs and the closing scene from Capriccio with Fritz Reiner conducting; her Carnegie Hall debut was a lied recital on 25 November 1956; her American opera debut was with the San Francisco Opera on 20 September 1955 as the Marschallin, and her debut at the Metropolitan Opera on 13 October 1964, also as the Marschallin.

Schwarzkopf as the Marschallin in Richard Strauss' Der Rosenkavalier

In March 1946, Schwarzkopf was invited to audition for Walter Legge, an influential British classical record producer and a founder of the Philharmonia Orchestra. Legge asked her to sing Hugo Wolf's lied Wer rief dich denn? and, impressed, signed her to an exclusive contract with EMI. They began a close partnership and Legge subsequently became Schwarzkopf's manager and companion. They were married on 19 October 1953 in Epsom, Surrey; Schwarzkopf thus acquired British citizenship by marriage. Schwarzkopf would divide her time between lieder recitals and opera performances for the rest of her career. When invited in 1958 to select her eight favourite records on the BBC's Desert Island Discs, Schwarzkopf chose seven of her own recordings, and an eighth of Karajan conducting the Rosenkavalier prelude, as they evoked fond memories of the people she had worked with.

In the 1960s, Schwarzkopf concentrated nearly exclusively on five operatic roles: Donna Elvira in Don Giovanni, Countess Almaviva in The Marriage of Figaro, Fiordiligi in Così fan tutte, Countess Madeleine in Strauss's Capriccio, and the Marschallin. She was also well received as Alice Ford in Verdi's Falstaff. However, on the EMI label she made several "champagne operetta" recordings like Franz Lehár's The Merry Widow and Johann Strauss II's The Gypsy Baron.

Schwarzkopf's last operatic performance was as the Marschallin on 31 December 1971, in the theatre of La Monnaie in Brussels. For the next several years, she devoted herself exclusively to lieder recitals. On 17 March 1979, Walter Legge suffered a severe heart attack. He disregarded doctor's orders to rest and attended Schwarzkopf's final recital two days later in Zurich. Three days later, he died.

== Retirement and death ==
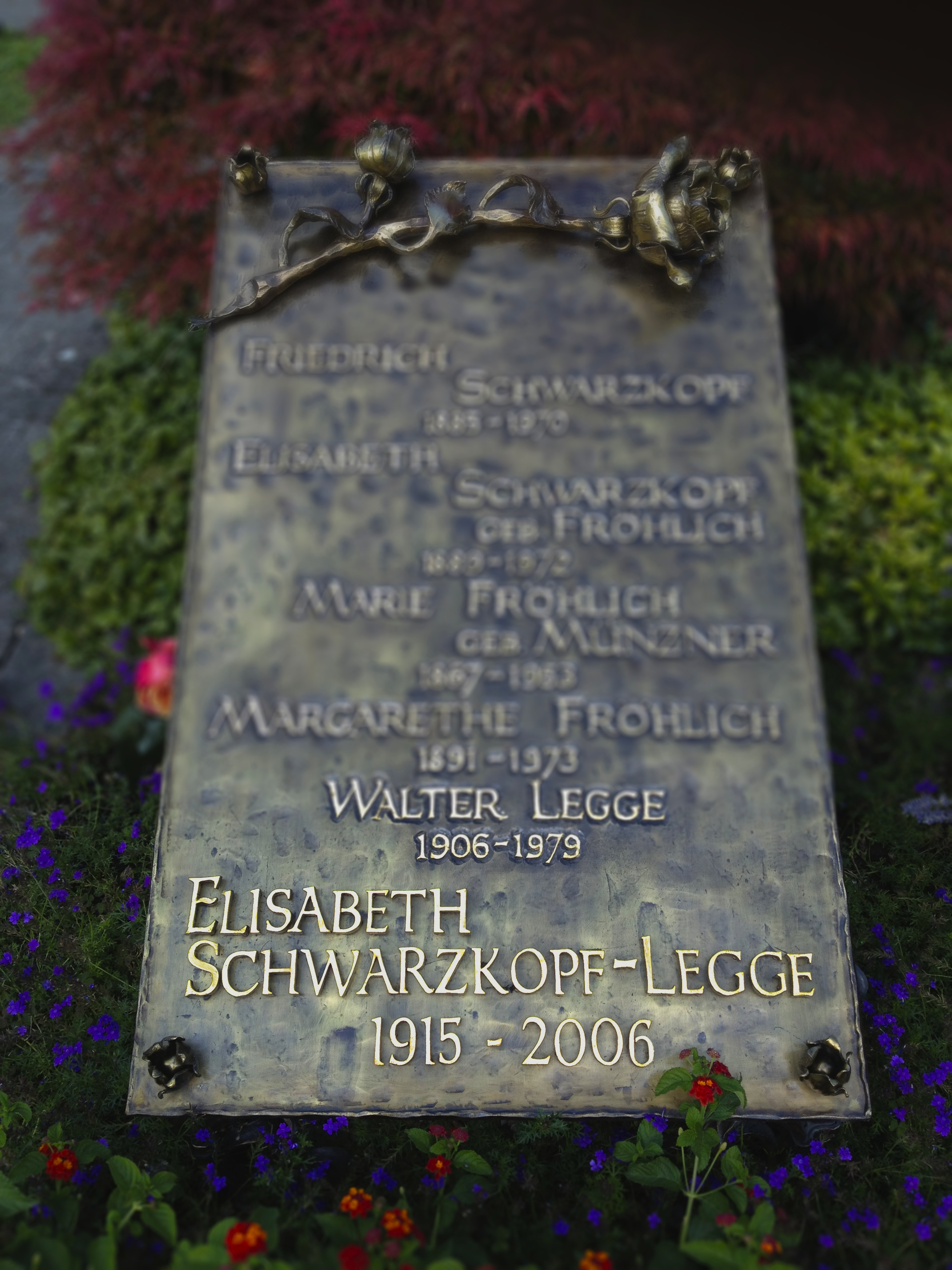
Grave in Zumikon

After retiring (almost immediately after her husband's death), Schwarzkopf taught and gave master classes around the world, notably at the Juilliard School in New York City. After living in Ascona, Switzerland, for many years, she took up residence in Austria. She was made a doctor of music by the University of Cambridge in 1976, and became a Dame Commander of the Order of the British Empire (DBE) in 1992.

Schwarzkopf died in her sleep during the night of 2–3 August 2006 at her home in Schruns, Vorarlberg, Austria, aged 90. Her ashes, and those of Walter Legge, were buried next to her parents in Zumikon near Zürich, where she had lived from 1982 to 2003.

== Legacy ==
Her discography is considerable both in quality and in quantity and is distinguished for her Mozart and Richard Strauss operatic portrayals, her two commercial recordings of Strauss's Four Last Songs and her recordings of lieder, especially those of Wolf.

Schwarzkopf is generally considered to have been the greatest German lyric soprano of the twentieth century and one of the finest Mozart singers of all time with an "indescribably beautiful" voice.

Schwarzkopf's entry in The Grove Book of Opera Singers concludes: "Although she dismissed her [Nazi Party] membership as a professional necessity, her reputation has remained tarnished by what seems to have been an active party membership." Charles Scribner III, writing in The New Criterion, has defended Schwarzkopf's party affiliation on the grounds that she was the daughter of an anti-Nazi dissident living in constant fear of the authorities.

== Awards ==
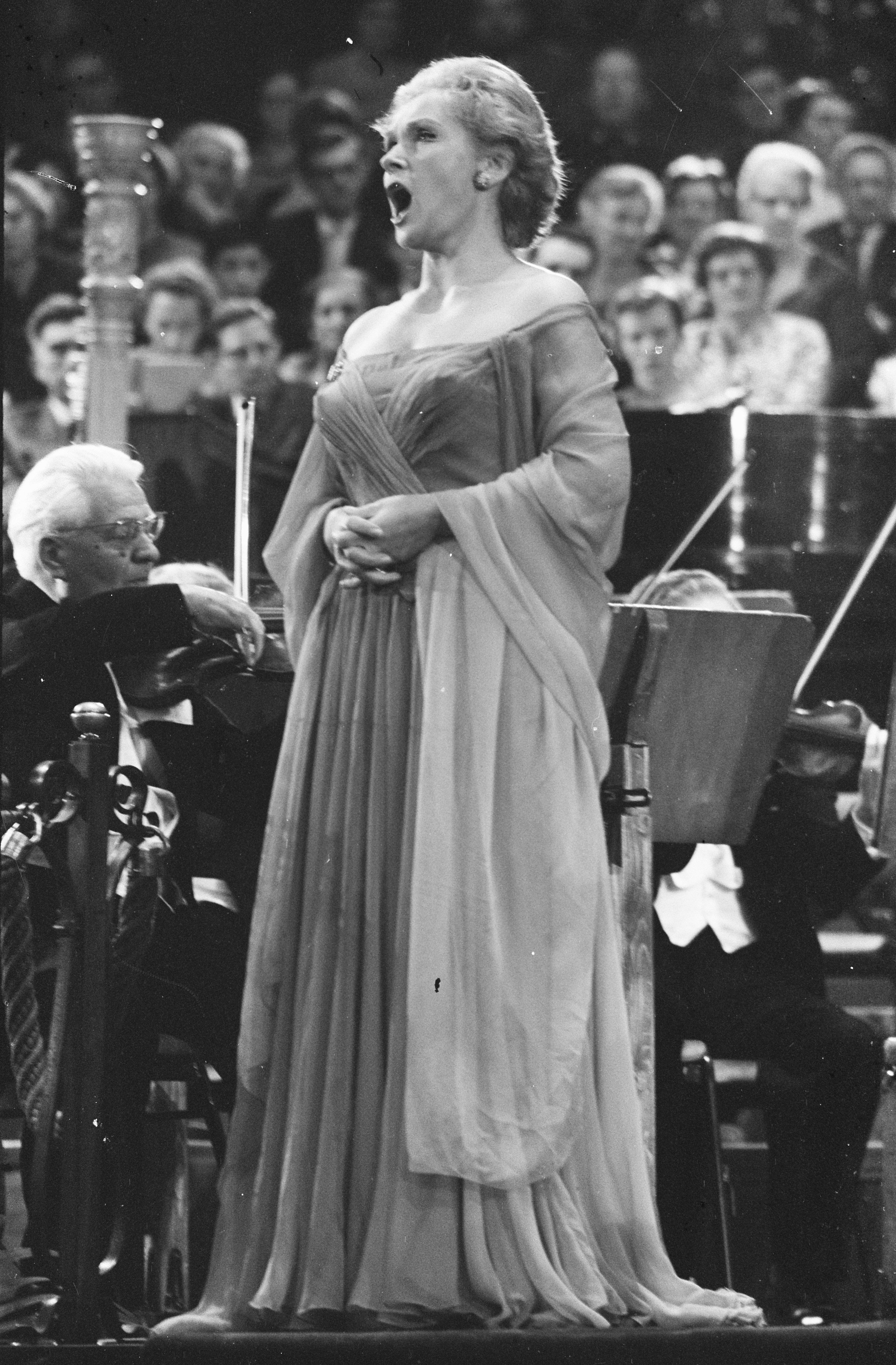
Elisabeth Schwarzkopf (Amsterdam, 1961)

- 1950: Lilli Lehmann Medal, Mozarteum International Foundation, Salzburg
- 1959: 1. "Orfeo d'Oro", Mantua (?)
- 1969: Orphée d'or recording award from the Académie du disque lyrique in Paris
- 1961: Edison Award, Amsterdam
- 1961: Awarded the title Deutsche Kammersängerin
- 1964: Honorary member of the Royal Swedish Academy of Music
- 1967: Stockholm television award for best European soprano Stockholmer
- 1971: Hugo-Wolf Medal
- 1974: Grand Cross of the Order of Merit of the Federal Republic of Germany
- 1982: Mozart Medal of the city of Frankfurt am Main
- 1983: Honorary member of the Vienna State Opera and title of Kammersängerin
- 1986: Commandeur de l'Ordre des Arts et des Lettres
- 1991: UNESCO Mozart Medal
- 1992: Dame Commander of the Order of the British Empire for services to music
- 2002: Honorary Medal of the City of Vienna
- 2012: Voted into Gramophone Hall of Fame

== Quotations ==
- (After being asked about Peter Sellars) "There are names I do not want mentioned in my home. Do not say that name in my presence. I have seen what he has done, and it is criminal. As my husband used to say, so far no one has dared go into the Louvre Museum to spray graffiti on the Mona Lisa, but some opera directors are spraying graffiti over masterpieces." – Newsweek interview, 15 October 1990
- "Many composers today don't know what the human throat is. At Bloomington, Indiana, I was invited to listen to music written in quarter tones for four harps and voices. I had to go out to be sick." – Newsweek interview, 15 October 1990
- (Asked in 1995 if she would sing in the cultural climate of the 1990s if she were much younger) "It's a kind of prostitution now. There is nobody I envy. There's a disintegration of integrity in our profession."

== Recordings ==
External audio
- Schwarzkopf as Hanna Glawari in a complete recording of Lehár's operetta The Merry Widow, Lovro von Matačić conducting the Philharmonia Orchestra with Eberhard Waechter and Nicolai Gedda in 1963

- Recital at Carnegie Hall (1956), EMI in "Great Performances of the Century", 1989

Bach

- St Matthew Passion (Klemperer), Philharmonia Orchestra (Warner Classics 1961)

Brahms

- A German Requiem (Klemperer), Philharmonia Orchestra (Warner Classics 1961)

Humperdinck

- Hänsel und Gretel (Karajan) (1953) Naxos 8.110897-98

Lehár

- Das Land des Lächelns (Ackermann) (1953) and excerpts from Lehár Operettas Naxos 8.111016-17
- Die lustige Witwe (Kunz, Gedda) (1953) Naxos 8.111007

Mozart

- Don Giovanni (Carlo Maria Giulini, Philharmonia Orchestra) (Warner Classics 1959) with Joan Sutherland as Donna Anna. For details, see Don Giovanni (Giulini recording).
- Le nozze di Figaro (Carlo Maria Giulini, Philharmonia Orchestra) (Warner Classics 1959). For details, see Le Nozze di Figaro (Giulini 1959 recording)
- Così fan tutte (Otto, Karajan) (1954) Naxos 8.111232-34. For details, see Così fan tutte (Herbert von Karajan recording)
- Die Zauberflöte (Otto Klemperer) (1960) (EMI 5673852). She plays the First Lady.
- Die Entführung aus dem Serail (Rudolf Moralt) (1949) (Gala GL100.501)

Puccini

- Turandot as Liù (Tullio Serafin, La Scala Orchestra; 1957 EMI Classics) with Callas as Turandot

Johann Strauss II

- Die Fledermaus (Gedda, Karajan) (1955) Naxos 8.111036-37
- Der Zigeunerbaron (Gedda, Prey, Kunz) (1954 Otto Ackermann, Philharmonia Orchestra & Chorus) EMI Classics 67535 ADD monaural 2CDs: 56:00, 44:11

Richard Strauss

- Der Rosenkavalier (Herbert von Karajan) (1956) (EMI 77357) The Marschallin was considered her signature-role.
- Four Last Songs / Arabella (highlights) (Ackermann, Matacic) (1953, 1954) Naxos 8.111145
- Four Last Songs (Szell; 1965; Warner Classics "Great Recordings of the Century"; Cat: 0724356696020)
- Ariadne auf Naxos (Streich, Karajan) (1954) Naxos 8.111033-34
- Capriccio (Christa Ludwig, Dietrich Fischer-Dieskau, Nicolai Gedda, Wolfgang Sawallisch) (1957) Warner Classics CDS 7 49014-8

External audio
- Schwarzkopf in a complete recording of Brahms' A German Requiem, Herbert von Karajan conducting the Vienna Philharmonic with Hans Hotter in 1947

Verdi

- Messa da Requiem (Di Stefano, De Sabata) (1954) Naxos 8.111049-50

Richard Wagner

- Die Meistersinger von Nürnberg (Karajan) (1951) Naxos 8.110872-75

== Video ==
She can be seen in two videotaped performances as the Marschallin:

- Schwarzkopf Seefried Fischer-Dieskau, a black-and-white DVD of these three singers. Schwarzkopf performs the Act I Finale from Der Rosenkavalier, from a performance filmed in London, 1961. Published by Warner Classics, Catalog number DVB 4904429.
- Der Rosenkavalier: the Film, a color videotape/DVD of a full length performance conducted by Herbert von Karajan with the Vienna Philharmonic Orchestra from the 1961 Salzburg Festival, featuring Sena Jurinac, Anneliese Rothenberger, Otto Edelmann and Erich Kunz; film directed by Paul Czinner. Published by KULTUR. ASIN: B0043988GM.
