= Afroditi (name) =

Afroditi and its variant Aphrodite are given names. People with the name include:

== People ==
- Afroditi Frida (born 1964), Greek singer
- Aphrodite Jones (born 1958), American author, reporter, and television producer
- Afroditi Kosma (born 1983), Greek basketball player
- Afroditi Krassa (born 1974), Greek-British designer
- Aphrodite Liti (born 1953), Greek sculptor and academic
- Afroditi Grigoriadou (1937–2020), Greek actress
- Afroditi Laoutari (1893–1975), Greek singer and musical theatre actress
- Afroditi Skafida (born 1982), Greek pole vaulter
- Afroditi Theopeftatou (born 1957), Greek civil engineer and politician

=== Compound name ===
- Olga-Afroditi Pilaki (born 1989), Greek rhythmic gymnast

== Fictional characters ==
- Aphrodite (Xena and Hercules), from the TV shows Xena: Warrior Princess and Hercules: The Legendary Journeys
- Aphrodite (comics), various characters
- Aphrodite A, a female mecha from the Mazinger Z anime and manga series
- Aphrodite Aperyi, a character on the ANT1 television series Erotas
- Pisces Aphrodite, in the Saint Seiya manga series
- Aphrodite, a playable character in Smite (video game)
- Aphrodite ('Afy') Hallijohn, fictional character in the novel East Lynne, by Ellen Wood, the 1913 film East Lynne, and other adaptations of the story

== See also ==
- Aphrodite (disambiguation)
