= Venus (comics) =

Venus, in comics, may refer to:

- Venus (Marvel Comics), two Marvel Comics characters
- Venus (comic book), a romance comic from 1948 from Marvel Comics which introduced the above character

== See also ==
- Venus (disambiguation)
- Aphrodite (comics), the Greek name for the same (or similar) deity
