= John Ardoin =

American music critic (1935–2001)

John Ardoin (January 8, 1935 – March 18, 2001) was an American music critic. The music critic of The Dallas Morning News for thirty-two years, he was particularly known for his friendship with the opera soprano Maria Callas, about whom Ardoin wrote four books. His influence stretched much further than Dallas, and he was well acquainted with many classical musicians of the postwar era.

== Life and career ==
John Ardoin was born in Alexandria, Louisiana, US on January 8, 1935. As a child of twelve, he became interested in listening to the Saturday Met broadcasts and also heard and saw many singers of the day on The Voice of Firestone, and The Bell Telephone Hour. As he notes, "the radio was my first important link to the whole world". He also describes his first experiences seeing opera:

it wasn't until I was about 16 or 17 I saw my first opera – the old Charles Wagner Company, which used to barnstorm around towns, with Beverly Sills. Wait, I should say, that was my second opera, because I heard my first opera, La bohème, and then I saw the next year this neighboring city was doing La traviata. I went, and there was a baby Bev and John Alexander.

However, in the same interview, he recounts a visit to the opera in New Orleans with his parents in 1950 or 1951 to see Risë Stevens as Carmen.

Ardoin attended North Texas State College (now the University of North Texas) in Denton and later transferred to the University of Texas at Austin. There he studied music theory and composition and obtained his Bachelor of Arts degree. Later, he received his Master of Arts from the University of Oklahoma at Norman and did postgraduate work at Michigan State University at East Lansing, Michigan.

During his army service spent in Stuttgart, (Germany), Ardoin had several important operatic experiences, not the least of which was a Ring cycle and a later Tristan und Isolde with the soprano Martha Mödl who "knocked me for a loop. From then on, I was searching for that same sort of incandescence in others... Mödl was electricity – from her toes to the top of her head. Never once a second out of character. I mean, the concentration was so fierce".

Upon returning to the US, he went to New York in the late 1950s and, for seven years, wrote about music. He was editor of Musical America magazine, managing editor of the program books for Philharmonic Hall (now Avery Fisher Hall) at Lincoln Center, a writer for the Saturday Review of Literature, as well as New York critic for The Times of London and Opera.

In June 1966 he became the music critic at The Dallas Morning News, only the second person to do so, but his most well-known writings were about Maria Callas, who was considered the godmother of the Dallas Opera after her 1958 appearances there. He became friendly with Callas during the 1960s and his 1977 book, The Callas Legacy, is an overview of her recordings, now in its 4th edition. Callas at Juilliard (1988) focuses on her master classes given in New York in the 1970s and it inspired playwright Terrence McNally to write the Tony Award-winning play Master Class. Ardoin also collaborated with Gerald Fitzgerald, and in 1974 they published Callas: the Art and the Life.

Frequently, Ardoin was a commentator on the Metropolitan Opera's weekly radio broadcasts and was a consultant to the PBS Great Performances series for twenty years. He wrote the script for Walter Cronkite's narration of the New Year's Day international telecasts of the Vienna Philharmonic Orchestra on New Year's Day.

He was given an honorary doctorate from the University of North Texas for his work in criticism in 1987, and, after retiring from the Morning News in 1998, Ardoin retired to Costa Rica.

He died in San José, Costa Rica on March 18, 2001.

== Selected writings ==
- The Callas Legacy: The Complete Guide to Her Recordings on Compact Disc, Pompton Plains, NJ: Amadeus Press, Fourth Edition, 1995 ISBN 0-931340-90-X A detailed analysis of every recording made by Maria Callas from 1949 to 1977.
- Callas at Juilliard: The Master Classes, Pompton Plains, NJ: Amadeus Press, 1984 ISBN 1-57467-042-5
- (with Gerald Fitzgerald), Callas: the Art and the Life, New York: Holt, Rinehart and Winston, 1974 ISBN 0-03-011486-1
- The Furtwängler Record, Pompton Plains, NJ: Amadeus Press, 1994 ISBN 0-931340-69-1 An overview of the conductor's career and his place in the mainstream of the German school of conducting.
- Valery Gergiev and the Kirov: A Story of Survival, Pompton Plains, NJ: Amadeus Press, 2001 ISBN 1-57467-064-6 An overview of the history of the Mariinsky Theatre and Valery Gergiev's efforts to revive it in the 1990s.
- The Stages of Menotti, New York: Doubleday, 1985 ISBN 0-385-14938-7
