= Aphrodite (disambiguation) =

Aphrodite is the Greek goddess for love and beauty

Aphrodite may also refer to:

== People ==
- Afroditi (name), list of people with the name and fictional characters
- Almighty Aphroditey, Swedish drag queen who competed on Drag Race Sverige

== Geography and astronomy ==
- Aphrodite Glacier, Graham Land, Antarctica
- 1388 Aphrodite, an asteroid
- Aphrodite gas field, off the southern coast of Cyprus
- Aphrodite 2, a submarine telecommunications cable system linking Greece and Cyprus

== Military ==
- Operation Aphrodite, a series of drone experiments by the U.S. Army Air Forces during World War II
- USS Aphrodite (SP-135), a U.S. Navy patrol vessel, from 1917 to 1919
- HMS Aphrodite, a cancelled Amphion-class submarine

== Books and films ==
- Aphrodite: mœurs antiques, an 1896 novel by Pierre Louÿs
- Aphrodite LaFonte, in the book series House of Night
- Aphrodite (film), a movie by Robert Fuest very loosely inspired by an episode from the Louÿs novel
- A version of Aphrodite debuted in DC Comics with All-Star Comics (Oct. 1941) #8.

== Music ==
- Afro-Dite, a band
- Aphrodite (musician), born Gavin King, a UK jungle and drum and bass DJ/producer
- Aphrodite's Theme by George Kotsonis Love Theme From "The Aphrodite Inheritance" BBC 1979
- Aphrodite, composition by George Whitefield Chadwick

=== Albums ===
- Aphrodite (Kylie Minogue album), 2010
- Aphrodite (Wink album), 1993
- Aphrodite, 1997 album by Aphrodite (musician)
- Aphrodite, 2004 album by Ikuko Kawai
- Afrodite, a 2004 album by Imani Coppola
- Afrodhit, a 2023 album by Iza

=== Songs ===
- "Aphrodite" (song), a 2010 song by Kylie Minogue
- "Aphrodite", a song by Nebula from the 2009 album Heavy Psych
- "Aphrodite", a song by Ash from Nu-Clear Sounds
- "Aphrodite", a song by Kamaliya

== Publications ==
- The London Aphrodite, British literary magazine (1928–1929)

== See also ==
- Aphrodita aculeata, the sea mouse, a marine worm named for the goddess Aphrodite
- Aphroditeola, a pink fragrant mushroom genus
