= Aphrodite (comics) =

Aphrodite, in comics, may refer to:

- Aphrodite (DC Comics), a DC Comics character connected to Wonder Woman
- Aphrodite (Marvel Comics), the goddess as depicted in Marvel Comics (also known as Venus)
- Aphrodite (Xena and Hercules), a character who has appeared in the Xena comic books
- Aphrodite IX, a 2000 series from the Image Comics imprint Top Cow
- Pisces Aphrodite, a character from the manga Saint Seiya
- Aphrodite, a character who appeared in the comic book Athena from Dynamite Entertainment

== See also ==
- Aphrodite (disambiguation)
- Venus (comics), the Roman name for the same (or similar) deity
