= Maria Callas =

American and Greek soprano (1923–1977)

Maria Callas Commendatore OMRI
- Μαρία Κάλλας
- Callas in 1958
- Born: Maria Anna Cecilia Sophia Kalogeropoulou; December 2, 1923; New York City, U.S.
- Died: September 16, 1977 (aged 53); Paris, France
- Resting place: Aegean Sea, Greece (Initially Père Lachaise Cemetery, Paris)
- Citizenship: Greece; United States (until 1966); Italy
- Education: Athens Conservatoire; George Washington Educational Campus
- Occupation: Opera singer
- Years active: 1941–1974
- Spouse: Giovanni Battista Meneghini (m. 1949; div. 1959)
- Partner: Aristotle Onassis (1959–1968)
- Awards: Grammy Lifetime Achievement Award

Maria Callas (Note: Pronunciation: /ˈkæləs/ KAL-əs, US also /ˈkɑːləs/ KAH-ləs; Greek: Μαρία Κάλλας, romanized: María Kállas, IPA: [maˈri.a ˈkalas].) (born Maria Anna Cecilia Sophia Kalogeropoulos; (Note: Greek: Μαρία Άννα Καικιλία Σοφία Καλογεροπούλου, romanized: María Ánna Kaikilía Sophía Kalogeropoúlou, IPA: [maˈri.a ˈana ceciˈli.a soˈfi.a kaloʝeroˈpulu].) December 2, 1923 – September 16, 1977) was an American and Greek soprano, and one of the most renowned and influential opera singers of the 20th century. Critics praised her bel canto technique, wide-ranging voice, and dramatic interpretations. Her repertoire ranged from classical opera seria to the bel canto operas of Donizetti, Bellini, and Rossini, and further to the works of Verdi and Puccini, and in her early career to the music dramas of Wagner. Her musical and dramatic talents led to her being hailed as La Divina ("The Divine One").

Born in Manhattan and raised in Astoria, Queens, New York City, to Greek immigrant parents, she had an overbearing mother who always wanted a son. Callas received her musical education in Greece at age 13 and later established her career in Italy. Forced to deal with the exigencies of 1940s wartime poverty and with near-sightedness that left her nearly blind on stage, she endured struggles and scandal over the course of her career. She underwent a mid-career weight loss, which might have contributed to her vocal decline and the premature end of her career.

The press exulted in publicizing Callas's temperamental behavior, the alleged Callas–Tebaldi rivalry, and her love affair with Greek shipping tycoon Aristotle Onassis. Onassis's wife, Athina "Tina" Onassis Niarchos, divorced him when she discovered that he was having an affair with Callas.

Although her dramatic life and personal tragedy have often overshadowed Callas the artist in the popular press, her artistic achievements were such that Leonard Bernstein called her "the Bible of opera", and her influence so enduring that, in 2006, Opera News wrote of her: "Nearly thirty years after her death, she's still the definition of the diva as artist—and still one of classical music's best-selling vocalists."

Her ashes were scattered over the Aegean Sea on 3 June 1979, fulfilling one of her last wishes.

== Life and career ==
=== Family life, childhood and move to Greece ===
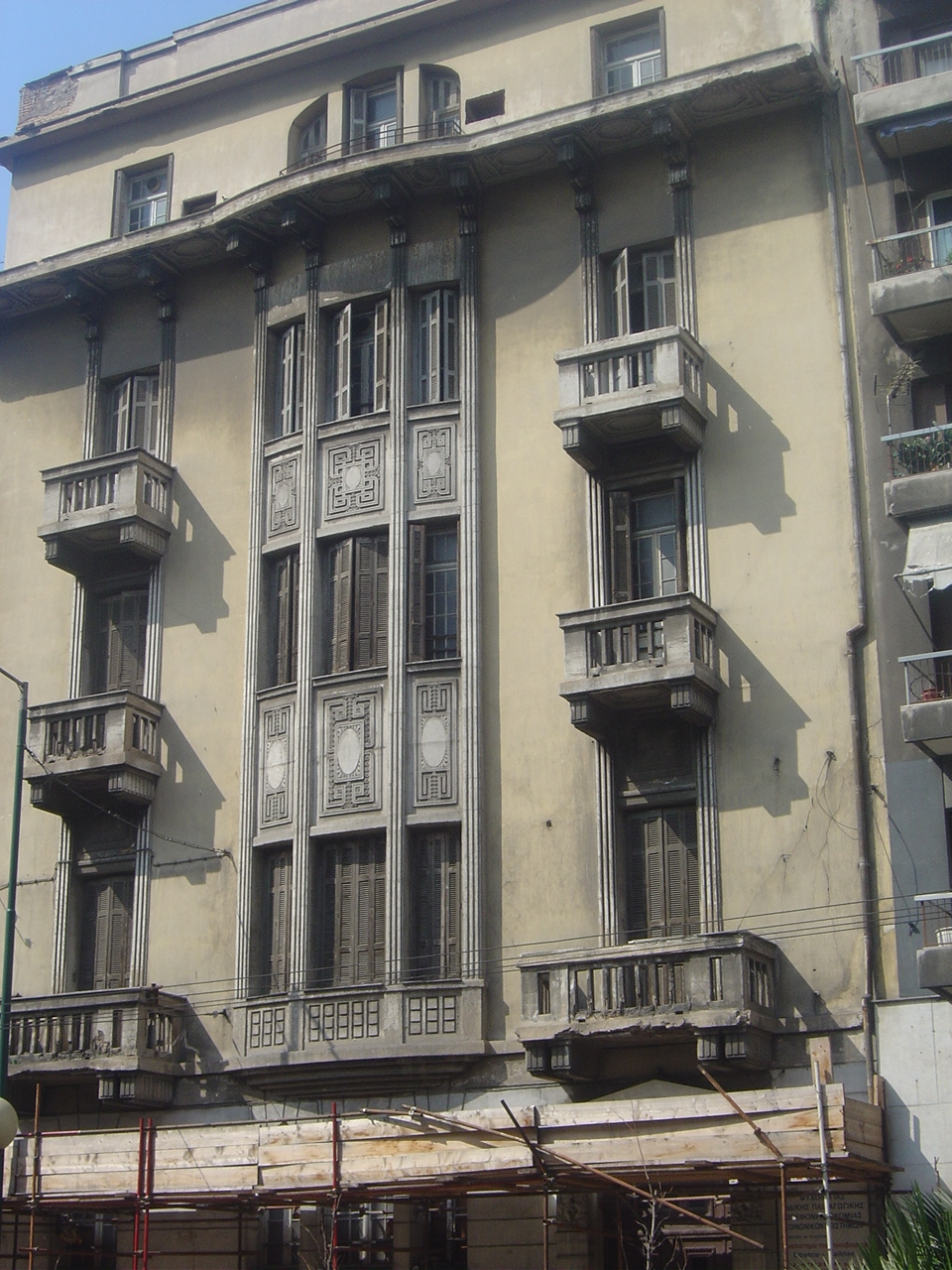
The apartment house in Athens where Callas lived from 1937 to 1945

The name on Callas's New York birth certificate is Sophie Cecilia Kalos, although she was christened Maria Anna Cecilia Sophia Kalogeropoulos (Greek: Μαρία Άννα Καικιλία Σοφία Καλογεροπούλου). She was born at Flower Fifth Avenue Hospital (now the Terence Cardinal Cooke Health Care Center) on December 2, 1923 in East Harlem, Manhattan, to Greek parents Elmina Evangelia "Litsa" (née Demes, originally Dimitriadou; c. 1894–1982) and George Kalogeropoulos (c. 1881–1972). Her mother was born in the town of Stylida in Phthiotis, and her father was born in the village of Neochori, near Meligalas in Messenia. He had shortened the surname Kalogeropoulos, first to Kalos and subsequently to Callas to make it more manageable.

George and Litsa Callas were an ill-matched couple from the beginning. George was easy-going and unambitious, with no interest in the arts, and Litsa was vivacious and socially ambitious and had dreamed of a life in the arts, which her middle-class parents had stifled in her childhood and youth. Litsa's father, Petros Dimitriadis (1852–1916), was in failing health when Litsa introduced George to her family. Petros, distrustful of George, warned his daughter, "You will never be happy with him. If you marry that man, I will never be able to help you." Litsa ignored his warning but soon realized that her father was right. The situation was aggravated by George's philandering and was improved neither by the birth of their daughter Yakinthi (later called "Jackie"), in 1917, nor the birth of their son Vassilis, in 1920. Vassilis's death from meningitis in the summer of 1922 dealt another blow to the marriage.

In 1923, after realizing that Litsa was pregnant again, George moved his family to the United States, a decision that Yakinthi recalled was greeted with Litsa "shouting hysterically" followed by George "slamming doors". The family left for New York in July 1923, moving first into an apartment in Astoria, Queens.

Litsa was convinced that her third child would be a boy, and her disappointment at the birth of another daughter was so great that she refused even to look at her new baby for four days. Maria was christened three years later, in 1926, at the Archdiocesan Cathedral of the Holy Trinity. When Maria was four, George Callas opened his own pharmacy, settling the family in Manhattan on 192nd Street in Washington Heights, where Callas grew up. Around the age of three, Maria's musical talent began to manifest itself, and after Litsa discovered that her younger daughter also had a voice, she began pressing "Mary" to sing. Callas later recalled, "I was made to sing when I was only five, and I hated it." George was unhappy with his wife favoring their elder daughter, as well as the pressure put upon young Mary to sing and perform, and Litsa was increasingly embittered with George and his absences and infidelity and often violently reviled him in front of their children. The marriage continued to deteriorate, and in 1937 Litsa returned to Athens with her two daughters.

=== Relationship with mother ===
Callas's relationship with her mother continued to erode during the years in Greece, and in the prime of her career it became a matter of great public interest, especially after a 1956 cover story in Time magazine, which focused on their relationship, and later by Litsa's book, My Daughter Maria Callas (1960). In public, Callas recalls the strained relationship with Litsa and her unhappy childhood spent singing and working at her mother's insistence, saying,

My sister was slim and beautiful and friendly, and my mother always preferred her. I was the ugly duckling, fat and clumsy and unpopular. It is a cruel thing to make a child feel ugly and unwanted ... I'll never forgive her for taking my childhood away. During all the years, I should have been playing and growing up, I was singing or making money. Everything I did for them was mostly good and everything they did to me was mostly bad.

In 1957, she told Chicago radio host Norman Ross Jr, "There must be a law against forcing children to perform at an early age. Children should have a wonderful childhood. They should not be given too much responsibility."

Biographer Nicholas Petsalis-Diomidis says that Litsa's hateful treatment of George in front of their young children led to resentment and dislike on Callas's part. According to both Callas's husband and her close friend Giulietta Simionato, Callas related to them that her mother, who did not work, pressed her to "go out with various men", mainly Italian and German soldiers, to bring home money and food during the Axis occupation of Greece during World War II. Simionato was convinced that Callas "managed to remain untouched" but never forgave her mother for what she perceived as a kind of prostitution forced on her. Litsa, beginning in New York and continuing in Athens, had adopted a questionable lifestyle that included not only pushing her daughters into degrading situations to support her financially but also entertaining Italian and German soldiers during the Axis occupation.

In an attempt to patch things up with her mother, Callas took Litsa along on her first visit to Mexico in 1950, but this only reawakened the old frictions and resentments, and after leaving Mexico, they never met again. After a series of angry and accusatory letters from Litsa lambasting Callas's father and husband, Callas ceased communication with her mother altogether.

A 1955 Time magazine story covered Callas's response to her mother's request for $100, "for my daily bread." Callas had replied, "Don't come to us with your troubles. I had to work for my money, and you are young enough to work, too. If you can't make enough money to live on, you can jump out of the window or drown yourself." Callas justified her behavior ... "They say my family is very short of money. Before God, I say why should they blame me? I feel no guilt and I feel no gratitude. I like to show kindness, but you mustn't expect thanks, because you won't get any. That's the way life is. If some day I need help, I wouldn't expect anything from anybody. When I'm old, nobody is going to worry about me."

=== Education ===
Callas received her musical education in Athens. Initially, her mother tried to enroll her at the prestigious Athens Conservatoire, without success. At the audition, her voice, still untrained, failed to impress, and the conservatoire's director Filoktitis Oikonomidis refused to accept her without her satisfying the theoretic prerequisites (solfege). In the summer of 1937, her mother visited Maria Trivella at the younger Greek National Conservatoire, asking her to take Mary, as she was then called, as a student for a modest fee. In 1957, Trivella recalled her impression of "Mary, a very plump young girl, wearing big glasses for her myopia":

The tone of the voice was warm, lyrical, intense; it swirled and flared like a flame and filled the air with melodious reverberations like a carillon. It was by any standards an amazing phenomenon, or rather it was a great talent that needed control, technical training and strict discipline in order to shine with all its brilliance.

Trivella agreed to tutor Callas, completely waiving her tuition fees, but no sooner had Callas started her formal lessons and vocal exercises than Trivella began to feel that Callas was not a contralto, as she had been told, but a dramatic soprano. Subsequently, they began working on raising the tessitura of her voice and to lighten its timbre. Trivella recalled Callas as

A model student. Fanatical, uncompromising, dedicated to her studies heart and soul. Her progress was phenomenal. She studied five or six hours a day. ... Within six months, she was singing the most difficult arias in the international opera repertoire with the utmost musicality.

On April 11, 1938, in her public debut, Callas ended the recital of Trivella's class at the Parnassos music hall with a duet from Tosca. Callas recalled that Trivella

had a French method, which was placing the voice in the nose, rather nasal ... and I had the problem of not having low chest tones, which is essential in bel canto ... And that's where I learned my chest tones.

However, when interviewed by Pierre Desgraupes on the French program L'invitée du dimanche, Callas attributed the development of her chest voice not to Trivella but to her next teacher, the Spanish coloratura soprano Elvira de Hidalgo.

Callas studied with Trivella for two years before her mother secured another audition at the Athens Conservatoire, with de Hidalgo. Callas auditioned with "Ocean, Thou Mighty Monster" from Weber's Oberon. De Hidalgo recalled hearing "tempestuous, extravagant cascades of sounds, as yet uncontrolled but full of drama and emotion". She agreed to take her as a pupil immediately, but Callas's mother asked de Hidalgo to wait for a year, as Callas would be graduating from the National Conservatoire and could begin working. On April 2, 1939, Callas undertook the part of Santuzza in a student production of Mascagni's Cavalleria rusticana by the Greek National Opera at the Olympia Theatre, and that autumn she enrolled at the Athens Conservatoire in Elvira de Hidalgo's class.

In 1968 Callas told Lord Harewood,

De Hidalgo had the real great training, maybe even the last real training of the real bel canto. As a young girl—thirteen years old—I was immediately thrown into her arms, meaning that I learned the secrets, the ways of this bel canto, which of course as you well know, is not just beautiful singing. It is a very hard training; it is a sort of a strait-jacket that you're supposed to put on, whether you like it or not. You have to learn to read, to write, to form your sentences, how far you can go, fall, hurt yourself, put yourself back on your feet continuously. De Hidalgo had one method, which was the real bel canto way, where no matter how heavy a voice, it should always be kept light, it should always be worked on in a flexible way, never to weigh it down. It is a method of keeping the voice light and flexible and pushing the instrument into a certain zone where it might not be too large in sound, but penetrating. And teaching the scales, trills, all the bel canto embellishments, which is a whole vast language of its own.

De Hidalgo later recalled Callas as "a phenomenon ... She would listen to all my students, sopranos, mezzos, tenors ... She could do it all." Callas said that she would go to "the conservatoire at 10 in the morning and leave with the last pupil ... devouring music" for 10 hours a day. When asked by her teacher why she did this, her answer was that even "with the least talented pupil, he can teach you something that you, the most talented, might not be able to do."

=== Early operatic career in Greece ===
After several appearances as a student, Callas began appearing in secondary roles at the Greek National Opera. De Hidalgo was instrumental in securing roles for her, allowing Callas to earn a small salary, which helped her and her family get through the difficult war years.

Callas made her professional debut in February 1941, in the small role of Beatrice in Franz von Suppé's Boccaccio. Soprano Galatea Amaxopoulou, who sang in the chorus, later recalled, "Even in rehearsal, Maria's fantastic performing ability had been obvious, and from then on, the others started trying ways of preventing her from appearing." Fellow singer Maria Alkeou similarly recalled that the established sopranos Nafsika Galanou and Anna (Zozó) Remmoundou "used to stand in the wings while [Callas] was singing and make remarks about her, muttering, laughing, and point their fingers at her".

Despite these hostilities, Callas managed to continue and made her debut in a leading role in August 1942 as Tosca, going on to sing the role of Marta in Eugen d'Albert's Tiefland at the Olympia Theatre. Callas's performance as Marta received glowing reviews. Critic Spanoudi declared Callas "an extremely dynamic artist possessing the rarest dramatic and musical gifts", and Evangelos Magkliveras evaluated Callas's performance for the weekly To Radiophonon:

The singer who took the part of Marta, that new star in the Greek firmament, with a matchless depth of feeling, gave a theatrical interpretation well up to the standard of a tragic actress. About her exceptional voice with its astonishing natural fluency, I do not wish to add anything to the words of Alexandra Lalaouni: 'Kalogeropoulou is one of those God-given talents that one can only marvel at.'

Following these performances, even Callas's detractors began to refer to her as "The God-Given". Some time later, watching Callas rehearse Beethoven's Fidelio, rival soprano Anna Remoundou asked a colleague "Could it be that there is something divine and we haven't realized it?" Following Tiefland, Callas sang the role of Santuzza in Cavalleria rusticana again and followed it with O Protomastoras (Manolis Kalomiris) at the ancient Odeon of Herodes Atticus at the foot of the Acropolis.

During August and September 1944 Callas performed the role of Leonore in a Greek-language production of Fidelio, again at the Odeon of Herodes Atticus. German critic Friedrich Herzog, who attended the performances, declared Leonore Callas's "greatest triumph":

When Maria Kaloyeropoulou's Leonore let her soprano soar out radiantly in the untrammelled jubilation of the duet, she rose to the most sublime heights ... Here she gave bud, blossom and fruit to that harmony of sound that also ennobled the art of the prima donna.

After the liberation of Greece, de Hidalgo advised Callas to establish herself in Italy. Callas proceeded to give a series of concerts around Greece, and then, against her teacher's advice, she returned to America to see her father and to further pursue her career. When she left Greece on September 14, 1945, two months short of her 22nd birthday, Callas had given 56 performances in seven operas and had appeared in around 20 recitals. Callas considered her Greek career as the foundation of her musical and dramatic upbringing, saying "When I got to the big career, there were no surprises for me."

=== Main operatic career ===
After returning to the United States and reuniting with her father in September 1945, Callas made the round of auditions. In December of that year, she auditioned for Edward Johnson, general manager of the Metropolitan Opera, and was favorably received: "Exceptional voice—ought to be heard very soon on stage".

Callas said that the Metropolitan Opera offered her Madama Butterfly and Fidelio, to be performed in Philadelphia and sung in English, both of which she declined, saying that she felt too fat for Butterfly and did not like the idea of opera in English. Although this offer is not documented in the Met's records, in a 1958 interview with the New York Post, Johnson confirmed that a contract was offered: "... but she didn't like it—because of the contract, not because of the roles. She was right in turning it down—it was frankly a beginner's contract."

=== Italy, Meneghini, and Serafin ===
In 1946, Callas was engaged to re-open the opera house in Chicago as Turandot, but the company folded before opening. Basso Nicola Rossi-Lemeni, who also was to star in this opera, was aware that Tullio Serafin was looking for a dramatic soprano to cast as La Gioconda at the Arena di Verona. He later recalled the young Callas as being "amazing—so strong physically and spiritually; so certain of her future. I knew in a big outdoor theatre like Verona's, this girl, with her courage and huge voice, would make a tremendous impact." Subsequently he recommended Callas to retired tenor and impresario Giovanni Zenatello. During her audition, Zenatello became so excited that he jumped up and joined Callas in the act 4 duet.

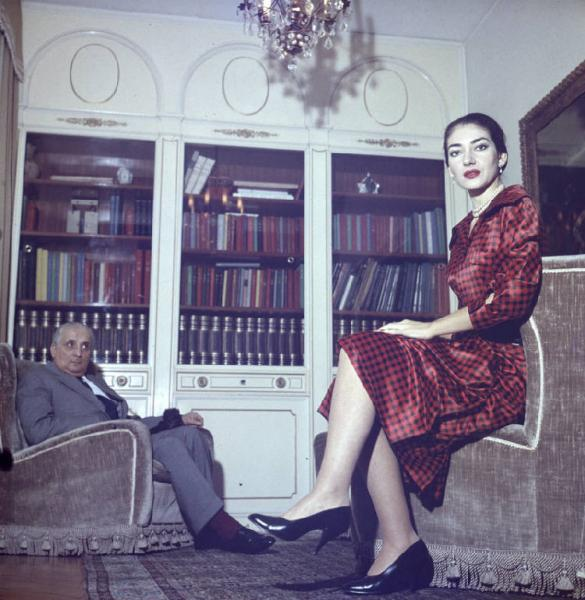
Callas with her husband Giovanni Battista Meneghini in 1957

It was in this role that Callas made her Italian debut. Upon her arrival in Verona, Callas met Giovanni Battista Meneghini, an older, wealthy industrialist, who began courting her. They married in 1949, which gave her automatic Italian citizenship, and he assumed control of her career until 1959, when the marriage dissolved. It was Meneghini's love and support that gave Callas the time needed to establish herself in Italy, and throughout the prime of her career, she went by the name of Maria Meneghini Callas.

After La Gioconda, Callas had no offers, and when Serafin, looking for someone to sing Isolde, called on her, she told him that she already knew the score, even though she had looked at only the first act out of curiosity while at the conservatory. She sang the opera's second act for Serafin, who praised her for knowing the role so well, whereupon she admitted to having just then sight-read the music. Even more impressed, Serafin immediately cast her in the role. Serafin thereafter served as Callas's mentor and supporter.

Lord Harewood stated "Very few Italian conductors have had a more distinguished career than Tullio Serafin, and perhaps none, apart from Toscanini, more influence". In 1968, Callas recalled that working with Serafin was the "really lucky" opportunity of her career because "he taught me that there must be an expression; that there must be a justification. He taught me the depth of music, the justification of music. That's where I really really drank all I could from this man".

=== I puritani and path to bel canto ===
The great turning point, in Callas's career, occurred in Venice in 1949. She was engaged to sing the role of Brünnhilde, in Die Walküre, at the Teatro la Fenice, when Margherita Carosio, who was engaged to sing Elvira in I puritani, in the same theatre, fell ill. Unable to find a replacement for Carosio, Serafin told Callas that she would be singing Elvira in six days. When Callas protested that she not only did not know the role, but also had three more Brünnhildes to sing, he told her "I guarantee that you can". Michael Scott's words, "the notion of any one singer embracing music as divergent in its vocal demands as Wagner's Brünnhilde and Bellini's Elvira in the same career would have been cause enough for surprise; but to attempt to essay them both in the same season seemed like folie de grandeur".

Before the performance actually took place, one incredulous critic snorted, "We hear that Serafin has agreed to conduct I puritani with a dramatic soprano ... When can we expect a new edition of La traviata with [male baritone] Gino Bechi's Violetta?" After the performance, one critic wrote, "Even the most sceptical had to acknowledge the miracle that Maria Callas accomplished ... the flexibility of her limpid, beautifully poised voice, and her splendid high notes. Her interpretation also has a humanity, warmth and expressiveness that one would search for in vain in the fragile, pellucid coldness of other Elviras." Franco Zeffirelli recalled, "What she did in Venice was really incredible. You need to be familiar with opera to realize the size of her achievement. It was as if someone asked Birgit Nilsson, who is famous for her great Wagnerian voice, to substitute overnight for Beverly Sills, who is one of the great coloratura sopranos of our time."

Scott asserts that "Of all the many roles Callas undertook, it is doubtful if any had a more far-reaching effect." This initial foray into the bel canto repertoire changed the course of Callas's career and set her on a path leading to Lucia di Lammermoor, La traviata, Armida, La sonnambula, Il pirata, Il turco in Italia, Medea, and Anna Bolena, and reawakened interest in the long-neglected operas of Cherubini, Bellini, Donizetti and Rossini.

In the words of soprano Montserrat Caballé:

She opened a new door for us, for all the singers in the world, a door that had been closed. Behind it was sleeping not only great music but great idea of interpretation. She has given us the chance, those who follow her, to do things that were hardly possible before her. That I am compared with Callas is something I never dared to dream. It is not right. I am much smaller than Callas.

As with I puritani, Callas learned and performed Cherubini's Medea, Giordano's Andrea Chénier and Rossini's Armida on a few days' notice. Throughout her career, Callas displayed her vocal versatility in recitals that juxtaposed dramatic soprano arias alongside coloratura pieces, including in a 1952 RAI recital in which she opened with "Lady Macbeth's" letter scene, followed by the "Mad Scene" from Lucia di Lammermoor, then Abigaille's treacherous recitative and aria from Nabucco, finishing with the "Bell Song" from Lakmé capped by a ringing high E in alt (E6).

=== Important debuts ===
By 1951 Callas had sung at all the major theatres in Italy but she had not yet made her official debut at Italy's most prestigious opera house, Teatro alla Scala in Milan. According to composer Gian Carlo Menotti, Callas had substituted for Renata Tebaldi in the role of Aida in 1950, and La Scala's general manager, Antonio Ghiringhelli, had taken an immediate dislike to Callas.

Menotti recalls that Ghiringhelli had promised him any singer he wanted for the premiere of The Consul, but when he suggested Callas, Ghiringhelli said that he would never have Callas at La Scala except as a guest artist. However, as Callas's fame grew, and especially after her great success in I vespri siciliani in Florence, Ghiringhelli had to relent; Callas made her official debut at La Scala in Verdi's I vespri siciliani on opening night in December 1951, after which La Scala became her artistic home throughout the 1950s. La Scala mounted many new productions especially for Callas by directors including Herbert von Karajan, Margherita Wallmann, Franco Zeffirelli and, most importantly, Luchino Visconti. Visconti stated later that he began directing opera only because of Callas, and he directed her in lavish new productions of La vestale, La traviata, La sonnambula, Anna Bolena, and Iphigénie en Tauride. Callas was instrumental in arranging Franco Corelli's debut at La Scala in 1954, where he sang Licinio in Spontini's La vestale opposite Callas's Julia. The two had sung together for the first time the previous year in Rome in a production of Norma. Anthony Tommasini wrote that Corelli had "earned great respect from the fearsomely demanding Callas, who, in Mr Corelli, finally had someone with whom she could act." The two collaborated several more times at La Scala, singing opposite each other in productions of Fedora (1956), Il pirata (1958), and Poliuto (1960). Their partnership continued throughout the rest of Callas's career.

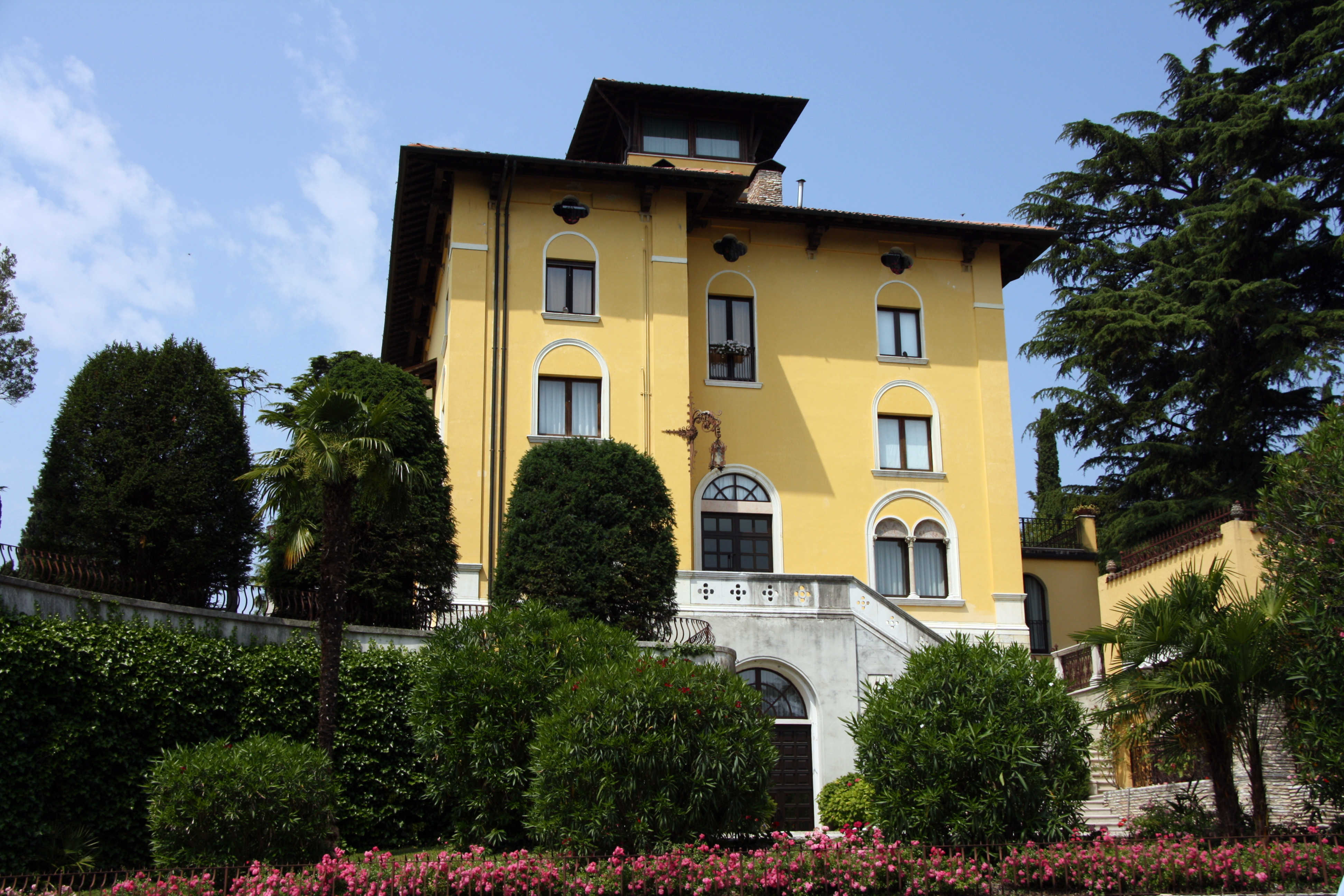
The Villa in Sirmione where Callas lived with Giovanni Battista Meneghini between 1950 and 1959

The night of the day she married Meneghini in Verona, she sailed for Argentina to sing at the Teatro Colón in Buenos Aires. Callas made her South American debut in Buenos Aires on May 20, 1949, during the European summer opera recess. Her performances as Aida, Turandot, and Norma were directed by Serafin and supported by Mario Del Monaco, Fedora Barbieri, and Nicola Rossi-Lemeni. These were her only appearances on this world-renowned stage. Her debut in the United States was five years later in Chicago in 1954, and "with the Callas Norma, Lyric Opera of Chicago was born."

Her Metropolitan Opera debut, opening the Met's seventy-second season on October 29, 1956, was again with Norma, but was preceded by an unflattering cover story in Time magazine, which rehashed all of the Callas clichés, including her temper, her supposed rivalry with Renata Tebaldi, and especially her difficult relationship with her mother. As she had done with Lyric Opera of Chicago, on November 21, 1957, Callas gave a concert to inaugurate what then was billed as the Dallas Civic Opera, and helped establish that company with her friends from Chicago, Lawrence Kelly and Nicola Rescigno. She further consolidated this company's standing when, in 1958, she gave "a towering performance as Violetta in La traviata, and that same year, in her only American performances of Medea, gave an interpretation of the title role worthy of Euripides."

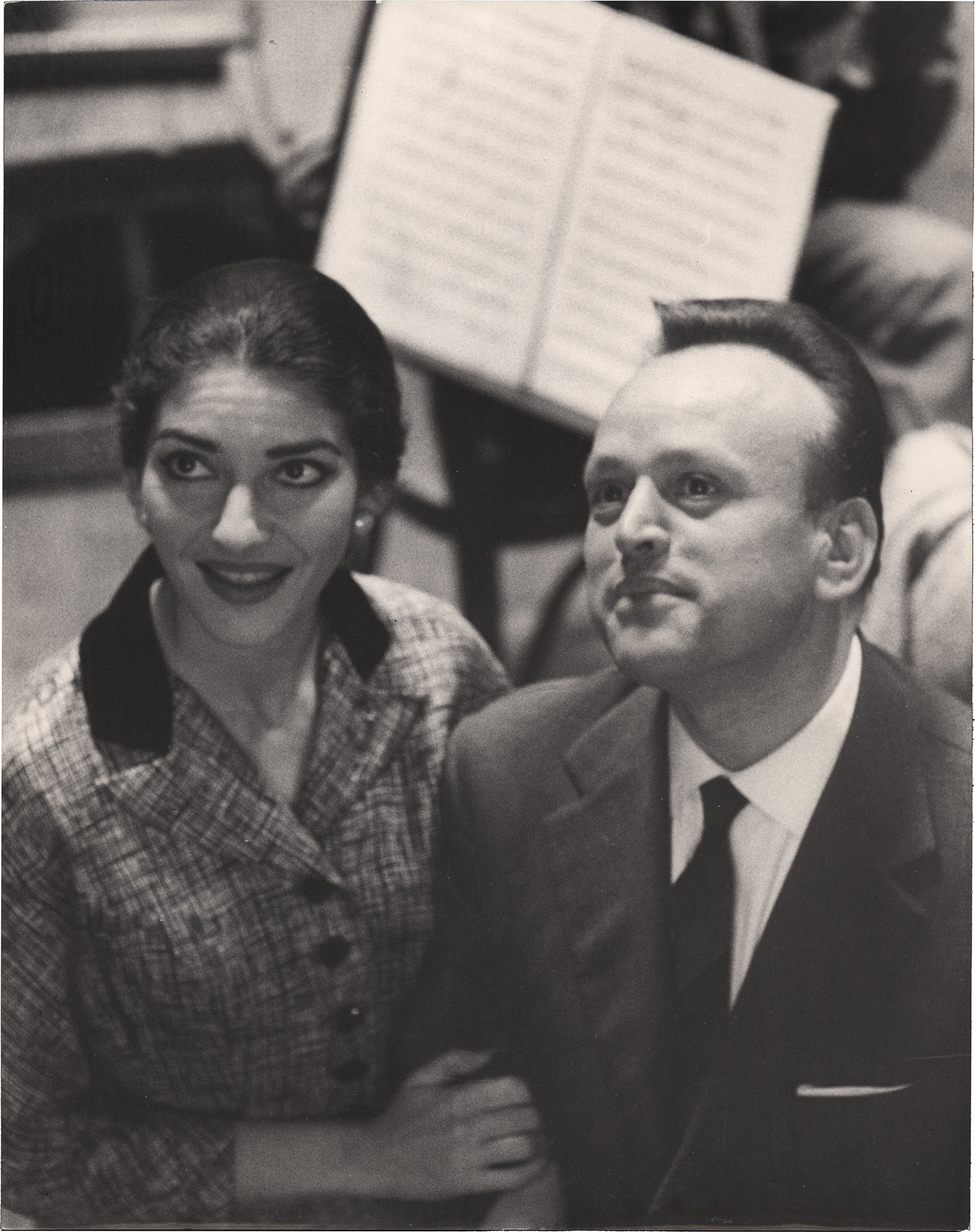
Callas and Italian tenor Mirto Picchi; performers in Cherubini's Medea, Milan, 1957

In 1958, a feud with general manager Rudolf Bing led to Callas's Metropolitan Opera contract being cancelled. Impresario Allen Oxenburg realised that this situation provided him with an opportunity for his own company, the American Opera Society, and he accordingly approached her with a contract to perform Imogene in Il pirata. She accepted and sang the role in a January 1959 performance that according to opera critic Allan Kozinn "quickly became legendary in operatic circles". Bing and Callas later reconciled their differences, and she returned to the Met in 1965 to sing the title role in two performances of Tosca opposite Franco Corelli as Cavaradossi for one performance (March 19, 1965) and Richard Tucker (March 25, 1965) with Tito Gobbi as Scarpia for her final performances at the Met.

In 1952, she made her London debut at the Royal Opera House in Norma with veteran mezzo-soprano Ebe Stignani as Adalgisa, a performance which survives on record and also features the young Joan Sutherland in the small role of Clotilde. Callas and the London public had what she called "a love affair", and she returned to the Royal Opera House in 1953, 1957, 1958, 1959, and 1964 to 1965. It was at the Royal Opera House where, on July 5, 1965, Callas ended her stage career in the role of Tosca, in a production designed and mounted for her by Franco Zeffirelli and featuring her friend and colleague Tito Gobbi.

=== Weight loss ===
External image
- Photographic comparison of weight loss during 1953–54. The estate of Maria Callas writes that she lost 30 kilograms (66 lb) from 1953 to 1954. Other weight loss estimates include 36 kg.

In the early years of her career, Callas was a heavy woman; in her own words, "Heavy—one can say—yes I was; but I'm also a tall woman, 5' 8 1/2" (1.74 m), and I used to weigh no more than 200 pounds (90 kilograms)." Tito Gobbi relates that during a lunch break while recording Lucia in Florence, Serafin commented to Callas that she was eating too much and allowing her weight to become a problem. When she protested that she was not so heavy, Gobbi suggested she should "put the matter to test" by stepping on the weighing machine outside the restaurant. The result was "somewhat dismaying, and she became rather silent." In 1968, Callas told Edward Downes that during her initial performances in Cherubini's Medea in May 1953, she realized that she needed a leaner face and figure to do dramatic justice to this as well as the other roles she was undertaking. She added,

I was getting so heavy that even my vocalizing was getting heavy. I was tiring myself, I was perspiring too much, and I was really working too hard. And I wasn't really well, as in health; I couldn't move freely. And then I was tired of playing a game, for instance playing this beautiful young woman, and I was heavy and uncomfortable to move around. In any case, it was uncomfortable and I didn't like it. So I felt now if I'm going to do things right—I've studied all my life to put things right musically, so why don't I diet and put myself into a certain condition where I'm presentable.

During 1953 and early 1954, she lost almost 80 pounds (36 kg), turning herself into what Rescigno called "possibly the most beautiful lady on the stage." Various rumors spread regarding her weight loss method; one had her swallowing a tapeworm, and Rome's Panatella Mills pasta company claimed she lost weight by eating their "physiologic pasta," prompting Callas to file a lawsuit. Callas stated that she lost the weight by eating a sensible low-calorie diet of mainly salads and chicken. Callas never regained the weight she lost and kept her slim figure until her death.

Some believe that the loss of body mass made it more difficult for her to support her voice, triggering the vocal strain that became apparent later in the decade, and others believed the weight loss effected a newfound softness and femininity in her voice, as well as a greater confidence as a person and performer. Tito Gobbi said,

Now she was not only supremely gifted both musically and dramatically—she was a beauty too. And her awareness of this invested with fresh magic every role she undertook. What it eventually did to her vocal and nervous stamina I am not prepared to say. I only assert that she blossomed into an artist unique in her generation and outstanding in the whole range of vocal history.

=== Alleged Callas–Tebaldi rivalry ===
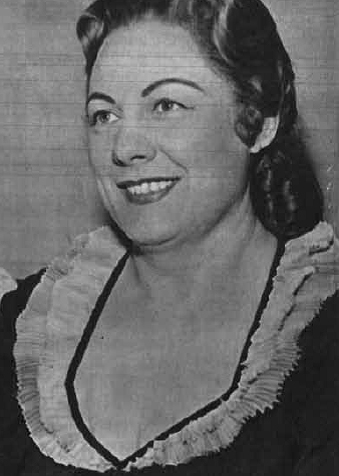
Callas's rival, Renata Tebaldi, 1961

During the early 1950s, an alleged rivalry arose between Callas and Renata Tebaldi, an Italian lyrico spinto soprano. The contrast between Callas's often unconventional vocal qualities and Tebaldi's classically beautiful sound resurrected a debate, namely, beauty of sound versus the expressive use of sound.

In 1951, Tebaldi and Maria Callas were jointly booked for a vocal recital in Rio de Janeiro, Brazil. Although the singers agreed that neither would perform encores, Tebaldi took two, and Callas was reportedly incensed. This incident began the rivalry, which reached a fever pitch in the mid-1950s, at times even engulfing the two women themselves, who were said by their more fanatical followers to have engaged in verbal barbs in each other's direction.

Tebaldi was quoted as saying, "I have one thing that Callas doesn't have: a heart", and Callas was quoted in Time magazine as saying that comparing her with Tebaldi was like "comparing Champagne with Cognac ... No ... with Coca Cola". However, witnesses to the interview stated that Callas had said only "champagne with cognac", and that it was a bystander who had quipped: "... No ... with Coca-Cola." Nevertheless, the Time reporter attributed the latter comment to Callas.

According to John Ardoin, these two singers never should have been compared. Tebaldi was trained by Carmen Melis, a noted verismo specialist, and she was rooted in the early 20th century Italian school of singing just as firmly as Callas was rooted in 19th century bel canto. Callas was a dramatic soprano, whereas Tebaldi was considered essentially a lyric soprano. Callas and Tebaldi generally sang a different repertoire: In the early years of her career, Callas concentrated on the heavy dramatic soprano roles and later in her career on the bel canto repertoire, whereas Tebaldi concentrated on late Verdi and verismo roles, where her limited upper extension and her lack of a florid technique were not issues. They shared a few roles, including Tosca in Puccini's opera and La Gioconda, which Tebaldi performed only late in her career.

The alleged rivalry aside, Callas made remarks appreciative of Tebaldi, and vice versa. During an interview with Norman Ross Jr. in Chicago, Callas said, "I admire Tebaldi's tone; it's beautiful—also some beautiful phrasing. Sometimes, I actually wish I had her voice." Francis Robinson of the Met wrote of an incident in which Tebaldi asked him to recommend a recording of La Gioconda in order to help her learn the role. Being fully aware of the alleged rivalry, he recommended Zinka Milanov's version. A few days later, he went to visit Tebaldi, only to find her sitting by the speakers, listening intently to Callas's recording. She then looked up at him and asked, "Why didn't you tell me Maria's was the best?"

Callas visited Tebaldi after a performance of Adriana Lecouvreur at the Met in 1968, and the two were reunited. In 1978, Tebaldi spoke warmly of her late colleague and summarized this rivalry:

This rivality [sic] was really building from the people of the newspapers and the fans. But I think it was very good for both of us, because the publicity was so big and it created a very big interest about me and Maria and was very good in the end. But I don't know why they put this kind of rivality [sic], because the voice was very different. She was really something unusual. And I remember that I was very young artist too, and I stayed near the radio every time that I know that there was something on radio by Maria.

=== Vocal decline ===
In the opinion of several singers, the heavy roles undertaken in her early years damaged Callas's voice. The mezzo-soprano Giulietta Simionato, Callas's close friend and frequent colleague, stated that she told Callas that she felt that the early heavy roles led to a weakness in the diaphragm and subsequent difficulty in controlling the upper register.

Louise Caselotti, who worked with Callas in 1946 and 1947, prior to her Italian debut, felt that it was not the heavy roles that hurt Callas's voice, but the lighter ones. Several singers have suggested that Callas's heavy use of the chest voice led to stridency and unsteadiness with the high notes. In his book, Callas's husband Meneghini wrote that Callas suffered an unusually early onset of menopause, which could have affected her voice. Soprano Carol Neblett once said, "A woman sings with her ovaries—you're only as good as your hormones."

Critic Henry Pleasants has stated that it was a loss of physical strength and breath-support that led to Callas's vocal problems, saying,

Singing, and especially opera singing, requires physical strength. Without it, the singer's respiratory functions can no longer support the steady emissions of breath essential to sustaining the production of focused tone. The breath escapes, but it is no longer the power behind the tone, or is only partially and intermittently. The result is a breathy sound—tolerable but hardly beautiful—when the singer sings lightly, and a voice spread and squally when under pressure.

In the same vein, Joan Sutherland, who heard Callas throughout the 1950s, said in a BBC interview,

[Hearing Callas in Norma in 1952] was a shock, a wonderful shock. You just got shivers up and down the spine. It was a bigger sound in those earlier performances, before she lost weight. I think she tried very hard to recreate the sort of "fatness" of the sound which she had when she was as fat as she was. But when she lost the weight, she couldn't seem to sustain the great sound that she had made, and the body seemed to be too frail to support that sound that she was making. Oh, but it was oh so exciting. It was thrilling. I don't think that anyone who heard Callas after 1955 really heard the Callas voice.

Michael Scott has proposed that Callas's loss of strength and breath support was directly caused by her rapid and progressive weight loss, something that was noted even in her prime. Of her 1958 recital in Chicago, Robert Detmer wrote, "There were sounds fearfully uncontrolled, forced beyond the too-slim singer's present capacity to support or sustain."

Photos and videos of Callas during her heavy era show a very upright posture with the shoulders relaxed and held back. Of a television broadcast from May 1960 of a recital in Hamburg, The Opera Quarterly noted, "[W]e [can] watch ... the constantly sinking, depressed chest and hear the resulting deterioration". This continual change in posture has been cited as visual proof of a progressive loss of breath support.

Commercial and bootleg recordings of Callas from the late 1940s to 1953—the period during which she sang the heaviest dramatic soprano roles—show no decline in the fabric of the voice, no loss in volume and no unsteadiness or shrinkage in the upper register. Of her December 1952 Lady Macbeth—coming after five years of singing the most strenuous dramatic soprano repertoire—Peter Dragadze wrote for Opera, "Callas' voice since last season has improved a great deal, the second passagio on the high B-natural and C has now completely cleared, giving her an equally colored scale from top to bottom." And of her performance of Medea a year later, John Ardoin writes, "The performance displays Callas in as secure and free a voice as she will be found at any point in her career. The many top B's have a brilliant ring, and she handles the treacherous tessitura like an eager thoroughbred."

In recordings from 1954 (immediately after her 80-pound or 36-kilogram weight loss) and thereafter, "not only would the instrument lose its warmth and become thin and acidulous, but the altitudinous passages would to her no longer come easily." It was at this time that unsteady top notes first begin to appear. Walter Legge, who produced nearly all of Callas's EMI/Angel recordings, states that Callas "ran into a patch of vocal difficulties as early as 1954": during the recording of La forza del destino, done immediately after the weight loss, the "wobble had become so pronounced" that he told Callas they "would have to give away seasickness pills with every side".

There were others, however, who felt that the voice had benefitted from the weight loss. Of her performance of Norma in Chicago in 1954, Claudia Cassidy wrote that "there is a slight unsteadiness in some of the sustained upper notes, but to me her voice is more beautiful in color, more even through the range, than it used to be". And at her performance of the same opera in London in 1957 (her first performance at Covent Garden after the weight loss), critics again felt her voice had changed for the better, that it had now supposedly become a more precise instrument, with a new focus. Many of her most critically acclaimed appearances are from 1954–1958 (Norma, La traviata, Sonnambula and Lucia of 1955, Anna Bolena of 1957, Medea of 1958, among others). Callas's close friend and colleague Tito Gobbi thought that her vocal problems all stemmed from her state of mind:

I don't think anything happened to her voice. I think she only lost confidence. She was at the top of a career that a human being could desire, and she felt enormous responsibility. She was obliged to give her best every night, and maybe she felt she wasn't [able] any more, and she lost confidence. I think this was the beginning of the end of this career.

In support of Gobbi's assertion, a bootleg recording of Callas rehearsing Beethoven's aria "Ah! perfido" and parts of Verdi's La forza del destino shortly before her death shows her voice to be in much better shape than much of her 1960s recordings and far healthier than the 1970s concerts with Giuseppe Di Stefano.

Soprano Renée Fleming posited that videos of Callas in the late 1950s and early 1960s reveal a posture that betrays breath-support problems:

I have a theory about what caused her vocal decline, but it's more from watching her sing than from listening. I really think it was her weight loss that was so dramatic and so quick. It's not the weight loss per se—you know, Deborah Voigt has lost a lot of weight and still sounds glorious. But if one uses the weight for support, and then it's suddenly gone and one doesn't develop another musculature for support, it can be very hard on the voice. And you can't estimate the toll that emotional turmoil will take as well. I was told, by somebody who knew her well, that the way Callas held her arms to her solar plexus [allowed her] to push and create some kind of support. If she were a Soubrette, it would never have been an issue. But she was singing the most difficult repertoire, the stuff that requires the most stamina, the most strength.

However, writing about dramatic soprano Deborah Voigt in 2006 shortly after her 135-pound (60 kg) weight loss after gastric bypass surgery, music critic Peter G. Davis brings up comparisons with Callas and notes an increasing acidity and thinning in Voigt's voice that recall the changes in Callas's voice after her weight loss:

A change has also come over Voigt's voice lately, though it's hard to tell if it's from weight loss or normal aging—controversy still rages over whether Maria Callas' drastic diets contributed to her rapid vocal decline. Not that Voigt as yet exhibits any of Callas' technical problems: Her voice continues to be reliably supported and under control. What is noticeable, however—earlier this season in Verdi's La Forza del Destino and now in Tosca—is a marked thinning of quality at the very center of the instrument, together with a slight acidity and tightening of the tone that has definitely taken the youthful bloom off, especially at the top.

Voigt explained how her dramatic weight loss affected her breathing and breath support:

Much of what I did with my weight was very natural, vocally. Now I've got a different body—there's not as much of me around. My diaphragm function, the way my throat feels, is not compromised in any way. But I do have to think about it more now. I have to remind myself to keep my ribs open. I have to remind myself, if my breath starts to stack. When I took a breath before, the weight would kick in and give it that extra whhoomf! Now it doesn't do that. If I don't remember to get rid of the old air and re-engage the muscles, the breath starts stacking, and that's when you can't get your phrase, you crack high notes.

Callas attributed her problems to a loss of confidence brought about by a loss of breath support, even though she does not make the connection between her weight and her breath support. In an April 1977 interview with journalist Philippe Caloni, she stated,

My best recordings were made when I was skinny, and I say skinny, not slim, because I worked a lot and couldn't gain weight back; I became even too skinny ... I had my greatest successes – Lucia, Sonnambula, Medea, Anna Bolena – when I was skinny as a nail. Even for my first time here in Paris in 1958 when the show was broadcast through Eurovision, I was skinny. Really skinny."

And shortly before her death, Callas confided her own thoughts on her vocal problems to Peter Dragadze:

I never lost my voice, but I lost strength in my diaphragm. ... Because of those organic complaints, I lost my courage and boldness. My vocal cords were and still are in excellent condition, but my 'sound boxes' have not been working well even though I have been to all the doctors. The result was that I overstrained my voice, and that caused it to wobble. (Gente, October 1, 1977)

Whether Callas's vocal decline was due to ill health, early menopause, over-use and abuse of her voice, loss of breath-support, loss of confidence, or weight loss will continue to be debated. Whatever the cause may have been, her singing career was effectively over by age 40, and even at the time of her death at age 53, according to Walter Legge, "she ought still to have been singing magnificently".

==== Fussi and Paolillo report ====
A 2010 study by Italian vocal researchers Franco Fussi and Nico Paolillo revealed Callas was very ill at the time of her death and her illness was related to her vocal deterioration. According to their findings, presented at the University of Bologna in 2010, Callas had dermatomyositis, a rare connective tissue disease that causes a failure of the muscles and ligaments, including the larynx. They believe she was showing signs of this disease as early as the 1960s. Fussi and Paolillo cite an initial report by physician Mario Giacovazzo, who in 2002 revealed he had diagnosed Callas with dermatomyositis in 1975. Treatment included corticosteroids and immunosuppressive agents, which affect heart function.

At an event hosted by the journal Il Saggiatore Musicale, Fussi and Paolillo presented documentation showing when and how her voice changed over time. Using modern audio technology, they analyzed live Callas studio recordings from the 1950s through the 1970s, looking for signs of deterioration. Spectrographic analysis showed that she was losing the top half of her range. Fussi observed video recordings in which Callas's posture seemed strained and weakened. He felt that her drastic weight loss in 1954 further contributed to reduced physical support of her voice.

Fussi and Paolillo also examined restored footage of the infamous 1958 Norma "walkout" in Rome, which led to harsh criticism of Callas as a temperamental superstar. By applying spectrographic analysis to that footage, the researchers observed her voice was tired and she lacked control and that she had bronchitis and tracheitis as she claimed, and that the dermatomyositis was already causing her muscles to deteriorate.

=== Scandals and later career ===
External image
- Callas yelling at US Marshal after Butterfly, Chicago 1955

The latter half of Callas's career was marked by a number of scandals. Following a performance of Madama Butterfly in Chicago in 1955, Callas was confronted by a process server who handed her papers about a lawsuit brought by Eddy Bagarozy, who claimed he was her agent. Callas was photographed with her mouth turned in a furious snarl. The photo was sent around the world and gave rise to the myth of Callas as a temperamental prima donna and a "Tigress".

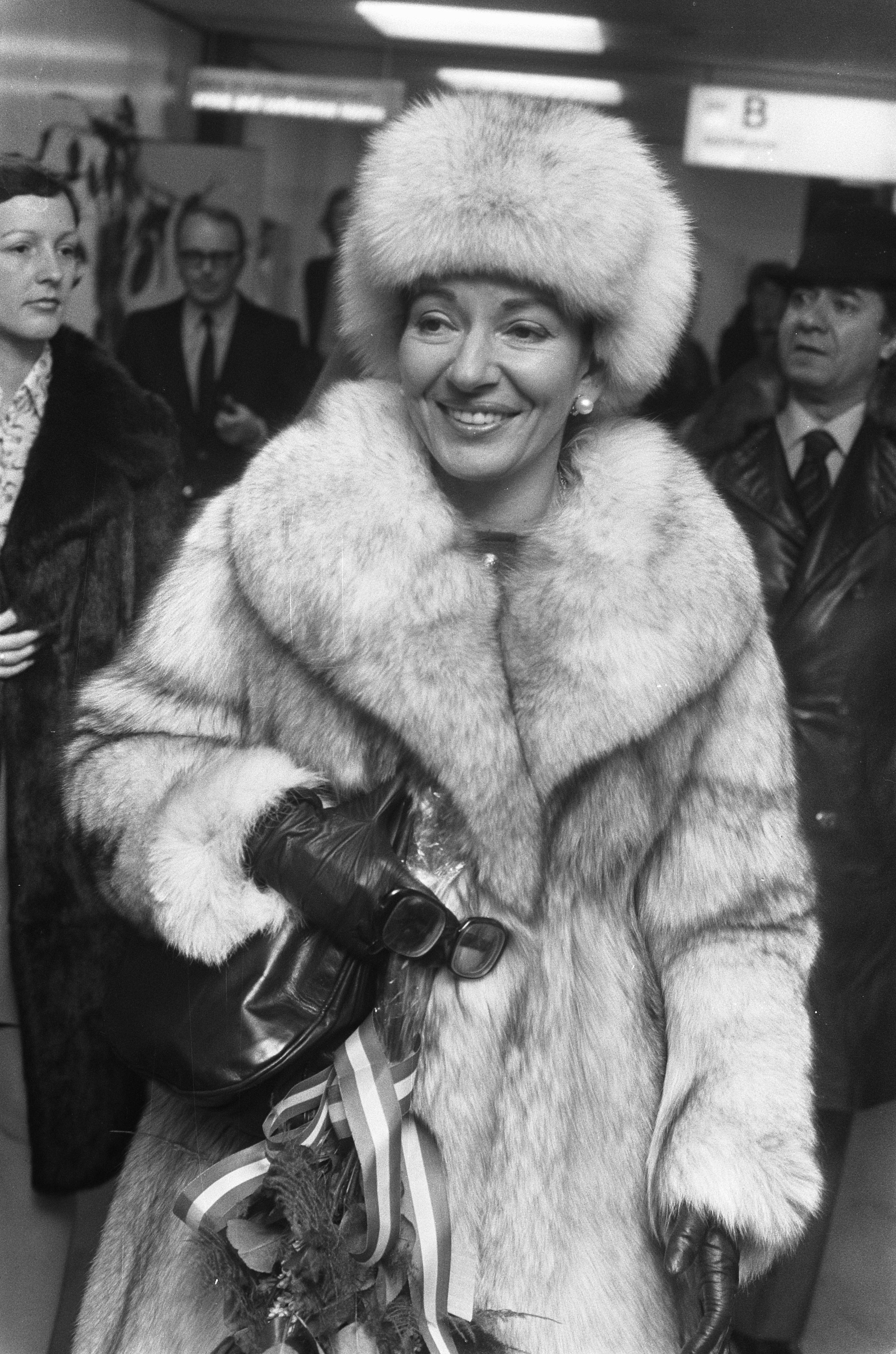
Callas in 1973

In 1956, just before her debut at the Metropolitan Opera, Time ran a damaging cover story about Callas, with special attention paid to her difficult relationship with her mother and some unpleasant exchanges between the two.

In 1957, Callas was starring as Amina in La sonnambula at the Edinburgh International Festival with the forces of La Scala. Her contract was for four performances, but due to the great success of the series, La Scala decided to put on a fifth performance. Callas told the La Scala officials that she was physically exhausted and that she had already committed to a previous engagement, a party thrown for her by her friend Elsa Maxwell in Venice. Despite this, La Scala announced a fifth performance, with Callas billed as Amina. Callas refused to stay and went on to Venice. Despite the fact that she had fulfilled her contract, she was accused of walking out on La Scala and the festival. La Scala officials did not defend Callas or inform the press that the additional performance was not approved by Callas. Renata Scotto took over the part, which was the start of her international career.

In January 1958, Callas was to open the Rome Opera House season with Norma, with Italy's president, Giovanni Gronchi, in attendance. The day before the opening night, Callas alerted the management that she was not well and that they should have a standby ready. She was told "No one can double Callas". After being treated by doctors, she felt better on the day of performance and decided to go ahead with the opera. A surviving bootleg recording of the first act reveals Callas sounding ill. Feeling that her voice was slipping away, she felt that she could not complete the performance, and consequently, she cancelled after the first act. She was accused of walking out on the president of Italy in a fit of temperament, and pandemonium broke out. Doctors confirmed that Callas had bronchitis and tracheitis, and the President's wife called to tell her they knew she was sick. However, they made no statements to the media, and the endless stream of press coverage aggravated the situation.

A newsreel included file footage of Callas from 1955 sounding well, intimating the footage was of rehearsals for the Rome Norma, with the voiceover narration, "Here she is in rehearsal, sounding perfectly healthy", followed by "If you want to hear Callas, don't get all dressed up. Just go to a rehearsal; she usually stays to the end of those."

Callas's relationship with La Scala had also started to become strained after the Edinburgh incident, and this effectively severed her major ties with her artistic home. Later in 1958, Callas and Rudolf Bing were in discussion about her season at the Met. She was scheduled to perform in Verdi's La traviata and in Macbeth, two very different operas which almost require totally different singers. Callas and the Met could not reach an agreement, and before the opening of Medea in Dallas, Bing sent a telegram to Callas terminating her contract. Headlines of "Bing Fires Callas" appeared in newspapers around the world. Nicola Rescigno later recalled, "That night, she came to the theater, looking like an empress: she wore an ermine thing that draped to the floor, and she had every piece of jewellery she ever owned. And she said, 'You all know what's happened. Tonight, for me, is a very difficult night, and I will need the help of every one of you.' Well, she proceeded to give a performance [of Medea] that was historical."

Bing later said that Callas was the most difficult artist he ever worked with, "because she was so much more intelligent. Other artists, you could get around. But Callas you could not get around. She knew exactly what she wanted, and why she wanted it." Despite this, Bing's admiration for Callas never wavered, and in September 1959, he sneaked into La Scala in order to listen to Callas record La Gioconda for EMI. Callas and Bing reconciled in the mid 1960s, and Callas returned to the Met for two performances of Tosca with her friend Tito Gobbi.

In her final years as a singer, she sang in Medea and Norma, and Tosca in Paris, New York, and London from January–February 1964. Her last stage performance was July 5, 1965, at Covent Garden. A live television transmission of act 2 of the Covent Garden Tosca of 1964 was broadcast in Britain on February 9, 1964, giving a rare view of Callas in performance and of her on-stage collaboration with Tito Gobbi, directed by Carlo Felice Cillario.

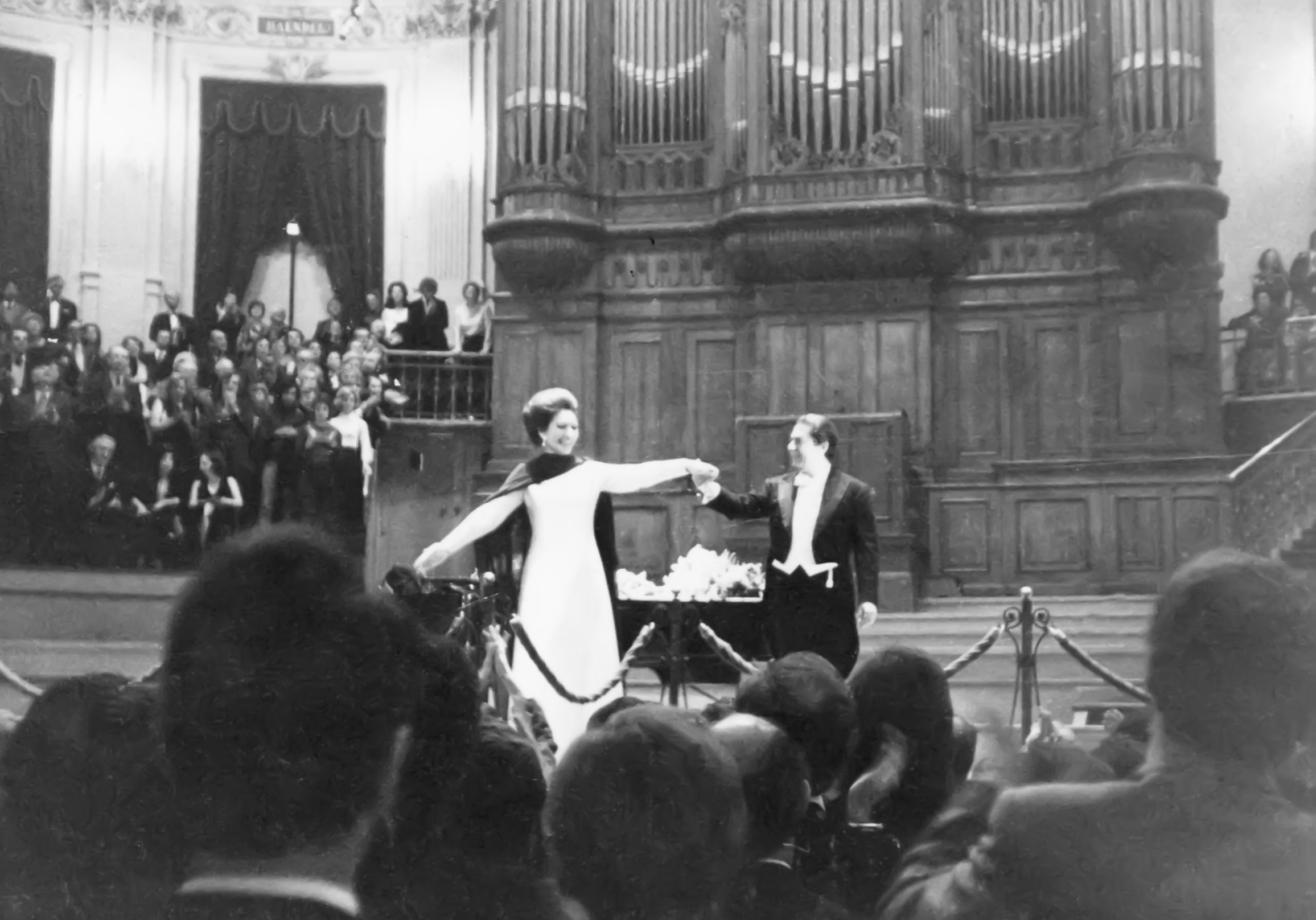
Callas during her final tour in Amsterdam in 1973

In 1969, the Italian filmmaker Pier Paolo Pasolini cast Callas in her only non-operatic acting role, as the Greek mythological character of Medea, in his film by that name. The production was grueling, and according to the account in Ardoin's Callas, the Art and the Life, Callas is said to have fainted after a day of strenuous running back and forth on a mudflat in the sun. The film was not a commercial success, but as Callas's only film appearance, it documents something of her stage presence.

From October 1971 to March 1972, Callas gave a series of master classes at the Juilliard School in New York. These classes later formed the basis of Terrence McNally's 1995 play Master Class. Callas staged a series of joint recitals in Europe in 1973 and in the U.S., South Korea, and Japan in 1974 with the tenor Giuseppe Di Stefano. Critically, this was a musical disaster owing to both performers' worn-out voices. However, the tour was an enormous popular success. Audiences thronged to hear the two performers, who had so often appeared together in their prime. Her final public performance was on November 11, 1974, in Sapporo, Japan. Callas and Di Stefano were to have appeared together in four staged performances of Tosca in Japan in late 1975 but Callas cancelled.

=== Onassis, final years, and death ===
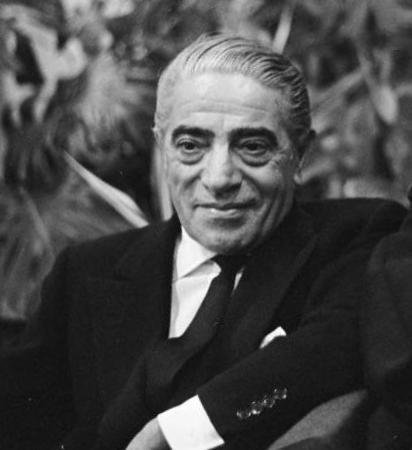
Aristotle Onassis

In 1957, while still married to husband Giovanni Battista Meneghini, Callas was introduced to Greek shipping magnate Aristotle Onassis at a party given in her honor by Elsa Maxwell after a performance in Donizetti's Anna Bolena. The affair that followed received much publicity in the popular press, and in November 1959, Callas left her husband. Michael Scott asserts that Onassis was not sure why Callas largely abandoned her career, but that he offered her a way out of a career that was made increasingly difficult by scandals and by vocal resources that were diminishing at an alarming rate. Franco Zeffirelli, on the other hand, recalls asking Callas in 1963 why she had not practiced her singing, and Callas responding that "I have been trying to fulfill my life as a woman."

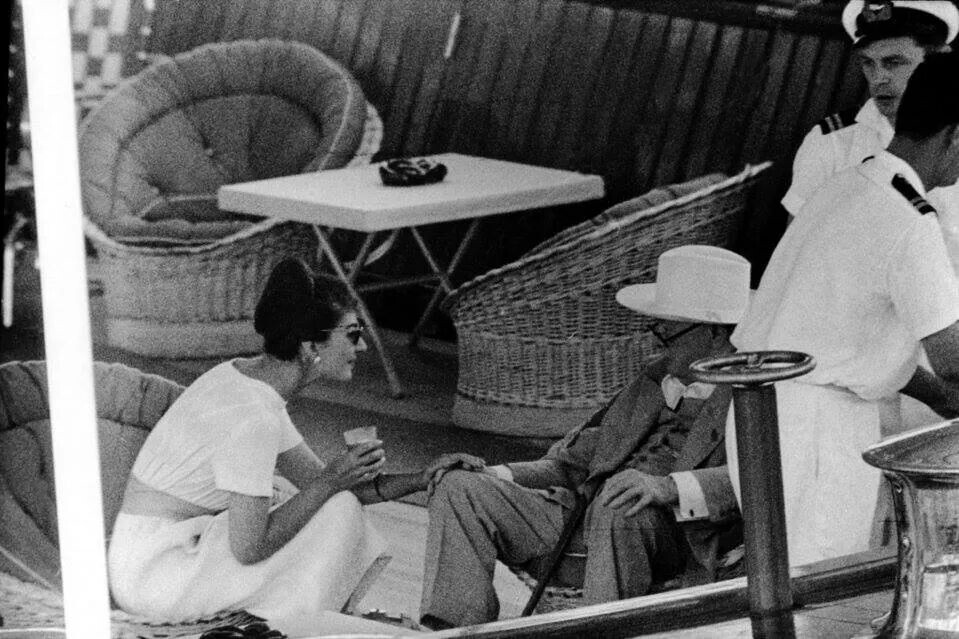
Callas with Winston Churchill on Onassis' yacht in the late 50s

According to one of her biographers, Nicholas Gage, Callas and Onassis had a child, a boy, who died hours after he was born on March 30, 1960. In his book about his wife, Meneghini states categorically that Maria Callas was unable to bear children. Various sources also dismiss Gage's claim, as they note that the birth certificates Gage used to prove this "secret child" were issued in 1998, twenty-one years after Callas's death. Still other sources claim that Callas had at least one abortion while involved with Onassis.

In 1966, Callas renounced her U.S. citizenship at the American Embassy in Paris, to facilitate the end of her marriage to Meneghini. This was because after her renunciation, she was only a Greek citizen, and under Greek law of that time, a Greek could legally marry only in a Greek Orthodox church. As she had married in a Roman Catholic church, this divorced her in Greece. The renunciation also helped her finances, as she no longer had to pay U.S. taxes on her income. Her relationship with Onassis ended two years later in 1968, when he left Callas and married Jacqueline Kennedy. However, the Onassis family's private secretary, Kiki, writes in her memoir that even while Onassis was with his new wife, he frequently met Callas in Paris, where they resumed what had now become a clandestine affair.

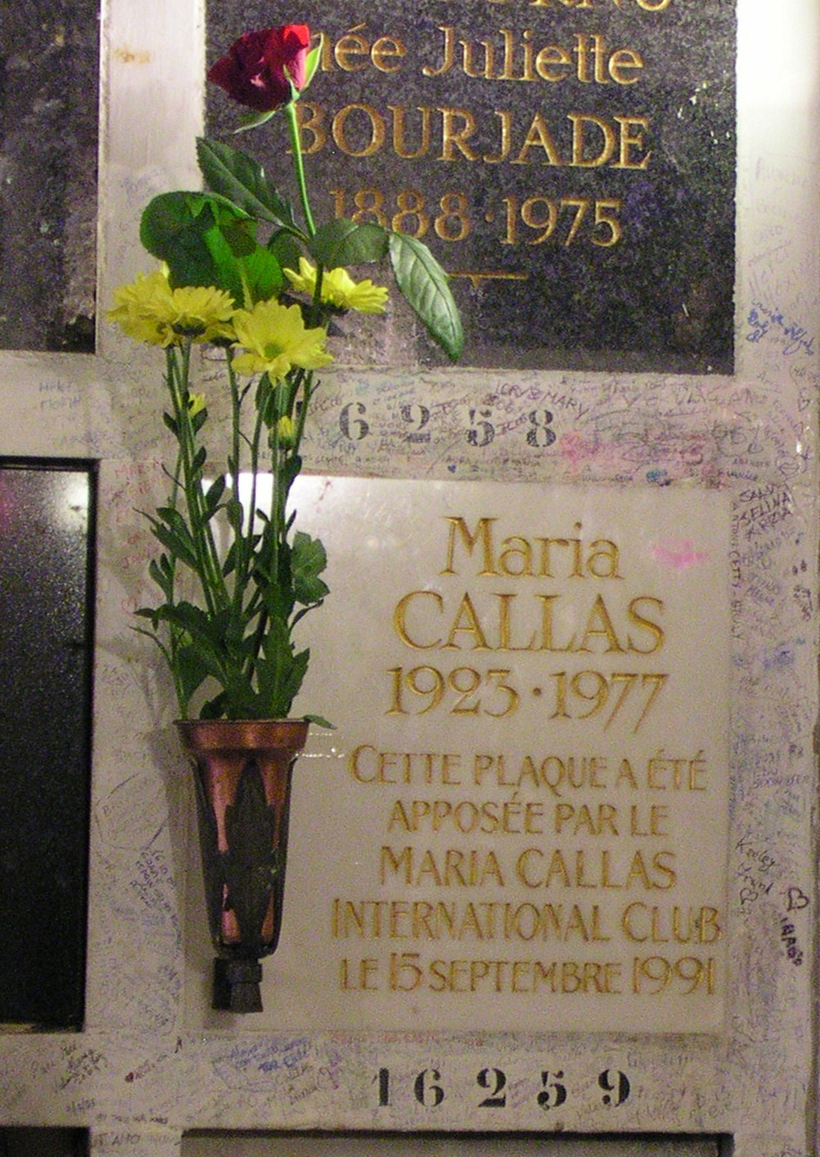
The cenotaph of Maria Callas at the Père Lachaise Cemetery in Paris.

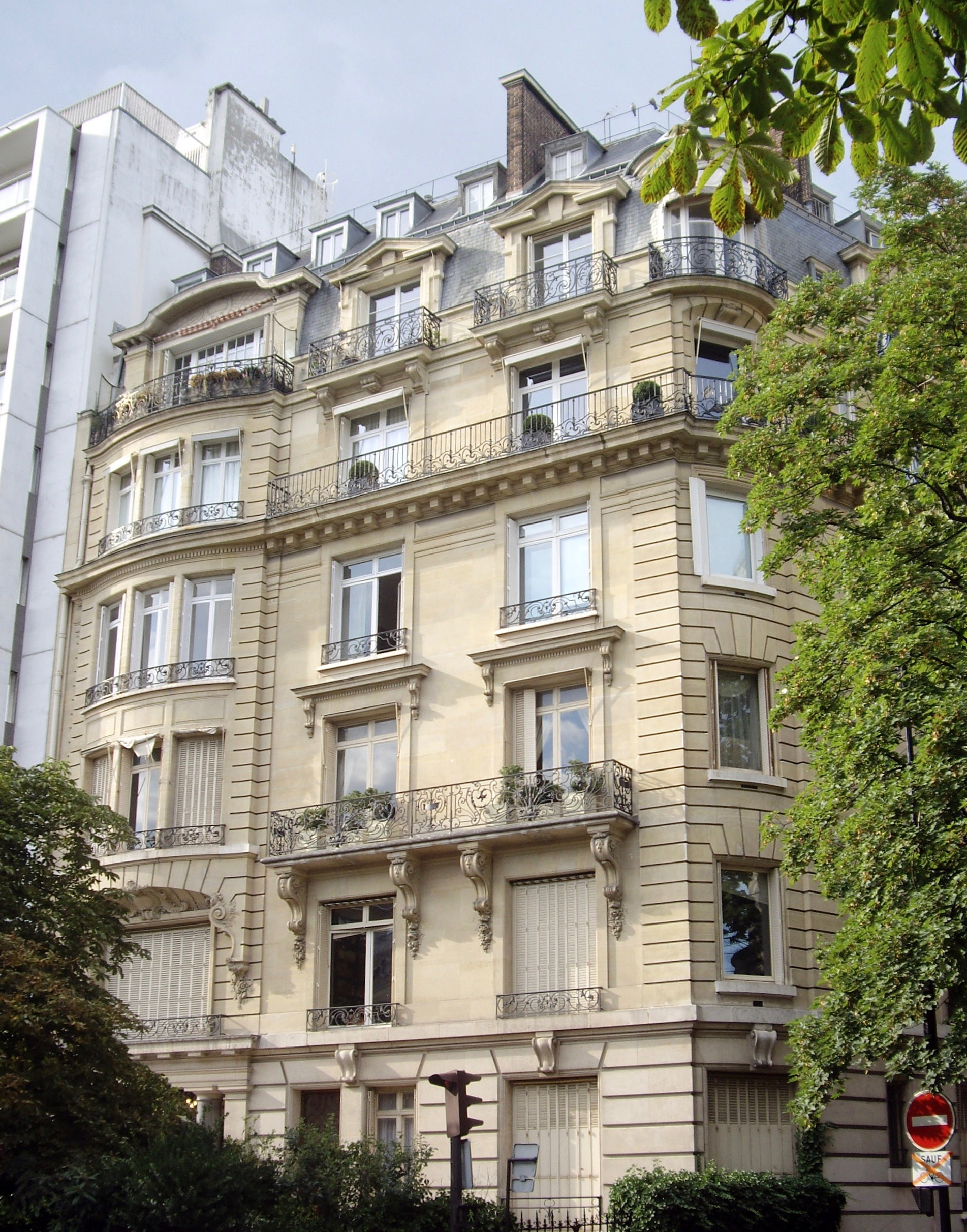
The last residence of Maria Callas, in Paris

Callas spent her last years living largely in isolation in Paris and died of a heart attack at the age of 53 on September 16, 1977.

A funerary liturgy was held at St Stephen's Greek Orthodox Cathedral on rue Georges-Bizet, Paris on September 20, 1977. She was later cremated at the Père Lachaise Cemetery and her ashes were placed in the columbarium there. After being stolen and later recovered, they were scattered over the Aegean Sea, off the coast of Greece, according to her wish, in the spring of 1979.

During a 1978 interview, upon being asked "Was it worth it to Maria Callas? She was a lonely, unhappy, often difficult woman", music critic and Callas's friend John Ardoin replied:

That's such a difficult question. There are times, you know, when there are people – certain people who are blessed, and cursed, with an extraordinary gift, in which the gift is almost greater than the human being. And Callas was one of these people. It was almost as if her wishes, her life, her own happiness were all subservient to this incredible, incredible gift that she was given, this gift that reached out and taught us all – taught us things about music we knew very well, but showed us new things, things we never thought about, new possibilities. I think that's why singers admire her so; I think that's why conductors admire her so; I know that's why I admire her so. And she paid a tremendously difficult and expensive price for this career. I don't think she always understood what she did or why she did. She knew she had a tremendous effect on audiences and on people. But it was not something that she could always live with gracefully or happily. I once said to her, "It must be very enviable to be Maria Callas." And she said, "No, it's a very terrible thing to be Maria Callas, because it's a question of trying to understand something you can never really understand." Because she couldn't explain what she did – it was all done by instinct; it was something, incredibly, embedded deep within her.

==== Estate ====
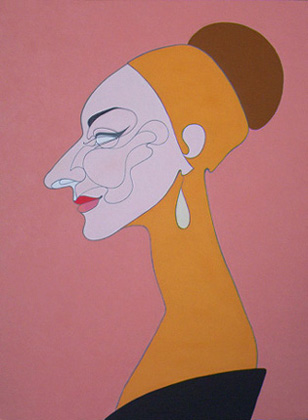
Portrait of Callas (2004), by Oleg Karuvits

According to several Callas biographers, Vasso Devetzi, a Greek pianist near the same age as Callas, insinuated herself into Callas's trust during her last years and acted virtually as her agent. This claim is corroborated by Callas' sister Yakinthi "Jackie" in her 1990 book Sisters, wherein she asserts that Devetzi conned Maria out of control of half of her estate while promising to establish the Maria Callas Foundation to provide scholarships for young singers; after hundreds of thousands of dollars had allegedly vanished, Devetzi finally did establish the foundation.

== Voice ==
=== The Callas sound ===
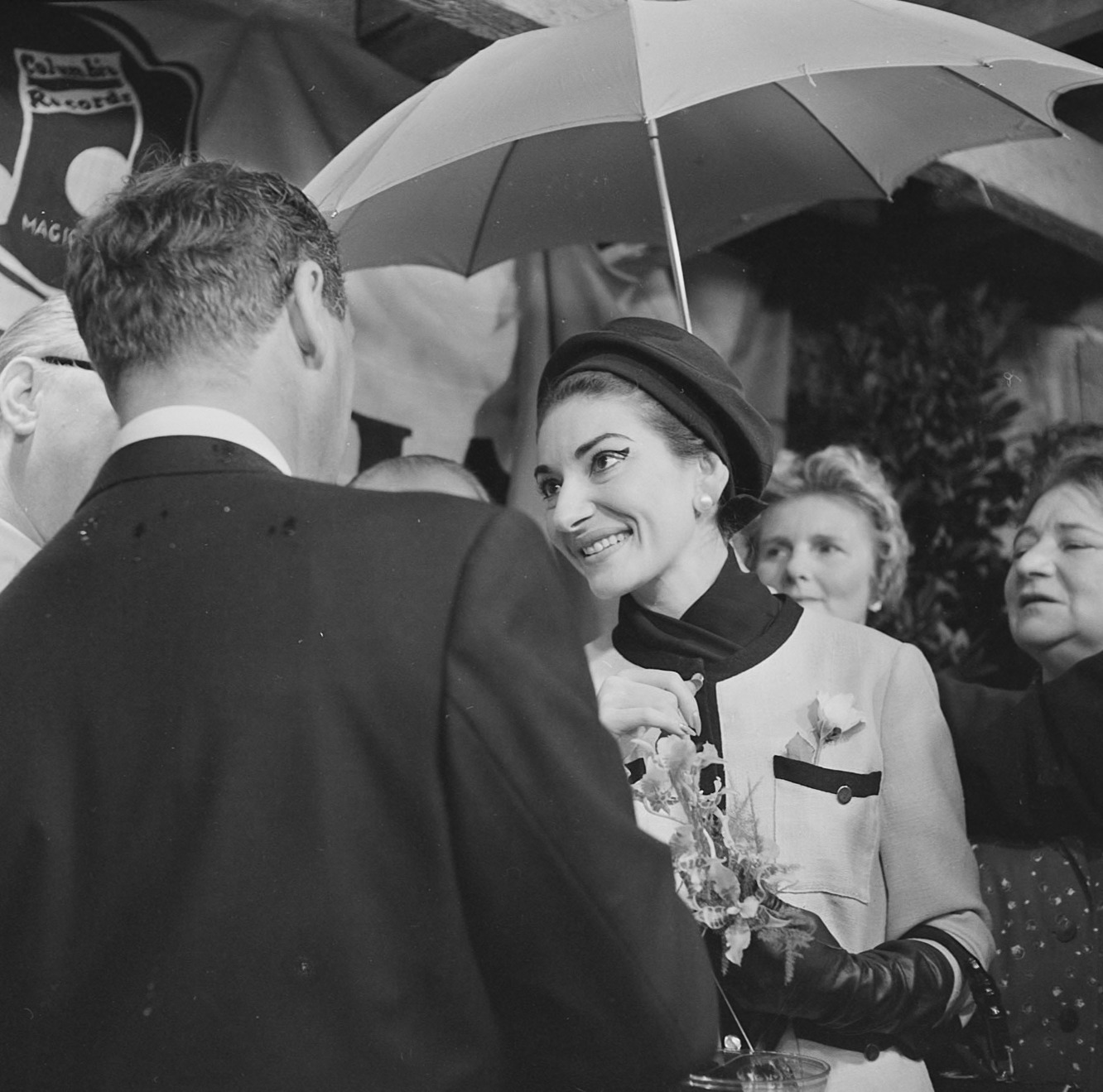
Callas in the Netherlands, 1959

Callas's voice elicited diverging reactions. Walter Legge stated that Callas possessed that most essential ingredient for a great singer: an instantly recognizable voice.

During "The Callas Debate", Italian critic Rodolfo Celletti stated, "The timbre of Callas' voice, considered purely as sound, was essentially ugly: it was a thick sound, which gave the impression of dryness, of aridity. It lacked those elements which, in a singer's jargon, are described as velvet and varnish ... yet I really believe that part of her appeal was precisely due to this fact. Why? Because for all its natural lack of varnish, velvet and richness, this voice could acquire such distinctive colours and timbres as to be unforgettable." However, in his review of Callas's 1951 live recording of I vespri siciliani, Ira Siff writes, "Accepted wisdom tells us that Callas possessed, even early on, a flawed voice, unattractive by conventional standards—an instrument that signaled from the beginning vocal problems to come. Yet listen to her entrance in this performance and one encounters a rich, spinning sound, ravishing by any standard, capable of delicate dynamic nuance. High notes are free of wobble, chest tones unforced, and the middle register displays none of the 'bottled' quality that became more and more pronounced as Callas matured."

Nicola Rossi-Lemeni relates that Callas's mentor Serafin used to refer to her as Una grande vociaccia; he continues, "Vociaccia is a little bit pejorative—it means an ugly voice—but grande means a big voice, a great voice. A great ugly voice, in a way." Callas did not like the sound of her own voice; in one of her last interviews, answering whether or not she was able to listen to her own voice, she replied,

Yes, but I don't like it. I have to do it, but I don't like it at all because I don't like the kind of voice I have. I really hate listening to myself! The first time I listened to a recording of my singing was when we were recording San Giovanni Battista by Stradella in a church in Perugia in 1949. They made me listen to the tape and I cried my eyes out. I wanted to stop everything, to give up singing... Also now even though I don't like my voice, I've become able to accept it and to be detached and objective about it so I can say, "Oh, that was really well sung," or "It was nearly perfect."

Carlo Maria Giulini has described the appeal of Callas's voice:

It is very difficult to speak of the voice of Callas. Her voice was a very special instrument. Something happens sometimes with string instruments—violin, viola, cello—where the first moment you listen to the sound of this instrument, the first feeling is a bit strange sometimes. But after just a few minutes, when you get used to, when you become friends with this kind of sound, then the sound becomes a magical quality. This was Callas.

=== Vocal category ===
Callas's voice has been difficult to place in the modern vocal classification or Fach system, especially as in her prime her repertoire contained the heaviest dramatic soprano roles as well as roles usually undertaken by the highest, lightest and most agile coloratura sopranos. Regarding this versatility, Serafin said, "This woman can sing anything written for the female voice". Michael Scott argues that Callas's voice was a natural high soprano, and going by evidence of Callas's early recordings Rosa Ponselle likewise felt that "At that stage of its development, her voice was a pure but sizable dramatic coloratura—that is to say, a sizable coloratura voice with dramatic capabilities, not the other way around." On the other hand, music critic John Ardoin has argued that Callas was the reincarnation of the 19th-century soprano sfogato or "unlimited soprano", a throwback to Maria Malibran and Giuditta Pasta, for whom many of the famous bel canto operas were written. He avers that like Pasta and Malibran, Callas was a natural mezzo-soprano whose range was extended through training and willpower, resulting in a voice which "lacked the homogeneous color and evenness of scale once so prized in singing. There were unruly sections of their voices never fully under control. Many who heard Pasta, for example, remarked that her uppermost notes seemed produced by ventriloquism, a charge which would later be made against Callas". Ardoin points to the writings of Henry Chorley about Pasta which bear an uncanny resemblance to descriptions of Callas:

There was a portion of the scale which differed from the rest in quality and remained to the last 'under a veil.' ... out of these uncouth materials she had to compose her instrument and then to give it flexibility. Her studies to acquire execution must have been tremendous; but the volubility and brilliancy, when acquired, gained a character of their own ... There were a breadth, an expressiveness in her roulades, an evenness and solidity in her shake, which imparted to every passage a significance totally beyond the reach of lighter and more spontaneous singers ... The best of her audience were held in thrall, without being able to analyze what made up the spell, what produced the effect—as soon as she opened her lips.

Callas appears to have been in agreement not only with Ardoin's assertions that she started as a natural mezzo-soprano, but also saw the similarities between herself and Pasta and Malibran. In 1957, she described her early voice: "The timbre was dark, almost black—when I think of it, I think of thick molasses", and in 1968 she added, "They say I was not a true soprano, I was rather toward a mezzo". Regarding her ability to sing the heaviest as well as the lightest roles, she told James Fleetwood,

It's study; it's Nature. I'm doing nothing special, you know. Even Lucia, Anna Bolena, Puritani, all these operas were created for one type of soprano, the type that sang Norma, Fidelio, which was Malibran of course. And a funny coincidence last year, I was singing Anna Bolena and Sonnambula, same months and the same distance of time as Giuditta Pasta had sung in the nineteenth century ... So I'm really not doing anything extraordinary. You wouldn't ask a pianist not to be able to play everything; he has to. This is Nature and also because I had a wonderful teacher, the old kind of teaching methods ... I was a very heavy voice, that is my nature, a dark voice shall we call it, and I was always kept on the light side. She always trained me to keep my voice limber.

=== Vocal size and range ===
Callas's range in performance (highest and lowest notes both shown in red): from F-sharp below the Middle C (green) to E-natural above the High C (blue)

Regarding the sheer size of Callas's instrument, Rodolfo Celletti says, "Her voice was penetrating. The volume as such was average: neither small nor powerful. But the penetration, allied to this incisive quality (which bordered on the ugly because it frequently contained an element of harshness) ensured that her voice could be clearly heard anywhere in the auditorium." Celletti wrote that Callas had "a voluminous, penetrating, and dark voice" (una voce voluminosa, squillante e di timbro scuro). After her first performance of Medea in 1953, the critic for Musical Courier wrote that "she displayed a vocal generosity that was scarcely believable for its amplitude and resilience." In a 1982 Opera News interview with Joan Sutherland and Richard Bonynge, Bonynge stated, "But before she slimmed down, I mean this was such a colossal voice. It just poured out of her, the way Flagstad's did .... Callas had a huge voice. When she and Stignani sang Norma, at the bottom of the range you could barely tell who was who ... Oh it was colossal. And she took the big sound right up to the top." In his book, Michael Scott makes the distinction that whereas Callas's pre-1954 voice was a "dramatic soprano with an exceptional top", after the weight loss, it became, as one Chicago critic described the voice in Lucia, a "huge soprano leggiero".

In performance, Callas's vocal range was just short of three octaves, from F-sharp (F♯_{3}) below middle C (C_{4}) heard in "Arrigo! Ah parli a un core" from I vespri siciliani to E-natural (E_{6}) above high C (C_{6}), heard in the aria "Mercè, dilette amiche" in the final act of the same opera, as well as in Rossini's Armida and Lakmé's Bell Song. Whether or not Callas ever sang a high F-natural in performance has been open to debate. After her June 11, 1951, concert in Florence, Rock Ferris of Musical Courier said, "Her high E's and F's are taken full voice." Although no definite recording of Callas singing high Fs has surfaced, the presumed E-natural at the end of Rossini's Armida—a poor-quality bootleg recording of uncertain pitch—has been referred to as a high F by Italian musicologists and critics Eugenio Gara and Rodolfo Celletti. Callas expert Dr. Robert Seletsky, however, stated that since the finale of Armida is in the key of E, the final note could not have been an F, as it would have been dissonant. Author Eve Ruggieri has referred to the penultimate note in "Mercè, dilette amiche" from the 1951 Florence performances of I vespri siciliani as a high F; however, this claim is refuted by John Ardoin's review of the live recording of the performance as well as by the review of the recording in Opera News, both of which refer to the note as a high E-natural.

In a 1969 French television interview with Pierre Desgraupes on the program L'invitée du dimanche, Francesco Siciliani speaks of Callas's voice going to high F (he also talked about her lower register extending to C_{3}), but within the same program, Callas's teacher, Elvira de Hidalgo, speaks of the voice soaring to a high E-natural but does not mention a high F. Callas remained silent on the subject, neither confirming nor denying either claim.

=== Vocal registers ===
Callas's voice was noted for its three distinct registers: Her low or chest register was extremely dark and powerful, and she used this part of her voice for dramatic effect, often going into this register much higher on the scale than most sopranos. Her middle register had a peculiar and highly personal sound—"part oboe, part clarinet", as Claudia Cassidy described it—and was noted for its veiled or "bottled" sound, as if she were singing into a jug. Walter Legge, husband of diva Elisabeth Schwarzkopf, attributed this sound to the "extraordinary formation of her upper palate, shaped like a Gothic arch, not the Romanesque arch of the normal mouth".

The upper register was ample and bright, with an impressive extension above high C, which—in contrast to the light flute-like sound of the typical coloratura, "she would attack these notes with more vehemence and power—quite differently therefore, from the very delicate, cautious, 'white' approach of the light sopranos." Legge adds, "Even in the most difficult fioriture there were no musical or technical difficulties in this part of the voice which she could not execute with astonishing, unostentatious ease. Her chromatic runs, particularly downwards, were beautifully smooth and staccatos almost unfailingly accurate, even in the trickiest intervals. There is hardly a bar in the whole range of nineteenth-century music for high soprano that seriously tested her powers." And as she demonstrated in the finale of La sonnambula on the commercial EMI set and the live recording from Cologne, she was able to execute a diminuendo on the stratospheric high E-flat, which Scott describes as "a feat unrivaled in the history of the gramophone."

Regarding Callas's soft singing, Celletti says, "In these soft passages, Callas seemed to use another voice altogether, because it acquired a great sweetness. Whether in her florid singing or in her canto spianato, that is, in long held notes without ornamentation, her mezza voce could achieve such moving sweetness that the sound seemed to come from on high ... I don't know, it seemed to come from the skylight of La Scala."

This combination of size, weight, range and agility was a source of amazement to Callas's own contemporaries. One of the choristers present at her La Scala debut in I vespri siciliani recalled, "My God! She came on stage sounding like our deepest contralto, Cloe Elmo. And before the evening was over, she took a high E-flat. And it was twice as strong as Toti Dal Monte's!" In the same vein, mezzo-soprano Giulietta Simionato said: "The first time we sang together was in Mexico in 1950, where she sang the top E-flat in the second-act finale of Aida. I can still remember the effect of that note in the opera house—it was like a star!" For Italian soprano Renata Tebaldi, "the most fantastic thing was the possibility for her to sing the soprano coloratura with this big voice! This was something really special. Fantastic absolutely!"

Callas's vocal registers, however, were not seamlessly joined; Walter Legge writes, "Unfortunately, it was only in quick music, particularly descending scales, that she completely mastered the art of joining the three almost incompatible voices into one unified whole, but until about 1960, she disguised those audible gear changes with cunning skill." Rodolfo Celletti states,

In certain areas of her range her voice also possessed a guttural quality. This would occur in the most delicate and troublesome areas of a soprano's voice—for instance where the lower and middle registers merge, between G and A. I would go so far as to say that here her voice had such resonances as to make one think at times of a ventriloquist ... or else the voice could sound as though it were resonating in a rubber tube. There was another troublesome spot ... between the middle and upper registers. Here, too, around the treble F and G, there was often something in the sound itself which was not quite right, as though the voice were not functioning properly.

As to whether these troublesome spots were due to the nature of the voice or to technical deficiencies, Celletti says: "Even if, when passing from one register to another, Callas produced an unpleasant sound, the technique she used for these transitions was perfect." Musicologist and critic Fedele D'Amico adds, "Callas' 'faults' were in the voice and not in the singer; they are so to speak, faults of departure but not of arrival. This is precisely Celletti's distinction between the natural quality of the voice and the technique." In 2005, Ewa Podleś said of Callas, "Maybe she had three voices, maybe she had three ranges, I don't know—I am a professional singer. Nothing disturbed me, nothing! I bought everything that she offered me. Why? Because all of her voices, her registers, she used how they should be used—just to tell us something!"

Eugenio Gara states, "Much has been said about her voice, and no doubt the discussion will continue. Certainly no one could in honesty deny the harsh or "squashed" sounds, nor the wobble on the very high notes. These and others were precisely the accusations made at the time against Pasta and Malibran, two geniuses of song (as they were then called), sublime, yet imperfect. Both were brought to trial in their day. ... Yet few singers have made history in the annals of opera as these two did."

== Artistry ==
=== The musician ===
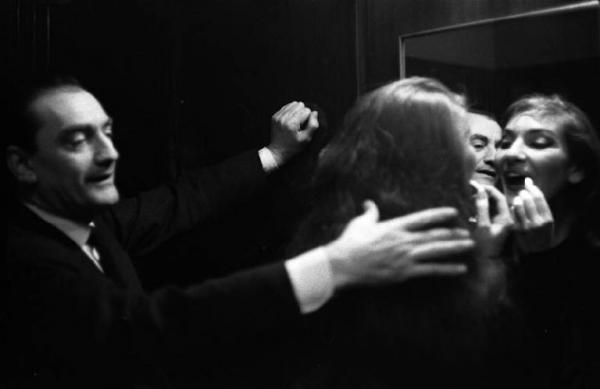
Callas getting ready in company of Luchino Visconti in Milan, 1957

Adored by many opera enthusiasts, Callas was a controversial artist. Although Callas was the great singer often dismissed simply as an actress, Callas considered herself foremost a musician, that is, the first instrument of the orchestra." Grace Bumbry has stated, "If I followed the musical score when [Callas] was singing, I would see every tempo marking, every dynamic marking, everything being adhered to, and at the same time, it was not antiseptic; it was something that was very beautiful and moving." Victor de Sabata confided to Walter Legge, "If the public could understand, as we do, how deeply and utterly musical Callas is, they would be stunned", and Serafin assessed Callas's musicality as "extraordinary, almost frightening." Callas possessed an innate architectural sense of line-proportion and an uncanny feel for timing and for what one of Callas's colleagues described as "a sense of the rhythm within the rhythm".

Regarding Callas's technical prowess, Celletti says, "We must not forget that she could tackle the whole gamut of ornamentation: staccato, trills, half-trills, gruppetti, scales, etc." D'Amico adds, "The essential virtue of Callas' technique consists of supreme mastery of an extraordinarily rich range of tone colour (that is, the fusion of dynamic range and timbre). And such mastery means total freedom of choice in its use: not being a slave to one's abilities, but rather, being able to use them at will as a means to an end." While reviewing the many recorded versions of "perhaps Verdi's ultimate challenge", the aria "D'amor sull'ali rosee" from Il trovatore, Richard Dyer writes,

Callas articulates all of the trills, and she binds them into the line more expressively than anyone else; they are not an ornament but a form of intensification. Part of the wonder in this performance is the chiaroscuro through her tone—the other side of not singing full-out all the way through. One of the vocal devices that create that chiaroscuro is a varying rate of vibrato; another is her portamento, the way she connects the voice from note to note, phrase to phrase, lifting and gliding. This is never a sloppy swoop, because its intention is as musically precise as it is in great string playing. In this aria, Callas uses more portamento, and in greater variety, than any other singer ... Callas is not creating "effects", as even her greatest rivals do. She sees the aria as a whole, "as if in an aerial view", as Sviatoslav Richter's teacher observed of his most famous pupil; simultaneously, she is on earth, standing in the courtyard of the palace of Aliaferia, floating her voice to the tower where her lover lies imprisoned.

In addition to her musical skills, Callas had a particular gift for language and the use of language in music. In recitatives, she always knew which word to emphasize and which syllable in that word to bring out. Michael Scott notes, "If we listen attentively, we note how her perfect legato enables her to suggest by musical means even the exclamation marks and commas of the text." Technically, not only did she have the capacity to perform the most difficult florid music effortlessly, but also she had the ability to use each ornament as an expressive device rather than for mere fireworks. Soprano Martina Arroyo states, "What interested me most was how she gave the runs and the cadenzas words. That always floored me. I always felt I heard her saying something—it was never just singing notes. That alone is an art." Walter Legge states that,

Most admirable of all her qualities, however, were her taste, elegance and deeply musical use of ornamentation in all its forms and complications, the weighting and length of every appoggiatura, the smooth incorporation of the turn in melodic lines, the accuracy and pacing of her trills, the seemingly inevitable timing of her portamentos, varying their curve with enchanting grace and meaning. There were innumerable exquisite felicities—minuscule portamentos from one note to its nearest neighbor, or over widespread intervals—and changes of color that were pure magic. In these aspects of bel canto she was supreme mistress of that art.

=== The actress ===
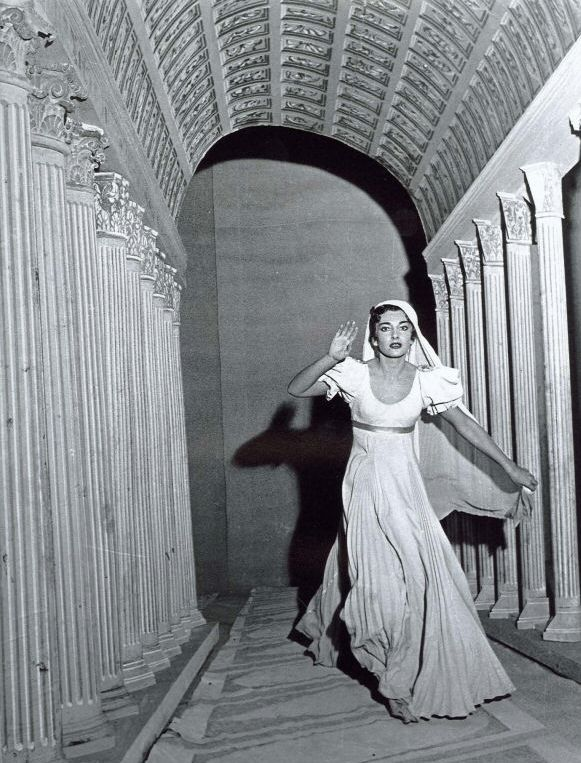
Callas as Giulia in the Opera "La Vestale", by Gaspare Spontini, 1954

Regarding Callas's acting ability, vocal coach and music critic Ira Siff remarked, "When I saw the final two Toscas she did in the old [Met], I felt like I was watching the actual story on which the opera had later been based." Callas was not, however, a realistic or verismo style actress: her physical acting was merely "subsidiary to the heavy Kunst of developing the psychology of the roles under the supervision of the music, of singing the acting ... Suffering, delight, humility, hubris, despair, rhapsody—all this was musically appointed, through her use of the voice flying the text upon the notes." Seconding this opinion, verismo specialist soprano Augusta Oltrabella said, "Despite what everyone says, [Callas] was an actress in the expression of the music, and not vice versa."

Matthew Gurewitsch adds,

In fact the essence of her art was refinement. The term seems odd for a performer whose imagination and means of expression were so prodigious. She was eminently capable of the grand gesture; still, judging strictly from the evidence of her recordings, we know (and her few existing film clips confirm) that her power flowed not from excess but from unbroken concentration, unfaltering truth in the moment. It flowed also from irreproachable musicianship. People say that Callas would not hesitate to distort a vocal line for dramatic effect. In the throes of operatic passion plenty of singers snarl, growl, whine, and shriek. Callas was not one of them. She found all she needed in the notes.

Ewa Podleś likewise stated that "It's enough to hear her, I'm positive! Because she could say everything only with her voice! I can imagine everything, I can see everything in front of my eye." Opera director Sandro Sequi, who witnessed many Callas performances close-up, states, "For me, she was extremely stylized and classic, yet at the same time, human—but humanity on a higher plane of existence, almost sublime. Realism was foreign to her, and that is why she was the greatest of opera singers. After all, opera is the least realistic of theater forms ... She was wasted in verismo roles, even Tosca, no matter how brilliantly she could act such roles." Scott adds, "Early nineteenth-century opera ... is not merely the antithesis of reality, it also requires highly stylized acting. Callas had the perfect face for it. Her big features matched its grandiloquence and spoke volumes from a distance."

In regard to Callas's physical acting style, Nicola Rescigno states, "Maria had a way of even transforming her body for the exigencies of a role, which is a great triumph. In La traviata, everything would slope down; everything indicated sickness, fatigue, softness. Her arms would move as if they had no bones, like the great ballerinas. In Medea, everything was angular. She'd never make a soft gesture; even the walk she used was like a tiger's walk." Sandro Sequi recalls, "She was never in a hurry. Everything was very paced, proportioned, classical, precise ... She was extremely powerful but extremely stylized. Her gestures were not many ... I don't think she did more than 20 gestures in a performance. But she was capable of standing 10 minutes without moving a hand or finger, compelling everyone to look at her." Edward Downes recalled Callas watching and observing her colleagues with such intensity and concentration as to make it seem that the drama was all unfolding in her head. Sir Rudolf Bing similarly recalled that in Il trovatore in Chicago, "it was Callas' quiet listening, rather than Björling's singing that made the dramatic impact ... He didn't know what he was singing, but she knew."

Callas stated that, in opera, acting must be based on the music, quoting Serafin's advice to her:

When one wants to find a gesture, when you want to find how to act onstage, all you have to do is listen to the music. The composer has already seen to that. If you take the trouble to really listen with your Soul and with your Ears—and I say 'Soul' and 'Ears' because the Mind must work, but not too much also—you will find every gesture there.

=== The artist ===
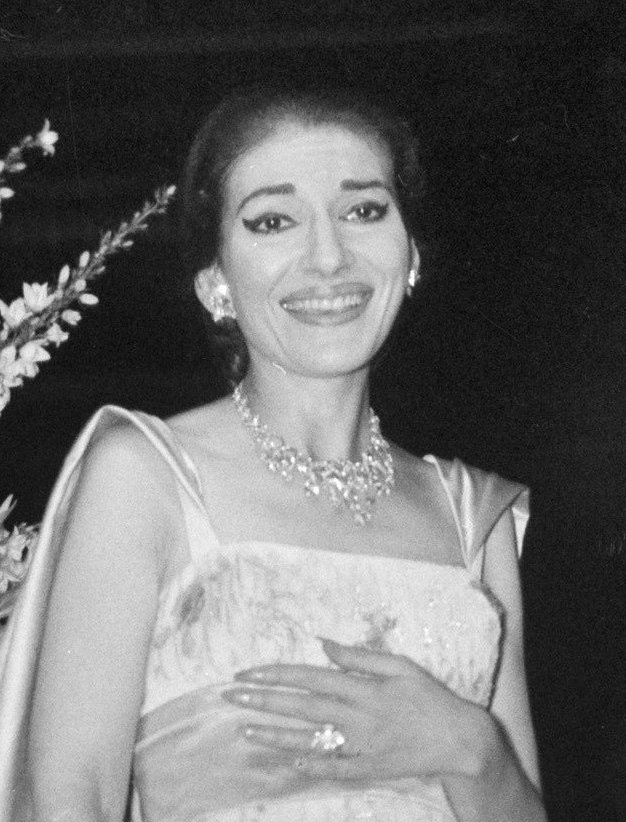
Callas acknowledges applause in 1959 at the Royal Concertgebouw in Amsterdam

Callas's most distinguishing quality was her ability to breathe life into the characters she portrayed, or in the words of Matthew Gurewitsch, "Most mysterious among her many gifts, Callas had the genius to translate the minute particulars of a life into tone of voice." Italian critic Eugenio Gara adds:

Her secret is in her ability to transfer to the musical plane the suffering of the character she plays, the nostalgic longing for lost happiness, the anxious fluctuation between hope and despair, between pride and supplication, between irony and generosity, which in the end dissolve into a superhuman inner pain. The most diverse and opposite of sentiments, cruel deceptions, ambitious desires, burning tenderness, grievous sacrifices, all the torments of the heart, acquire in her singing that mysterious truth, I would like to say, that psychological sonority, which is the primary attraction of opera.

Ethan Mordden writes, "It was a flawed voice. But then Callas sought to capture in her singing not just beauty but a whole humanity, and within her system, the flaws feed the feeling, the sour plangency and the strident defiance becoming aspects of the canto. They were literally defects of her voice; she bent them into advantages of her singing." Giulini believes, "If melodrama is the ideal unity of the trilogy of words, music, and action, it is impossible to imagine an artist in whom these three elements were more together than Callas." He recalls that during Callas's performances of La traviata, "reality was onstage. What stood behind me, the audience, auditorium, La Scala itself, seemed artifice. Only that which transpired on stage was truth, life itself." Sir Rudolf Bing expressed similar sentiments:

Once one heard and saw Maria Callas—one can't really distinguish it—in a part, it was very hard to enjoy any other artist, no matter how great, afterwards, because she imbued every part she sang and acted with such incredible personality and life. One move of her hand was more than another artist could do in a whole act.

To Antonino Votto, Callas was:

The last great artist. When you think this woman was nearly blind, and often sang standing a good 150 feet from the podium. But her sensitivity! Even if she could not see, she sensed the music and always came in exactly with my downbeat. When we rehearsed, she was so precise, already note-perfect ... She was not just a singer, but a complete artist. It's foolish to discuss her as a voice. She must be viewed totally—as a complex of music, drama, movement. There is no one like her today. She was an esthetic phenomenon.

== In popular culture ==
- Terrence McNally's play Master Class, which premiered in 1995, presents Callas as a glamorous, commanding, larger-than-life, caustic, and funny pedagogue holding a voice master class. Alternately dismayed and impressed by the students who parade before her, she retreats into recollections about the glories of her own life and career, culminating in a monologue about sacrifice taken for art. Several selections of Callas actually singing are played during the recollections. Callas was portrayed on Broadway by Zoe Caldwell (1995), Patti LuPone (1996), Dixie Carter (1997), and Tyne Daly (2011). Caldwell won a Tony Award for her performance. Faye Dunaway starred in the 1996 national tour.
- Terrence McNally's play The Lisbon Traviata, which premiered in 1985 at the Manhattan Theatre Club, uses Maria Callas's celebrated recordings of Verdi's La traviata as a recurring point of reference in a story about friendship, romantic relationships, and opera fandom. The opening scene famously revolves around an argument over rival recordings of the opera, with her portrayal of Violetta held up as the standard against which other interpretations are judged.
- In 1997, she was featured as one of 18 significant historical figures in Apple Inc.'s Think different advertisement.
- BBC Documentary 1998: Opera; Interviews; Documentary television programs.
- In 2002, Franco Zeffirelli produced and directed a biopic, Callas Forever. It was a fictionalized film in which Callas was played by Fanny Ardant. It depicted the last months of Callas's life, when she was seduced into the making of a movie of Carmen, lip-synching to her 1964 recording of that opera.
- In 2007, Callas was posthumously awarded the Grammy Lifetime Achievement Award. In the same year, she was voted the greatest soprano of all time by BBC Music Magazine.
- The 30th anniversary of the death of Maria Callas was selected as the main motif for a high value euro collectors' coin: the €10 Greek Maria Callas commemorative coin, minted in 2007. Her image is shown in the obverse of the coin, and on the reverse the National Emblem of Greece with her signature is depicted.
- On December 2, 2008, on the 85th anniversary of Callas's birth, a group of Greek and Italian officials unveiled a plaque in her honor at Flower Hospital (now the Terence Cardinal Cooke Health Care Center) where she was born. Made of Carrara marble and engraved in Italy, the plaque reads, "Maria Callas was born in this hospital on December 2, 1923. These halls heard for the first time the musical notes of her voice, a voice which has conquered the world. To this great interpreter of universal language of music, with gratitude."
- In 2012, Callas was voted into Gramophone magazine's Hall of Fame.
- Asteroid 29834 Mariacallas was named in her memory. The official naming citation was published by the Minor Planet Center on January 31, 2018 (M.P.C. 108697).
- In 2017, two books by Tom Volf were released: Maria by Callas, punctuated with quotes in English and photos, and Callas Confidential. He also set up an exhibition entitled Maria by Callas held at La Seine Musicale in Boulogne-Billancourt from September 16 to December 14, 2017. Also in 2017, the documentary directed by Volf Maria by Callas was released, which depicts Callas's life and work in her own words by using her interviews, letters, and performances to tell her story.
- Several non-operatic singers including Anna Calvi, Linda Ronstadt, and Patti Smith have mentioned Callas as a great musical influence. Opera-turned-pop singer Giselle Bellas cites Callas as an influence; the song "The Canary" from Bellas's debut album Not Ready to Grow Up was inspired by the relationship between Callas and Onassis. Other popular musicians have paid tribute to Callas in their music:
- Enigma released the instrumental "Callas Went Away" using samples of Callas's voice, on their 1990 album MCMXC a.D.
- "La diva", on Celine Dion's 2007 French language album D'elles is about Maria Callas. The track samples the 1956 recording of La bohème.
- In the 2018–2019 season, BASE Hologram Productions presented Callas in Concert in the United States, Puerto Rico, Mexico, and Europe.
- In 2019, Volf's book Maria Callas: Lettres & Mémoires (Maria Callas: Letters & Memoirs) was released, based on letters and autobiographical essays left by the singer.
- Monica Bellucci played Callas for an evocation telling the singer's story through her own letters and words in a theater show directed by Volf, Maria Callas' Letters and Memoirs, which began at the end of November 2019 at the Théâtre Marigny in Paris, continuing throughout Europe, including the Odeon of Herodes Atticus, and ending in Los Angeles and New York City in January 2023 at the Beacon Theatre. In the play, Bellucci wore two Yves Saint Laurent dresses that had belonged to Callas.
- In 2021, the first annual Maria Callas Monaco Gala & Award, organized under the High Patronage of HSH Albert II, Prince of Monaco, was held at the Hôtel de Paris in Monte Carlo.
- In October 2021, a 1.8-metre-tall (5.9 ft) statue of Callas at the base of the Acropolis in Athens, created by Aphrodite Liti, was "ridiculed in cartoons and generated a social media storm".
- In November 2021, Spanish actress Mabel del Pozo played Maria Callas in the successful play Maria Callas, sfogato, written by Pedro Víllora.
- In 2024, American actress Angelina Jolie portrayed Callas in the biopic, Maria, directed by Pablo Larraín, which shows Callas in the 1970s during her decline. The film premiered at the 81st Venice International Film Festival where Jolie received a "rapturous" eight-minute standing ovation towards the end of the screening.
- In June 2024, Callas was inducted posthumously into the Women Songwriters Hall of Fame.
- In 2025, the European Central Bank announced that Callas had been selected to appear on the obverse of 5 euro banknotes in a future redesign, were the theme "European culture" to be selected over "Rivers and birds".
- In the 2014 film "Grace of Monaco", Callas is played by actress Paz Vega.

== Repertoire ==
Callas's stage repertoire included the following roles:

Date (debut)	Composer	Opera	Role(s)	Location	Notes
1942-04-22	Eugen d'Albert	Tiefland (in Greek)	Marta	Olympia Theatre, Athens	
1944-08-14	Ludwig van Beethoven	Fidelio (in Greek)	Leonore	Odeon of Herodes Atticus, Athens	
1948-11-30	Vincenzo Bellini	Norma	Norma	Teatro Comunale Florence	
1958-05-19	Vincenzo Bellini	Il pirata	Imogene	Teatro alla Scala, Milan	
1949-01-19	Vincenzo Bellini	I puritani	Elvira	La Fenice, Venice	
1955-03-05	Vincenzo Bellini	La sonnambula	Amina	Teatro alla Scala, Milan	
1964-07-05	Georges Bizet	Carmen	Carmen	Salle Wagram, Paris	Recording EMI
1954-07-15	Arrigo Boito	Mefistofele	Margherita	Verona Arena	
1953-05-07	Luigi Cherubini	Medea	Medea	Teatro Comunale Florence	
1957-04-14	Gaetano Donizetti	Anna Bolena	Anna Bolena	Teatro alla Scala, Milan	
1952-06-10	Gaetano Donizetti	Lucia di Lammermoor	Lucia di Lammermoor	Palacio de Bellas Artes, Mexico City	
1960-12-07	Gaetano Donizetti	Poliuto	Paolina	Teatro alla Scala, Milan	
1955-01-08	Umberto Giordano	Andrea Chénier	Maddalena di Coigny	Teatro alla Scala, Milan	
1956-05-21	Umberto Giordano	Fedora	Fedora	Teatro alla Scala, Milan	
1954-04-04	Christoph Willibald Gluck	Alceste	Alceste	Teatro alla Scala, Milan	
1957-06-01	Christoph Willibald Gluck	Iphigénie en Tauride	Iphigénie	Teatro alla Scala, Milan	
1951-06-09	Joseph Haydn	Orfeo ed Euridice	Euridice	Teatro della Pergola, Florence	
1943-02-19	Manolis Kalomiris	O Protomastoras	Singer in the intermezzo	Odeon of Herodes Atticus, Athens	
1944-07-30	Manolis Kalomiris	O Protomastoras	Smarágda	Odeon of Herodes Atticus, Athens	
1954-06-12	Ruggero Leoncavallo	Pagliacci	Nedda	Teatro alla Scala, Milan	Recording EMI
1939-04-02	Pietro Mascagni	Cavalleria rusticana	Santuzza	Olympia Theatre, Athens	
1945-09-05	Carl Millöcker	Der Bettelstudent (in Greek)	Laura	Alexandras Avenue Theater, Athens	
1952-04-02	Wolfgang Amadeus Mozart	Die Entführung aus dem Serail (in Italian)	Konstanze	Teatro alla Scala, Milan	
1947-08-02	Amilcare Ponchielli	La Gioconda	La Gioconda	Verona Arena	
1955-11-11	Giacomo Puccini	Madama Butterfly	Cio-cio-san	Civic Opera House, Chicago	
1957-07-18	Giacomo Puccini	Manon Lescaut	Manon Lescaut	Teatro alla Scala, Milan	Recording EMI
1940-06-16	Giacomo Puccini	Suor Angelica	Suor Angelica	Athens Conservatoire	
1948-01-29	Giacomo Puccini	Turandot	Turandot	La Fenice, Venice	
1956-08-20	Giacomo Puccini	La bohème	Mimi	Teatro alla Scala, Milan	Recording EMI
1942-08-27	Giacomo Puccini	Tosca	Tosca	Olympia Theatre, Athens	
1952-04-26	Gioachino Rossini	Armida	Armida	Teatro Comunale Florence	
1956-02-16	Gioachino Rossini	Il barbiere di Siviglia	Rosina	Teatro alla Scala, Milan	
1950-10-19	Gioachino Rossini	Il turco in Italia	Donna Fiorilla	Teatro Eliseo, Rome	
1954-12-07	Gaspare Spontini	La vestale	Giulia	Teatro alla Scala, Milan	
1937-01-28	Arthur Sullivan	H.M.S. Pinafore	Ralph Rackstraw	New York P.S. 164	School presentation
1936	Arthur Sullivan	The Mikado	Unknown	New York P.S. 164	School presentation
1941-02-15	Franz von Suppé	Boccaccio (in Greek)	Beatrice	Olympia Theatre, Athens	
1948-09-18	Giuseppe Verdi	Aida	Aida	Teatro Regio (Turin)	
1954-04-12	Giuseppe Verdi	Don Carlo	Elisabetta di Valois	Teatro alla Scala, Milan	
1948-04-17	Giuseppe Verdi	La forza del destino	Leonora di Vargas	Politeama Rossetti, Trieste	
1952-12-07	Giuseppe Verdi	Macbeth	Lady Macbeth	Teatro alla Scala, Milan	
1949-12-20	Giuseppe Verdi	Nabucco	Abigaile	Teatro San Carlo, Naples	
1952-06-17	Giuseppe Verdi	Rigoletto	Gilda	Palacio de Bellas Artes, Mexico City	
1951-01-14	Giuseppe Verdi	La traviata	Violetta Valéry	Teatro Comunale Florence	
1950-06-20	Giuseppe Verdi	Il trovatore	Leonora	Palacio de Bellas Artes, Mexico City	
1951-05-26	Giuseppe Verdi	I vespri siciliani	La duchessa Elena	Teatro Comunale Florence	
1949-02-26	Richard Wagner	Parsifal (in Italian)	Kundry	Teatro dell'Opera, Rome	
1947-12-30	Richard Wagner	Tristan und Isolde (in Italian)	Isolde	La Fenice, Venice	
1949-01-08	Richard Wagner	Die Walküre (in Italian)	Brünnhilde	La Fenice, Venice	

== Notable recordings ==
All recordings are in mono unless otherwise indicated. Live performances are typically available on multiple labels. In 2014, Warner Classics (formerly EMI Classics) released the Maria Callas Remastered Edition, consisting of her complete studio recordings totaling 39 albums in a boxed set remastered at Abbey Road Studios in 24-bit/96 kHz digital sound from original master tapes.

External audio
- Callas performing Amilcare Ponchielli's opera La Gioconda with the RAI National Symphony Orchestra conducted by Antonino Votto with Fedora Barbieri, Gianni Poggi, Paolo Silveri, Giulio Neri in 1952]

- Verdi, Nabucco, conducted by Vittorio Gui, live performance, Napoli, December 20, 1949
- Verdi, Il trovatore, conducted by Guido Picco, live performance, Mexico City, June 20, 1950. In the aria "D'amor sull'ali rosee", Callas sings Verdi's original high D flat, likewise in her 1951 San Carlo performance.
- Wagner, Parsifal, live performance conducted by Vittorio Gui, RAI Rome, November 20/21, 1950 (Italian)
- Verdi, Il trovatore, live performance conducted by Tullio Serafin, Teatro San Carlo, Naples, January 27, 1951
- Verdi, Les vêpres siciliennes, live performance conducted by Erich Kleiber, Teatro Comunale Florence, May 26, 1951 (Italian)
- Verdi, Aida, conducted by Oliviero De Fabritiis, live performance, Palacio de Bellas Artes, Mexico City, July 3, 1951
- Rossini, Armida, live performance, Tullio Serafin, Teatro Comunale Florence, April 26, 1952
- Ponchielli, La Gioconda, conducted by Antonino Votto, studio recording for Cetra Records, September 1952
- Bellini, Norma, conducted by Vittorio Gui, live performance, Covent Garden, London, November 18, 1952
- Verdi, Macbeth, conducted by Victor de Sabata, live performance, La Scala, Milan, December 7, 1952
- Donizetti, Lucia di Lammermoor, conducted by Tullio Serafin, studio recording for EMI, January–February 1953
- Verdi, Il trovatore, live performance conducted by Votto, La Scala February 23, 1953
- Bellini, I puritani, conducted by Tullio Serafin, studio recording for EMI, March–April 1953
- Cherubini, Médée, live performance conducted by Vittorio Gui, Teatro Comunale, Florence, May 7, 1953 (Italian)
- Mascagni, Cavalleria rusticana, conducted by Tullio Serafin, studio recording for EMI, August 1953
- Puccini, Tosca (1953 EMI recording), conducted by Victor de Sabata, studio recording for EMI, August 1953.
- Verdi, La traviata, conducted by Gabriele Santini, studio recording for Cetra Records, September 1953
- Cherubini, Médée, conducted by Leonard Bernstein, live performance, La Scala, Milan, December 10, 1953 (Italian)
- Bellini, Norma, conducted by Tullio Serafin, studio recording for EMI, April–May 1954
- Gluck, Alceste, Carlo Maria Giulini, La Scala, Milan, April 4, 1954 (Italian)
- Leoncavallo, Pagliacci, conducted by Tullio Serafin, studio recording for EMI, June 1954
- Verdi, La forza del destino, conducted by Tullio Serafin, studio recording for EMI, August 1954
- Rossini, Il turco in Italia, conducted by Gianandrea Gavazzeni, studio recording for EMI, August–September 1954
- Puccini Arias (excerpts from Manon Lescaut, La bohème, Madama Butterfly, Suor Angelica, Gianni Schicchi, Turandot), conducted by Tullio Serafin, studio recording for EMI, September 1954
- Lyric & Coloratura Arias (excerpts from Rossini's Il barbiere di Siviglia, Verdi's I vespri siciliani, Meyerbeer's Dinorah, Boito's Mefistofele, Delibes's Lakmé, Catalani's La Wally, Giordano's Andrea Chénier, Cilea's Adriana Lecouvreur), conducted by Tullio Serafin, studio recording for EMI, September 1954
- Spontini, La vestale, conducted by Antonino Votto, live performance, La Scala, Milan, December 7, 1954 (Italian)
- Verdi, La traviata, conducted by Carlo Maria Giulini, live performance, La Scala, Milan, May 28, 1955
- Callas at La Scala (excerpts from Cherubini's Médée, Spontini's La vestale, Bellini's La sonnambula), conducted by Tullio Serafin, studio recording for EMI, June 1955
- Puccini, Madama Butterfly, conducted by Herbert von Karajan, studio recording for EMI, August 1955
- Verdi, Aida, conducted by Tullio Serafin, studio recording for EMI, August 1955
- Verdi, Rigoletto, conducted by Tullio Serafin, studio recording for EMI, September 1955
- Donizetti, Lucia di Lammermoor, conducted by Herbert von Karajan, live performance, Berlin, September 29, 1955
- Bellini, Norma, conducted by Antonino Votto, live performance, La Scala, Milan, December 7, 1955
- Verdi, Il trovatore, conducted by Herbert von Karajan, studio recording for EMI, August 1956
- Puccini, La bohème, conducted by Antonino Votto, studio recording for EMI, August–September 1956. Like her recordings of Pagliacci, Manon Lescaut and Carmen, this was her only performance of the complete opera, as she never appeared onstage in it.
- Verdi, Un ballo in maschera, conducted by Antonino Votto, studio recording for EMI, September 1956
- Rossini, Il barbiere di Siviglia, conducted by Alceo Galliera, studio recording for EMI in stereo, February 1957
- Bellini, La sonnambula, conducted by Antonino Votto, studio recording for EMI, March 1957
- Donizetti, Anna Bolena, conducted by Gianandrea Gavazzeni, live performance, La Scala, Milan, April 14, 1957
- Gluck, Iphigénie en Tauride, La Scala Milan, conducted by Nino Sanzogno, June 1, 1957 (Italian)
- Bellini, La sonnambula, conducted by Antonino Votto, live performance, Cologne, July 4, 1957
- Puccini, Turandot, conducted by Tullio Serafin, studio recording for EMI, July 1957
- Puccini, Manon Lescaut, conducted by Tullio Serafin, studio recording for EMI, July 1957.
- Cherubini, Médée, conducted by Tullio Serafin, studio recording for Ricordi in stereo, September 1957 (Italian)
- Verdi, Un ballo in maschera, conducted by Gianandrea Gavazzeni, live performance, La Scala, Milan, December 7, 1957
- Verdi, La traviata, conducted by Franco Ghione, live performance, Lisbon, March 27, 1958
- Verdi, La traviata, conducted by Nicola Rescigno, live performance, London, June 20, 1958; considered by many critics to be Callas's most notable recording of Verdi's famous opera. Music critic John Ardoin wrote that in this performance "Callas' use of her voice to expressive ends amounts to an amalgamation of the best in previous Traviatas. For even though her voice betrays her at times, her intellect and spirit have now conquered the part in a manner that outdistances all others."
- Verdi Heroines (excerpts from Nabucco, Ernani, Macbeth, Don Carlo), conducted by Nicola Rescigno, studio recording for EMI in stereo, September 1958
- Mad Scenes (excerpts from Anna Bolena, Bellini's Il pirata and Ambroise Thomas's Hamlet), conducted by Nicola Rescigno, studio recording for EMI in stereo, September 1958
- Cherubini, Médée conducted by Nicola Rescigno, live performance at the Dallas Civic Opera November 6, 1958; considered to be Callas's most notable performance of Cherubini's opera. (Italian)
- Donizetti, Lucia di Lammermoor, conducted by Tullio Serafin, studio recording for EMI in stereo, March 1959
- Ponchielli, La Gioconda, conducted by Antonino Votto, studio recording for EMI in stereo, September 1959
- Bellini, Norma, conducted by Tullio Serafin, studio recording for EMI in stereo, September 1960
- Callas à Paris (excerpts from Gluck's Orphée et Eurydice, Alceste, Thomas's Mignon, Gounod's Roméo et Juliette, Bizet's Carmen, Saint-Saëns's Samson and Delilah, Massenet's Le Cid, Charpentier's Louise), conducted by Georges Prêtre, studio recording for EMI in stereo, March–April 1961
- Callas à Paris II (excerpts from Gluck's Iphigénie en Tauride, Berlioz's La damnation de Faust, Gounod's Faust, Bizet's Les pêcheurs de perles, Massenet's Manon, Werther), conducted by Georges Prêtre, studio recording for EMI in stereo, May 1963
- Mozart, Beethoven, and Weber (excerpts from Mozart's Le nozze di Figaro, Don Giovanni, Weber's Oberon), conducted by Nicola Rescigno, studio recording for EMI in stereo, December 1963 – January 1964
- Rossini and Donizetti Arias (excerpts from Rossini's La Cenerentola, Semiramide, Guglielmo Tell, Donizetti's L'elisir d'amore, Lucrezia Borgia, La figlia del reggimento), conducted by Nicola Rescigno, studio recording for EMI in stereo, December 1963 – April 1964
- Verdi Arias (excerpts from Aroldo, Don Carlo, Otello), conducted by Nicola Rescigno, studio recording for EMI in stereo, December 1963 – April 1964
- Puccini, Tosca, conducted by Carlo Felice Cillario, live performance, London, January 24, 1964
- Bizet, Carmen, conducted by Georges Prêtre, studio recording for EMI in stereo, July 1964. It is her only performance of the role, and her only performance of the complete opera; she never appeared in it onstage. The recording used the recitatives added after Bizet's death. Callas's performance caused critic Harold C. Schonberg to speculate in his book The Glorious Ones that Callas perhaps should have sung mezzo roles instead of simply soprano ones. The album would peak at No. 87 in the US.
- Puccini, Tosca, conducted by Georges Prêtre, studio recording for EMI in stereo, December 1964.
- Verdi Arias II (excerpts from I Lombardi, Attila, Il corsaro, Il trovatore, I vespri siciliani, Un ballo in maschera, Aida), conducted by Nicola Rescigno, studio recording for EMI in stereo, January 1964 – March 1969

== Filmography ==
=== Film and television ===
Year	Title	Role	Director	Notes
1966	Adieux de Tabarin		Marcel Achard	TV movie
1968	Mona Lisa		Werner Schroeter	Short
1968	Callas Walking Lucia		Werner Schroeter	Short
1969	Medea	Medea	Pier Paolo Pasolini	Feature length movie
2019	The Beautiful Face	Herself (archival footage)	Craig Caddell	Posthumously released

== Notes and references ==
Notes

Sources

- Ardoin, John; Fitzgerald, Gerald (1974). Callas: The Art and the Life. New York: Holt, Rinehart and Winston. ISBN 978-0-03-011486-1.
- Jellinek, George (1986) [1960]. Callas: Portrait of a Prima Donna (revised ed.). New York: Dover. ISBN 978-0-486-25047-2.
- Petsalis-Diomidis, Nikolaos (2001). The unknown Callas: the Greek years. Opera biography series. Portland, Oregon: Amadeus Press. ISBN 978-1-57467-059-2.. Issue 14 of opera biography series, foreword by George Lascelles.
