= Afroditi Krassa =

British product designer and interior designer

- Born: Afroditi Krassa; 1974 (age 51–52); London, England
- Education: Central Saint Martins College of Art and Design; Royal College of Art
- Occupations: Product designer Interior designer
- Known for: Itsu, Dishoom
- Website: afroditi.com

Afroditi Krassa (born 1974) is a British product designer and interior designer and founded her own design consultancy Afroditi Krassa Ltd in 2002 in London. Krassa was educated at Central St Martins College of Art and Design and later on, the Royal College of Art, under architect Ron Arad.

== Early life ==
Afroditi Krassa was born in London, England. She was raised near Mount Olympus in Greece. At the age of 17, she returned to her birthplace to become a designer.

== Career ==
She has worked at some of the world's largest consultancies and was the first female designer to be employed by the design duo Seymour Powell. In 2002, Krassa decided to go it alone and founded Afroditi Krassa Ltd. The young designer's work was picked up by major brands such as Cassina, DKNY and design aficionados, such as Mourad Mazouz (Momo) of sketch.

In 2004 Krassa was commissioned by the entrepreneur Julian Metcalfe to design the interior and branding of sushi restaurant chain Itsu. The pioneering low fat food store rapidly grew into a chain of 19 stores in London and New York City. She was then appointed Creative Director in 2005.

Offers for the design of restaurant, office and retail establishments around the world followed soon after, as well as collaborations with various manufacturers, such as lighting for Ligne Roset and Innermost, furniture for Ernst & Young, packaging for Pret a Manger and WMF, and products for British American Tobacco and Philip Morris.

When not designing, she teaches, writes about and judges design. Her work has appeared in art and design publications worldwide and has been televised by the BBC, Channel 4, CNN and NTV. Krassa's work ranges from political campaigns to car interiors and is always characterised by intellectual rigour and formal directness.
