= Aphrodite Liti =

Greek sculptor and professor of sculpture

Aphrodite Liti (born 1953) is a Greek sculptor, and professor of sculpture at the Athens School of Fine Arts.

Liti was born in Athens in 1953. She studied at the Athens School of Fine Arts and the University of London.

Liti has been professor of sculpture at the Athens School of Fine Arts since 2000.

Her 1.8-metre-tall (5.9 ft) statue of the soprano Maria Callas, unveiled in October 2021 at the base of the Acropolis in Athens, has been "ridiculed in cartoons and generated a social media storm".
