= Aphrodite 2 =

Submarine telecommunications cable system linking Greece and Cyprus

APHRODITE-2 is a submarine telecommunications cable system in the Mediterranean Sea linking Greece and Cyprus.

It has landing points in:

- Chania, Greece
- Geroskipou/Yeroskipos, Cyprus

It has a design transmission capacity of 2 x 565 Mbit/s and a total cable length of 868 km. It started operation on 30 September 1994.

== Sources ==
- "Technical Information". Archived from the original on 2011-06-08.
