= Ferruccio Tagliavini =

Italian opera singer

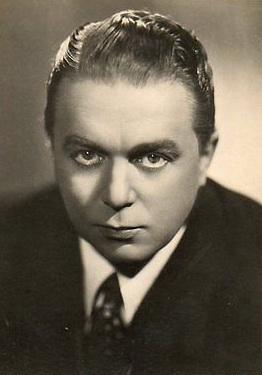
- Ferruccio Tagliavini
- Born: 14 August 1913; Reggio Emilia, Kingdom of Italy
- Died: 29 January 1995 (aged 81); Reggio Emilia, Italy
- Occupation: Operatic tenor

Ferruccio Tagliavini (pronounced [ferˈruttʃo taʎʎaˈviːni]; 14 August 1913 – 29 January 1995) was an Italian operatic lyric tenor mainly active in the 1940s and 1950s. Tagliavini was hailed as the heir apparent to Tito Schipa and Beniamino Gigli in the lyric-opera repertory due to the exceptional beauty of his voice, but he did not sustain his great early promise across the full span of his career.

== Early life and education ==
Born in Cavazzoli, Reggio Emilia on 14 August 1913, Tagliavini was the son of Erasmo and Barbara Neviani. His father was a wine merchant, and in his youth he spent much of his time caring for his maternal grandmother. He also displayed an early aptitude for singing, and at the age of 12 appeared in his first professional stage work, a children's opera pastiche, staged in Reggio Emilia on 7 November 1925. In this production, he sang the "Romanza" from Pagliacci and was cited in reviews as a highlight of the show for the quality of his voice with one reviewer comparing his singing even at this age to that of Enrico Caruso.

As a teenager, Tagliavini was active as a singer in choirs at churches in Reggio Emilia, and he also worked as a janitor at a fabric shop in the late 1920s while training to be an electric technician. During this time he also trained to be a choral singer at the Istituto Superiore di Studi Musicali "Achille Peri" di Reggio Emilia e Castelnovo ne' Monti from 1927-1934. While working as an electrician, he began training as an opera singer in the bel canto repertoire with Pietro Melloni from 1930-1934. In 1935-1936 he fulfilled his duty of compulsory military service, most of which was served in North Africa. Upon completing his service, he resumed his career as an electrician and began studies privately with Italo Brancucci, a voice teacher at the Parma Conservatory whom he studied with for several years without having to pay for lessons.

Tagliavini later studied in Florence with Amedeo Bassi, a well-known dramatic verismo and Wagnerian Italian tenor of the pre-World War I era whose voice (as recorded) could not be more unlike Tagliavini's. He began his studies with Bassi in 1938 after winning a national singing competition sponsored by the Teatro Comunale, Florence which enabled him to receive further training with Bassi as well as further specialized training in opera performance through mentorship classes at that theatre.

== Career ==
Ferruccio Tagliavini as Elvino in La sonnambula, teatro alla Scala, Milan, 1941-1943

Ferruccio Tagliavini in L'amico Fritz, teatro alla Scala, 1942-1943

Following the onset of his career in 1939, Tagliavini quickly gained recognition as one of the leading tenori di grazia of his time. In October 1939 he made his professional debut at the Teatro Comunale, Florence as Rodolfo in Giacomo Puccini's La bohème; and in the two years following his debut was heard at that opera house as Idreno in Semiramide, the Duke of Mantua in Rigoletto, and Fritz Kobus in L'amico Fritz. During this same period he appeared at La Fenice opposite Magda Olivero in Il campiello and as the Duke of Mantua; the Teatro Municipale, Reggio Emilia as Puccini's Rodolfo and as Fritz Kobus; at the Teatro dell'Opera di Roma as Federico in L'arlesiana; and as Fenton in Falstaff at the Berlin State Opera.

In 1940 Tagliavini met the soprano Pia Tassinari when starring opposite her in L'amico Fritz at the Teatro Politeama, Palermo; during which time the pair began a romance which resulted in their marriage in Rome on 30 April 1941. The pair later recorded L'amico Fritz for Ente Italiano per le Audizioni Radiofoniche in 1942. That same year, Tagliavini made his debut at La Scala as Count Almaviva in The Barber of Seville, and starred in his first film, Voglio vivere così. He went on to portray leading roles in seven more films which were commercially successful at the Italian box office; including a 1947 adaptation of The Barber of Seville with Tito Gobbi and Italo Tajo, and his final film, Vento di primavera which premiered in 1958. In 1943 he appeared at the Stadsschouwburg in Amsterdam as Rodolfo with his wife portraying Mimì.

After the end of World War II, Tagliavini made debuts at many of the world's major opera houses. They included: the Teatro Colón, Buenos Aires, in 1946; the Metropolitan Opera, New York City, in 1947 (as Rodolfo in La bohème); the San Francisco Opera in 1948; the Royal Opera House, Covent Garden, London, in 1950; and, finally, the Paris Opéra in 1951. Other operas he excelled in included L'elisir d'amore, Don Pasquale, La sonnambula, Lucia di Lammermoor, La traviata, Manon, Werther, and L'arlesiana.

During the 1950s, Tagliavini took on heavier roles such as Riccardo in Un ballo in maschera, Cavaradossi in Tosca and Faust in Mefistofele; but the lyric quality of his voice suffered as a consequence.

Tagliavini retired from the stage in 1965; he continued, however, to give occasional recitals until the mid-1970s. He left behind an impressive discography. The finest of his recordings are those that he made of operatic arias during his prime in the 1940s and early 1950s. In these records one can fully appreciate his remarkable skill at soft, or mezza voce, singing.

Tagliavini married the soprano Pia Tassinari in 1941. He made several recordings with her and they appeared together often on stage. There is a recording available of them singing Massenet's opera Werther.

He died in Reggio Emilia on 29 January 1995, aged 81.

== Studio recordings ==
Tagliavini's recordings include:

- 1939 - Mozart - Requiem, KV 626 - Ferruccio Tagliavini, Pia Tassinari, Ebe Stignani - Coro e Orchestra della Rai Torino, Victor de Sabata
- 1941 - Mascagni - L'amico Fritz - Ferruccio Tagliavini, Pia Tassinari, Saturno Meletti - Coro e Orchestra della Rai Torino, Pietro Mascagni
- 1952 - Bellini - La sonnambula - Lina Pagliughi, Ferruccio Tagliavini, Cesare Siepi - Coro Cetra, Orchestra della Rai Torino, Franco Capuana
- 1952 - Puccini - La bohème - Rosanna Carteri, Ferruccio Tagliavini, Elvina Ramella, Giuseppe Taddei, Cesare Siepi, Pier Luigi Latinucci - Coro e Orchestra della Rai Torino, Gabriele Santini
- 1954 - Puccini - Madama Butterfly - Clara Petrella, Ferruccio Tagliavini, Mafalda Masini, Giuseppe Taddei - Coro Cetra, Orchestra della Rai Torino, Angelo Questa
- 1954 - Verdi - Rigoletto - Giuseppe Taddei, Lina Pagliughi, Ferruccio Tagliavini, Giulio Neri - Coro e Orchestra della Rai Torino, Angelo Questa
- 1954 - Verdi - Un ballo in maschera - Mary Curtis Verna, Ferruccio Tagliavini, Giuseppe Valdengo, Pia Tassinari, Maria Erato - Coro e Orchestra della Rai Torino, Angelo Questa
- 1954 - Massenet - Werther - Ferruccio Tagliavini, Pia Tassinari, Vittoria Neviani, Marcello Cortis - Coro e Orchestra della Rai Torino, Francesco Molinari-Pradelli
- 1955 - Cilea - L'Arlesiana - Pia Tassinari, Ferruccio Tagliavini, Paolo Silveri, Gianna Galli - Coro e Orchestra della Rai Torino, Arturo Basile
- 1955 - Von Flotow - Martha - Elena Rizzieri, Ferruccio Tagliavini, Pia Tassinari, Carlo Tagliabue - Coro e Orchestra della Rai Torino, Francesco Molinari-Pradelli (sung in Italian)
- 1956 - Boito - Mefistofele - Giulio Neri, Ferruccio Tagliavini, Marcella Pobbé - Coro Teatro Regio Torino, Orchestra della Rai Torino, Angelo Questa
- 1956 - Puccini - Tosca - Gigliola Frazzoni, Ferruccio Tagliavini, Giangiacomo Guelfi - Coro e Orchestra della Rai Torino, Arturo Basile
- 1959 - Donizetti - Lucia di Lammermoor - Maria Callas, Ferruccio Tagliavini, Piero Cappuccilli - Philharmonia Chorus & Orchestra, Tullio Serafin

== Filmography ==
- Voglio vivere così (1941)
- La donna è mobile (1942)
- Anything for a Song (1943)
- The Barber of Seville (1947)
- Al diavolo la celebrità (1949)
- I cadetti di Guascogna (1950)
- Anema e core (1951)
- Vento di primavera (1959)

== Sources ==
=== Bibliography ===
- The Metropolitan Opera Encyclopedia, edited by David Hamilton, (Simon and Schuster, 1987). ISBN 0-671-61732-X
- Guide de l’opéra, Roland Mancini & Jean-Jacques Rouvereux, (Fayard, 1995). ISBN 2-213-59567-4
- The Concise Oxford Dictionary of Opera (Second Edition), Harold Rosenthal and John Warrack, (Oxford University Press, 1980). ISBN 0-19-311318-X
