= Marcella Pobbe =

Italian operatic soprano

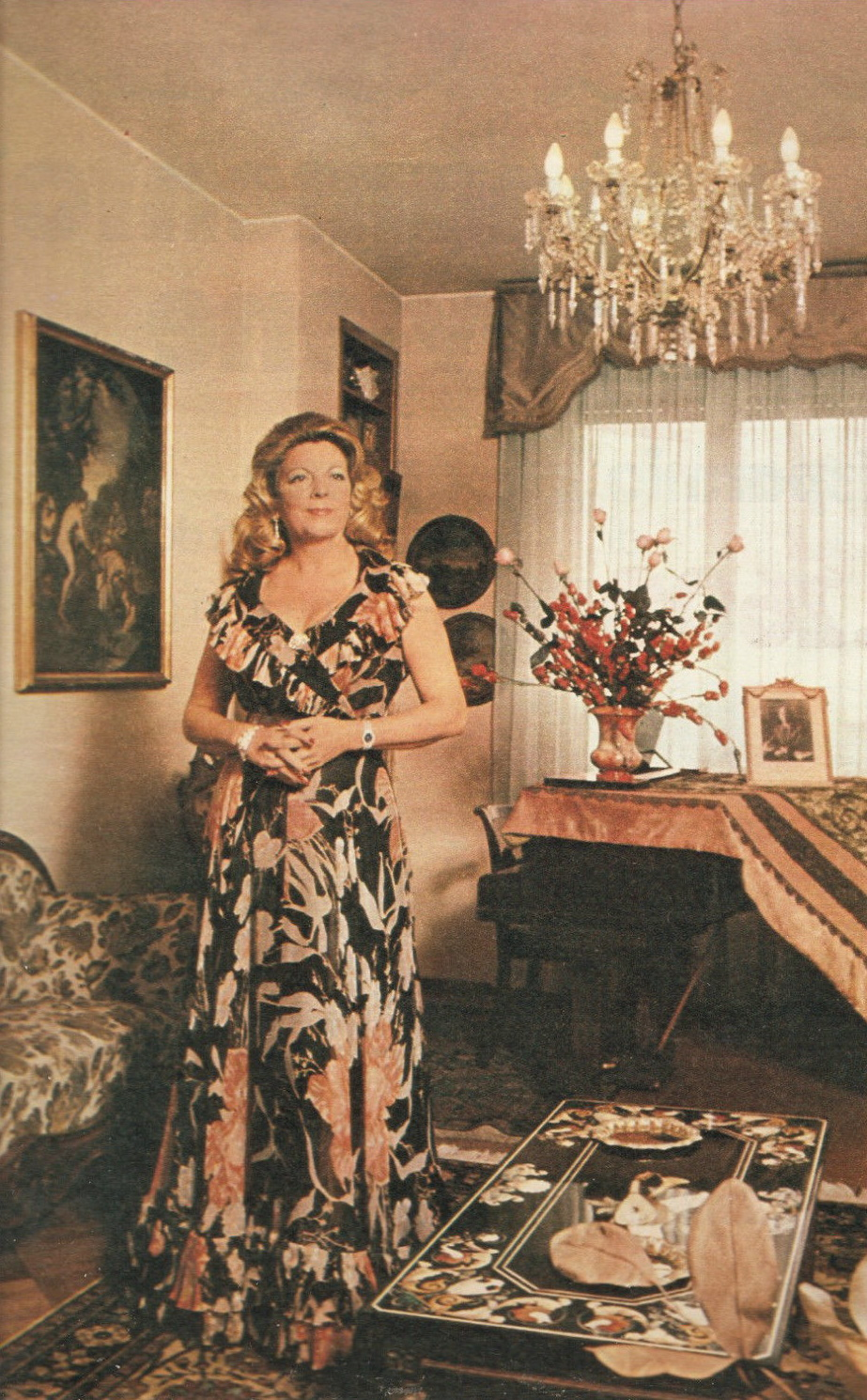
Marcella Pobbe in 1974

Marcella Pobbe (13 July 1921 – 17 June 2003) was an Italian operatic soprano who sang a wide range of roles in both the lyric and spinto repertory.

Marcella Pobbe as Bathsheba in David, Teatro alla Scala, Milan, 1955.

Pobbe was born in Montegalda near Vicenza, where she studied with Elena Fava, and later entered the Rossini Conservatory in Pesaro, where she studied with Rinalda Pavoni. She also studied at the Accademia Chigiana in Siena with Giorgio Favaretto. She made her stage debut in Spoleto, as Gounod's Marguerite, in 1949, and the same year, first appeared at the Teatro San Carlo in Naples, where she was to appear regularly until 1973.

She made her debut at the Rome Opera in 1954, in the title role of Gluck's Iphigénie en Tauride, and at La Scala in 1955, as Bathseba in the premiere of Darius Milhaud's David. She appeared at the Baths of Caracalla in 1957, as Mathilde in Guglielmo Tell, and in 1959 as Elsa in Lohengrin. She also sang at most major opera houses in Italy, Venice, Parma, Bologna, Florence, Mantua, Palermo, etc., as well as on Italian radio and television.

On the international scene, she made guest appearances at the Monte Carlo Opera, the Zurich Opera, the Vienna State Opera, the Royal Opera House in London, the Liceo in Barcelona. In North America, she sang at the Philadelphia Opera and at the Metropolitan Opera in New York, for a few performances of Marguerite and Mimi during the 1958-59 season.

Her repertory also included; Agathe, Eva, Countess Almaviva, Micaela, Leonora, Maria, Amelia, Desdemona, Maddalena, Tosca, Adriana, Francesca, etc. She can be heard on record as Margherita in Boito's Mefistofele, opposite Ferruccio Tagliavini and Giulio Neri, and in two recitals of arias, which reveal a singer with a voice of considerable beauty and refinement. For Italian television in the 1950s, she appeared in several productions, notably Le nozze di Figaro, Un ballo in maschera and Adriana Lecouvreur, one of her most celebrated roles.

Pobbe went on performing until the late 1970s, and then became a music critic for Vicenza Gazzettino. In 2000, she published a series of interviews she had made with conductors. She died in Milan.

== Sources ==
- Opera News, Obituaries, September 2003.
- Operissimo.com
