= Michèle Crider =

American opera singer (born 1959)

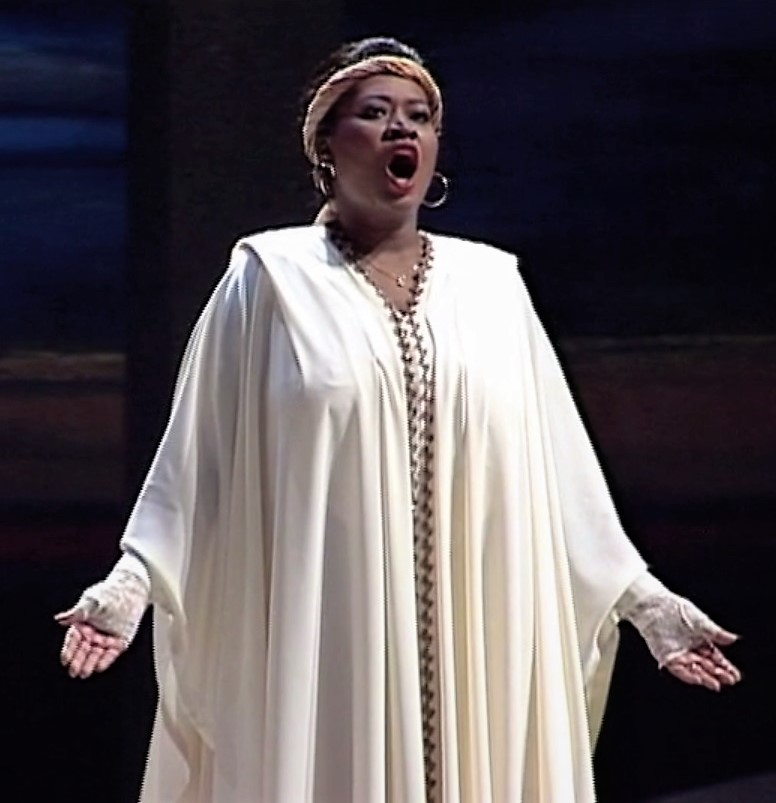
Crider at Semperoper Dresden, in Aida in 2017

Michèle Crider (born 1959 in Quincy, Illinois) is an American lirico spinto operatic soprano. She has appeared in many of the great opera house in the world including the Royal Opera House Covent Garden, the Metropolitan Opera in New York, San Francisco Opera, Los Angeles Opera and the state operas of Vienna, Munich, Berlin and Hamburg. She has sung under Riccardo Muti, Daniel Barenboim, Zubin Mehta, James Levine, Nello Santi, Christoph von Dohnányi, Semyon Bychkov, Seiji Ozawa, Riccardo Chailly and Colin Davis. She is professor of vocal performance at the Mozarteum University Salzburg.

== Background and early career ==
Crider was born in Illinois and raised in a family of 10 children. After graduating Quincy Senior High School, Crider became a first-generation college student and earned her undergraduate degree in music at Culver-Stockton College. She then went on to earn a master's degree in vocal performance at the University of Iowa, where she performed her first opera role in Madama Butterfly and came to the attention of University of Iowa alumnus Simon Estes. She won the District Metropolitan Opera Auditions twice. Afterwards she left Iowa and went to Zürich, where she continued her studies at the studio of the Zurich Opera House.

In 1988, she was the finalist of the Luciano Pavarotti competition. In 1989, she won one of the three first prizes at the Geneva International Music Competition. This prize directly led to her engagement as Leonora in Il trovatore in Dortmund and to her participation in the International Grand Prix, which she then won. Crider has recorded Amelia in Un ballo in maschera for Teldec under Carlo Rizzi, Elena and Margherita in Mefistofele under the baton of Riccardo Muti for BMG Classics, Verdi's Requiem under Richard Hickox with the London Symphony Orchestra for Chandos Records and the role of Gerhilde in Die Walküre on Decca under Christoph von Dohnanyi.

In 2018, Crider received an honorary Doctorate of Musical Arts (DMA) from University of Iowa.

== Soprano ==
Crider returned to the stage of the Metropolitan Opera in 2007 as Amelia in Un ballo in maschera, to the Vienna State Opera as Tosca, to Budapest and Mannheim as Leonora in La forza del destino, to the Aalto Theatre in Essen in the title role of Norma, made her Lisbon debut with Verdi's Messa da Requiem, was Tosca at the Deutsche Oper Berlin, the Vienna State Opera, and the Prague State Opera, was in Tel Aviv as Leonora in Il trovatore and as La gioconda, in Essen and Lecce as Aida, in Hamburg as Amelia in Un ballo in maschera, and was heard with the Jerusalem Symphony in Verdi's Messa da Requiem.

== Opera houses and performances ==
Since 1991, Crider has been heard regularly in the world's great opera houses, including the Royal Opera House Covent Garden, The Metropolitan Opera in New York, San Francisco Opera, Los Angeles Opera, the Berlin State Opera, the State Opera Houses in Vienna, Munich, Berlin, Hamburg, the Teatro alla Scala in Milan, the Arena di Verona, Rome, Zurich, Barcelona and Madrid. Crider has enjoyed a successful concert career. She has appeared at the Salzburg Festival, the Maggio Musicale Fiorentino, in Orange, Ravenna and Edinburgh, at the Royal Albert Hall London, Carnegie Hall, the Alte Oper in Frankfurt, Savonlinna, the Salle Pleyel and Barbican Hall in London with orchestras such as the London Symphony Orchestra, the London Philharmonic Orchestra, Vienna Philharmonic, National Orchestra of Paris, Berlin Philharmonic, Oslo Philharmonic, Israel Philharmonic Orchestra and the WDR Symphony Orchestra in Cologne. She has collaborated with conductors such as Riccardo Muti, Daniel Barenboim, Zubin Mehta, James Levine, Nello Santi, Christoph von Dohnanyi, Semyon Bychkov, Seiji Ozawa, Riccardo Chailly and Sir Colin Davis. From the time of her American debut in a new production of Aida in 1996 at the San Diego Opera, Crider has enjoyed a busy international schedule of engagements.

== 1997–1999 ==
In 1997, Crider debuted at the BBC Promenade concerts under Sir Colin Davis with Verdi's Messa da Requiem, followed by her first appearance with the London Philharmonic Orchestra in Beethoven's Ninth Symphony. She was invited to the Edinburgh Festival to sing Mahler's Second Symphony conducted by Mariss Jansons. In the same year she made her Japan debut in Tokyo with Verdi's Requiem under the baton of James Levine.

During the 1997/1998 season, Crider sang in a new production of Aida at the Dresden Semperoper. Three more opera house debuts took place in 1998: in July she sang in Un ballo in maschera in the Arena di Verona under the conductor Daniel Oren, followed in September by Madama Butterfly at the Bastille Opera in Paris and finally Aida at the Bavarian State Opera in Munich. The year 1998 came to an end with her return to the Vienna State Opera in December where she sang the role of Elvira in a new production of Ernani under the musical direction of Seiji Ozawa. In February 1999, she gained critical praise for her interpretation of Leonora in Verdi's Il trovatore at the New York Metropolitan Opera.

In July 1999, Crider participated in a new production of Un ballo in maschera at the Opera House in Zurich under the baton of Christoph von Dohnanyi. In November of the same year, she sang Aida at the Teatro Comunale Florence. In the following two months she performed Odabella in a new production of Attila in Geneva and in February and March she returned to the Metropolitan Opera in New York for Madama Butterfly, followed by Amelia in Un ballo in maschera at the Deutsche Oper Berlin and a new production of Aida for her debut in Amsterdam under the musical direction of Riccardo Chailly. She closed this season with a new production of Aida at the opera festival in Macerata in July 2000.

== 2000–2002 ==
Crider opened the season 2000/2001 in October with Il trovatore at the Opera House in Zurich. In December 2000, she made her Teatro Real debut in Madrid, where she sang Leonora in a new production of Verdi's Il trovatore under the musical direction of Garcia Navarro. Between January and April 2001, Crider returned to the Metropolitan Opera in New York as Amelia in Un ballo in maschera, followed by performances of the same role at the Vienna State Opera, where she also performed the role of Leonora in Il trovatore. In June 2001, she sang Aida at the San Francisco Opera House, where she was given the San Francisco Opera Award of Merit. In the summer of 2001, she debuted in Cagliari in a new production of Aida. In 2001/2002, other new productions and house debuts took place in Oviedo as Elvira in Ernani, and as Aida in Genoa and Catania, after which she returned to the Arena di Verona for the same role. Her season highlight was her critically acclaimed role debut as Norma at the Vlaamse Opera in Antwerp. During the season 2002/2003, Crider was first heard as Aida at the Metropolitan Opera in New York, followed by a highly successful house and role debut as Santuzza in a new production of Cavalleria rusticana in Trieste.

== 2003-2006 ==
In October 2003, Crider made her role debut as Tosca under the musical direction of Nello Santi at the Zurich Opera, followed by appearances as Norma in the Aalto Theatre in Essen. In January 2004, she returned to Zurich for more performances of Tosca, then moved on to the Bavarian State Opera in Munich as Aida under the musical direction of Zubin Mehta. She also sang Amelia in Un ballo in maschera in Hamburg and at the Liceu in Barcelona, closing her season at the Arena di Verona as Aida. In July 2003, Crider was awarded the Young Alumni Award by the Alumni Association of the University of Iowa.

In spring 2004, Crider celebrated an important role debut as Imogene in Bellini's Il pirata at the Vlaamse Opera. Other highlights of the season were her Carnegie Hall debut in March 2004 in Un ballo in maschera, her return to the Vienna State Opera House as Aida, and gala concerts in the Stadttheater Bremerhaven and Wiesbaden. In 2004/2005, Crider sang her signature role of Aida at the Staatsoper Berlin, followed by house debuts at La Monnaie in Brussels, the Los Angeles Opera, the Semperoper Dresden, and at the Savonlinna Festival. Further highlights of the season were performances as Tosca at the Vienna State Opera and Amelia in Un ballo in maschera and Tosca at the Zurich Opera House.

Her performances in the 2005/2006 season included Tosca for the State Opera in Berlin and the Vienna State Opera, her return to the Metropolitan Opera in New York as Aida, to the Opera House in Zurich as Tosca and to the Stadttheater St. Gallen as Norma. In February and March 2006, she returned to the Hamburg State Opera as Santuzza in Cavalleria rusticana, followed by Aida and Un ballo in maschera at the Deutsche Oper Berlin and as Madama Butterfly for the Berlin State Opera. In April 2006, she returned to the Israeli Opera as Amelia in a new production of Un ballo in maschera.

As of 2025, Crider still performs. Crider performed at the First Union Congregational Church in Quincy, IL, on November 8, 2025, as part of the Quincy Civic Music Association 2025-2026 concert season.

== Recordings ==
Her recordings include Verdi's Requiem under Richard Hickox in 1996 (Chandos) and Sir Colin Davis in 1997, Aida, Beethoven's Ninth, and Leonora in Il trovatore.
