= Falstaff (opera) =

1893 opera by Giuseppe Verdi

- Opera by Giuseppe Verdi
- Lucien Fugère in the title role, 1894
- Librettist: Arrigo Boito
- Language: Italian
- Based on: The Merry Wives of Windsor and scenes from Henry IV, Part 1 and Part 2 by William Shakespeare
- Premiere: 9 February 1893; La Scala, Milan

Falstaff (Italian pronunciation: [ˈfalstaf]) is a comic opera in three acts by the Italian composer Giuseppe Verdi. The Italian-language libretto was adapted by Arrigo Boito from the play The Merry Wives of Windsor and scenes from Henry IV, Part 1 and Part 2, by William Shakespeare. The work premiered on 9 February 1893 at La Scala, Milan.

Verdi wrote Falstaff, the last of his 26 operas, as he approached the age of 80. It was his second comedy, and his third work based on a Shakespeare play, following Macbeth and Otello. The plot revolves around the thwarted, sometimes farcical, efforts of the fat knight Sir John Falstaff to seduce two married women to gain access to their husbands' wealth.

Verdi was concerned about working on a new opera at his advanced age, but he yearned to write a comic work and was pleased with Boito's draft libretto. It took the collaborators three years from mid-1889 to complete. Although the prospect of a new opera from Verdi aroused immense interest in Italy and around the world, Falstaff did not prove to be as popular as earlier works in the composer's canon. After the initial performances in Italy, other European countries and the US, the work was neglected until the conductor Arturo Toscanini insisted on its revival at La Scala and the Metropolitan Opera in New York from the late 1890s into the next century. Some felt that the piece suffered from a lack of the full-blooded melodies of the best of Verdi's previous operas, a view that Toscanini strongly opposed. Conductors of the generation after Toscanini who championed the work included Herbert von Karajan, Georg Solti and Leonard Bernstein. The work is now part of the standard operatic repertory.

Verdi made numerous changes to the music after the first performance, and editors have found difficulty in agreeing on a definitive score. The work was first recorded in 1932 and has subsequently received many studio and live recordings. Singers closely associated with the title role have included Victor Maurel (the first Falstaff), Mariano Stabile, Giuseppe Valdengo, Tito Gobbi, Geraint Evans, Bryn Terfel and Ambrogio Maestri.

== Composition history ==
=== Conception ===
By 1889 Verdi had been an opera composer for more than fifty years. He had written 27 operas, of which only one was a comedy, his second work, Un giorno di regno, staged unsuccessfully in 1840. His fellow composer Rossini commented that he admired Verdi greatly, but thought him incapable of writing a comedy. Verdi disagreed and said that he longed to write another light-hearted opera, but nobody would give him the chance. He had included moments of comedy even in his tragic operas, for example in Un ballo in maschera and La forza del destino.

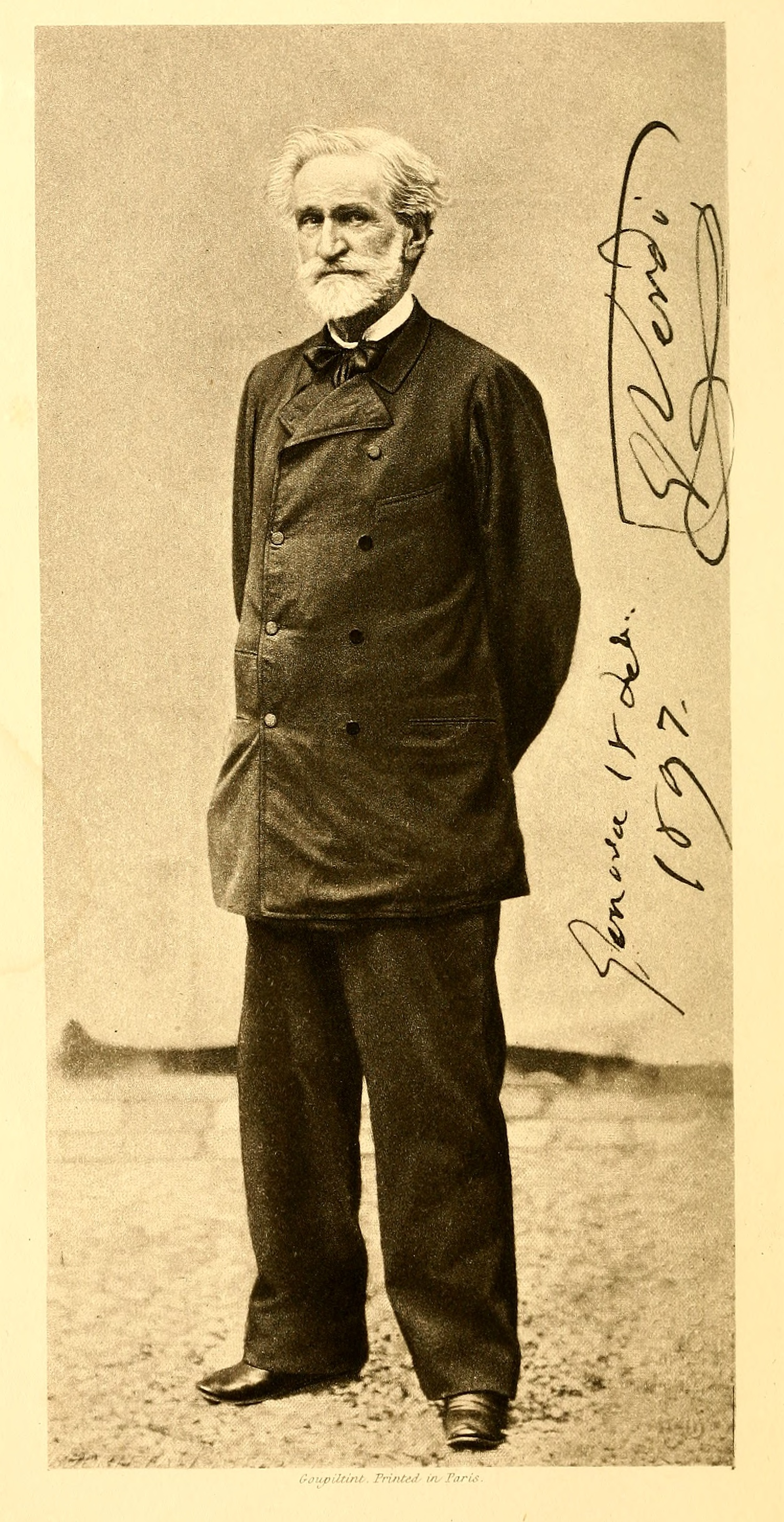
Verdi in 1897

For a comic subject Verdi considered Cervantes' Don Quixote and plays by Goldoni, Molière and Labiche, but found none of them wholly suitable. The singer Victor Maurel sent him a French libretto based on Shakespeare's The Taming of the Shrew. Verdi liked it, but replied that "to deal with it properly you need a Rossini or a Donizetti". (Note: Authorities differ on the date of Maurel's offering. Algernon St John-Brenon in The Musical Quarterly in 1916 put the date at 1886, before the premiere of Otello. Karen Henson in 19th-Century Music in 2007 quotes letters from 1890 that show Maurel's offer of the French libretto as dating from that year, while it was still a secret that Verdi was working on Falstaff.) Following the success of Otello in 1887 he commented, "After having relentlessly massacred so many heroes and heroines, I have at last the right to laugh a little." He confided his ambition to the librettist of Otello, Arrigo Boito. Boito said nothing at the time, but he secretly began work on a libretto based on The Merry Wives of Windsor with additional material taken from Henry IV, parts 1 and 2. Many composers had set the play to music, with little success, among them Carl Ditters von Dittersdorf (1796), Antonio Salieri (1799), Michael William Balfe (1835) and Adolphe Adam (1856). The first version to secure a place in the operatic repertoire was Otto Nicolai's The Merry Wives of Windsor in 1849, but its success was largely confined to German opera houses.

Boito was doubly pleased with The Merry Wives as a plot. Not only was it Shakespearian, it was based in part on Trecento Italian works – Il Pecorone by Ser Giovanni Fiorentino, and Boccaccio's Decameron. Boito adopted a deliberately archaic form of Italian to "lead Shakespeare's farce back to its clear Tuscan source", as he put it. He trimmed the plot, halved the number of characters in the play, (Note: Boito eliminated the characters Master George Page, William Page, Justice Shallow, Slender, Sir Hugh Evans, Nym, Peter Simple and John Rugby. He turned Fenton into a conventional juvenile lead, rather than Shakespeare's less romantic and more mercenary character. Mistress Quickly became simply a neighbour of the Fords and Pages, rather than Caius's servant. Subplots involving these characters were cut, including Caius's discovery of Simple in his closet (I.iv), his duel with Evans (III.i), William's Latin lesson (IV.i), and the theft of a German duke's horses (IV.v).) and gave the character of Falstaff more depth by incorporating dozens of passages from Henry IV. (Note: There is a tradition that Shakespeare wrote The Merry Wives of Windsor at the command of Elizabeth I, who expressed a wish to see "Sir John in Love". The character was familiar to Elizabethan audiences from both parts of Henry IV and there was disappointment when Shakespeare omitted him from Henry V. The Merry Wives was written in haste, and most critics in the 18th century and afterwards found the character of Falstaff crudely drawn by comparison with the more ambiguous figure in the two earlier plays. In 1744 Corbyn Morris wrote that in The Merry Wives, Falstaff is "in general greatly below his true character". In later studies of the character by Maurice Morgann (1777) and William Richardson (1789) the Falstaff of The Merry Wives is almost completely ignored. After Boito's time many critics continued to share the views of Morris and his successors; John Dover Wilson (1953) was dismissive, and W H Auden called The Merry Wives "Shakespeare's worst play". A L Rowse (1978) took a more favourable view: "It is the same old reprobate, with the same virtuosity of language in recounting his misadventures as that with which he had regaled Prince Hal.")

Verdi received the draft libretto a few weeks later, by early July 1889, at a time when his interest had been piqued by reading Shakespeare's play: "Benissimo! Benissimo! ... No one could have done better than you", he wrote back. Like Boito, Verdi loved and revered Shakespeare. The composer did not speak English, but he owned and frequently re-read Shakespeare's plays in Italian translations by Carlo Rusconi and Giulio Carcano, which he kept by his bedside. (Note: The house, near Busseto, remains in the possession of the Verdi family. The composer's rooms are preserved intact and are open to the public. Verdi's volumes of Shakespeare remain by his bedside.) He had earlier set operatic adaptations of Shakespeare's Macbeth (in 1847) and Othello (in 1887) and had considered King Lear as a subject; Boito had suggested Antony and Cleopatra.

What a joy! To be able to say to the Audience: "We are here again!! Come and see us!!"

— Verdi to Boito, 8 July 1889

Verdi still had doubts, and on the next day sent another letter to Boito expressing his concerns. He wrote of "the large number of years" in his age, his health (which he admitted was still good) and his ability to complete the project: "if I were not to finish the music?" He said that the project could all be a waste of the younger man's time and distract Boito from completing his own new opera (which became Nerone). Yet, as his biographer Mary Jane Phillips-Matz notes, "Verdi could not hide his delight at the idea of writing another opera". On 10 July 1889 he wrote again:

Amen; so be it! So let's do Falstaff! For now, let's not think of obstacles, of age, of illnesses! I also want to keep the deepest secrecy: a word that I underline three times to you that no one must know anything about it! [He notes that his wife will know about it, but assures Boito that she can keep a secret.] Anyway, if you are in the mood, then start to write.

=== Composition ===
Boito's original sketch is lost, but surviving correspondence shows that the finished opera is not greatly different from his first thoughts. The major differences were that an act 2 monologue for Ford was moved from scene 2 to scene 1, and that the last act originally ended with the marriage of the lovers rather than with the lively vocal and orchestral fugue, which was Verdi's idea. He wrote to Boito in August 1889 telling him that he was writing a fugue: "Yes, Sir! A fugue ... and a buffa fugue", which "could probably be fitted in".

Boito in 1893

Verdi accepted the need to trim Shakespeare's plot to keep the opera within an acceptable length. He was sorry, nonetheless, to see the loss of Falstaff's second humiliation, dressed up as the Wise Woman of Brentford to escape from Ford. (Note: Some editions of Shakespeare give the name as "Brainford".) He wrote of his desire to do justice to Shakespeare: "To sketch the characters in a few strokes, to weave the plot, to extract all the juice from that enormous Shakespearian orange". Shortly after the premiere an English critic, R A Streatfeild, remarked on how Verdi succeeded:

The leading note of [Falstaff]'s character is sublime self-conceit. If his belief in himself were shattered, he would be merely a vulgar sensualist and debauchee. As it is, he is a hero. For one terrible moment in the last act his self-satisfaction wavers. He looks round and sees every one laughing at him. Can it be that he has been made a fool of? But no, he puts the horrible suggestion from him, and in a flash is himself again. "Son io," he exclaims with a triumphant inspiration, "che vi fa scaltri. L'arguzia mia crea l'arguzia degli altri." ["I am not only witty in myself, but the cause that wit is in other men", a line from Henry IV part 2.] Verdi has caught this touch and indeed a hundred others throughout the opera with astonishing truth and delicacy.

In November Boito took the completed first act to Verdi at Sant'Agata, along with the second act, which was still under construction: "That act has the devil on its back; and when you touch it, it burns", Boito complained. They worked on the opera for a week, then Verdi and his wife Giuseppina Strepponi went to Genoa. No more work was done for some time.

The writer Russ McDonald observes that a letter from Boito to Verdi touches on the musical techniques used in the opera – he wrote of how to portray the characters Nannetta and Fenton: "I can't quite explain it: I would like as one sprinkles sugar on a tart to sprinkle the whole comedy with that happy love without concentrating it at any one point."

The first act was completed by March 1890; the rest of the opera was not composed in chronological order, as had been Verdi's usual practice. The musicologist Roger Parker comments that this piecemeal approach may have been "an indication of the relative independence of individual scenes". Progress was slow, with composition "carried out in short bursts of activity interspersed with long fallow periods" partly caused by the composer's depression. Verdi was weighed down by the fear of being unable to complete the score, and also by the deaths and impending deaths of close friends, including the conductors Franco Faccio and Emanuele Muzio. There was no pressure on the composer to hurry. As he observed at the time, he was not working on a commission from a particular opera house, as he had in the past, but was composing for his own pleasure: "in writing Falstaff, I haven't thought about either theatres or singers". He reiterated this idea in December 1890, a time when his spirits were very low after Muzio's death that November: "Will I finish it [Falstaff]? Or will I not finish it? Who knows! I am writing without any aim, without a goal, just to pass a few hours of the day". By early 1891 he was declaring that he could not finish the work that year, but in May he expressed some small optimism, which by mid-June, had turned into:

The Big Belly ["pancione", the name given to the opera before the composition of Falstaff became public knowledge] is on the road to madness. There are some days when he does not move, he sleeps, and is in a bad humour. At other times he shouts, runs, jumps, and tears the place apart; I let him act up a bit, but if he goes on like this, I will put him in a muzzle and straitjacket.

Victor Maurel as Iago in Boito and Verdi's Otello

Boito was overjoyed, and Verdi reported that he was still working on the opera. The two men met in October or November 1891, after which the Verdis were in Genoa for the winter. They were both taken ill there, and two months of work were lost. By mid-April 1892 the scoring of the first act was complete and by June–July Verdi was considering potential singers for roles in Falstaff. For the title role he wanted Victor Maurel, the baritone who had sung Iago in Otello, but at first the singer sought contractual terms that Verdi found unacceptable: "His demands were so outrageous, exorbitant, [and] incredible that there was nothing else to do but stop the entire project". Eventually they reached agreement and Maurel was cast. (Note: Maurel's compliance stopped short of playing the title role in the original company's tour when it played in Germany. As a Frenchman, with the German victory in the Franco-Prussian War still an offence to French national pride, he refused to perform in Germany.)

By September Verdi had agreed in a letter to his publisher Casa Ricordi that La Scala could present the premiere during the 1892–93 season, but that he would retain control over every aspect of the production. An early February date was mentioned along with the demand that the house would be available exclusively after 2 January 1893 and that, even after the dress rehearsal, he could withdraw the opera: "I will leave the theatre, and [Ricordi] will have to take the score away". The public learned of the new opera towards the end of 1892, and intense interest was aroused, increased rather than diminished by the secrecy with which Verdi surrounded the preparations; rehearsals were in private, and the press was kept at arm's length. Apart from Verdi's outrage at the way that La Scala announced the season's programme on 7 December – "either a revival of Tannhäuser or Falstaff" – things went smoothly in January 1893 up to the premiere performance on 9 February.

== Performance history ==
Verdi directing the rehearsals of Falstaff

=== Premieres ===
The first performance of Falstaff was at La Scala in Milan on 9 February 1893, nearly six years after Verdi's previous premiere. For the first night, official ticket prices were thirty times greater than usual. (Note: Reserved seats on the platea (main floor) were raised from 5 lire to 150 lire, with similar increases in other parts of the house.) Royalty, aristocracy, critics and leading figures from the arts all over Europe were present. The performance was a huge success under the baton of Edoardo Mascheroni; numbers were encored, and at the end the applause for Verdi and the cast lasted an hour. (Note: Although most of the music is through-composed, with no obvious breaks where an encore could be taken, Verdi had agreed in advance that the women's quartet "Quell'otre! quel tino!" and Falstaff's brief song "Quand'ero paggio" could be encored. Hepokoski speculates that the conductor may have slowed and then briefly stopped the music to allow the audience to applaud. At later performances Verdi allowed other sections of the score to be encored, including Nannetta's "Sul fil d'un soffio etesio".) That was followed by a tumultuous welcome when the composer, his wife and Boito arrived at the Grand Hotel de Milan.

Over the next two months the work was given twenty-two performances in Milan and then taken by the original company, led by Maurel, to Genoa, Rome, Venice, Trieste, Vienna and, without Maurel, to Berlin. Verdi and his wife left Milan on 2 March; Ricordi encouraged the composer to go to the planned Rome performance of 14 April, to maintain the momentum and excitement that the opera had generated. The Verdis, along with Boito and Giulio Ricordi, attended together with King Umberto I and other major royal and political figures of the day. The king introduced Verdi to the audience from the Royal Box to great acclaim, "a national recognition and apotheosis of Verdi that had never been tendered him before", notes Phillips-Matz.

Poster for the Paris première of 1894, by Adolfo Hohenstein.

During these early performances Verdi made substantial changes to the score. For some of these he altered his manuscript, but for others musicologists have had to rely on the numerous full and piano scores put out by Ricordi. Further changes were made for the Paris premiere in 1894, which are also inadequately documented. Ricordi attempted to keep up with the changes, issuing new edition after new edition, but the orchestral and piano scores were often mutually contradictory. The Verdi scholar James Hepokoski considers that a definitive score of the opera is impossible, leaving companies and conductors to choose between a variety of options. In a 2013 study Philip Gossett disagrees, believing that the autograph is essentially a reliable source, augmented by contemporary Ricordi editions for the few passages that Verdi omitted to amend in his own score.

The first performances outside the Kingdom of Italy were in Trieste and Vienna, in May 1893. The work was given in the Americas and across Europe. The Berlin premiere of 1893 so excited Ferruccio Busoni that he drafted a letter to Verdi, in which he addressed him as "Italy's leading composer" and "one of the noblest persons of our time", and in which he explained that "Falstaff provoked in me such a revolution of spirit that I can ... date [to the experience] the beginning of a new epoch in my artistic life." Antonio Scotti played the title role in Buenos Aires in July 1893; Gustav Mahler conducted the opera in Hamburg in January 1894; a Russian translation was presented in St Petersburg in the same month. Paris was regarded by many as the operatic capital of Europe, and for the production there in April 1894 Boito, who was fluent in French, made his own translation with the help of the Parisian poet Paul Solanges. This translation, approved by Verdi, is quite free in its rendering of Boito's original Italian text. Boito was content to delegate the English and German translations to William Beatty-Kingston and Max Kalbeck respectively. The London premiere, sung in Italian, was at Covent Garden on 19 May 1894. The conductor was Luigi Mancinelli, and Zilli and Pini Corsi repeated their original roles. Falstaff was sung by Arturo Pessina; Maurel played the role at Covent Garden the following season. On 4 February 1895 the work was first presented at the Metropolitan Opera, New York; Mancinelli conducted and the cast included Maurel as Falstaff, Emma Eames as Alice, Zélie de Lussan as Nannetta and Sofia Scalchi as Mistress Quickly.

=== Neglect ===
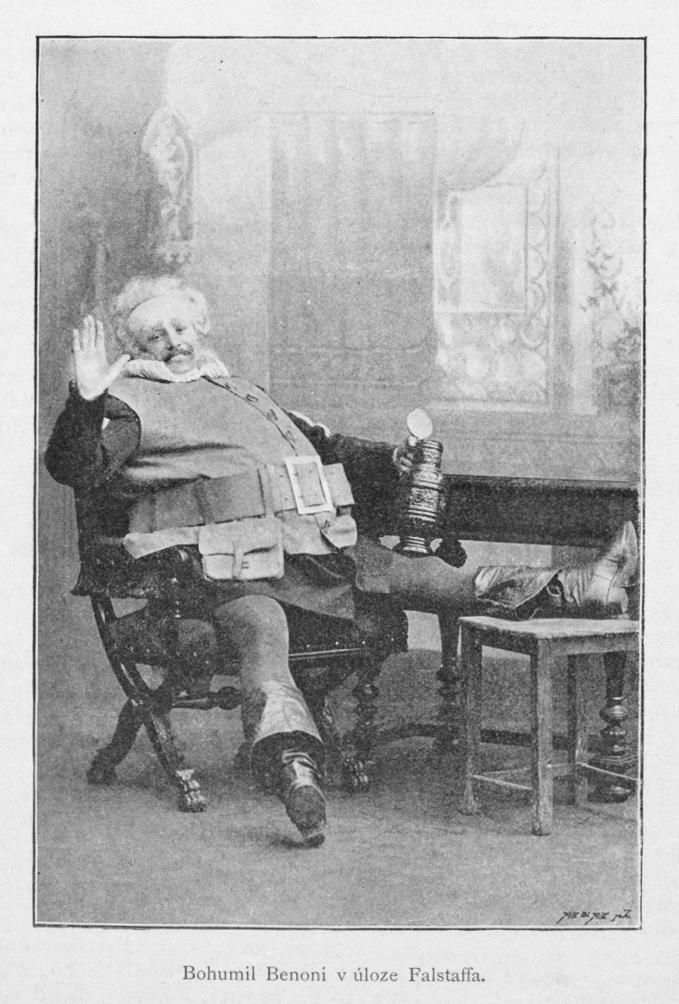
Bohumil Benoni as Falstaff, 1894

After the initial excitement, audiences quickly diminished. Operagoers were nonplussed by the absence of big traditional arias and choruses. A contemporary critic summed it up: "'Is this our Verdi?' they asked themselves. 'But where is the motive; where are the broad melodies ... where are the usual ensembles; the finales?'" By the time of Verdi's death in 1901 the work had fallen out of the international repertoire, though Gustav Mahler, an admirer of Verdi, led a production of "exceptional quality" in 1904 at the Vienna Court Opera. The rising young conductor Arturo Toscanini was a strong advocate of the work, and did much to save it from neglect. As musical director of La Scala (from 1898) and the Metropolitan Opera (from 1908), he programmed Falstaff from the start of his tenure. Richard Aldrich, music critic of The New York Times, wrote that Toscanini's revival "ought to be marked in red letters in the record of the season. Falstaff, which was first produced here on February 4, 1895, has not been given since the following season, and was heard in these two seasons only half a dozen times in all." Aldrich added that though the general public might have had difficulty with the work, "to connoisseurs it was an unending delight".

In Britain, as in continental Europe and the US, the work fell out of the repertoire. Sir Thomas Beecham revived it in 1919, and recalling in his memoirs that the public had stayed away he commented:

I have often been asked why I think Falstaff is not more of a box-office attraction, and I do not think the answer is far to seek. Let it be admitted that there are fragments of melody as exquisite and haunting as anything that Verdi has written elsewhere, such as the duet of Nanetta and Fenton in the first act and the song of Fenton at the beginning of the final scene, which have something of the lingering beauty of an Indian summer. But in comparison with every other work of the composer, it is wanting in tunes of a broad and impressive character, and one or two of the type of "O Mia Regina", "Ritorna Vincitor", or "Ora per sempre addio" might have helped the situation.

Toscanini recognised that this was the view of many, but he believed the work to be Verdi's greatest opera; he said, "I believe it will take years and years before the general public understand this masterpiece, but when they really know it they will run to hear it like they do now for Rigoletto and La traviata."

=== Re-emergence ===
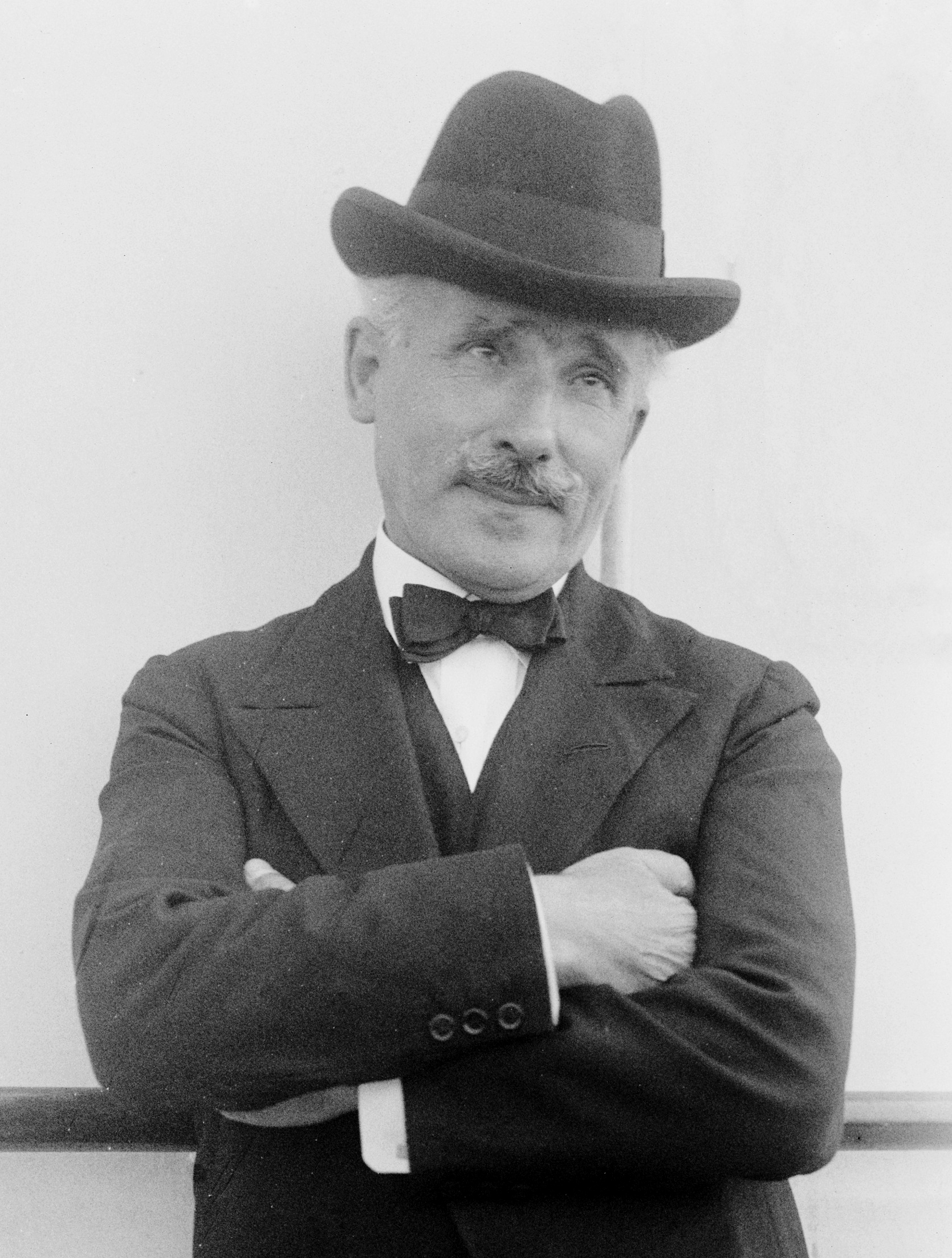
The conductor Arturo Toscanini, who strove to return Falstaff to the regular repertory

Toscanini returned to La Scala in 1921 and remained in charge there until 1929, presenting Falstaff in every season. He took the work to Germany and Austria in the late 1920s and the 1930s, conducting it in Vienna, Berlin and at three successive Salzburg Festivals. Among those inspired by Toscanini's performances were Herbert von Karajan and Georg Solti, who were among his répétiteurs at Salzburg. Toscanini's younger colleague Tullio Serafin continued to present the work in Germany and Austria after Toscanini refused to perform there because of his loathing of the Nazi regime.

When Karajan was in a position to do so he added Falstaff to the repertoire of his opera company at Aachen in 1941, and he remained a proponent of the work for the rest of his career, presenting it frequently in Vienna, Salzburg and elsewhere, and making audio and video recordings of it. Solti also became closely associated with Falstaff, as did Carlo Maria Giulini; they both conducted many performances of the work in mainland Europe, Britain and the US and made several recordings. Leonard Bernstein conducted the work at the Met and the Vienna State Opera, and on record. The advocacy of these and later conductors has given the work an assured place in the modern repertoire. (Note: Among leading conductors of later generations who have been associated with Falstaff are Claudio Abbado and Sir Colin Davis, both of whom recorded the work twice.)

Among revivals in the 1950s and later, Hepokoski singles out as particularly notable the Glyndebourne productions with Fernando Corena and later Geraint Evans in the title role; three different stagings by Franco Zeffirelli, for the Holland Festival (1956), Covent Garden (1961) and the Metropolitan Opera (1964); and Luchino Visconti's 1966 version in Vienna. A 1982 production by Ronald Eyre, more reflective and melancholy than usual, was staged in Los Angeles, London and Florence; Renato Bruson was Falstaff and Giulini conducted. Among more recent players of the title role Bryn Terfel has taken the part at Covent Garden in 1999, in a production by Graham Vick, conducted by Bernard Haitink. and at the Metropolitan Opera in a revival of the Zeffirelli production, conducted by James Levine in 2006.

Although Falstaff has become a regular repertoire work there nonetheless remains a view expressed by John von Rhein in the Chicago Tribune in 1985: "Falstaff probably always will fall into the category of 'connoisseur's opera' rather than taking its place as a popular favorite on the order of La traviata or Aida."

== Roles ==
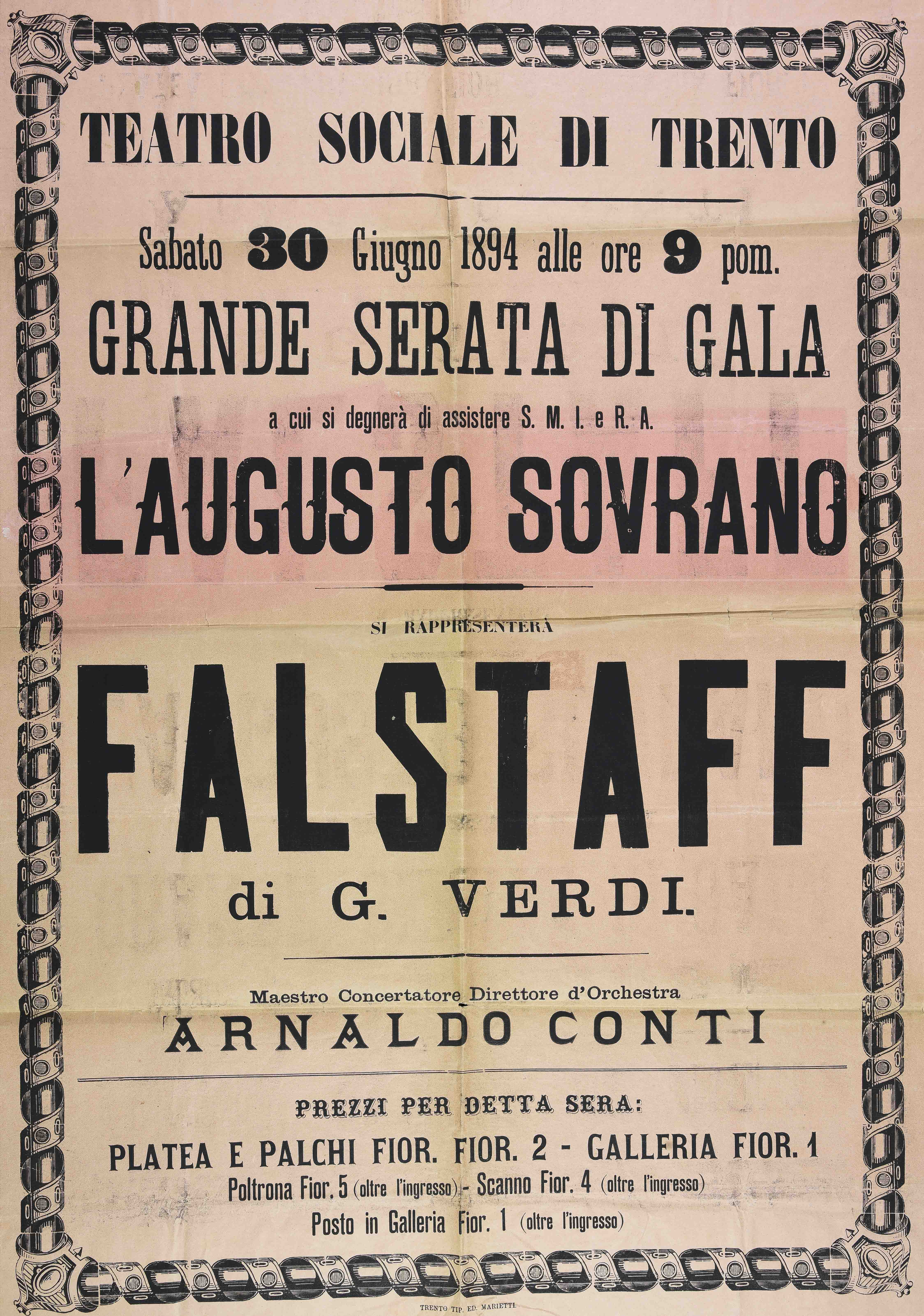
"Falstaff" in a theatre playbill, preserved in the Municipal Library of Trento

Roles, voice types, premiere cast
Role	Voice type	Premiere cast, 9 February 1893 Conductor: Edoardo Mascheroni
Sir John Falstaff, a fat knight	bass-baritone	Victor Maurel
Ford, a wealthy man	baritone	Antonio Pini-Corsi
Alice Ford, his wife	soprano	Emma Zilli
Nannetta, their daughter	soprano	Adelina Stehle
Meg Page	mezzo-soprano	Virginia Guerrini
Mistress Quickly	contralto	Giuseppina Pasqua
Fenton, one of Nannetta's suitors	tenor	Edoardo Garbin
Dr Caius	tenor	Giovanni Paroli
Bardolfo, a follower of Falstaff	tenor	Paolo Pelagalli-Rossetti
Pistola, a follower of Falstaff	bass	Vittorio Arimondi
Mine Host of the Garter Inn	silent	Attilio Pulcini
Robin, Falstaff's page	silent	
Chorus of townspeople, Ford's servants, and masqueraders dressed as fairies etc.

== Synopsis ==
Time: The reign of Henry IV, 1399 to 1413

Place: Windsor, England

=== Act 1 ===
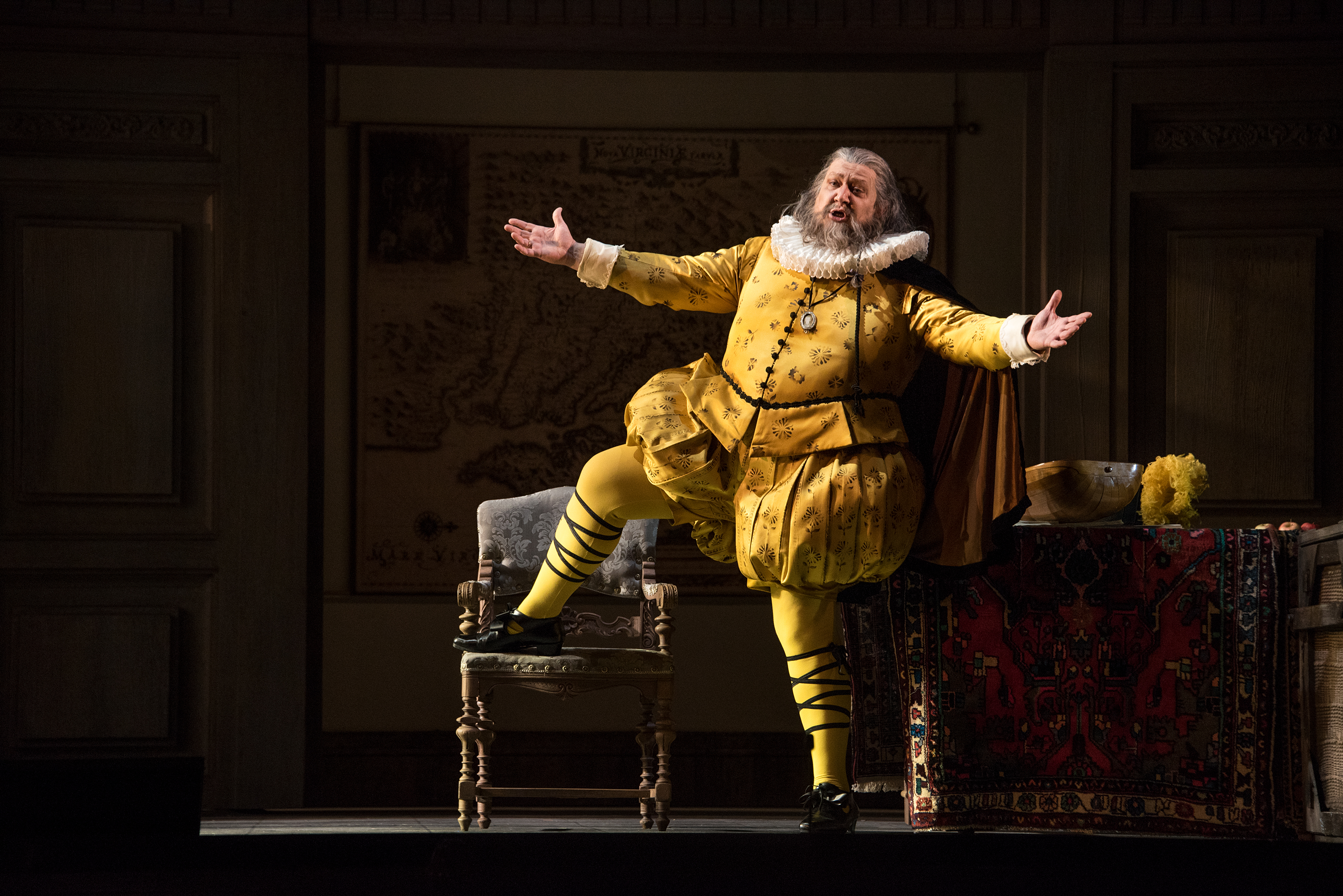
Ambrogio Maestri as Falstaff in the 2016 Vienna State Opera production, directed by David McVicar, conducted by Zubin Mehta.

A room at the Garter Inn

Falstaff and his servants, Bardolfo and Pistola, are drinking at the inn. Dr Caius bursts in and accuses Falstaff of burgling his house and Bardolfo of picking his pocket. Falstaff laughs at him; he leaves, vowing only to go drinking with honest, sober companions in future. When the innkeeper presents a bill for the wine, Falstaff tells Bardolfo and Pistola that he needs more money, and plans to obtain it by seducing the wives of two rich men, one of whom is Ford. Falstaff hands Bardolfo a love-letter to one of the wives (Alice Ford), and hands Pistola an identical letter addressed to the other (Meg). Bardolfo and Pistola refuse to deliver the letters, claiming that honour prevents them from obeying him. Falstaff loses his temper and rants at them, saying that "honour" is nothing but a word, with no meaning (Monologue: "L'onore! Ladri ... !" / "Honour! You rogues ... !") Brandishing a broom, he chases them out of his sight.

Ford's garden

Alice and Meg have received Falstaff's letters. They compare them, see that they are identical and, together with Mistress Quickly and Nannetta Ford, resolve to punish Falstaff. Meanwhile, Bardolfo and Pistola warn Ford of Falstaff's plan. Ford resolves to disguise himself and visit Falstaff and set a trap for him.

A young, handsome fellow called Fenton is in love with Ford's daughter Nannetta, but Ford wants her to marry Dr. Caius, who is wealthy and respected. Fenton and Nannetta enjoy a moment of privacy, but are interrupted by the return of Alice, Meg and Mistress Quickly. The act ends with an ensemble in which the women and the men separately plan revenge on Falstaff, the women gleefully anticipating an enjoyable prank, while the men angrily mutter dire threats.

=== Act 2 ===
A room at the Garter Inn

Falstaff is alone at the inn. Bardolfo and Pistola, now in the pay of Ford, enter and beg Falstaff to allow them to re-enter his service, secretly planning to spy on him for Ford. Mistress Quickly enters and tells him that Alice is in love with him and will be alone in Ford's home that afternoon, from two o'clock until three o'clock, just time for an amorous dalliance. Falstaff celebrates his potential success ("Va, vecchio John" / "Go, old Jack, go your own way").

Ford arrives, masquerading as a wealthy stranger, using the false name "Signor Fontana". He tells Falstaff that he is in love with Alice, but she is too virtuous to entertain him. He offers to pay Falstaff to use his impressive title and (alleged) charms to seduce her away from her virtuous convictions, after which he ("Fontana") might have a better chance of seducing her himself. Falstaff, delighted at the prospect of being paid to seduce the wealthy and beautiful woman, agrees, and reveals that he already has a rendezvous arranged with Alice for two o'clock – the hour when Ford is always absent from home. Ford is consumed with jealousy, but conceals his feelings. Falstaff withdraws to a private room to change into his finest clothes, and Ford, left alone, reflects on the evil of an uncertain marriage and vows to have revenge ("È sogno o realtà?" / "Is it a dream or reality?"). When Falstaff returns in his finery, they leave together with elaborate displays of mutual courtesy.

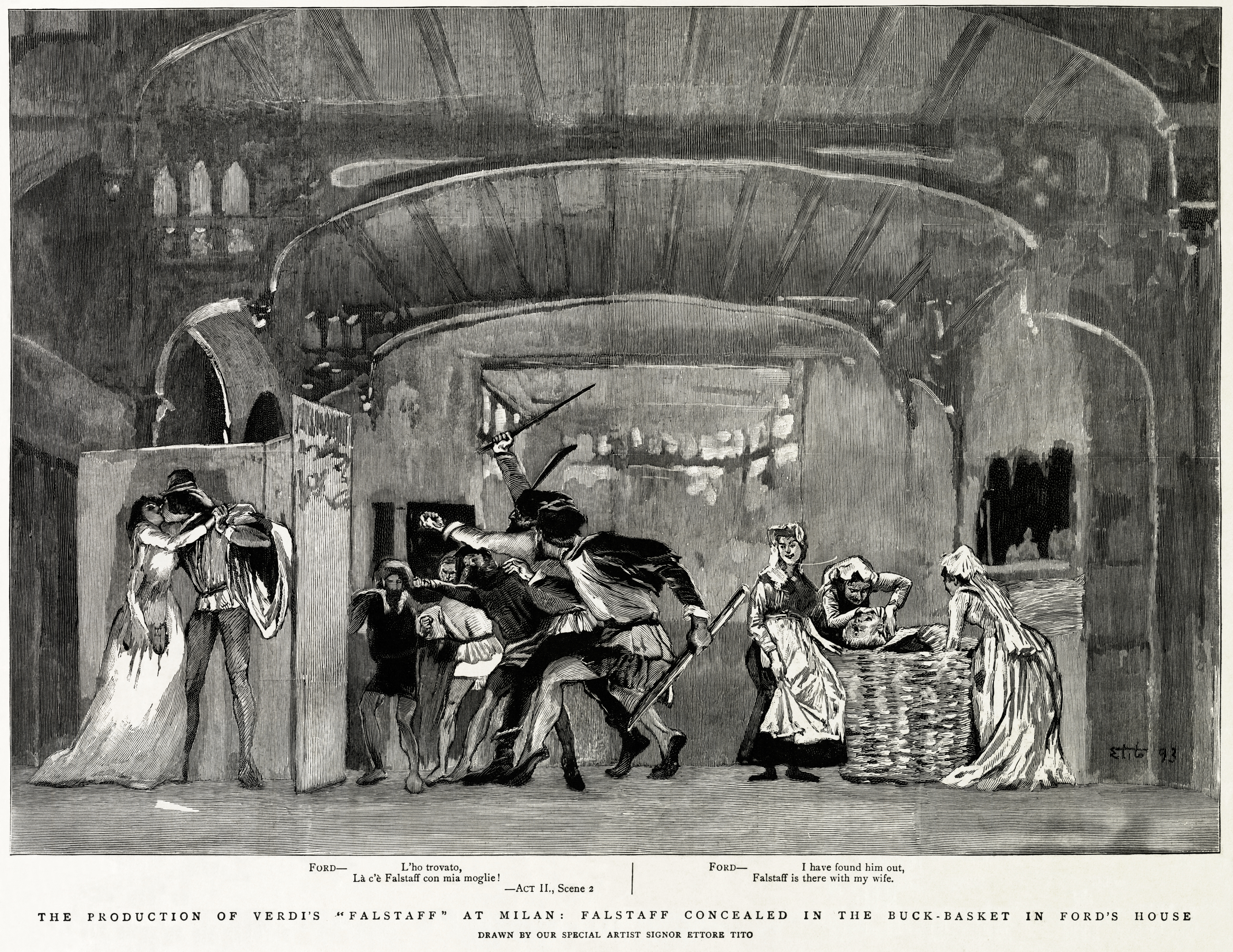
Engraving by Ettore Tito of act 2, scene 2, from the original production. Ford and the servants creep towards Fenton and Nannetta, who they think are Falstaff and Alice, behind the screen, while the women stifle Falstaff in the laundry basket.

A room in Ford's house

The three women plot their strategy ("Gaie Comari di Windsor" / "Merry wives of Windsor, the time has come!"). Alice notices that Nannetta is too unhappy and anxious to share their gleeful anticipation. This is because Ford plans to marry her to Dr Caius, a man old enough to be her grandfather; the women reassure her that they will prevent it. Mistress Quickly announces Falstaff's arrival, and Mistress Ford has a large laundry basket and a screen placed in readiness. Falstaff attempts to seduce Alice with tales of his past youth and glory ("Quand'ero paggio del Duca di Norfolk" / "When I was page to the Duke of Norfolk I was slender"). Mistress Quickly rushes in, shouting that Ford has returned home unexpectedly with a retinue of henchmen to catch his wife's lover. Falstaff hides first behind the screen, but realizes that Ford will likely look for him there. The women urge him to hide in the laundry basket, which he does. In the meantime Fenton and Nannetta hide behind the screen for another moment of privacy. Ford and his men storm in and search for Falstaff, and hear the sound of Fenton and Nannetta kissing behind the screen. They assume it is Falstaff with Alice, but instead they find the young lovers. Ford orders Fenton to leave. Badly cramped and almost suffocating in the laundry hamper, Falstaff moans with discomfort while the men resume the search of the house. Alice orders her servants to throw the laundry basket through the window into the River Thames, where Falstaff endures the jeers of the crowd. Ford, seeing that Alice had never intended to betray him, smiles happily.

=== Act 3 ===
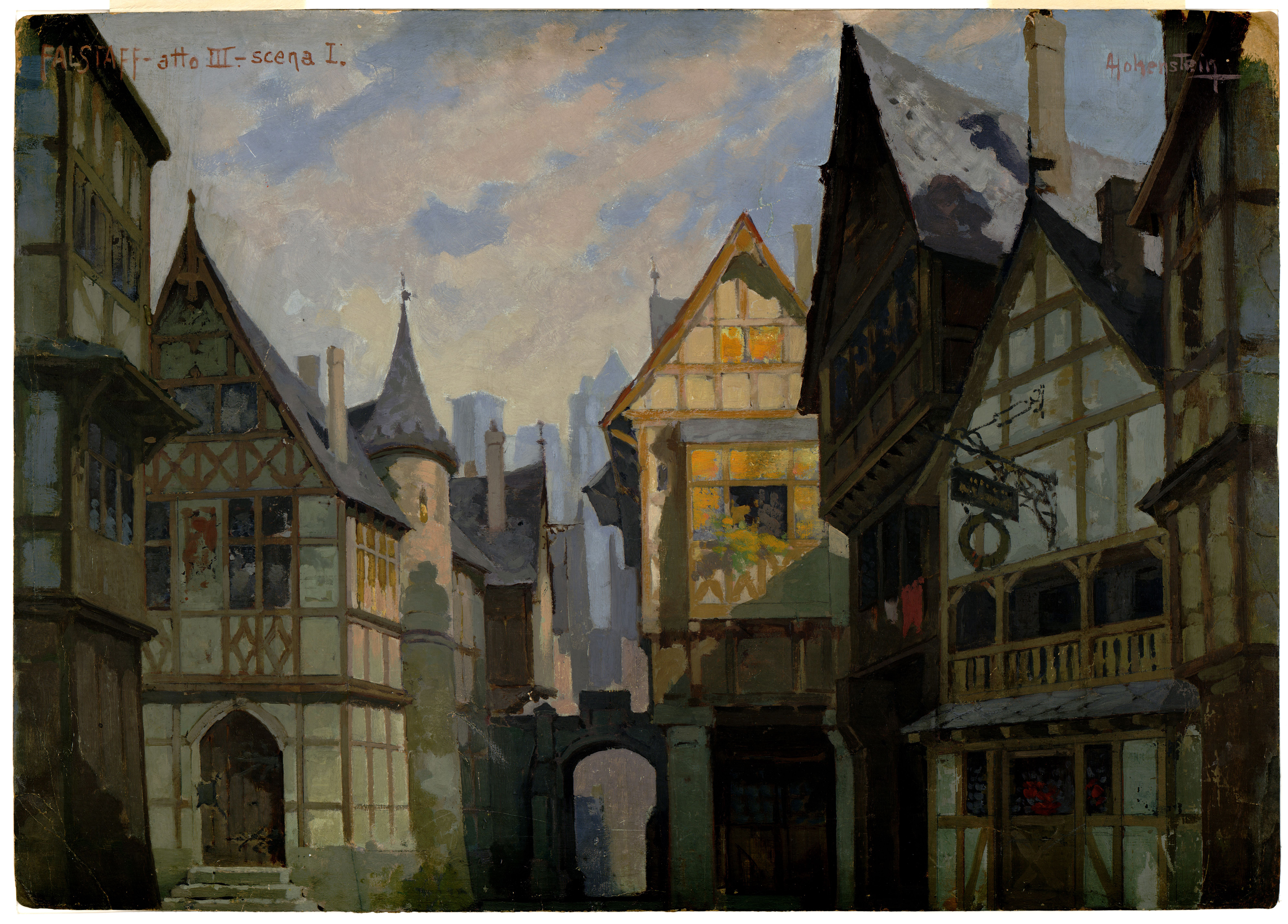
Un piazzale, a destra l'esterno dell'Osteria della Giarrettiera, set design for Falstaff act 3 scene 1 (1893).

Before the inn

Falstaff, cold and discouraged, glumly curses the sorry state of the world. Some mulled wine soon improves his mood. Mistress Quickly arrives and delivers another invitation to meet Alice. Falstaff at first wants nothing to do with it, but she persuades him. He is to meet Alice at midnight at Herne's Oak in Windsor Great Park dressed up as the ghost of Herne the Hunter who, according to local superstition, haunts the area near the tree, and appears there at midnight with a band of supernatural spirits. He and Mistress Quickly go inside the inn. Ford has realized his error in suspecting his wife, and they and their allies have been watching secretly. They now concoct a plan for Falstaff's punishment: dressed as supernatural creatures, they will ambush and torment him at midnight. Ford draws Dr. Caius aside and privately proposes a separate plot to marry him to Nannetta: Nannetta will be disguised as Queen of the Fairies, Caius will wear a monk's costume, and Ford will join the two of them with a nuptial blessing. Mistress Quickly overhears and quietly vows to thwart Ford's scheme.

Herne's Oak in Windsor Park on a moonlit midnight

Fenton arrives at the oak tree and sings of his happiness ("Dal labbro il canto estasiato vola" / "From my lips, a song of ecstasy flies") ending with "Lips that are kissed lose none of their allure." Nannetta enters to finish the line with "Indeed, they renew it, like the moon." The women arrive and disguise Fenton as a monk, telling him that they have arranged to spoil Ford's and Caius's plans. Nannetta, as the Fairy Queen, instructs her helpers ("Sul fil d'un soffio etesio" / "On the breath of a fragrant breeze, fly, nimble spirits") before all the characters arrive on the scene. Falstaff's attempted love scene with Alice is interrupted by the announcement that witches are approaching, and the men, disguised as elves and fairies, soundly thrash Falstaff. In the middle of the beating, he recognizes Bardolfo in disguise. The joke is over, and Falstaff acknowledges that he has received his due. Ford announces that a wedding will ensue. Caius and the Queen of the Fairies enter. A second couple, also in masquerade, ask Ford to deliver the same blessing for them as well. Ford conducts the double ceremony. Caius finds that instead of Nannetta, his bride is the disguised Bardolfo, and Ford has unwittingly blessed the marriage of Fenton and Nannetta. Ford accepts the fait accompli with good grace. Falstaff, pleased to find himself not the only dupe, proclaims that all the world is folly, and all are figures of fun ("Tutto nel mondo è burla ... Tutti gabbati!...Ma ride ben chi ride La risata final." / "Everything in the world is a jest ... but he laughs well who laughs the final laugh"). The entire company repeats his proclamation in an exuberant ten-voice fugue.

== Music and drama ==
Verdi scored Falstaff for three flutes (third doubling piccolo), two oboes, English horn, two clarinets, bass clarinet, two bassoons, four horns, three trumpets, three trombones, cimbasso, timpani, percussion (triangle, cymbals, bass drum), harp, and strings. In addition, a guitar, natural horn, and bell are heard from offstage. Unlike most of Verdi's earlier operatic scores, Falstaff is through-composed. No list of numbers is printed in the published full score. The score differs from much of Verdi's earlier work by having no overture: there are seven bars for the orchestra before the first voice (Dr Caius) enters. The critic Rodney Milnes comments that "enjoyment ... shines from every bar in its irresistible forward impulse, its effortless melody, its rhythmic vitality, and sureness of dramatic pace and construction." In The New Grove Dictionary of Opera, Roger Parker writes that:

the listener is bombarded by a stunning diversity of rhythms, orchestral textures, melodic motifs and harmonic devices. Passages that in earlier times would have furnished material for an entire number here crowd in on each other, shouldering themselves unceremoniously to the fore in bewildering succession.

First edition cover

The opera was described by its creators as a commedia lirica. (Note: Although the term translates literally into English as "lyric comedy", Leoncavallo used it for his version of La bohème (1897), which ends tragically, and Puccini used the term for his bittersweet La rondine (1917).) McDonald commented in 2009 that Falstaff is very different – a stylistic departure – from Verdi's earlier work. In McDonald's view most of the musical expression is in the dialogue, and there is only one traditional aria. The result is that "such stylistic economy – more sophisticated, more challenging than he had employed before – is the keynote of the work." McDonald argues that consciously or unconsciously, Verdi was developing the idiom that would come to dominate the music of the 20th century: "the lyricism is abbreviated, glanced at rather than indulged. Melodies bloom suddenly and then vanish, replaced by contrasting tempo or an unexpected phrase that introduces another character or idea". In McDonald's view the orchestral writing acts as a sophisticated commentator on the action. It has influenced at least one of Verdi's operatic successors: in 1952 Imogen Holst, musical assistant to Benjamin Britten, wrote, after a performance of Falstaff, "I realised for the first time how much Ben owes to [Verdi]. There are orchestral bits which are just as funny to listen to as the comic instrumental bits in A. Herring!"

The extent to which Falstaff is a "Shakespearian" opera has often been debated by critics. Although the action is taken from The Merry Wives of Windsor, some commentators feel that Boito and Verdi have transmuted Shakespeare's play into a wholly Italian work. The soprano Elisabeth Schwarzkopf believed there was nothing English or Shakespearian about the comedy: "it was all done through the music". In 1961 Peter Heyworth wrote in The Observer, "Because of Shakespeare we like to think of Falstaff as a work that has a certain Englishness. In fact the opera is no more English than Aida is Egyptian. Boito and Verdi between them transformed the fat knight into one of the archetypes of opera buffa." Verdi himself, however, felt that the Falstaff of the opera is not a conventional Italian buffo character, but portrays Shakespeare's fuller, more ambiguous Falstaff of the Henry IV plays: "My Falstaff is not merely the hero of The Merry Wives of Windsor, who is simply a buffoon, and allows himself to be tricked by the women, but also the Falstaff of the two parts of Henry IV. Boito has written the libretto in accordance." A contemporary critic argued that the text "imitated with marvellous accuracy the metre and rhythm of Shakespeare's verse", but Hepokoski notes Boito's use of traditional Italian metric conventions. (Note: Thus, the young lovers generally sing to one another in quinari (five-syllable lines), the merry wives do their plotting in senari (six-syllable lines) and Ford and his cohorts are given ottonari (eight-syllable lines).)

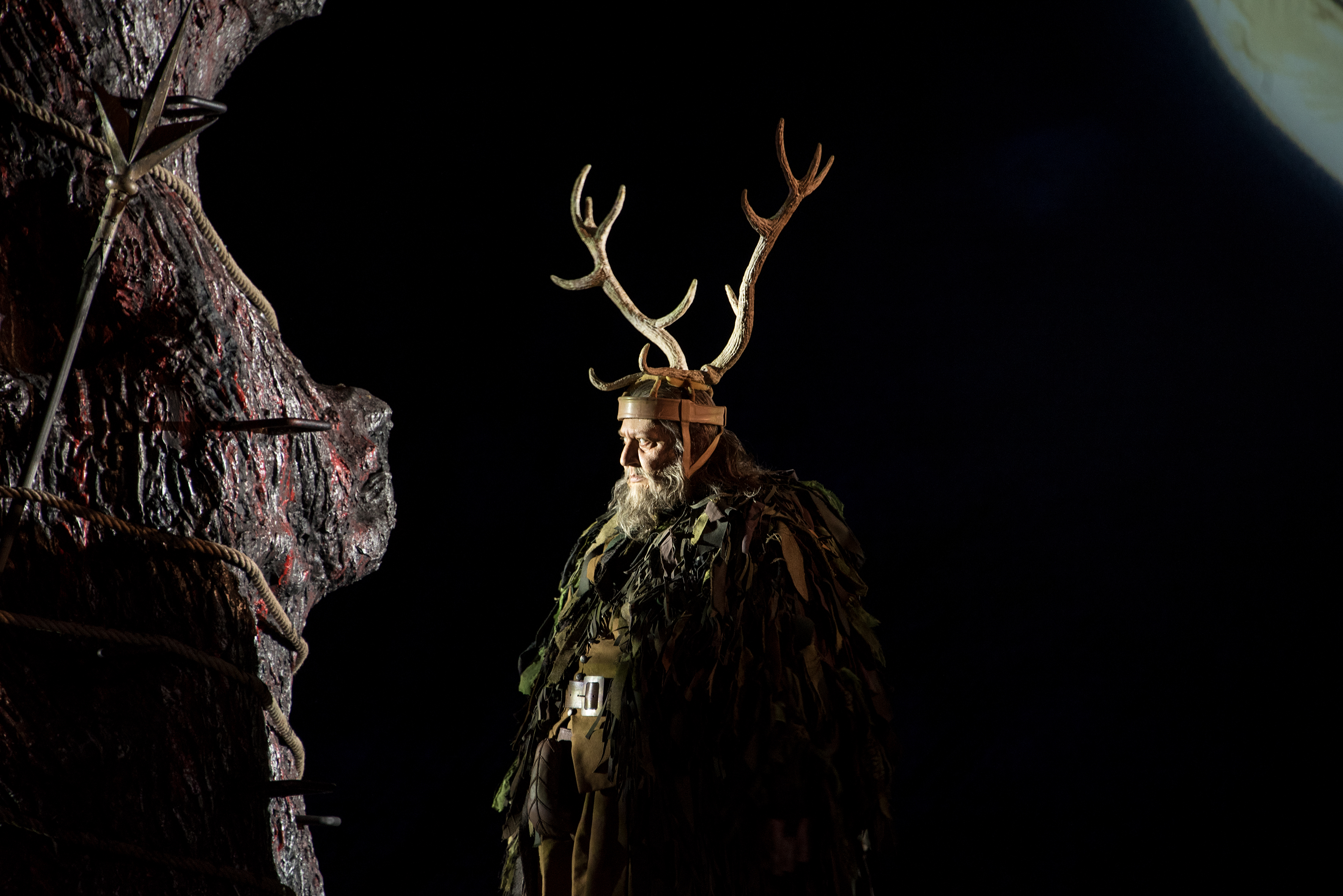
Vienna, 2016

Another recurrent question is how much, if at all, Verdi was influenced by Wagner's comic opera Die Meistersinger. At the time of the premiere this was a sensitive subject; many Italians were suspicious of or hostile to Wagner's music, and were protective in a nationalistic way of Verdi's reputation. Nevertheless, Verdi's new style was markedly different from that of his popular works of the 1850s and 1860s, and it seemed to some to have Wagnerian echoes. In 1999 the critic Andrew Porter wrote, "That Falstaff was Verdi's and Boito's answer to Wagner's Meistersinger seems evident now. But the Italian Falstaff moves more quickly." Toscanini, who did more than anyone else to bring Falstaff into the regular operatic repertoire, commented:

the difference between Falstaff, which is the absolute masterpiece, and Die Meistersinger, which is an outstanding Wagnerian opera. Just think for a moment how many musical means – beautiful ones, certainly – Wagner must make use of to describe the Nuremberg night. And look how Verdi gets a similarly startling effect at a similar moment with three notes.

Verdi scholars including Julian Budden have analysed the music in symphonic terms – the opening section "a perfect little sonata movement", the second act concluding with a variant of the classic slow concertante ensemble leading to a fast stretto, and the whole opera ending with "the most academic of musical forms", a fugue. Milnes suggests that this shows "a wise old conservative's warning about the excesses of the verismo school of Italian opera" already on the rise by the 1890s. Among the solo numbers woven into the continuous score are Falstaff's "honour" monologue, which concludes the first scene, and his reminiscent arietta ("Quand'ero paggio") about himself as a young page. The young lovers, Nannetta and Fenton, are given a lyrical and playful duet ("Labbra di foco") in act 1; in act 3, Fenton's impassioned love song, "Dal labbro il canto estasiato vola" briefly becomes a duet when Nannetta joins him. She then has the last substantial solo section of the score, the "fairy" aria, "Sul fil d'un soffio etesio", described by Parker as "yet another aria suffused with the soft orchestral colours that characterize this scene".

The score is seen by the critic Richard Osborne as rich in self-parody, with sinister themes from Rigoletto and Un ballo in maschera transmuted into comedy. For Osborne the nocturnal music of act 3 draws on the examples of Weber, Berlioz and Mendelssohn, creating a mood akin to that of Shakespeare's A Midsummer Night's Dream. Osborne views the whole opera as an ensemble piece, and he comments that grand soliloquy in the old Verdian style is reserved for Ford's "jealousy" aria in act 2, which is almost tragic in style but comic in effect, making Ford "a figure to be laughed at." Osborne concludes his analysis, "Falstaff is comedy's musical apogee: the finest opera, inspired by the finest dramatist, by the finest opera composer the world has known".

== Recordings ==
There are two early recordings of Falstaff's short arietta "Quand'ero paggio". Pini Corsi, the original Ford, recorded it in 1904, and Maurel followed in 1907. The first recording of the complete opera was made by Italian Columbia in March and April 1932. It was conducted by Lorenzo Molajoli with the chorus and orchestra of La Scala, and a cast including Giacomo Rimini as Falstaff and Pia Tassinari as Alice. Some live stage performances were recorded in the 1930s, but the next studio recording was that conducted by Arturo Toscanini for the 1950 NBC radio broadcast released on disc by RCA Victor. The first stereophonic recording was conducted by Herbert von Karajan for EMI in 1956.

Among the singers whose performances of the title role are on live or studio recordings, Italians include Renato Bruson, Tito Gobbi, Rolando Panerai, Ruggero Raimondi, Mariano Stabile, Giuseppe Taddei and Giuseppe Valdengo; Francophone singers include Gabriel Bacquier, Jean-Philippe Lafont and José van Dam; Germans include Walter Berry, Dietrich Fischer-Dieskau and Hans Hotter; and UK and US singers include Geraint Evans, Donald Gramm, Bryn Terfel, Leonard Warren and Willard White.

== Notes, references and sources ==
Notes

Sources

- Baldini, Gabriele [in Italian] (1980). The Story of Giuseppe Verdi: Oberto to Un ballo in maschera. Cambridge: Cambridge University Press. ISBN 978-0-521-22911-1 – via Internet Archive.
- Beaumont, Antony, ed. (1987). Busoni: Selected Letters. New York: Columbia University Press. ISBN 0-231-06460-8
- Beecham, Thomas (1959). A Mingled Chime. London: Hutchinson. OCLC 470511334.
- Boito, Arrigo; Giuseppe Verdi (1980) [1893]. Falstaff in Full Score. New York: Dover. ISBN 978-0-486-24017-6.
- Budden, Julian (1984). The Operas of Verdi, Volume 1: From Oberto to Rigoletto. London: Cassell. ISBN 978-0-304-31058-6.
- Budden, Julian (1984). The Operas of Verdi, Volume 3: From Don Carlos to Falstaff. London: Cassell. ISBN 978-0-304-30740-1.
- Civetta, Cesare (2012). The Real Toscanini – Musicians Reveal the Maestro. New York: Hal Leonard. ISBN 978-1-57467-241-1.
- Grogan, Christopher (2010) [2007]. Imogen Holst: A Life in Music. Woodbridge, UK and New York: Boydell Press. ISBN 978-1-84383-599-8.
- Hepokoski, James (1983). Giuseppe Verdi "Falstaff". Cambridge: Cambridge University Press. ISBN 978-0-521-23534-1.
- Kimbell, David (2001). "Falstaff". In Holden, Amanda (ed.). The New Penguin Opera Guide. New York: Penguin Putnam. ISBN 978-0-14-029312-8.
- McDonald, Russ (2009). To astonish the world, Notes to Glyndebourne DVD recording. Waldron, Heathfield, UK: Opus Arte. OCLC 610513504.
- Melchiori, Giorgio (1999). "Introduction". The Merry Wives of Windsor. Arden Shakespeare. London: Thomson. ISBN 978-0-17-443561-7.
- Milnes, Rodney (2004). Falstaff: notes to LSO Live recording. London: London Symphony Orchestra. OCLC 57210727.
- Morris, Corbyn (1744). An Essay Towards Fixing the True Standards of Wit, Humour, Raillery, Satire, and Ridicule. London: J Roberts and W Bickerton. OCLC 83444213.
- Osborne, Richard (1989). Karajan conducts Falstaff. London: EMI. OCLC 42632423.
- Osborne, Richard (1998). Herbert von Karajan: A Life in Music. London: Chatto and Windus. ISBN 978-1-85619-763-2.
- Phillips-Matz, Mary Jane (1993). Verdi: A Biography. London and New York: Oxford University Press. ISBN 978-0-19-313204-7.
- Rowse, A L (1978). "The Merry Wives of Windsor". The Annotated Shakespeare. Vol. 1. London: Orbis. ISBN 978-0-85613-087-8.
- Sachs, Harvey (1988). Toscanini. New York: Harper and Row. ISBN 978-0-06-091473-8.
- Shakespeare, William (1994). "The Merry Wives of Windsor". In Peter Alexander (ed.). Complete works of William Shakespeare. Glasgow: HarperCollins. ISBN 978-0-00-470474-6.
- Steen, Michael (2003). The Lives and Times of the Great Composers. New York: Icon Books. ISBN 978-1-56159-228-9.
- Streatfeild, R A (1895). Masters of Italian Music. London: Osgood McIlvain. OCLC 2578278.
- Vickers, Brian (2002). William Shakespeare: The Critical Heritage, Volume 3: 1733–1752. London: Routledge. ISBN 978-1-134-78355-7.
- Wechsberg, Joseph (1974). Verdi. London: Weidenfeld and Nicolson. ISBN 978-0-297-76818-0.
