= Paolo Pelagalli-Rossetti =

Italian opera singer

Paolo Pelagalli-Rossetti was an Italian tenor. He is best remembered for the role of Bardolfo in Verdi's Falstaff, performed at its premiere on 9 February 1893.
