= Amedeo Bassi =

Italian tenor (1872 - 1949)

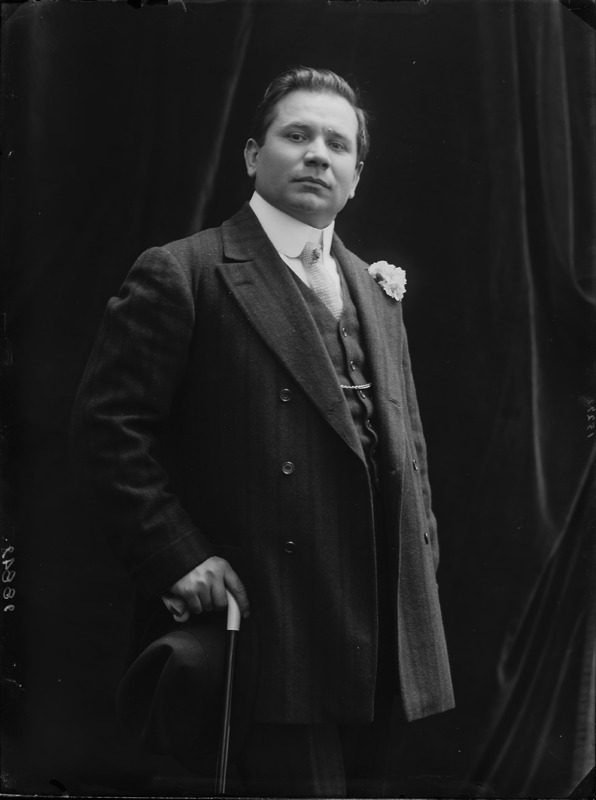
- Born: 29 July 1872; Montespertoli, Italy
- Died: 14 January 1949 (aged 76); Florence, Italy
- Occupation: Tenor

Amedeo Bassi (29 July 1872 - 14 January 1949) was an Italian tenor.

== Life and career ==
Born in Montespertoli, Bassi studied singing with Marquis Pavesi-Negri, and made his official debut in 1897, in Filippo Marchetti's opera Ruy Blas. Thanks to the immediate acclaim he received, he started an intense career in Italy, where he performed in the major opera houses of the time including La Scala in Milan and Teatro di San Carlo in Naples, and abroad, where he performed multiple times at the Royal Opera House, at the Metropolitan Opera House, at the Chicago Opera House, as well as in Paris, Vienna, Latin America, Russia, Spain. He retired from stage in the second half of the 1920s, and spent the rest of his life as a singing teacher, having among his pupils Ferruccio Tagliavini. In his hometown, he named a museum and a music festival.
