= Elvina Ramella =

Italian soprano

Elvina Ramella

Elvina Ramella (3 February 1927 - 3 March 2007) was an Italian operatic soprano.

== Life and career ==
Born in Biella, Ramella began her singing studies at a very young age at the Conservatorio Arrigo Boito in Parma under the guidance of Italo Brancucci and continued at the Milan Conservatory where she graduated under the guidance of Giannina Arangi-Lombardi. She perfected her skills with Elvira de Hidalgo.

She won several national competitions: at the Accademia Nazionale di Santa Cecilia in Rome and the "Giovanni Battista Viotti" and Aslico competitions, debuting at the Teatro Nuovo in Milan as Rosina in The Barber of Seville She established herself on the international scene replacing resoundingly Joan Sutherland in La sonnambula at La Fenice in Venice in 1961.

She had an intense activity in Italian and foreign theatres, including La Scala in Milan, Teatro dell'Opera di Roma, Teatro San Carlo in Naples, La Fenice in Venice, Teatro Carlo Felice in Genoa, Teatro Massimo in Palermo, Teatro Lirico Giuseppe Verdi in Trieste, the Arena di Verona, as well as the main theatres in Germany, England, France, Ireland and the United States. On television, she took part in the screenplay on the life of Niccolò Paganini and in numerous musical columns

She sang with great directors, including Carlo Maria Giulini, Tullio Serafin, Karl Böhm, Nikolaus Harnoncourt and worked with important directors such as Giorgio Strehler and Franco Zeffirelli.

She carried out didactic activities. Among her students was Anna Caterina Antonacci.

Ramella died in Milan at age 80.

== Recording ==
- La bohème (Musetta), with Rosanna Carteri, Ferruccio Tagliavini, Giuseppe Taddei, Cesare Siepi, conductor. Gabriele Santini - Cetra 1952
