= Mefistofele =

Opera by Arrigo Boito

- Opera by Arrigo Boito
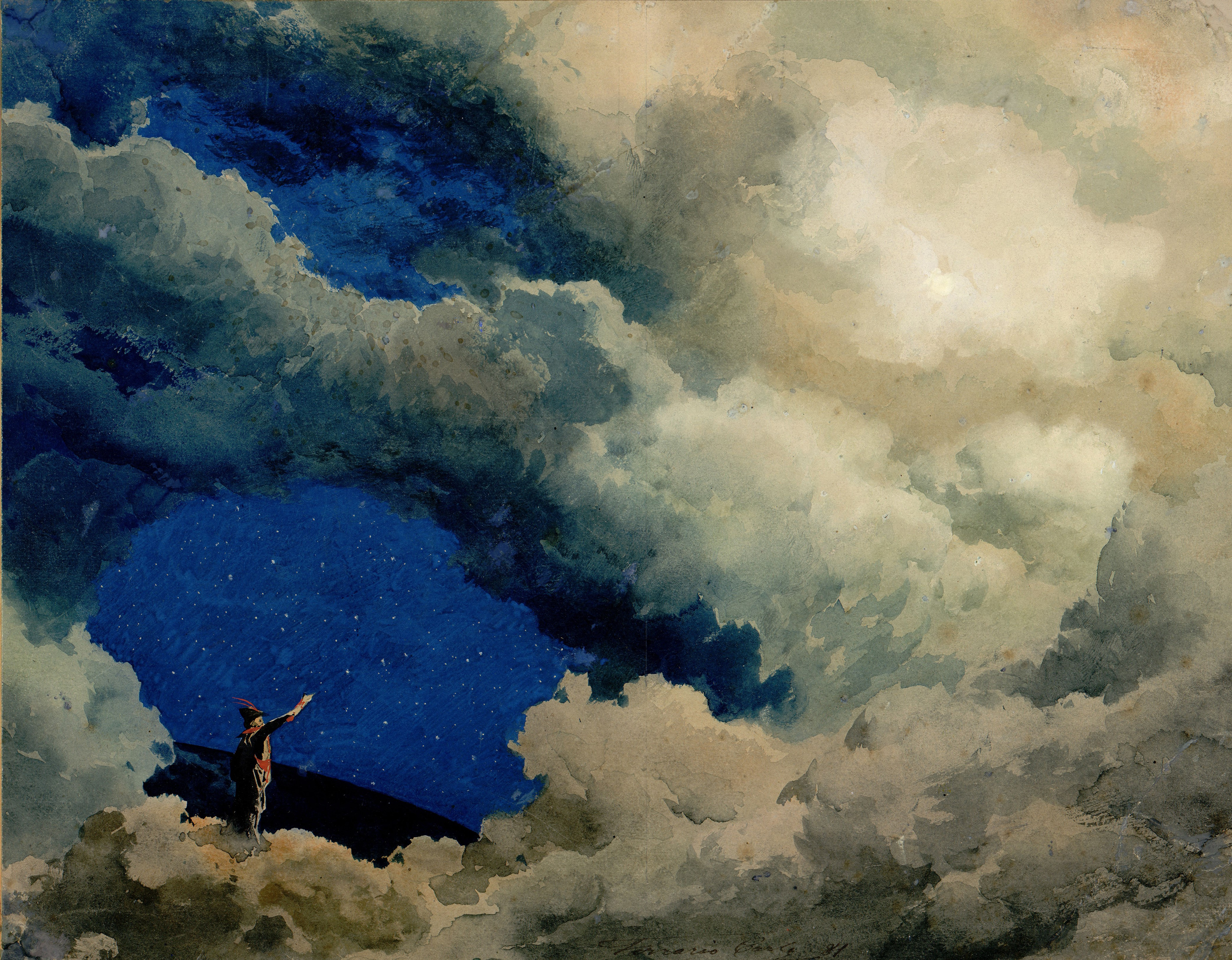
- Set design for the Prologue in Heaven, by Carlo Ferrario, 1881
- Librettist: Boito
- Language: Italian
- Based on: Faust legend
- Premiere: 5 March 1868; Teatro alla Scala, Milan

Mefistofele (Italian pronunciation: [mefiˈstɔːfele]) is an Italian opera in a prologue and five acts, later reduced to four acts and an epilogue, the only completed opera with music by the Italian composer-librettist Arrigo Boito (there are several completed operas for which he was librettist only). It is an adaptation of the German legend of Faust.

The opera was given its premiere on 5 March 1868 at La Scala, Milan, under the baton of the composer, despite his lack of experience and skill as a conductor. However, it was not a success and was immediately withdrawn after only two performances both of which were hissed at by the audiences. Revisions in 1875 resulted in success in Bologna and, with further adjustments in 1876 for Venice, the opera was performed elsewhere.

== Composition history ==
Boito began consideration of an opera on the Faustian theme after completing his studies at the Milan Conservatory in 1861. Mefistofele is one of many pieces of classical music based on the Faust legend and, like many other composers, Boito used Goethe's version as his starting point. He was an admirer of Richard Wagner and, like him, chose to write his own libretto, something which was virtually unheard of in Italian opera up to that time. Much of the text is actually a literal translation from Goethe's German to Boito's Italian.

The most popular earlier opera based on the legend was Gounod's Faust, which Boito regarded as a superficial and frivolous treatment of a profound subject. Furthermore, Boito was contemptuous of what he saw as the low operatic standards prevailing in Italy at that time, and he determined to make his new work distinctive, both musically and intellectually, different from anything that had been heard before. He hoped that it would be a wake-up call and an inspiration to other young Italian composers.

The piano–vocal score was completed in 1867 while Boito was visiting relatives in Poland.

== Performance history and revisions ==
Operatic bass Ezio Pinza as Mefistofele, Teatro alla Scala, Milan, 1933-1934.

=== 19th century ===
As the evening of 5 March 1868 premiere performance progressed, the hostility of the audience, unfamiliar with Boito's avant-garde musical style and unimpressed by many of the scenes (notably the scene in the emperor's court), steadily increased. Furthermore, the work was far too long and the cast inadequate for the complexities of the music. When the curtain finally came down well after midnight, it was clear that the premiere had been a failure. After just two performances, with the second one being divided into two sections and presented on successive evenings, the opera was withdrawn.

Boito immediately set to work revising his opera, greatly reduced its length by about one-third by making many scenes smaller in scale. The most important changes were the following: Boito removed the entire first scene of the original act 4 (scene in the imperial court), symphonic intermezzo "La Battaglia" and expanded act 5 as an epilogue, adding the duet "Lontano, lontano" to act 3 in the process. Faust was changed from a baritone to a tenor.

The revised version was premiered in Bologna on 4 October 1875, this time sung by what is generally regarded to be a very fine cast, and was an immediate success. This change in reception is thought to be partly due to Boito's revisions making the opera more traditional in style, and also to the Italian audience having become familiar with, and more willing to accept, developments in opera associated with those of Richard Wagner.

Boito made further minor revisions during 1876, and this version was first performed at the Teatro Rossini in Venice on 13 May 1876. The first British performance took place at Her Majesty's Theatre, London on 6 July 1880 and the American premiere was on 16 November 1880 in Boston. Thereafter, Boito continued to make small changes until the final definitive production in Milan on 25 May 1881.

=== 20th century and beyond ===
In the early 20th century, revivals of the opera were associated particularly with the famous Russian bass Feodor Chaliapin: he sang the title role on the occasion of his first appearance outside Russia (La Scala, Milan, 16 March 1901) and also on his North American debut (Metropolitan Opera, New York, 20 November 1907). Chaliapin made his first appearance at the Royal Opera House, Covent Garden, on 25 May 1926. Parts of a subsequent performance on 31 May were recorded by His Master's Voice.

In 1969, the New York City Opera presented a new production by Tito Capobianco, with Norman Treigle scoring his greatest success in the title role.

The Metropolitan Opera has given the work from time to time since it first appeared there on 5 December 1883. The Royal Opera in London has only given one performance of the opera, a concert version in March 1998 at the Barbican Centre, with Samuel Ramey as the title character.

As Mefistofele, Ramey made the role a signature one, appearing in many productions in the 1980s and early 1990s, including one given by the San Francisco Opera in 1989 and another in November 1994. San Francisco Opera revived the 1994 production of the opera as the first production of its 2013/14 season with Ildar Abdrazakov as Mefistofele, Patricia Racette as Margherita and Ramón Vargas as Faust.

The opera was performed as part of the 2013/14 season at the Croatian National Theatre (HNK Split), directed by Michał Znaniecki and conducted by Nikša Bareza.

In August 2014, the opera was performed at the 13th Opera Festival of the Theatro da Paz in Belém, Brazil, after a 50-year hiatus from Brazilian theaters. There Mefistofele was played by Denis Sedov and Faust played by Fernando Portari.

Due to the COVID-19 pandemic, the Dutch National Opera's performance of Mefistofele in 2020 could not go ahead as planned, so an alternative production of the work titled Faust [Working Title] was performed. The concept of this production was created by director Lisenka Heijboer Castañon and conductor Manoj Kamps, in which they invited composers and arrangers to respond to Boito's original work. This included a new arrangement of Boito's famous prison aria "L'altra notte in fondo al mare" from Mefistofele arranged by the British composer Grace-Evangeline Mason for the Moldovan soprano Olga Busuioc who was an original cast member for the production.

== Roles ==
Roles, voice types, premiere casts
Role	First version		Revised Bologna version	
Role	Voice type	Cast, 5 March 1868 Conductor: Arrigo Boito	Voice type	Cast, 4 October 1875 Conductor: Emilio Usiglio
Mefistofele	bass	François-Marcel (Marcello) Junca	bass	Romano Nannetti
Faust, a scholar	baritone	Gerolamo Spallazzi	tenor	Italo Campanini
Margherita, a simple girl	soprano	Mélanie-Charlotte Reboux	soprano	Erminia Borghi-Mamo
Elena (Helen of Troy)	soprano	Mélanie-Charlotte Reboux	soprano	Erminia Borghi-Mamo
Wagner, Faust's pupil	tenor		tenor	Carlo Casarini
Nereo, a Greek elder		(no role)	tenor	Carlo Casarini
Marta, Margherita's neighbour	contralto	Giuseppina Flory	contralto	Antonietta Mazzucco (De-Fassi?)
Pantalis, Helen's companion		(no role)	contralto	Antonietta Mazzucco (De-Fassi?)
The Astrologer	bass	Luigi Alessandrini		(no role)
Additional characters from the first version: The Herald; The Beggar; The Emperor; Lilith; Paris; A Boy; A Goblin
Chorus (second version): heavenly host, Chorus Mysticus, cherubim, penitents, strollers, crossbowmen, hunters, students, villagers, women of the people, middle class people, witches, warlocks, Greek chorus women, Sirens, Nereids, Greek coryphaei, warriors

== Synopsis ==
=== Prologue ===
A heavenly chorus of angels praises God the Creator. Mephistopheles (Mefistofele) scornfully declares that he can win the soul of Faust. His challenge is accepted by the Forces of Good.

=== Act 1 ===
Scene 1, Easter Sunday

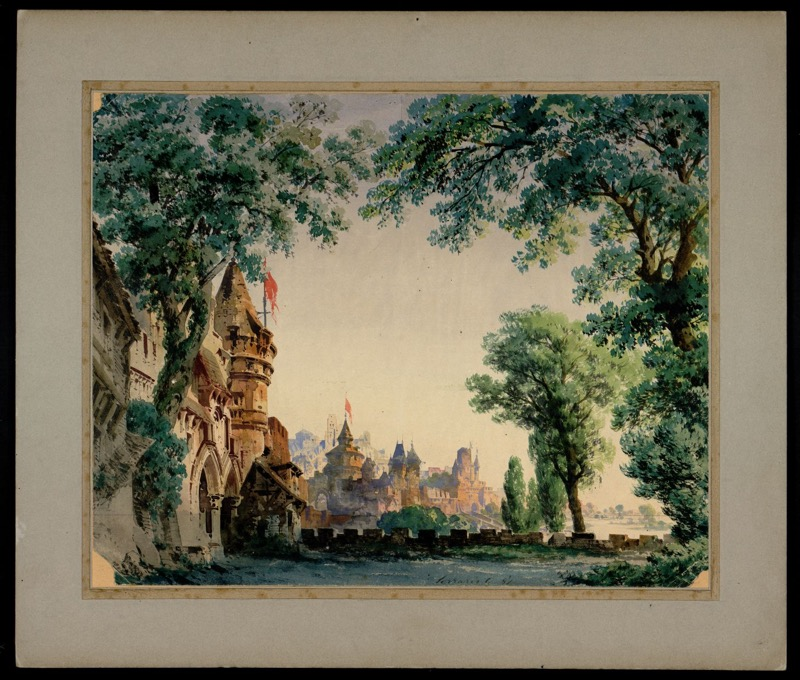
Gate and ramparts of Frankfurt am Main, sketch for act 1, scene 1 (Ferrario)

The aged Dr. Faust and his pupil Wagner are watching the Easter celebrations in the main square in Frankfurt. Faust senses that they are being followed by a mysterious friar, about whom he senses something evil. Wagner dismisses his master’s feelings of unease and as darkness falls they return to Faust’s home.

Scene 2, The Pact

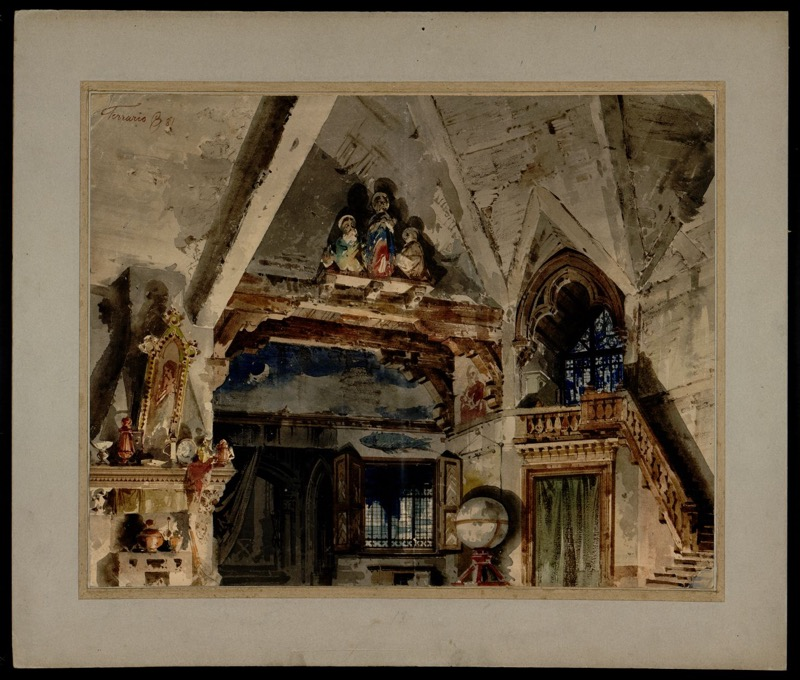
Set design for act 1, scene 2 (Ferario)

Faust is in his study, deep in contemplation. His thoughts are disturbed in dramatic fashion by the sudden appearance of the sinister friar, whom he now recognizes as a manifestation of the Devil (Mefistofele). Far from being terrified, Faust is intrigued and enters into a discussion with Mefistofele culminating in an agreement by which he will give his soul to the devil on his death in return for worldly bliss for the remainder of his life.

=== Act 2 ===
Scene 1, The Garden

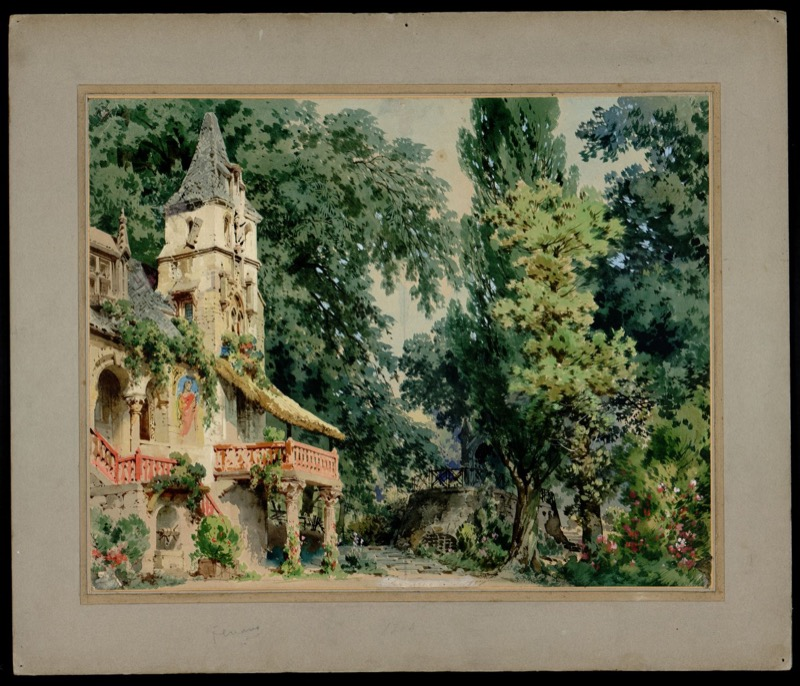
Marta's garden for act 2, scene 1 (Ferrario)

Restored to his youth, Faust has infatuated Margareta, an unsophisticated village girl. She is unable to resist his seductive charms and agrees to drug her mother with a sleeping draught and meet him for a night of passion. Meanwhile, Mefistofele amuses himself with Martha, another of the village girls.

Scene 2, The Witches Sabbath

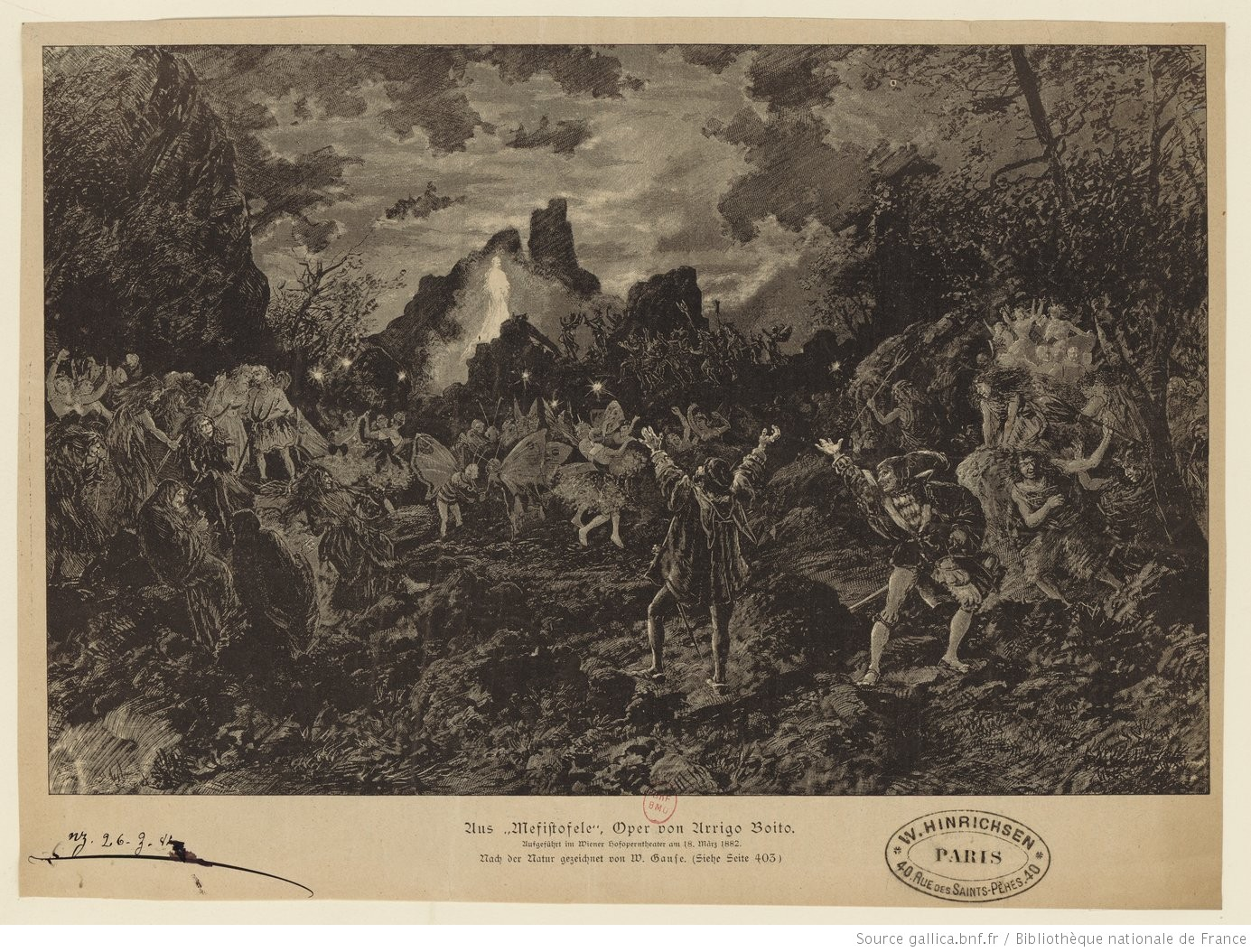
Witches Sabbath (by Wilhelm Gause, performed at the Vienna Court Opera, March 18, 1882)

Mefistofele has carried Faust away to witness a Witches' Sabbath on the Brocken mountain. They reach to the top and hear the sound of witches approaching from below. They draw near and Mefistofele, declaring himself king, calls to them to bow down before him. The devil mounts his throne and proclaims his contempt for the World and all its worthless inhabitants. As the orgy reaches its climax, Faust sees a vision of Margherita, apparently in chains and with her throat cut. Mefistofele reassures him that the vision was a false illusion. The revels continue.

=== Act 3 ===
Faust's vision had been true. Margareta lies in a dismal cell, her mind in a state of confusion and despair. She has been imprisoned and condemned to death for poisoning her mother with the sleeping draught supplied by Faust and for drowning the baby she had borne him. Faust begs Mefistofele to help them escape together. They enter the cell and at first Margareta does not recognize her rescuers. Her joy at being reunited with Faust turns to horror when she sees Mefistofele and recognizes that he is the devil. Refusing to succumb to further evil, Margareta begs for divine forgiveness. She collapses to the cell floor as the Celestial choir proclaims her redemption.

=== Act 4 ===
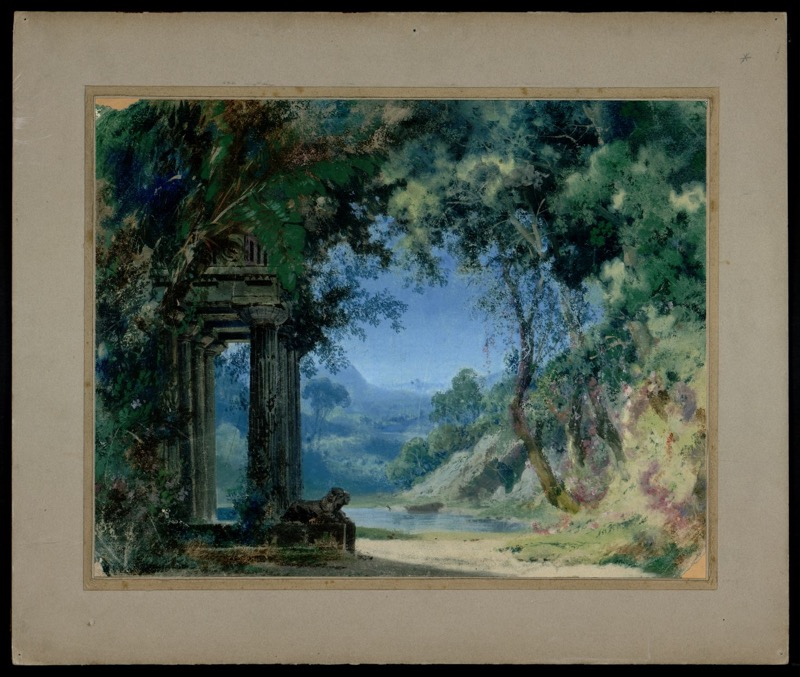
Set design for act 4 (Ferrario)

Mefistofele has now transported Faust back in time to Ancient Greece. Helen of Troy and her followers are enjoying the luxurious and exotic surroundings on the banks of a magnificent river. Faust, attired more splendidly than ever, is easily able to win the heart of the beautiful princess. In a passionate outpouring they declare their undying love and devotion to each other.

=== Epilogue ===
Back in his study, Faust, once more an old man, reflects that neither in the world of reality nor of illusion was he able to find the perfect experience he craved. He feels that the end of his life is close, but desperate for his final victory, Mefistofele urges him to embark on more exotic adventures. For a moment Faust hesitates, but suddenly seizing his Bible he cries out for God's forgiveness. Mefistofele has been thwarted; he disappears into the background as Faust dies and the Celestial choir once more sings of ultimate redemption.

== Recordings ==
Year	Cast: Mefistofele, Faust, Margherita	Conductor Opera house and orchestra	Label
1931	Nazzareno De Angelis, Antonio Melandri, Mafalda Favero	Lorenzo Molajoli; Orchestra and Chorus of La Scala, Milan	Naxos Historical (originally Italian Columbia); Cat: 8.110273-74
1952	Giulio Neri, Gianni Poggi, Rosetta Noli	Franco Capuana; Orchestra and Chorus of La Scala, Milan	CD: Cantus Classics; Cat: 500 330
1954	Giulio Neri, Ferruccio Tagliavini, Marcella Pobbe	Angelo Questa; Coro del Teatro Regio di Torino, Orchestra Sinfonica RAI Torino	CD: Warner Fonit; Cat: 0927 40350-2
1956	Boris Christoff, Giacinto Prandelli, Orietta Moscucci	Vittorio Gui; Rome Opera House Orchestra and Chorus	CD: EMI Classics; Cat: 65655
1958	Cesare Siepi, Mario Del Monaco, Renata Tebaldi	Tullio Serafin; Orchestra e Coro dell' Accademia Santa Cecilia, Roma	CD: Decca; Decca - Ace Of Diamonds (GOS 591-3)
1973	Norman Treigle, Plácido Domingo, Montserrat Caballé	Julius Rudel; Ambrosian Opera Chorus and London Symphony Orchestra	CD: EMI Classics; Cat: 07243 566501 2 1
1982	Nicolai Ghiaurov, Luciano Pavarotti, Mirella Freni	Oliviero De Fabritiis; London Opera Chorus and National Philharmonic Orchestra	CD: Decca; Cat: 000289 475 6666 3
1985	Nicola Ghiuselev, Kaludi Kaludov, Stefka Evstatieva	Ivan Marinov; Sofia National Opera Chorus and Orchestra	CD: Capriccio; Cat:C51186
1988	Samuel Ramey, Plácido Domingo, Éva Marton	Giuseppe Patanè; Hungarian State Orchestra and Hungarian Opera Chorus	CD: Sony; Cat: B0000026QH
1989	Samuel Ramey, Dennis O'Neill, Gabriela Beňačková	Maurizio Arena (conductor) San Francisco Opera, Robert Carsen (director)	Blu-Ray, DVD Arthaus
1996	Samuel Ramey, Vincenzo La Scola, Michèle Crider	Riccardo Muti; Orchestra and chorus of La Scala	CD: RCA Red Seal; Cat: 8985334942
2004	Mark S. Doss, Alberto Cupido, Annalisa Raspagliosi	Paolo Carignani; Orchestra and chorus Oper Frankfurt	CD: HR Musik; Cat: B000HT1WQ0
2008	Ferruccio Furlanetto, Giuseppe Filianoti, Dimitra Theodossiou	Stefano Ranzani; Orchestra and chorus, Teatro Massimo, Palermo	DVD:Dynamic (record label); Cat: 33581
2014	Ildar Abdrazakov, Ramón Vargas, Patricia Racette	Nicola Luisotti; San Francisco Opera Orchestra and Chorus	2 DVDs: EuroArts; Cat: 2059678

== In popular culture ==
Batman Begins depicts the opera being performed onstage, using an excerpt of "Rampiamo, rampiamo, che il tempo ci gabba" (Chorus of Warlocks and Witches from act 2, scene 2) from the 1973 EMI recording (see "Recordings" above). During the scene, performers dressed as bat-like monsters frighten young Bruce Wayne, who asks to leave.

An avant-garde video directed by Yevgeniy Timokhin on a remix with the verse "E' mia madre addormentata" from Margareta's aria in act 3 was awarded the Euro Video Grand Prix 2006.
