= Italo Brancucci =

Italian composer (1904–1958)

Italo Brancucci (1904 in La Spezia – 1958 in Rome) was an Italian composer and singing teacher. He taught at the Conservatorio Arrigo Boito in Parma for many years. Several of his pupils went on to have major opera careers, including Luigi Infantino, Elvina Ramella, Ferruccio Tagliavini, and Renata Tebaldi. As a composer he is best known for his opera Fiorella which premiered at the Teatro Lirico Giuseppe Verdi in Trieste on 30 December 1936. It was subsequently performed at a number of other Italian opera houses during the late 1930s, including at the Teatro Regio in Parma on 15 February 1938 with Rina Corsi in the title role and Franco Lo Giudice as Eugenio Beauharnais.

== Sources ==
- Senza calare di tono: Il magistero culturale e musicale di Mario Dellapina by Ubaldo Delsante
