= David (Milhaud) =

David is a Biblical opera in five acts and twelve scenes by composer Darius Milhaud. The opera uses a Hebrew language libretto by Armand Lunel which is based on the Books of Samuel. The work was commissioned with funds provided by conductor Serge Koussevitzky who died prior to the opera's premiere, and was composed in celebration of the 3,000th anniversary of the founding of the city of Jerusalem by King David; the man who is the subject of the opera. The opera premiered in Jerusalem on June 1, 1954, in a concert version presented as part of the International Society for Contemporary Music's World Music Festival, which while held in Haifa, included the Jerusalem performance of Milhaud's opera. Conductor George Singer led the musical forces for the premiere which was attended by several prominent Israeli figures of the day, including then president Yitzhak Ben-Zvi.

The first fully staged production of David was given at La Scala in Milan, Italy, in January 1955 using lavish sets and costumes by Nicola Alexandrovich Benois. Baritone Anselmo Colzani portrayed the tile role in this production which was led by conductor Nino Sanzogno. Others in the cast included Nicola Rossi-Lemeni as Saul, Marcella Pobbe as Bathsheba, and Italo Tajo as Samuel. The United States premiere of the opera was presented on September 23, 1956, at the Hollywood Bowl in Los Angeles, California, with a cast of 400 performers led by conductor Izler Solomon. Baritone Harve Presnell portrayed the title role in this production with Herva Nelli as Bathsheba, Mack Harrell as Saul, and Giorgio Tozzi as Samuel.
