= Pia Tassinari =

Italian opera singer (1903–1995)

- Pia Tassinari (photo with dedication)
- Occupation: opera soprano singer
- Years active: 1927-1950s

Pia Tassinari (15 September 1903, Modigliana, near Forlì – 15 May 1995, Faenza) was an Italian soprano and later mezzo-soprano, particularly associated with the Italian and French repertories.

== Life and career ==
Born Domenica Tassinari, she studied in Bologna with Cesare Vezzani and in Milan with Marcantoni. She made her debut in 1927 as Mimi, in Casale Monferrato. She sang widely in Italy before making her debut at La Scala in Milan in 1932 in the première of Veretti’s Il favorito del re. She also appeared in Russia and South America, and made her debut at the Metropolitan Opera in New York City in 1947, as Tosca. She appeared in Naples in a notable revival of Saverio Mercadante's Il giuramento in 1955.

She sang a wide range of roles, including: Marguerite, Manon, Elisabeth, Elsa, Fedora, etc. She was also much admired in contemporary works by Zandonai, Wolf-Ferrari, and Respighi.

In the 1950s, as her voice darkened, she tackled successfully mezzo-soprano roles, notably Carmen, Charlotte, Amneris and Ulrica.

She was married to tenor Ferruccio Tagliavini with whom she often appeared on stage and on disc. They can be heard together in a number of complete opera recordings: Un ballo in maschera, Martha, Werther, L'arlesiana, and most notably L'amico Fritz, conducted by Pietro Mascagni himself.
