= Giulio Neri =

Italian opera singer (1909–1958)

Neri as Mephistopheles.

Giulio Neri (21 May 1909, in Torrita di Siena – 21 April 1958, in Rome) was an Italian operatic bass, particularly associated with the Italian repertory.

Neri studied first in Florence with Ferraresi, and completed his studies in Rome. He made his stage debut in 1935, at the Teatro delle Quattro Fontane in Rome, where he sang mostly comprimario roles. He then joined the Rome Opera in 1938, where he quickly established himself as one of the leading basses of his generation.

He sang throughout Italy, making his La Scala debut in 1941. After the war, he began appearing abroad, notably at the Royal Opera House in London, the Liceo in Barcelona, the Bavarian State Opera in Munich, the Teatro Colón in Buenos Aires, etc.

He sang most of the great bass roles in opera by Verdi and some Wagner, such as Sparafucile, Ferrando, Fiesco, Padre Guardiano, Grand Inquisitore, Ramfis, King Heinrich, King Marke, Gurnemanz, etc. Other notable roles included; Oroveso, Alvise and Mefistofele, one of his greatest roles.

Neri had a dark, powerful, cavernous voice and a strong stage presence. He can be heard in several recordings he made for Cetra, notably La Favorite, Rigoletto, Don Carlo, Aida, La Gioconda, and Mefistofele. He also appeared in a film version of Rigoletto, opposite Tito Gobbi, in 1946.

He died suddenly of a heart attack, one month short of his 49th birthday.

== Selected filmography ==
- Before Him All Rome Trembled (1946)
- The Force of Destiny (1950)

== Sources ==
- The Complete Dictionary of Opera & Operetta, James Anderson, (Wings Books, 1993) ISBN 0-517-09156-9
- The Metropolitan Opera Guide to Recorded Opera, edited by Paul Gruber, (W.W. Norton & Company, 1993) ISBN 0-393-03444-5
