= Alfredo Kraus discography =

This is a list of recordings by the Spanish tenor Alfredo Kraus.

== Listing by role ==
#	Composer	Title	Role	Recordings (date, conductor)
1	Emilio Arrieta	Marina	Jorge	1963, José Olmedo; 1987?, Enrique Ricci; 1998, Victor Pablo Pérez
2	Daniel François Esprit Auber	La muette de Portici	Masaniello	1986, Thomas Fulton
3	Vincenzo Bellini	La sonnambula	Elvino	1961, Nello Santi
4	Vincenzo Bellini	I puritani	Arturo Talbot	1962, Nino Verchi; 1964, Alberto Erede; 1966, Richard Bonynge; 1967, Manno Wolf-Ferrari; 1969, Aldo Ceccato; 1969, Argeo Quadri; 1971, Giacomo Zani; 1972, Gianandrea Gavazzeni; 1972, Michelangelo Veltri; 1974, Gianfranco Rivoli; 1974, Nicola Rescigno; 1979, Riccardo Muti
5	Georges Bizet	Les pêcheurs de perles	Nadir	1960, Armando La Rosa Parodi; 1966, Jean Fournet; 1970, Carlo Felice Cillario; 1981, Gianfranco Rivoli
6	Georges Bizet	La jolie fille de Perth	Henry Smith	1985, Georges Prêtre
7	Arrigo Boito	Mefistofele	Faust	1965, Nino Sanzogno; 1965, Anton Guadagno
8	Tomás Bretón	La verbena de la paloma	Julián	1972, Enrique García Asensio
9	Ruperto Chapí	La tempestad	Beltrán	1959, Enrique Estela
10	Ruperto Chapí	La bruja	Leonardo	1960, Benito Lauret
11	Ruperto Chapí	La revoltosa	Felipe	1972, Enrique García Asensio
12	Luigi Cherubini	Ali Baba, ou les quarante voleurs	Nadir	1963, Nino Sanzogno
13	Léo Delibes	Lakmé	Gérald	1980, Nicola Rescigno
14	Gaetano Donizetti	Don Pasquale	Ernesto	1963, Alberto Erede; 1965, Fernando Previtali; 1973, Piero Bellugi; 1974, Bruno Bartoletti; 1978, Sarah Caldwell; 1979, Nicola Rescigno
15	Gaetano Donizetti	Lucia di Lammermoor	Edgardo	1963, Bruno Rigacci; 1964, Alberto Zedda; 1970, Anton Guadagno; 1970, Rafael Frühbeck de Burgos; 1971, Oliviero De Fabritiis; 1972, Juan Emilio Martini; 1975, Lamberto Gardelli; 1982, Richard Bonynge; 1983, Gianluigi Gelmetti; 1983, Nicola Rescigno; 1986, Michelangelo Veltri; 1986, Angelo Campori; 1987, Gian Paolo Sanzogno; 1988, Richard Bonynge
16	Gaetano Donizetti	La favorite	Fernando	1964, Carlo Felice Cillario; 1967, Bruno Bartoletti; 1970, Gianandrea Gavazzeni; 1971, Oliviero De Fabritiis; 1975, Eve Queler; 1976, Francesco Molinari-Pradelli; 1976, Maurizio Arena; 1982, Fabiano Monica; 1982, Armando Gatto; 1991, Gian Paolo Sanzogno (Lisbon); 1991, Gian Paolo Sanzogno (Bilbao); 1992, Gian Paolo Sanzogno (Madrid)
17	Gaetano Donizetti	Lucrezia Borgia	Gennaro	1966, Jonel Perlea; 1979, Gabriele Ferro; 1980, Richard Bonynge; 1989, Richard Bonynge (Madrid); 1989, Richard Bonynge (Paris)
18	Gaetano Donizetti	L'elisir d'amore	Nemorino	1967, Giuseppe Patanè; 1968, Fausto Cleva; 1984, Gianluigi Gelmetti
19	Gaetano Donizetti	Linda di Chamounix	Carlo	1972, Gianandrea Gavazzeni; 1975, Bruno Bartoletti
20	Gaetano Donizetti	La fille du régiment	Tonio	1973, Richard Bonynge; 1975, Nino Sanzogno; 1983, Richard Bonynge; 1984, Angelo Campori; 1986, Bruno Campanella
21	Charles Gounod	Faust	Faust	1963, Alain Guingal; 1967, Anton Guadagno; 1969, Danilo Belardinelli; 1973, Paul Ethuin; 1977, Peter Maag; 1977, Georges Prêtre; 1979, Georges Prêtre; 1983, Charles Dutoit; 1986, Alain Guingal
22	Charles Gounod	Roméo et Juliette	Roméo	1981, Jean Fournet; 1982, Robin Stapleton; 1983, Michel Plasson; 1985, Alain Guingal; 1986, Plácido Domingo
23	Jacinto Guerrero	El huésped del sevillano	Juan Luis	1966, Enrique García Asensio
24	Franz Lehár	Eva	Octavio Flaubert	1959, Enrique Estela
25	Jules Massenet	Werther	Werther	1966, Francesco Cristofori; 1971, Antonio Votto; 1971, Jean Fournet; 1975, Nicola Rescigno; 1976, Georges Prêtre; 1978, Georges Prêtre; 1978, Reynald Giovaninetti; 1979, Richard Bonynge; 1979, Michel Plasson; 1981, Fabiano Monica; 1984, Georges Prêtre; 1987, Alain Guingal; 1988, Jean Fournet; 1990, Gian Paolo Sanzogno; 1991, Michelangelo Veltri
26	Jules Massenet	Manon	Le Chevalier des Grieux	1973, Jean Fournet; 1977, Reynald Giovaninetti; 1981, Daniel Oren; 1982, Michel Plasson; 1983, Julius Rudel
27	Wolfgang Amadeus Mozart	Così fan tutte	Ferrando	1962, Karl Böhm
28	Wolfgang Amadeus Mozart	Don Giovanni	Don Ottavio	1964, Josef Krips; 1967, Karl Böhm; 1968, Herbert von Karajan; 1969, Ferdinand Leitner; 1970, Carlo Maria Giulini
29	Jacques Offenbach	Les contes d'Hoffmann	Hoffmann	1975, Nicola Rescigno; 1980, Ralf Weikert; 1980, Niksa Bareza; 1982, Bruno Bartoletti; 1988, Alain Guingal
30	Giacomo Puccini	La bohème	Rodolfo	1979, James Levine
31	Maurice Ravel	L'heure espagnole	Gonzalve	1965, Jean Fournet
32	Gioacchino Rossini	Il barbiere di Siviglia	Il Conte Almaviva	1958, Vincenzo Bellezza; 1968, Nino Sanzogno
33	José Serrano Simeón	Los de Aragón	Agustin	196?, Enrique García Asensio
34	José Serrano Simeón	La dolorosa	Rafael	196?, Enrique García Asensio
35	Pablo Sorozábal	Katiuska	Prince Sergio	1957, Pablo Sorozábal
36	Pablo Sorozábal	Black, el payaso	Carlos Dupont	1958, Pablo Sorozábal
37	Pablo Sorozábal	La tabernera del puerto	Leandro	1958, Pablo Sorozábal
38	Giuseppe Verdi	La traviata	Alfredo Germont	1958, Franco Ghione; 1970, Richard Bonynge; 1970, Aldo Ceccato; 1974, Richard Bonynge; 1975, Bruno Bartoletti; 1975, Richard Bonynge; 1976, Thomas Schippers; 1977, Jacques Delacôte; 1979, Carlo Franci; 1980, Riccardo Muti; 1992, Zubin Mehta
39	Giuseppe Verdi	Rigoletto	Il Duca di Mantova	1960, Gianandrea Gavazzeni; 1961, Francesco Molinari-Pradelli; 1963, Georg Solti; 1966, Francesco Molinari-Pradelli; 1972, Giuseppe Patanè; 1975, Gianfranco Rivoli; 1976, Riccardo Chailly; 1976, Mark Elder ( London); 1978, Giuseppe Patanè; 1978, Julius Rudel; 1980, Lamberto Gardelli; 1982, Ralf Weikert; 1987, Romano Gandolfi; 1987, Angelo Campori; 1989, José Collado
40	Giuseppe Verdi	Falstaff	Fenton	1963, Georg Solti
41	Amadeo Vives	Doña Francisquita	Fernando	1956, Daniel Montorio; 1972, Enrique García Asensio; 1988, Maximiniano Valdés; 1993, Antoni Ros Marbà
42	Amadeo Vives	La generala	Fernando	1959, Enrique Estela
43	Amadeo Vives	Bohemios	Roberto	197?, Enrique García Asensio
