= Gitano (album) =

Studio album by Rolando Villazón
- Released: February 2007
- Genre: Zarzuela
- Label: Virgin Classics

Rolando Villazón chronology
Monteverdi: Il Combattimento (2006)	Gitano (2007)	Duets (2007)

Gitano is a 2007 album of zarzuela arias sung by tenor Rolando Villazón, with the Orquesta de la Comunidad de Madrid conducted by Plácido Domingo, for Virgin Classics.

== Track listing ==
- "Por el humo se sabe dónde está el fuego" from Doña Francisquita by Amadeu Vives, libretto Federico Romero, Guillermo Fernández Shaw
- "Bella enamorada" from El último romántico (1928) Reveriano Soutullo, Juan Vert, libretto José Tellaeche
- "Raquel" from El huésped del Sevillano (1926) Jacinto Guerrero lyrics Enrique Reoyo, Juan Ignacio Luca de Tena
- "De este apacible rincón de Madrid" from Luisa Fernanda (1932) Federico Moreno Torroba, lyrics Federico Romero, Guillermo Fernández Shaw
- "Pajarin, tú que vuelas" from La pícara molinera (1928) Pablo Luna, lyrics Pilar Monterde, Eulalia Fernández Galván, Ángel Torres del Álamo, Antonio Asenjo Pérez
- "Canción guajira" from La alegría del batallón (1909) José Serrano Carlos Arniches, Félix Quintana
- "La roca fría del Calvario" from La dolorosa (1930) José Serrano Juan José Lorente
- "Madrileña bonita" from La del manojo de rosas (1934) Pablo Sorozábal Anselmo Cuadrado Carreño, Francisco Ramos de Castro
- "No puede ser" from La tabernera del puerto (1936) Pablo Sorozábal Federico Romero, Guillermo Fernández Shaw
- "Ya mis horas felices" from La del soto del Parral (1927) Reveriano Soutullo, Juan Vert Luis Fernández de Sevilla, Anselmo Cuadrado Carreño
- "Suena guitarrico mío" - Jota de Perico from El guitarrico (1900) Agustín Pérez Soriano Manuel Fernández de la Puente, Luis Pascual Frutos
- "Mi aldea" from Los gavilanes (1923) Jacinto Guerrero José Ramos Martín
- Jota - "Te quiero, morena" from El trust de los tenorios (1910) José Serrano Carlos Arniches, Enrique García Álvarez
- "Amor, vida de mi vida" from Maravilla (1941) Federico Moreno Torroba Antonio Quintero, Jesús María Arozamena
- "Un gitano sin su honor" from Luna (1998) José María Cano music and lyrics

== Chart positions ==
Chart	Peak position
Austria	38
Belgium (Wallonia)	88
France	24
Germany	50
