= José Bros =

Spanish singer (born 1966)

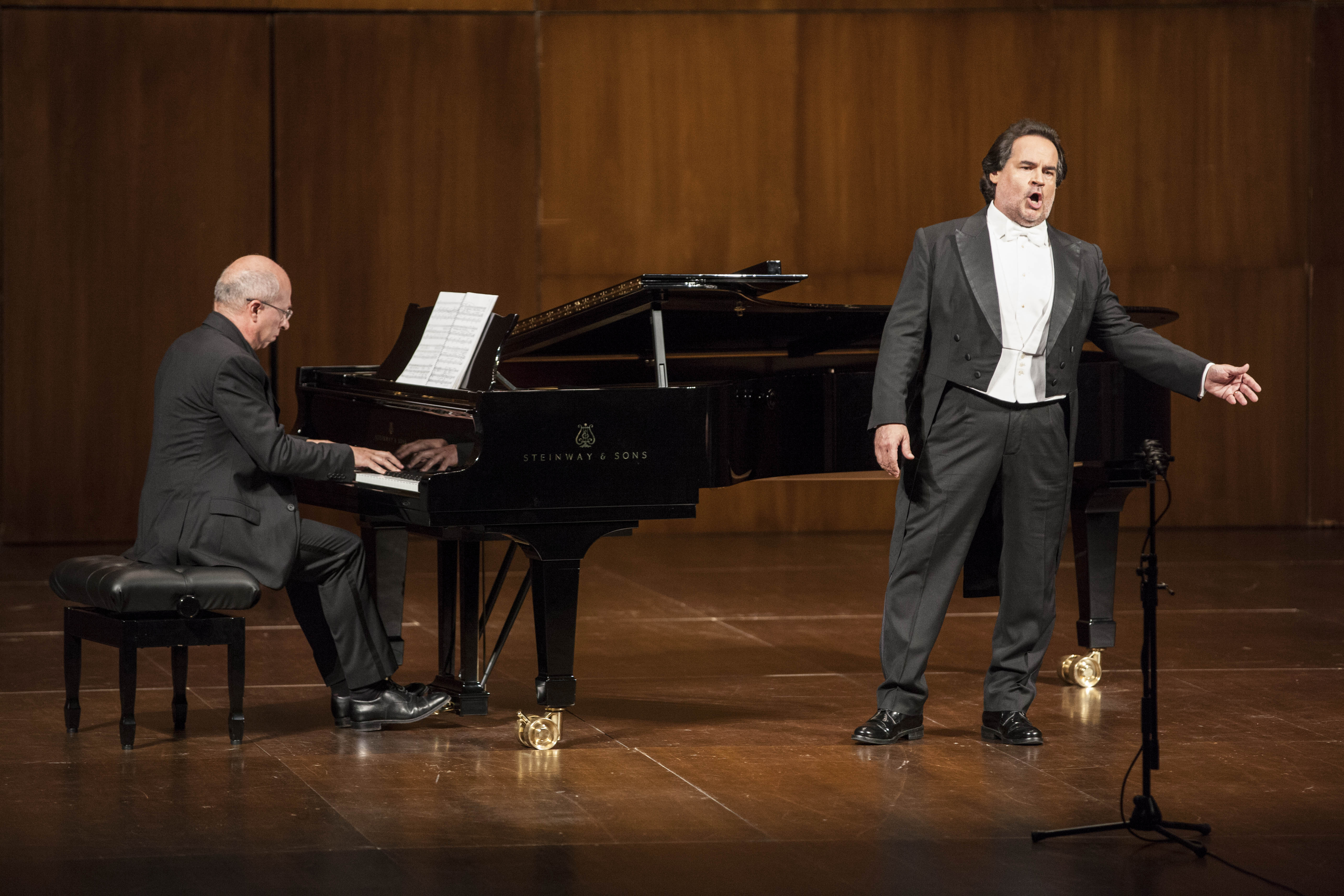
- Bros performing in 2015
- Born: Josep Bros i Jiménez; 1966; Barcelona, Spain
- Occupation: opera singer (tenor)
- Years active: 1987 – present
- Spouse: María Gallego

Josep Bros i Jiménez (born 1966) (Note: The Gran Enciclopèdia Catalana gives his birth year as 1966. However, it has also been reported as 1967, 1965, and 1960.) and primarily performing under the name José Bros, is a Catalan operatic tenor particularly known for his performances in the bel canto repertoire both on stage and in full-length opera recordings.

== Life and career ==
Bros was born in Barcelona and studied at the Conservatori Superior de Música del Liceu under Jaime Francisco Puig. He won one of the special prizes in the Francisco Viñas Singing Competition in 1986 and made his debut the following year in Palma de Mallorca as the tenor soloist in Carmina Burana. His operatic debut came on 15 November 1991 in Sabadell when he appeared as Don Ottavio in Don Giovanni. Between 1991 and 1992 he sang in small provincial theatres in Catalonia where his roles included the Duke of Mantua in Rigoletto, Fernando in La favorita and Nadir in Les pêcheurs de perles.

The major breakthrough in his career and his debut at Barcelona's Gran Teatre del Liceu came unexpectedly on 9 November 1992 when on 12-hours notice he substituted for the ailing tenor Fernando de la Mora in the opening night of Anna Bolena starring Edita Gruberova. His performance as Riccardo Percy caused a sensation and opened the doors to an international career. During the 1990s he made his house debuts in most of the leading opera houses of Europe, including the Teatro Regio di Parma as the Duke in Rigoletto (1994); Teatro de São Carlos in Lisbon as Fenton in Falstaff (1994); Vienna Staatsoper as Nemorino in L'elisir d'amore (1995); Teatro San Carlo in Naples as Edgardo in Lucia di Lammermoor (1996); Royal Opera House in London as Nemorino in L'elisir d'amore (1997); and La Scala Milan as Edgardo in Lucia di Lammermoor (1997)

By 2012, Bros had sung 60 roles on the opera stage and in recordings. Although his repertoire has largely concentrated on the bel canto operas of Donizetti and Bellini, in the later years of his career he has sung Alfredo in La traviata, Gabriele Adorno in Simon Boccanegra, Rodolfo in La bohème, and the title role in Massenet's Werther. He first sang Werther at the Teatro San Carlos in 2007 and reprised the role at the Liceu in 2017 in a new production directed by Willy Decker.

Bros has also championed zarzuelas and neglected operas by Spanish composers. He has sung the leading tenor roles in Doña Francisquita, Luisa Fernanda, La tabernera del puerto, and Ruperto Chapí's La bruja and has recorded Emilio Arrieta's Ildegonda and La conquista di Granata. In 2005 Bros and his wife, the soprano María Gallego, gave a concert of zarzuela arias and duets at the Teatro Real Coliseo de Carlos III in Madrid which was subsequently released on CD under the title Por Amor.

María Gallego and José Bros met when they were both students at the conservatory in Barcelona. She made her debut in 1986 in Rossini's Armida and appeared for several seasons at the Liceu and in the opera houses of Italy and Germany. After their marriage she retired from the operatic stage. The couple have two children.

== Recordings ==
Bros's full-length opera recordings include:

- Donizetti: Roberto Devereux – Nelly Miricioiu (Elisabetta), Sonia Ganassi (Sara), Jose Bros (Roberto Devereux), Roberto Frontali (Nottingham); Royal Opera House Orchestra and Chorus, Maurizio Benini (conductor). Recorded live at concert performances in the Royal Opera House in July 2002, released on CD in 2003 Label:Opera Rara
- Verdi: La traviata – Norah Amsellem (Violetta Valéry), José Bros (Alfredo Germont), Renato Bruson (Giorgio Germont), Itxaro Mentxaka (Flora Bervoix), María Espada (Annina); Chorus and Orchestra of the Teatro Real, Jesús López Cobos (conductor). Filmed in performance in 2005 for television broadcast, released on DVD in 2006. Label: Opus Arte
- Donizetti: Parisina – Nicola Alaimo (Azzo), José Bros (Ugo), Carmen Giannattasio (Parisina), Ann Taylor (Imelda); London Philharmonic Orchestra and Geoffrey Mitchell Choir, David Parry (conductor). Released on CD in 2008. Label: Opera Rara
