= Agustin Perez =

Agustin Perez may refer to:

- Agustin Pérez (bishop) (died 1286), Roman Catholic prelate
- Agustín Pérez (footballer) (born 1991), Argentine goalkeeper
- Agustín Pérez Soriano (1846–1907), Spanish composer
