= Miguel Roa =

Spanish conductor

Miguel Roa (Madrid, 1944 – Illescas, 2016) was a Spanish conductor. He was particularly associated with the zarzuela, and joined the Teatro de la Zarzuela in 1978, becoming director in 1985.

== Selected discography ==
- Tomás Bretón: Andalusian Scenes; In the Alhambra; Opera Preludes. Orquesta de la Comunidad de Madrid. Miguel Roa (Naxos, 2008)
- Joaquín Rodrigo: El hijo fingido. Comedia lírica en un prólogo y dos actos. Miguel Roa (2002)
- Preludes and Choruses from Zarzuelas (Naxos, 2003)
- Manuel Penella: El gato montés Teresa Berganza Plácido Domingo . Coro Titular Del Teatro Lírico Nacional la Zarzuela, Madrid Symphony Orchestra Miguel Roa (2CD DGG, 1998)
- Pasión española: coplas. Plácido Domingo, Orquesta de la Comunidad de Madrid. Miguel Roa (DGG, 2008)
- Amadeo Vives: Doña Francisquita, Ainhoa Arteta, Plácido Domingo, Linda Mirabal. Cordoba Grand Theatre Chorus, Seville Symphony Orchestra Miguel Roa
