= Gonzalo Grau y la Clave Secreta =

- Origin: Boston, Massachusetts, United States
- Genres: Afro Cuban
- Years active: 1998 – Present
- Members: Gonzalo Grau Alex Alvear; Ali Bello; Albert Leusink; Jose Ramirez; Dan Brantigan; Ernesto Diaz; Felipe Salles; Fausto Cuevas; Pablo Bencid; Robby Rosario; Johanna Castaneda; Tim Mayer; Shlomo Cohen; Panagiotis Andreou; Victor Mairena Omar Ladezma
- Website: www.gonzalograu.com

Gonzalo Grau y la Clave Secreta are a jazz band which originated in Boston, Massachusetts, United States.

== History ==
Gonzalo Grau was born in Caracas, Venezuela, the son of Alberto Grau and Isabel Palacios. He studied at the Berklee College of Music in Boston. He produced Osvaldo Golijov's La Pasión según San Marcos which won its nominated category at Germany's Echo Klassik Awards in 2010, and arranged several tracks on tenor Rolando Villazón's ¡México! which won an Echo Klassik award the following year. In 2011 Grau won the Young Euro Classic Composer Award, given in recognition of the best world premiere or German premiere at the festival, for his work Aqua.

Grau formed La Clave Secreta in Boston with musicians of various nationalities. The group have been described as mixing "Afro-Cuban styles like salsa and timba with subtle hints of funk and R&B". The band's album Frutero Moderno was nominated for Best Tropical Latin Album at the 51st Annual Grammy Awards in 2009. In addition to La Clave Secreta, Grau also fronts another band, Plural, which is based in Caracas.
