= No puede ser =

"No puede ser" (It cannot be) is an aria sung by Leandro (tenor) in the second act of the zarzuela, La tabernera del puerto, composed by Pablo Sorozábal to a libretto by Federico Romero and Guillermo Fernández-Shaw. La tabernera del puerto premiered in Barcelona in 1936. One of the most famous arias in the Spanish language, No puede ser has been part of the concert repertoire of many Spanish tenors, including Alfredo Kraus, José Carreras and Plácido Domingo who sang it in the 1990 Three Tenors concert.
