= Gitano =

Gitano may refer to:

- Romani people in Spain
- Gitano (album), a 2007 album by Rolando Villazón
- Gitano, a 2012 album by Canut Reyes
- Gitano Group Inc., a fashion apparel company, USA
- Gitanos F.C., a 19th-century English association football club
