= Guillermo Fernández-Shaw =

Spanish poet and journalist

- Fernández-Shaw c. 1945
- Born: Guillermo Fernández-Shaw Iturralde; 26 February 1893; Madrid, Spain
- Died: 17 August 1965 (aged 72); Madrid, Spain
- Occupations: poet, journalist

Guillermo Fernández-Shaw Iturralde (26 February 1893 - 17 August 1965) was a Spanish poet and journalist. He is particularly known as a writer of libretti, primarily for zarzuelas. With Federico Romero, he wrote the libretti for two of the best-known zarzuelas of the 20th century, Doña Francisquita by Amadeo Vives and Luisa Fernanda by Federico Moreno Torroba. His father, Carlos Fernández Shaw, was also a playwright, poet and journalist who wrote libretti for several zarzuelas and operas, most famously Margarita la tornera and La vida breve. Guillermo Fernández-Shaw was born in Cádiz and initially trained as a lawyer before becoming a journalist. He was the editor of the Spanish newspaper La Epoca from 1911 to 1936, and a contributor to ABC as well as writing poetry for Blanco y Negro. His partnership with Federico Romero began in 1916 with their libretto for Serrano's La canción del olvido. Guillermo Fernández-Shaw died in Madrid on 17 August 1965 at the age of 72.

== Libretti ==
Guillermo Fernández-Shaw wrote over 70 libretti in collaboration with Federico Romero, including:

- 1916. La canción del olvido by José Serrano
- 1923. Doña Francisquita by Amadeu Vives
- 1923. El dictador by Rafael Millán Picazo
- 1926. El caserío by Jesús Guridi
- 1927. La villana by Amadeu Vives
- 1928. La meiga by Jesús Guridi
- 1930. La rosa del azafrán by Jacinto Guerrero
- 1932. Luisa Fernanda by Federico Moreno Torroba
- 1934. La chulapona by Federico Moreno Torroba
- 1936. La tabernera del puerto by Pablo Sorozábal
- 1939. La malquerida by Conrado del Campo

In 1941 Guillermo worked with his brother Rafael Fernández Shaw on Torroba's Maria Manuela. Following Guillermo's feud with Federico Romero, which ultimately ended their artistic partnership, the two brothers then became regular collaborators, producing:

- 1947. Un día de primavera by Jesús Romo
- 1949. La duquesa del Candil by Jesús García Leoz
- 1951 La lola se va a los puertos by Ángel Barrios
- 1951. El canastillo de fresas by Jacinto Guerrero (Guerrero's last zarzuela)
- 1953. El gaitero de Gijón by Jesús Romo

== Sources ==
- López de Zuazo Algar, Antonio, Catálogo de periodistas españoles del siglo XX, Universidad Complutense, 1981.
- Manzanares, Pedro Gomez and Webber, Christopher, Federico Romero and Guillermo Fernández Shaw, Zarzuela!, October 2001.
