= Colegio de Nuestra Señora de los Infantes, Toledo =

School in Toledo, Castile-La Mancha, Spain

Coordinates: 39.8558°N 4.0226°W

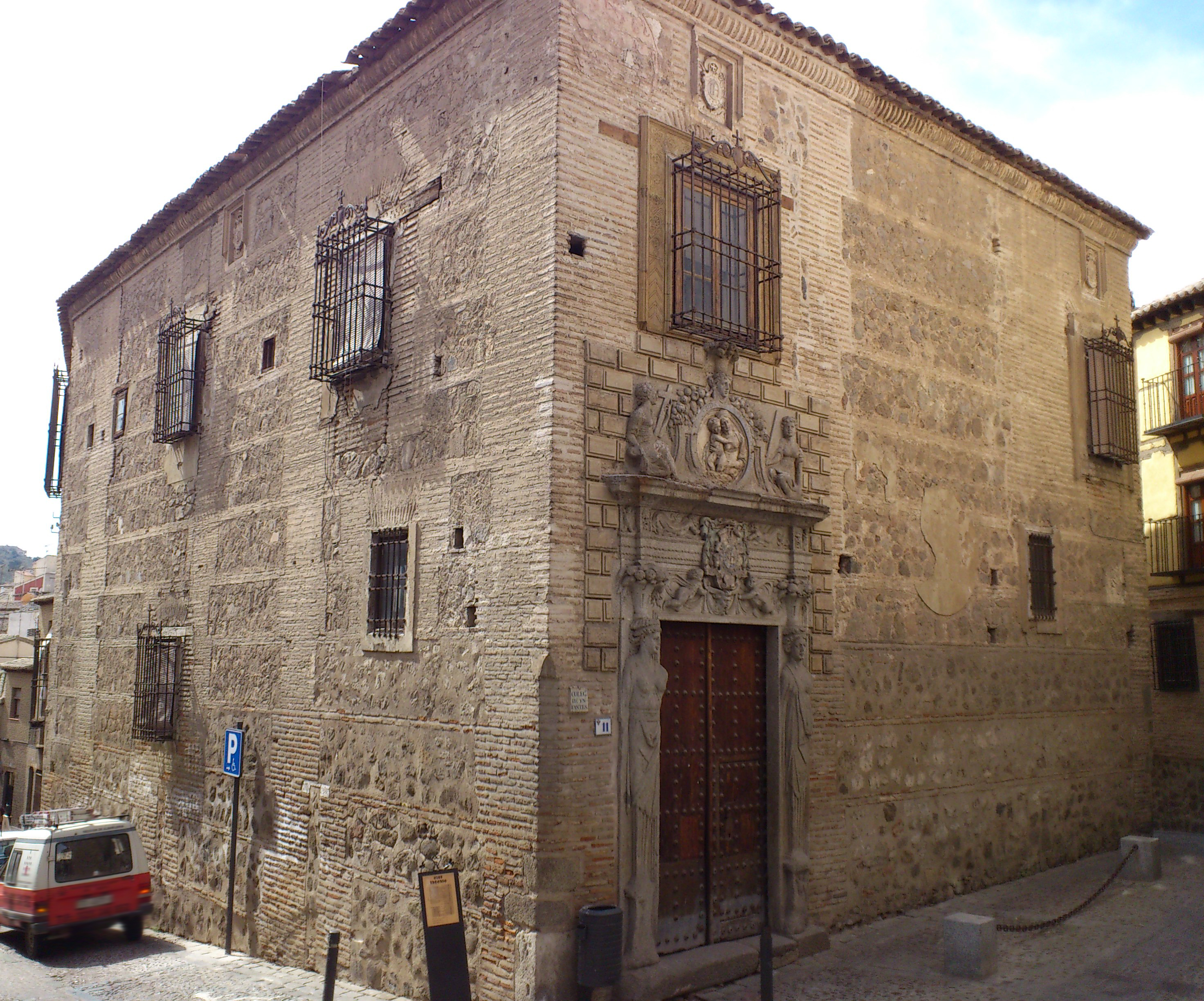
Overview of the building.

The Colegio de Nuestra Señora de los Infantes (College of Our Lady of the Infants) is a school in the city of Toledo (Castile-La Mancha, Spain). It was founded in the 16th century by Juan Martínez Silíceo, Archbishop of Toledo and later a cardinal, and was intended to provide a specialist musical education for the cathedral's young singers.

The original building is protected by the heritage listing Bien de Interes Cultural, but the school relocated in the 1980s.

== Educational aims ==
On July 22, 1552, Archbishop Silíceo founded the College of Our Lady of the Infants, whose purpose would be the integral formation of some children called “cleriçones” who sang and helped in the services of Cathedral of Toledo. There are previous news dating back to the 12th century of the services of some children in the Cathedral.

On May 9, 1557 the same Cardinal Archbishop signs the Constitutions by which that College will be governed. The Maestro de capilla, generally, and other teachers lived with the boys to supervise their development, which included, for a time, their incorporation into the Royal University of Toledo.

== Architecture ==
Completed in 1559, the College was the result of the remodeling of an existing property rather than a new building. The irregular plan is imposed by the adjacent streets and results in the building being freestanding.

The plan and execution of the work was carried out Don Francisco de Villalpando, also author of the screen of the main presbytery of the Cathedral; and very possibly its main master of works was Alonso de Covarrubias, given the great connection existing between the College and the Cathedral's cabildo.

== Alumni ==
In the 19th century, it was perhaps the most celebrated scholarships, the music master Guillermo Cerceda and Francisco Sanz, singer in the Music Chapel of the Royal Palace of Madrid, both natural of Toledo. In the 20th century, there was the former seise (chorister) and composer Jacinto Guerrero, to whom we are indebted for the music of such zarzuelas as "Los Gavilanes", El huésped del Sevillano and "La rosa del azafrán".

Also it is necessary to emphasize the figure of the former seise Saint Alonso de Orozco, patron of the Seises of Toledo.

== Present day ==
The college still exists as an educational institution, but in another location on Toledo's Avenida de Europa. It has about 1500 students between 1st year of infants and 2nd of baccalaureate.
