= Gianluca Martinenghi =

Italian Music Conductor

- Born: Milan, Italy
- Occupation: Conductor
- Years active: 1994-present

Gianluca Martinenghi is an Italian opera and symphonic music conductor. He is currently the Chief Conductor of the National Opera and Ballet in Skopje, North Macedonia, a position he previously held from 2016 to 2018.

== Early life ==
Gianluca Martinenghi used to learn piano and composition with Piero Rattalino and Bruno Bettinelli respectively. Accompanying with Donato Renzetti and Giacomo Zani, he began studying orchestral conducting later. In association with Teatro Massimo he worked as a conductor.

== Career ==
Martinenghi worked as a musicologist writer and was published at specialized magazines for piano review especially in Musica, Piano Time and Symphonia. At that time he began working in Teatro regio di torino as a répétiteur, that led him to the operatic repertoire, being an assistant to accomplished musicians for example Yuri Ahronovitch and Gianandrea Gavazzeni. In the first part of his career, he executed several symphonic concerts and contemporary 20th Century productions by Benjamin Britten and Hans Werner Henze. With his music direction, an Opera was staged at the Tbilisi Z. Paliashvili Opera and Ballet State Theatre in 2018. In 2012, Munich Radio Orchestra and L’Orchestre Symphonique de Montréal were two of his vital international orchestras. In 2013, he inaugurated the Taormina Festival with Rigoletto (broadcast worldwide) and in 2014 he inaugurated with Aida and the Orchestra of Teatro Bellini di Catania the Siracusa Festival.

Gianluca Martinenghi is known to be invited to conduct symphonic concerts, including Budapest’s Béla Bartók National Concert Hall, Hong Kong Philharmonic Orchestra, Munich Radio Orchestra, Ochestra Sinfonica dello Sferisterio di Macerata, Philharmonique de Monte-Carlo, la Suisse Romande, Festival Puccini in Torre del Lago, Carlo Felice di Genova, Toscanini di Parma, The National Hungarian Filarmomic Orchestra, Sinfonica de Malaga, Teatro Comunale di Modena, Orquesta del Teatro Colón, Sinfónica de Tenerife, Teatro Petruzzelli di Bari.

As an operatic conductor, Martinenghi has some notable performances in his career. Among them Croatian National Theatre, Deutsche Oper Berlin, Georgian National Theatre, Grand Theatre de Tours, Irish National Opera, Macedonian National Theatre, NCPA of Beijing, Palm Beach Opera, Seoul Opera Center, Tokyo Bunka Kaikan, Teatro Lirico di Cagliari, Slovenian National Theatre, Sydney Opera House, Teatro Bellini di Catania, Comunale di Bologna, dell'Opera di Roma, Verona Arena and Teatro Donizetti di Bergamo.

== Accolades and nominations ==
Gianluca Martinenghi was nominated Principal Guest Conductor to the Tenerife Opera Festival between 2009 and 2011, and Chief Conductor of Macedonian Opera Theatre from 2016 until 2018. In January 2023 he was nominated Artistic Secretary of Teatro Reggio in Turin, Italy,

== Discography ==
- "L'arca di Noè" Benjamin Britten, Fondazione Teatro Massimo Palermo, 2002
- "Duetti Verdiani" Amarilli Nizza- Roberto Frontali, Orchestra del Teatro di Slesia e Moravia "A.Dvorak, 2010
- "Amarilli Nizza Puccini"- Orchestra of the Dvorak Theatre of Ostrava, 2008
- "This is my Verdi"- Amarilli Nizza, Janacek Philharmonic Orchestra, 2015
- "Gianluca Terranova canta Caruso" Orchestra Fondazione Arena di Verona, 2012
