= Halffter =

Halffter is a surname. Notable people with the surname include:

- Rodolfo Halffter (1900–1987), Spanish composer, brother of Ernesto
- Ernesto Halffter (1905–1989), Spanish composer
- Cristóbal Halffter (1930–2021), Spanish composer, father of Pedro
- Pedro Halffter Caro (born 1971), Spanish conductor and composer
