= Federico Romero =

Spanish poet and essayist

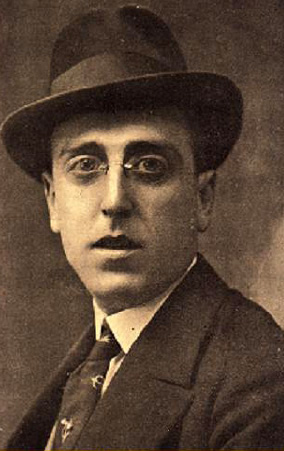
Federico Romero c. 1917

Federico Romero Saráchaga (11 November 1886 – 30 June 1976) was a Spanish poet and essayist. He is particularly known as a writer of libretti, primarily for zarzuelas. Although he was born in Oviedo and lived at times in both Zaragoza and Madrid, he considered himself a son of Spain's La Mancha region, where his family had lived from the early 20th century in the small town of La Solana (Ciudad Real). The zarzuela La rosa del azafrán, composed by Jacinto Guerrero to a libretto by Romero, is considered emblematic of the region.

== Biography ==
Romero was born in Oviedo to a well-to-do family. His father was an official with the Banco de España, and his aunt owned a large hacienda in La Mancha. He originally trained and worked as a mining engineer. After suffering from health problems caused by his years in the mines, he took up a post with the Spanish Post Office in Madrid where he worked as a telegraphist from 1907 until 1917. During that time he also began his writing career, and in 1911, published a long poem, Nochebuena en la Central in the magazine El Telegrafista Español. Romero had been a close friend of the Spanish writer Carlos Fernández-Shaw, and after his death formed a writing partnership with his son, Guillermo Fernández-Shaw, which was to produce over 70 libretti including those for two of the best-known zarzuelas of the 20th century, Doña Francisquita by Amadeo Vives and Luisa Fernanda by Federico Moreno Torroba. The first libretto they wrote together was for the 1916 zarzuela, La canción del olvido by José Serrano. A year after its triumphal premiere, Romero gave up his job as a telegraphist to become a full-time writer. However, he continued to maintain ties with his former colleagues, contributing articles and poems to their magazines, El Telégrafo Español and El Electricista, into the 1930s. In 1943, he performed at the celebrations for the 88th anniversary of the Spanish Telegraph Service with two other telegraphists who also became zarzuela librettists, Pedro Llabrés and Francisco Prada.

In the course of their 30-year collaboration, Romero and Fernández-Shaw wrote libretti for virtually every Spanish lyric composer of the day. Although most of their libretti were original stories, several of them were based on works by Spanish playwrights such as Lope de Vega, Manuel Machado, and Jacinto Benavente. They also produced Spanish versions of stage plays by Goethe, Schiller, and Rostand. Romero's partnership with Fernández-Shaw ended in the late 1940s following a personal feud, after which Romero wrote libretti on his own, while Fernández-Shaw began a new partnership with his brother Rafael.

Romero was one of the founders of the Sociedad General de Autores y Editores (SGAE) and served as a counselor to the organization. He was also a founding member of the Instituto de Estudios Madrileños and published several monographs on the history of Madrid including Por la calle de Alcalá (1953), Prehistoria de la gran vía (1966), and Mesonero Romanos, activista del madrileñismo (1968). Federico Romero died in Madrid on 30 June 1976 at the age of 89 and was buried in the Cementerio de la Almudena. A primary school and one of the central streets in his boyhood hometown of La Solana are named in his honour. In 1982, the SGAE established the "Premio Federico Romero" which is awarded annually to a distinguished zarzuela singer.

== Family ==
Romero married his cousin, Carmen Sanchez Saráchaga (born in Ciudad Real). They had a daughter named Marjuela.

== Libretti ==
Although the vast majority of Romero's libretti were written with Guillermo Fernández-Shaw, he also collaborated with other librettists, most notably with José Tellaeche for Pablo Luna's 1941 zarzuela, Calatravas. He also wrote several libretti on his own, including those for Ernesto Rosillo's 1922 revue, La rubia del Far-West, and Juan Dotras Vila's 1952 zarzuela, Aquella canción Antigua. The libretti written with Guillermo Fernández-Shaw include:

- 1916. La canción del olvido by José Serrano
- 1923. Doña Francisquita by Amadeu Vives
- 1923. El dictador by Rafael Millán Picazo
- 1926. El caserío by Jesús Guridi
- 1927. La villana by Amadeu Vives
- 1928. La meiga by Jesús Guridi
- 1930. La rosa del azafrán by Jacinto Guerrero
- 1932. Luisa Fernanda by Federico Moreno Torroba
- 1933. La labradora by Leopoldo Magenti
- 1934. La chulapona by Federico Moreno Torroba
- 1936. La tabernera del puerto by Pablo Sorozábal
- 1939. La malquerida by Conrado del Campo
- 1943. Loza Lozana by Jacinto Guerrero
- 1944. Peñamariana by Jesús Guridi

== Sources ==
- El País, Falleció Federico Romero, autor de "Doña Francisquita", 1 July 1976. Accessed 24 June 2009.
- Fernández Álvarez, Diego Emilio, Luisa Fernanda, 2007. (The article's main sources are Diccionario de la Zarzuela ISBN 84-89457-30-1; El libro de la zarzuela ISBN 84-231-2677-3; and Historia de la zarzuela, Vol. II ISBN 84-85680-01-4.) Accessed 24 June 2009.
- García-Cervigón, A., El poeta Federico Romero da nombre al nuevo colegio de La Solana, La Tribuna (Ciudad Real), 4 March 2009. Accessed 24 June 2009.
- Hennessey, Mike, CISAC Goes Gold: Spain, Billboard Magazine, 6 November 1976. Accessed 24 June 2009.
- La Vanguardia, Ha fallecido don Guillermo Fernández Shaw, director de la Sociedad General de Autores, 18 August 1965, p. 5. Accessed 24 June 2009.
- La Vanguardia, Entíerro de Federico Romero, 3 July 1976, p. 46.
- Manzanares, Pedro Gomez and Webber, Christopher, Federico Romero and Guillermo Fernández Shaw, Zarzuela!, October 2001. Accessed 24 June 2009.
- Olivé, Sebastián, Historias de Telégrafos, Asociación de Amigos del Telégrafo de España, 2009 pp. 183–185. Accessed 24 June 2009.
- Sadie, Stanley (ed.), The New Grove Dictionary of Opera, Grove's Dictionaries of Music, 1992. ISBN 0-935859-92-6
- Sociedad General de Autores y Editores, El tenor catalán José Bros logra el Premio Federico Romero 2007 de la SGAE, 14 December 2007. Accessed 24 June 2009.
