= Norah Amsellem =

French opera singer

- Born: 1970 (age 55–56); Paris, France
- Occupation: opera singer (soprano)
- Years active: 1994 – present

Norah Amsellem (born 1970) is a French opera singer who has appeared in leading soprano roles in both North America, Europe, Asia since her debut in 1995. Her discography of complete opera recordings includes Carmen (as Micaela) for Decca, La traviata (as Violetta) for Opus Arte, and La bohème (as Mimì) for Telarc.

== Life and career ==
Amsellem was born in Paris in 1970. She began her musical education there, singing at the choir school of Maîtrise de Radio France as well as studying harp and piano. She then went to the United States to study under Dalton Baldwin at Westminster Choir College in Princeton, New Jersey. She also took singing classes with Lorraine Nubar at Juilliard. Amsellem graduated from Westminster in 1994, and that same year at 19 years old, she was one of the youngest winners of the Metropolitan Opera National Council Auditions unanimous vote. She first appeared at the Met in March 1995 in a minor role in Idomeneo while a member of their Lindemann Young Artist Program, and made her official debut in October 1995 as in Micaela in Carmen. She went on to sing at the Met 30 more times between 1995 and 2007 in roles including Liù in Turandot and Gilda in Rigoletto.

In the 1990s, she also made a number of European house debuts. These included performing as Michaela at the Opéra Bastille and as Countess Almaviva in The Marriage of Figaro at Glyndebourne in 1997 and in the title role of Manon at La Scala in 1999. Amsellem made both her role debut as Violetta in La traviata and her house debut at the Teatro Real in Madrid in October 2003 when she replaced Angela Gheorghiu in a new production of the opera by Pier Luigi Pizzi which updated the setting to Paris during the Nazi occupation. Amsellem, who had been in the second cast replaced Georghiu at the premiere. According to La Razon, her performance was "a triumph". She has gone on to sing Violetta multiple times including at the Deutsche Oper Berlin in 2004, the Royal Opera House in London in 2005 and 2008, the Teatro Comunale in Bologna in 2005, the Vienna Staatsoper in 2006 and 2007, the Carlo Felice in Genoa in 2010, and at the Cincinnati Opera in 2018. Amsellem also returned to the Teatro Real in 2005 to reprise her Violetta in the Pizzi production. That performance was filmed for broadcast on Spanish television and later released on DVD and won a Gramophone award.

Among the later roles which Amsellem has added to her repertoire are Matilde in Guillaume Tell (Accademia Nazionale di Santa Cecilia, 2007); Elvira in I puritani (Seattle Opera, 2008); Olympia, Antonia, and Giulietta in The Tales of Hoffmann (Seattle Opera, 2014). Marguerite in Faust (Las Palmas Opera Festival, 2015); and Nedda in Pagliacci (Teatro de São Carlos, 2017).

== Recordings ==
- Bizet: Carmen – Anna Caterina Antonacci (Carmen), Norah Amsellem (Micaëla), Jonas Kaufmann (Don José), Ildebrando D'Arcangelo (Escamillo); Orchestra and Chorus of the Royal Opera House, Antonio Pappano (conductor). Filmed at the Royal Opera House in 2006, released on DVD in 2008. Label: Decca
- Puccini: La bohème – Norah Amsellem (Mimì), Marcus Haddock (Rodolfo), Georgia Jarman (Musetta), Fabio Capitanucci (Marcello), Christopher Schaldenbrand (Schaunard), Denis Sedov (Colline), Kevin Glavin (Benoit); Atlanta Symphony Orchestra and Chorus, Robert Spano (conductor). Recorded live at Woodruff Arts Center, Atlanta in 2007, released on CD in 2008. Label: Telarc.
- Verdi: La traviata – Norah Amsellem (Violetta Valéry), José Bros (Alfredo Germont), Renato Bruson (Giorgio Germont), Itxaro Mentxaka (Flora Bervoix), María Espada (Annina); Chorus and Orchestra of the Teatro Real, Jesús López Cobos (conductor). Filmed in performance in 2005 for television broadcast, released on DVD in 2006. Label: Opus Arte
