= Juan Dotras Vila =

Joan Dotras i Vila (4 November 1900, in Barcelona – 15 July 1978, in Canet de Mar, Spanish: Juan Dotras Vila) was a Catalan composer and pedagogue. He was best known as a zarzuela composer. He taught at the Escuela Municipal de Música and the Liceo in Barcelona.

== Works ==
=== Zarzuelas ===
- Kosmópolis: zarzuela en forma de magazine musical circense (1928)
- Romanza húngara: poema lírico en tres actos (1937)
- El caballero del amor (1939)
- La chica del topolino (1941)
- Verónica (1942)
- Aquella canción antigua (1952) libretto Federico Romero
