= Los amores de la Inés =

- Zarzuela by Manuel de Falla
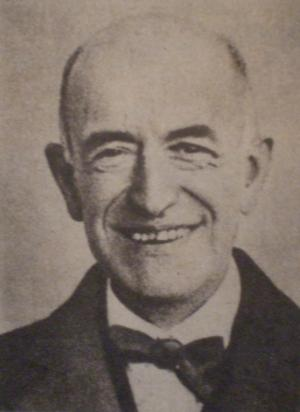
- The composer in 1919
- Translation: The Loves of Inés
- Librettist: Emilio Dugi
- Language: Spanish
- Premiere: 12 April 1902; Teatro Cómico, Madrid

Los amores de la Inés (The Loves of Inés) is a zarzuela in one act, two scenes, composed by Manuel de Falla in collaboration with Amadeu Vives. The work uses a Spanish language libretto by Emilio Dugi (Mannel Osorio y Bertrand) and the music is organized into a prelude and five musical sections.

The zarzuela was premiered at the Teatro Cómico in Madrid on 12 April 1902. It was the only example of de Falla's five zarzuelas to be actually produced. It has been performed again in 2013, at the Teatro de la Zarzuela, Madrid.

== Roles ==
Role	Voice type	Premiere Cast, 12 April 1902 (Conductor: )
Inés	soprano	Loreto Prado
Lucas	tenor	Enrique Chicote
Juan	baritone	Redondo, ten. (note: not the baritone Marcos Redondo)
Felipa	spoken	Castellanos
Fatigas	spoken	Nart
Rata Sabia	spoken	Ponzano
La Blasa	spoken	Jovita Fuentes
Moreno	spoken	Léon
Araña	spoken	Sinesio Delgado
Pesqui/Mozo	spoken	Borda
