= Teatro de la Maestranza =

Opera house in Seville, Spain

Coordinates: 37.3838°N 5.9971°W

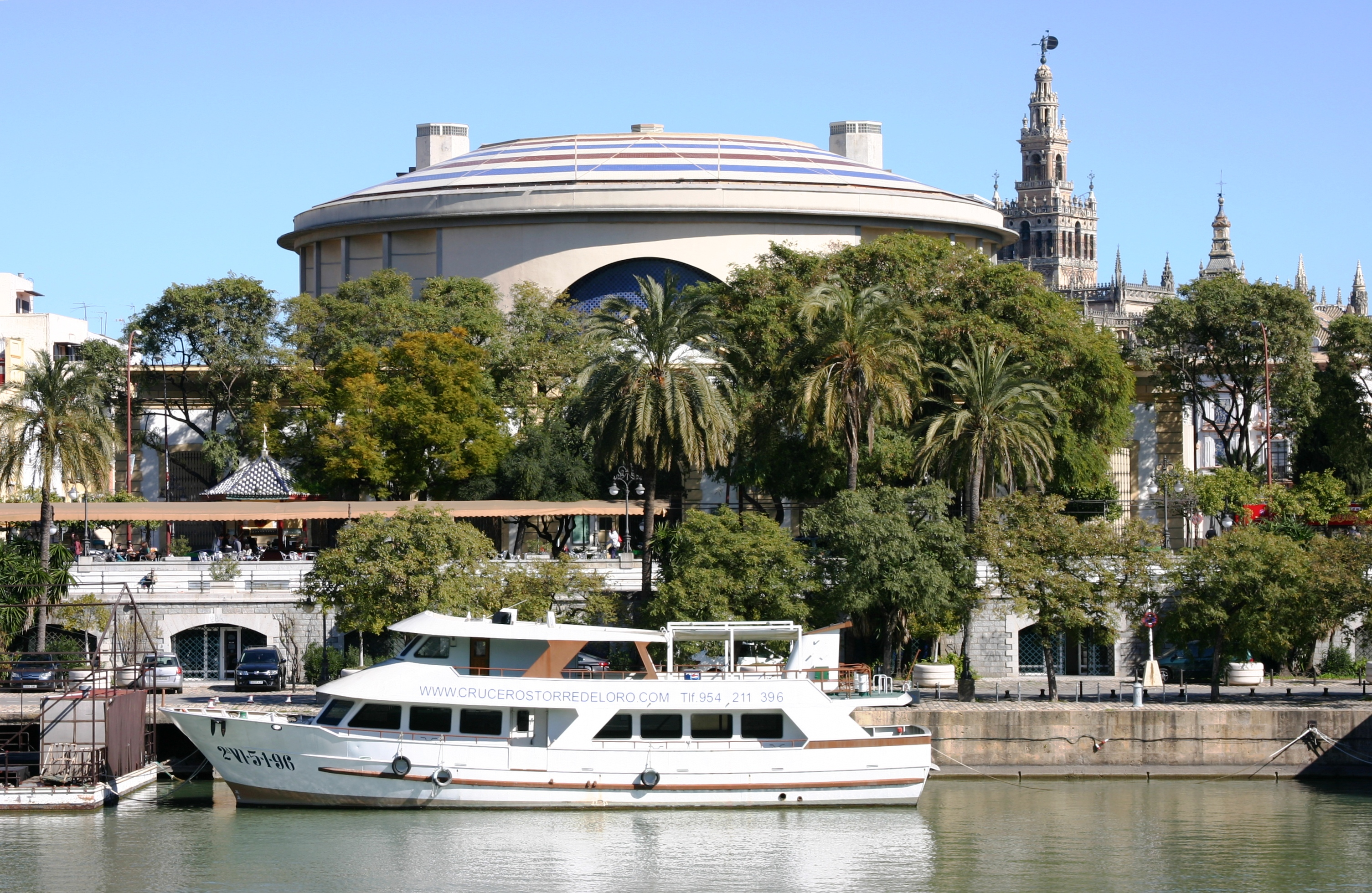
- Interactive map of Teatro de la Maestranza
- Address: Paseo de Colón 22; Seville; Spain
- Capacity: 1,800
- Type: Opera House

Construction
- Opened: 1991
- Years active: 1991 -
- Architects: Aurelio del Pozo and Luis Marín

Website
- www.teatrodelamaestranza.es

The Teatro de la Maestranza is an opera house located in Seville, Spain.

The theatre was conceived to be one of the main cultural venues of the Seville Expo '92, and the first performance took place in 1991, shortly before the inauguration of the Universal Exposition. The theatre was refurbished in 2005.

Although the Teatro de la Maestranza is mainly devoted to opera, there are also performances of Zarzuela (Spanish operetta) and other musical performances.

The resident orchestra is the Royal Seville Symphony Orchestra (ROSS), and the artistic director is Pedro Halffter. The theatre is the ROSS' main concert venue and the home of the Choir of the Friends' Society of the Maestranza Theatre.

On 16 July 1992, during a rehearsal at the Teatro de la Maestranza for a performance by the Opéra national de Paris of Verdi's Otello, a suspended platform which formed part of the scenery collapsed onto the stage, killing a female member of the chorus and injuring a further 41 people, several of them seriously.

To mark the 150th anniversary of the premiere of Carmen, set in the city, Emilio Sagi mounted a new production at the theatre, which is situated close to locations of the opera (the buill-ring, cigarette factory and city walls).
