= Francesco Molinari-Pradelli =

Italian opera conductor (1911–1996)

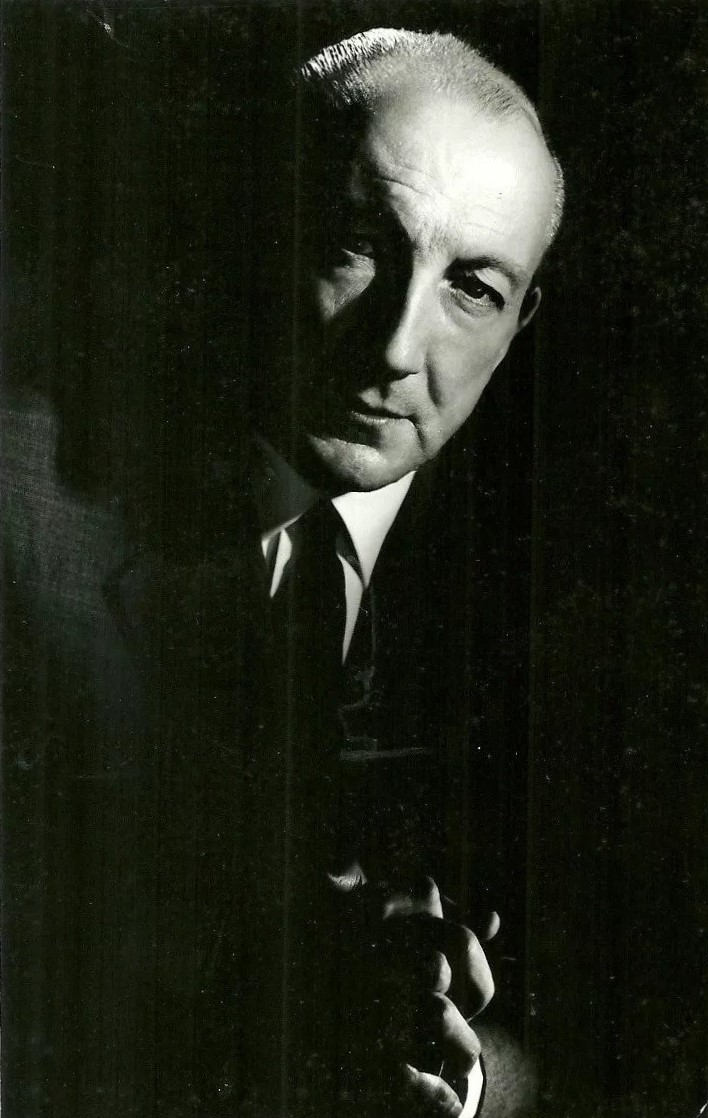
Francesco Molinari-Pradelli by Annemarie Heinrich

Francesco Molinari-Pradelli (4 July 1911 – 8 August 1996) was a prominent Italian opera conductor.

He studied piano and composition at Bologna and graduated from the Accademia di Santa Cecilia, Rome, in 1938. He made his debut at La Scala in 1946 and his Covent Garden debut in 1955.

Francesco Molinari Pradelli, 1952

Between 1966 and 1973, he was active as a conductor at the Metropolitan Opera, specializing in the Italian repertoire, especially Verdi and Puccini, but also making a rare foray into the French repertoire with Gounod's Roméo et Juliette. His account of Puccini's Turandot with Birgit Nilsson and Franco Corelli is commonly regarded as one of the greatest recordings of that work.

He was an academician of Santa Cecilia and also known as a collector of pictorial art, especially from the 16th to 18th centuries: he purchased numerous paintings during his frequent business trips. Internationally known, the Molinari Pradelli collection is the most significant formed in Bologna in the twentieth century and is notable for the consistency and selected quality of the works.

In December 2013, the walking area behind the Teatro Comunale in Bologna, between Largo Respighi and the Giardini del Guasto, was named Piazzetta Francesco Molinari Pradelli.

In 1942, he conducted his friend Carlo Felice Cillario in some violin concerts in Odessa and, the following year, convinced him to dedicate himself entirely to a career as a conductor after he broke his wrist.

Molinari-Pradelli died in Bologna, Italy, the city of his birth.

== Discography ==
- Giuseppe Verdi: Simon Boccanegra - (Cetra, 1951)
- Friedrich von Flotow: Martha - (Cetra, 1953)
- Jules Massenet: Werther - (Cetra, 1953)
- Giuseppe Verdi: La traviata - (Decca, 1954)
- Giacomo Puccini: Manon Lescaut - (Decca, 1954)
- Gaetano Donizetti: L'elisir d'amore - (Decca, 1955)
- Giuseppe Verdi: La forza del destino - (Decca, 1955)
- Giacomo Puccini: Tosca - (Decca, 1959)
- The Art of the Prima Donna: "Joan Sutherland" - (Decca, 1960)
- Giacomo Puccini: Turandot - (EMI, 1965)
- Giacomo Puccini: La rondine - (RCA, 1966)
