= Argeo Quadri =

- Argeo Quadri (photo with 1951 dedication)
- Occupation: conductor

Argeo Quadri (23 March 1911 – 14 April 2004) was an Italian conductor best known for his work with Italian and French opera. From 1957 he was largely resident at the Vienna State Opera. A native of Como, he graduated from the Milan Conservatory in 1933.

== Biography ==
Quadri was born in Como on 23 March 1911. He graduated from the Milan Conservatory in 1933. He conducted a range of operas, including Verdi's Rigoletto and Ballo in maschera at Covent Garden in the mid-1950s. From 1957, he was largely resident at the Vienna State Opera. He died on 14 April 2004 in Milan.
