= ¡México! =

Studio album by Rolando Villazón
- Released: 2010
- Label: DG

Rolando Villazón chronology
Georg Friedrich Händel (2009)	¡México! (2010)	Messiah (2016)

¡México! is a 2010 album of Mexican standards sung by Rolando Villazón with the UK-based Bolívar Soloists and released on DG. Arrangements for chamber ensemble were made by the Venezuelan musician, Gonzalo Grau, leader of the timba band, La Clavé Secreta, and the Venezuelan flautist and composer Efraín Oscher.

== Track listing ==
- Medley of Cielito lindo/Mexico lindo y querido arranged by Gonzalo Grau
- Roberto Cantoral (1935–2010) El reloj, arranged by Daniel Catán
- Daniel Catán: Comprendo, to lyrics by Manuel Acuña (1849–1873)
- Alberto Domínguez (1913–1975) Perfidia, arranged by Efraín Oscher.
- Ignacio Fernández Esperón (1892–1968) Íntima, to lyrics by Ricardo López (1903–1989)
- María Grever (1792–1868) Despedida, arranged by Efraín Oscher,
  - Te quiero dijiste, arranged by Daniel Catán and Gonzalo Grau
- Augustin Lara: Veracruz, arranged by Gonzalo Grau
  - Noche de ronda, arranged by Efraín Oscher
  - Solamente una vez, arranged by Efraín Oscher
- Tomás Méndez (1927–1995): Cucurrucucú paloma, arranged by Gonzalo Grau
- Jorge del Moral: (1900–1941) Besos robados
- Alfonso Esparza Oteo (1894–1950) Dime que sí, arranged by Efraín Oscher
  - Un viejo amor arranged by Gonzalo Grau
- Manuel María Ponce (1882–1948) Estrellita, arranged by de:Alfonso Montes
- Consuelo Velázquez (1916–2005) Besame Mucho, arranged by Efraín Oscher

== Chart performance ==
Chart	Peak position
Austria	23
Denmark	32
France	42
Germany	52
Greece	45
Mexico	13
Spain	85
