= Jacques Delacôte =

French conductor

Jacques Delacôte (born 16 August 1942) is a French conductor. He studied at the Conservatoire de Paris and the Vienna Music Academy. In 1971, he was chosen the first winner of the Dimitri Mitropoulos Contest. He also served as an assistant to Leonard Bernstein and Darius Milhaud. He has conducted many of the world's major orchestras, including the Cleveland Orchestra, New York Philharmonic, London Philharmonic, London Symphony Orchestra, Montreal Symphony Orchestra, and Royal Philharmonic.
