= Doña Francisquita =

Zarzuela in three acts composed by Amadeo Vives

- Zarzuela by Amadeo Vives
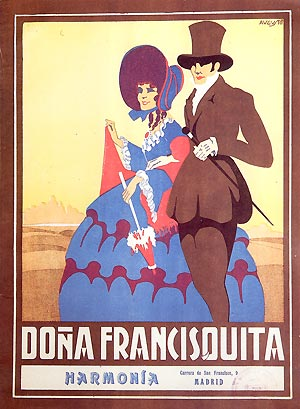
- Poster
- Librettist: Federico Romero; Guillermo Fernández-Shaw
- Language: Spanish
- Based on: Lope de Vega's La discreta enamorada
- Premiere: 17 October 1923; Teatro Apolo, Madrid

Doña Francisquita is a zarzuela in three acts composed by Amadeo Vives to a Spanish libretto by Federico Romero and Guillermo Fernández-Shaw and based on Lope de Vega's play La discreta enamorada (The Ingenious Lover). With its colourful score and comic story of multiple love triangles which ends happily for the young lovers, Francisquita and Fernando, Doña Francisquita is considered a classic of the zarzuela genre, and Vives' masterpiece.

== Performance history ==
Doña Francisquita premiered at the Teatro Apolo in Madrid on 17 October 1923. It became very popular, receiving over 5000 performances throughout the Spanish-speaking world in the years immediately following its premiere. The work is still regularly performed in Spain and Latin America, but like most works in this genre, has only rarely been seen elsewhere. It was, however, performed in French translation at Monte Carlo, Brussels and Vichy in 1934 and received a major production at Washington National Opera in 1998.

There have been several film adaptations of Doña Francisquita, the most recent of which was directed by Ladislao Vajda and shown at the Cannes Film Festival in 1953 with Mirtha Legrand and Armando Calvo in the leading roles. The act 1 soprano aria "Canción del ruiseñor" ("The Song of the Nightingale") and the act 2 tenor aria "Por el humo se sabe donde está el fuego" ("We know where the fire is by the smoke") have been individually recorded or sung in recitals by many opera singers from Spanish-speaking countries.

== Roles ==
Roles, voice types, premiere cast
Role	Voice type	Premiere cast, 17 October 1923
Francisquita	soprano	Mari Isaura
Fernando Soler	tenor	Juan de Casenave
Aurora la Beltrana, an actress	mezzo-soprano	Cora Raga
Doña Francisca, Francisquita's mother	contralto	Felisa Lázaro
Don Mathias, Fernando's father	bass	Ricardo Güell
Cardona, Fernando's friend	tenor	Antonio Palacio
Lorenzo Pérez, Aurora's lover	baritone	Juan Frontera

== Synopsis ==
Time: 19th century
Place: Madrid during the Carnival season.

Francisquita is in love with student and would-be poet, Fernando. He, however, is infatuated with the fiery actress Aurora la Beltrana, who in turn is the lover of Lorenzo Pérez. When Francisquita tries to flirt with Fernando, he ignores her. His friend Cardona takes him to task and suggests that he would be happier with her than Aurora. Francisquita is then wooed by the Don Mathias, Fernando's father, in the presence of Doña Francisca, Francisquita's mother. At first, Doña Francisca mistakenly believes that she is the object of Don Mathias' affections. Francisquita pretends to accept the elderly man's advances, hoping to make Fernando jealous.

At the urging of Cardona, Fernando also makes advances to Francisquita hoping to make Aurora jealous. Fernando's passion for Francisquita starts to grow. He is horrified that she might marry his father and become Doña Francisquita. He tells Aurora that she no longer has any power over him, which at last piques her interest in him. But it is too late, he is now completely in love with Francisquita. All is resolved after a series of misunderstandings and machinations involving Cardona disguising himself as a woman; Aurora's lover, Lorenzo Perez, challenging Fernando to a duel; and rumours that Fernando plans to marry Francisquita's mother to the subsequent horror of Don Mathias. Don Mathias eventually realizes he is too old for Francisquita and gives his blessing to the young couple. In the finale all celebrate the forthcoming wedding of Francisquita and Fernando by singing "Canción de la Juventud" ("Song of Youth"), a hymn to the youthful spirit of Madrid.

== Recordings ==
- María Bayo (Francisquita), Alfredo Kraus (Fernando), Raquel Pierotti (Aurora); Orquesta Sinfónica de Tenerife; Antoni Ros-Marbà (conductor). Label: Naïve Classique.
- María Rosa del Campo (Francisquita), Jaime Aragall (Fernando), Norma Lerer (Aurora); Orquesta Filarmonía de España; Lamberto Gardelli (conductor). Label: Alhambra/Columbia MCE 846-7 / SCE 946-7.
- Ainhoa Arteta (Francisquita), Plácido Domingo (Fernando), Linda Mirabal (Aurora); Orquesta Sinfónica de Sevilla; Miguel Roa (conductor). Label: Sony Classical.
