= Paul Ethuin =

French conductor (1924–2011)

Paul Ethuin (Bruay-sur-l'Escaut, 24 September 1924 – Reims, 1 November 2011) was a French conductor who was particularly associated with building up the opera company in Rouen and who conducted an important Ring Cycle in France in the 1960s.

== Life and career ==
Ethuin studied the flute at the Paris Conservatoire after which he was employed at the Reims Conservatoire until 1951. In that city he began his conducting career before moving to the Toulouse Capitole from 1955 to 1961. After brief periods in Dijon and Avignon, he was music director at the Théâtre des Arts in Rouen from 1966 to 1989. Under his leadership, he improved the orchestra, and encouraged many young French singers.

Although considered a strict and rigorous conductor, his support for young singers was well-acknowledged. At Rouen his repertoire extended across the French works through Italian favourites and Wagner, and including operetta. From 1984 to 1989 he was overall Director of the Théâtre des Arts.

He was also engaged at the Opéra de Paris and at the Opéra-Comique. Outside France Ethuin conducted in San Francisco, Los Angeles, Tokyo, Dublin and some Italian centres. As part of the 25th anniversary celebration at the Opéra Royal de Wallonie in Liege, in May 1992 Ethuin conducted La Damnation de Faust where he "laid bare all the nerve-ends of the incandescent music".

In 1969 Ethuin conducted a cycle of Der Ring des Nibelungen in Rouen with an international cast including Ludmila Dvořáková, Helga Dernesch, Richard Holm, Gustav Neidlinger and Kurt Moll.

He conducted rare modern revivals at the Théâtre des Arts in Rouen of L'Aiglon by Honegger in 1977, and of Messager's La Basoche in 1979.

In the southern French festivals, he conducted at the Théâtre antique d'Orange in Orange in 1964 and in 1981 conducted a much-praised Turandot in Avignon with Montserrat Caballé in the title role.

In 2007 Video Arts International issued a DVD of a 1973 performance of Faust with the NHK Symphony Orchestra conducted by Ethuin, with Alfredo Kraus, Renata Scotto and Nicolai Ghiaurov in the principal roles.

== Honors and awards ==
- Knight of the Order of Legion of Honour
- Knight of the Ordre des Arts et des Lettres
