= Reveriano Soutullo =

Spanish composer

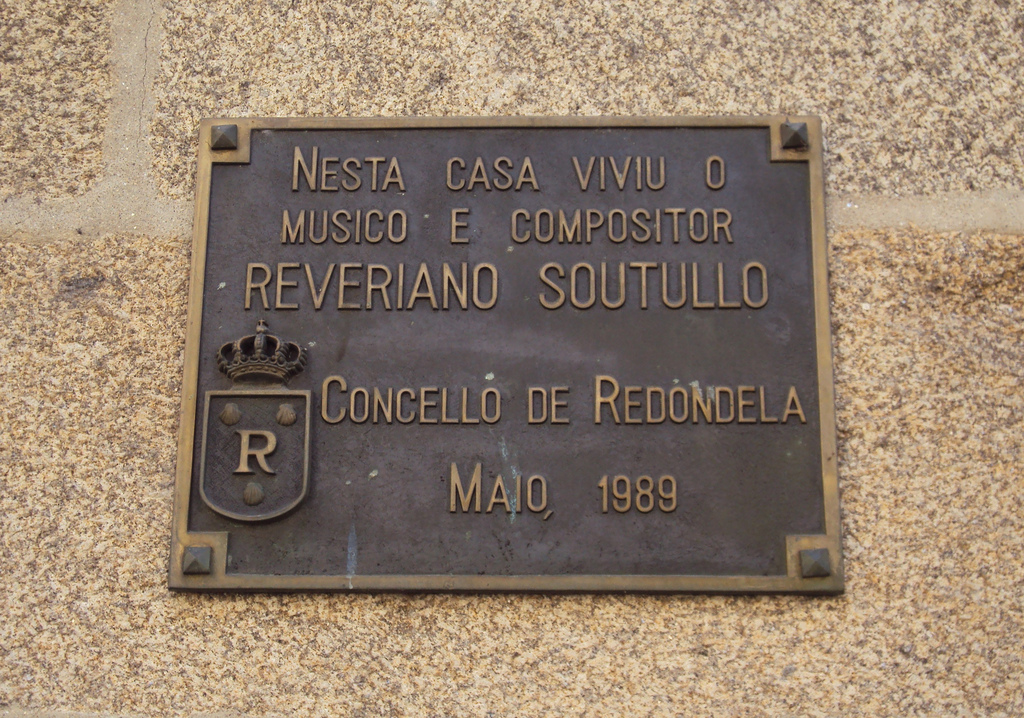

Reveriano Soutullo Otero (11 July 1880 in Ponteareas, Galicia – 29 October 1932 in Vigo) was a Spanish composer of zarzuelas and pasodobles. He collaborated with Juan Vert.
