= Raquel Pierotti =

Uruguayan mezzo-soprano opera singer

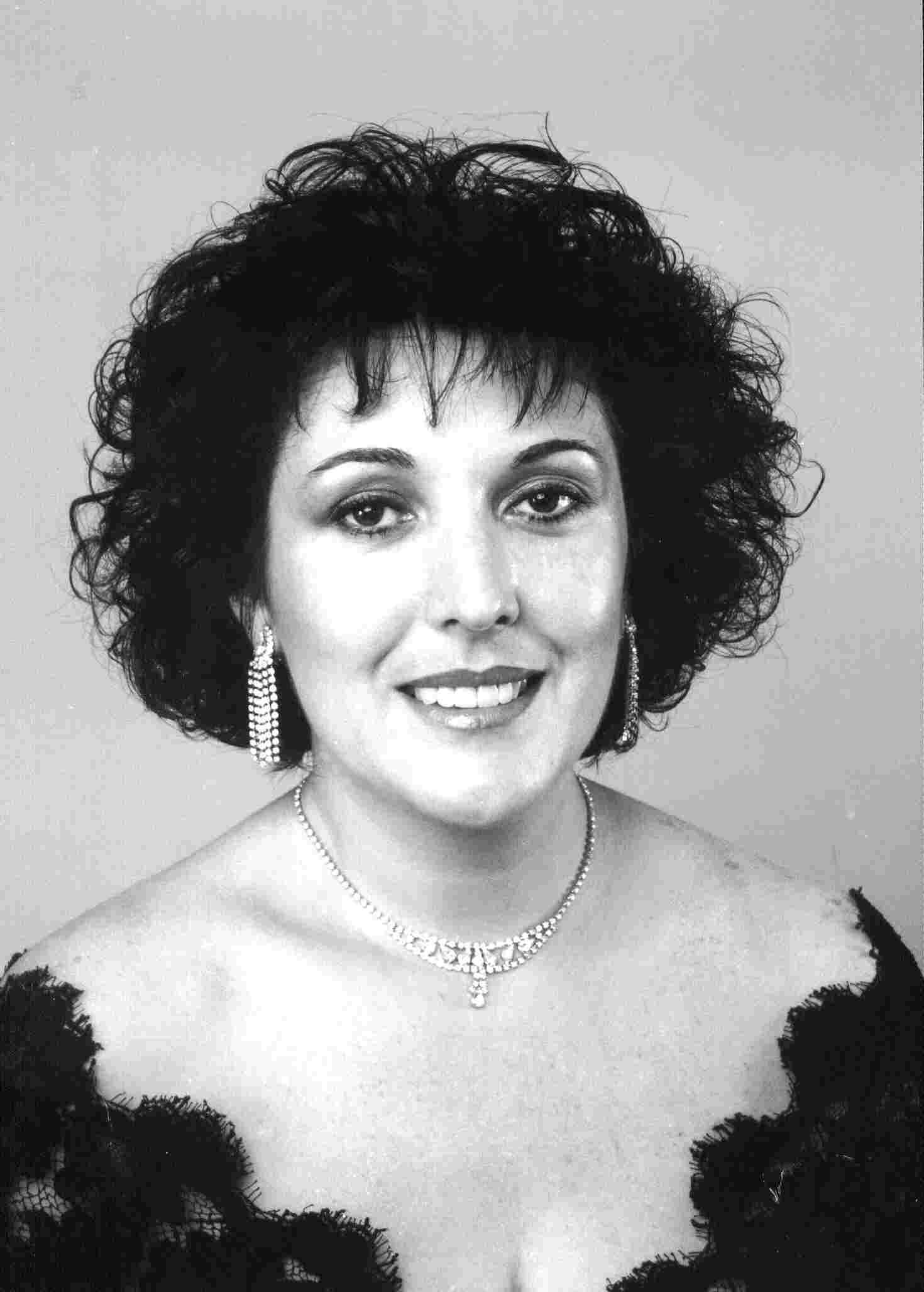
- Born: 17 December 1952 (age 72); Montevideo, Uruguay
- Occupation: opera singer (mezzo-soprano) voice teacher
- Years active: 1973 to present

Raquel Pierotti (born December 17, 1952, Montevideo, Uruguay) is a mezzo-soprano opera singer. She specialized in coloratura roles in the Rossini and Handel repertoire.

== Biography ==
Raquel Pierotti was born in Montevideo, Uruguay where she got her graduation at the National Opera School and made her operatic debut in 1973 as Damigella nuziale in Mozart's Nozze di Figaro. During the next six years she worked in many operatic productions singing Magic Flute, Don Giovanni, Madama Butterfly, Rigoletto as well as in many chamber and symphonic concerts. She won the First Prize in the "Maurice Ravel National Contest" and in the "Artigas - Washington Contest". In 1979 she moved to Spain. She won the "Plácido Domingo Award" in 1979 and the 2º Grand Prix in 1980 both in the "Francisco Viñas Singing Competition". In the same year she won the First Prize in the "Mozart Singing Competition" organized by Barcelona's Mozarteum and the Gold Medal from Radio Nacional de España (Spanish National Broadcasting) given to the most promising debutant of the season.

In 1980 made her operatic début in Spain at the Gran Teatro del Liceo in Barcelona as Lola in Mascagni's Cavalleria Rusticana. The following year she made her European débuts at the Opera de Paris as Rosina in Rossini's Barber of Seville, as well as at La Scala, Milan, as Marcellina in Mozart's Le nozze di Figaro. Since then she has been a frequent guest at La Scala where she sang Clarice in La pietra del paragone (Rossini), Smeton in Anna Bolena (Donizetti), Rosina in Il barbiere di Siviglia (Rossini), Isabella in L'italiana in Algeri (Rossini), Maddalena in Il viaggio a Reims (Rossini), Cecilio in Lucio Silla (Mozart), and Fenena in Nabucco (Verdi) for the 1986/1987 Season Opening Night as well as in the tournées in Berlin, Japan (Tokyo, Osaka, Yokohama) and Bulgaria (Sofia, Varna). On November 2. 1988 she was invited to sing in a concert celebrating the birthday of Her Majesty the Queen of Spain Doña Sofía.

She has worked with renowned conductors as Riccardo Muti, Claudio Abbado, Gianandrea Gavazzeni, Riccardo Chailly, Julius Rudel, John Eliot Gardiner, Jesús López Cobos, Sir John Pritchard, Alain Lombard, Lorin Maazel... and directors as Giorgio Strehler, Jean Pierre Ponnelle, Eduardo De Filippo, Patrice Chéreau, Pier Luigi Pizzi, Roberto De Simone, Luca Ronconi, Lluis Pasqual, Jérôme Savary, Beni Montresor, Gabriele Lavia, Jorge Lavelli, José Carlos Plaza. She has appeared at most of the well-known opera houses in Italy such as Milan, Rome, Naples, Pesaro, Bologna, Florence, Turin, Genoa, Parma, Palermo and Verona among others as well as outside Italy in Barcelona, Sevilla, Madrid, Vienna, Stuttgart, Munich, Brussels, Geneva, Paris, Lyon, Lisbon, Buenos Aires, Santiago de Chile, Montevideo, Mexico, Caracas, Pretoria, Tokyo, Washington...

Among her activities are recitals of Spanish and Latin American music as well as "Zarzuela". She has created the role of "Tatula" from the opera Divinas palabras in the opening season (1997/ 98) at the Teatro Real (Madrid), singing with Plácido Domingo. In 1999 she sang La vida breve in Lyon, Grenoble and La Coruña, and El amor brujo and Siete conciones Populares Españolas in Lyon, Palermo, Montevideo, Porto Alegre, Varsaw, Dortmund and Pamplona. In 2000 she sang a concert in Hannover, representing Spain in occasion of the World Fair. In April 2002 and 2004 she sang Babel 46 (Montsalvatge) and L'enfant et les sortilèges (Ravel) at the Teatro Real (Madrid) and Liceo de Barcelona. She sang the role of Mariana (Luisa Fernanda) in Scala di Milano (2003), Teatro Real (Madrid) (2006) and Theathr an der Wien (Vienna) (2008) all with Plácido Domingo. In 2004 and 2007 she sang Boris Godunov (Nurse) at Liceo de Barcelona and Teatro Real (Madrid). In August 2009 she sang the leading role of "La casa de Bernanda Alba" (Bernarda), created by the young Spanish composer Miquel Ortega, in Santander Festival and Perelada Festival. In 2005 she has been member of the jury in the prestigious "Francisco Viñas" and "Manuel Ausensi" singing contests.

== Roles ==
During her career she sang : Sextus and Cornelia (Giulio Cesare); Siebel (Faust); Cherubino (Le nozze di Figaro); Cecilio (Lucio Silla); Dorabella (Cosi fan tutte); Zerlina (Don Giovanni); Angelina (La Cenerentola); Arsace (Semiramide); Isabella (L'Italiana in Algeri); Rosina (Il Barbiere di Siviglia) Andromaca (Ermione); Maddalena (Il viaggio a Reims); Clarice (La pietra del paragone); Orfeo (Orfeo ed Euridice); Fidalma (Il matrimonio segreto); Leonora (La Favorita); Adalgisa (Norma); Smeton (Anna Bolena); Elisabetta (Maria Stuarda); Carmen (Carmen); Sara (Roberto Devereux); Romeo (Capuleti e Montecchi); Agnese (Beatrice di Tenda); Giulietta (Les contes d'Hoffmann); Salud and la Abuela (La vida breve); Ottavia (L'incoronazione di Poppea); Preziosilla (La forza del destino); Meg and Quickly (Falstaff ); Climene (Saffo); Suzuki (Madama Butterfly); Berenice (Il Farnace); Vagans (Juditha triumphans); Mrs. Slender (Falstaff-Salieri), Cecilia (Las Golondrinas), Zulima (Los amantes de Teruel), Aurora (Doña Francisquita), Señá Rita (La verbena de la Paloma), Mariana (Luisa Fernanda), Nurse (Boris Godunov)...

== Symphonic Repertoire ==
- Rossini: Stabat Mater, Petite Messe Sollennelle, Argene e Melania and Giovanna D'Arco
- Haendel: Messiah
- Mozart: Coronation Mass and Requiem
- Beethoven: Symphony nª 9
- Pablo Casals: El pessebre
- Pergolesi: Stabat Mater
- Stravinsky: Pulcinella
- Bach: Magnificat
- Jaume Alaquer: Requiem
- Tomás Bretón: Apocalipsis
- Verdi: Requiem
- Mendelssohn: Paulus
- Vivaldi: Juditha Triumphans

== Recordings ==
- Il barbiere di Siviglia - Berta (Riccardo Chailly)
- Il viaggio a Reims - Maddalena (Claudio Abbado)
- Le comte Ory - Ragonde (John Eliot Gardiner)
- Giulio Cesare - Cornelia (Marcello Panni)
- The Concert Mozart for Africa with Montserrat Caballé
- Doña Francisquita - Aurora with Alfredo Kraus, (Antoni Ros-Marbá)
- La verbena de la Paloma - Señá Rita and La Dolores-Gaspara both with Plácido Domingo (Antoni Ros-Marbá)
- Viento es la dicha de amor-Amor (Christophe Coin)
- El pessebre (Lawrence Foster);
- Il Farnace - Berenice (Massimiliano Carraro)
- El llibre vermell (Antoni Ros-Marbá),
- Requiem - Jaume Alaquer (Joan Company)
- Luisa Fernanda - Mariana (Jesús López Cobos)
- Falstaff - Meg (Daniel Oren)
- Nabucco - Fenena (Riccardo Muti)
- Hommage à Rossini (TV 1985)

== Awards ==
- Maurice Ravel National Contest
- Artigas - Washington Contest
- Plácido Domigo Award
- Francisco Viñas Singing Competition
- Mozart Singing Competition, Barcelona's Mozarteum
- Gold Medal from Radio Nacional de España
- Alas Awards 2010
- Intendencia de Montevideo Homage
