= Juan Vert =

Spanish composer

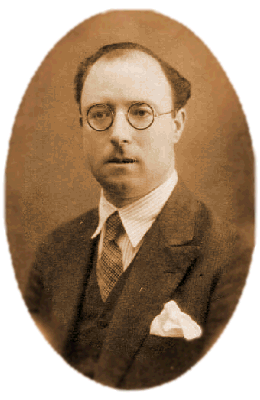
Juan Vert

Juan Bautista Vert Carbonell (1890, in Carcaixent – 1931, in Madrid) was a Valencian composer of Spanish zarzuelas. He worked in collaboration with Reveriano Soutullo.

== Works ==
Catalog of works by Juan Vert (list not exhaustive)
| Year | Work | Type | Librettist |
|---|---|---|---|
| 1917 | Las vírgenes paganas. | Zarzuela | Enrique García Alvarez and ca:Félix Garzo |
| 1918 | El Versalles madrileño. | Zarzuela | - |
| 1919 | El capricho de una reina (in collaboration with Reveriano Soutullo). | Zarzuela | es:Antonio Paso y es:Antonio Vidal y Moya |
| 1919 | La Garduña (in collaboration with Soutullo). | Zarzuela | Antonio Paso y es:José Rosales Méndez |
| 1919 | Justicias y ladrones (in collaboration with Soutullo) . | Operetta | - |
| 1920 | La Guillotina (in collaboration with Soutullo). | Zarzuela | Pastor |
| 1920 | Guitarras y bandurrias (in collaboration with Soutullo). | Zarzuela | es:Francisco García Pacheco y Antonio Paso |
| 1921 | Los hombrecitos (in collaboration with Soutullo). | Zarzuela | es:Enrique Calonge |
| 1921 | La Paloma del barrio (in collaboration with Soutullo). | Zarzuela | - |
| 1921 | Las perversas (in collaboration with Soutullo). | Zarzuela | Alfonso Lapena Casañas y Alfonso Muñoz |
| 1922 | La venus de Chamberí (in collaboration with Soutullo). | Zarzuela | Fernando Luque |
| 1923 | La conquista del mundo (in collaboration with Soutullo). | Zarzuela | Fernando Luque |
| 1923 | La piscina del Buda (in collaboration with Soutullo y Vicente Lleó). | Zarzuela | Antonio Paso y Joaquín Dicenta |
| 1923 | El regalo de boda (in collaboration with Soutullo). | Zarzuela | Fernando Luque |
| 1924 | La leyenda del beso (in collaboration with Soutullo). | Zarzuela | Enrique Reoyo, Antonio Paso y Silva Aramburu |
| 1924 | La chica del sereno (in collaboration with Soutullo). | Zarzuela | - |
| 1925 | La casita del guarda (in collaboration with Soutullo). | Zarzuela | Enrique Calonge |
| 1925 | Primitivo y la Gregoria o el amor en la Prehistoria (in collaboration with Soutullo). | Zarzuela | Fernando Luque y Enrique Calonge |
| 1925 | Encarna, la misterio (in collaboration with Soutullo). | Zarzuela | Enrique Calonge y Fernando Luque |
| 1927 | La del Soto del Parral (in collaboration with Soutullo). | Zarzuela | Anselmo C. Carreño y Luis Fernández de Sevilla |
| 1927 | El último romántico (in collaboration with Reveriano Soutullo). | Zarzuela | José Tellaeche |
| 1928 | Las Maravillosas (in collaboration with Soutullo) . | Revista musical | Antonio Paso y Tomás Borrás |
| 1930 | Las Pantorrillas (in collaboration with Soutullo). | Zarzuela | Joaquin Mariño y Francisco García Loygorri |
| | El capricho de Margot (in collaboration with Soutullo). | Zarzuela | - |
| | Las aventuras de Colón. | Zarzuela | - |
