= Agustín Pérez (footballer) =

Argentine professional footballer

Personal information
- Full name: Agustín Nicolás Pérez
- Date of birth: 22 November 1991 (age 34)
- Place of birth: Morteros, Argentina
- Height: 1.87 m (6 ft 2 in)
- Position: Goalkeeper

Senior career*
Years	Team	Apps	(Gls)
2012–2014	Platense	24	(0)
2015–2017	Fénix	45	(0)
2017–2018	UAI Urquiza	0	(0)
2018–2019	Comunicaciones	14	(0)
2019	JJ Urquiza	0	(0)
2020–2021	Deportivo Armenio	9	(0)
- * Club domestic league appearances and goals as of 09:25, 24 June 2020 (UTC)

Agustín Nicolás Pérez (born 22 November 1991) is an Argentine professional footballer who plays as a goalkeeper.

== Career ==
Platense were Pérez's first club. He appeared twenty-seven times for the club across three seasons, including for his senior bow on 18 August 2012 versus Chacarita Juniors in Primera B Metropolitana. Pérez completed a move to fellow tier three team Fénix in January 2015. Forty-six appearances occurred across three seasons. Pérez spent the entirety of 2017–18 with UAI Urquiza but didn't feature competitively. On 30 June 2018, Comunicaciones signed Pérez. He made his first appearances for them in December, participating in every minute of games against Sacachispas, Deportivo Español and Tristán Suárez.

July 2019 saw Pérez join third tier JJ Urquiza, though he'd leave six months later without featuring. In January 2020, Pérez penned terms with Deportivo Armenio.

== Career statistics ==
As of 24 June 2020.

Appearances and goals by club, season and competition
Club	Season	League			Cup		League Cup		Continental		Other		Total	
Club	Season	Division	Apps	Goals	Apps	Goals	Apps	Goals	Apps	Goals	Apps	Goals	Apps	Goals
Platense	2012–13	Primera B Metropolitana	15	0	1	0	—		—		1 (Note: Appearance(s) in the Primera B Metropolitana play-offs)	0	17	0
Platense	2013–14	Primera B Metropolitana	9	0	1	0	—		—		0	0	10	0
Platense	2014	Primera B Metropolitana	0	0	0	0	—		—		0	0	0	0
Platense	Total		24	0	2	0	—		—		1	0	27	0
Fénix	2015	Primera B Metropolitana	28	0	1	0	—		—		0	0	29	0
Fénix	2016	Primera B Metropolitana	2	0	0	0	—		—		0	0	2	0
Fénix	2016–17	Primera B Metropolitana	15	0	0	0	—		—		0	0	15	0
Fénix	Total		45	0	1	0	—		—		0	0	46	0
UAI Urquiza	2017–18	Primera B Metropolitana	0	0	0	0	—		—		0	0	0	0
Comunicaciones	2018–19	Primera B Metropolitana	14	0	0	0	—		—		0	0	14	0
JJ Urquiza	2019–20	Primera B Metropolitana	0	0	0	0	—		—		0	0	0	0
Deportivo Armenio	2019–20	Primera B Metropolitana	8	0	0	0	—		—		0	0	8	0
Career total			91	0	3	0	—		—		1	0	95	0
