= Royal Seville Symphony Orchestra =

Spanish musical group

- Orchestra
- Founded: 1990
- Location: Seville, Spain
- Principal conductor: John Axelrod
- Website: www.rossevilla.es

The Royal Seville Symphony Orchestra (Spanish: Real Orquesta Sinfónica de Sevilla), founded in 1990, is a symphony orchestra based in Seville, Spain.

One of the leading Spanish Orchestras is the resident of the Teatro de la Maestranza in Seville. Its first music director was Vjekoslav Šutej. Later music directors include Klaus Weise, Alain Lombard, and Pedro Halffter. The current music director, unanimously elected by the musicians, is John Axelrod.
