= La tabernera del puerto =

Spanish zarzuela by Pablo Sorozábal

- Zarzuela by Pablo Sorozábal
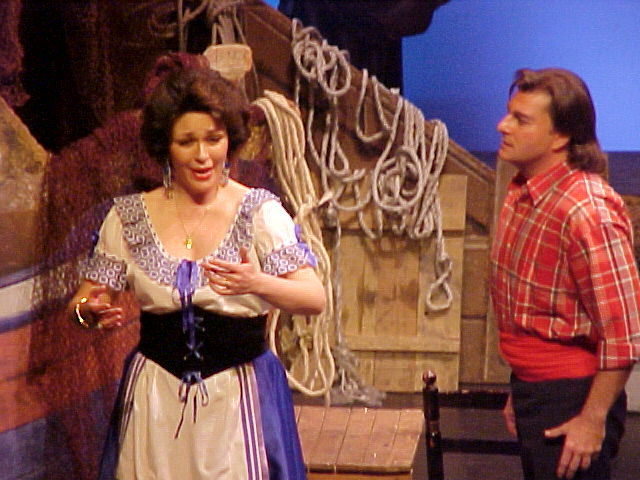
- Other title: Romance Marinero
- Librettist: Federico Romero; Guillermo Fernández-Shaw
- Language: Spanish
- Premiere: 6 April 1936; Teatro Tívoli, Barcelona

La tabernera del puerto (also known as Romance Marinero) is a zarzuela in three acts by composer Pablo Sorozábal. The opera uses a Spanish-language libretto by Federico Romero and Guillermo Fernández-Shaw. The work premiered at the Teatro Tívoli in Barcelona on 6 April 1936.

The aria "No puede ser" is a popular excerpt.

== Roles ==
| Role | Voice type | Premiere cast 6 April 1936 |
|---|---|---|
| Marola, a barmaid | soprano | |
| Juan de Eguía, Marola's father | baritone | |
| Leandro, Marola's lover | tenor | |
| Simpson, a former sailor | bass | |
| Abel, a young vagabond | soprano | |
| Chinchorro, skipper of the boat Leandro | baritone | |
| Antigua, old woman selling hammock and sardines | mezzo-soprano | |
| Ripalda, a waiter | tenor | |
| Verdier, a smuggler and friend of Juan de Eguía | barítone | |
