= Rolando Villazón =

Mexican tenor (born 1972)

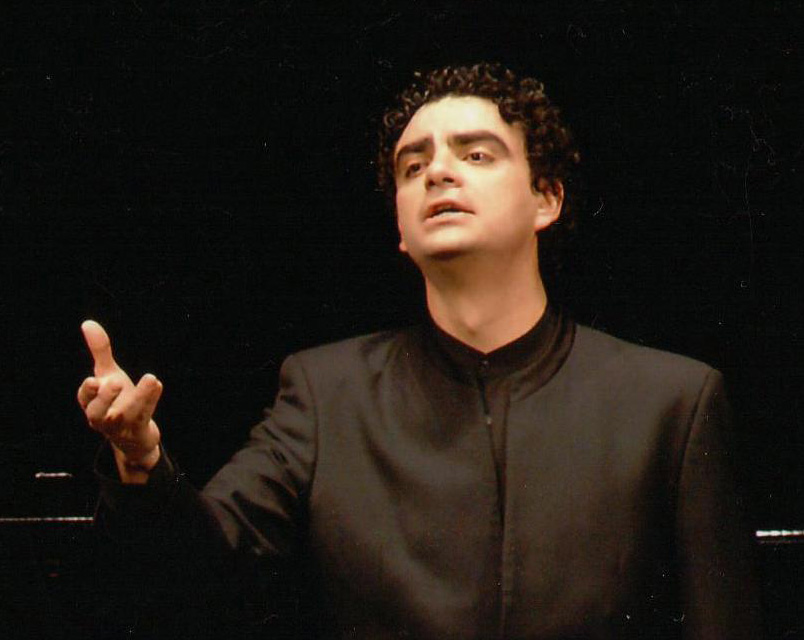
- Villazón during a recital at the Teatro Real Madrid, 2014
- Born: February 22, 1972 (age 54); Fuentes de Satélite, Mexico
- Citizenship: Mexican; French
- Occupations: Opera singer (tenor), artistic director
- Years active: 1999–present
- Spouse: Lucia
- Children: 2 (Mateo and Dario)
- Website: www.rolandovillazon.com

Rolando Villazón Mauleón (born February 22, 1972) is a Mexican operatic tenor, stage director, author, radio and television personality, and artistic director. He resides in France and received French citizenship in 2007.

Villazón has published several books, including the novels Malabares and Paladas de sombra contra la oscuridad, which have been translated into French and German. He is a member of the Collège de 'Pataphysique in Paris.

== Early life ==
Villazón was raised in Fuentes de Satélite, a suburban area of Greater Mexico City, Mexico. In an interview for Mexican television, he recounted how he was discovered as a tenor. According to Villazón, while he was singing in the shower at his apartment in Mexico City, baritone Arturo Nieto, a friend of his neighbour, heard him singing and knocked on his door. Nieto subsequently encouraged Villazón to develop his voice and invited him to attend his music academy, where Villazón later developed an interest in opera.

== Career ==
=== Late 1990s and early 2000s ===
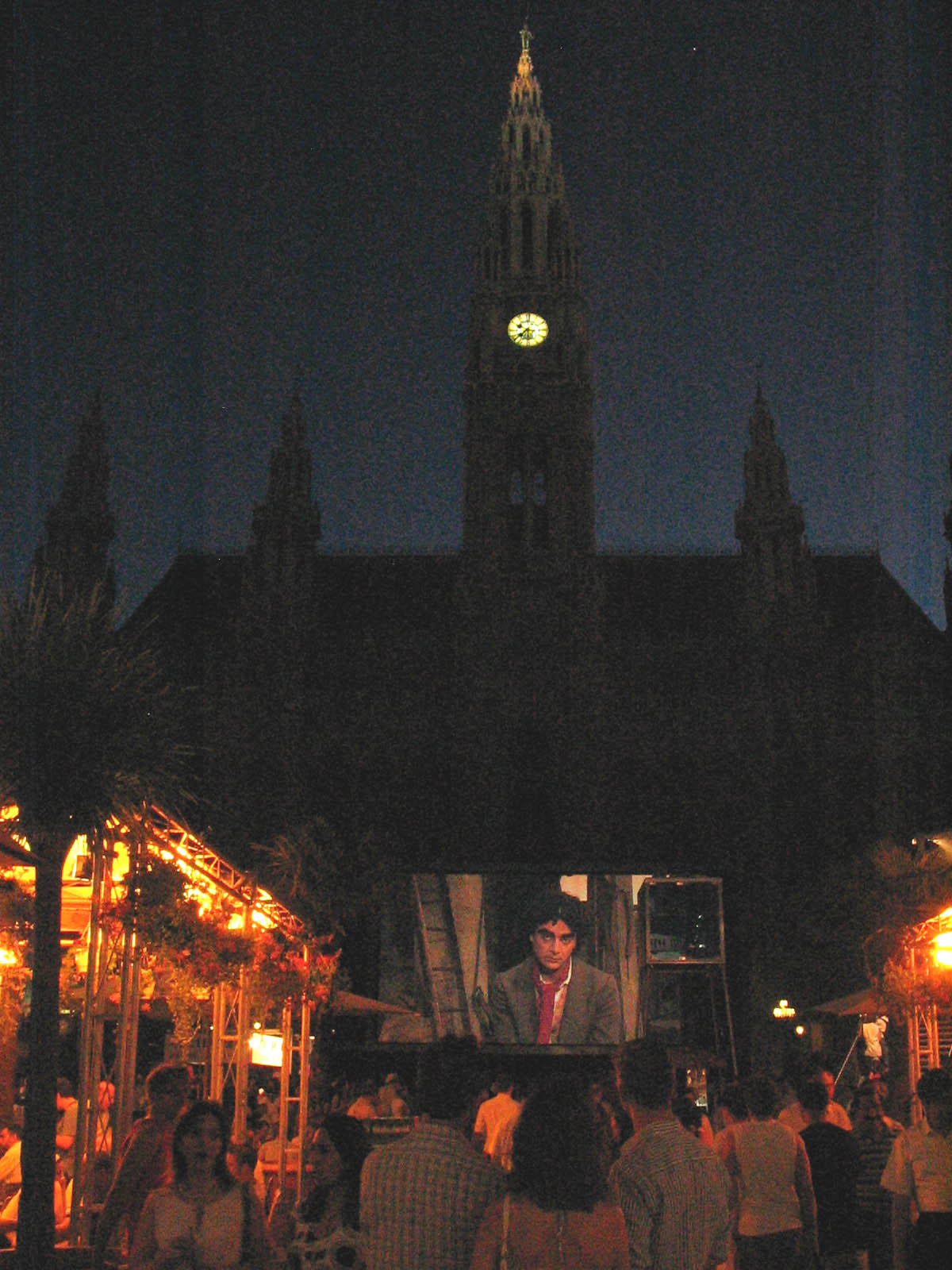
2007 Vienna summer event

Villazón came to international attention in 1999 when he won second prize in Plácido Domingo's Operalia competition, finishing behind Bulgarian bass Orlin Anastassov. In the same competition, he also received the first prize for Zarzuela and the audience prize. That year, he made his Italian debut as des Grieux in Massenet's Manon at the Teatro Carlo Felice in Genoa.

In 2000, Villazón made his debut at the Berlin State Opera as Macduff in Verdi's Macbeth. Over subsequent seasons, he performed several of his principal roles there, including Don José in Bizet's Carmen and again des Grieux in Manon. Also in 2000, he appeared as Rodolfo in Puccini's La bohème in Munich. In 2002, he performed as Rinuccio in Puccini's Gianni Schicchi in Los Angeles.

In 2003, Villazón portrayed Rodolfo again at the Glyndebourne Festival Opera in England and later appeared in the title role of Offenbach's Les contes d'Hoffmann at the Royal Opera House in London. The following year, he made his debut at the Metropolitan Opera in New York City as Alfredo in Verdi's La traviata. In 2005, he appeared in the same role at the Mariinsky Theatre in Saint Petersburg and at the Salzburg Festival.

=== 2005–2010 ===
Villazón performed regularly at major opera houses worldwide and in concert during this period. In August 2005, he portrayed Alfredo at the Salzburg Festival, in a production conducted by Carlo Rizzi and directed by Willy Decker, alongside Anna Netrebko as Violetta. Villazón and Netrebko also appeared together in Donizetti's L'elisir d'amore at the Vienna State Opera, a performance that was later released on DVD. He performed with Netrebko and Plácido Domingo in globally televised concerts from Berlin's Waldbühne and Vienna's Schönbrunn Palace in 2006 and 2008.

==== Vocal surgery and return to the stage ====
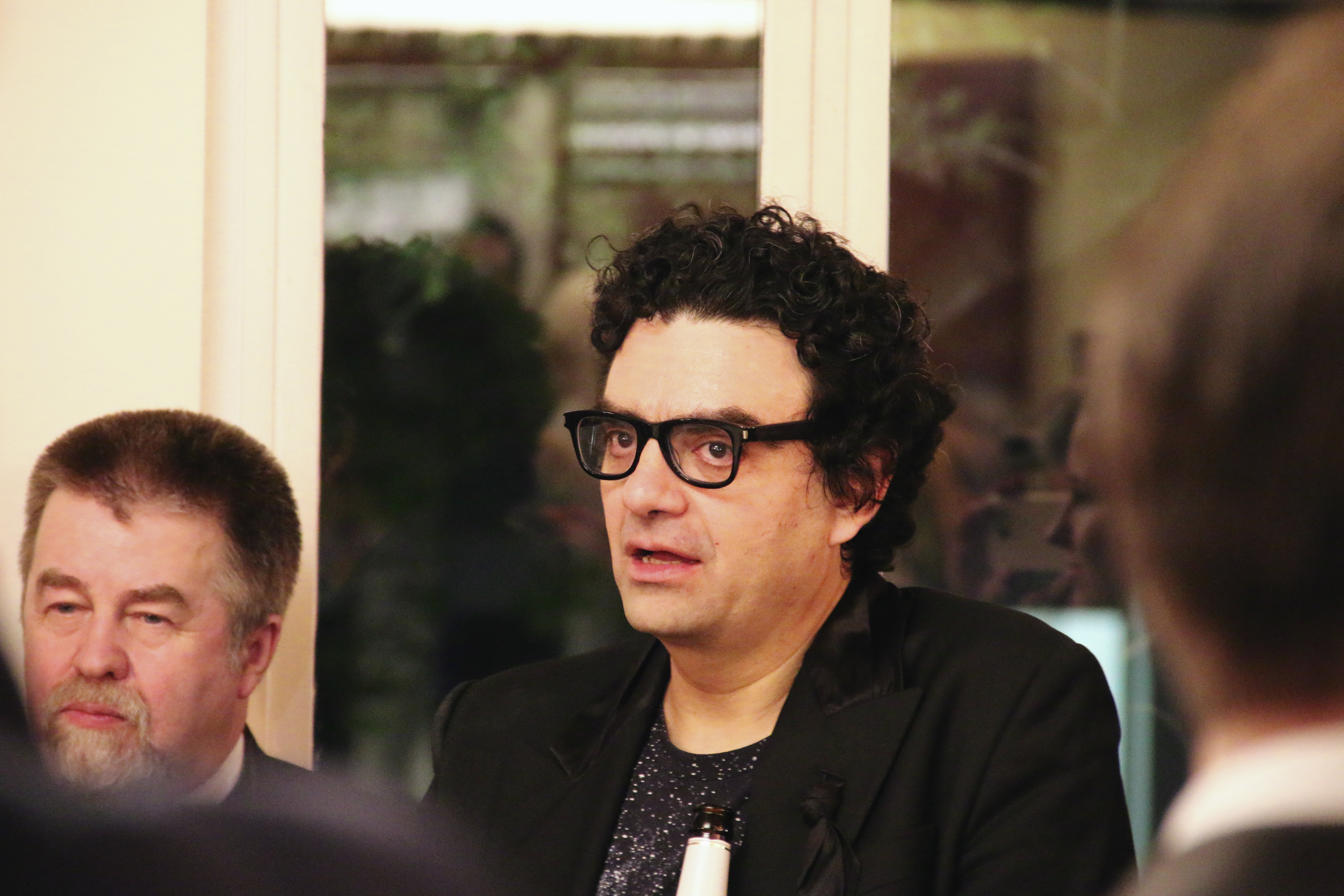
Davy Cunningham (left) and Rolando Villazón, 2017

Between 2007 and 2009, Villazón cancelled a number of scheduled engagements in order to address a persistent vocal problem. In May 2009, he announced that he would undergo surgery to remove a congenital cyst from one of his vocal cords.

Following his rehabilitation, Villazón returned to the operatic stage in March 2010 as Nemorino in L'elisir d'amore at the Vienna State Opera and undertook a series of recitals. In December 2012, he appeared again as Rodolfo at the Royal Opera House, as in 2005.

From 2010 onward, Villazón undertook a number of tenor roles by Mozart in both concert and staged performances, including Don Ottavio in Don Giovanni at the Festspiel Baden-Baden, the Royal Opera House, and the Berlin State Opera; Alessandro in Il re pastore, conducted by William Christie at the Opernhaus Zürich and the Salzburg Festival; and the title role in Lucio Silla at the Salzburg Festival. His first all-Mozart solo album, featuring the composer's concert arias for tenor, was released in January 2014.

=== 2015–present ===
Villazón has continued to perform at major international opera houses and has expanded his repertoire. In 2016, he made his debut in Bohuslav Martinů's Juliette ou la clé des songes in a new production conducted by Daniel Barenboim at the Berlin State Opera. That year he performed the title role of Monteverdi's L'Orfeo first, a role he later performed in new productions at the Semperoper Dresden and the Santa Fe Opera in 2023.

In 2017, Villazón appeared first in the title role of Monteverdi's Il ritorno d'Ulisse in patria in Paris. In 2018 he first portrayed Pelléas in Debussy's Pelléas et Mélisande, again conducted by Barenboim. In 2021, he returned to the Metropolitan Opera as Papageno in The Magic Flute. In 2022, Villazón first performed in a Wagner role, as Loge in Das Rheingold at the Berlin State Opera in a new production by Dmitri Tcherniakov conducted by Christian Thielemann.

In 2018, Villazón was appointed artistic director of Mozart Week in Salzburg, and in 2021 he became artistic director of the International Mozarteum Foundation, which organises the festival. His contract was extended until 2028.

On May 18, 2026, he's set to star as Cervantes / Don Quxiote in Man of La Mancha in concert at the Vivian Beaumont Theater.

=== Stage direction ===
Villazón made his debut as a stage director with a new production of Massenet's Werther at the Opéra de Lyon in January 2011. He directed L'elisir d'amore at Festspielhaus Baden-Baden (2012) and Oper Leipzig (2019), Donizetti's Viva la Mamma at the Vienna Volksoper (2015), Puccini's La rondine at Deutsche Oper Berlin (2015), La traviata at Festspielhaus Baden-Baden (2015), Die Fledermaus by J. Strauss at Deutsche Oper Berlin (2018), Bellini's La sonnambula at Théâtre des Champs-Élysées (2021) and Rossini's Il barbiere di Siviglia at the Salzburg Festival (2022).

=== Recording career and television and film appearances ===
In addition to his appearances on the opera stage, Villazón maintains an active recording career. He has recorded four solo CDs with Virgin Classics and is additionally featured, along with Patrizia Ciofi and Topi Lehtipuu, on the recording of Monteverdi's Il combattimento di Tancredi e Clorinda, conducted by Emmanuelle Haïm. An album of zarzuelas (Gitano, Virgin Classics) conducted by Plácido Domingo, was released in Spring 2007. The U.S. version of his album Viva Villazón (Virgin Classics) was released in September 2007. Villazón sang "La Prima Luce" on the 2014 Yanni/Plácido Domingo/Ric Wake collaboration album Inspirato.

In 2007, Villazón switched his recording company and signed an exclusive long-term contract with Deutsche Grammophon. For DG, Rolando Villazón has recorded over 20 CDs and DVDs, which have received numerous prizes. His discography includes leading roles in complete recordings of six Mozart operas conducted by Yannick Nézet-Séguin.

In early 2010 he was a mentor and judge in the ITV show Popstar to Operastar. From 2012 – 2015, he was the host of the German Echo Klassik awards. Since 2011, he has hosted his own programme on Arte TV, featuring the "Stars of tomorrow". He presents a daily show on Germany's Klassik Radio and hosts a show on France's Radio Classique.

Villazón appeared as an Italian opera singer in the 2024 film Cabrini.

== Personal life ==
Villazón is married to Lucia who was his fellow student at the Mexican Academy of Performing Arts in Mexico City. They met when he was sixteen and she was fifteen. Lucia encouraged him to pursue a singing career rather than becoming a priest.

They live in Paris with their two sons, Dario and Mateo.

== Discography ==
- Romeo y Julieta (CD, 2002), Radio Televisión Española
- Der fliegende Holländer (CD, 2002), Teldec Classics
- Berlioz: La Révolution grecque (CD, 2004), EMI Classics
- Italian Opera Arias (CD, 2004), Virgin Classics
- Gounod & Massenet Arias (CD, 2005), Virgin Classics
- Tristan und Isolde (CDs and DVD, 2005), EMI Classics
- Don Carlo (two DVDs, 2005), Opus Arte
- La traviata (CD, 2005), Deutsche Grammophon
- Merry Christmas (soundtrack) (CD, 2005), Virgin Classics
- Opera Recital (CD; bonus edition with DVD, 2006), Virgin Classics
- La traviata (DVD; premium two-DVD edition, including behind-the-scenes material and rehearsals) (2006), Salzburger Festspiele 2005, Deutsche Grammophon
- La bohème (DVD, 2006), Bregenzer Festspiele 2002, ORF and Capriccio
- Monteverdi: Il combattimento (CD; bonus edition with DVD, 2006), Virgin Classics
- Donizetti: L'elisir d'amore (DVD, 2006), Virgin Classics
- The Berlin Concert: Live from the Waldbühne (DVD, 2006), Deutsche Grammophon
- Gitano (CD; bonus edition with DVD, February 2007), Virgin Classics
- Duets, featuring Rolando Villazón and Anna Netrebko (CD; bonus edition with DVD, March 2007), Deutsche Grammophon
- Viva Villazón (compilation CD, 2007), Virgin Classics
- La bohème (live recording, two-CD set, 2008), Deutsche Grammophon
- Cielo e mar (CD, 2008), Deutsche Grammophon
- Roméo et Juliette (two DVDs, Salzburger Festspiele 2008) (2009), Deutsche Grammophon
- Georg Friedrich Händel (CD/CD+DVD, 2009), Deutsche Grammophon
- La bohème (DVD, 2009)
- ¡México! (2010)
- Vivaldi: Ercole sul Termodonte, with Fabio Biondi and Europa Galante (CD, 2010), Erato
- La strada – Songs from the Movies (CD, 2011), Deutsche Grammophon
- Don Giovanni (CD, 2012), Deutsche Grammophon
- Villazón Verdi (CD, 2012), Deutsche Grammophon
- Werther (CD, 2012), Deutsche Grammophon
- Così fan tutte (CD, 2013), Deutsche Grammophon
- L'elisir d'amore (DVD, 2014), Deutsche Grammophon
- Die Entführung aus dem Serail (CD, 2015), Deutsche Grammophon
- Treasures of Belcanto (CD, 2015), Deutsche Grammophon
- Messiah (CD, 2016), with the Mormon Tabernacle Choir and Orchestra at Temple Square
- Le nozze di Figaro (CD, 2016), Deutsche Grammophon
- O Come Little Children (2017)
- Duets (CD, 2017), Deutsche Grammophon
- La clemenza di Tito (CD, 2018), Deutsche Grammophon
- Feliz Navidad (CD, 2018), Deutsche Grammophon
- Die Zauberflöte (CD, 2019), Deutsche Grammophon
- Serenata Latina (CD, 2020), Deutsche Grammophon

== See also ==
- Plácido Domingo
- Juan Diego Flórez
- Anna Netrebko
