= Agustín Pérez Soriano =

Spanish composer

Agustín Pérez Soriano (28 August 1846, Valtierra, Navarra - 27 February 1907, Madrid) was a Spanish composer.

His best-known works are comic zarzuela including El guitarrico, premiered 12 October 1900 at the Teatro de la Zarzuela, Madrid.
