= Luisa Fernanda (zarzuela) =

Spanish play

- Zarzuela by Federico Moreno Torroba
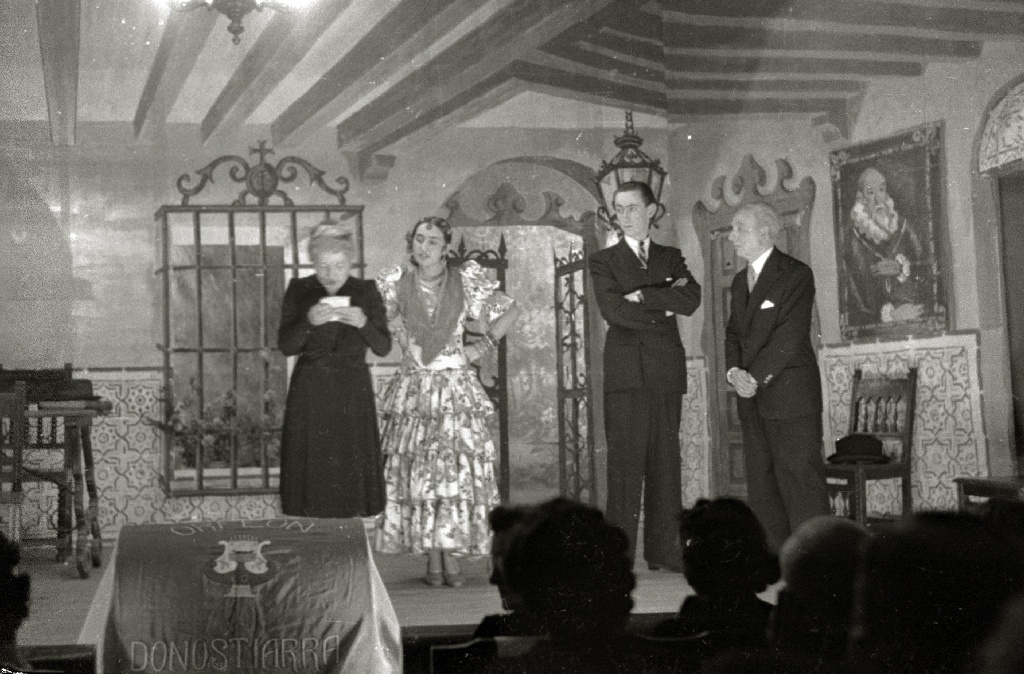
- Performance by Orfeón Donostiarra, 1945
- Librettist: Federico Romero; Guillermo Fernández-Shaw
- Language: Spanish
- Premiere: 26 March 1932; Teatro Calderón (Madrid)

Luisa Fernanda is a romantic zarzuela in three acts by Federico Moreno Torroba. It has been performed more than 10,000 times. The Spanish-language libretto is by Federico Romero and Guillermo Fernández-Shaw. The first performance took place at Teatro Calderón (Madrid) on 26 March 1932. It was Moreno Torroba’s fourth zarzuela, his first to receive great acclaim.

== Roles ==
Rolws, voice types, premiere cast
Role	Voice type	Premiere cast, 26 March 1932
Luisa Fernanda	mezzo-soprano	Selica Pérez Carpio
Vidal Hernando	baritone	Emilio Sagi Barba
Duchess Carolina	soprano	Laura Nieto
Javier Moreno	tenor	Faustino Arregui
Mariana	mezzo-soprano	
Anibal	tenor	
Don Luis	baritone	

== Selected recordings ==
Year	Cast (Luisa Fernanda, Vidal Hernando, Carolina, Javier)	Conductor, opera house and orchestra	Label
2006	Nancy Herrera, Plácido Domingo, Mariola Cantarero, José Bros	Jesús López Cobos, Teatro Real Orchestra and Chorus	DVD: Opus Arte; Cat: 009478 00969
