= Pedro Halffter =

Spanish conductor and composer

Pedro Halffter Caro (born 1971 in Madrid) is a Spanish conductor and composer. He is artistic director of the Teatro de la Maestranza (Seville).

Born in Madrid, as the son of composer Cristóbal Halffter, he went to boarding school in Germany at the Schule Schloss Salem. After completing his German Abitur he studied conducting at the Hochschule für Musik in Vienna, receiving a degree in 1995. He has been the recipient of the Jugend musiziert Prize, Young Composers Prize of the Deutscher Musikrat (German Music Council, a member of the International Music Council), Young Conductors Prize of the European Union, as well as grants from the Juventudes de Madrid and the Banco de España, and a Fulbright scholarship for composition studies in New York.

== Selected recordings ==
- Pedro Halffter Las Campanas de Gran Canaria
