= Giacomo Zani =

Italian music conductor (1932–2021)

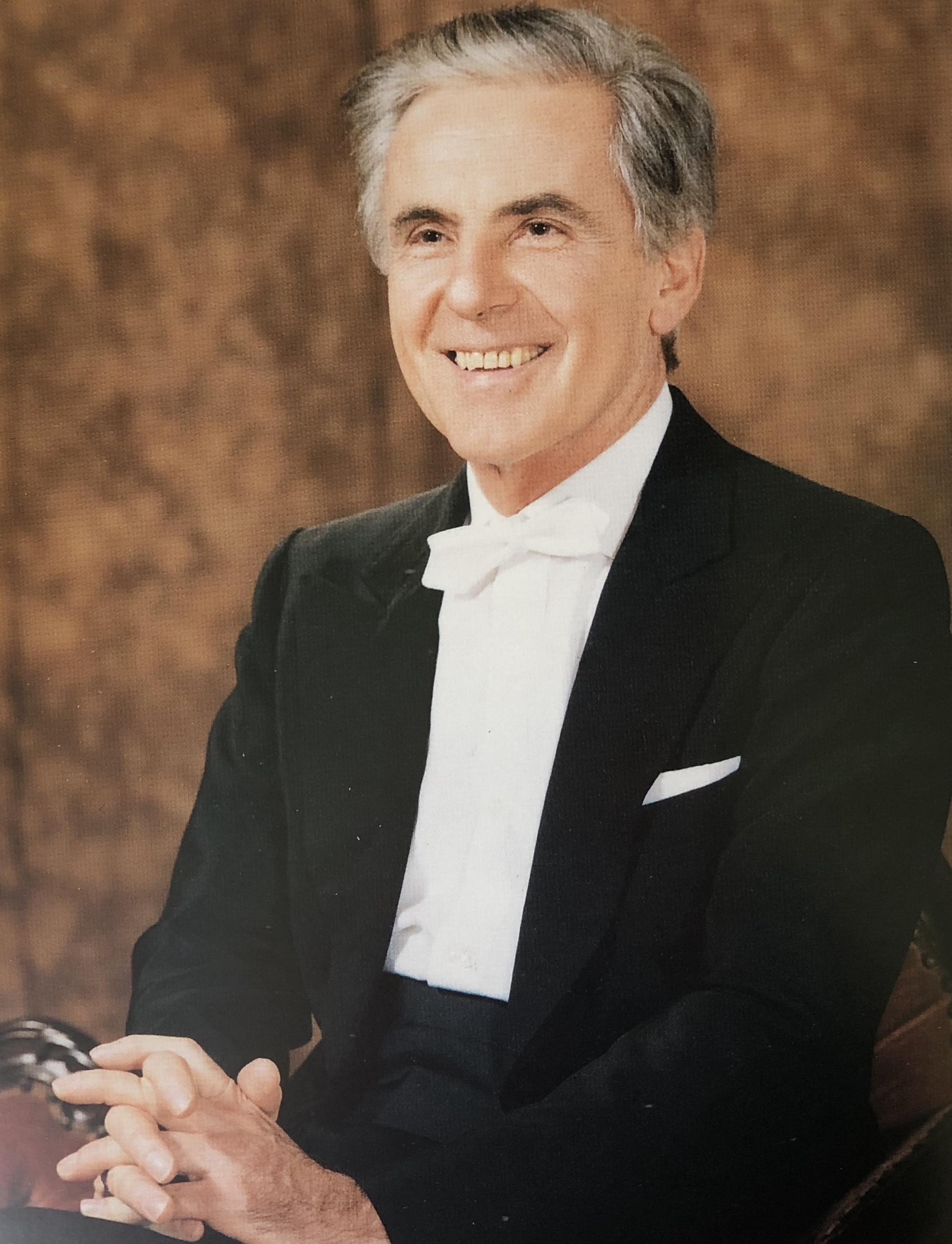
Giacomo Zani

Giacomo Zani (9 July 1932 – 17 June 2021) was an Italian conductor and musicologist.
