= Carlo Felice Cillario =

Argentine-born Italian conductor

Carlo Felice Cillario (photo with 1960 dedication)

Carlo Felice Cillario (7 February 1915 – 13 December 2007) was an Argentine-born Italian conductor of international renown.

He is considered one of the singers' favourite conductors, both in opera houses and in recording studios. During his long career he has conducted in all the major theatres of Europe, USA, South America and Australia. He has also been a major player in the creation and development of the Australian Opera.

== Biography ==
Early life and education

Born Carlos Felix Cillario in San Rafael, Mendoza, Argentina, he went to Italy with his family in 1923. There he began his musical education at an early age at the G.B. Martini Conservatory of Bologna, studying violin with Angelo Consolini and composition with Cesare Nordio. He graduated in 1932 with the Tonolla Prize, an award reserved for the most talented students. As a teenager, he performed in public concerts, earning a reputation as a promising violinist. In 1934, he won the prestigious Nicolò Paganini Prize at the National Competition for Violinists, an achievement that allowed him to perfect his skills with teachers such as Arrigo Serato at the Accademia Chigiana in Siena and the Accademia di Santa Cecilia in Rome, and to perform in numerous Italian cities throughout the 1930s. Among his various performances, he held an important concert in 1935 at the Quirinale in the presence of Princess Maria Giuseppina of Savoy. Despite his success as a violinist, in 1943, in Odesa, Ukraine, during a football match with some local boys, he suffered a wrist injury that pushed him to dedicate himself to conducting. Later, he realized that he could have completely regained control of the instrument, but decided to continue on the path he had started.

Debut, first years of conducting and return to Italy.

His debut as a conductor took place with Il Barbiere di Siviglia in Odesa in 1942, where for a short period of time he also taught violin at the city's conservatory. During the Second World War he returned to Argentina where he founded and conducted the Symphony Orchestra of the University of Tucuman, and over the years he toured several times in South America, including Buenos Aires and Mexico City.

After his return to Italy at the end of the war, he founded the Bologna Chamber Orchestra in 1946. From 1953 onwards he conducted numerous symphonic concerts in Bologna, including some with his wife and renowned pianist Vittoria Genoveanu. Subsequently, he made his operatic debut at the Teatro Comunale in Bologna with La dama di picche in 1957. In the 1950s and 1960s he was extremely active between the Angelicum in Milan, where he became resident director, and the Accademia di Santa Cecilia in Rome. He gradually specialized in conducting operas, conducting in the opera houses of Bologna, Rome, Turin, Florence, Parma, Venice, Milan and others. He soon made his debut in Europe, in Athens, Berlin, Oslo, Paris, Lisbon and numerous other cities.

International Consecration

In 1961 he made his debut in England, at the Glyndebourne Festival Opera in L'elisir d'amore, directed by Franco Zeffirelli, and in the United States at the Lyric Opera of Chicago in La forza del Destino, subsequently conducting Il barbiere di Siviglia, La Cenerentola, La favorita and La bohème. In 1964 he made his debut at the Royal Opera House in London (Covent Garden), at the express request of Maria Callas, conducting her for a return to the stage in the famous series of 7 performances of Tosca with Tito Gobbi, directed by Franco Zeffirelli, in what would later be considered one of the most celebrated concerts in the career of the "Divine". The concert represents one of the iconic moments in the history of opera: crowds of people had queued for days to see the singer, who at the end of the first opening night responded with 27 calls to the stage and an ovation that lasted forty minutes. The show took on an aura of legend, and was later broadcast on television.

In the same years, he directed several times in south America at the Teatro Colon in Buenos Aires. He returned to Covent Garden in 1965 to conduct Luciano Pavarotti and Renata Scotto in La Traviata, and in the same year made his debut at Carnegie Hall in New York, conducting Montserrat Caballé for the first time, becoming one of her favourite conductors, conducting her in numerous different collaborations including at La Scala in Milan (1971 - Maria Stuarda), in Madrid, New York, Barcelona and in his debut at Covent Garden in 1972 (La Traviata) with Nicolai Gedda and Victor Braun, and at the Metropolitan Opera House in 1973 (Norma). Cillario was later credited with persuading Caballé to sing the bel canto repertoire, for which she later achieved international recognition.

Cillario made his debut at the San Francisco Opera in 1970 (Tosca) and at the Metropolitan Opera House in New York in 1972 (La sonnambula). Between the 1960s and 1970s he conducted in all the major theatres in Europe and in numerous theatres in the United States and South America. Among other famous concerts, Tosca directed by Franco Zeffirelli at the MET in New York with Luciano Pavarotti and Montserrat Caballé.

He then conducted on numerous occasions leading artists in the history of world opera, including Luciano Pavarotti, Renata Tebaldi, Mirella Freni, Joan Sutherland, Renata Scotto, Luigi Alva, Franco Corelli and many others, and collaborated repeatedly with directors such as Luchino Visconti and Franco Zeffirelli

From the end of the 1980s, he radically reduced his European commitments, although he still dedicated himself to some collaborations, especially in Sweden and Norway. In particular, he consolidated an ongoing relationship with the Royal Swedish Opera in Stockholm and with the nearby historic Drottningholm theatre, where each performance included the use of 18th-century costumes, both for singers and musicians. The main reduction in European collaborations is probably due to the significant development of the collaboration with the Australian Opera.

Thirty-year relationship with Opera Australia

Together with Tito Gobbi, who involved him in a tour of the country, he made his debut in 1968 in Australia with the Elizabethan Opera Trust, in Adelaide, Melbourne and Sydney.

Cillario established a deep bond with Australia, returning for several years to conduct, but then interrupting the collaboration due to difficulties in coordinating these activities with the international career that had been consolidated in the seventies. The relationship intensified again starting from the eighties. In fact, he began a long and prosperous partnership with what later became the Australian Opera: over the course of thirty years he contributed to the development of the Australian musical environment, the orchestra, the musicians and the singers, transferring the experience consolidated by over thirty years of activity on all the most important stages in the world. However, he refused the role of permanent conductor, in order to be able to return freely to the European continent. He was then appointed principal guest conductor of the Sydney Opera House, to which he devoted much of his professional activity until the last years of his life. In 2000 he conducted Tosca on the opening date of a series of events dedicated to the Sydney Olympic Games. He retired in 2003 following a famous gala evening concluding his long career.

Private life and final years

In 1945, Cillario married the pianist Victoria Genoveanu in Bucharest, with whom he had two children. Despite his intense international activity, he always maintained a strong bond with Bologna and the city of Castel San Pietro Terme, where after his retirement he spent the last years of his life dedicating himself to composition and writing. Among his main works are Variazioni su un tema Egitto and Fantasia e Fuga per quartetto d’archi, and a series of memoirs on the most important artists, musicians and people he met during his career. The maestro passed away in Bologna on 7 December 2007 at the age of 92.

Legacy and recordings

He left behind a large recording heritage, including recordings of operas and live concerts. Some of his interpretations, such as Tosca at Covent Garden and Roberto Devereux with Caballé, are considered milestones in the history of opera. He is remembered as one of the Italian excellences best appreciated abroad.

Carlo Felice Cillario was one of the favorite conductors of singers, both in opera houses and in recording studios, and was one of the most important protagonists in the creation and development of the Australian Opera, leaving behind a legacy of musicianship and phrasing evident in his surviving music scores at the Opera Australia library.

Cillario's conducting style is demonstrated in three rare conductor-cam videos on YouTube, performed in the Sydney Opera House Pit, Joan Sutherland Theatre, of Opera Australia productions:

https://www.youtube.com/watch?v=aOq2ECtbV9w Macbeth Prelude, (Verdi) 1996 production

https://www.youtube.com/watch?v=nc-aZn6ZSQE playout to Act 1 from Turandot, Puccini 1999 production

https://www.youtube.com/watch?v=VivSO6C8Msc from the opening of Act 1, Boheme, Puccini 1996 production

== Sources ==
- Elizabeth Forbes, 'Carlo Felice Cillario: Opera Conductor', The Independent 24 December 2007.
- 'Carlo Cillario' (Obituary), The Daily Telegraph 21 December 2007.
