= El huésped del sevillano =

1926 zarzuela in two acts

El huésped del sevillano (The guest of the sevillano-inn) is a 1926 zarzuela in two acts with music by Jacinto Guerrero and a libretto by Juan Ignacio Luca de Tena with Enrique Reoyo.

It is set in the 16th century, and the anonymous guest at the inn is in fact Miguel de Cervantes.
