= Jacinto Guerrero =

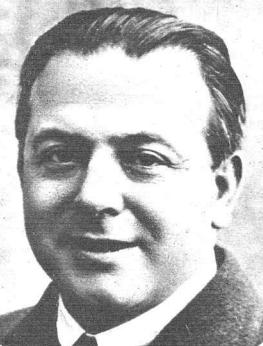
Composer Jacinto Guerrero

Jacinto Guerrero (16 August 1895 Ajofrín, Toledo, Spain – 15 September 1951 Madrid, Spain), was a prolific composer of zarzuelas and revues, as well as some orchestral compositions.

Guerrero was educated at the choir school in Toledo and Madrid Royal Conservatory. Amongst his best-known works are:

- La montería (The Hunt, 1923)
- Los gavilanes (The Sparrowhawks, 1924)
- El huésped del sevillano (The Guest at the Sevillano Inn, 1926)
- La rosa del azafrán (The Saffron Rose, 1930)

== Selected filmography ==
- Bound for Cairo (1935)
- Currito of the Cross (1936)
