= Pablo Sorozábal =

Spanish composer

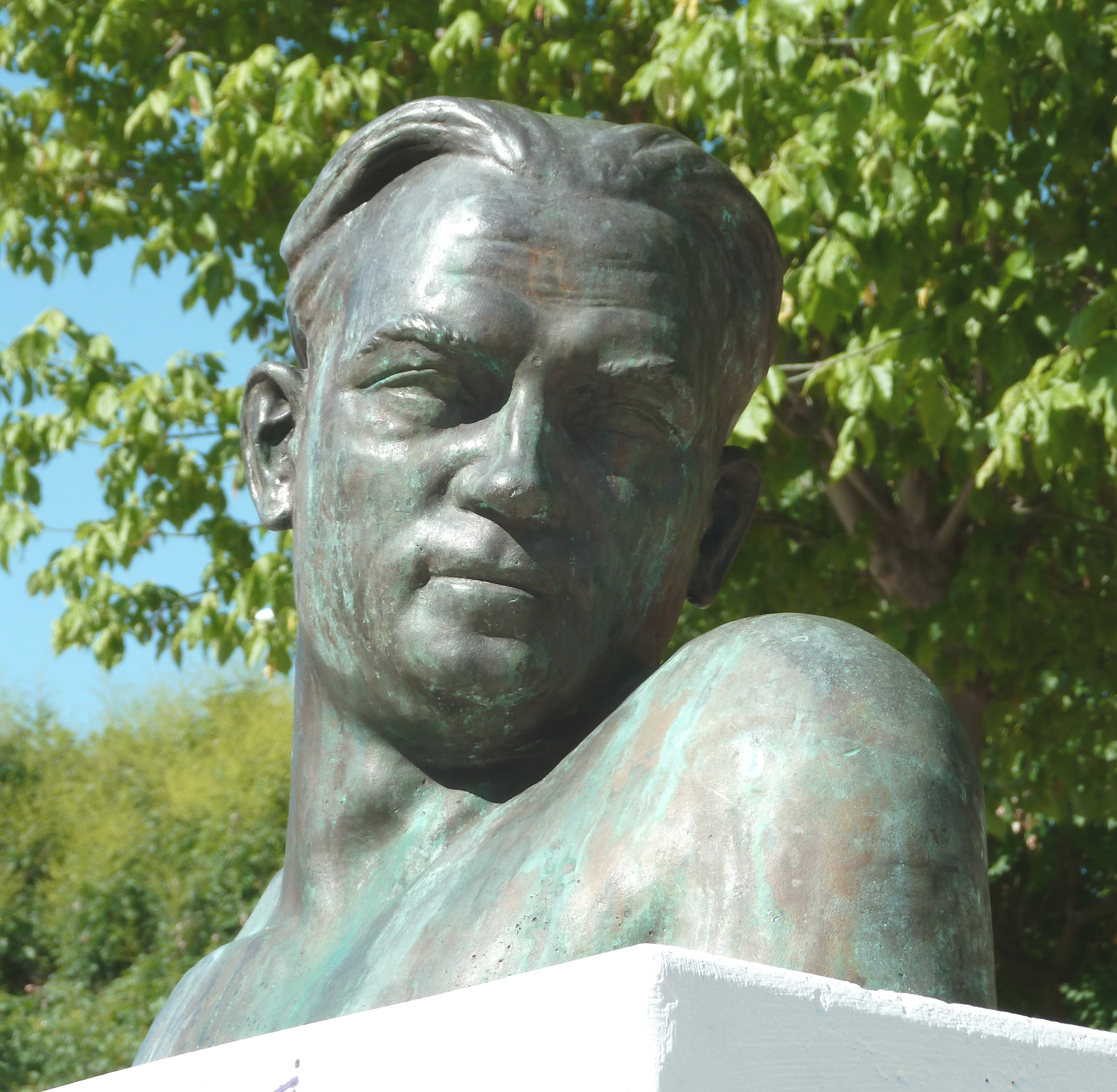
- Bust of Sorazábal in Madrid
- Born: Pablo Sorozábal Mariezcurrena; 18 September 1897; San Sebastián, Spain
- Died: 26 December 1988 (aged 91); Madrid, Spain

Pablo Sorozábal Mariezcurrena (18 September 1897 – 26 December 1988) was a Spanish composer of zarzuelas, operas, symphonic works, and the popular romanza, "No puede ser".

He was born in San Sebastián, in a working-class family. Trained in San Sebastián, Madrid and Leipzig; then in Berlin, where he preferred Friedrich Koch as composition teacher to Arnold Schoenberg, whose theories he disliked. It was in Germany that he made his conducting debut, and the rostrum remained at the centre of his working life. His Leipzig concert works include the choral Suite vasca (1923); Dos apuntes Vascos (1925) and Symphonic Variations on a Basque Theme (1927); of later works the funeral march Gernika for chorus and orchestra (1966) is outstanding. The Siete Lieder, 1929 settings of Heinrich Heine for mezzo-soprano and orchestra, are perhaps the finest works he produced in Germany. Two short but powerful compositions for chorus and orchestra, Maite (‘Our Lady’, from the 1946 film Jai-Alai) and ¡Ay, tierra vasca! (1956) retain their place in the hearts of his Basque countrymen.

Katiuska (1931) was his stage debut, and the twenty or so zarzuelas which followed combine lyric fire and inimitable orchestration with an unfailing sense of theatre. Best-loved are his classic madrileño comedy La del manojo de rosas (1934) and the “nautical romance” set on the Atlantic Coast La tabernera del puerto of 1936. The latter includes the romanza "No puede ser", made internationally popular when sung in the Three Tenors concerts by Plácido Domingo. His one-act verismo opera Adiós a la bohemia (from a short story by Pío Baroja) also retains its popularity in Spain.

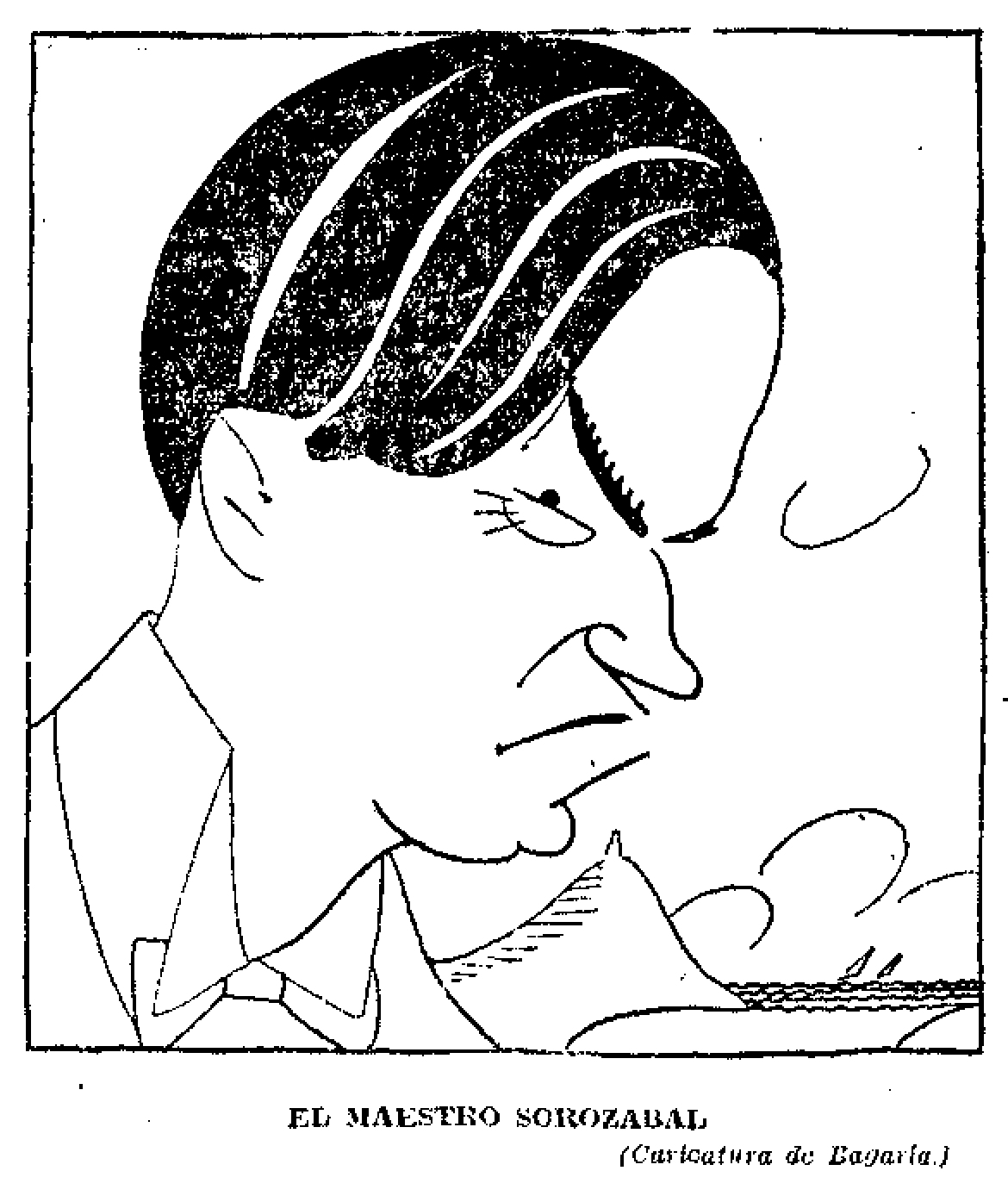
Caricature of Sorozábal, 1928

Sorozábal's liberal sympathies left him somewhat isolated after the Spanish Civil War, and many of his later zarzuelas were first seen outside the capital or in less prestigious Madrid theatres. They include the ambitious, allegorical romance Black, el payaso (1942) and the ski-sports musical Don Manolito (1943), both of which starred popular Basque soprano Pepita Embil.

Sorozábal also wrote scores for non-musical films, notably the classic Spanish film Marcelino Pan y Vino (1955).

His tenure as director of the Madrid Symphony Orchestra ended abruptly in 1952 when he was refused permission to conduct Shostakovich’s Leningrad Symphony; and though his musical comedy Las de Caín was premiered at the Teatro de la Zarzuela in 1958, the opera Juan José had to wait for its belated (and highly successful) concert premiere until February 2009, after a full production was suspended during rehearsals in Madrid during 1979. With his death in Madrid on 26 December 1988 the last chapter in the creative history of the romantic zarzuela came to an end. Sorozábal's theatrical vitality, musical wit and dramatic force are second to none in the history of zarzuela and rival the best of his German and Italian music theatre contemporaries, such as Kurt Weill.

== Sources ==
extract from Christopher Webber's biography on zarzuela.net with permission
