= Amadeu Vives i Roig =

Spanish-Catalan composer, writer and impresario (1871–1932)

Amadeu Vives
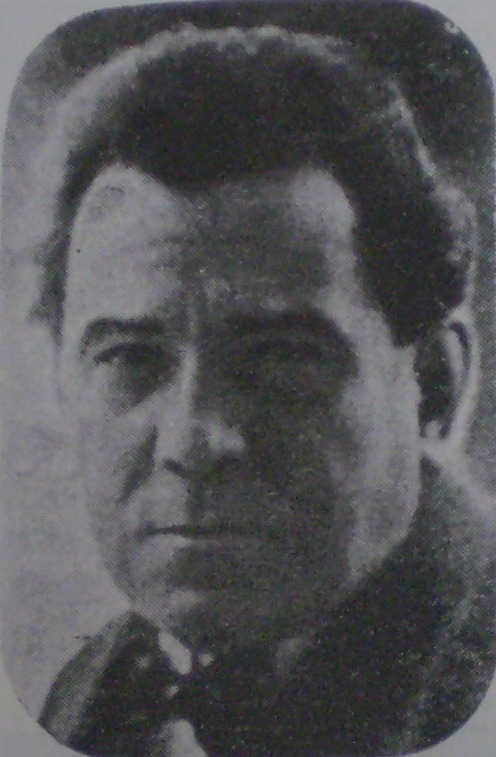
- Born: 18 November 1871; Collbató, Catalonia, Spain
- Died: 2 December 1932 (aged 61); Madrid, Spain
- Resting place: Montjuïc Cemetery, Barcelona
- Other names: Amadeo
- Education: Josep Ribera, Felipe Pedrell
- Occupations: Composer, writer and impresario
- Known for: Doña Francisquita
- Spouse: Montserrat Giner
- Children: one

Amadeu Vives i Roig (Catalan pronunciation: [əməˈðew ˈβiβəz i ˈrɔtʃ]; 18 November 1871 – 2 December 1932) was a Spanish musical composer, creator of over a hundred stage works. He is best known for Doña Francisquita, which Christopher Webber has praised for its "easy lyricism, fluent orchestration and colourful evocation of 19th Century Madrid—not to mention its memorable vocal and choral writing", and characterizes as "without doubt the best known and loved of all his works, one of the few zarzuelas which has 'travelled' abroad" .

The personal papers of Amadeu Vives are preserved in the Biblioteca de Catalunya.

== Biography ==
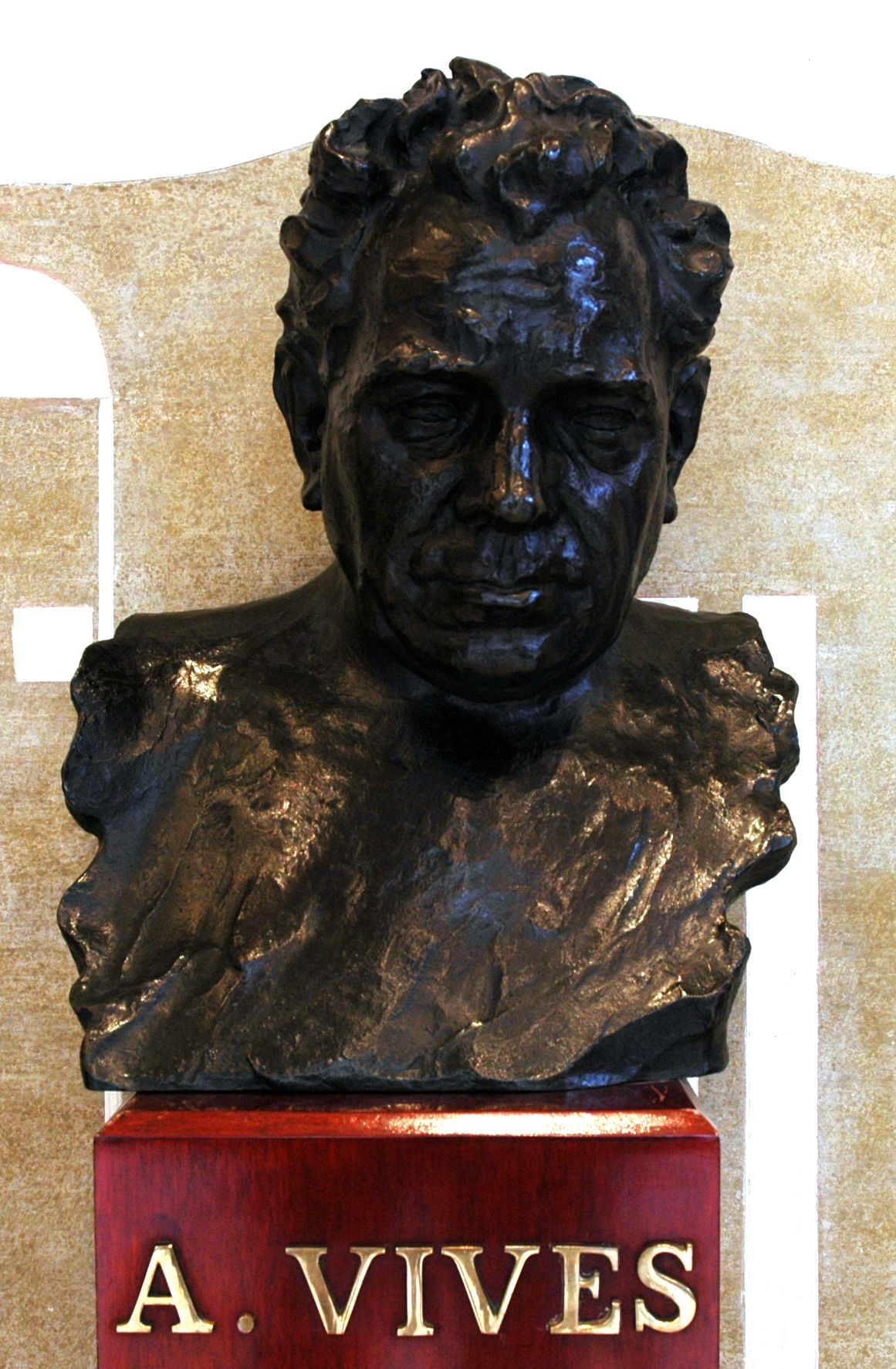
Bust of Amadeu Vives at the Palau de la Música Catalana

A Catalan, Vives was born in Collbató, near Montserrat. He studied in Barcelona under José Ribera, and in 1891 helped found the influential Orfeó Català choral society, a key element in the Catalan musical renaissance. He then became an early pupil of Felipe Pedrell, a fundamental figure of 20th century Spanish music. He soon moved to Madrid, where he lived the rest of his life, first publishing a series of concert works, solo and much-loved choral songs before turning to the zarzuelas on which his fame rests.

Before turning to zarzuela, Vives wrote a successful Catalan-language stage play, Jo no sabia que el món era així ("I didn't know the world was like this", 1929) and an ambitious four-act opera Artús (1897, Barcelona) based on Sir Walter Scott. A year later, his first zarzuela, the one-act (género chico) La primera del barrio, was produced at the Teatro de la Zarzuela in Madrid. His next several zarzuelas met some critical acclaim—particularly for Don Lucas del Cigarral (1899) and La balada de la luz (1900)—but his real critical and popular breakthrough came with the one-act Bohemios (1904). Vives drew on the same literary source as Giacomo Puccini's masterpiece La bohème, but his score shows French rather than Italian influences, as well as his own growing individuality.

Soon after, he wrote two one-act zarzuelas in collaboration with Gerónimo Giménez: El húsar de la guardia (1904) and La gatita blanca (1905) both remain in the repertory of zarzuela a century later, though other once-popular works, such as Los viajes de Gulliver (1911), have faded. Many of his other works continue to be performed: the operetta La generala (1912; set in "Oxford and Cambridge"); the pastoral opera Maruxa (1914, without spoken parts); Doña Francisquita (1923), which Webber characterizes as perhaps the finest of all three-act género grande zarzuelas" and "without doubt the best-known and -loved of all Vives' works"; and La villana (1927). His last works, the two-act zarzuelas Los flamencos (1928) and Noche de verbena (1929) "have not proved so durable" (Webber); the comedia lírica Talismán (1932) was a critical success, but a commercial failure. Vives died in Madrid in 1932.

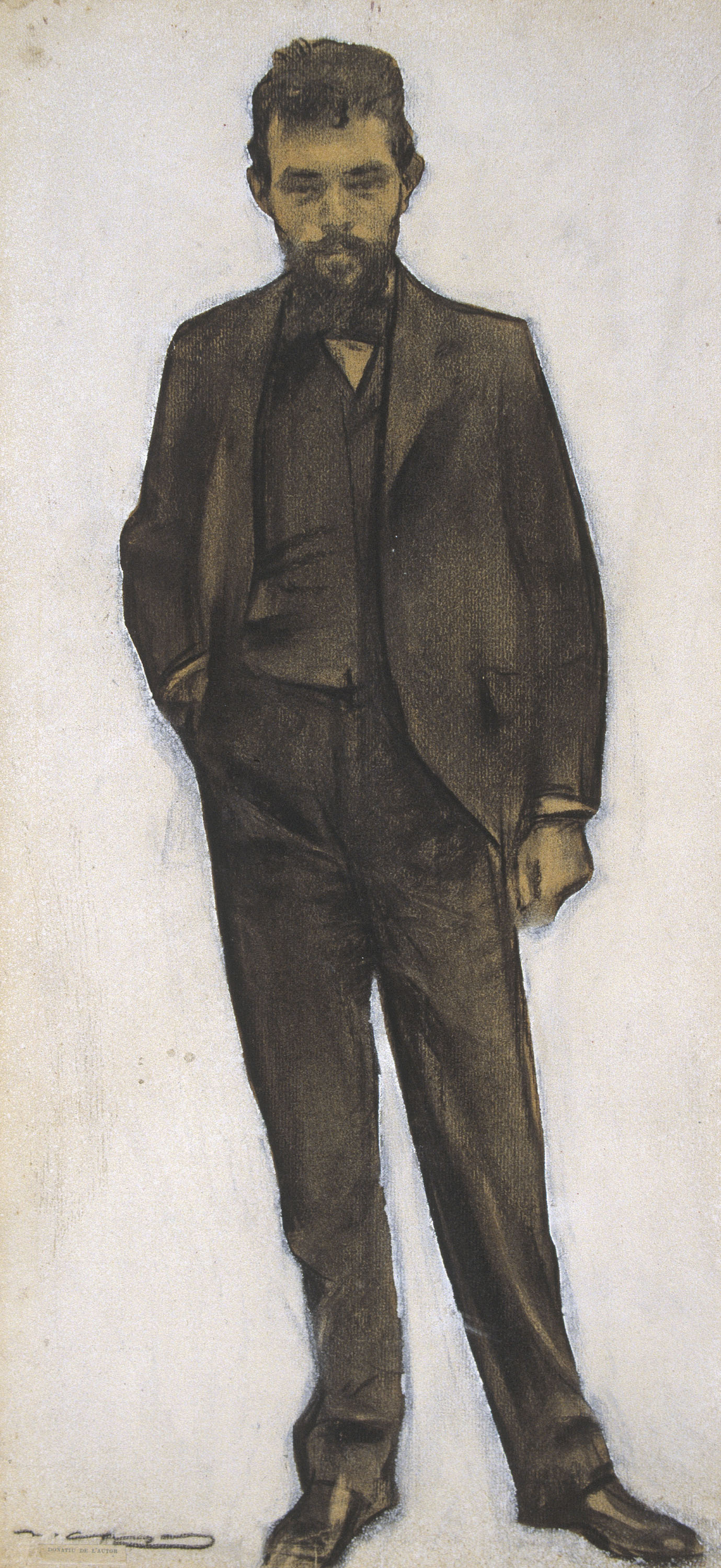
Amadeu Vives seen by Ramon Casas (MNAC).

== Reputation ==
Isaac Albéniz once said that if Vives had sought to compose with a universal accent, he could have undoubtedly have been a major international figure. He aspired to become a symphonic composer, but never pursued that ambition. Webber remarks that "Perhaps he simply lacked the confidence to try. His autobiographical book Sofía (1923) paints a revealing picture of a nervous figure," suffering from several physical disabilities, and "never entirely satisfied with being 'just' the leading zarzuelero of his day."

== Operas ==
- Artus (1895)
- Don Lucas del Cigarral (1899)
- La balada de la luz (1900)
- Euda d'Uriach (1900)
- Los amores de la Inés (1902, with Manuel de Falla)
- Bohemios (1904)
- El húsar de la guardia (1904)
- El arte de ser bonita (1905)
- La gatita blanca (1906)
- Juegos malabares (1909)
- Colomba (1910)
- La generala (1912)
- El carro del sol (1911)
- Maruxa (1914)
- La balada de Carnaval (1919)
- Doña Francisquita (1923)
- La villana (1927)
- Talismán (1932)

== Bibliography ==
- Regidor Arribas, R.; Granados, V. Articles contiguts al Programa de la representació de Doña Francisquita al Teatro de la Zarzuela de Madrid. 1998 (in Spanish)
- Hernández Girbal, F. Amadeo Vives. El músico y el hombre. Madrid: Ediciones Lira, 1971. (in Spanish)
- Lladó i Figueres, Josep M. Amadeu Vives (1871-1932). Publicacions de l'Abadia de Montserrat, 1988. (Biblioteca Serra d'Or). ISBN 84-7202-950-6. (in Catalan)
- Marco, Tomás. Historia de la música española. Siglo XX. Madrid: Alianza, 1983. ISBN 84-206-8506-2 (in Spanish)
- Mendoza, Cristina. Ramon Casas, Retrats al carbó. Sabadell: Editorial AUSA, 1995. 282 p. ISBN 84-8043-009-5 (in Catalan)
- Sagardía, Angel. Vives. Barcelona: Edicions de Nou Art Thor, DL 1982. (Gent Nostra; 20). ISBN 84-7327-059-2 (in Catalan)
