= Ángeles Gulín =

Spanish operatic soprano

Ángeles Gulín (14 February 1939 – 10 October 2002) was a Spanish operatic soprano particularly associated with early Verdi works.

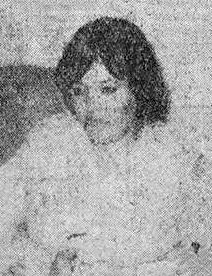
Gulín in 1970

== Life and career ==
Born María de los Ángeles Gulín Domínguez in Ribadavia, Spain, she moved with her family at the age of eight to Montevideo, Uruguay, where she studied singing with her father, who became a local music director who organized concerts in parks. She made her operatic debut there in 1963, as the Queen of the Night in The Magic Flute, as last minute replacement. She then returned to Europe where she sang mostly in Spain and Italy in roles such as Lucia in Lucia di Lammermoor, Gilda in Rigoletto and Violetta in La traviata.

After winning the Busseto Verdian Voices Competition in 1968, she turned to more dramatic roles and specialized in early Verdi works. Gulín's repertoire included Oberto, Nabucco, I due Foscari, Giovanna d'Arco, Attila, Alzira, Il corsaro, Luisa Miller, Stiffelio, Aroldo, I vespri siciliani, Simon Boccanegra, Un ballo in maschera, La forza del destino and Aida. Her repertoire also included roles in Rossini's La donna del lago, Bellini's Beatrice di Tenda and Norma, Spontini's Fernand Cortez, Meyerbeer's Les Huguenots, Ponchielli's La Gioconda, Rachmaninoff's Francesca da Rimini, de Falla's La vida breve, Giordano's Andrea Chénier and Puccini's Turandot. Of special interest are Gulín's records of zarzuelas (Spanish operettas). She appeared in "Los Gavilanes" (Alhambra WD-71432), "La Leyenda del Beso" (Alhambra WD-71463), "La del Soto del Parral" (Alhambra WD-71582) and "Me llaman la Presumida" (RCA/BMG 82876 501152).

Gulín's voice was rich and large, but capable of agility. Her career was cut short in 1987 due to serious health problems. She died in Madrid.

She was married to the baritone Antonio Blancas. In 1980, the couple appeared together in the world premiere of Federico Moreno Torroba's opera, El poeta, with Plácido Domingo in the title role. Their daughter Ángeles Blancas Gulín is also a soprano, who has herself had a distinguished career, including in roles that her mother sang.

She was rediscovered through the appearance of several recordings of her live performances.

== Sources ==
- Guide de l'opéra, Roland Mancini and Jean-Jacques Rouveroux, Fayard, 1995.
