= El poeta =

Spanish opera by Federico Moreno Torroba

- Opera by Federico Moreno Torroba
- Language: Spanish
- Premiere: 19 June 1980; Teatro de la Zarzuela, Madrid

El poeta is a Spanish opera composed by Federico Moreno Torroba. It premiered at the Teatro de la Zarzuela in Madrid, Spain on 19 June 1980, starring Plácido Domingo, Ángeles Gulín, and Carmen Bustamante. The idea of a new opera had originally been suggested to Moreno Torroba by Domingo. El poeta would be the 89-year-old composer's last major work for the stage.

== Background ==
Federico Moreno Torroba was one of the most prolific composers of Spanish zarzuelas and modern classical guitar music, but had only worked on operas early in his career. In 1946, he formed a traveling zarzuela company with baritone Plácido Domingo Ferrer and his wife Pepita Embil. Decades later, he was contacted by their son about a possible operatic collaboration. Moreno Torroba recalled in 1980: "Three years ago, in Bilbao, I met our great tenor Plácido Domingo, whom I had not seen since he was three years old. I was great friends with his parents, Pepita Embil and Plácido Domingo, Sr., and our great singer suggested that I write an opera." Domingo encouraged the composer to write an opera about Spanish painter Francisco Goya. Moreno Torroba, however, felt that the life of nineteenth-century poet José de Espronceda would be a better operatic topic. They both agreed that José Méndez Herrera, whom Moreno Torroba praised for his "magnificent poetic spirit," should write the libretto.

== Performance history ==
El poeta received its premiere on 19 June 1980 at Madrid's Teatro de la Zarzuela, where Moreno Torroba had worked on many previous occasions. It was performed as part of the theater's seventeenth Festival of Opera. The music was largely praised and the composer and Domingo, as the title character, received large ovations. Critics, however, almost universally panned the libretto as inferior. Domingo also believed the libretto to be "weak and superficial" and regretted that it failed to convey the real Espronceda's fascinating and profound life. Although the opera was well received by the public, after its initial run of three performances, it was not revived.

== Roles ==
Role	Voice type	Premiere cast, 19 June 1980 (Conductor: Luis Antonio García Navarro)
José de Espronceda	tenor	Plácido Domingo
Carmen Osorio	soprano	Ángeles Gulín
Teresa Mancha	soprano	Carmen Bustamante
Alfonso	baritone	Antonio Blancas
Colonel Mancha	bass	Julio Catania

== Synopsis ==
José de Espronceda is a Romantic poet, who is exiled from Spain for his liberal beliefs and intrigues against Ferdinand VII. While abroad he falls in love with Teresa Mancha, but Carmen Osorio is also in love with him. After he rejects Carmen on three occasions, she murders her rival Teresa.

== Musical analysis ==
In El poeta, Moreno Torroba departed from his usual zarzuela style of composition. Unlike in zarzuelas, he wrote the opera as a through-composed piece without the interruptions of dialogue or distinct arias, duets, and ensembles. It was also more dissonant than typical of his style. American composer George Gershwin, in particular, influenced Moreno Torroba in this opera. Spanish critic Antonio Fernández-Cid remarked on the noticeable influences of both Gershwin and Puccini in the opera's score and praised the composer for his subtle "tone color, harmony, structure, and use of solos and tuttis." Other critics found a similarity with the music of Gian Carlo Menotti and Leonard Bernstein.

Some reviews commented especially on Moreno Torroba's old-fashioned style of composing. The critic for Opera News claimed that the score exhibited an "arch-romanticism out of date for three or four generations." At the same time, she noted: "Vocal lines were full of melody and eminently singable, pacing was varied and orchestration thoroughly professional." Speight Jenkins, writing in Musical America, stressed similar points. He wrote: "Moreno Torroba's music suggested a time warp: the composer seemed to be creating as Giordano might have and in no case were there harmonies which suggested the music of this century. The surprise was the honesty of the writing; most 'romantic' music composed in 1980 suggests a febrile Puccini, with the vivid color removed. On first hearing, Moreno Torroba's work sounded real and passionate, with the melodies effective though not quite overwhelming enough."

== Recordings ==
No officially released recordings of El poeta exist. However, the world premiere performance of the opera was televised.
