= Plácido Domingo Ferrer =

Spanish singer (1907–1987)

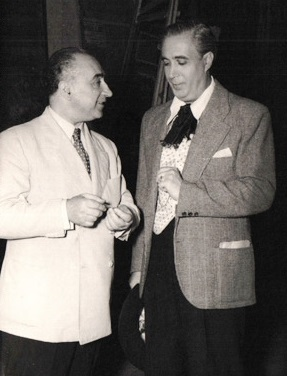
- Plácido Domingo Ferrer (right) with composer Federico Moreno Torroba backstage at the Teatro de la Zarzuela in Madrid, 1946
- Born: Plácido Domingo Ferrer; 8 March 1907; Zaragoza, Spain
- Died: 22 November 1987 (aged 80); Mexico City, Mexico
- Spouse: Pepita Embil (m. 1940)
- Children: 2, including Plácido Domingo
- Relatives: Plácido Domingo Jr. (grandson); Marta Ornelas (daughter-in-law)

Plácido Domingo Ferrer (8 March 1907 – 22 November 1987) was a Spanish zarzuela baritone and father of popular operatic tenor Plácido Domingo. Half Catalan and half Aragonese, he grew up and made his early career in Zaragoza, the capital of Aragon. He frequently toured Spain with his soprano wife Pepita Embil. In late 1948, they permanently moved to Mexico, where they successfully ran their own zarzuela company. He also appeared in recordings and on Mexican television.

== Biography and career ==
=== Family background and youth ===
Plácido Domingo Ferrer was born in Zaragoza, Spain on 8 March 1907. His mother, María Ferrer Ripol, originally came from the small Aragonese town of La Codoñera in the province of Teruel. As a young woman she moved to Barcelona to find work. There she met her future husband, Pedro Domingo, who was born in Tordera, Catalonia. They moved to Zaragoza, where they bought a restaurant and had three children, Plácido, the oldest, Pedro (known as Perico), and Henriqueta. When her husband died at age 30, she was left to raise their children and run the restaurant by herself. She made sure that her children studied music theory and learned to play instruments. The family would gather to sing together. Her son Plácido, who was only ten when his father died, played the violin from childhood. As a young man, he studied music at the conservatory in Zaragoza with maestro Teodoro Ballo, an Aragonese violinist, composer, and conductor and the founder of the conservatory. Domingo eventually performed in zarzuela and opera orchestras as a violinist prior to becoming a professional baritone.

=== Career in zarzuelas ===
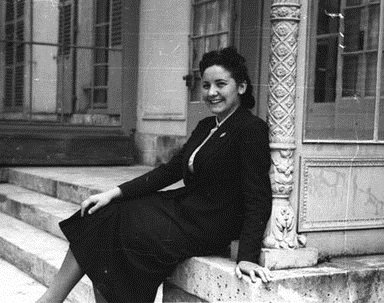
His wife, Pepita Embil, as a choral soloist in France in June 1939, less than a year before they married

Domingo debuted as a singer at the Parisiana Theater of Zaragoza with the work, Los gavilanes. He was heavily influenced by Aragonese tenor Miguel Fleta, whose famed diminuendo and pianissimo he tried to imitate. A light-voiced lyric baritone, he was repeatedly encouraged to study in Germany to be a Wagnerian heldentenor, but he did not want to live so far away from his family. He spent the years of the Spanish Civil War (1936-1939) almost trapped in Zaragoza performing in local theaters as part of the zarzuela company, Teatro Ambulante en Campaña. After the war, he moved with the company to Madrid, where he appeared with great success in Pablo Luna's Molinos de viento. He also began to frequent the Café Castilla on Infantas Street in Madrid. There he had the opportunity to meet great artists, librettists, impresarios, and musicians. At one of these gatherings, he met the singer Pepita Embil. Not long afterwards they performed together in Federico Moreno Torroba's Sor Navarra at the Gayarre Theater in Pamplona. They married in April 1940 and soon formed part of the company Aces Líricos headed by Antonio Medio. With this company, they toured over almost all of Spain.

In 1946, as part of Moreno Torroba's zarzuela company, they embarked for Mexico, eventually taking with them their two children, Plácido and Mari Pepa. They toured throughout Latin America, but it was in Mexico where they had the most success, so they decided to make their home there. After that they formed their own zarzuela troupe, the Domingo-Embil Company, and for more than twenty years they toured around performing in the best theaters in the Americas, including in New York. On one tour, he sang while he had a cold and permanently damaged his voice. Afterwards, he shifted his focus to smaller acting roles with less singing required. In a 1958 article, a leading Mexican theatrical critic remarked on how the "veteran baritone" Domingo had become "an excellent comic bass." He also worked as a stage director during this time. He eventually became a Mexican citizen.

=== Later years and death ===
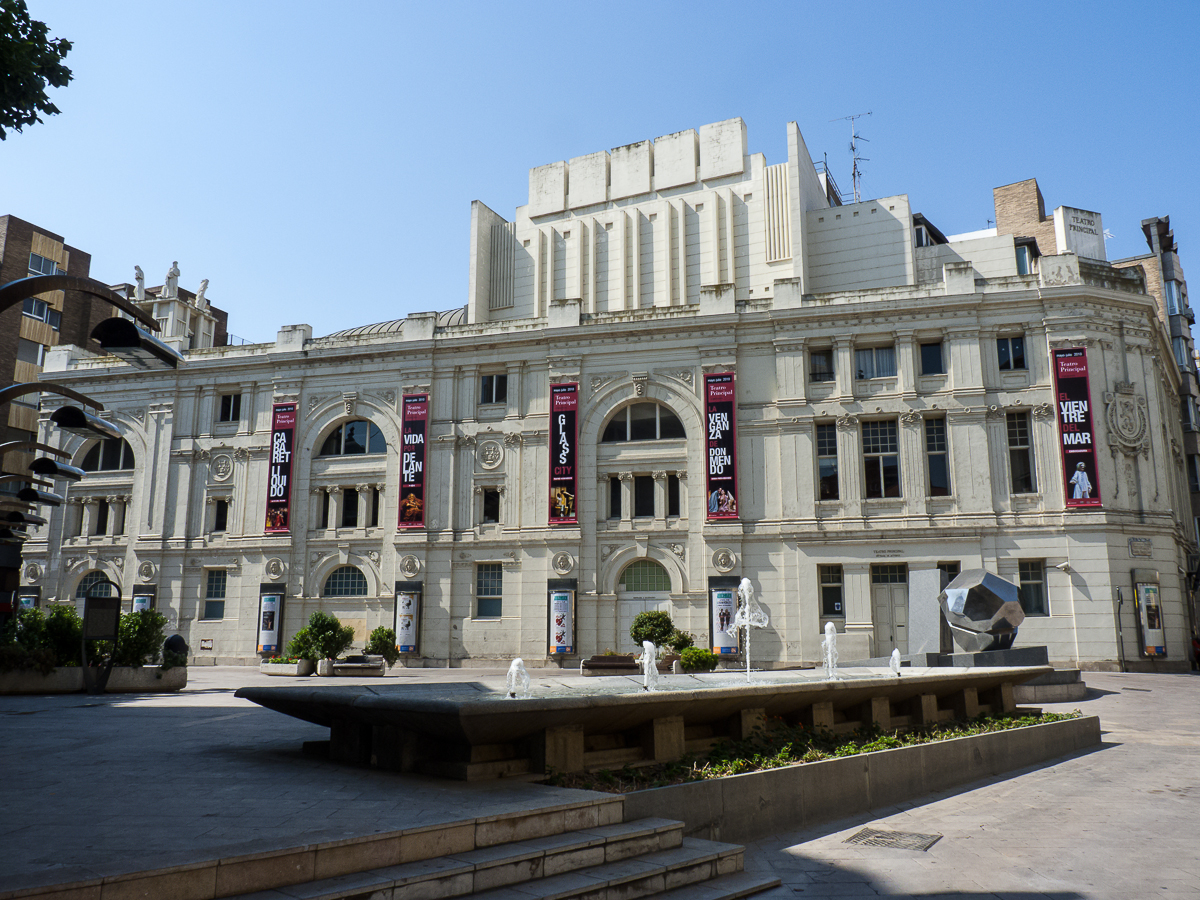
The Teatro Principal de Zaragoza, where Domingo often performed

In 1966 Domingo and Embil returned to Spain to go on tour with José de Luna's company. Upon their return to Mexico, they recorded several zarzuelas for channel 2 on television. Domingo retired from performing regularly in the late 1960s. His last appearance on stage was on 11 January 1975 at the Liceu in Barcelona in Amadeo Vives' zarzuela Doña Francisquita, conducted by his son Plácido. The 67-year-old Domingo sang the bass role of Don Matías. In the 1980s, he and his son made an American Express commercial together for Mexican television. He died on 22 November 1987 at the Hospital Español in Mexico City after suffering a heart attack. He was eighty.

== Legacy ==
Ángel Anadón, director of the Teatro Principal de Zaragoza, later remembered him as "a very versatile baritone who knew all the zarzuelas." Domingo was especially known for his performances as Don Vidal Hernando in Moreno Torroba's Luisa Fernanda. His son, Plácido, recalled that Moreno Torroba claimed "no-one had ever sung the lines 'Ay mi morena, morena clara...' [from Vidal's romanza in Luisa Fernanda] so well and meaningfully as my father." The younger Domingo wrote in his autobiography that his own voice and that of his father bore an uncanny similarity to each other. He especially praised the "wonderful sense of line" and "beautiful legato and diminuendo" in his father's singing. Plácido Domingo has created the Don Plácido Domingo, Sr., Prize of Zarzuela as part of his Operalia singing competition in honor of his father. Each year the winner of the prize receives $10,000.
