= Pepita Embil =

Spanish soprano (1918–1994)

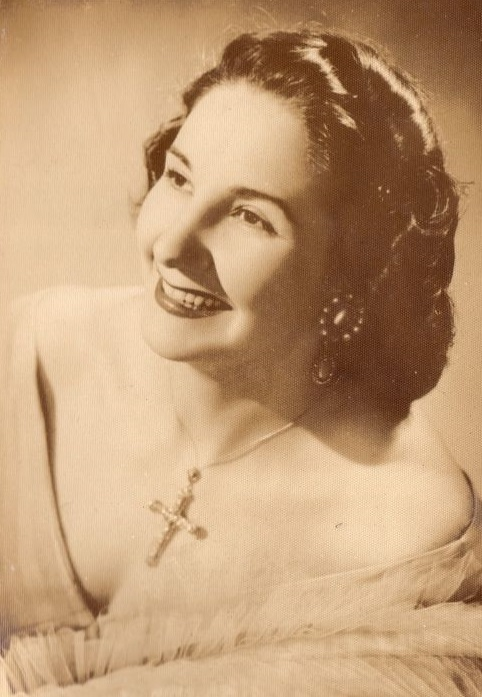
- Embil in the 1940s
- Born: Josefa Embil Echániz; February 28, 1918; Getaria, Gipuzkoa, Spain
- Died: August 28, 1994 (aged 76); Mexico City, Mexico
- Spouse: Plácido Domingo Ferrer (m. 1940; died 1987)
- Children: 2, including Plácido Domingo
- Relatives: Plácido Domingo Jr. (grandson); Marta Ornelas (daughter-in-law)

Josefa "Pepita" Embil Echániz (Basque: Josefa Enbil Etxaniz; February 28, 1918 – August 28, 1994) was a Spanish Basque soprano who starred in zarzuela and operetta productions throughout Spain and Latin America. Known as the "Queen of Zarzuela," she is especially remembered for her son, the internationally famous operatic tenor Plácido Domingo, whose early career she helped to nurture. Embil began her professional career singing as a soloist in choirs, including the Basque national choir, Eresoinka, which based itself in France during the Spanish Civil War. While still in her twenties, she appeared in the world premieres of several new zarzuelas. She collaborated with some of the most prominent Spanish composers of the 1940s, including Federico Moreno Torroba, Jacinto Guerrero, and Pablo Sorozábal. In late 1948, she moved to Mexico with her baritone husband, Plácido Domingo Ferrer. In Mexico they ran a successful zarzuela company of their own, which toured throughout the Americas. Over the course of her career, Embil made several recordings, primarily of zarzuela music.

== Biography and career ==
=== Early years ===
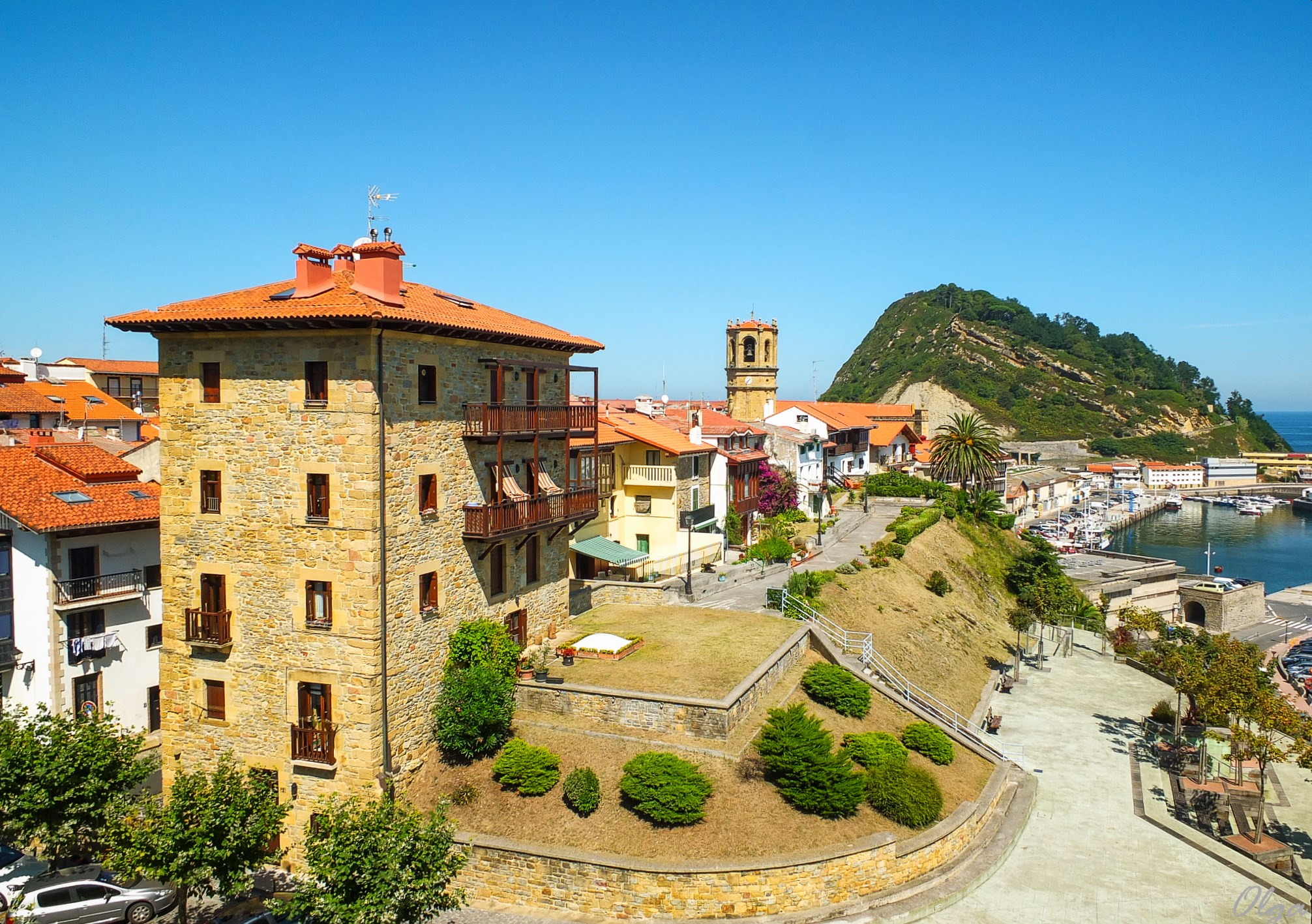
Embil's hometown of Getaria, Spain

Josefa "Pepita" Embil was born on February 28, 1918, in Getaria in the province of Gipuzkoa in the Basque Country of Spain. Her father, Arturo Embil y Lazcano, was a church organist and a lover of zarzuelas. He also liked to play piano reductions of operatic music for enjoyment. He and his wife, Germana Echániz Ostolaza, had five children: Francisco, Sebastián, Josefa (Pepita), Agustina, and Angel María. He died at age 45 in January 1930, when his daughter Pepita was 11 years old. La Constancia, a traditionalist Catholic Integrist party newspaper, announced his death and mentioned the "irreparable loss" his family and "political brothers" experienced. With the encouragement of her father, Pepita started singing lessons as a child and eventually attended the conservatory in San Sebastián, the capital of Gipuzkoa, where she studied with bass Gabriel Olaizola.

Embil began her singing career as part of the Euzko-Abesbatza (also spelled "Eusko Abezbatza"), a Basque choir directed by Olaizola. While the choir was in Barcelona for a celebration of the third anniversary of the Second Spanish Republic, she made her debut at the Liceu in a small part in Basque composer Jesús Guridi's opera, Amaya, on April 12, 1934. Only sixteen years old, she appeared with Olaizola, who had created the bass role of Miguel de Goñi in the opera's 1920 premiere. Afterwards, they again performed the opera in other theaters, including the Teatro Gayarre in Irun and the Teatro Arriaga in Bilbao. The latter performance with the Bilbao Symphony Orchestra was a success for the singers, including Embil, in front of a full house. Euzko-Abesbatza and another choir, the Juventud Vasca de Bilbao, both of which were involved in the growing Basque nationalist movement, organized the performance. In addition to her choral and operatic work, she also gave concerts. At one 1936 concert in Azpeitia with Olaizola, she sang a variety of music: a Basque number, an Italian song by Toselli, a Basque translation of Schubert's "Ständchen" ("Serenade"), and Siébel's aria, "Faites-lui mes aveux," in Italian from Gounod's opera, Faust. For the next few years she sang in various choirs, including the prestigious Orfeón Donostiarra, because as she later said, she needed to "work to live."

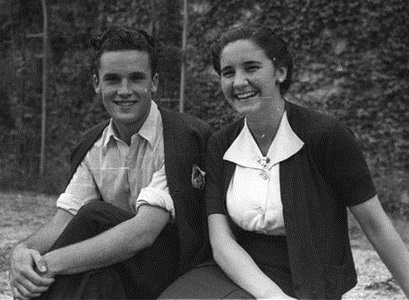
Embil with another member of Eresoinka in Belloy, France, 1938

Just days before the fall of his government to Franco's forces in 1937, the president of the Basque autonomous government, José Antonio Aguirre, worked with Embil's teacher Olaizola to form the Basque national choir and ballet, Eresoinka, with the goal of keeping Basque musical culture alive. Embil joined the newly formed choir and toured extensively with the group outside of Spain, often singing as a choral soloist, until it disbanded two years later. Supported by members of the Basque government in exile in France and elsewhere, members of Eresoinka chose Château Belloy in the French city Saint-Germain-en-Laye as their home base. The choir made its debut at the Salle Pleyel in Paris on December 18, 1937. The group also performed in Brussels, Antwerp, Rotterdam, the Hague, Amsterdam, and London. Although primarily a soprano throughout her career, she sang alto with Eresoinka. After her final choral concert in Paris in 1939, she remained in the city to study with an Armenian singing teacher.

=== Zarzuela career in Spain ===
With the Spanish Civil War at an end, she moved to Madrid and sought work in the numerous zarzuela companies there. She joined a touring company led by composer Federico Moreno Torroba. She soon appeared in his zarzuela Sor Navarra in Pamplona with baritone Plácido Domingo Ferrer, whom she had recently met for the first time at Madrid's Café de Castilla, a gathering place for the city's artists and musicians. They married on April 1, 1940, and early the following year they had their first child, Plácido. A year and half later, the couple had a daughter, Maria José (1942-2015), known as "Mari Pepa."

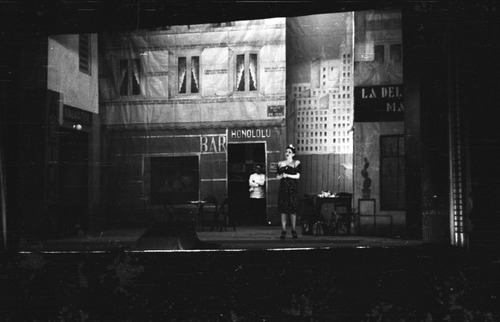
Embil in a production of the zarzuela, La del manojo de Rosas, in San Sebastián, 1942

Embil was asked to join the company of the Teatro Calderón in Madrid periodically from 1940 to 1945. The soprano and some friends from the Teatro Calderón founded the Ases líricos, a zarzuela company that had many successes over the course of the next several decades. Many of the members of the company were among the best zarzuela singers in the country. She and her husband performed all across Spain as part of the troupe, which was headed by singer and impresario Antonio Medio. Embil soon became one of the favorite singers of several leading Spanish composers, including Moreno Torroba, Pablo Sorozábal, and Jacinto Guerrero.

For her first season after the birth of her son, she worked with actor Salvador Videgain as part of the company of Maestro Quiroga at the Teatro Alcalá in Madrid. With that company, she appeared in numerous zarzuela productions, including the premiere of Quiroga's La reina fea in 1941. The following year she performed again at the Teatro Calderón, appearing in the premiere of Federico Cotó's operetta, El desfile del amor, with Antonio Medio. On the day before Easter 1943, she and Medio again sang together in the premiere of Pablo Sorozábal's zarzuela, Don Manolito, at Madrid's Teatro Reina Victoria. It was very well received. She also had a significant success in Sorozábal's Black el payaso. Together with Medio and under the auspices of Maestro Jacinto Guerrero, she performed in the premiere of Guerrero's Loza lozana at the Teatro Coliseum of Madrid later the same year. The two singers also appeared there in 1944 in the premiere of Jesús Romo's En el balcón de Palacio. It was only the composer's second zarzuela, coming two years after his promising El mesón del Pato Rojo. Embil sang the leading role, Lola la de Jerez, in the new zarzuela, which was an immediate hit. Her last world premiere in Spain occurred on November 22, 1944, in Guerrero's Tiene razón Don Sebastián at the Teatro Principal de Zaragoza. As a zarzuela written for two baritones—Medio and Domingo—it was considered a novelty. In May of the following year, she starred again in the farcical zarzuela at the Teatro Calderón. The genre was in decline by this time. Pepita Embil starred in some of the last great zarzuelas to be written.

=== Years in Mexico ===
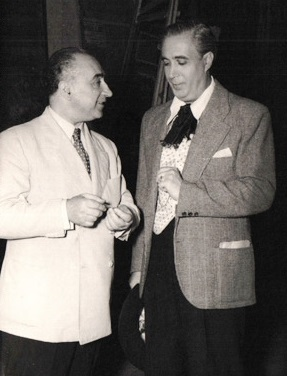
Her husband, Plácido Domingo Ferrer (right), with composer Federico Moreno Torroba in Madrid (1946)

After completing a series of tours around the Iberian Peninsula with the Ases líricos—appearing for example in La Gran Vía in Salamanca in 1946—she and her husband embarked on a tour of Latin America with a new zarzuela company Federico Moreno Torroba had recently formed. Soon after she first arrived in Mexico, a newspaper from Mexico City quoted one of Moreno Torroba's librettists, describing her as a "tall, young, and good looking" Basque with both a lyric and dramatic voice, who had shown herself to be a "grand figure" since she first appeared in Sor Navarra in Pamplona. While on tour, Moreno Torroba composed a Mexican zarzuela, El orgullo de Jalisco, that incorporated aspects of that country's music and traditions. In September 1947, Embil starred in the leading role of El orgullo de Jalisco to "warm and grateful" applause at its world premiere in Mexico City. The company's performances were popular among the publics of Puerto Rico, Cuba, Venezuela, and especially Mexico.

This success was decisive in leading the couple to form their own company and to settle permanently in Mexico in late 1948. Embil's sister, Agustina, looked after their children at her home in Getaria while they were away on tour. In January 1949, Agustina brought the children to Mexico to be with their parents, who soon recruited them to appear in various small parts in their zarzuela productions. Although they primarily performed at the Teatro Arbeu and the Teatro Esperanza Iris in Mexico City, Embil and Domingo frequently went on tour in Mexico and many other countries in Latin America. In the years following their move, they produced and starred in zarzuelas like Luisa Fernanda, La tabernera del puerto, Los gavilanes, and Marina. Even though Embil was primarily a zarzuela soprano, she also appeared in operettas, including Spanish language versions of Leo Fall's La princesa del dólar (The Dollar Princess) and Franz Lehár's El conde de Luxemburgo (The Count of Luxembourg) and La viuda alegre (The Merry Widow).

One Mexican critic wrote in 1949 that Embil and her co-star, Florencio Calpe, "provoked delirious and very loving ovations" during a performance of the zarzuela, El dúo de la africana. In 1951, Cuban movie star and singer Rosita Fornés hired Embil to alternate with her in her own company's stage productions. Domingo also worked with Fornés' company. For over two decades, the couple appeared before the Mexican public as both entrepreneurs and singers. Embil also gave recitations and concerts, sometimes accompanied by her son, Plácido, on the piano. In the mid to late 1950s, she frequently performed in zarzuelas with her son, who was just beginning a singing career of his own. She and her husband had given him his first singing lessons at home.

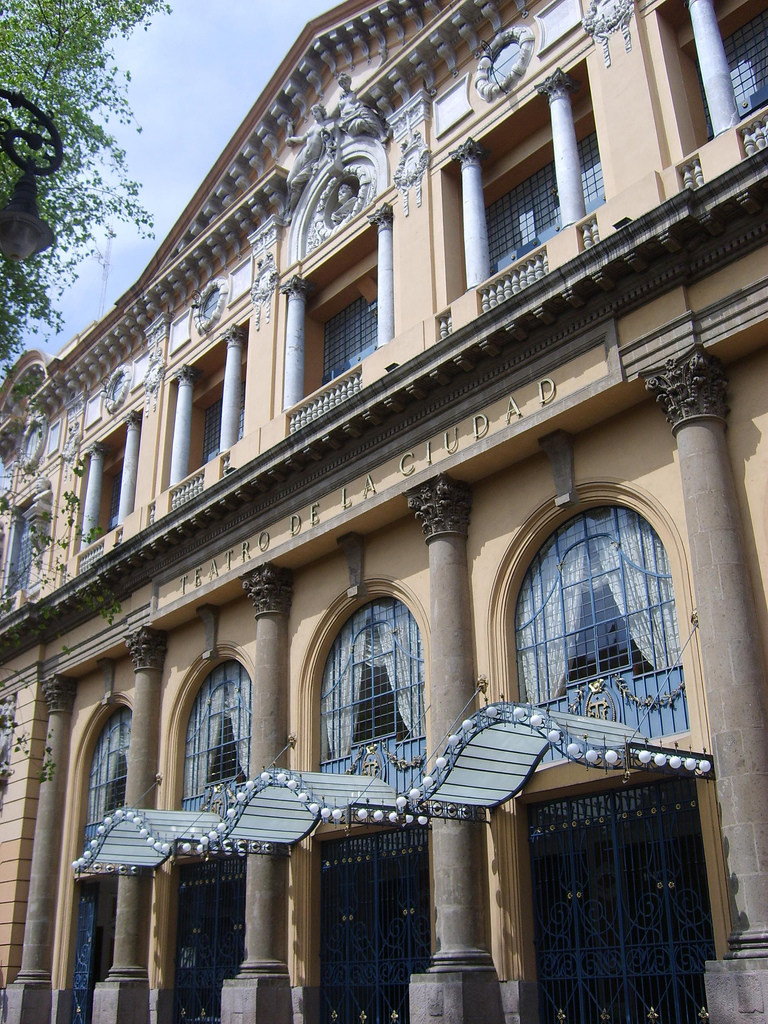
The Domingo-Embil Company frequently performed at Mexico City's Teatro Esperanza Iris, now the Teatro de la Ciudad

=== Later life ===
After years away, she and her husband accepted offers to perform again in Spain. In 1966, Embil and Domingo toured the Canary Islands and the north of Spain with José de Luna's zarzuela company. Once they returned to Mexico, they soon undertook another tour that took them to Costa Rica, Peru, and Venezuela. Later they sang at the Teatro de la Zarzuela in Madrid, recalling their early successes there in the 1940s. They returned to Barcelona during the 1974-1975 season. Conducted by their son, they performed in the zarzuela Doña Francisquita at the Liceu. She sang the mezzo-soprano role of Aurora la Beltrana. This was her final zarzuela performance and her farewell to the stage.

During the 1985 Mexico City earthquake, her brother Angel María Embil died, along with his wife, Francisca. In the same building, Embil's nephew Agustín García Embil and his three-year-old son, Julio Agustín García Pinilla, were also killed. Her husband, Plácido Domingo Ferrer, died of a heart attack in 1987 at age 80. The following year, the Teatro de la Zarzuela paid homage to her by dedicating a performance of Moreno Torroba's La chulapona to her. The theater's director, conductor Miguel Roa, wrote a poem to honor her on the occasion. In a 1990 tribute to her in San Sebastián, Embil and her son sang a duet together of the Basque song, "Aurtxoa Seaskan," with the Orfeón Donostiarra. Embil died on August 28, 1994, in Mexico City from a liver disease caused by a blood transfusion from twenty years earlier. She was 76 years old. She is buried next to her husband at the Panteón Español de México. The President of Mexico at the time, Carlos Salinas de Gortari, attended her wake.

== Legacy ==
Embil remains one of the best remembered zarzuela stars in the Americas. In 2012, one Spanish reporter noted that she is "considered one of the most expressive voices of zarzuela." In his memoirs, her son expressed the belief that she would have made a successful operatic soprano. He also wrote that she had once received an offer from the Liceu for a contract to sing operatic roles there, but declined because she was already a zarzuela star at the time. After her death, music critic Antonio Fernández-Cid praised her "warm and sweet 'spinto' soprano voice with contralto-like qualities."

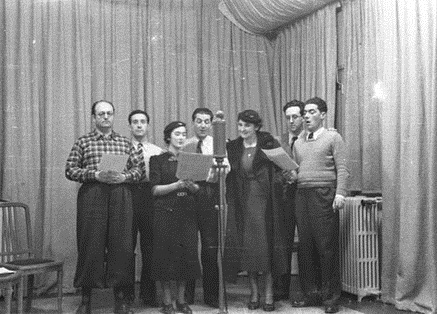
Embil (woman to the right) recording four Basque songs with Eresoinka members in Paris on February 3, 1938

In 1993, her son created the Pepita Embil Domingo Prize of Zarzuela in her honor, as part of his worldwide Operalia singing competition. Each year since then, a female singer has received the $10,000 prize for the quality of her performance during the zarzuela section of the competition. In 2002, the city of Pueblo, Mexico named one of its plazas, the Plaza Pepita Embil de Domingo, after her. A decade later Basque filmmaker Josu Venero created the Spanish-language documentary La reina de la zarzuela (The Queen of the Zarzuela) about Embil, which was shown on television in 2014. As part of the documentary, Venero followed Plácido Domingo as he returned to Embil's hometown of Getaria, where he spent part of his childhood. Domingo reminisced about his mother on camera and visited her birthplace, where he read from an official plaque about her. He toured other key locations from her early years as well. Her granddaughter, Mexican actress Maite Fernández Domingo, performs under the name Maite Embil in her honor.

== Recordings and television ==
Embil began her recording career as a Basque choral singer in the late 1930s, when she was around twenty years old. For the next few decades, she continued periodically to record excerpts and numbers from zarzuelas, operettas, and musicals, as well as popular Latin songs like Ernesto Lecuona's "Siempre en mi corazón." On her album, Fragmentos de operetas inmortales, she also recorded the operatic aria, "Un bel dì vedremo," from Puccini's Madama Butterfly. In the 1960s and 1970s, she filmed some popular zarzuelas with her husband for the Mexican television channel 2.

=== Partial discography ===
78 rpm records

Year	Album	Singers	Conductor, Ensemble	Label	Notes
circa 1938	Aurtxoa seaskan	Pepita Embil	Gabriel Olaizola, Chorale Basque Eresoinka	Disque Gramophone; Cat: K-8293	Genre: Basque lullaby; Origin: France; Billed as: "Mlle Pepita Enbil"
1942	Black, el payaso (Sorozábal)	Antonio Medio, Pepita Embil, Marcelino del Llano, Enriqueta Serrano, Manuel Alares, Manuel Gas	Pablo Sorozábal, Orquesta del Teatro Reina Victoria	Discos Columbia; Cat: R-14088 — R-14094; CA-15058 — CA-15064 (7 records)	Genre: Zarzuela (highlights); Origin: Spain; CD (2001): Blue Moon, Cat: BMCD 7534
1943	La tabernera del puerto (Sorozábal)	Pepita Embil, Enriqueta Serrano, Antonio Medio, Marcelino del Llano, Manuel Gas, Manuel Alares	Pablo Sorozábal, Orquesta del Teatro Reina Victoria	Discos Columbia; Cat: R-14095, R-14096, R-14103 (3 records)	Genre: Zarzuela (highlights); Origin: Spain; CD (1998): Blue Moon, Cat: BMCD 7518 (partial)

Long-playing records (LPs)

Year	Album	Singers	Conductor, Ensemble	Label	Notes
1958	Pepita Embil: Trozos inmortales de zarzuelas	Pepita Embil, Plácido Domingo Embil	Luis Mendoza López	RCA-Victor; Cat: MKL-1144	Genre: Zarzuela (selections); Origin: Mexico; Digital download (2012): Sony/RCA; Title: Trozos inmortales de zarzuelas
1960	Canciones inolvidables	Pepita Embil	Gonzálo Cervera	RCA-Camden	Genre: Latin pop/musicals; Origin: Mexico
1965	Fragmentos de operetas inmortales	Pepita Embil	Luis Mendoza López, Orquesta de Camara	RCA-Victor	Genre: Operetta; Origin: Mexico; Digital download (2012): Sony/RCA; Title: Pepita Embil
