= Marta Domingo =

Mexican opera soprano

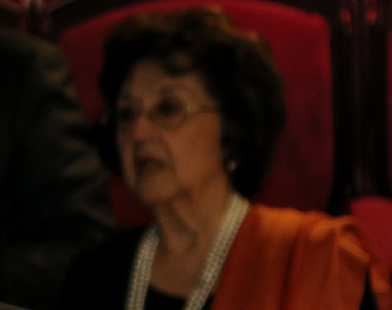
- Marta Domingo in Barcelona on 3 May 2015
- Born: Marta Ornelas; 1935 (age 90–91); Veracruz, Mexico
- Education: National Conservatory of Music
- Occupations: Stage director, soprano, designer
- Years active: 1954–present
- Spouse: Plácido Domingo (m. 1962)
- Children: 2, including Plácido Domingo Jr.
- Relatives: Plácido Domingo Ferrer (father-in-law); Pepita Embil (mother-in-law)

Marta Domingo (née Ornelas; born 1935) is a Mexican opera soprano, stage director and designer. In the 1950s and 1960s, she performed as a lyric soprano in Mexico and Israel. Since the 1990s, she has directed operas in Europe and North America. She is married to Spanish tenor Plácido Domingo, who has credited her with helping to guide his career.

== Early life ==
Marta Ornelas was born in Veracruz, Mexico. She studied at the National Conservatory of Music in Mexico City.

== Career ==
She started her career as an opera soprano for Opera Belles Artes in Mexico City. She then joined the Israel National Opera in Israel, where she was a lead soprano for two and a half years. During that period, she had leading roles in Così fan tutte, The Barber of Seville, Die Fledermaus, Carmen, Faust, Eugene Onegin, Don Giovanni, The Marriage of Figaro, La bohème, and Pagliacci.

After she retired as soprano to raise her children, she returned to opera as a director and designer. Beginning in 1991, she directed Samson et Dalila for the Teatro de la Ópera in Puerto Rico. The following year, in 1992, she directed Tosca at La Maestranza Theater in Seville, Spain. Rigoletto was her next project for the Los Angeles Opera in Los Angeles, California in 1993. She returned to Puerto Rico in 1994, where she directed The Barber of Seville. La Rondine, directed for the Oper der Stadt Bonn in Bonn followed in 1995 It was also presented by The Washington Opera in Washington, D.C. in the 1997-1998 season, and shown on the PBS television channel. Marta Domingo directed La Traviata in 1988 at the Opéra Royal de Wallonie in Belgium, and it was also given at the Los Angeles Opera in the 1998-1999 season. That same season, she also directed Sly, an opera by Ermanno Wolf-Ferrari, for The Washington Opera, a production which was also presented by the Metropolitan Opera in New York City four years later, in 2002.

In 2010, she was stage director of The Tales of Hoffmann at the Mariinsky Theatre in Saint Petersburg, Russia. She later directed it for The Washington Opera.

As director and designer of La Traviata for the Los Angeles Opera in 2014, the opera was seen at the Dorothy Chandler Pavilion in Los Angeles. The production incorporated the themes of the 1920s American flapper era, Chrysler sedan, and art deco style.

== Personal life ==
She is married to Plácido Domingo, an opera tenor whom she met in Mexico. They have two sons, including, Plácido Domingo Jr., who is a singer.
