= Israel National Opera =

Defunct Israeli opera company

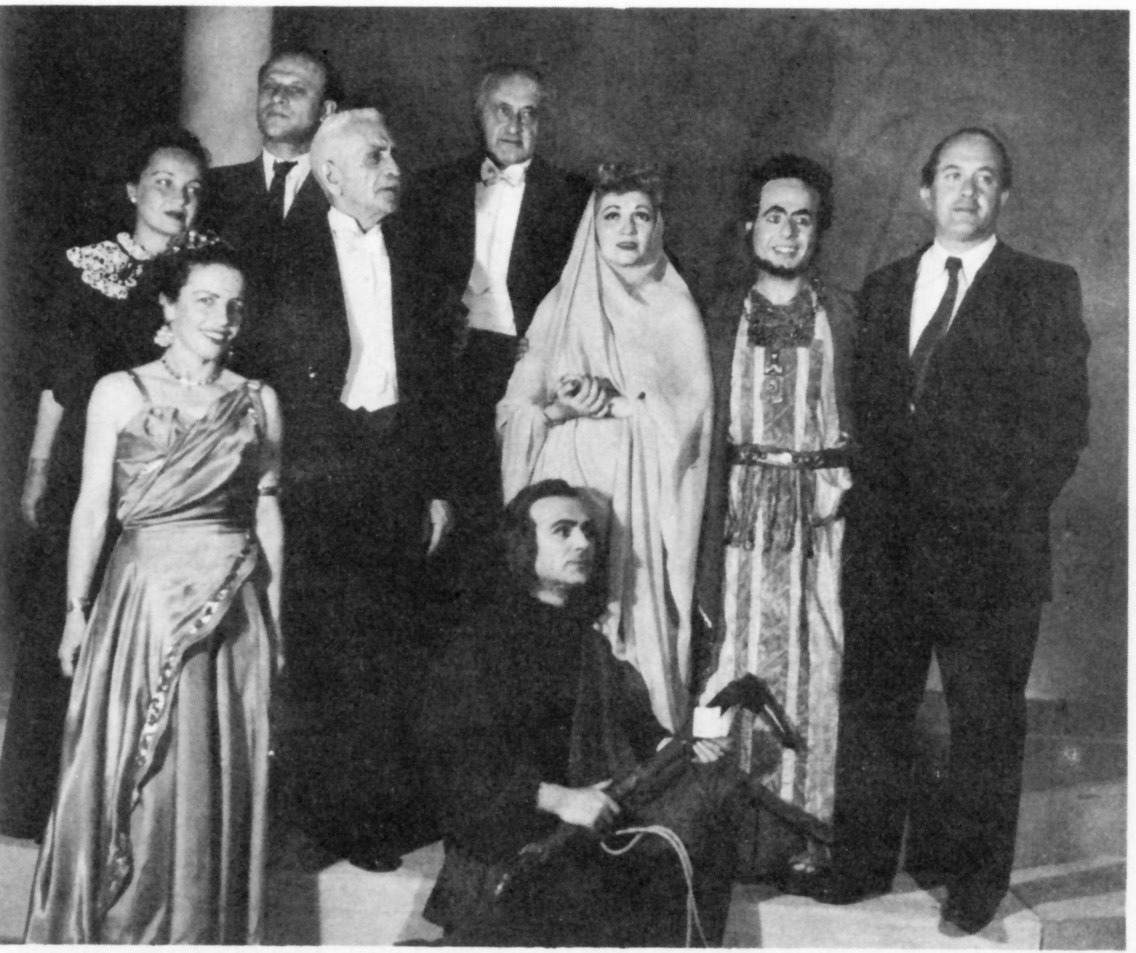
The cast, musicians, and crew at the premiere of Thaïs, the company's first production (May 1948)

Israel National Opera was Israel's principal opera company from its founding in 1947 until its closure in 1982.

== History ==
The Israel National Opera was founded by the American soprano Edis de Philippe. It staged over 1,000 performances throughout Israel by 1958. The scarcity of trained Israeli opera singers led the company to bring in international guest artists. During the early 1960s both Plácido Domingo and his wife Marta Ornelas were principal singers with the company. Lack of government funding led to the company's final closure in 1982 after several years of financial problems.

In 1985, the Council for Arts and Culture created The New Israeli Opera through a partnership between the Cameri Theatre of Tel Aviv and the Israel Chamber Orchestra.

== See also ==
- Music of Israel
- Culture of Israel
