= Federico Moreno Torroba =

Spanish composer and conductor (1891–1982)

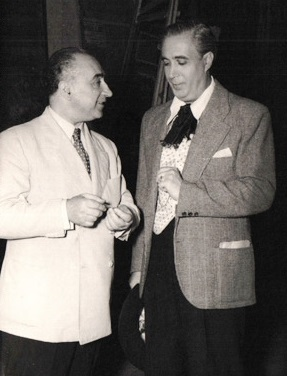
- Federico Moreno Torroba (left) with zarzuela baritone Plácido Domingo Ferrer backstage at the Teatro de la Zarzuela in Madrid, 1946
- Born: Federico Moreno Torroba; 3 March 1891; Madrid, Spain
- Died: 12 September 1982 (aged 91); Madrid, Spain
- Occupation: Composer

Federico Moreno Torroba (3 March 1891 – 12 September 1982) was a Spanish composer, conductor, and theatrical impresario. He is especially remembered for his contributions to the classical guitar repertoire, becoming one of the leading twentieth-century composers for the instrument. He was also one of the foremost composers of zarzuelas, a form of Spanish light opera. His 1932 zarzuela Luisa Fernanda has proved to be enduringly popular. In addition, he composed ballets, symphonic works, and piano pieces, as well as one-act operas and one full-length opera, El poeta, which premiered in 1980, starring tenor Plácido Domingo. Moreno Torroba also ran his own zarzuela company, which toured extensively, especially in Latin America.

== Biography and career ==
Over the course of his long career, Moreno Torroba composed many works, both in traditional Spanish forms and for the concert hall. He is often associated with the zarzuela, a traditional Spanish musical form. He achieved his greatest success in the 1930s with the zarzuelas Luisa Fernanda (1932) and La Chulapona (1934). Directing several opera companies, Moreno Torroba helped introduce the zarzuela to international audiences. In 1946 he formed a zarzuela company with singers Plácido Domingo Ferrer and Pepita Embil, the parents of Plácido Domingo and close friends of his. The company toured Latin America for two years, becoming particularly popular in Mexico. The composer who was identified from the beginning with the phalanx, to be on the national side. decided to go to America in 1946 to avoid the economic and food shortages of the postwar Spain.

Moreno Torroba also composed operas, of which La Virgen de Mayo (1925) and El poeta (1980) with Plácido Domingo in the title role, are his best known. In addition to his vocal works, he is well known for his compositions for the classical guitar, many of which were dedicated to either Maria Angélica Funes or Andrés Segovia. Although he did not play the guitar himself he had a deep understanding of the instrument, according to the virtuoso Pepe Romero. He also frequently conducted.

Torroba is also the composer of Cuban Boy, the Frank Chacksfield recorded version of which is known as the theme tune for the BBC Scotland comedy show Still Game.

== Works ==
=== Operas ===
- La Virgen de Mayo, 1 act (1925)
- El poeta, 4 acts (1980)

=== Zarzuelas ===
- La Mesonera de Tordesillas (1925)
- La Marchenera (1928)
- Azabache (1932)
- Luisa Fernanda (1932)
- Xuanón (1933)
- La Chulapona (1934)
- Sor Navarra (1938)
- Maravilla (1941)
- El Duende azul (1946, with Rodrigo)
- Baile en Capitanía (1960)
- Ella (1966)

=== Ballets ===
- Fantasía de Levante (1957)
- Don Quixote (1970)
- El Hijo pródigo (1976)
- Cristo, luz del mundo (1978)

=== Orchestral works ===
(see below for works with guitar)

- La Ajorca de oro (1918)
- Zoraida (1919)
- Suite madrileña (1953)
- Mosaico sevillano (1954)
- Aires vascos (1956)
- Danzas asturianas (1956)
- San Fermín (1960)
- Eritaña (1979)
- Sonatina trianera (1980)
- Fantasía castellana (1980) for piano and orchestra

=== Guitar works ===
Solo

- Sonatina (1924)
- Nocturno (1926)
- Suite castellana (1926). Contains: 1. Fandanguillo; 2. Arada; 3. Danza.
- Preludio (1928)
- Burgalesa (1928)
- Piezas características (1931). Contains: 1. Preámbulo; 2. Oliveras; 3. Melodía; 4. Albada; 5. Los Mayos; 6. Panorama.
- Sonata-Fantasía (early 1950s)
- Madrileñas (1953)
- Zapateados (1953)
- Segoviana (1956)
- Sevillana (1956)
- Once obras (1966)
- Habanera de mi niña (1966)
- Castillos de España ("Castles of Spain") (vol. 1, 1970; vol. 2, 1978). Contains: Sigüenza, Manzanares el Real, Alba de Tormes, Montemayor (Romance de los Pinos), Alcañiz, Javier, Torija, Simancas, Zafra, Turégano, Redaba, Alcázar de Segovia, Olite, Calatrava.
- Tríptico (1973)
- Las Puertas de Madrid (1976). Contains: Puerta de San Vicente; Puerta de Moros; Puerta de Toledo; Puerta de Alcalá; Puerta del Ángel; Puerta Cerrada; Puerta de Hierro.
- Aires de La Mancha
- Madroños
- Serenata Burlesca
- Siete Piezas de Álbum. Contains: Chisperada; Rumor de Copla; Minueto del Majo; ¡Ay, Malagueña!; Aire Vasco; Segoviana; Bolero Menorquín.
- Sonatina y variación in E minor
- Suite miniatura. Contains: Llamada; Tremolo; Vals; Divertimento.

Guitar with orchestra

- Concierto de Castilla (1960)
- Homenaje a la seguidilla (1962)
- Tres nocturnos (1970)
- Concierto ibérico (1976)
- Diálogos (1977)

Guitar quartets

- Ráfagas (1976)
- Estampas (1979)
- Sonata-Fantasía II (1976)
- Sonata trianera (1980)

=== Piano works ===
- A petits pas (1913)
- El Mate (1915)
- Alegrías de Cádiz (1957)
- Fandango corralero (1957)
- Torerías (1957)
- Chucares (1958)
- Noche sevillana (1959)

== Recordings with Moreno Torroba as conductor or performer ==
=== LP ===
- Mosaico Andaluz – Orquesta De Conciertos De Madrid, Director y arreglador F. Moreno Torroba (Sello Hispavox, Año 1958. 45 R.P.M.)
- Recordando El Ayer – Orquesta Federico Moreno Torroba (1961)
- La Voz de su Amo – Isabel Rivas, Luis Sagi-Vela, Tino Pardo, Ramón Alonso, Rosa Sarmiento, Mari Carmen Ramírez, Matilde Garcés, Enrique del Portal, Luis Frutos, Ana M.ª Amengual. Coro Cantores de Madrid, dir.: José Perera. Orquesta Lírica Española, dir.: Federico Moreno Torroba. (1968)
- Federico Moreno Torroba – Banda De Pasodobles De Madrid – Lp Pasodobles Toretos – RCA 1958
- Ultimos Exitos De Lola Flores. Acompañada Por F. Moreno Torroba Y Su Orquestra
- Luisa Fernanda – Moreno Torroba
- Corrida De Toros Con Oles
- María Manuela
- Moreno Torroba: Homenaje A La Seguidilla c/w Castelnuovo-Tedesco: Guitar Concerto In D, Op. 99. Ángel Romero, ECO, Federico Moreno Torroba. EMI: ASD 4171.

=== CD ===
- Luisa Fernanda. Moreno Torroba conducts, 1932. (Blue Moon, BMCD 7504)
- Azabache – Xuanon – Maria La Tempranica. Moreno Torroba conducts. (Blue Moon, BMCD 7544)
- La Caramba – Maravilla – La Ilustre Moza. Moreno Torroba conducts. (Blue Moon, BMCD 7526)

== Literature ==
- Clark, Walter Aaron – Krause, William Craig: Federico Moreno Torroba: A Musical Life in Three Acts. Oxford: Oxford University Press, 2013. ISBN 978-0-19-531370-3.
