= Plácido Domingo =

Spanish tenor and conductor (born 1941)

Plácido Domingo GYC OMC
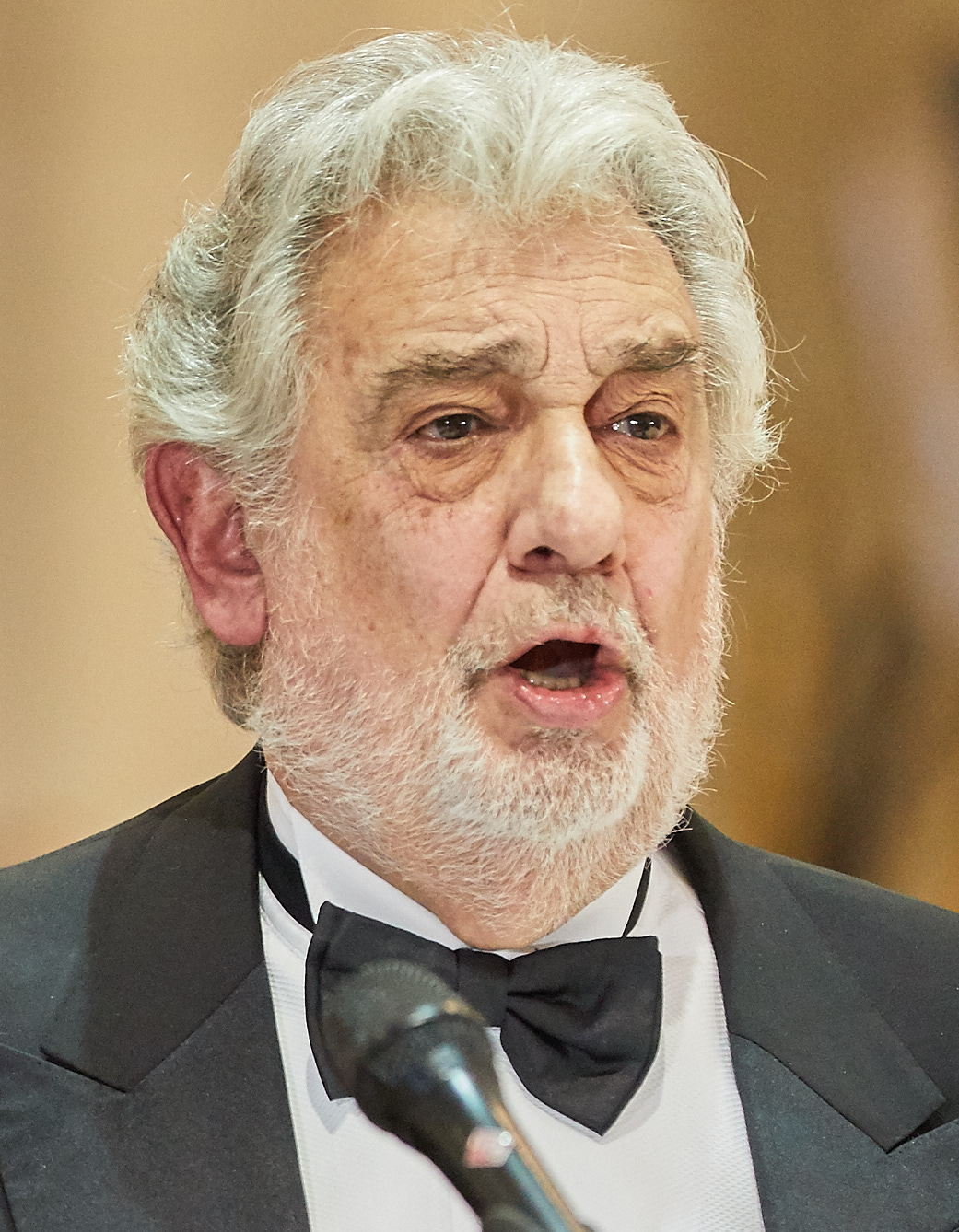
- Domingo in June 2019
- Born: José Plácido Domingo Embil; 21 January 1941 (age 85); Retiro, Madrid, Spain
- Education: National Conservatory of Music, Mexico City
- Occupations: Opera singer (tenor); conductor; arts administrator
- Years active: 1957–present
- Spouses: Ana María Guerra Cué (m. 1957; div. 1958) Marta Ornelas (m. 1962)
- Children: 3, including Plácido Jr.
- Parents: Plácido Domingo Ferrer (father); Pepita Embil (mother)

José Plácido Domingo Embil (Note: In this Spanish name, the first or paternal surname is Domingo and the second or maternal family name is Embil.) (Note: English pronunciation: /doʊˈmɪŋɡoʊ, dəˈ-/ doh-MING-goh, də-, Spanish pronunciation: [xoˈse ˈplaθiðo ðoˈmiŋɡo emˈbil].) (born 21 January 1941) is a Spanish opera singer, conductor, and arts administrator. He has recorded over a hundred complete operas and is well known for his versatility, regularly performing in Italian, French, German, Spanish, English, and Russian in the most prestigious opera houses in the world. Although primarily a lirico-spinto tenor for most of his career, especially popular for his Cavaradossi, Hoffmann, Don José and Canio, he quickly moved into more dramatic roles, becoming the most acclaimed Otello of his generation. In the early 2010s, he transitioned from the tenor repertory into exclusively baritone parts, including Simon Boccanegra. As of 2020, he has performed 151 different roles.

Domingo has also achieved significant success as a crossover artist, especially in the genres of Latin and popular music. In addition to winning fourteen Grammy and Latin Grammy Awards, several of his records have gone silver, gold, platinum and multi-platinum. His first pop album, Perhaps Love (1981), spread his fame beyond the opera world. The title song, performed as a duet with country and folk singer John Denver, has sold almost four million copies and helped lead to numerous television appearances for the tenor. He also starred in many cinematically released and televised opera movies, particularly under the direction of Franco Zeffirelli. In 1990, he began singing with fellow tenors Luciano Pavarotti and José Carreras as part of The Three Tenors. The first Three Tenors recording became the best-selling classical album of all time.

Growing up working in his parents' zarzuela company in Mexico, Domingo has since regularly promoted this form of Spanish opera. He also increasingly conducts operas and concerts and was the general director of the Los Angeles Opera in California from 2003 to 2019. He was initially the artistic director and later general director of the Washington National Opera from 1996 to 2011. He has been involved in numerous humanitarian works, as well as efforts to help young opera singers, including starting and running the international singing competition, Operalia. Since 2019 he has performed continuously on stages in Berlin, Budapest, Cologne, Graz, Madrid, Mérida, Milan, Monte Carlo, Moscow, Munich, Palermo, Rome, Salzburg, Sofia, Verona, Versailles, Vienna and Zurich.

== Early life ==
Seventeen-year-old Plácido Domingo as the tenor Rafael the bullfighter in El gato montés with Rosa Maria Montes (Mexico City, 1958)

Plácido Domingo was born on 21 January 1941 in the Retiro district of Madrid, Spain, to Pepita Embil and Plácido Domingo Ferrer. His mother recalled that she and her husband knew he would be a musician from the age of five, due to his ability to hum complex music from a zarzuela after seeing a performance of it. In 1949, just days before his eighth birthday, he moved to Mexico with his family. His parents, both singers, had decided to start a zarzuela company there after a successful tour of Latin America. Soon after arriving in Mexico, Domingo won a singing contest for boys, and his parents occasionally recruited him and his sister for children's roles in their zarzuela productions. Domingo studied piano from a young age, at first privately and later at the National Conservatory of Music in Mexico City, which he entered when he was fourteen. At the conservatory, he also attended conducting classes taught by Igor Markevitch and studied voice under Carlo Morelli, the brother of Renato Zanelli. The two brothers were famous practitioners of both baritone and tenor roles. Domingo's conservatory classes constituted the entirety of his formal vocal instruction; he never studied privately with a singing teacher.

In 1957, at age sixteen, Domingo made his first professional appearance, accompanying his mother on the piano at a concert at Mérida, Yucatán. The same year he made his major zarzuela debut in Manuel Fernández Caballero's Gigantes y cabezudos, singing a baritone role. At that time, he was working with his parents' zarzuela company, eventually taking several baritone roles and acting as an accompanist for other singers. The following year, the tenor in another company's touring production of Luisa Fernanda fell ill. In his first performance as a tenor, Domingo replaced the ailing singer, although he feared the part's tessitura was too high for him. Later that same year, he sang the tenor role of Rafael in the Spanish opera El gato montés, illustrating his willingness to assay the tenor range, even as he still considered himself a baritone. On 12 May 1959 at the Teatro Degollado in Guadalajara, he appeared in the baritone role (sometimes sung by basses) of Pascual in Emilio Arrieta's Marina. Like El gato montés, Marina is an opera composed in the zarzuela musical style rather than a zarzuela proper, although both are usually performed by zarzuela companies. In addition to his work with zarzuelas, among his earliest performances was a minor role in the first Latin American production of the musical My Fair Lady, in which he was also the assistant conductor and assistant coach. While he was a member, the company gave 185 performances of the musical in various cities in Mexico.

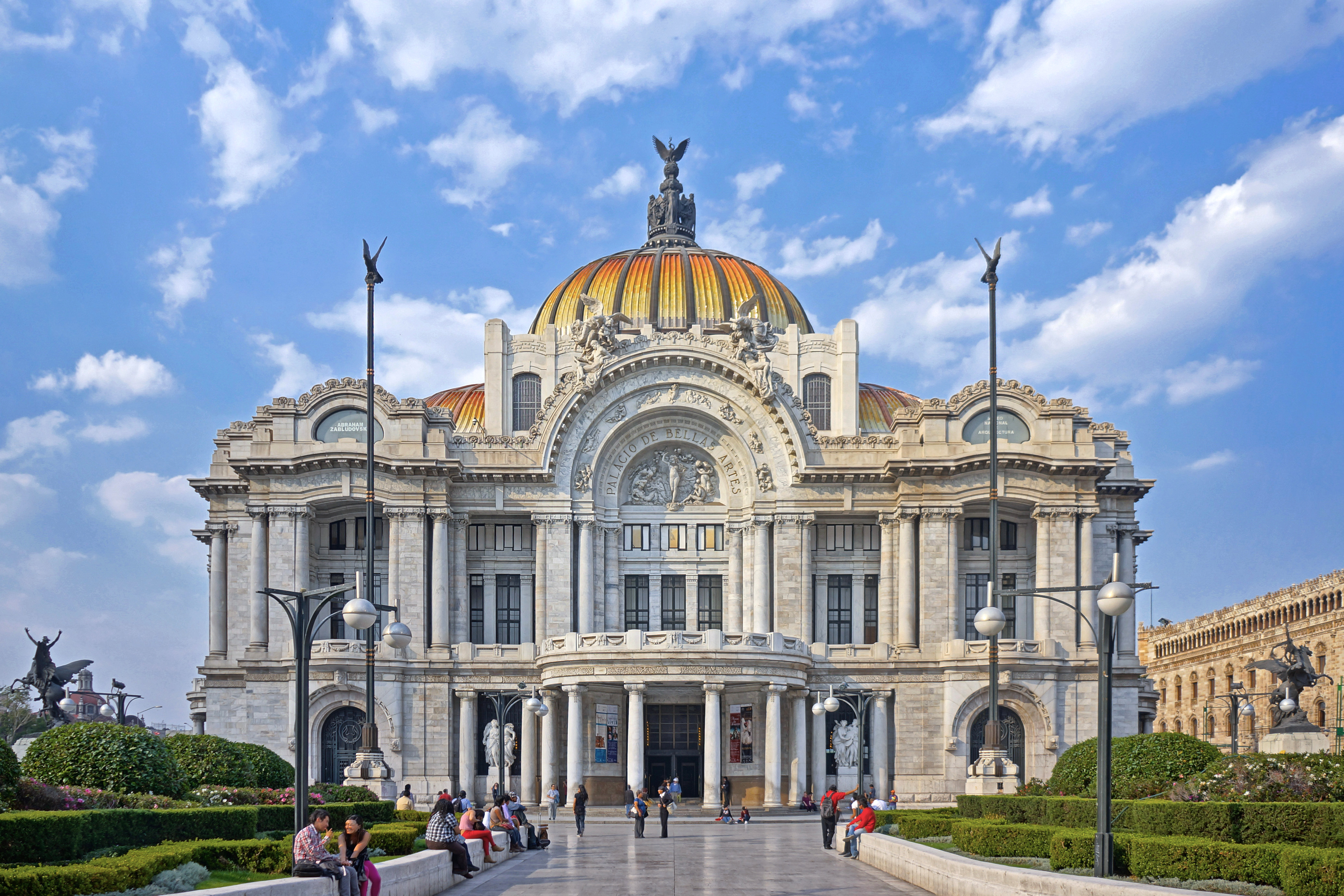
Palacio de Bellas Artes in Mexico City, where Domingo began his operatic career

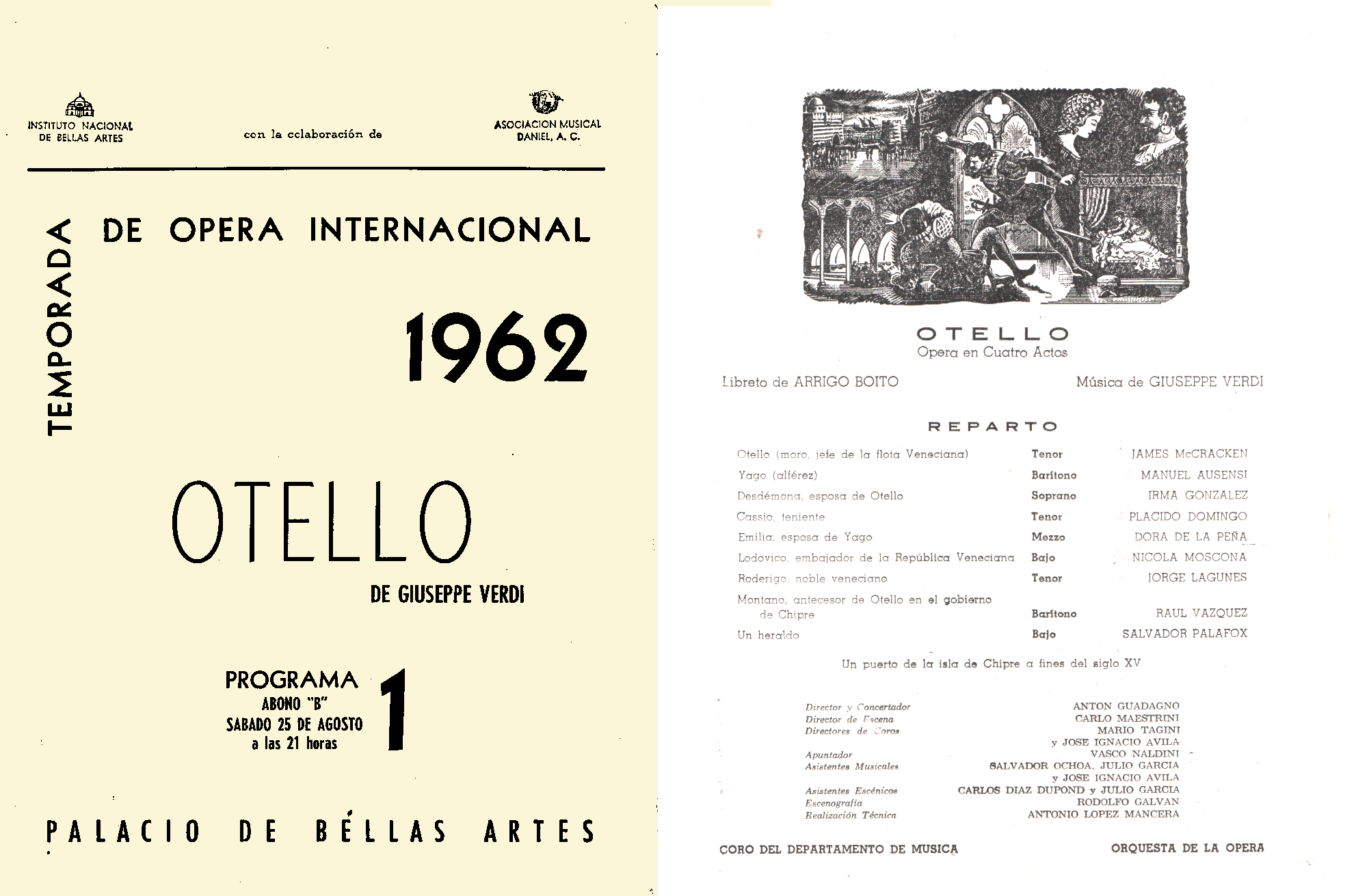
Domingo made his debut in Verdi's Otello at Bellas Artes in the comprimario rôle of Cassio in 1962

In 1959, Domingo auditioned for the Mexico National Opera at the Palacio de Bellas Artes as a baritone, but was then asked to sight-read the tenor aria "Amor ti vieta" from Fedora. He was accepted at the National Opera as a tenor comprimario and as a tutor for other singers. In what he considered his operatic debut, Domingo sang the minor role of Borsa in Verdi's Rigoletto on 23 September at the Palacio de Bellas Artes in a production with veteran American baritone Cornell MacNeil and bass-baritone Norman Treigle. He later appeared as the Padre Confessor in Dialogues of the Carmelites, Altoum and Pang in Turandot, Normanno and Arturo in Lucia di Lammermoor among other small parts. While at the National Opera, he also appeared in a production of Lehár's operetta, The Merry Widow, in which he alternated as Camille and Danilo (both originally created as tenor roles, although the latter is often sung by baritones). Domingo made his debut in Verdi's Otello at Bellas Artes at age 21 in the summer of 1962 not in the title rôle for which he has now been internationally famous for decades as one of its greatest interpreters, but in the small comprimario part of Cassio.

To supplement his income, the young Domingo played the piano for a ballet company, as well as for a program on Mexico's newly founded cultural television station. The program consisted of excerpts from zarzuelas, operettas, operas, and musical comedies. He acted in a few small parts while at the theater in plays by Federico García Lorca, Luigi Pirandello, and Anton Chekhov. He also provided song arrangements and backup vocals for Los Camisas Negras in the late 1950s, a rock-and-roll band led by César Costa. In his autobiography, Domingo reflected on the benefits of his busy and varied career as a teenager: "Today, when people ask me how I manage to hold up under my extremely heavy work load, I answer that I became accustomed to intense activity very early in my life and that I love it now as I loved it then."

== Career ==
=== 1960s–1980s ===
==== Establishing a career in opera ====
In 1961, Domingo made his operatic debut in a leading role as Alfredo in La traviata at the Teatro de la Ciudad in Monterrey. Later the same year, he made his debut in the United States with the Dallas Civic Opera, where he sang the role of Arturo in Lucia di Lammermoor opposite Joan Sutherland in the title role and Ettore Bastianini as Enrico. In 1962, he returned to Texas to sing the role of Edgardo in the same opera with Lily Pons at the Fort Worth Opera. It would be the soprano's final operatic performance. That November Domingo sang the second tenor role of Cassio to Mario del Monaco's celebrated Otello in Hartford, Connecticut. At the end of 1962, he signed a six-month contract with the Israel National Opera in Tel Aviv, but later extended the contract and stayed for two and a half years, singing 280 performances of 12 different roles.

In June 1965, after finishing his contract in Tel Aviv, Domingo auditioned at the New York City Opera. He was hired to make his New York debut as Don José in Bizet's Carmen with the company, but his debut came earlier than expected on 17 June 1965 when he filled in for an ailing tenor at the last minute in Puccini's Madama Butterfly. In February 1966, he sang the title role in the U.S. premiere of Ginastera's Don Rodrigo at the New York City Opera, to much acclaim. The New York Times review noted: "Mr. Domingo was as impressive as ever—a big, burly, large-voiced singer who looks exactly as one would visualize a hero from Gothic Spain." The performance also marked the opening of the City Opera's new home at Lincoln Center.

His official debut at the Metropolitan Opera in New York occurred on 28 September 1968, when he substituted with little notice for Franco Corelli in Cilea's Adriana Lecouvreur with Renata Tebaldi. Two years before this Adriana Lecouvreur, he had already performed with the Metropolitan Opera at Lewisohn Stadium in Mascagni's Cavalleria rusticana and Leoncavallo's Pagliacci. Since then, he has opened the season at the Metropolitan Opera 21 times, more than any other singer, surpassing the previous record of Enrico Caruso by four. He has appeared with the company every season since 1968–1969. He made his debut at the Vienna State Opera in 1967; at the Lyric Opera of Chicago in 1968; at both La Scala and San Francisco Opera in 1969; at Arena di Verona on 16 July 1969 as Calaf (his first) in Turandot with Birgit Nilsson; at the Philadelphia Lyric Opera Company in 1970; and at Covent Garden in 1971. In 1975, Domingo debuted at the prestigious Salzburg Festival, singing the title role in Don Carlo in an all-star cast with Nicolai Ghiaurov, Piero Cappuccilli, Mirella Freni and Christa Ludwig with Herbert von Karajan conducting. Thereafter Domingo frequently returned to Salzburg for a number of operas, as well as for several concert performances. He has now sung at practically every important opera house and festival worldwide.

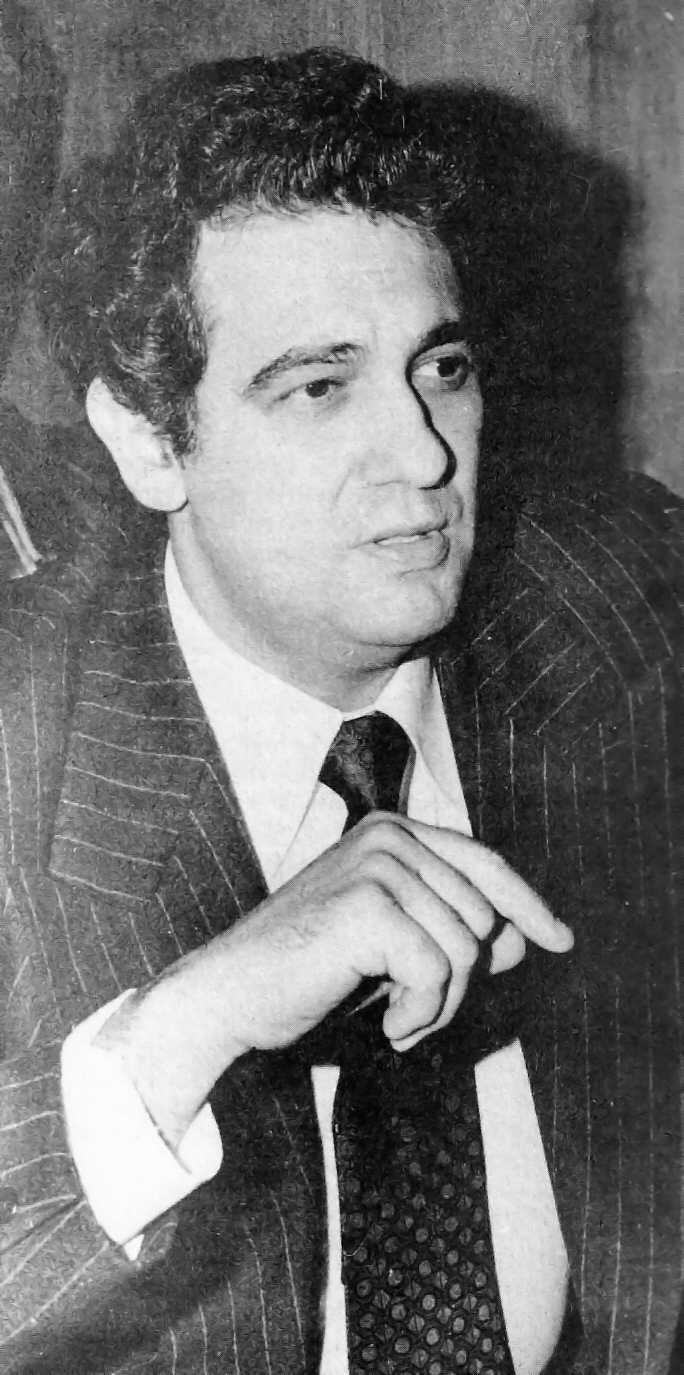
Domingo in Argentina (1979)

Domingo first sang Mario Cavaradossi in Puccini's Tosca in a 1961 performance in Mexico City. He sang Cavaradossi at the Met on 15 February 1969 with Nilsson (broadcast). 1971 he made his Covent Garden debut in the role. He continued to sing the part for many years, especially at the Met and in Vienna, eventually performing it more than any other of his roles. In September 1975, Domingo debuted in the title role of Verdi's Otello at the Hamburg State Opera. It soon became his signature role and one of operas he performed most frequently (over 200 times). He recorded the part three times in the studio and appeared in four officially released filmed versions of the opera. Oscar-winning Shakespearean actor, Laurence Olivier, declared after seeing the tenor in the role: "Domingo plays Othello as well as I do and he has that voice."

Domingo has also conducted operas and occasionally symphony orchestras as well. On 7 October 1973 he conducted his first opera performance, La traviata starring Patricia Brooks at the New York City Opera. The same year he released his debut album as a conductor, Domingo Conducts Milnes/Milnes Conducts Domingo, with baritone Sherrill Milnes. Domingo increasingly began to appear as a conductor at major opera houses around the world. In late 1983, he led a performance of Johan Strauss's Die Fledermaus at Covent Garden, which was televised. Three years later, he made a studio recording of the operetta, in which he both conducted and sang the role of Alfred.

==== Growing celebrity ====
The 1980s were a time of growing success and fame for Domingo. In 1981 he gained considerable recognition outside of the opera world when he recorded the song "Perhaps Love" as a duet with the American country/folk music singer John Denver. He followed this success with many more albums of popular and Latin music. Domingo expressed the hope that his popular albums would expand his fan base in a way that would eventually lead more people to discover opera. These forays outside of the opera world led to numerous television appearances for the tenor, who was no longer known only by classical music lovers. In 1987, he and Denver joined Julie Andrews for an Emmy Award-winning holiday television special, The Sound of Christmas, filmed in Salzburg, Austria. He was interviewed on many talk shows and news programs, including The Tonight Show with Johnny Carson and 60 Minutes. Increasingly substantial numbers of his operatic performances were also shown on television during the 1980s.

After gaining experience acting for the cameras in numerous televised operas, Domingo performed in his first cinematically released opera movie, La Traviata, in 1982. He had worked with the film's director, former Academy Award nominee Franco Zeffirelli, previously in staged opera productions. Even as filming continued in Rome, he commuted back and forth to perform live in Vienna, Buenos Aires, Barcelona, and Madrid. In 1984, Domingo filmed the role of Don José in Francesco Rosi's movie version of Carmen in his native Spain. Zeffirelli reunited with the tenor two years later for another version of an opera, Otello, that ran in movie theaters worldwide. Domingo considered Carmen the best of the three, although he disagreed with the director's "low conception" of his character. He found La traviata to be "impressive", but expressed displeasure over cuts to the music in Zeffirelli's Otello.

Even while diversifying his career, he continued to appear with great frequency in largely well-received operatic performances. By 1982 Newsweek declared Domingo "King Of The Opera" on its cover. The magazine's featured article, which recounted and analyzed his career, praised the singer for his "heroic voice, superb musicianship, fine acting skills and dashing Latin good looks". That same year, Domingo appeared at the Metropolitan Opera's opening night performance of Bellini's Norma. It was the first time onstage that the tenor sang the part of Pollione, one of his rare excursions into the bel canto repertory. He was also set to open the Met's 1983-1984 centennial season debuting as Enée in a well publicized new production of Berlioz' Les Troyens, but a couple months in advance expressed uncertainty whether he could successful sing the role's high tessitura without harming his voice. He asked to be released from his contract, but eventually decided to sing four of the six performances in the run with his friend James Levine conducting, including one performance that was telecast. He never sang the part again.

During rehearsals for Les Troyens, Domingo rescued the opening night of the San Francisco Opera's season. The tenor scheduled to sing Otello, Carlo Cossutta, cancelled on the day of the performance. The company asked Domingo to replace him at 4 p.m. He quickly flew from New York to San Francisco, rushed to the opera house, and appeared in the role at 10:30 in the evening. A writer for the San Francisco Chronicle, among other journalists, reported extensively on the event. He observed the crowds gathering around the stage door for the tenor's arrival and remarked on how most of the waiting audience members "were breathless over the chance to see Placido Domingo, a star who draws the kind of rapt devotion that Mick Jagger inspires among rock fans."

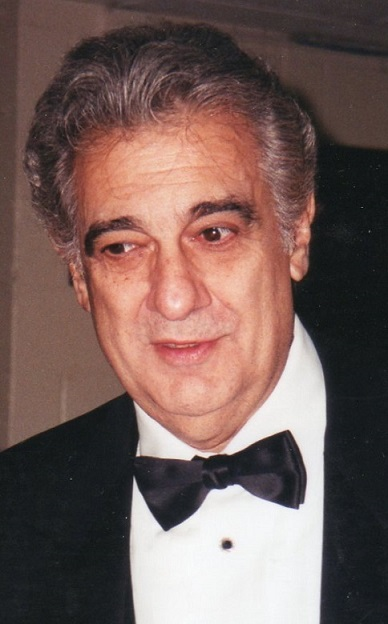
Backstage at the Washington National Opera after the opening night of Idomeneo on 3 November 2002

For the opening night of the following Met season, Domingo returned to the role of Wagner's Lohengrin, which he had last sung in early 1968. He had originally dropped the role from his repertoire after he felt his voice had been temporarily damaged by learning the challenging opera. The New York Times noted that the now more mature artist "lacked the chrome-plated, penetrating quality that one associates with German tenors", but praised him for bringing "an unusual legato grace to a role that is seldom sung so beautifully". He also performed the role at the Vienna State Opera in 1985 and 1990. A performance during his last run of the opera was televised on 28 January 1990 and later released on VHS and DVD. He had just recovered from the flu at the time.

On 19 September 1985 the biggest earthquake in Mexico's history devastated part of the Mexican capital. Domingo's aunt, uncle, cousin and his cousin's young son were killed in the collapse of the Nuevo León apartment block in the Tlatelolco housing complex. Cancelling several performances, Domingo himself labored to rescue survivors. During the next year, he performed benefit concerts for the victims and released an album of one of the events. Also in 1986 he appeared in a special gala concert for Queen Elizabeth II and in the world premiere of Goya, an opera that Gian Carlo Menotti composed specifically for him. Domingo had encouraged Menotti to make the opera about the Spanish painter Francisco Goya, whose life fascinated the singer.

=== Since 1990 ===
==== Changing repertoire ====
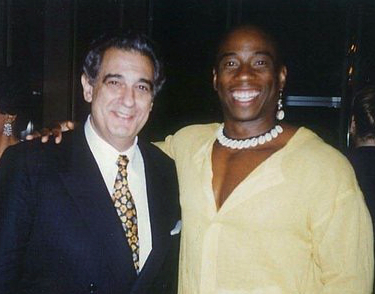
Domingo with American opera singer Stacey Robinson in 1994

Since the 1990s Domingo has continued adding new roles to his growing repertoire, while dropping earlier parts. The 1990s were the start of rapid change in the types of roles the tenor performed. During this decade he sang his last Cavaradossi, Don Carlo, Don José, Gustavo/Riccardo, Hoffmann, and Alvaro, among others, and he began instead to expand the breadth of his roles more substantially beyond the standard Italian and French repertory (Berlioz's Requiem in 1979). In particular, he increased his involvement in Wagnerian operas. Although he had already sung Lohengrin and recorded a few operas by the composer, he did not perform any of Wagner's works frequently onstage until he debuted as Parsifal in 1991 and Siegmund in 1992. He continued to sing these roles for almost two decades, including at the Bayreuth Festival.

Domingo sings "Empio, per farti guerra" from George Frideric Handel's Tamerlano at the Liceu in the 2010–2011 season

For the first time in over three decades, Domingo debuted in a Mozart opera, Idomeneo, in 1994 at the Met. During the nineties, he also appeared in the early Verdi opera, Stiffelio, the Brazilian Il Guarany, and the French grand operas, Hérodiade and Le prophète, all of which are rarely performed. Toward the end of the decade, he added his first Russian-language opera, Tchaikovsky's The Queen of Spades (although he had performed Eugene Onegin in translation while in Israel early in his career).

In the 2000s, he sang his last performances of some of the most successful operas from early in his career: Andrea Chénier, Samson et Dalila, Otello, La fanciulla del West, Fedora, Pagliacci, and Adriana Lecouvreur. In the twenty-first century, however, he has focused mostly on new roles. Early in the 2000s he sang the role of Arrigo in two concert performances of Verdi's rare La battaglia di Legnano and debuted in Ermanno Wolf-Ferrari's Sly, an opera that his Three Tenors colleague José Carreras had recently revived from obscurity. Domingo himself worked to popularize Franco Alfano's infrequently performed Cyrano de Bergerac a few years later. Shifting musical styles again, he appeared in the eighteenth-century operas Iphigénie en Tauride and Tamerlano late in the decade.

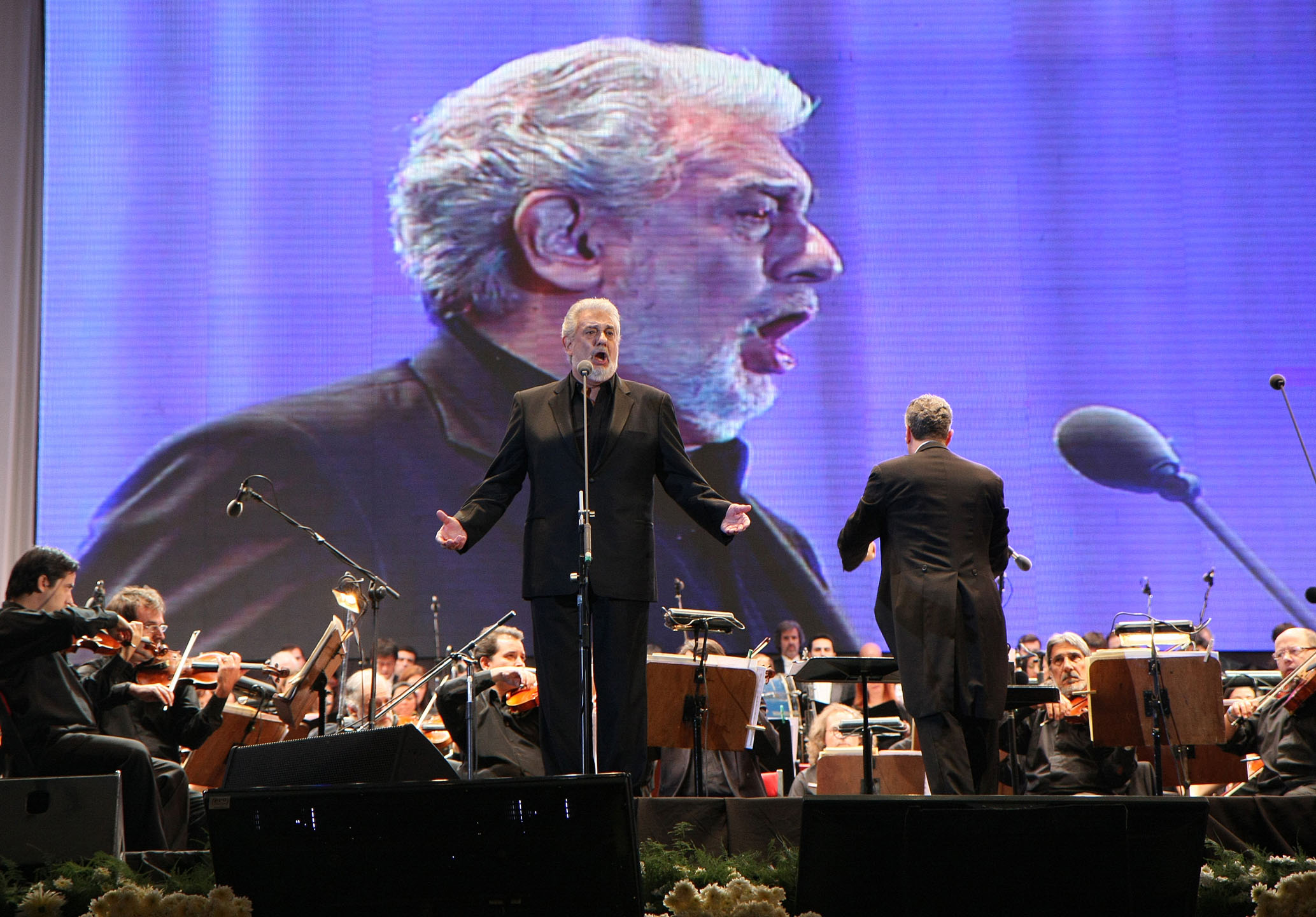
Domingo singing at a concert at the Obelisco in Buenos Aires in 2011

Additionally, Domingo created several new roles in modern operas, such as the title role in Tan Dun's 2006 opera The First Emperor at the Metropolitan Opera, which was broadcast worldwide into movie theaters as part of the Met Live in HD series. In September 2010, he created the role of the poet Pablo Neruda in the world première of Daniel Catán's opera Il Postino at the Los Angeles Opera. During the 2011–2012 season, Domingo sang Neptune in the Metropolitan Opera's world premiere performance of Jeremy Sams's The Enchanted Island. A pastiche of Baroque opera with story and characters drawn from Shakespeare's The Tempest and A Midsummer Night's Dream, a performance of the production was telecast on PBS' Great Performances at the Met.

==== High-profile appearances ====
Giving him greater international recognition outside of the world of opera, Domingo participated in The Three Tenors concert on the eve of the 1990 FIFA World Cup final in Rome with José Carreras and Luciano Pavarotti. The event was originally conceived to raise money for the José Carreras International Leukemia Foundation and was later repeated a number of times, including at the three subsequent World Cup finals (1994 in Los Angeles, 1998 in Paris, and 2002 in Yokohama). The recording of their first appearance together, Carreras Domingo Pavarotti in Concert, went multi-platinum with sales in excess of three million in the United States alone, eventually outselling every previous classical album worldwide. Domingo and his colleagues won the Grammy Award for Best Classical Vocal Solo for the album. Four years after their first successful concert, around 1.3 billion viewers worldwide watched their televised second World Cup performance at Dodger Stadium. The recording of that event, The Three Tenors in Concert 1994, went platinum and multi-platinum in many countries, even reaching the number one spot on the UK Albums Chart. Without Pavarotti and Carreras, Domingo made an appearance at the 2006 FIFA World Cup Final in Berlin, along with rising stars Anna Netrebko and Rolando Villazón. Before the 2014 FIFA World Cup final, he performed in Rio de Janeiro with pianist Lang Lang and soprano Ana María Martínez, a winner of his Operalia competition and a frequent singing partner of his. In addition to these large-scale concerts, Domingo recorded the official song for the 1982 FIFA World Cup in Spain, "El Mundial".

A lifelong football fan, Domingo has been a vocal supporter of Real Madrid C.F., his home-town team. In 2002, he performed the club's new commemorative anthem, "Himno del Centenario del Real Madrid". It was written by José María Cano, with whom he had previously collaborated on the opera, Luna. Domingo presented the song live at the Bernabeu Stadium during celebrations of the football club's 100 year anniversary. On 13 May 2012, Domingo performed during Real Madrid's season-ending celebrations, when the team won their 32nd Spanish league title. In 2016 he sang the new version of Real Madrid's "Hala Madrid y nada más" with "...Y Nada Mas."

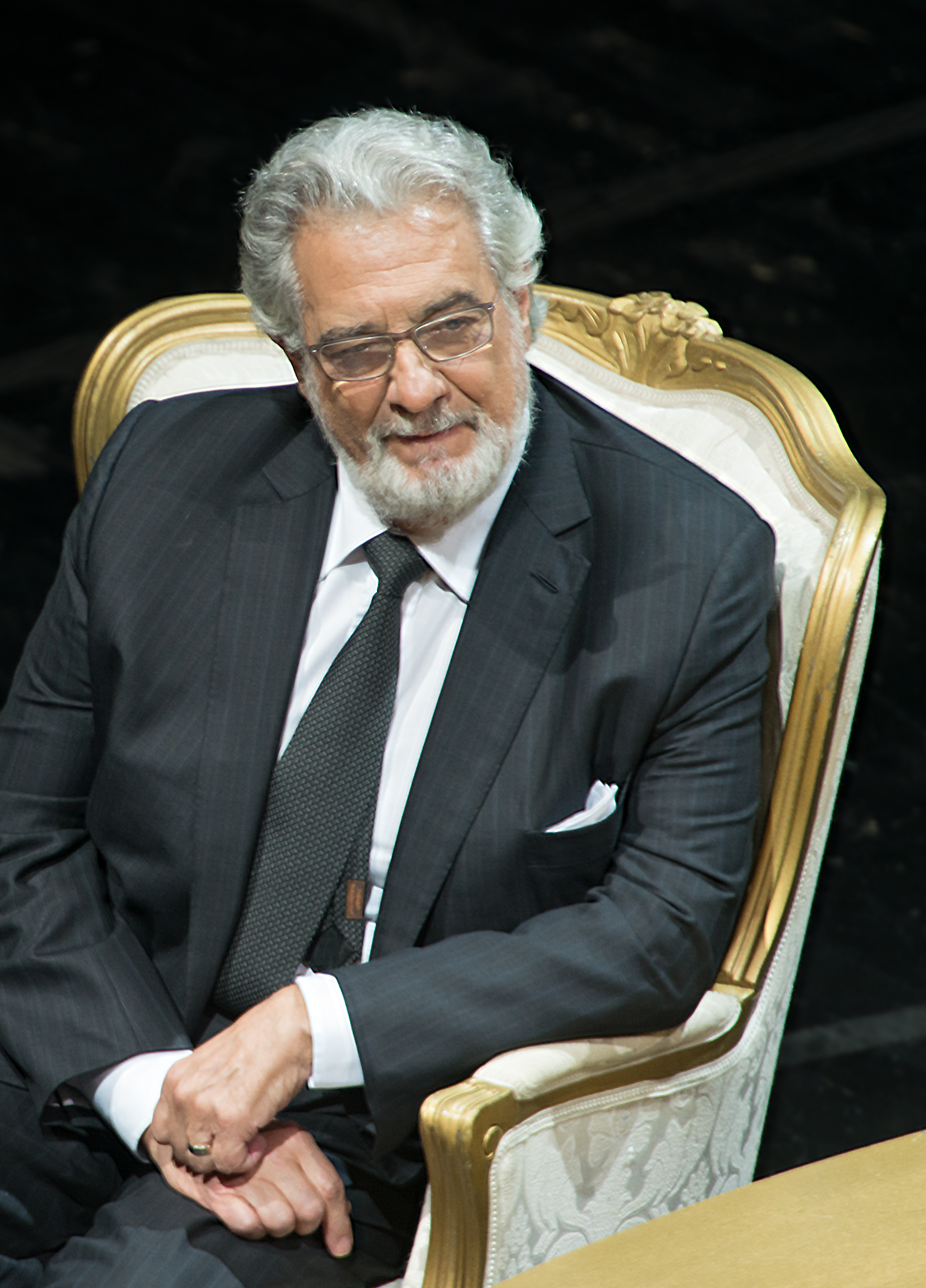
Domingo as the president of Europa Nostra at the organization's awards ceremony in 2014

On 24 August 2008, Domingo performed a duet with Song Zuying, singing Ài de Huǒyàn (The Flame of Love) at the 2008 Summer Olympics closing ceremony in Beijing. The Beijing Olympics was the second Olympics at which he performed; he also sang the Olympic Hymn at the closing ceremonies of the Barcelona Olympics in 1992.

In 2002, he made a guest appearance on the song "Novus", the closing track on Santana's album Shaman. Domingo sang before Benedict XVI, during the pope's visit to Nationals Park and the Italian embassy in Washington, D.C., on 16 and 17 April 2008. On 15 March 2009, the Metropolitan Opera paid tribute to Domingo's 40th and the company's 125th anniversaries with a gala performance and onstage dinner. On 29 August 2009, he sang "Panis angelicus" at the funeral mass of Senator Ted Kennedy in the Basilica of Our Lady of Perpetual Help in Boston, Massachusetts. In March 2011, Domingo cancelled an engagement in Buenos Aires at the Teatro Colón in support of the theatre's musicians, who were on strike.

==== As an opera company director ====
Domingo began an affiliation with the Washington National Opera in 1986, when he appeared in its world premiere production of Menotti's Goya. This was followed by performances in a production of Tosca in the 1988/89 season. Beginning in the 1996/97 season, he took on the role of Artistic Director, bringing new life to the company's productions through his many connections to singers throughout the world and his own annual appearances in one role each season. One example of his ability to bring new singers to the stage were those by the then up-and-coming Anna Netrebko as Gilda in Rigoletto during the 1999/2000 season. In 2003 Domingo became General Director and his contract was extended through the 2010–2011 season.

Parallel to Domingo's management of the Washington company, he had been Artistic Director of the Los Angeles Opera since 2000. He assumed the position of General Director of the company in 2003. On 20 September 2010, he announced that he would renew his contract as General Director through 2013. A week later he announced that he would not renew his contract as General Director of the Washington National Opera beyond its June 2011 expiration date. Reaction to this included The Washington Post's comments on his accomplishments:

Domingo's goal was to make the WNO an internationally regarded company. At the beginning of his tenure, he lifted the opera to a new level, bringing in more international stars and big-name productions – including José Carreras in Wolf-Ferrari's Sly, Mirella Freni singing opposite Domingo in Fedora, and Renée Fleming in Lucrezia Borgia. And his commitment to American opera meant that the WNO presented the second or third productions of a number of important works: Maw's Sophie's Choice, Bolcom's A View From the Bridge, Previn's A Streetcar Named Desire.

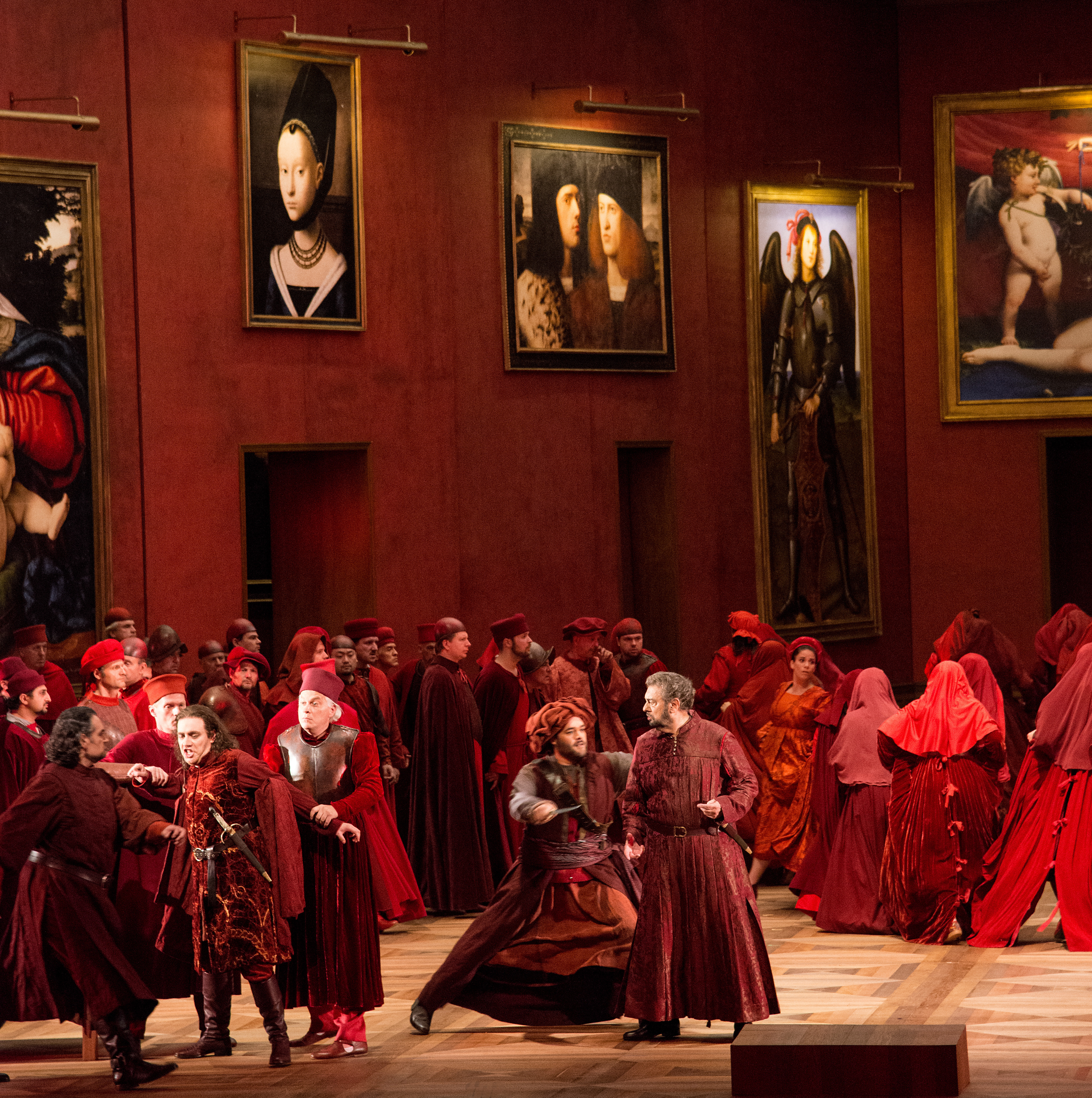
Domingo (center right) as the baritone in Il trovatore at the 2014 Salzburg Festival with Francesco Meli (far left, with sword)

Domingo attempted to quash criticism in East Coast newspapers that he was taking on too much when the singer gave an interview in the Los Angeles Times in which he restated his long-time motto, "When I rest, I rust".

In October 2019, Domingo resigned as general director of the Los Angeles Opera amid accusations of sexual harassment.

==== Taking on baritone roles ====
Domingo announced in 2007 that two years later he would take on one of Verdi's most demanding baritone roles, singing the title role in Simon Boccanegra. His debut performance in the part occurred at the Berlin State Opera on 24 October, followed by 29 other performances during the 2009–2010 season at major opera houses around the world, including the Met and the Royal Opera House in London.

After the success of Boccanegra, Domingo has performed other baritone roles including the character of Rigoletto in Verdi's Rigoletto in August 2010 at Reignwood Theatre in Beijing. In March 2012, for the first time he sang the baritone role of the Cenobite monk Athanaël in Massenet's Thaïs, his 139th role. Again, in 2011 he undertook the role of Rigoletto in a live television broadcast in Europe which was shot in real locations in Mantua.

He appeared as Doge Francesco Foscari in Verdi's I due Foscari in a production directed by Thaddeus Strassberger for the Los Angeles Opera in September 2012, in Valencia in early 2013, and at Covent Garden in late 2014. In March 2013, at the Metropolitan Opera, he appeared for the first time as Giorgio Germont in Verdi's La Traviata. The following year, he sang Giacomo in Verdi's Giovanna d'Arco in Salzburg. Later in 2014, he debuted as the Conte di Luna in Il trovatore in Berlin. The following season, he sang di Luna again at the Salzburg Festival with Anna Netrebko as Leonora, Marie-Nicole Lemieux as Azucena and Francesco Meli as Manrico. He first sang the title role of Verdi's Nabucco at Covent Garden in March–April 2013 and has since reprised it in Saint Petersburg, Beijing, Verona, and Vienna. In 2015, he made his debut in the title role of Verdi's Macbeth in Berlin, as well as Don Carlo in Ernani in New York and the title role of Gianni Schicchi in Los Angeles.

On 13 June 2018, Plácido Domingo performed at the 2018 FIFA World Cup opening gala concert in Moscow held at the Red Square in Moscow, with Anna Netrebko, Juan Diego Florez and Aida Garifullina and the Mariinsky Theatre Orchestra conducted by Valery Gergiev.

== Family and personal life ==
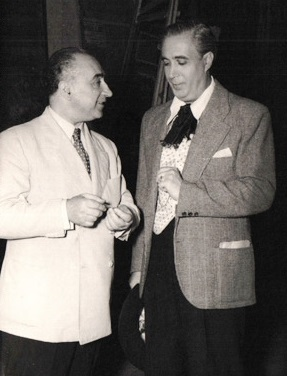
Domingo's father, Plácido Domingo Ferrer (right), with composer Federico Moreno Torroba in Madrid, 1946

Domingo was born to Plácido Francisco Domingo Ferrer (8 March 1907 – 22 November 1987) and Josefa "Pepita" Embil Echániz (28 February 1918 – 28 August 1994), two Spanish zarzuela stars who nurtured his early musical abilities. Domingo's father was half Aragonese and half Catalan, while his mother was a Basque from Gipuzkoa. His father began as a violinist performing for opera and zarzuela orchestras. He soon also took on baritone roles in zarzuelas. Even though he damaged his voice by performing while suffering from a cold, he continued singing into the 1970s. Domingo's mother was an established soprano who made her stage debut at the Gran Teatre del Liceu in Barcelona. She met her husband at age 21 while performing in Federico Moreno Torroba's Sor Navarra. Domingo later recalled that experts encouraged his father to sing Wagnerian heldentenor roles, while the Liceu offered his mother a contract to sing opera. In 1946 Moreno Torroba and Domingo's parents formed a zarzuela company and toured in Latin America. His parents later stayed permanently in Mexico and established their own zarzuela troupe, the Domingo-Embil Company. In addition to their son, they also had a daughter, Maria José "Mari Pepa" Domingo de Fernandez (1942–2015).

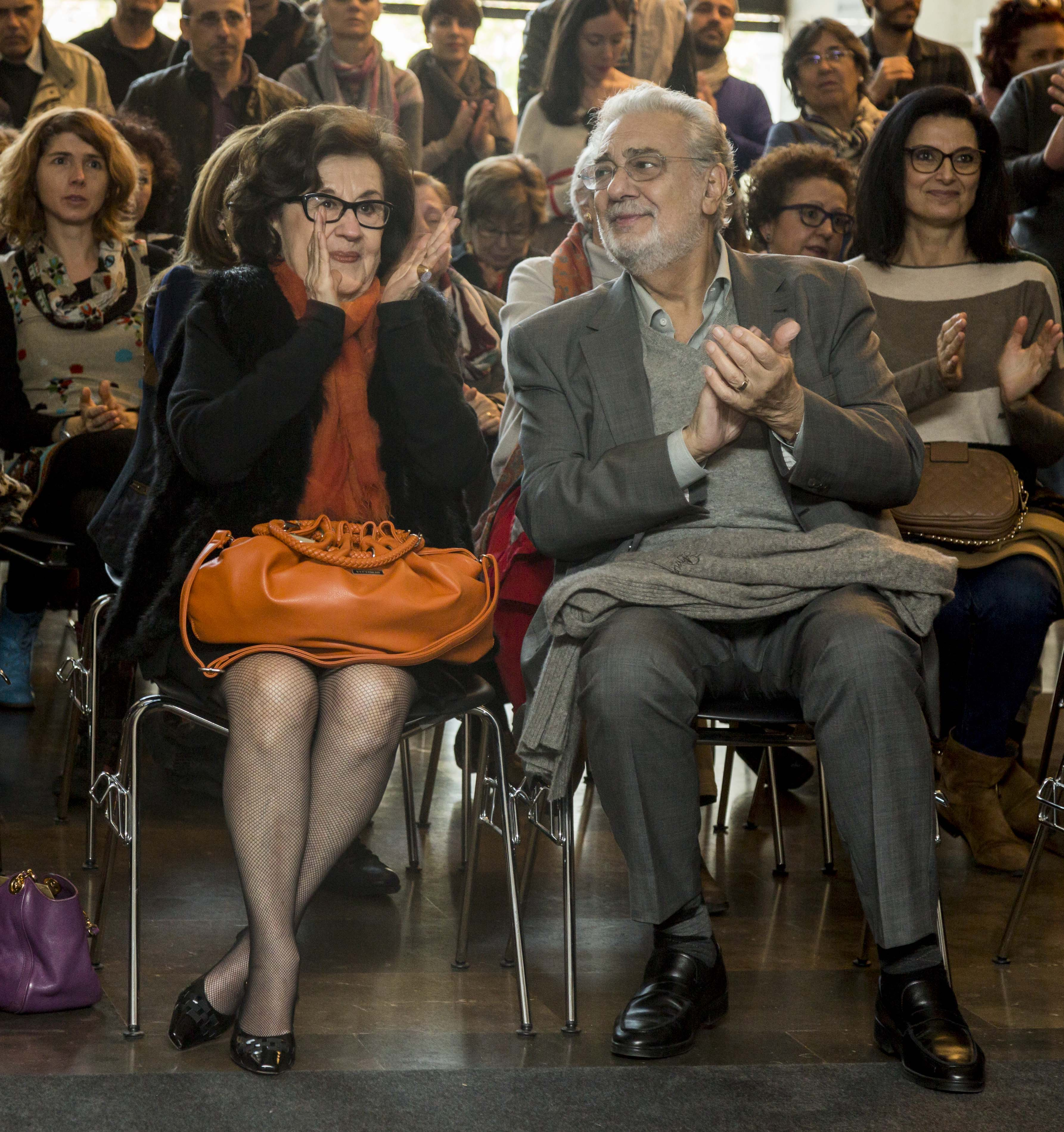
Domingo with his wife

On 29 August 1957 at age 16, Domingo married a fellow piano student, Ana María Guerra Cué (1938–2006). Their son, José Plácido Domingo Guerra (called "Pepe" as a boy and later "Joe"), now a photographer, was born on 16 June 1958. However, the marriage did not last long, with the couple separating shortly thereafter. On 1 August 1962, Domingo married Marta Ornelas (born 1935), a lyric soprano from Veracruz, Mexico, whom he met during his conservatory days. In the same year, Marta had been voted "Mexican Singer of the Year". After their wedding, the couple performed together frequently at the Israel National Opera. However, after she became pregnant with her first child, she gave up her promising career to devote time to her family. They have two sons, Plácido Francisco (known as Plácido Domingo Jr.), born 21 October 1965, and Alvaro Maurizio, born 11 October 1968.

After a period of time living in Israel, Domingo and his growing family moved to Teaneck, New Jersey, in the 1960s. He later acquired residences in Manhattan and Barcelona. Keeping his apartment in New York, he currently also has a house in his native Madrid. During breaks in his work schedule, he usually spends time with family at his vacation home in Acapulco, Mexico.

In March 2010 he underwent surgery for colon cancer. In July 2013, he was admitted to a hospital in Madrid after suffering a pulmonary embolism. He was released on 14 July, and was "expected to make a full recovery". In October 2015, he was admitted to a hospital for a cholecystectomy and missed the first five performances of Tosca he was supposed to conduct at the Metropolitan Opera.

== Sexual harassment allegations ==
In August 2019, Domingo was accused of sexual harassment by multiple female colleagues, some dating back as far as 30 years. However, no official charges were ever filed, nor were there any court proceedings or convictions. Nonetheless, Domingo subsequently resigned from his position as general manager of the Los Angeles Opera, saying he did so with a "heavy heart", but in light of the recent allegations against him, he said the move was in the best interest for the opera company.

In late February 2020, Domingo apologized to any colleagues who felt uncomfortable or in any way hurt by his comments or actions. He reiterated that it was never his intention to hurt or offend anyone, saying, "I have never behaved aggressively toward anyone, and I have never done anything to hinder or harm anyone's career in any way. On the contrary, I have spent much of my half-century in the opera world supporting the industry and furthering the careers of countless singers."

The investigation launched by the Los Angeles Opera into the incidents at the house "deemed the allegations to be credible, in part because of the similarities in their accounts". The investigation "often found him to be sincere in his denials but found some of them to be less credible or lacking in awareness". However, Gibson Dunn "found no evidence that Mr. Domingo ever engaged in a quid pro quo or retaliated against any woman by not casting or otherwise hiring her at LA Opera, especially since casting and other hiring decisions are complex, performance-specific and determined by multiple people." The investigation criticized inadequate communication and lack of awareness about sexual harassment at the opera.

In his first interview since recovering from COVID-19, Domingo told the Italian newspaper La Repubblica that the charges were false. "When I knew that I had COVID, I promised myself that if I came out alive, I would fight to clear my name", Domingo said. "I never abused anyone. I will repeat that as long as I live."

== Recordings ==
=== Complete operas and recital discs ===
Domingo has made over 200 recordings, most of which are full-length operas; he has recorded nearly all of opera's leading tenor roles, several of them more than once. As a teenager, he first appeared in very small parts on the Spanish-language original cast versions of the musicals My Fair Lady (1959) and Redhead (1960). In 1968, he released his first solo album, Recital of Italian Operatic Arias (also known as Bel Canto Domingo). The album, conducted by Nello Santi, received the Grand Prix du Disque. In 1968, Domingo made his first recordings for RCA Red Seal, which would be his primary record label throughout the 1970s. His first recital album for RCA, titled Romantic Arias was issued in 1969, followed by his first studio recording of a complete opera, Il trovatore, with Leontyne Price and Sherrill Milnes. RCA would record Domingo, Milnes and Price together several more times, both in complete operas and recital discs. Domingo followed Il trovatore with a steady stream of complete recorded operas from the 1970s through the early years of the next century. Beginning with Il tabarro in 1970, Les Troyens 1983 and ending with Edgar in 2006, Domingo has recorded all of Puccini's tenor operatic roles. Among Domingo's albums is a boxed set issued in 2001 by Deutsche Grammophon of every major tenor aria composed by Verdi, including several obscure and rarely performed versions in languages different from the original operas and written only for specific performances. He has also recorded the vocal parts in many symphonic works and has conducted on some of his albums.

In August 2005, EMI Classics released a highly anticipated and publicized studio recording of Richard Wagner's Tristan und Isolde, in which Domingo and Operalia winner Nina Stemme sang the title roles. A review, headlined "Vocal perfections", in the 8 August 2005 issue of The Economist called the recording "monumental" and praised it for having "a musical lyricism and a sexual passion that make the cost and the effort entirely worthwhile". The review also characterized Domingo's July 2005 performance of Siegmund in Wagner's Die Walküre at Covent Garden as "unforgettable" and "luminous". More recently Domingo has appeared with Angela Gheorghiu on a recording of Fedora, an opera in which he often appeared onstage, and as the baritone in a live version of Giovanna d'Arco with Anna Netrebko. In September 2011, aged 70, he signed an exclusive record contract with Sony Classics.

=== Crossover albums ===
In addition to his classical recordings, Domingo has released numerous crossover albums. His output of non-operatic recordings accelerated after his first pop album, Perhaps Love (1981), went gold and eventually platinum. His other recordings of popular music include My Life for a Song (1983), Save Your Nights for Me (1985), and the British gold record, Be My Love (1990). His English-language version of "Bésame Mucho" from My Life for a Song received a Grammy nomination for Best Latin Pop Performance in 1984. The following year he won a Grammy in the same category for his collection of Ernesto Lecuona songs, Always in My Heart (Siempre en mi corazón). (He won a second Grammy the same year for Carmen under the baton of Lorin Maazel.) In 2012, he recorded Songs with Josh Groban, Susan Boyle, and jazz singer Harry Connick, Jr., among others. In 2015, he released a holiday album, My Christmas including duets with Idina Menzel, Jackie Evancho, Plácido Domingo Jr., The Piano Guys and others.

Since the early 1980s, Domingo has released several Latin albums, including two featuring the music of Mexican songwriter, Agustín Lara. He devoted two more of his albums, Adoro (1982) and 100 años de Mariachi (1999), solely to Mexican music. 100 años de Mariachi, a rancheras collection, went platinum in the United States and gold in Mexico. He later recalled that, as a fan of mariachi music since boyhood, the Grammy he won for 100 años de Mariachi was the award that meant the most to him of all he has received.

== Appearances on film and television ==
Domingo has starred in several opera films. His three theatrical released opera movies from the 1980s received significant awards and recognitions, including Golden Globe and BAFTA nominations for Best Foreign Language Film. Zeffirelli's La Traviata and Otello both received Academy Award nominations, and the soundtracks of La Traviata and Rosi's Carmen won Grammy Awards for the Best Opera Recording of the year. Domingo has also made various opera films for television, including Jean-Pierre Ponnelle's Madama Butterfly with Mirella Freni, Gianfranco de Bosio's Tosca with Raina Kabaivanska, Giuseppe Patroni Griffi's Tosca with Catherine Malfitano (Emmy Award), Franco Zeffirelli's Cavalleria rusticana and Pagliacci, and more recently, Marco Bellocchio's Rigoletto a Mantova.

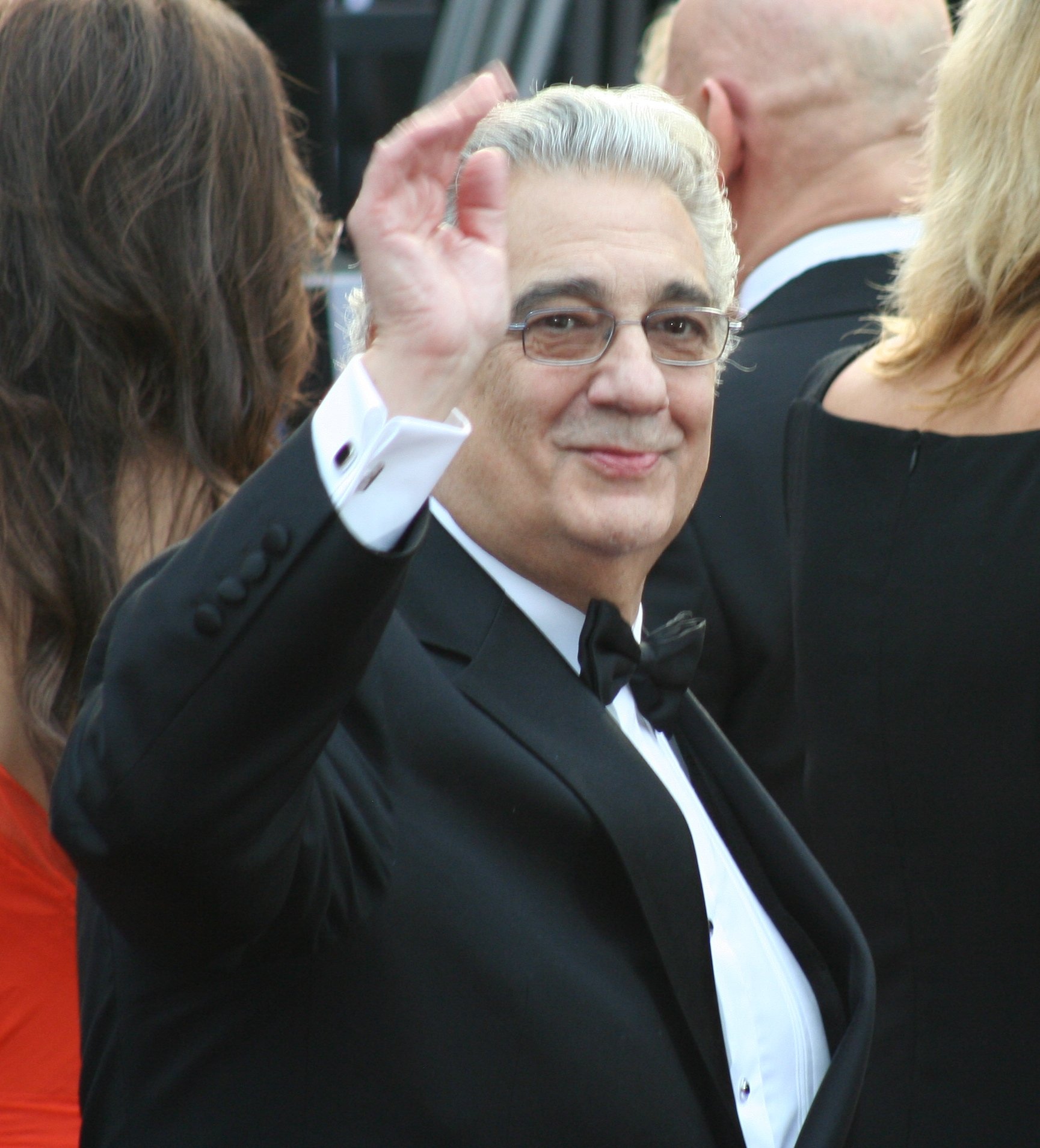
Domingo at the 81st Academy Awards in 2009

Over the course of decades, he has sung in numerous Live from the Metropolitan Opera telecasts and Met radio broadcasts. He has also appeared often in televised performances from other opera houses. In 1978, he starred in the La Scala production of Puccini's Manon Lescaut that marked the house debut of Hungarian soprano Sylvia Sass. In addition, many of his concerts and zarzuela evenings have been televised. Beyond his filmed opera and concert performances, he has frequently made guest appearances on television. Domingo appeared on The Cosby Show Season 5 as Alberto Santiago, a colleague of Dr. Cliff Huxtable. In 1989, the international television series Return Journey featured Domingo returning to his home city of Madrid reflecting on life there whilst recording an album of Zarzuela arias for EMI. On the 1993 Academy Awards telecast, he performed the song, "Beautiful Maria of My Soul," from the movie The Mambo Kings, which had received a nomination for Best Original Song. The tenor was the first Spaniard to perform at an Academy Awards ceremony. He had previously presented the Oscar for Best Foreign Language Film with Faye Dunaway at the 57th Academy Awards in 1985.

Domingo was the executive producer of the critically acclaimed 1998 Mexican film The Other Conquest, produced by his son Alvaro and directed by Salvador Carrasco, in which Domingo also sang the original aria "Mater Aeterna", composed by Samuel Zyman with lyrics by Carrasco. He was also heard performing the song "In Pace", during the closing credits of Kenneth Branagh's Hamlet (1996). In 2008, Domingo provided the voice of the long-haired Chihuahua named Montezuma in Disney's Beverly Hills Chihuahua. He also appeared as Manolo's great-grandfather in the animated film The Book of Life in 2014.

=== Christmas in Vienna ===
In December 1992, Domingo collaborated with José Carreras and Diana Ross in a televised Christmas-themed concert. Vienna was chosen to host the event due to its reputation as a capital of music and the particular charm of Austria during Christmas time. The Wiener Symphoniker, conducted by Vjekoslav Šutej, provided the orchestral music, and the Gumpoldskirchen Children's Choir provided choral vocals. On 23 December 1992, the first in what would turn out to be a series of Christmas in Vienna concerts was seen worldwide by several hundred million people. Domingo returned to Vienna for many more Christmas in Vienna concerts, performing with stars of both pop and classical music, including Dionne Warwick, Charles Aznavour, Sissel Kyrkjebø, Michael Bolton, Sarah Brightman, Charlotte Church, Natalie Cole, Riccardo Cocciante, Patricia Kaas, Luciano Pavarotti, Tony Bennett and others.

== Cultural references ==
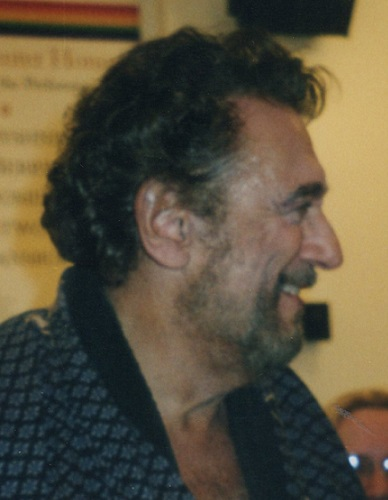
At the Washington National Opera on 14 April 2007 after a performance of Die Walküre, his most frequently performed German opera

By the 1980s and 1990s, popular cultural forms, especially television programs, began to reference Domingo, often as a prototypical opera singer or as part of the influential Three Tenors. In 1987 Sesame Street, a U.S. children's television show that has been on the air since 1969, introduced a puppet character named after Domingo. In the series, Placido Flamingo was a pink singing bird who appeared regularly on "Live from the Nest" (a play on "Live from the Met") telecasts from the Nestropolitan Opera. In the 1989 special "Sesame Street... 20 Years & Still Counting", Domingo appeared with his namesake puppet, singing "Look through the Window" together. The show never revived the character after Richard Hunt, who voiced and puppeteered Placido Flamingo, died in early 1992. Similarly, in the 2009 Australian-Canadian cartoon comedy Pearlie, the father of a family of opera singing fleas is named Placido. Although not opera related, one of the Three Emperors (a take-off on the Three Tenors) in the original Japanese version of the anime series, Yu-Gi-Oh! 5D's (2008-2011), is also named after the singer.

In 2007, Domingo had a cameo role on The Simpsons. He provided the voice for an animated version of himself in the episode "The Homer of Seville", which revolves around Homer Simpson becoming an opera singer. After an opera performance, Homer chats with Domingo, who tells him to call him "P. Dingo" (a play on "P. Diddy") and asks him for singing advice. Although not providing voice-overs, he was also an animated character in a 1995 episode ("Three Tenors and You're Out") of the Warner Brothers children's cartoon, Animaniacs, and a 1999 episode ("Censoring Problems: The Three Stooges vs. The Three Tenors") of MTV's comedy, Celebrity Deathmatch.

Domingo, along with Luciano Pavarotti and José Carreras, loosely inspired the 2001 English-language film, Off Key, by Spanish director Manuel Gómez Pereira. The movie's leading character, Ricardo Palacios (played by Joe Mantegna), is a Spanish tenor with vague ties to Mexico, who plays the piano, conducts, seeks celebrity outside of the opera world, and is proud of his Otello. Like Domingo, he discovers new operatic talents, sings duets with pop singers, and performs mariachi music and tangos. The farcical plot, however, has nothing in common with actual occurrences in the lives of Domingo or his colleagues. The movie was the most expensive production in Spain's cinematic history to that point.

American author Elizabeth George references Domingo in one of her series of mystery novels about the fictional Inspector Lynley, This Body of Death (2010). In the book, Meredith's young daughter is an enthusiastic fan of Domingo and has the detective read to her from an unauthorized biography of the singer. The real-life Domingo was also mentioned as part of a running gag on the 1996 Seinfeld episode, "The Doll". He was also referenced several times throughout the sitcom series Everybody Loves Raymond as Raymond's mother, Marie's, favorite opera singer. In addition, he has appeared on the cover of several opera-related books, as a key representative of the musical genre. In 2011, Spanish author Rubén Amón wrote a book, Plácido Domingo: Un coloso en el teatro del mundo, analyzing the singer as a cultural and sociological phenomenon.

== Repertoire ==
Domingo has sung 151 roles in Italian, French, German, English, Spanish and Russian. His main repertoire however is Italian (Otello; Cavaradossi in Tosca; Don Carlo; Des Grieux in Manon Lescaut; Dick Johnson in La fanciulla del West; Radames in Aida); French (Don José in Carmen; Samson in Samson and Delilah; Énée in Les Troyens; Hoffmann in Les Contes d'Hoffmann); and German (Lohengrin, Parsifal, and Siegmund in Die Walküre). He has appeared in more operas by Giuseppe Verdi than any other composer. Domingo has created original roles in eight world premieres of operas, Vásquez's El último sueño, Moreno Torroba's El poeta, Menotti's Goya, García Abril's Divinas palabras, Cano's Luna, Drattell's Nicholas and Alexandra, Tan Dun's The First Emperor, and Catán's Il Postino, as well as one pasticcio, The Enchanted Island. He also performed in the U.S. premieres of Don Rodrigo and Cyrano de Bergerac. He continues to add more roles to his repertoire, most recently performing as Schicchi in Puccini's one-act opera Gianni Schicchi in September 2015.

After taking on baritone roles, he sang Conte Di Luna in Il Trovatore, an opera in which he previously performed as Manrico, a tenor role. His last major role in a full-length opera was in the title role of Nabucco in the production by Thaddeus Strassberger in December 2019 in Valencia. During the curtain call many supporters of the singer showed support by dropping flyers in support of the singer.

== Awards and honors ==
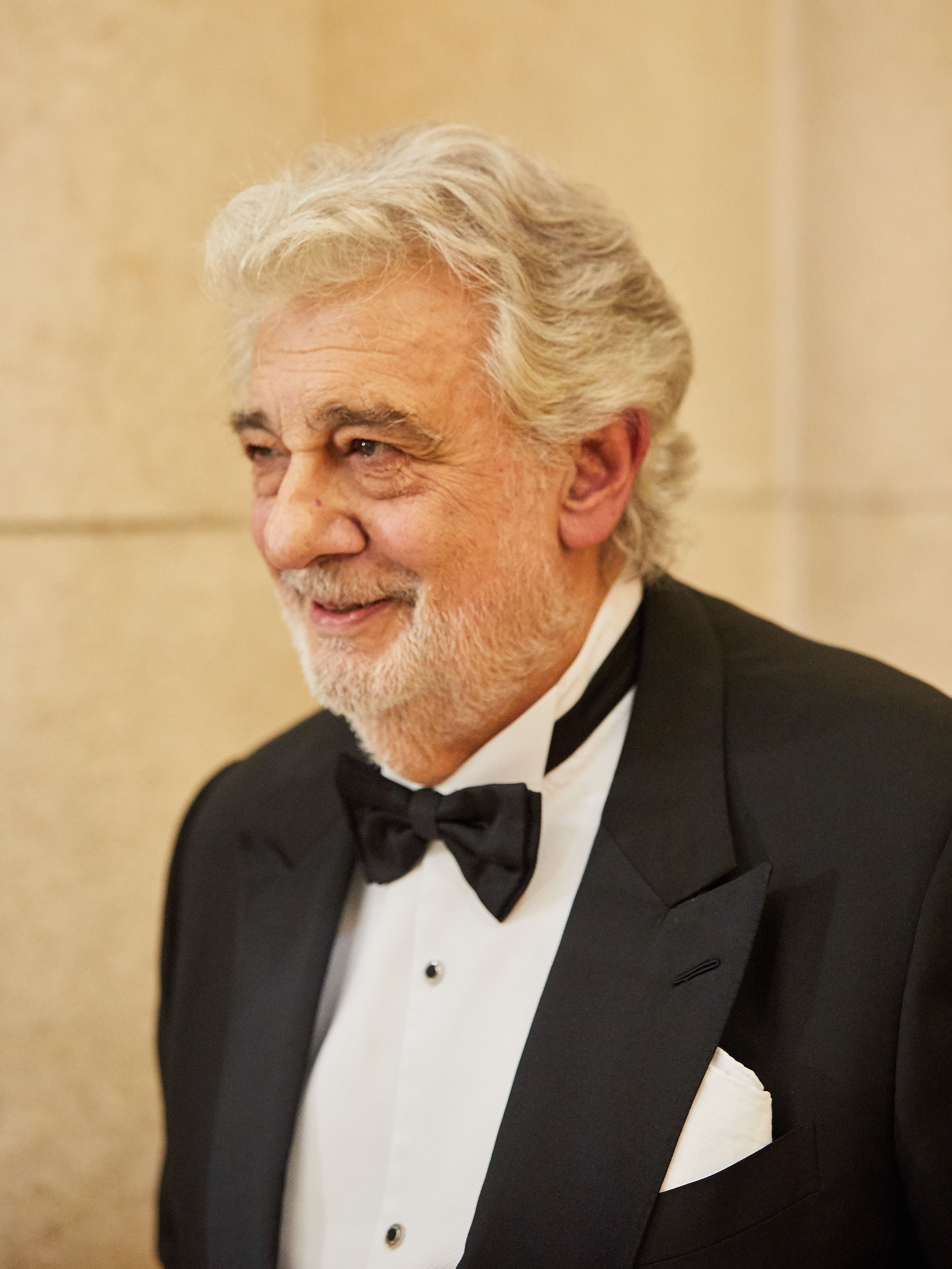
Placido Domingo at a concert.

Plácido Domingo has received many awards and honors for his achievement in the field of music and in recognition of his many benefit concerts and contributions to various charities. In 1978, when Domingo was only 37, the city of Madrid dedicated a commemorative plaque at his birthplace at 34 Calle Ibiza near the Buen Retiro Park.

The singer won his first Grammy Award in 1971 and has gone on to win eight more, as well as five Latin Grammy awards including an award for Latin Recording Academy Person of the Year.

A Kammersänger of the Vienna State Opera and the recipient of numerous honorary doctorates, he has received other major awards that include being made an honorary Knight Commander of the Order of the British Empire in 2002.

In 2006, he received the Brit Award for Outstanding Contribution to Music.

He has also received the Austrian Cross of Honour for Science and Art, 1st class (1992); Grand Decoration of Honour in Silver for Services to the Republic of Austria (2007); Commander of the French Légion d'honneur; Mexican Order of the Aztec Eagle; Spanish Prince of Asturias Award for Arts (1991); the United States Presidential Medal of Freedom; and in 2011, a Medal of Honour from Sultan Qaboos bin Said of Oman. The first Birgit Nilsson Prize was awarded to him in 2009.

In 2012, Domingo was voted into Gramophone's first Hall of Fame.

In April 2014, Domingo was awarded an Honorary Doctorate of Music degree by Berklee College of Music at its campus in Valencia, Spain. During his acceptance speech, Domingo said, "it is a great pleasure to have a connection between Boston and Valencia since both have been so important in my career." Domingo sang Handel's Messiah with the Boston Symphony Orchestra at the beginning of his career, and performed his first Bohéme at the Palau de les Arts.

In June 2018, Iberia Airlines honored Domingo by placing his name on their first Airbus A350 delivered to the Airline.

== Humanitarian works and initiatives ==
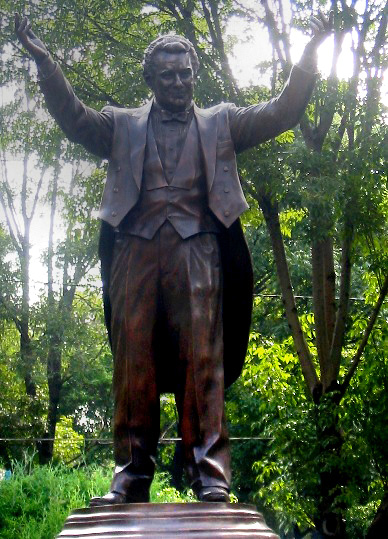
Statue of Domingo in Mexico City in recognition of his contributions to 1985 Mexico City earthquake victims and his artistic works

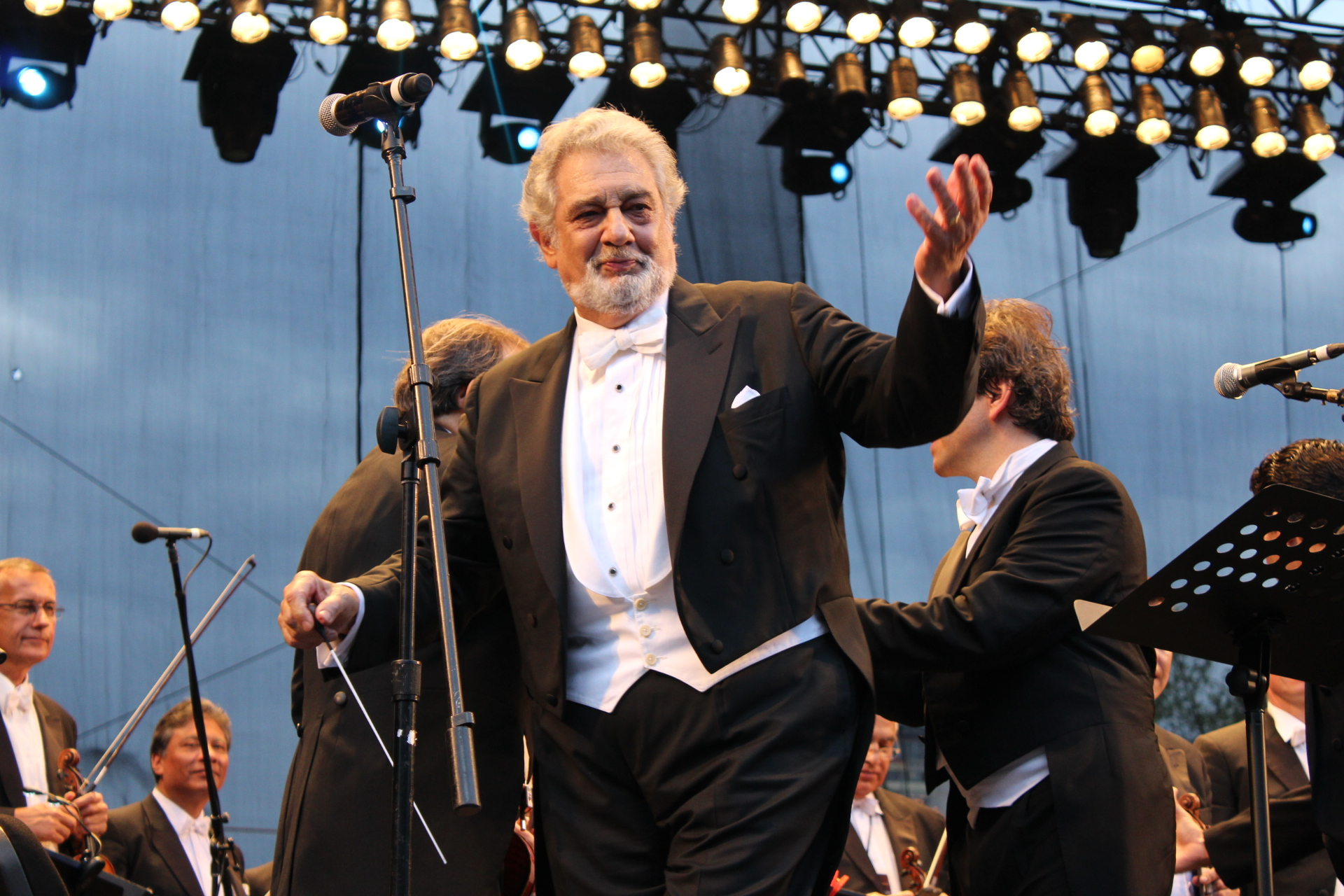
Domingo at the 30 year commemoration of the 1985 Mexico City earthquake

Domingo has been heavily involved in humanitarian efforts and volunteerism. He has given many benefit concerts for disaster relief, charities, and musical organizations, as well as served in various voluntary positions in the artistic and sports worlds. In 1986, Domingo performed at several benefit concerts to raise funds for the victims of the 1985 Mexico City earthquake. He also released an album of one of the events for charity. On 21 August 2007, in recognition of his support of the earthquake victims, as well as his artistic works, a statue in his honor was unveiled. It was made in Mexico City from keys donated by the people. The statue, the work of Alejandra Zúñiga, is two meters tall, weighs about 300 kg (660 lbs) and is part of the "Grandes valores" (Great values) program.

Since the earthquake, Domingo has continued to do charitable work in Mexico and other countries. After Hurricane Pauline ravaged the Pacific coast of Southern Mexico in 1997, he gave two charity concerts in Acapulco to raise money to build 150 new houses for those made homeless by the storm. In December 2003, he performed in Cancún to benefit the Ciudad de la Alegria Foundation, which provides assistance and lodging to people in need, including low-income individuals, orphans, expectant mothers, immigrants, rehabilitated legal offenders, and the terminally ill. Outside of Mexico, Domingo and Katherine Jenkins performed in a charity concert in Athens on 27 June 2007 to raise funds to aid victims of the conflict in Darfur. The concert was organized by Médecins Sans Frontières (Doctors Without Borders).

On 4 March 2006, Domingo sang at the New Orleans Opera Association's Gala Benefit Concert, "A Night For New Orleans", to help rebuild the city after it was partially destroyed by Hurricane Katrina. Before the gala, he made the encouraging statement: "MUSIC IS THE VOICE OF HOPE!". Operalia winner Elizabeth Futral and several other popular opera singers appeared with the tenor. The Gala collected $700,000 for the city recovery fund. On 23 March 2008, the New Orleans City Council named the city theatre's stage in the Mahalia Jackson Theater in Louis Armstrong Park the "Plácido Domingo stage", in honour of his contribution at the Gala Benefits Concert. Early the following year, Domingo performed with the New Orleans Opera in a gala reopening the theatre. At the time he told the press, "The restoration of New Orleans' Mahalia Jackson Theater is a symbol of new life for the city following the devastation of 2005, but in these difficult economic times, it is also a symbol of hope and faith in the future on the part of a forward-looking artistic organization."

In June 2010 Domingo became President of Europa Nostra, the Voice of Cultural Heritage in Europe, which helps to promote European high culture. The following year, FIFA president Sepp Blatter invited Domingo to join a council intended to clean up the football governing body, which had been accused of taking bribes from countries that wanted to stage the World Cup. Domingo has also supported environmental efforts. In 2007, he joined several other preeminent figures in entertainment, government, the environment and more, as one of the users of the BMW Hydrogen 7, designed to build support for hydrogen as a viable alternative to fossil fuels. Domingo also supports the Hear the World initiative as an ambassador to raise awareness for the topic of hearing and hearing loss.

=== Operalia and young artists programs ===
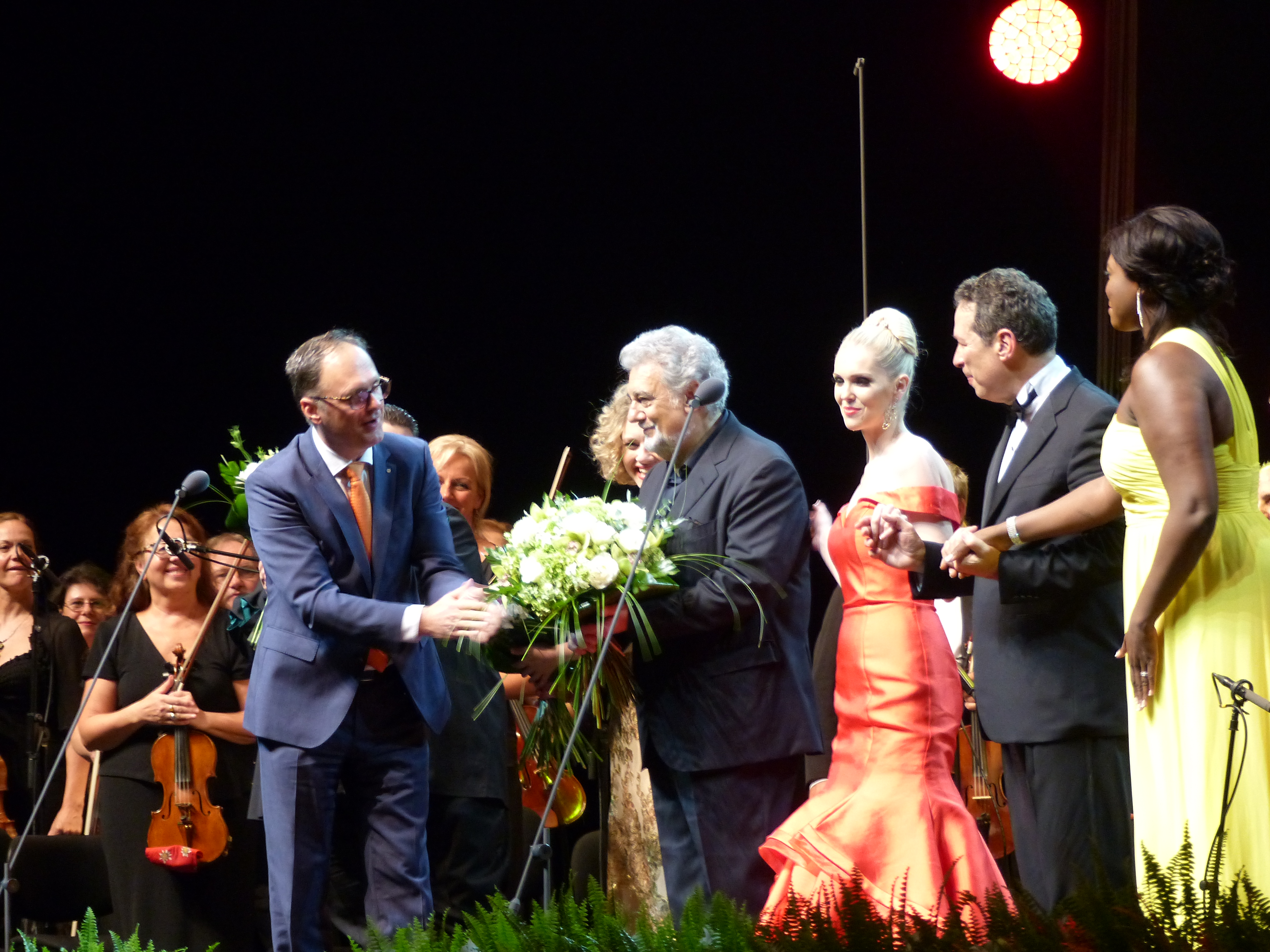
Domingo with young Operalia singers, Budapest, 2016

Domingo has especially tried to aid the development of young opera singers' careers. In 1993 he founded Operalia, The World Opera Competition, an international opera competition for talented young singers. The winners get the opportunity to be employed in opera ensembles around the world.

Several leading opera singers of recent years have won prizes in the competition, including Joseph Calleja, Joyce DiDonato, Erwin Schrott, Giuseppe Filianoti, Angel Blue, Aida Garifullina, Sonya Yoncheva, David Bizic, Ana María Martínez, Nina Stemme and José Cura. In particular, Domingo has performed frequently with Mexican tenor Rolando Villazón, who won three prizes at the 1999 Operalia competition.

Beyond Operalia, Domingo has been instrumental in giving many young artists encouragement and special attention, as in 2001, when he invited the so-called "Singing Policeman", New York tenor Daniel Rodríguez, to attend the Vilar-Domingo Young Artists program to develop his operatic skills.

In addition to the Vilar-Domingo Young Artists Program in Washington, D.C., Domingo has also started programs to train young opera singers at the Los Angeles Opera and the Palau de les Arts Reina Sofia in Valencia, Spain.

In September 2016, he performed at a Los Angeles benefit for the Esperanza Azteca Los Angeles Youth Orchestra supporting young musicians from the Los Angeles area.

== Writings ==
Date	Title	Publisher	ISBN	Pages	Author(s)
September 1983	My First Forty Years	Alfred A. Knopf	ISBN 0-394-52329-6	256	Plácido Domingo
1983	Jacqueline du Pré: Impressions	Vanguard Press	ISBN 0814908675	141	William Wordsworth; Plácido Domingo
December 1994	Opera 101: A Complete Guide to Learning and Loving Opera	Hyperion	ISBN 0-7868-8025-2	494	Fred Plotkin; Plácido Domingo
July 1997	Christmas With Plácido Domingo: Trumpets Sound And Angels Sing	Alfred Publishing Company	ISBN 0-89524-321-0	80	Plácido Domingo; Milton Okun
July 1997	Bajo el Cielo Español (Under the Spanish Sky)	Warner Brothers Publications	ISBN 0-7692-0024-9	84	Plácido Domingo; Carol Cuéllar
March 1999	Plácido Domingo: Por Amor	Hal Leonard Corporation	ISBN 0-7119-7258-3	104	Plácido Domingo
January 2003	The Zarzuela Companion	Scarecrow Press	ISBN 0810844478	352	Christopher Webber; Plácido Domingo
March 2003	Plácido Domingo: My Operatic Roles	Baskerville Publishers, Incorporated	ISBN 1-880909-61-8	319	Helena Matheopoulos; Plácido Domingo
March 2007	Leoncavallo: Life and Works	Rowman & Littlefield Publishers, Inc	ISBN 0-8108-5873-8; ISBN 0-8108-5880-0	349; 351	Konrad Dryden; Plácido Domingo
December 2007	So When Does the Fat Lady Sing?	Hal Leonard Corporation	ISBN 1-57467-162-6	173	Michael Walsh; Plácido Domingo

== See also ==
- Bust of Plácido Domingo
- Category:Plácido Domingo albums
- List of best-selling Latin music artists
