= Plácido Domingo Jr. =

Mexican singer-songwriter (born 1965)

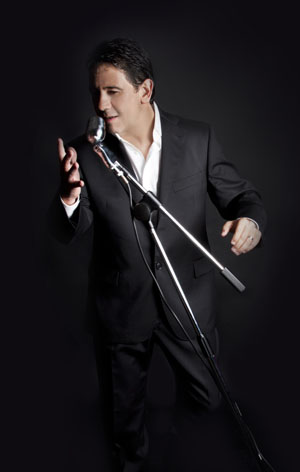
- Born: Plácido Francisco Domingo Ornelas; 21 October 1965 (age 60); Mexico City, Mexico
- Occupations: Singer, songwriter, record producer
- Spouse: Samantha Domingo (divorced)
- Children: 3
- Parents: Plácido Domingo (father); Marta Domingo (mother)

Plácido Francisco Domingo Ornelas (born 21 October 1965), better known as Plácido Domingo Jr., is a Mexican-Spanish singer, songwriter and record producer.

== Early life ==
Born in Mexico City to Plácido Domingo and Marta Ornelas, from an early age he was exposed to the operatic world and developed a passion for music.

== Music career ==
Domingo Jr. has written songs for many singers including Michael Bolton, Sarah Brightman, Diana Ross and his father.

He participates in the released of album Amore Infinito in 2009 as an executive producer and songwriter; also performed duet with his father. The album which includes verses by Pope John Paul II sung by his father reached the top chart on Billboard Magazine's Top Classical Crossover Albums in 2010.

In 2010, together with SonicProjects Records, Domingo Jr. made his international debut as a performer, collaborating with Grammy award winner producer Juan Cristóbal Losada, with whom he created a Christmas EP called Songs for Christmas - Canciones de Navidad.

He releases his first album Latidos in Spanish language in April 2017, followed with the English version, Heartbeat in the third quarter of 2017. It includes 11 popular songs from the 50s and 60s with influences of Latin pop, jazz, tango, bolero, cha-cha-cha and bachata, with orchestral arrangements and duets with renowned artists like José Feliciano, Plácido Domingo, Arturo Sandoval, among others.

== Film Credits ==
- "Piel" (2003)
- "Entre Líneas" (2011)
- "Sol de Medianoche" (2016)

== Personal life ==
Domingo Jr. was married to Samantha, whom he met in 1994 through their involvement in the Church of Scientology. They have three daughters together. After they divorced, Domingo Jr. left Scientology in 2011.
