= List of awards and nominations received by Plácido Domingo =

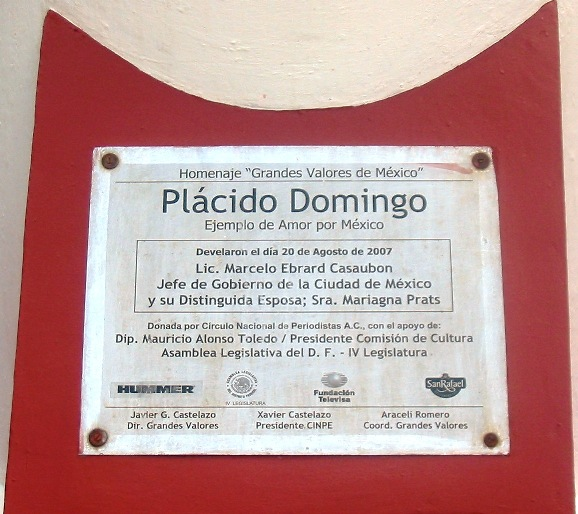
An appreciation note on his statue in Mexico City

Plácido Domingo has received numerous awards and honors, including:

== Grammy Awards ==
- 1971: Principal Soloist for Best Opera Recording for Verdi: Aida
- 1974: Principal Soloist for Best Opera Recording for G. Puccini: La bohème
- 1983: Principal Soloist for Best Opera Recording for Verdi: La traviata
- 1984: Principal Soloist for Best Opera Recording for Bizet: Carmen
- 1984: Best Latin Pop Performance for Always in My Heart (Siempre en mi corazon)
- 1988: Principal Soloist for Best Opera Recording for Wagner: Lohengrin
- 1990: Best Classical Vocal Performance for Carreras Domingo Pavarotti in Concert
- 1992: Principal Soloist for Best Opera Recording for Strauss: Die Frau ohne Schatten
- 2000: Best Mexican-American Performance for 100 Years of Mariachi

== Latin Grammy Awards ==
- 2000: Best Classical Album for T. Breton: La Dolores
- 2001: Best Classical Album for I. Albéniz: Merlin
- 2008: Best Classical Album for various composers: Pasión Española
- 2010: Latin Recording Academy Person of the Year
- 2014: Best Classical Album for Verdi: Baritone Arias

== Government and organization honors ==
Austria

- Austrian Cross of Honour for Science and Art, 1st class (1992)
- Kammersänger und Ehrenmitglied der Wiener Staatsoper
- Goldenes Ehrenzeichen für Verdienste um das Land Wien – 2007
- Grand Decoration of Honour in Silver for Services to the Republic of Austria (2007)

France

- Chevalier of the Légion d'honneur
- Commandeur of the Ordre des Arts et des Lettres
- Grande Médaille de la Ville de Paris
- Commandeur of the Légion d'Honneur – March 2002

Italy

- Grand Officer of the Order of Merit of the Italian Republic – 3 April 1991
- Knight Grand Cross Order of Merit of the Italian Republic – 2 April 1997

Japan

- Praemium Imperiale - 2013

Mexico

- Orden del Águila Azteca, (Mexico).

Monaco

- Commander of the Order of Cultural Merit (November 1999)

Spain

- Premio Príncipe de Asturias – 18 October 1991
- Knight Grand Cross of the Order of Civil Merit – 20 September 2002
- Knight Grand Cross of the Order of Arts and Letters of Spain – 14 January 2011
- Knight Grand Cross of the Order of Isabella the Catholic – 20 January 2011
- Knight Grand Cross of the Civil Order of Alfonso X, the Wise – 7 October 2016

Sweden

- Birgit Nilsson Prize, inaugural recipient (20 February 2009)

Portugal

- Knight Grand Cross of the Order of Prince Henry – 1 July 1998
- Knight Grand Cross of the Order of Public Instruction – 31 August 2018

United Kingdom

- Honorary Knight Commander of the Order of the British Empire (KBE) – October 2002

USA

- Kennedy Center Honors – 3 December 2000
- The Presidential Medal of Freedom – 9 July 2002

Venezuela

- Keys to the city of Caracas - September 2009

Other countries

- Knight Grand Cross OMRI (Italy) – 2 April 1997
- Cavalliere di Malta (Malta)
- Order of the Cedars (Lebanon) (2004)
- Medal of Honour (Oman) - October 2011

NPO

- UNICEF Socio de Honor (UNICEF)

== Honorary doctorates ==
- Royal Northern College of Music, England (1982)
- Philadelphia College of Performing Arts, USA (1982)
- Oklahoma City University, USA (1984)
- Universidad Complutense de Madrid, Spain (1989)
- New York University, USA (1990)
- Georgetown University, USA (1992)
- Washington College of Chestertown, USA (2000)
- Anáhuac University, Mexico (2001)
- Chopin Music Academy, Poland (2003)
- Oxford University, England (2003)
- California State University, Stanislaus, USA (2010)
- Harvard University, USA (2011)
- Universidad Europea de Madrid, Spain (2013)
- University of Murcia, Spain (2014)
- Berklee College of Music, USA (2014)
- University of Salamanca, Spain (2015)
- Manhattan School of Music, USA (2018)

== Other ==
- In the 1980s, a Sesame Street muppet was named in his honor: Placido Flamingo.
- A star on the Hollywood Walk of Fame – 1993 (Location: Domingo, Placido LT 7000 Hollywood Blvd)
- The Excellence Award at the 1991 Lo Nuestro Awards.
- A star on the Kunstmeile (Art Mile) in Vienna (2008)
- Sociedad General de Autores Española (Best Lyric Singer of the Year 1997) for his role in the world premiere of "Divinas Palabras" (1997)
- Association of Argentinian Music Critics (Best Male Singer in 1997) for “Samson and Dalila" (1997)
- Baltika Grand Prix for Outstanding Achievement (June 1998)
- American Latina Media Arts (ALMA) Awards (Outstanding Performances By An Individual or Act in A Variety) (1998)
- Hispanic Heritage Award for Arts (September 1999)
- Great Prize of the International Music Press (September 2000)
- The Ella Award, the Society of Singers Lifetime Achievement Award (2002)
- Opera News Award for distinguished achievement, inaugural recipient, 2005
- Classical BRIT Awards (2006) (Critics' Award for Tristan und Isolde and Lifetime Achievement Award
- Domingo was named "The King of singers" in BBC Music Magazine for April 2008 issue. He was voted as the greatest tenor in history by 16 renowned opera critics in a quest to find the world top 20 operatic tenors. The headline of the page stated: "The king of the singers – The critics number 1 choice. Domingo is that rarest vocal phenomena, a tenor who uses his voice in the service of re-creating great art, and not as a thrilling end in itself."
- BAMBI award in 1985 and 2008
- In 2009 Domingo was appointed the inaugural Washington Ambassador to the Arts by Guide for the Arts.
- Plácido Domingo is an Honorary Member of the Royal Academy of Music (Hon Ram) since 2000.
- The King of Sweden awarded Plácido Domingo with the first Birgit Nilsson Prize in October 2009. With one million dollars, it is the biggest prize in classical music.
- Also in October 2009, he received the German Echo Award for Lifetime Achievement.
- Anton Coppola Excellence in the Arts Award (2011 recipient)

== See also ==
- List of recordings by Plácido Domingo
- The Three Tenors
- Christmas in Vienna I, II, III, and VI
- Grammy Award for Best Opera Recording
- Category:Plácido Domingo albums
