= Repertoire of Plácido Domingo =

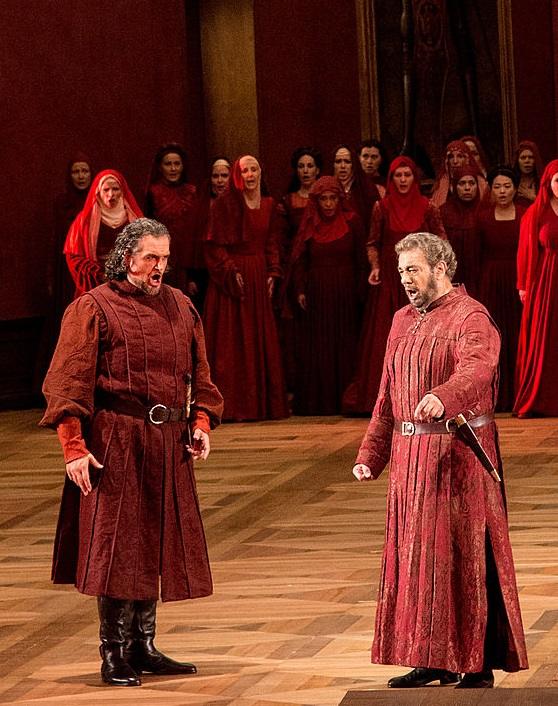
Domingo (right) as the Conte di Luna in Il trovatore with Riccardo Zanellato at the 2014 Salzburg Festival

Spanish tenor Plácido Domingo has sung 151 roles in Italian, French, German, English, Spanish and Russian. His main repertoire however is Italian (Otello, Cavaradossi in Tosca, Don Carlo, Des Grieux in Manon Lescaut, Dick Johnson in La fanciulla del West, Radames in Aida), French (Faust, Werther, Don José in Carmen, Samson in Samson et Dalila), and German (Lohengrin, Parsifal, and Siegmund in Die Walküre). Domingo currently continues to add more operas to his repertoire. Since 2009, he has moved substantially into the baritone repertoire, especially focusing on Verdi baritone roles. In 2015, he made his most recent debuts as Macbeth at the Berlin State Opera, Don Carlo in Ernani at the Metropolitan Opera, and Gianni Schicchi at the Los Angeles Opera. Tim Page, a Pulitzer Prize-winner for music criticism, described Domingo in a 1996 Washington Post article as "the most versatile, intelligent and altogether accomplished operatic tenor now before the public".

Domingo's official repertoire list includes all of his operatic roles on stage and recordings, as well as his zarzuela and operetta debuts made in opera houses and on recordings since his operatic debut on 23 September 1959. One exception to this is Arturo in Donizetti's opera Lucia di Lammermoor, in which he made his role debut on 28 October 1961 in Guadalajara, Mexico, and his U.S. operatic debut on 16 November of the same year at Dallas Civic Opera in Dallas, Texas. The only other exception is his performance as Antonio in Cano's modern opera, Luna, in which he appeared on an abridged recording in 1997 and in a concert performance at the Palau de la Música de València on 15 May 1998.

The official list does not include his previous roles in zarzuelas or musicals with his parents' company or theaters in Mexico prior to September 1959, nor does it include his performance as the Spanish painter Francisco Goya in the musical, Goya: A Life in Song, which he recorded in both English and Spanish-language versions. It also contains only a fraction of his sung symphonic works, excluding his performances of the tenor parts in Verdi and Andrew Lloyd Webber's Requiems and Beethoven's Ninth Symphony, Missa Solemnis, and Christus am Ölberge, among others. Some small parts sung during the same performance are listed as only one role. Danilo in The Merry Widow is listed twice: once together with Camille in a Spanish-language translation early in his career and later alone in English translation at the Metropolitan Opera. Domingo alternated the parts of Camille and Danilo during his first run of the operetta at the Palacio de Bellas Artes in 1960.

== Role debuts ==
These lists are sortable, e.g. by opera title, composer, location, or date. Operas and other works, in which Domingo appeared in world premieres, are marked in bold. All roles are tenor parts except where noted.

=== Official repertoire ===
Year	#	Title	Composer	Role	Debut date	Opera house / studio recording	Location	Genre
1959	1	Rigoletto	Verdi	Borsa	23 September 1959	Palacio de Bellas Artes	Mexico City	opera
	2	Dialogues of the Carmelites	Poulenc	Chaplain	21 October 1959	Palacio de Bellas Artes	Mexico City	opera
1960	3	The Merry Widow	Lehár	Danilo (tenor or baritone), Camille	1960	Palacio de Bellas Artes	Mexico City	operetta
	4	Turandot	Puccini	Altoum	11 September 1960	Teatro de la Ciudad	Monterrey	opera
	5	Turandot	Puccini	Pang	1 October 1960	Teatro de la Ciudad	Monterrey	opera
	6	Lucia di Lammermoor	Donizetti	Normanno	5 October 1960	Teatro de la Ciudad	Monterrey	opera
	7	La traviata	Verdi	Gastone	8 October 1960	Teatro de la Ciudad	Monterrey	opera
	8	Carmen	Bizet	Remendado	15 October 1960	Teatro de la Ciudad	Monterrey	opera
	9	Otello	Verdi	Cassio	17 October 1960	Teatro de la Ciudad	Monterrey	opera
1961	10	La traviata	Verdi	Alfredo	19 May 1961	Teatro de la Ciudad	Monterrey	opera
	11	**El último sueño**	Vázquez	Enrique	28 May 1961	Palacio de Bellas Artes	Mexico City	opera
	12	Amelia goes to the ball	Menotti	Lover	28 June 1961	Palacio de Bellas Artes	Mexico City	opera
	13	Fedora	Giordano	Désire, Baron Rouvel	2 July 1961	Palacio de Bellas Artes	Mexico City	opera
	14	Boris Godunov	Mussorgsky	Simpleton, Shuisky	8 August 1961	Palacio de Bellas Artes	Mexico City	opera
	15	Andrea Chénier	Giordano	Abbé, Incredibile	15 August 1961	Palacio de Bellas Artes	Mexico City	opera
	16	Tosca	Puccini	Spoletta	21 August 1961	Palacio de Bellas Artes	Mexico City	opera
	17	Madama Butterfly	Puccini	Goro	15 September 1961	Palacio de Bellas Artes	Mexico City	opera
	18	Tosca	Puccini	Cavaradossi	30 September 1961	Palacio de Bellas Artes	Mexico City	opera
1962	19	La bohème	Puccini	Rodolfo	4 March 1962	Palacio de Bellas Artes	Mexico City	opera
	20	Così fan tutte	Mozart	Ferrando	10 May 1962	Palacio de Bellas Artes	Mexico City	opera
	21	Adriana Lecouvreur	Cilea	Maurizio	17 May 1962	Palacio de Bellas Artes	Mexico City	opera
	22	Trittico Francescano	Refice		1 October 1962	Teatro Degollado	Guadalajara	oratorio
	23	Madama Butterfly	Puccini	Pinkerton	7 October 1962	Teatro Isauro Martínez	Torreón	opera
	24	Lucia di Lammermoor	Donizetti	Edgardo	26 November 1962	Fort Worth Opera	Fort Worth	opera
1963	25	Carmen	Bizet	José	25 June 1963	Israeli Opera House	Tel Aviv	opera
	26	Don Giovanni	Mozart	Don Ottavio	21 September 1963	Israeli Opera House	Tel Aviv	opera
	27	Faust	Gounod	Faust	3 December 1963	Israeli Opera House	Tel Aviv	opera
1964	28	Les pêcheurs de perles	Bizet	Nadir	21 January 1964	Israeli Opera House	Tel Aviv	opera
	29	Eugene Onegin	Tchaikovsky	Lensky	5 September 1964	Israeli Opera House	Tel Aviv	opera
1965	30	Cavalleria rusticana	Mascagni	Turiddu	21 January 1965	Israeli Opera House	Tel Aviv	opera
	31	Samson and Delilah	Saint-Saëns	Samson	30 July 1965	Chautauqua Opera	Chautauqua	opera
	32	Les contes d'Hoffmann	Offenbach	Hoffmann	7 September 1965	Palacio de Bellas Artes	Mexico City	opera
1966	33	Carlota, Severino, La mulata de Córdoba	Sandi, Moreno, Moncayo	Maximiliano, Rezador, Anselmo	1 January 1966	Gran Teatre del Liceu	Barcelona	opera
	34	Don Rodrigo	Ginastera	Don Rodrigo	22 February 1966	New York City Opera	New York	opera
	35	Andrea Chénier	Giordano	Andrea Chénier	3 March 1966	New Orleans Opera	New Orleans	opera
	36	Hippolyte et Aricie	Rameau	Hippolyte	6 April 1966	Opera Company of Boston	Boston	opera
	37	Pagliacci	Leoncavallo	Canio	9 August 1966	Metropolitan Opera	New York	opera
	38	The Barber of Seville	Rossini	Almaviva	16 September 1966	Teatro Degollado	Guadalajara	opera
	39	Anna Bolena	Donizetti	Lord Percy	15 November 1966	Metropolitan Opera	New York	opera
1967	40	Il tabarro	Puccini	Luigi	8 March 1967	Metropolitan Opera	New York	opera
	41	Aida	Verdi	Radames	11 May 1967	Hamburg State Opera	Hamburg	opera
	42	Don Carlo	Verdi	Don Carlo	19 May 1967	Vienna State Opera	Vienna	opera
	43	Un ballo in maschera	Verdi	Riccardo	31 May 1967	Deutsche Oper Berlin	Berlin	opera
1968	44	Lohengrin	Wagner	Lohengrin	14 January 1968	Hamburg State Opera	Hamburg	opera
	45	Manon Lescaut	Puccini	Des Grieux	15 February 1968	Connecticut Opera	Hartford	opera
	46	Il trovatore	Verdi	Manrico	14 March 1968	New Orleans Opera	New Orleans	opera
1969	47	Rigoletto	Verdi	Il Duca	2 January 1969	Hamburg State Opera	Hamburg	opera
	48	La forza del destino	Verdi	Don Alvaro	18 January 1969	Hamburg State Opera	Hamburg	opera
	49	Manon	Massenet	Des Grieux	20 February 1969	Metropolitan Opera	New York	opera
	50	Turandot	Puccini	Calaf	16 July 1969	Verona Arena	Verona	opera
	51	Ernani	Verdi	Ernani	7 December 1969	Teatro alla Scala	Milan	opera
1970	52	Oberon	Weber	Hüon	March 1970	Bayerischer Rundfunk studio	Studio	opera
	53	La Gioconda	Ponchielli	Enzo	14 May 1970	Teatro de la Zarzuela	Madrid	opera
	54	Roberto Devereux	Donizetti	Devereux	15 October 1970	New York City Opera	New York	opera
1971	55	Der Rosenkavalier	R. Strauss	Italian singer	March 1971		Studio	opera
	56	I Lombardi alla prima crociata	Verdi	Oronte	July 1971	Royal Philharmonic, London	Studio	opera
	57	Luisa Miller	Verdi	Rodolfo	4 November 1971	Metropolitan Opera	New York	opera
1972	58	Giovanna d'Arco	Verdi	Carlo VII	August 1972		Studio	opera
	59	Los claveles	Serrano	Fernando	1972		Studio	zarzuela
	60	La dolorosa	Serrano	Rafael	1972		Studio	zarzuela
1973	61	Francesca da Rimini	Zandonai	Paolo	22 March 1973	Metropolitan Opera	New York	opera
	62	L'Africaine	Meyerbeer	Vasco da Gama	3 November 1973	War Memorial Opera House	San Francisco	opera
1974	63	I vespri siciliani	Verdi	Arrigo	9 April 1974	Palais Garnier	Paris	opera
	64	Mefistofele	Boito	Faust	July 1974		Studio	opera
	65	Roméo et Juliette	Gounod	Roméo	28 September 1974	Metropolitan Opera	New York	opera
	66	La fanciulla del West	Puccini	Dick Johnson	26 November 1974	Teatro Regio di Torino	Turin	opera
1975	67	La Navarraise	Massenet	Araquil	1975		Studio	opera
	68	Otello	Verdi	Otello	28 September 1975	Hamburg State Opera	Hamburg	opera
1976	69	Gianni Schicchi	Puccini	Rinuccio	1976		Studio	opera
	70	Louise	Charpentier	Julien	1976		Studio	opera
	71	Macbeth	Verdi	Macduff	1976		Studio	opera
	72	Die Meistersinger von Nürnberg	Wagner	Walther von Stolzing	March, 1976		Studio	opera
	73	Le Cid	Massenet	Don Rodrigue	8 March 1976	Opera Orchestra of New York	Carnegie Hall, New York	opera
	74	L'amore dei tre re	Montemezzi	Avito	July 1976		Studio	opera
1977	75	L'elisir d'amore	Donizetti	Nemorino	1977		Studio	opera
	76	Fedora	Giordano	Loris	15 February 1977	Gran Teatre del Liceu	Barcelona	opera
	77	Werther	Massenet	Werther	18 December 1977	Bavarian State Opera	Munich	opera
1978	78	La damnation de Faust	Berlioz	Faust	January 1978		Studio	oratorio/opera
1979	79	Le Villi	Puccini	Roberto	June 1979		Studio	opera
	80	Requiem	Berlioz	Tenor part	June 1979		Studio	oratorio
	81	Béatrice et Bénédict	Berlioz	Bénédict	July 1979		Studio	opera
	82	Il Giuramento	Mercadante	Viscardo	9 September 1979	Vienna State Opera	Vienna	opera
1980	83	**El poeta**	Moreno Torroba	José de Espronceda	19 June 1980	Teatro Real	Madrid	opera
1981	84	Norma	Bellini	Pollione	21 September 1981	Metropolitan Opera	New York	opera
1982	85	La rondine	Puccini	Ruggero	1982		Studio	opera
	86	Nabucco	Verdi	Ismaele	May 1982		Studio	opera
1983	87	Les Troyens	Berlioz	Enée	26 September 1983	Metropolitan Opera	New York	opera
1986	88	Die Fledermaus	J. Strauss	Alfred	April 1986		Studio	operetta
	89	**Goya**	Menotti	Goya	15 November 1986	Washington National Opera	Washington	opera
1988	90	Iris	Mascagni	Osaka	1988		Studio	opera
	91	Tannhäuser	Wagner	Tannhäuser	April 1988		Studio	opera
1989	92	Die Frau ohne Schatten	R. Strauss	Der Kaiser	March 1989		Studio	opera
1990	93	Man of La Mancha	Leigh	Don Quixote	June 1990		Studio	musical
1991	94	The Flying Dutchman	Wagner	Erik	February 1991		Studio	opera
	95	Parsifal	Wagner	Parsifal	14 March 1991	Metropolitan Opera	New York	opera
1992	96	The Barber of Seville	Rossini	Figaro (baritone)	February 1992		Studio	opera
	97	El gato montés	Penella	Rafaele Ruiz	7 August 1992	Teatro de la Maestranza	Seville	opera
	98	Die Walküre	Wagner	Siegmund	19 December 1992	Vienna State Opera	Vienna	opera
1993	99	Stiffelio	Verdi	Stiffelio	21 October 1993	Metropolitan Opera	New York	opera
1994	100	Doña Francisquita	Vives	Fernando	February 1994		Studio	zarzuela
	101	La verbena de la Paloma	Bretón	Julian	April 1994		Studio	zarzuela
	102	Il Guarany	Gomes	Pery	5 June 1994	Bonn Opera House	Bonn	opera
	103	Idomeneo	Mozart	Idomeneo	1 November 1994	Metropolitan Opera	New York	opera
	104	Hérodiade	Massenet	Jean	8 November 1994	War Memorial Opera House	San Francisco	opera
1995	105	Luisa Fernanda	Torroba	Javier	1995		Studio	zarzuela
	106	Simon Boccanegra (1881 version)	Verdi	Adorno	19 January 1995	Metropolitan Opera	New York	opera
1996	107	La tabernera del puerto	Sorozábal	Leandro	1996		Studio	zarzuela
1997	108	Simon Boccanegra (1857 version)	Verdi	Adorno	28 June 1997	Royal Opera House	London	opera
	109	**Divinas Palabras**	Abril	Lucero	18 October 1997	Teatro Real	Madrid	opera
1998	110	Le prophète	Meyerbeer	Jean de Leyde	21 May 1998	Vienna State Opera	Vienna	opera
	111	Faust Symphony	Liszt	Tenor part	June 1998		Studio	symphonic
	112	La Dolores	Bretón	Lázaro	July 1998		Studio	opera/zarzuela
1999	113	Das Lied von der Erde	Mahler	Tenor part	February 1999		Studio	symphonic
	114	**Misa Tango**	Bacalov	Tenor part	February 1999		Studio	oratorio
	115	The Queen of Spades	Tchaikovsky	Hermann	18 March 1999	Metropolitan Opera	New York	opera
	116	Fidelio	Beethoven	Florestan	June 1999		Studio	opera
	117	Merlin	Albéniz	King Arthur	July 1999	Orquesta Nacional de España, Madrid	Studio	opera
	118	Margarita la tornera	Chapí	Don Juan de Alarcón	11 December 1999	Teatro Real	Madrid	zarzuela
2000	119	La Gran Vía	Chueca	Caballero de Gracía	January 2000		Studio	zarzuela
	120	The Merry Widow	Lehár	Danilo (tenor or baritone)	17 February 2000	Metropolitan Opera	New York	operetta
	121	La battaglia di Legnano	Verdi	Arrigo	30 June 2000	Royal Opera House	London	opera
2001	122	La Revoltosa	Chapí	Felipe	January 2001		Studio	zarzuela
2002	123	Sly	Wolf-Ferrari	Christopher Sly	1 April 2002	Metropolitan Opera	New York	opera
2003	124	Luisa Fernanda	Torroba	Vidal Hernando (baritone)	18 June 2003	Teatro alla Scala	Milan	zarzuela
	125	**Nicholas and Alexandra**	Drattell	Rasputin	14 September 2003	Los Angeles Opera	Los Angeles	opera
2005	126	Tristan und Isolde	Wagner	Tristan	January 2005	EMI Abbey Road Studio 1, London	Studio	opera
	127	Cyrano de Bergerac	Alfano	Cyrano	13 May 2005	Metropolitan Opera	New York	opera
	128	Pepita Jiménez	Albéniz	Don Luis de Vargas	June 2005		Studio	opera
2006	129	Edgar	Puccini	Edgar	2006		Studio	opera
	130	**The First Emperor**	Tan	Emperor Qin	21 December 2006	Metropolitan Opera	New York	opera
2007	131	Iphigénie en Tauride	Gluck	Oreste (mix of baritone and tenor versions)	27 November 2007	Metropolitan Opera	New York	opera
2008	132	Tamerlano	Handel	Bajazet	26 March 2008	Teatro Real	Madrid	opera
2009	133	Simon Boccanegra	Verdi	Simon Boccanegra (baritone)	24 October 2009	Berlin State Opera	Berlin	opera
2010	134	La Nuit de Mai	Leoncavallo	Tenor part	2010		Studio	symphonic
	135	I Medici	Leoncavallo	Giuliano Medici	2010		Studio	opera
	136	Rigoletto	Verdi	Rigoletto (baritone)	1 August 2010	Reignwood Theater	Beijing	opera
	137	**Il Postino**	Catán	Pablo Neruda	23 September 2010	Los Angeles Opera	Los Angeles	opera
2011	138	**The Enchanted Island**	Various	Neptune	31 December 2011	Metropolitan Opera	New York	pasticcio/opera
2012	139	Thaïs	Massenet	Athanaël (baritone)	25 March 2012	Palau de les Arts Reina Sofía	Valencia	opera
	140	I due Foscari	Verdi	Francesco Foscari (baritone)	15 September 2012	Los Angeles Opera	Los Angeles	opera
2013	141	La traviata	Verdi	Giorgio Germont (baritone)	14 March 2013	Metropolitan Opera	New York	opera
	142	Nabucco	Verdi	Nabucco (baritone)	15 April 2013	Royal Opera House	London	opera
	143	Giovanna d'Arco	Verdi	Giacomo (baritone)	6 August 2013	Salzburg Festival	Salzburg	opera
	144	Il trovatore	Verdi	Conte di Luna (baritone)	29 November 2013	Schiller Theater	Berlin	opera
2015	145	Macbeth	Verdi	Macbeth (baritone)	7 February 2015	Schiller Theater	Berlin	opera
	146	Ernani	Verdi	Don Carlo (baritone)	20 March 2015	Metropolitan Opera	New York	opera
	147	Gianni Schicchi	Puccini	Gianni Schicchi (baritone)	12 September 2015	Los Angeles Opera	Los Angeles	opera
2017	148	Don Carlo	Verdi	Rodrigo di Posa (baritone)	11 June 2017	Wiener Staatsoper	Wien	opera
2018	149	Luisa Miller	Verdi	Miller (baritone)	29 March 2018	Metropolitan Opera	New York	opera
	150	Les pêcheurs de perles	Bizet	Zurga (baritone)	23 August 2018	Salzburg Festival	Salzburg	opera
2019	151	El gato montés	Penella	Juanillo (baritone)	4 May 2019	Los Angeles Opera	Los Angeles	opera
2022	152	Aida	Verdi	Amonasro (baritone)	25 August 2022	Verona Arena	Verona	opera

=== Additional roles (partial) ===
Year	#	Title	Composer	Role	Debut date	Opera house / studio recording	Location	Genre
1957	1	Gigantes y cabezudos	Fernández Caballero	Baritone part	1957		Mexico City	zarzuela
1958-9	2	Luisa Fernanda	Moreno Torroba	Javier & other parts	1958		Veracruz	zarzuela
	3	El gato montés	Penella	Rafael Ruiz	1958		Mexico	opera
	4	La calesera	Alonso	Baritone part	1958/1959		Mexico	zarzuela
	5	El balcón de palacio	Romo	Baritone part	1958/1959		Mexico	zarzuela
	6	Katiuska, la mujer rusa	Sorozábal	Baritone part	1958/1959		Mexico	zarzuela
	7	Los gavilanes	Guerrero	Baritone part	1958/1959		Mexico	zarzuela
1959	8	Mi bella dama (My Fair Lady)	Loewe	Alfie Doolittle's friend	19 January 1959	Teatro María Teresa Montoya	Monterrey	musical
	9	Marina	Arrieta	Pascual (bass or baritone)	12 May 1959	Teatro Degollado	Guadalajara	opera/zarzuela
1960	10	La Pelirroja (The Readhead)	Hague	The Tenor	11 February 1960	Teatro de los Insurgentes	Mexico City	musical
1961	11	Lucia di Lammermoor	Donizetti	Arturo	28 October 1961	Palacio de Bellas Artes	Guadalajara	opera
1962	12	Ninth Symphony	Beethoven	Tenor part	10 August 1962		Mexico City	symphonic
1965	13	Messiah	Händel	Tenor part	10 December 1965		Boston	oratorio
1966	14	Elijah	Mendelssohn	Tenor part	26 May 1966		Mexico City	oratorio
1967	15	Creation Mass	Haydn	Tenor part	23 February 1967		Boston	oratorio
1969	16	Requiem	Verdi	Tenor part	20 May 1969		London	oratorio
1970	17	Missa Solemnis	Beethoven	Tenor part	23 May 1970	St. Peter's Basilica	Rome	oratorio
1984	18	**Requiem**	Lloyd Webber	Tenor part	1984 (studio); 25 February 1985 (live)	St. Thomas Church	Studio; New York	oratorio
1989	19	**Goya: A Life in Song**	Yeston	Goya	March 1989		Studio	musical
1998	20	**Luna**	Cano	Antonio	15 June 1998	Palau de la Música de València	Valencia	opera
2003	21	Christus am Ölberge	Beethoven	Jesus	2003		Studio	oratorio

== Major opera house and festival debuts ==
Year	Opera house / Festival	Opera
1965	New York City Opera	Madama Butterfly
1966	Gran Teatre del Liceu	Carlota, Severino, La mulata de Córdoba
1967	Hamburg State Opera	Tosca
	Vienna State Opera	Don Carlo
1968	Metropolitan Opera	Adriana Lecouvreur
	Lyric Opera of Chicago	Manon Lescaut
1969	Verona Arena	Turandot
	San Francisco Opera	La bohème
	Teatro alla Scala	Ernani
1970	Teatro de la Zarzuela	La Gioconda
	Edinburgh Festival	Missa Solemnis
1971	Royal Opera House	Tosca
1972	Bavarian State Opera	La bohème
1973	Paris Opéra	Il trovatore
1975	Salzburg Festival	Don Carlo
1986	Los Angeles Opera	Otello
	Washington National Opera	Goya (Menotti)
1992	Bayreuth Festival	Parsifal

== See also ==
- Plácido Domingo discography
- The Three Tenors
- Christmas in Vienna I, II, III, and VI
- Grammy Award for Best Opera Recording
- Category:Plácido Domingo albums
