= Christmas in Vienna =

Christmas in Vienna may refer to:

- Christmas in Vienna (album), a 1993 album Diana Ross, Plácido Domingo and José Carreras
- Christmas in Vienna (film), a 1997 Croatian film directed by Branko Schmidt
- Christmas in Vienna (event), a music event held regularly in Vienna, Austria

== See also ==
- Christmas in Vienna II, the second album in the series
- Christmas in Vienna III, the third album in the series
- Christmas in Vienna VI, the seventh album in the series
