= A Gala Christmas in Vienna =

A Gala Christmas in Vienna / Christmas in Vienna V
- Directed by: Humphrey Burton
- Starring: Plácido Domingo; Sarah Brightman; Helmut Lotti; Riccardo Cocciante
- Distributed by: Sony Music Entertainment
- Release date: 24 November 1998
- Running time: 74 min.

A Gala Christmas in Vienna or Christmas in Vienna V is a DVD released in 1998. Plácido Domingo, Sarah Brightman, Helmut Lotti and Riccardo Cocciante perform traditional, European and American Christmas songs in Vienna, Austria. The orchestra was the Vienna Symphony, conducted by Steven Mercurio. The CD album of the concert reached No. 26 on the Austrian charts. It also charted in Germany, Belgium (in both Flanders and Wallonia), and the Netherlands.

== Cast ==
- Plácido Domingo – singer
- Sarah Brightman – singer
- Helmut Lotti – singer
- Riccardo Cocciante – singer
- Steven Mercurio – conductor
- Wiener Symphoniker
- Gumpoldskirchner Spatzen
- Marlies King

== Track listing ==
A CD of the songs was also released.

=== CD ===
1. "Christmas Prologue" (medley of traditional tunes)
2. "Deck the Halls"
3. "The Closing of the Year" (from the Toys film score)
4. "Tu scendi dalle stelle"
5. "Walking in the Air"
6. "Adeste Fideles" ("O Come, All Ye Faithful")
7. "Away in a Manger"
8. "An Old-Fashioned Christmas"
9. "First of May"
10. "Il Re Gesù" (by Plácido Domingo Jr.)
11. "Fröhliche Weihnacht überall"
12. "Cantemos Rapaces"
13. "Christmas Is Here Again" (by Roger Whittaker)
14. "Child in a Manger"
15. "Angels from the Realms of Glory"
16. "Another Christmas Song" (by Ian Anderson of Jethro Tull)
17. "Santa Claus Is Coming to Town"
18. "Happy Christmas (War is Over)"
19. "Silent Night" (in 5 languages)
20. "First of May" (Studio version) – (Bonus track)

== Reception ==
Entertainment Weekly gave the video a C+, writing that "as long as gorgeous-voiced stars like Placido Domingo and Sarah Brightman stick to traditional fare like Deck the Halls and European carols, all is bright", and cautioned "but when Domingo bellows over Trevor Horn's bombastic The Closing of the Year, and Brightman attempts to rock on Santa Claus Is Coming to Town, they're just schlockin' around the Christmas tree."

== CD chart performance ==
Chart	Peak position
Austria	26
Belgium (Flanders)	42
Belgium (Wallonia)	27
Germany	33
Netherlands	56

== See also ==
- Christmas in Vienna
- Christmas in Vienna II
- Christmas in Vienna III
- Christmas in Vienna VI
