= Plácido Domingo discography =

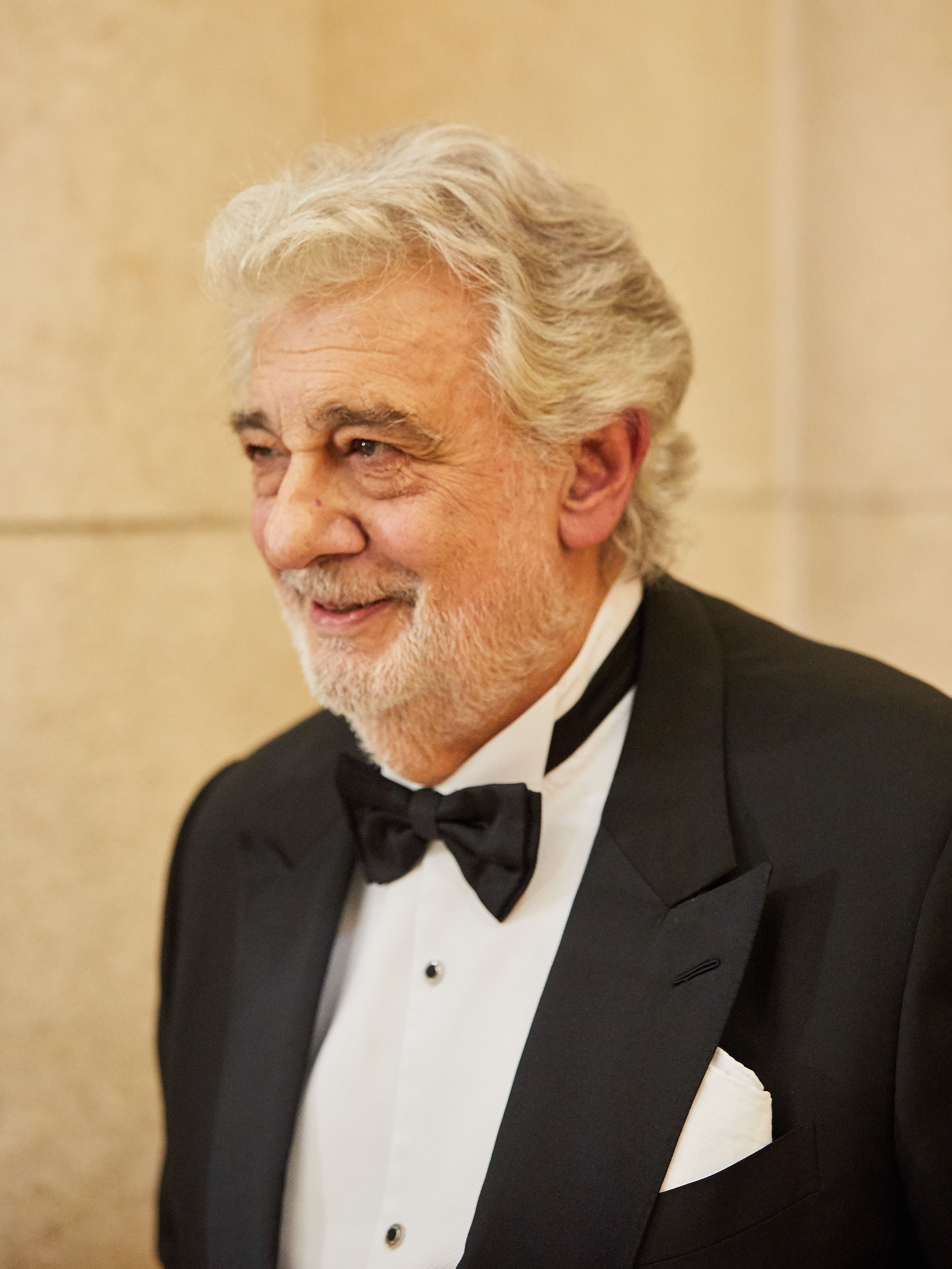
- Studio albums: 65
- Soundtrack albums: 3
- Live albums: 39
- Compilation albums: 101
- Singles: 23
- Role recordings (studio): 119
- Role recordings (live): 66
- Filmed stage roles: 51

Plácido Domingo has made hundreds of opera performances, music albums, and concert recordings throughout his career as an operatic tenor. From his first operatic leading role as Alfredo in La traviata in 1961, his major debuts continued in swift succession: Tosca at the Hamburg State Opera and Don Carlos at the Vienna State Opera in 1967; Adriana Lecouvreur at the Metropolitan Opera, Turandot in Verona Arena and La bohème in San Francisco in 1969; La Gioconda in 1970; Tosca at the Royal Opera House, London, in 1971; La bohème at the Bavarian State Opera in 1972; Il trovatore at the Paris Opéra in 1973 and Don Carlo at the Salzburg Festival in 1975, Parsifal in 1992 at the Bayreuth Festival; the same role is often recorded more than once.

Other than full-length opera performance recordings, Domingo has also made many music albums, recording opera arias, live opera performances and concerts, and crossover songs in solo and duet. His albums have simultaneously appeared on Billboard charts of best-selling classical and crossover recordings; contributing to many gold and platinum records and nine Grammy Awards.

Below are the lists of his recordings in full-length opera performances, music albums and compilation albums (including concerts) with other singers. However, the lists cannot be used to reflect his total number of performances because some of his operas and concerts have never been recorded.

== Albums ==
=== Studio albums ===
Year	Album	Conductor, ensemble	Awards	Certifications	Label
1958	Pepita Embil	Luis Mendoza López			RCA Victor; Cat: MKL-1144
1968	Recital of Italian Operatic Arias	Nello Santi; Deutsche Oper Berlin Orchestra	Grand Prix du Disque		Teldec; Cat: 73741
1969	Romantic Arias	Edward Downes; Royal Philharmonic Orchestra			RCA Red Seal; Cat: LSC-3083
1971	Great Operatic Duets: Domingo & Milnes	Anton Guadagno; London Symphony Orchestra			RCA Red Seal; Cat: LSC-3182
1972	Domingo Sings Caruso	Various conductors and ensembles			RCA Red Seal; Cat: LSC-3251
1973	La Voce d'Oro	Nello Santi; New Philharmonia Orchestra	Grammy nomination		RCA Red Seal; Cat: ARL1-0048
	Great Love Duets (with Katia Ricciarelli)	Gianandrea Gavazzeni; Orchestra dell'Accademia di Santa Cecilia			RCA Red Seal; Cat: ARL1-2799
1973	Domingo Conducts Milnes / Milnes Conducts Domingo	Plácido Domingo, Sherrill Milnes; New Philharmonia Orchestra			RCA Red Seal; Cat: ARL1-0122
1974	Fiesta de la Zarzuela (with Teresa Berganza)	Luis Antonio García Navarro; Orquesta Sinfónica de Barcelona			Forlane; Cat: 10 903
1974	Verdi and Puccini Duets (with Leontyne Price)	Nello Santi; New Philharmonia Orchestra	Grammy nomination		RCA Red Seal; Cat: ARL1 0840
1976	Be My love	Studio recording musicians			EMI Classics; Cat: CDP 7 95468 2
1978	Romantic Opera Duets (with Renata Scotto)	Kurt Herbert Adler; National Philharmonic Orchestra			Columbia Masterworks; Cat: M 35135
1979	Plácidio Domingo and the Vienna Choir Boys	Helmuth Froschauer; Wiener Sängerknaben; Chorus Viennensis; Wiener Symphoniker			RCA Red Seal; Cat: ARL1-3835
1981	Plácido Domingo Sings Tangos	Roberto Pansera; Studio Orchester		Spain: Gold	Deutsche Grammophon; Cat: 2536 416
	Perhaps Love (with John Denver)	Lee Holdridge; CBS Recording Studio		US: Platinum; UK: Silver; CAN: 2× Platinum; BRA: Platinum	CBS Records MK 37243
	Plácido Domingo: Opern-Gala	Carlo Maria Giulini; Los Angeles Philharmonic; Roger Wagner Chorale			Deutsche Grammophon; LP 477 6613; CD 400030-2
	Christmas with Plácido Domingo	Lee Holdridge; Vienna Symphony Orchestra		CAN: Gold	Sony Classical; Cat: SK 37245
1982	Canciones Mexicanas			Spain: Gold	CBS
1982	Adoro	Antonio Fernandez; Studio recording musicians			CBS; Cat: 37284
1983	My Life for a Song	Lee Holdridge; Studio recording musicians	Grammy nomination		CBS; Cat: 7464-37799-2
1984	Siempre En Mi Corazon (Always in My Heart)	Lee Holdridge; Royal Philharmonic Orchestra	Grammy; Award		CBS/Sony; Cat: 38828; Sony Classical; Cat: 63199
	The Tales of Cri-Cri (with Mathieu & Emmanuel)	Studio recording musicians			LP: CBS Records; Cat: 4100 858
1985	Save Your Nights for Me (featuring Maureen McGovern)	Studio recording musicians			CBS; Cat: 39866
1986	Vienna, City of My Dreams	Julius Rudel; English Chamber Orchestra; Ambrosian Singers			EMI Classics; Cat: 5 75241 2
	A Night at the Opera / The Magic Flute (with Jean-Pierre Rampal)	Plácido Domingo; Royal Philharmonic Orchestra			Sony; Cat: 42100
	Canta Para México	Various conductors and ensembles			Deutsche Grammophon; Cat: 419 310-1
1988	Cantos Aztecas (Songs of the Aztecs)	Mexico City Philharmonic Orchestra			Aleph Records; Cat: 11
1989	The Unknown Puccini	RCA studio New York	Grammy nomination		CBS Masterworks; Cat: MK 44981
	Roman Heroes	Eugene Kohn; National Philharmonic Orchestra			Angel Records; Cat: 7 54053 2
1990	Romanzas de Zarzuelas	Manuel Moreno-Buendia; Madrid Symphony Orchestra; National Zarezuela Theater Chorus			EMI Angel; Cat: 0077774914826
	Soñadores de España (with Julio Iglesias)	Various conductors and ensembles			Sony International; Cat: 80254
	Be My Love: An Album of Love	Eugene Kohn; Studio recording musicians		UK: Gold	EMI; Cat: 95468
1991	Together (with Itzhak Perlman)	Jonathan Tunick; New York Studio Orchestra			EMI Angel; Cat: 54266
	The Broadway I Love (with Carly Simon & Rebecca Luker)	Eugene Kohn; London Symphony Orchestra		UK: Silver	Atlantic / WEA; Cat: 82350
	Mozart Arias (with Carol Vaness)	Eugene Kohn; Munich Radio Symphony Orchestra			EMI/Angel; Cat: 54329
1994	Domingo Sings and Conducts Tchaikovsky (with Ofra Harnoy)	Plácido Domingo, Randall Behr, The Philharmonia			EMI/Angel; Cat: 55018
	De Mi Alma Latina 1	Bebu Silvetti; The VVC Symphonic Orchestra	Grammy nomination	MEX: Gold	EMI Records; Cat: 7243 5 55263 2 8
1996	Berlioz: Symphonie fantastique; Rouget de Lisle: La Marseillaise	Daniel Barenboim; Chicago Symphony Orchestra			Elektra / WEA
	Bajo El Cielo Español	Bebu Silvetti; VVC Symphonic Orchestra			Sony Classical; Cat: SK 62625
1997	De Mi Alma Latina 2	Bebu Silvetti; The VVC Symphonic Orchestra			EMI Records; Cat: 0724355636928
	Opera Gala (with Swenson & Hampson)	Eugene Kohn, Philharmonia Orchestra and Chorus			EMI Classics; Cat: CDC55554 2 7
1998	Por Amor	Bebu Silvetti; The VVC Symphonic Orchestra		MEX: Gold	Warner Music; Cat: 3984-23794-2
	Repeat the Sounding Joy (with Glenn Close)	David T. Clydesdale; The London Symphony Orchestra; The Ambrosian Singers			Hallmark; Cat: 695XPR9729
	Opera Arias (with Leontina Vaduva)	Plácido Domingo; Philharmonia Orchestra			EMI Classics; Cat: 56584
1999	Star Crossed Lovers (with Renée Fleming)	Daniel Barenboim; Chicago Symphont Orchestra			Decca; Cat: 460793
	100 Años de Mariachi (100 años de Mariachi)	Bebu Silvetti; Studio recording musicians	Grammy; Award	US (Latin): Platinum; MEX: Gold	EMI Classics; 0724355675521
2000	Wagner Love Duets (with Deborah Voigt)	Antonio Pappano; Royal Opera House Orchestra			EMI Classics; Cat: 0724355700421
2001	Domingo: Scenes from The Ring	Antonio Pappano; Royal Opera House Orchestra			EMI Classics; Cat: 5 57242 2
	The Verdi Tenor	Various conductors and ensembles			Deutsche Grammophon; Cat: 471 4782
	Verdi: The Tenor Arias	Various conductors and ensembles			Deutsche Grammophon; Cat: 471 335-2
2002	Quiereme Mucho	Bebu Silvetti; Miami Symphonic Strings			EMI Latin; Cat: 7 24355 72942 2
	Fire & Ice (with Sarah Chang)	Plácido Domingo; Berlin Philharmonic Orchestra			EMI Classics; Cat: 7243 5 57220 2 7
	Sacred Songs	Marcello Viotti; Verdi Grand Symphonic Orchestra; Verdi Chorus			Deutsche Grammophon; Cat: 471 5752
2006	Italia Ti Amo	Eugene Kohn, Budapest Philharmonic Orchestra			Deutsche Grammophon; Cat: 477 6086; Cat: 477 5565
2007	Gitano (with Rolando Villazón)	Plácido Domingo; Orquesta de la Comunidad de Madrid			Virgin Classics
2008	Pasión Española	Miguel Roa, Madrid Community Orchestra	Latin; Grammy; Award		Deutsche Grammophon; Cat: 477 6590
	Plácido Domingo: Amore Infinito (with Bocelli, Groban, Jenkins, Domingo Jr)	Nick Ingman; London Symphony Orchestra			Deutsche Grammophon; Cat: 477 8166
2012	Songs	Eugene Kohn; Abbey Road Studios; Avatar Studios			Sony Classical; Cat: 8876540393 2 Cat: 8869193493 2
2013	Verdi Baritone Arias	Pablo Heras-Casado; Orquestra de la Comunitat Valenciana; Cor de la Generalitat Valenciana	Latin; Grammy; Award		Sony Classical; Cat: 88837 33122

=== Live albums ===
==== Concerts and operatic selections ====
Year	Album	Conductor, ensemble	Awards	Certifications	Label
1979	Christmas with the Vienna Boys' Choir (with Hermann Prey)	Vienna Symphony; Vienna Chamber Orchestra			RCA Victor; Cat: 7930-2-RG
1984	Zarzuela Arias and Duets (with Pilar Lorengar)	Luis Antonio García Navarro; ORF-Symphonieorchester	Grammy nomination		CBS 39210
1986	Le Grandi Voci Plácido Domingo				Frequenz
1989	Domingo at the Philharmonic	Zubin Mehta; New York Philharmonic			Sony
	Live in Tokyo 1988 (with Kathleen Battle)	James Levine; Metropolitan Opera Orchestra	Grammy nomination		Deutsche Grammophon; 445552
	Live Recordings				Delta
	Ave Maria	Vienna Symphony; The Vienna Choir Boys			RCA Victor; Cat: 53835-2
1991	Por Fin Juntos (with Paloma San Basilio)				EMI
	Noche de Zarzuela	Enrique García Asenso; Orquesta Sinfonica de Madrid; Concierto Gala de Reyes, Auditorio Nacional de Música			RTVE/RNE
1992	Domingo: Live from Miami				Allegro Corporation
	The Domingo Songbook	Various conductors ensembles			Sony
	Barcelona Games (with Caballé, Carreras, et al.)				RCA Victor Red Seal
1992	Gala Lirica (with Caballé, Carreras, et al.)				RCA Victor Red Seal
1993	Christmas in Vienna (with Diana Ross & Carreras)	Vienna Symphony; Gumpoldskirchner Boys Choir	Echo; Klassik; Award	AUT: Platinum; CHE: Gold	Sony Classical; Cat: 53358
1994	Celebration in Vienna (with Dionne Warwick, Carreras, et al.)	Vjekoslav Šutej; Vienna Symphony, Vienna Children's Choir			Sony Classical; Cat: 62696
	Vienna Noël (with Sissel Kyrkjebø & Aznavour)	Vjekoslav Šutej, Vienna Symphony, Vienna Children's Choir			Sony Classical; Cat: 684626
1995	Italian Delights				Prime Cuts
	Battle & Domingo Live				Deutsche Grammophon
1996	Merry Christmas From Vienna (with Ying Huang & Michael Bolton)	Steven Mercurio; Vienna Symphony; Gumpoldskirchner Boys Choir			Sony Classical; Cat: 711325
	A Celebration of Christmas (with Natalie Cole & Carreras)				Erato; Cat: 0630-16204-2
1997	The Gold & Silver Gala				Angel Records
1998	Christmastime in Vienna (with Fernández & Kaas)	Steven Mercurio; Vienna Symphony Orchestra; Vienna Children's Choir			Sony Classical
	A Gala Christmas in Vienna (with Brightman, Cocciante & Lotti)	Paul Bateman; Steven Mercurio; Vienna Symphony; Gumpoldskirchner Boys Choir			Sony Classical; Cat: 60396 (CD); Cat: 60759 (DVD)
	Gala au Metropolitan Opera de New York (with Montserrat Caballé, et al.)	James Levine; Metropolitan Opera Orchestra			Deutsche Grammophon; Cat: 459 201-2
1999	Live in America				Hallmark (Empire)
	Plácido Domingo in Concert: Live in Seoul				Koch Records
2000	Recitals: Plácido Domingo Vol 2, Arias & Scenes				Opera D'oro
	Noches en los jardines de España / El sombrero de tres picos	Plácido Domingo; Daniel Barenboim; Chicago Symphony Orchestra			Teldec; Cat: 0630 17145 2
2001	Recitals: Plácido Domingo Sings; Arias & Scenes				Opera D'oro
	Our Favorite Things (with Bennett, Church & Williams)	Vienna Symphony			Sony Classical; Cat: 89468
2008	Plácido Domingo: Recital & duet recordings 1969–1989				Sony; Cat: 7316222
2011	Anna Netrebko: Live at The Met	Plácido Domingo, et al. Metropolitan Opera Orchestra			Deutsche Grammophon
2014	Domingo at The Met	Various (Live)			Masterworks
	Plácido Domingo's Operalia 2013	Plácido Domingo			Sony Classical
	Christmas in Moscow (with Carreras & Kyrkjebø)	David Giménez; Russian National Orchestra			Sony Classical

=== Compilation albums ===
This section contains a partial list of compilation albums with Domingo. It includes solely re-released material, unless otherwise noted. Previously unreleased selections from live performances are included under Live recordings: Concerts and operatic selections above.

==== Solo albums and collaborations ====
Year	Album	Cast	Conductor, ensemble	Certifications	Label	
1977	Romance: Musik für große Gefühle				Sony Music	
1981	Domingo!		Various conductors and ensembles		Sony Classics; Cat: 37207; CBS Records; Cat: 5 099707 402229	
1982	Con Amore	Plácido Domingo			RCA Red Seal; Cat: 84265	
1983	Magic Is The Moonlight		London Symphony Orchestra		Delta; Cat: 231318	
	Canta Para Todos				EMI Latin	
1985	Greatest Love Songs				CBS Records; Cat: 42520	
	Great Love Scenes	Plácido Domingo; Kiri Te Kanawa; Ileana Cotrubaș; Renata Scotto			CBS Masterworks MK 39030	
1987	The Plácido Domingo Collection		Various conductors and ensembles	UK: Gold	Stylus	
1989	Opera Arias	Plácido Domingo; Marilyn Horne; Ruggero Raimondi et al.			RCA Victor Red Seal	
	Entre Dos Mundos		Lee Holdridge; Royal Philharmonic Orchestra		Sony; 48479	
	The Essential Domingo: Popular Songs & Arias		Various conductors and ensembles	UK: Gold	Deutsche Grammophon	
1990	Plácido Domingo, Vol. 2				Delta	
	The Best of Plácido Domingo		Various conductors and ensembles		Deutsche Grammophon	
	Greatest Hits				RCA Victor	
	A Love until the End of Time	Plácido Domingo; Maureen McGovern	Leonard Bernstein; Lee Holdridge; Royal Philharmonic Orchestra		Sony	
	Die schönste Stimme			GER: Gold	Polystar	
1991	The Best of Beethoven	Plácido Domingo; Sherrill Milnes; Josephine Veasey et al.			RCA Victor	
	Best of Domingo, Te Kanawa & Pavarotti	Plácido Domingo; Kiri Te Kanawa; Luciano Pavarotti	Various conductors and ensembles	UK: Gold; AUS: Gold		
1992	Arias Songs & Tangos				Deutsche Grammophon; Cat: 435 916	
	Domingo			UK: Silver	Deutsche Grammophon	
	Granada: The Greatest Hits of Plácido Domingo				Deutsche Grammophon; Cat: 445 777	
	The Plácido Domingo Album				RCA Victor Red Seal	
	French Arias 2				Polygram Records	
1993	Bravissimo, Domingo! Vol. 1: Arias & Duets				RCA Victor Red Seal	
	Plácido Domingo, Vol. I				SUITE	
	Mad About Puccini the Greatest; Stars the Greatest Music	Plácido Domingo; Mirella Freni; José Carreras et al.			Deutsche Grammophon	
	The Women in My Life: A Passionate; Serenade to Opera's Leading Ladies				Polygram Records	
1994	A Night at the Opera: A Mozart Gala	Plácido Domingo; Ruggero Raimondi; Ezio Pinza et al.			Sony Classics	
	Domingo Favourites		Various conductors and ensembles		Deutsche Grammophon; Cat: 445 5252	
	The Magic Collection				ARC	
	Legendary Tenors: Plácido Domingo				Eclipse Music Group	
	All Star Tenors Salute the World	Plácido Domingo; José Carreras; Luciano Pavarotti et al.	Various conductors and ensembles		Sony Classical; Cat: 64394	
1995	De Coleccion				Universal Latino	
	The Great Plácido Domingo				Madacy Entertainment	
	The Golden Voice of Plácido Domingo				Madacy Entertainment	
	The Solo Collection				Slam	
	10 Tenors in Love	Plácido Domingo; Luciano Pavarotti; Mario Lanza et al.			RCA Victor	
	Domingo Opera Duets with Milnes & Ricciarelli				RCA Victor Gold Seal	
1996	Coleccion Mi Historia				Polygram Records	
	Pure Domingo				Angel Records/EMI; Cat: 55616	
	Verdi Heroes					RCA Victor Gold Seal
	Favorite Arias				Delta	
	Opera Assist: Help Rebuild Venice's; La Fenice Opera House	Plácido Domingo; Maria Callas; Luciano Pavarotti et al.			Capitol	
	Legendary Tenors	Enrico Caruso; José Carreras; Luciano Pavarotti; Plácido Domingo			Eclipse Music Group	
	Beethoven In Hollywood	Plácido Domingo; Sherrill Milnes; Josephine Veasey et al.			RCA Victor	
	The 14 Greatest Tenors	José Carreras; Plácido Domingo; Luciano Pavarotti			Gala	
	Love Songs + Tangos			GER: Gold	Karussell	
1997	Tears From Heaven	Plácido Domingo; Kathleen Battle; Montserrat Caballé et al.	Various conductors and ensembles		RCA Victor Red Seal; Cat: 68606	
	The Domingo Collection				Sony; 63027	
	Sleighride! Classic Christmas Favorites	Plácido Domingo; Johannes Sonnleitner et al.	Various conductors and ensembles		RCA Victor Red Seal; Cat: 61373	
1998	Bravo Domingo		Various conductors and ensembles		Deutsche Grammophon; Cat: 459352	
	Opera Favorites				Castle Pulse/Wave	
	Meisterstücke				Deutsche Grammophon	
	Great – Plácido Domingo				Goldies Records	
	Passionate Arias				Bci Eclipse Company	
	Classic Hit Parade Una furtiva lagrima				Universal/Eloquence	
	Amore – Opera's Greatest Romances	Jussi Björling; Plácido Domingo; Montserrat Caballé	Various conductors and ensembles		RCA Victor Red Seal; Cat: 63299	
1999	The Young Domingo		Various conductors and ensembles		RCA Victor Red Seal; Cat: 0 9026-63527-2 2	
	A Tribute to Operetta: A Franz Lehár Gala	José Carreras; Plácido Domingo; Thomas Hampson et al.			Polygram Records	
	Highlights from Faust (Gounod); Otello (Verdi) & La bohème (Puccini)	Dame Kiri Te Kanawa; Plácido Domingo; Piero Cappuccilli	Sir Charles Mackerras; Nello Santi; Paris Opera Orchestra and Chorus; ROH Orchestra and Chorus		Bella Voce Records	
2000	Canciones de Amor: Songs of Love		Various conductors and ensembles		EMI Classics; Cat: 0724355704528	
	Ô Paradis: The Great Voice of Plácido Domingo				Polygram Records	
	Super Hits: Plácido Domingo				Sony	
	Verdi / Puccini: Arias				Universal Music & VI	
	Stella Sings	Luciano Pavarotti; Plácido Domingo; Connie Francis et al.			Universal music	
	Berlioz: La Marseillaise; Symphonie fantastique; Ravel: Boléro; Rapsodie espagnole; etc.	Plácido Domingo et al.			Teldec	
2001	Great Italian Operas Arias				Prism Records	
	Classic Tenor Arias				Remark Records/Exworks	
	Escape Through Opera	Plácido Domingo; Renata Scotto; Dame Kiri Te Kanawa et al.			Sony	
	The #1 Christmas Album	Plácido Domingo; Luciano Pavarotti; Leontyne Price et al.	Various conductors and ensembles		Decca; Cat: 470022	
2002	Plácido Domingo Sings				D Classics	
	Opera's Best Ballads	José Carreras; Luciano Pavarotti; Plácido Domingo et al.			Columbia River Ent.	
	Romantic Arias	José Carreras; Luciano Pavarotti; Plácido Domingo et al.			Columbia River Ent.	
2003	The very Best of Plácido Domingo		Various conductors and ensembles		EMI Classics; Cat: 7 24357 59062 4	
	Bravo Domingo: lo major de Plácido Domingo		Various conductors and ensembles		EMI Latin; Cat: 7243 5 57596 2 7 Cat: 7243 5 57595 2 8	
2004	Bizet: Greatest Hits	Plácido Domingo; Rene Bianco; Sherrill Milnes et al.			Decca	
	The Essential Plácido Domingo		Various conductors and ensembles		Sony Legacy; Cat: 4 893391 120220	
	The Best of Plácido Domingo: The Millennium Collection		Various conductors and ensembles		Universal Classic; Cat: 0 0035 400 2	
	Artist Portrait: Plácido Domingo		Various conductors and ensembles		Warner Classics; Cat: 09274 97072	
2005	Legends of Opera: Plácido Domingo		Various conductors and ensembles		PerforMAX	
	Verdi: Arias & Duets		Various conductors and ensembles		EMI Classics; Cat: 62978	
	Introducing Plácido Domingo				RCA Victor/BMG	
2006	Moments of Passion		Various conductors and ensembles		Sony BMG; Cat: 8 28768 77052	
	Truly Domingo		Various conductors and ensembles		Deutsche Grammophon; Cat: 477 6292	
2007	Plácido Domingo: Aria Collection		Various conductors and ensembles		Qualiton/Orfeo	
2015	Domingo – The 50 Greatest Tracks		Various conductors and ensembles		Deutsche Grammophon	
2016	The Best of Plácido Domingo		Various conductors and ensembles		Sony	

== Recordings of complete roles ==
This section includes recordings of Domingo performing complete roles in operas, zarzuelas, musicals, and vocal symphonic works.

=== Studio recordings ===
Year	Composer: Title	Cast	Conductor, ensemble	Awards	Certifications	Label
1959	Loewe: Mi bella dama (My Fair Lady)	Manolo Fábregas; Cristina Rojas; Plácido Domingo	M. Ruiz Armengol			Columbia; Cat: 2980; Cat: DCA-85; Cat: WL 155
1960	Hague: La Pelirroja (Redhead) ("Two Faces in the Dark")	Armando Calvo; Virma González; Manuel "Loco" Valdés; Plácido Domingo				RCA; Cat: MKL-1270
1969	Beethoven: Symphony No. 9 Choral	Plácido Domingo; Sherrill Milnes; Josephine Veasey; Jane Marsh	Erich Leinsdorf; Boston Symphony Orchestra; New England Conservatory chorus			RCA
	Verdi: Il trovatore	Plácido Domingo; Sherrill Milnes; Leontyne Price et al.	Zubin Mehta; New Philharmonia Orchestra; Ambrosian chorus	Grammy nomination		RCA; Cat: 6194-2; Cat: 86194
1970	Puccini: Il tabarro	Plácido Domingo; Leontyne Price; Sherill Milnes et al.	Erich Leinsdorf; New Philharmonia Orchestra; John Alldis Choir	Grammy nomination		RCA; Cat: 60865-2
	Weber: Oberon	Plácido Domingo; Birgit Nilsson; Arleen Auger et al.	Rafael Kubelík (Studio); Bavarian Radio Symphony Orchestra & chorus			Deutsche Grammophon; Cat: 477 5644; Cat: 419 038-2
	Verdi: Aida	Leontyne Price; Plácido Domingo; Grace Bumbry et al.	Erich Leinsdorf (Studio); London Symphony Orchestra; The John Aldius Choir	Grammy; Award		RCA Red Seal; Cat: LSC-6198; RCA; Cat: 86198
	Verdi: Don Carlo	Plácido Domingo; Montserrat Caballé; Sherill Milnes et al.	Carlo Maria Giulini; Royal Opera House Orchestra; Ambrosian chorus	Grammy nomination		EMI Classics; Cat: 47701-8; Angel Records; Cat: 47701
	Verdi: Messa da Requiem	Plácido Domingo; Ruggero Raimondi; Martina Arroyo; Josephine Veasey	Leonard Bernstein; London Symphony Orchestra & Chorus			Sony; Cat: 5160282
1971	Leoncavallo: Pagliacci	Plácido Domingo; Montserrat Caballé; Sherill Milnes et al.	Nello Santi; London Symphony Orchestra; John Alldis Choir			RCA; Cat: 60865-2
	Offenbach: Les contes d'Hoffmann	Plácido Domingo; Dame Joan Sutherland; Gabriel Bacquier et al.	Richard Bonynge (Studio); Orchestre et chorus de la Suisse Romande	Grand Prix du Disque		Decca; Cat: 417 363-2
	Verdi: I Lombardi alla prima crociata	Plácido Domingo; Cristina Deutekom; Ruggiero Raimondi et al.	Lamberto Gardelli; Royal Opera House Orchestra; Ambrosian Singers			Philips; Cat: 422 420-2
	Puccini: Manon Lescaut	Montserrat Caballé; Plácido Domingo; Vicente Sardinero et al.	Bruno Bartoletti (Studio); New Philharmonia Orchestra; Ambrosian Opera chorus			EMI Classic; Cat: 7 47736-8
	Richard Strauss: Der; Rosenkavalier	Plácido Domingo; Christa Ludwig; Lucia Popp; Walter Berry	Leonard Bernstein; Vienna Philharmonic Orchestra	Grammy nomination		Sony; Cat: 42564
1972	Bellini: Norma	Plácido Domingo; Montserrat Caballé; Fiorenza Cossotto et al.	Carlo Felice Cillario; London Symphony Orchestra; Ambrosian Singers			RCA; Cat: 6502-2; Cat: 8650
	Puccini: Tosca	Plácido Domingo; Leontyne Price; Sherrill Milnes et al.	Zubin Mehta; New Philharmonia Orchestra; John Alldis Choir			RCA; Cat: DCD2-0105; Cat: RD 80105
	Verdi: Giovanna d'Arco	Montserrat Caballé; Plácido Domingo; Sherrill Milnes et al.	James Levine; London Symphony Orchestra; Ambrosian Opera chorus			EMI Classics; Cat: 63226-2; Angel Records; Cat: 63226
	Serrano: La dolorosa	Plácido Domingo; Teresa Berganza; Ramón Contreras; Juan Pons	Luis Antonio García Navarro; Orquestra Sinfónica de Barcelona			Alhambra; Cat: WD 71588
	Serrano: Los Claveles	Plácido Domingo; Teresa Berganza; Dolores Cava	Luis Antonio García Navarro; Orquestra Sinfónica de Barcelona			Alhambra; Cat: WD 71588
1973	Boito: Mefistofele	Plácido Domingo; Norman Treigle; Montserrat Caballé et al.	Julius Rudel (Studio); London Symphony Orchestra; Ambrosian Singers			Angel; Cat: 49522; EMI; Cat: 49522-2
	Puccini: La bohème	Plácido Domingo; Montserrat Caballé; Sherrill Milnes et al.	Sir Georg Solti; London Philharmonic Orchestra; John Alldis Choir	Grammy; Award		RCA; Cat: RCD2-0371
	Verdi: I vespri Siciliani	Plácido Domingo; Martina Arroyo; Ruggiero Raimondi et al.	James Levine; New Philharmonia Orchestra; John Alldis Choir	Grammy nomination		RCA; Cat: 80-370
	Verdi: Simon Boccanegra	Plácido Domingo; Piero Cappuccilli; Katia Ricciarelli; Ruggero Raimondi	Gianandrea Gavazzeni; RCA Orchestra & chorus			RCA; Cat: 70729
1974	Verdi: Aida	Plácido Domingo; Montserrat Caballé; Fiorenza Cossotto et al.	Riccardo Muti; New Philharmonia Orchestra; Royal Opera House chorus			EMI Classics; Cat: 47271-8; Angel Records; Cat: 47271
1975	Bizet: Carmen	Tatiana Troyanos; Plácido Domingo; Dame Kiri Te Kanawa; José Van Dam	Sir Georg Solti; London Philharmonic Orchestra	2 Grammy nominations Grand Prix du Disque		Decca; Cat: 414 489-2
1976	Wagner: Die Meistersinger von Nürnberg	Plácido Domingo; Dietrich Fischer-Dieskau; Catarina Ligendza et al.	Eugen Jochum; Berlin State Opera Orchestra & chorus	Grammy nomination		Deutsche Grammophon; Cat: 415 278-2
	Verdi: Un ballo in maschera	Plácido Domingo; Martina Arroyo; Fiorenza Cossotto et al.	Riccardo Muti (Studio); New Philharmonia Orchestra; Royal Opera House chorus			Angel Records; Cat: 69576; EMI Classics; Cat: 69576-2
	Massenet: La Navarraise	Plácido Domingo; Sherrill Milnes; Marilyn Horne et al.	Henry Lewis; London Symphony Orchestra; Ambrosian Opera chorus			RCA Victor; Cat: 50167
	Montemezzi: L'amore dei tre re	Plácido Domingo; Pablo Elvira; Anna Moffo et al.	Nello Santi; London Symphony Orchestra; Ambrosian Opera chorus			RCA; Cat: 50166
	Giordano: Andrea Chénier	Plácido Domingo; Renata Scotto; Sherrill Milnes et al.	James Levine; National Philharmonic Orchestra; John Alldis chorus			RCA; Cat: 2046-2; Cat: 82046
	G. Charpentier: Louise	Ileana Cotrubaş; Plácido Domingo; Gabriel Bacquier et al.	Georges Prêtre; New Philharmonia Orchestra; Ambrosian Singers			Sony Classical; Cat: 46429
	Puccini: Il trittico (Il tabarro / Gianni Schicchi)	Plácido Domingo; Renata Scotto; Ileana Cotrubaş et al.	Lorin Maazel; London Symphony Orchestra; Ambrosian Opera chorus			CBS; Cat: 35912; Cat: 79312
	Verdi: Macbeth	Plácido Domingo; Shirley Verrett; Piero Cappuccilli et al.	Claudio Abbado; Teatro alla Scala Orchestra & chorus	Grammy nomination		Deutsche Grammophon; Cat: 415 688-2
	Verdi: La forza del destino	Plácido Domingo; Sherrill Milnes; Leontyne Price et al.	James Levine (Studio); London Symphony Orchestra; John Alldis Choir			RCA Victor Red Seal; Cat: 39502
	Verdi: La traviata	Plácido Domingo; Ileana Cotrubaş; Sherrill Milnes et al.	Carlos Kleiber (Studio); Bavarian State Orchestra & chorus	Grammy nomination		Deutsche Grammophon; Cat: 415 132-2
1977	Donizetti: L'elisir d'amore	Plácido Domingo; Ileana Cotrubaş; Ingvar Wixell et al.	Sir John Pritchard; Royal Opera House Orchestra & chorus			CBS; Cat: 34585; Cat: 79.210
	Cilea: Adriana Lecouvreur	Plácido Domingo; Renata Scotto; Sherrill Milnes et al.	James Levine (Studio); Philharmonia Orchestra; Ambrosian Singers			Sony Classical; Cat: 34588; CBS; Cat: 79310
	Verdi: Otello	Plácido Domingo; Renata Scotto; Sherrill Milnes et al.	James Levine; National Philharmonic Orchestra; Ambrosian singers	Grammy nomination		RCA; Cat: 2951; Cat: 82951-2
	Puccini: La fanciulla del West	Plácido Domingo; Carol Neblett; Sherrill Milnes et al.	Zubin Mehta (Studio); Royal Opera House Orchestra & chorus	Grammy nomination		Deutsche Grammophon; Cat: 474 8402; Cat: 419 640-2
	Bizet: Carmen	Teresa Berganza; Plácido Domingo; Ileana Cotrubaş et al.	Claudio Abbado; London Symphony Orchestra; Ambrosian Singers			Deutsche Grammophon; Cat: 427 885-2
1978	Saint-Saëns: Samson et Dalila	Plácido Domingo; Elena Obraztsova; Renato Bruson et al.	Daniel Barenboïm (Studio); Orchestre de Paris et chorus			Deutsche Grammophon; Cat: 477 560-2; Cat: 413 297-2
	Mascagni: Cavalleria rusticana	Plácido Domingo; Pablo Elvira; Renata Scotto et al.	James Levine (Studio); National Philharmonic Orchestra; Ambrosian Opera chorus			RCA; Cat: 83091; BMG Classics; Cat: 74321 39500 2 Brilliant Classics; Cat: 6251
	Gounod: Faust	Plácido Domingo; Mirella Freni; Nicolai Ghiaurov et al.	Georges Prêtre (Studio); Paris Opera Orchestra & chorus			Angel; Cat: 47493; EMI; Cat: 7 47493-8
	Puccini: Madama Butterfly	Plácido Domingo; Renata Scotto; Ingvar Wixell et al.	Lorin Maazel (Studio); London Philharmonia Orchestra; Ambrosian Opera chorus			CBS; Cat: 35181; Sony; Cat: 91135
	Berlioz: La damnation de Faust	Plácido Domingo; Yvonne Minton; Dietrich Fischer-Dieskau; Jules Bastin	Daniel Barenboim; Paris Opera Orchestra & chorus			Deutsche Grammophon; Cat: 474 440 2
1979	Verdi: Rigoletto	Plácido Domingo; Piero Cappucilli; Ileana Cotrubaş et al.	Carlo Maria Giulini; Vienna State Opera Orchestra & chorus			Deutsche Grammophon; Cat: 415 288-2; Cat: 414 269-2
	Berlioz: Béatrice et Bénédict	Yvonne Minton; Plácido Domingo; Ileana Cotrubaş et al.	Daniel Barenboim; Orchestre de Paris; Orchestre de Paris chorus			Deutsche Grammophon; 449 577-2
	Berlioz: Requiem	Plácido Domingo	Daniel Barenboim; Paris Opera Orchestra & chorus			Deutsche Grammophon; 437 638
	Massenet: Werther	Plácido Domingo; Elena Obraztsova; Arleen Augér et al.	Riccardo Chailly (Studio); Cologne Children's Choir; Cologne Radio Symphony Orchestra			Deutsche Grammophon; Cat: 477 5652; Cat: 413 304-2
	Puccini: Le villi	Plácido Domingo; Renata Scotto; Leo Nucci et al.	Lorin Maazel; National Philharmonic Orchestra; Ambrosian Opera chorus	Grammy nomination		CBS; Cat: 36669; Cat: 76890
	Verdi: Luisa Miller	Plácido Domingo; Katia Ricciarelli; Renato Bruson et al.	Lorin Maazel; Royal Opera House Orchestra & chorus			Deutsche Grammophon; Cat: 423 144-2
1980	Puccini: Tosca	Plácido Domingo; Renato Bruson; Renata Scotto et al.	James Levine (Studio); Philharmonia Orchestra; Ambrosian Opera chorus	Grammy nomination		Angel; Cat: 49364; EMI; Cat: 49364-2
	Beethoven: Symphony No. 9	Plácido Domingo; Jessye Norman; Brigitte Fassbaender; Walter Berry	Karl Böhm; Vienna Philharmonic; Vienna State Opera			Polygram Records
	Verdi: Un ballo in maschera	Plácido Domingo; Katia Ricciarelli; Renato Bruson et al.	Claudio Abbado; Teatro alla Scala Orchestra & chorus			Deutsche Grammophon; Cat: 415 685-2
	Verdi: Requiem	Plácido Domingo; Katia Ricciarelli; Shirley Verrett; Nicolai Ghiaurov	Claudio Abbado; Teatro alla Scala Orchestra & chorus			Deutsche Grammophon; Cat: 415 976-2 GH2
1981	Verdi: Aida	Plácido Domingo; Katia Ricciarelli; Yelena Obraztsova et al.	Claudio Abbado (Studio); Teatro alla Scala Orchestra & chorus	Grammy nomination		Deutsche Grammophon; Cat: 477 5605; Cat: 4100922
	Puccini: Le villi	Plácido Domingo; Renata Scotto; Leo Nucci et al.	Lorin Maazel (Studio); National Philharmonic Orchestra; Ambrosian Opera chorus			Sony Classical
	Puccini: Turandot	Plácido Domingo; Katia Ricciarelli; Barbara Hendricks et al.	Herbert von Karajan; Vienna Philharmonic Orchestra; Vienna State Opera chorus Vienna Boys' Choir	Grammy nomination		Deutsche Grammophon; Cat: 423 855-2; Cat: 410 096-2
1982	Verdi: Ernani	Mirella Freni; Plácido Domingo; Renato Bruson et al.	Riccardo Muti (Studio); Teatro alla Scala Orchestra & chorus	Grammy nomination		Angel Records; Cat: CDC-47082; EMI; Cat: 47083-2
	Mascagni: Cavalleria rusticana	Plácido Domingo; Elena Obraztsova; Renato Bruson et al.	Georges Prêtre; Teatro alla Scala Orchestra & chorus			Philips; Cat: 416 137-2; Cat: 442 482-2; Cat: 454 265-2
	Leoncavallo: Pagliacci	Plácido Domingo; Teresa Stratas; Juan Pons et al.	Georges Prêtre; Teatro alla Scala Orchestra & chorus	Grammy nomination		Philips; Cat: 411 484-2
	Bizet: Carmen	Julia Migenes; Plácido Domingo; Ruggiero Raimondi et al.	Lorin Maazel; Orchestre National de France; Children's chorus of Radio France	Grammy; Award	FRA: Platinum	Erato; Cat: 45207-2; Cat: 7473138
	Puccini: La rondine	Plácido Domingo; Dame Kiri Te Kanawa; Leo Nucci et al.	Lorin Maazel; London Symphony Orchestra; Ambrosian chorus			CBS; Cat: M2K-37852
	Verdi: Nabucco	Plácido Domingo; Piero Cappuccilli; Ghena Dimitrova et al.	Giuseppe Sinopoli; Deutsche Oper Berlin Orchestra & chorus			Deutsche Grammophon; Cat: 410 512-2
	Verdi: La traviata	Plácido Domingo; Teresa Stratas; Cornell MacNeill	James Levine; Metropolitan Opera Orchestra & chorus	Grammy; Award		Elektra; Cat: 60267
1983	Verdi: Don Carlos	Plácido Domingo; Katia Ricciarelli; Leo Nucci et al.	Claudio Abbado; Teatro all Scala Orchestra & chorus	Grammy nomination		Deutsche Grammophon; Cat: 415 316-2
	Verdi: Il trovatore	Plácido Domingo; Rosalind Plowright; Brigitte Fassbaender et al.	Carlo Maria Giulini (Studio); Santa Cecilia Academy Rome; Orchestra & chorus			Deutsche Grammophon; Cat: 423 858-2; Cat: 423 058-2
	Puccini: Manon Lescaut	Plácido Domingo; Mirella Freni; Renato Bruson et al.	Giuseppe Sinopoli (Studio); Royal Opera House Orchestra & chorus	Grammy nomination Grand Prix du Disque		Deutsche Grammophon; Cat: 477 6354; Cat: 413 893-2
1985	Verdi: Otello	Plácido Domingo; Katia Ricciarelli; Justino Diaz et al.	Lorin Maazel; Teatro alla Scala Orchestra & chorus	Grammy nomination		Angel Records; Cat: 47450; EMI Classics; Cat: 47450-8
1986	Wagner: Lohengrin	Plácido Domingo; Jessye Norman; Eva Randová et al.	Sir Georg Solti; Vienna Philharmonic Orchestra; Vienna State Opera chorus	Grammy; Award & nomination		Decca; Cat: 421 053-2
	Mascagni: Iris	Plácido Domingo; Ilona Tokody; Juan Pons et al.	Giuseppe Patanè (Studio); Münchner Rundfunkorchester; Chor des Bayerischen Rundfunks			Sony; Cat: 746 4455 2621; CBS; Cat: M2K-45526
	J.Strauss II: Die Fledermaus	Plácido Domingo; Lucia Popp; Peter Seiffert et al.	Plácido Domingo (Studio); Munich Radio Orchestra; Bavarian Radio chorus			Angel; Cat: 47480; EMI; Cat: 47480-8
1988	Verdi: La forza del destino	Mirella Freni; Plácido Domingo; Giorgio Zancanaro et al.	Riccardo Muti; Teatro alla Scala Orchestra & chorus			EMI Classics; Cat: 7 47485-8; Angel Records; Cat: 47485
	Boito: Mefistofele	Plácido Domingo; Samuel Ramey; Éva Marton et al.	Giuseppe Patanè; Hungarian State Symphony Orchestra; Hungaroton Opera chorus			Sony Classical; Cat: 44983
1989	Mascagni: Cavalleria rusticana	Agnes Baltsa; Plácido Domingo; Juan Pons et al.	Giuseppe Sinopoli (Studio); Philharmonia Orchestra; Royal Opera House chorus			Deutsche Grammophon; Cat: 429 568-2
	Wagner: Tannhäuser	Plácido Domingo; Cheryl Studer; Agnes Baltsa et al.	Giuseppe Sinopoli; Philharmonia Orchestra; Royal Opera House chorus			Deutsche Grammophon; Cat: 427 625-2
	Offenbach: Les contes d'Hoffmann	Plácido Domingo; Edita Gruberova; Gabriel Bacquier et al.	Seiji Ozawa; Orchestre National de France; Choeurs de Radio France			Deutsche Grammophon; Cat: 427 682-2; Cat: 429 788-2
	Verdi: Un ballo in maschera	Plácido Domingo; Dame Josephine Barstow; Leo Nucci; Sumi Jo et al.	Herbert von Karajan (Studio); Vienna Philharmonic Orchestra & chorus			Deutsche Grammophon; Cat: 427 635-2
	Verdi: Aida	Plácido Domingo; Dolora Zajick; Aprile Millo et al.	James Levine (Studio); Metropolitan Opera Orchestra & chorus			Sony Classical; Cat: 45973
	Yeston: Goya: A Life in Song	Plácido Domingo; Jennifer Rush; Dionne Warwick; Joseph Cerisano				CBS/Sony; Cat: 483294-2
1990	Donizetti: Lucia di Lammermoor	Plácido Domingo; Cheryl Studer; Juan Pons et al.	Ion Marin (Studio); London Symphony Orchestra; Ambrosian Opera chorus			Deutsche Grammophon; Cat: 459 4912; Cat: 435 309-2
	Puccini: Tosca	Plácido Domingo; Mirella Freni; Samuel Ramey et al.	Giuseppe Sinopoli; Royal Opera House Orchestra & chorus			Deutsche Grammophon; Cat: 431 775-2
	Verdi: Luisa Miller	Plácido Domingo; Aprile Millo; Paul Plishka et al.	James Levine; Metropolitan Opera Orchestra & chorus			Sony Classical; Cat: 48073; Sony; Cat: 40013
	Verdi: Il trovatore	Plácido Domingo; Aprile Millo; Dolora Zajick et al.	James Levine; Metropolitan Opera Orchestra & chorus			Sony; Cat: 48070
1991	Saint-Saëns: Samson et Dalila	Plácido Domingo; Waltraud Meier; Alain Fondary et al.	Myung-whun Chung; Bastille Opera Orchestra & chorus			EMI Classics; Cat: 54470; Cat: 54470-2
	Wagner: The Flying Dutchman	Plácido Domingo; Bernd Weikl; Cheryl Studer et al.	Giuseppe Sinopoli (Studio); Deutsche Oper Berlin Orchestra & chorus			Deutsche Grammophon; Cat: 437 7782
1992	Penella: El gato montés	Plácido Domingo; Verónica Villarroel; Juan Pons et al.	Miguel Roa; Madrid Symphony Orchestra; Escolania de Nuestra Señora del Recuerdo			Deutsche Grammophon; Cat: 435776
	Strauss: Die Frau ohne Schatten	Plácido Domingo; Hildegard Behrens; Julia Varady et al.	Georg Solti; Vienna Philharmonic Orchestra; Vienna Boys Choir	Grammy; Award & nomination Gramophone; Award		Decca; Cat: 436 243-2
	Rossini: Il barbiere di Siviglia	Kathleen Battle; Plácido Domingo; Frank Lopardo et al.	Claudio Abbado; Chamber Orchestra of Europe; Teatro La Fenice chorus			Deutsche Grammophon; Cat: 435 763-2
	Goya: Una vida hecha canción	Plácido Domingo; Gloria Estefan; Yuri; Yolandita Monge				Sony; Cat: CDT-80726
1993	Verdi: Otello	Plácido Domingo; Cheryl Studer; Sergei Leiferkus et al.	Myung-whun Chung; Opéra Bastille Orchestra & chorus			Deutsche Grammophon; Cat: 439 805-2
	Wagner: Parsifal	Plácido Domingo; Jessye Norman; Kurt Moll et al.	James Levine (Studio); Metropolitan Opera Orchestra & chorus			Deutsche Grammophon; Cat: 437 501-2
	Verdi: Requiem	Plácido Domingo; Waltraud Meier; Alessandra Marc; Ferruccio Furlanetto	Daniel Barenboim; Chicago Symphony Orchestra and chorus			Teldec; Cat: 82120
1994	Tomás Bretón: La Verbena de la Paloma	Plácido Domingo; Maria Bayo, Raquel Pierotti	Antoni Ros-Marbà; Orquestra Sinfónica de Madrid			Auvidis Valois; Cat: 4725
	Vives: Doña Francisquita	Plácido Domingo; Ainhoa Arteta, Carlos Álvarez, Linda Mirabal	Miguel Roa; Sinfonica de Sevilla			Sony; Cat: 66563
1995	Gounod: Roméo et Juliette	Plácido Domingo; Ruth Ann Swenson; Susan Graham et al.	Leonard Slatkin (Studio); Munich Radio Symphony Orchestra; Bavarian Radio chorus			RCA Victor; Cat: 09026-68440-2
	Mozart: Idomeneo	Plácido Domingo; Cecilia Bartoli; Carol Vaness et al.	James Levine (Studio); Metropolitan Opera Orchestra & chorus			Deutsche Grammophon; Cat: 447-737-2
	Moreno Torroba: Luisa; Fernanda	Plácido Domingo; Veronica Villarroel; Juan Pons	Antoni Ros-Marbà; Orquestra Sinfónica de Madrid			Auvidis Valois; Cat: 4759
1996	Sorozábal: La Tabernera; Del Puerto	Plácido Domingo; Maria Bayo; Juan Pons et al.	Victor Pablo Perez; Galicia Symphony Orchestra; Orfeón Donostiarra			Valois; Cat: 4766
	Man of La Mancha	Plácido Domingo; Samuel Ramey; Julia Migenes et al.				Sony
	Bretón: La Dolores	Plácido Domingo; Elisabete Matos; Tito Beltran	Antoni Ros-Marbà; Orquestra Sinfónica de Barcelona	Latin; Grammy; Award		Decca; Cat: 466 060
1997	Cano: Luna	Plácido Domingo; Teresa Berganza; Renée Fleming; Ainhoa Arteta	Joan Albert Amargós; London Symphony Orchestra			
1998	Liszt: Faust Symphony	Plácido Domingo	Daniel Barenboim; Berlin Philharmonic			Teldec; Cat: 22048
1999	Beethoven: Fidelio	Plácido Domingo; Waltraud Meier; Falk Struckmann, et al.	Daniel Barenboim; Berlin State Opera Orchestra & chorus			Teldec; Cat: 25249
	Chapí: Margarita la tornera	Plácido Domingo; Elisabete Matos; María Rey-Joly et al.	Garcia Navarro (Studio); Madrid Symphony Orchestra; Madrid Symphony chorus	Latin; Grammy nomination		Rtve Classics; Cat: 65169
	Albéniz: Merlin	Plácido Domingo; Carlos Álvarez; Jane Henschel et al.	José De Eusebio; Madrid Symphony Orchestra; Spanish National chorus Madrid Comunidad Choru	Latin; Grammy; Award		Decca; Cat: 467096
2000	Bacalov: Misa Tango	Maria Ana Martinez; Héctor Ulises Passarella	Myung-whun Chung; Santa Cecilia Academy Orchestra	Latin; Grammy nomination		Deutsche Grammophon; Cat: 463 4712
	Mahler: Das Lied von der Erde	Plácido Domingo; Bo Skovhus	Esa-Pekka Salonen; Los Angeles Philharmonic			Sony
2002	Ponchielli: La Gioconda	Plácido Domingo; Violeta Urmana; Luciana D'Intino et al.	Marcello Viotti; Munich Radio Symphony Orchestra; Bavarian Radio chorus Munich Children's chorus			EMI Classics; Cat: 57451
	Chapí: La Revoltosa	Plácido Domingo; María Rodriguez; Eneida G. Garijo; Miguel Sola	Miguel Roa; Madrid Symphony Orchestra			RTVE Música; Cat: 65150
	Chueca & Valverde: La Gran Via	Plácido Domingo; Marta Moreno; Ricardo Muñiz, Milagros Martín	Miguel Roa; Madrid Symphony Orchestra			RTVE Música; Cat: 65150
2003	Beethoven: Christus am Ölberge	Plácido Domingo; Andreas Schmidt; Ľuba Orgonášová	Kent Nagano; Deutsches Symphonie-Orchester Berlin; Berlin Radio chorus			Harmonia Mundi; Cat: 801802
2005	Wagner: Tristan und Isolde	Plácido Domingo; Nina Stemme; Mihoko Fujimura et al.	Antonio Pappano; Royal Opera House Orchestra & chorus	Classic Brit; Award		EMI Classics; Cat: 580062
2006	Puccini: Edgar	Plácido Domingo; Adriana d'Amato; Juan Pons et al.	Alberto Veronesi (Studio); Santa Cecilia Academy Rome; Orchestra & chorus			Deutsche Grammophon; Cat: 477 6102
	Albéniz: Pepita Jiménez	Plácido Domingo; Carol Vaness; Jane Henschel et al.	Jose De Eusebio (Studio); Madrid Community Orchestra & chorus			Deutsche Grammophon; Cat: 477 6234
2010	Leoncavallo: La Nuit De Mai	Plácido Domingo; Lang Lang	Alberto Veronesi; Orchestra del Teatro Comunale di Bologna			Deutsche Grammophon
	Leoncavallo: I Medici	Plácido Domingo; Carlos Alvarez; Daniela Dessì; Renata Lamanda	Alberto Veronesi; Maggio Musicale Fiorentino Orchestra & chorus			Deutsche Grammophon; Cat: 477 7456
2011	Giordano: Fedora	Plácido Domingo; Angela Gheorghiu; Nino Machaidze; Fabio Maria Capitanucci	Alberto Veronesi; Orchestre symphonique & choeurs de la Monnaie			Deutsche Grammophon; Cat: 477 8367
2014	Puccini: Manon Lescaut	Andrea Bocelli; Ana María Martínez et al.	Plácido Domingo; Orquestra de la Comunitat Valenciana; Coro de la Generalitat Valenciana			Decca; Cat: 0289 478 7490

=== Live recordings ===
Year	Composer: Title	Cast	Conductor, ensemble	Awards	Label
1961	Verdi: La traviata	Plácido Domingo; Manuel Ausensi; Anna Moffo et al.	Nicola Rescigno; Belles Artes Palace Orchestra; Palacio de Bellas Artes chorus		Melodram; Cat: GM60018
1966	Donizetti: Anna Bolena	Plácido Domingo; Elena Souliotis; Marilyn Horne et al.	Henry Lewis; New York Opera Orchestra & chorus		Legato Classics; Cat: 149-3
1967	Puccini: Tosca	Plácido Domingo; Jeannine Crader; Richard Fredricks et al.	Emerson Buckley; New York City Opera Orchestra & chorus		Foyer; Cat: 2023
	Bizet: Carmen	Plácido Domingo; Regina Resnik; Nancy Stokes et al.	Antonio Guadagno; Santiago Teatro Municipal Orchestra & chorus		Legato; Cat: 194; Lyric; Cat: 194-2
1968	Verdi: Don Carlo	Plácido Domingo; Sena Jurinac; Cesare Siepi et al.	Silvio Varviso; Vienna State Opera Orchestra & chorus		SRO; Cat: 850
	Leoncavallo: Pagliacci	Plácido Domingo; Maralin Niska; Calvin Marsh et al.	Julius Rudel; New York City Opera Orchestra & chorus		Foyer; Cat: 2024
	Bizet: Carmen	Plácido Domingo; Mignon Dunn; Sylvia Cooper et al.	Antonio Guadagno; Cincinnati Orchestra & chorus		Melodram; Cat: 27034
	Puccini: Tosca	Plácido Domingo; Birgit Nilsson; William Dooley et al.	George Schick; Metropolitan Opera Orchestra & chorus		Nuova Era; Cat: 2286-7
	Puccini: Il tabarro	Plácido Domingo; Jeannine Crader; Chester Ludgin et al.	Julius Rudel; New York City Opera Orchestra & chorus		Melodram; Cat: 17048
	Verdi: Il trovatore	Plácido Domingo; Montserrat Caballé; Ruža Baldani et al.	Knud Andersson; New Orleans Opera Orchestra & chorus		Melodram; Cat: 27047
1969	Verdi: Ernani	Plácido Domingo; Raina Kabaivanska; Carlo Meliciani et al.	Antonino Votto; Teatro alla Scala Orchestra & chorus		Opera D'Oro; Cat: ODO 1468
	Massenet: Manon	Plácido Domingo; Beverly Sills; Richard Fredricks et al.	Julius Rudel; New York Opera Orchestra & chorus		Melodram; Cat: 27054
	Verdi: Don Carlo	Plácido Domingo; Montserrat Caballé; Dimiter Petkov et al.	Eliahu Inbal; Orch. e Coro dell'Arena di Verona		Melodram; Cat: 37057
1970	Verdi: Don Carlo	Plácido Domingo; Rita Orlandi-Malaspina; Nicolai Ghiaurov et al.	Claudio Abbado; Teatro all Scala Orchestra & chorus		Hunt; Cat: 582
	Donizetti: Roberto Devereux	Plácido Domingo; Susanne Marsee; Beverly Sills et al.	Julius Rudel; New York City Opera Orchestra & chorus		Melodram; Cat: 270 107
	Beethoven: Missa solemnis	Plácido Domingo; Ingrid Bjoner; Christa Ludwig; Kurt Moll	Wolfgang Sawallisch; RAI Rome Symphony Orchestra		Arkadia; Cat: CDGI 728 1
	Donizetti: Lucia di Lammermoor	Plácido Domingo; Joan Sutherland; Mario Sereni	Richard Bonynge; Metropolitan Opera Orchestra (1 Jun 1970)		Gala; Cat: GL 100.581
	Verdi: La traviata	Plácido Domingo; Joan Sutherland; Mario Sereni	Richard Bonynge; Metropolitan Opera Orchestra (5 Dec 1970)		Gala; Cat: GL 100.581
	Puccini: Manon Lescaut	Plácido Domingo; Magda Olivero; Giulio Fioravanti	Nello Santi; Orch. e Coro dell'Arena di Verona (30 Jul 1970)		Foyer; Cat: 2033
	Puccini: Manon Lescaut	Plácido Domingo; Raina Kabaivanska; Mario d'Anna	Nello Santi; Orch. e Coro dell'Arena di Verona (Aug 1970)		Golden Age of opera Cat: 162/63
1972	Verdi: Ernani	Plácido Domingo; Felicia Weathers; Piero Francia; Agostino Ferrin	Edward Downes; Omroep Orchestra & chorus (15 Jan 1972)		Bella Voce; Cat: BLV 107044
	Verdi: Aida	Plácido Domingo; Martina Arroyo; Fiorenza Cossotto; Piero Cappuccilli; Nicolai Ghiaurov	Claudio Abbado; Teatro all Scala Orchestra & chorus (10 Apr 1972)		Myto Records; Cat: 921.57
	Verdi: Aida	Plácido Domingo; Martina Arroyo; Fiorenza Cossotto; Piero Cappuccilli; Nicolai Ghiaurov	Claudio Abbado; Teatro all Scala Orchestra & chorus (4 Sept 1972)		Opera D'oro; Cat: 1167 & 7002; Foyer; Cat: 2-CF 2051
	Meyerbeer: L'Africaine	Plácido Domingo; Evelyn Mandac; Shirley Verrett et al.	Jean Périsson; San Francisco Opera Orchestra & chorus		Legato Classics; Cat: 166-3
	Verdi: La forza del destino	Plácido Domingo; Martina Arroyo; Gian Piero Mastromei et al.	Fernando Previtali; Teatro Colón Orchestra & chorus		Arkadia; Cat: 612-3
1973	Cilea: Adriana Lecouvreur	Magda Olivero; Plácido Domingo; Maria Luisa Nave et al.	Alfredo Silipigni; New Jersey State Orchestra & chorus		Legato Classics; Cat: 140-2
	Bizet: Carmen	Plácido Domingo; Shirley Verrett; Dame Kiri Te Kanawa et al.	Georg Solti; Royal Opera House Orchestra & chorus		Arkadia; Cat: MP 498.3
	Verdi: Un ballo in maschera	Plácido Domingo; Montserrat Caballé; Cornell MacNeil et al.	Giuseppe Patanè; Gran Teatre del Liceu Orchestra & chorus		Ornamenti; Cat: FE 103
	Verdi: Aida	Viorica Cortez; Plácido Domingo; Dame Gwyneth Jones et al.	Riccardo Muti; Vienna State Opera Orchestra & chorus		Bella Voce Records; Cat: 107209
	Zandonai: Francesca da Rimini	Plácido Domingo; Raina Kabaivanska; Matteo Manuguerra et al.	Eve Queler; New York Opera Orchestra & chorus (22 Mar 1973)		SRO; Cat: 840-2; Opera D'oro; Cat:
	Mascagni: Cavalleria rusticana; Leoncavallo: Pagliacci	Tatiana Troyanos; Plácido Domingo; Ingvar Wixell et al.	Kenneth Schermerhorn; San Francisco Opera Orchestra & chorus		Gala; Cat: 100.564
	Massenet: Le Cid	Plácido Domingo; Grace Bumbry; Paul Plishka et al.	Eve Queler; New York Opera Orchestra; Byrne Camp Chorale		CBS; Cat: 34211; Cat: 79300
	Verdi: Otello	Plácido Domingo; Mirella Freni; Piero Cappuccilli et al.	Carlos Kleiber; Teatro alla Scala Orchestra & chorus		Exclusive; Cat: EX92T 08/09
	Offenbach: Les contes d'Hoffmann	Plácido Domingo; Joan Sutherland; Huguette Tourangeau; Thomas Stewart	Richard Bonynge; Metropolitan Opera Orchestra & chorus (29 Nov 1973)		Bella Voce; Cat: BLV 107224
1974	Puccini: Tosca	Plácido Domingo; Raina Kabaivanska; Mario Zanasi et al.	Francesco Molinari-Pradelli; Teatro alla Scala Orchestra & chorus		Arkadia; Cat: 352 496
	Verdi: I vespri siciliani	Plácido Domingo; Montserrat Caballé; Justino Diaz et al.	Eve Queler; Gran Teatre del Liceu Orchestra & chorus		SRO; Cat: 837-2
	Bizet: Carmen	Plácido Domingo; Fiorenza Cossotto; José van Dam; Adriana Maliponte	Georges Prêtre; La Scala Orchestra & chorus		Opera d'Oro; Cat: 1244
1975	Verdi: Un ballo in maschera	Plácido Domingo; Katia Ricciarelli; Piero Cappuccilli et al.	Claudio Abbado; Royal Opera House Orchestra & chorus		Arkadia; Cat: 352 140
	Cilea: Adriana Lecouvreur	Montserrat Caballé; Plácido Domingo; Janet Coster	Gian Franco Masini; Teatro alla Scala Orchestra; Orchestre Lyrique de Radio France		Gala records Cat: GL100527
1976	Verdi: Aida	Plácido Domingo; Leontyne Price; Marilyn Horne; Cornell MacNeil; Bonaldo Gaiotti	James Levine; Metropolitan Opera Orchestra & chorus (6 Mar 1976)		Gala; Cat: GL100561
1977	Meyerbeer: L'Africaine	Montserrat Caballé; Christine Weidinger; Plácido Domingo et al.	Antonio de Almeida; Gran Teatre del Liceu Orchestra & chorus		Legato Classics; Cat: 208-2
	Massenet: Werther	Plácido Domingo; Brigitte Fassbaender; Marianne Seibel et al.	Jesús López-Cobos; Bavarian State Orchestra & chorus		Orfeo D'Or; Cat: 8767120
1978	Mascagni: Cavalleria rusticana	Plácido Domingo; Leonie Rysanek; Benito di Bella et al.	Nello Santi; Munich National Theater Orchestra & chorus		Legato Classics; Cat: 202-1
	Verdi: Il trovatore	Plácido Domingo; Fiorenza Cossotto; Raina Kabaivanska; Piero Cappuccilli	Herbert von Karajan; Vienna Opera Orchestra & chorus (1 May 1978)		RCA; Cat: 74321 61951 2
	Bizet: Carmen	Plácido Domingo; Elena Obraztsova; Isobel Buchanan et al.	Carlos Kleiber; Vienna State Opera Orchestra & chorus		Exclusive; Cat: EXL 11
	Verdi: Don Carlo	Plácido Domingo; Margaret Price; Renato Bruson et al.	Claudio Abbado; Teatro alla Scala Orchestra & chorus		Bella Voce Records
	Verdi: Otello	Plácido Domingo; Kostas Paskalis; Margaret Price et al.	Nello Santi; Paris National Teater Orchestra & chorus		Bella Voce Records; Cat: 107.231
1979	Verdi: Luisa Miller	Plácido Domingo; Renata Scotto; Sherrill Milnes; Bonaldo Giaiotti; James Morris	James Levine; Metropolitan Opera Orchestra & chorus (27 Jan 1979)		Gala; Cat: 100.563
	Verdi: Aida	Plácido Domingo; Anna Tomowa-Sintow; Brigitte Fassbaender; Siegmund Nimsgern; Robert Lloyd	Riccardo Muti; Bavarian State Opera Orchestra & chorus (22 Mar 1979)		Orfeo D'Or; Cat: C583 022 I
	Mercadante: Il giuramento	Agnes Baltsa; Plácido Domingo; Mara Zampieri et al.	Gerd Albrecht; Vienna State Opera Orchestra & chorus		Orfeo D'Or; Cat: 680062
Giordano: Andrea Chenier	Plácido Domingo; Éva Marton; Renato Bruson	Bruno Bartoletti; Lyric Opera of Chicago Orchestra (23 Nov 1979)		Gala; Cat: GL 100 562	
1980	Puccini: Manon Lescaut	Plácido Domingo; Renata Scotto; Pablo Elvira; Renato Capecchi	James Levine; Metropolitan Opera Orchestra & chorus		Myto; Cat: MCD 023263
	Verdi: Requiem	Plácido Domingo; Montserrat Caballé; Bianca Berini; Paul Plishka	Zubin Mehta; New York Philharmonic; Musica Sacra chorus (24, 25 & 27 Oct)		CBS; Cat: 36927; Sony Masterworks; Cat: 88765456722
1981	Verdi: Otello	Plácido Domingo; Anna Tomowa-Sintow; Silvano Carroli et al.	Carlos Kleiber; Teatro alla Scala Orchestra & chorus		Artists; Cat: 020-2
1985	Andrew Lloyd Webber: Requiem	Plácido Domingo; Sarah Brightman	Lorin Maazel; English Chamber Orchestra; Winchester Cathedral Choir	Grammy; Award (for composer)	Decca; Cat: 448616
1991	Beethoven: Missa solemnis	Plácido Domingo; Cheryl Studer; Jessye Norman; Kurt Moll	James Levine; Vienna Philharmonic Orchestra		Deutsche Grammophon; Cat: 435 770
	Puccini: La fanciulla del West	Plácido Domingo; Mara Zampieri; Juan Pons	Lorin Maazel; Teatro alla Scala Orchestra & chorus (27 & 31 Jan and 3 & 7 Feb 1991)		Sony; Cat: S2K 47 189
1992	Tosca	Plácido Domingo; Catherine Malfitano; Ruggero Raimondi	Zubin Mehta; RAI Orchestra Sinfonica and Coro di Roma		Teldec; Cat: 0630123722
1993	Wagner: Die Walküre, Act 1	Plácido Domingo; John Tomlinson; Deborah Polaski	Daniel Barenboim; Berlin State Opera Orchestra		Elektra / WEA
	Giordano: Fedora	Mirella Freni; Plácido Domingo; Adelina Scarabelliet et al.	Gianandrea Gavazzeni; Teatro alla Scala Orchestra & chorus		Legato Classics; Cat: 213
	Gomes: Il Guarany	Plácido Domingo; Hao Jiang Tian; Veronica Villarroel et al.	John Neschling; Bonn State Opera Orchestra & chorus (Jun 1994)		Sony; Cat: 66273
	Massenet: Hérodiade	Plácido Domingo; Renée Fleming; Dolora Zajick et al.	Valery Gergiev; San Francisco Opera Orchestra & chorus (5–15 Nov 1994)		Sony; Cat: 66847
1995	Massenet: Hérodiade	Plácido Domingo; Agnes Baltsa; Juan Pons	Marcello Viotti; Wiener Staatsoper Orchestra & chorus (12 Feb 1995)		RCA Red Seal; Cat: 74321 79597 2
2002	Wagner: Parsifal	Plácido Domingo; Waltraud Meier; Falk Struckmann et al.	Christian Thielemann; Vienna State Opera Orchestra & chorus		Deutsche Grammophon; Cat: 477 6006
2008	Torroba: Luisa Fernanda	Plácido Domingo; Nancy Herrera; Mariola Cantarero et al.	Jesús López-Cobos; Teatro Real Coro y Orquesta Titular del		Deutsche Grammophon; Cat: 476 5825
2014	Verdi: Giovanna d'Arco	Plácido Domingo; Anna Netrebko; Francesco Meli et al.	Paolo Carignani; Münchner Rundfunkorchester		Deutsche Grammophon

== Singles ==
Year	Song	Peak chart positions				Label	Album
Year	Song	US	US Latin	UK	GER	Label	Album
1981	"Perhaps Love" (with John Denver)	59	—	46	—	CBS; Cat: M-38747-1981	Perhaps Love
1982	"Mi Buenos Aires querido"	—	—	—	—	Deutsche Grammophon; Cat:	Plácido Domingo Sings Tangos
	"Adoro"	—	—	—	—	CBS Records; Cat: A-2069	Adoro
	"El Mundial: España 82 (Tema Oficial del Mundial 82)"	—	—	—	—	Polydor; Cat: 20 62 357	N/A
	"Granada"	—	—	—	—	Polydor; Cat: 20 14 339	
1983	"Remembering"	—	—	—	—	CBS; Cat:38-03748	My Life for a Song
1984	"Love Came for Me"	—	—	—	—	Columbia; Cat:38-04559	Save Your Nights for Me
1985	"A Love Until the End of Time" (with Maureen McGovern)	—	—	—	—	CBS; Cat: 38-05425	Save Your Nights for Me
1986	"An American Hymn"	—	—	—	—	CBS; Cat: 650044	Perhaps Love
1989	"Soñadores de España" (with Julio Iglesias)	—	—	—	—	CBS/ARIC; Cat: 2308	Soñadores de España
	"Till I Loved You" (with Jennifer Rush)	—	—	24	—	CBS; Cat:	Goya: A Life in Song
1990	"El grito de América"	—	—	—	—	CBS/ARIC; Cat: 2364	Soñadores de España
	"Nessun Dorma" (with Luis Cobos, conductor)	—	—	59	—	Epic; Cat:	Opera Extravaganza
	"Valencia"	—	—	—	—	EMI; Cat: 006-1224077	Be My Love: An Album of Love
1991	"Bésame mucho" (with Paloma San Basilio)	—	—	—	—	Hispavox; Cat: 006 4023847	Por fin juntos
	"El Día Que Me Quieras" (with Paloma San Basilio)	—	—	—	—	Hispavox; Cat: 006 4023837	Por fin juntos
1992	"Hasta amarte" (with Gloria Estefan)	—	8	—	—	Sony; Cat:	Goya: Una vida hecha canción
1994	"Libiamo"/"La donna è mobile" (with Luciano Pavarotti and José Carreras)	—	—	21	—	Teldec; Cat: YZ 843	The Three Tenors in Concert 1994
1994	"Fire in Your Heart" (with Sissel Kyrkjebø)	—	—	—	26	Universal; Cat:	Innerst i sjelen (Deep Within My Soul)
1996	"Puedes Llegar" (with Gloria Estefan, Ricky Martin, Julio Iglesias, et al.)	—	2	—	—	—	Voces Unidas
1998	"You'll Never Walk Alone" (with Luciano Pavarotti and José Carreras)	—	—	35	46	Decca; Cat: 460 798-2	The Three Tenors: Paris 1998
	"La Marseillaise" (with Daniel Barenboim, conductor)	—	—	—	—	Teldec; Cat: 3984-23710-2	Symphonie Fanastique/La Marseillaise
2002	"Himno Oficial Del Centenario Del Real Madrid 1902-2002"	—	—	—	—	Real Madrid C.F. (self release)	N/A
2012	"Come What May" (with Katherine Jenkins)	—	—	—	—	Warner Bros. cat:	This Is Christmas
"—" denotes a recording that did not chart or was not released in that territory.

== Soundtracks ==
Complete opera film soundtracks are included above under Recordings of complete roles.

Year	Movie/TV show	Director	Label
1996	Hamlet	Kenneth Branagh	Sony, Cat: 62857
1999	La otra conquista (The Other Conquest)	Salvador Carrasco	EMI Classics / EMI Latin, Cat: 25947
2006	Alborada		EMI Latin

== Filmography ==
=== Movies ===
Year	Title	Role	Cast	Director, conductor, ensemble	Awards (for the films)	Label
1974	Madama Butterfly	Pinkerton	Plácido Domingo; Mirella Freni; Christa Ludwig	Jean-Pierre Ponnelle; Herbert von Karajan; Vienna Philharmonic orchestra & chorus		DVD: Deutsche Grammophon; Cat: 00440 073 4037
1976	Tosca	Cavaradossi	Plácido Domingo; Raina Kabaivanska; Sherrill Milnes	Bruno Bartoletti; New Philharmonia Orchestra; Ambrosian Singers		DVD: Deutsche Grammophon; Cat: 00440 073 4038
1982	Cavalleria rusticana	Turiddu	Plácido Domingo; Elena Obraztsova; Renato Bruson	Franco Zeffirelli; Georges Prêtre; Teatro alla Scala orchestra & chorus		DVD: Deutsche Grammophon; Cat: 0044007 34033
1982	Pagliacci	Canio	Plácido Domingo; Teresa Stratas; Juan Pons	Franco Zeffirelli; Georges Prêtre; Teatro alla Scala orchestra & chorus	Emmy Award	DVD: Deutsche Grammophon; Cat: 0044007 34033
1982	La traviata	Alfredo	Plácido Domingo; Teresa Stratas; Cornell MacNeil	Franco Zeffirelli; James Levine; Metropolitan Opera orchestra & chorus	2 Oscar nominations Golden Globe nomination 2 Bafta Awards; National Board of Review Award	DVD: Universal Studios; Cat: 0 2519-20326-2 2
1984	Carmen	Don José	Plácido Domingo; Julia Migenes; Ruggero Raimondi	Francesco Rosi; Lorin Maazel	Golden Globe nomination 2 Bafta nominations César Award; National Board of Review Award	DVD: Sony Pictures; Cat:
1986	Otello	Otello	Plácido Domingo; Katia Ricciarelli; Justino Díaz	Franco Zeffirelli; Lorin Maazel; Teatro alla Scala orchestra & chorus	Oscar nomination Golden Globe nomination Bafta nomination National Board of Review Award; Palme d'Or nomination Cannes Film Festival	DVD: MGM; Cat: 0 27616 88420 6
1992	Tosca	Cavaradossi	Plácido Domingo; Catherine Malfitano; Ruggero Raimondi	Zubin Mehta; RAI Orchestra Sinfonica and Coro di Roma	3 Emmy Awards	VHS: Teldec Video; Cat: 630 277 9715
2001	Moulin Rouge!	Man in the Moon (voice)	Plácido Domingo; Nicole Kidman; Ewan McGregor	Baz Luhrmann	2 Oscars & 6 nominations 3 Golden Globes; 3 Baftas Awards; 2 AFI Awards	DVD: Cat:
2008	Beverly Hills Chihuahua	Monte (voice)	Plácido Domingo; Piper Perabo; Jamie Lee Curtis	Raja Gosnell		DVD: Disney; Cat:
2014	The Book of Life	Skeleton Jorge (voice)	Plácido Domingo; Diego Luna; Channing Tatum	Jorge R. Gutiérrez	Golden Globe nomination	DVD: Cat:

=== Videos ===
Year	Title	Performer	Conductor, ensemble	Awards	Certifications	Label
1973	Carmen: The Dream and the Destiny	Plácido Domingo; Hugette Tourangeau; Marina Krilovici; Tom Krause	Alain Lombard; Hamburg State Opera			DVD: Allegro Films
1983	The Metropolitan Opera Centennial Gala	Plácido Domingo; Mirella Freni	James Levine; Metropolitan Opera Orchestra	Daytime Emmy Award 1984		DVD: Deutsche Grammophon; Cat: 00440-073-4538
1990	Plácido Domingo: Great Scenes (Ernani, Manon Lescaut, Les contes d'Hoffmann, La fanciulla del West, Andrea Chénier)	Plácido Domingo; Nicolai Ghiaurov; Kiri Te Kanawa; Robert Tear; Claire Powell; Anna Tomowa-Sintow	Various conductors and ensembles			DVD: Kultur Video; Cat: 0032031 40489
1991	The Metropolitan Opera Gala 1991 (act 3 of Otello and a duet from La bohème)	Plàcido Domingo; Justino Díaz; Mirella Freni; Luciano Pavarotti	James Levine; Metropolitan Opera Orchestra	Primetime Emmy Award 1992: Outstanding Individual Achievement – Classical Music/Dance Programming – Performance		DVD: Deutsche Grammophon; Cat: 00440 073 4582
1991	Plácido Domingo: Hommage a Sevilla (Don Giovanni, Il barbiere di Siviglia, Carmen, La forza del destino, Fidelo, El gato montés)	Plácido Domingo	James Levine; Vienna Symphony	Emmy Award (Great Performances 1984)		DVD: Deutsche Grammophon; Cat: 00440 073 4289
1996	James Levine's 25th Anniversary Metropolitan Opera Gala	Plácido Domingo; Samuel Ramey	James Levine; Metropolitan Opera Orchestra			DVD: Deutsche Grammophon; Cat: B0004602-09
1998	Wagner Parsifal: The Story of the Opera	Plácido Domingo	Valery Gergiev; Mariinsky Theater; The Kirov Orchestra and Chorus			DVD: Kultur Video; Cat: 0032031 18509
2004	Great Puccini Love Scenes and Other Opera Favorites (Il tabarro, La fanciulla del West, Manon Lescaut, La bohème, Otello, Madama Butterfly, Tosca, Ernani, Die Fledermaus, Les contes d'Hoffmann)	Plácido Domingo; Kiri Te Kanawa; Ileana Cotrubaş; Mirella Freni et al.	Various conductors and ensembles			DVD: Kultur Video; Cat: 2014
2006	The Berlin Concert: Live from the Waldbühne	Plácido Domingo; Rolando Villazon; Anna Netrebko	Marco Armiliato; Orchester der Deutschen Oper Berlin		GER: Gold	DVD: Deutsche Grammophon
2007	Amor, Vida de Mi Vida	Plácido Domingo; Ana Maria Martinez	Jesús López-Cobos; Mozarteum Orchestra Salzburg			DVD: Unitel Classica; Cat: 80242 72476
2009	Plácido Domingo: My Greatest Roles	With various performers	Various conductors and ensembles			DVD: Kultur; Cat: 3203145249 7
2009	Plácido Domingo Vol. 1 (Puccini: Tosca, Manon Lescaut, La fanciulla del West)	Plácido Domingo; Catherine Malfitano; Kiri Te Kanawa; Carol Neblett et al.	Zubin Mehta; Giuseppe Sinopoli; Nello Santi; RAI Orchestra Sinfonica; Royal Opera House			DVD: Kultur Video; Cat: 3203146039 3
2010	Plácido Domingo Vol. 2 (Verdi: Otello, Ernani, Il trovatore)	Plácido Domingo; Kiri Te Kanawa; Mirella Freni; Raina Kabaivanska et al.	Georg Solti; Riccardo Muti; Herbert von Karajan; Royal Opera House; Teatro alla Scala; Vienna State Opera			DVD: Kultur Video; Cat: 3203146139 0
2011	Plácido Domingo Vol. 4 (Verismo Opera: Andrea Chénier, El gato montés, Pagliacci)	Plácido Domingo; Anna Tomowa-Sintow; Veronica Villarroel et al.	Julius Rudel; Miguel Roa; Leonard Slatkin; Royal Opera House; LA Music Center Opera; Washington national Opera			DVD: Kultur Video; Cat: 3203146509 1

=== Filmed stage roles ===
Year	Composer: Title	Cast	Conductor, ensemble	Awards	Label
1970	Verdi: Requiem	Plácido Domingo; Ruggero Raimondi; Martina Arroyo	Leonard Bernstein; London Symphony orchestra & chorus		DVD: Kultur Video; Cat: 1344
1975	Verdi: Un ballo in maschera	Plácido Domingo; Katia Ricciarelli; Reri Grist	Claudio Abbado; Royal Opera House orchestra & chorus		DVD: Kultur Video; Cat:
1976	Puccini: Tosca	Plácido Domingo; Hildegard Behrens; Cornell MacNeil	Giuseppe Sinopoli; Metropolitan Opera orchestra & chorus		VHS: Deutsche Grammophon; Cat: 02894 317 7528
	Mascagni: Cavalleria rusticana	Plácido Domingo; Fiorenza Cossotto; Attilio d'Orazi	Oliviero De Fabritiis; NHK Symphony Orchestra		DVD: Video Artists International (VAI); Cat: 4438
	Leoncavallo: Pagliacci	Plácido Domingo; Elena Mauti-Nunziata; Benito di Bella	Oliviero De Fabritiis; NHK Symphony Orchestra		DVD: Video Artists International (VAI); Cat: 4438
1977	Verdi: Rigoletto	Plácido Domingo; Cornell MacNeil; Ileana Cotrubaș	James Levine; Metropolitan Opera orchestra & chorus		DVD: Deutsche Grammophon; Cat: 00440 073 0930
1978	Bizet: Carmen	Plácido Domingo; Elena Obraztsova; Isobel Buchanan	Carlos Kleiber; Vienna Opera orchestra & chorus		DVD: Tdk DVD Video; Cat: 8 24121 00097 4
	Verdi: Il trovatore	Plácido Domingo; Fiorenza Cossotto; Raina Kabaivanska, Piero Cappuccilli	Herbert von Karajan; Vienna Opera orchestra & chorus		DVD: Tdk DVD Video; Cat:
1979	Verdi: Luisa Miller	Plácido Domingo; Renata Scotto; Sherrill Milnes	James Levine; Metropolitan Opera orchestra & chorus		DVD: Deutsche Grammophon; Cat: 00440 073 4027
1980	Puccini: Manon Lescaut	Plácido Domingo; Renata Scotto; Pablo Elvira	James Levine; Metropolitan Opera orchestra & chorus		DVD: Deutsche Grammophon; Cat: 00440 073 4241
1981	Offenbach: The Tales of Hoffmann	Plácido Domingo; Luciana Serra; Agnes Baltsa	Georges Prêtre; Royal Opera House orchestra & chorus	Grammy nomination	DVD: Kultur Video; Cat: 06301 93922
	Giordano: Andrea Chénier	Plácido Domingo; Piero Cappuccilli; Gabriela Beňačková	Nello Santi; Vienna Opera orchestra & chorus		DVD: Deutsche Grammophon; Cat: 00440 073 4070
	Saint-Saëns: Samson et Dalila	Plácido Domingo; Shirley Verrett; Wolfgang Brendel	Julius Rudel; San Francisco Opera orchestra & chorus		DVD: Kultur Video; Cat: 032031 00109 1
1982	Puccini: La fanciulla del West	Plácido Domingo; Carol Neblett; Silvano Carroli	Nello Santi; Royal Opera House orchestra & chorus		DVD: Kultur Video; Cat: 032031203891
	Berlioz: Les Troyens	Plácido Domingo; Tatiana Troyanos; Jessye Norman	James Levine; Metropolitan Opera orchestra & chorus		DVD: Geneon [Pioneer] Cat: 00440 073 4310
1984	Verdi: Don Carlo	Plácido Domingo; Mirella Freni; Grace Bumbry	James Levine; Metropolitan Opera orchestra & chorus		DVD: Deutsche Grammophon; Cat: 00440 073 4085
	Verdi: Ernani	Plácido Domingo; Renato Bruson; Mirella Freni	Riccardo Muti; Teatro alla Scala orchestra & chorus		DVD: Kultur Video; Cat: D72913
	Puccini: Manon Lescaut	Plácido Domingo; Dame Kiri Te Kanawa; Sir Thomas Allen	Giuseppe Sinopoli; Royal Opera House orchestra & chorus		DVD: Kultur Video
	Zandonai: Francesca da Rimini	Plácido Domingo; Renata Scotto; Cornell MacNeil	James Levine; Metropolitan Opera orchestra & chorus		DVD: Geneon [Pioneer] Cat: 00440 073 4313
1985	Puccini: Tosca	Plácido Domingo; Hildegard Behrens; Cornell MacNeil	Giuseppe Sinopoli; Metropolitan Opera orchestra & chorus		DVD: Deutsche Grammophon; Cat: 00440 073 4100
	Giordano: Andrea Chénier	Plácido Domingo; Anna Tomowa-Sintov	Julius Rudel; Royal Opera House orchestra & chorus		DVD: Kultur Video; Cat: 032031141094
1986	Ponchielli: La Gioconda	Plácido Domingo; Éva Marton; Ludmila Semtschuk	Ádám Fischer; Vienna State Opera orchestra & chorus		DVD: Image Entertainment; Cat:
1988	Puccini: Turandot	Plácido Domingo; Éva Marton; Leona Mitchell	James Levine; Metropolitan Opera orchestra & chorus		DVD: Deutsche Grammophon; Cat: 00440 073 0589
	Meyerbeer: L'Africaine	Plácido Domingo; Shirley Verrett; Ruth Ann Swenson	Maurizio Arena; San Francisco Opera orchestra & chorus		DVD: Image Entertainment; Cat:
1989	Verdi: Aida	Plácido Domingo; Aprile Millo; Dolora Zajick; Sherrill Milnes	James Levine; Metropolitan Opera orchestra & chorus		DVD: Deutsche Grammophon; Cat: 00440 073 0019
1990	Verdi: Un ballo in maschera	Plácido Domingo; Dame Josephine Barstow; Florence Quivar	Sir Georg Solti; Wiener Philharmonic		DVD: Tdk DVD Video; Cat: 8 24121 00109 4
	Wagner: Lohengrin	Plácido Domingo; Robert Lloyd; Cheryl Studer	Claudio Abbado; Vienna State Opera orchestra & chorus		DVD: Image Entertainment
1991	Puccini: La fanciulla del West	Plácido Domingo; Mara Zampieri; Juan Pons	Lorin Maazel; Teatro alla Scala orchestra & chorus		DVD: Opus Arte; Cat: OA LS3004 D
1992	Verdi: Otello	Plácido Domingo; Dame Kiri Te Kanawa; Sergei Leiferkus	Sir Georg Solti; Royal Opera House orchestra & chorus		DVD: Kultur Video; Cat: 0 32031 14929 8
	Puccini: La fanciulla del West	Plácido Domingo; Barbara Daniels; Sherrill Milnes	Leonard Slatkin; Metropolitan Opera orchestra & chorus		DVD: Deutsche Grammophon; Cat: 00440 073 4023
1993	Giordano: Fedora	Plácido Domingo; Mirella Freni; Alessandro Corbelli	Gianandrea Gavazzeni; Teatro alla Scala orchestra & chorus		DVD: Tdk DVD Video; Cat: 824121001971
	Verdi: Stiffelio	Plácido Domingo; Sharon Sweet; Vladimir Chernov	James Levine; Metropolitan Opera orchestra & chorus		DVD: Deutsche Grammophon; Cat: 00440 073 4288
1994	Puccini: Il tabarro	Plácido Domingo; Juan Pons; Teresa Stratas	James Levine; Metropolitan Opera orchestra & chorus		DVD: Deutsche Grammophon; Cat: 00440 073 4024
1995	Verdi: Simon Boccanegra	Plácido Domingo; Dame Kiri Te Kanawa; Vladimir Chernov	James Levine; Metropolitan Opera orchestra & chorus		DVD: Deutsche Grammophon; Cat: 00440 073 0319
	Verdi: Otello	Plácido Domingo; Renée Fleming; James Morris (IX)	James Levine; Metropolitan Opera orchestra & chorus		DVD: Deutsche Grammophon; Cat: 00440 073 0929
1996	Giordano: Fedora	Plácido Domingo; Mirella Freni; Jean-Yves Thibaudet	Roberto Abbado; Metropolitan Opera orchestra & chorus		DVD: Deutsche Grammophon; Cat: 00440 073 2329
1998	Saint-Saëns: Samson et Dalila	Plácido Domingo; Olga Borodina; Sergei Leiferkus	James Levine; Metropolitan Opera orchestra & chorus		DVD: Deutsche Grammophon; Cat: 00440 073 0599
2001	Verdi: Otello	Plácido Domingo; Leo Nucci; Barbara Frittoli	Riccardo Muti; Teatro alla Scala orchestra & chorus		DVD: Tdk DVD Video; Cat: 8 2412100019 6
2004	Puccini: Madama Butterfly	Daniela Dessì; Fabio Armiliato; Juan Pons	Plácido Domingo; Festival Puccini; Città Lirica orchestra & chorus		DVD: Dynamic; Cat: 33457
2006	Moreno Torroba: Luisa Fernanda	Plácido Domingo; Jose Bros; Nancy Herrera	Jesús López-Cobos; Teatro Real orchestra & chorus		DVD: Opus Arte; Cat: 009478 00969
2008	Tan Dun: The First Emperor	Plácido Domingo; Elizabeth Futral; Michelle DeYoung	Tan Dun; Metropolitan Opera orchestra & chorus		DVD: EMI Classics; Cat: 2151299
	Handel: Tamerlano	Plácido Domingo; Monica Bacelli; Ingela Bohlin; Sarah Mingardo; Jennifer Holloway	Paul McCreesh; Teatro Real orchestra & chorus		DVD: Opus Arte; Cat: OA 1006 D
2009	Alfano: Cyrano de Bergerac	Plácido Domingo; Sondra Radvanovsky; Rodney Gilfry	Patrick Fournillier; Orquestra de la Comunitat Valenciana		DVD: Naxos Unitel Classica; Cat: 2.110270
2010	Menotti: Goya	Plácido Domingo; Michelle Breedt; Íride Martínez; Christian Gerhaher	Emmanuel Villaume		DVD: Cat:
	Verdi: Simon Boccanegra	Plácido Domingo; Drianne Pieczonka; Marcello Giordano; James Morris	James Levine		DVD: Cat:
	Verdi: Simon Boccanegra	Plácido Domingo; Marina Poplavskaya; Joseph Calleja; Ferruccio Furlanetto	Antonio Pappano		DVD: Cat:
	Daniel Catán: Il Postino	Plácido Domingo; Charles Castronovo; Amanda Squitieri; Cristina Gallardo-Domâs	Grant Gershon; Los Angeles Opera orchestra & chorus		DVD: Laopera / Sony; Cat: B0093OFLNU
2012	Verdi: Simon Boccanegra	Plácido Domingo; Anja Harteros; Ferruccio Furlanetto	Daniel Barenboim; Teatro alla Scala orchestra & chorus		Blu-ray: Arthaus; Cat:
	The Enchanted Island	Plácido Domingo; Joyce DiDonato; David Daniels, Danielle de Niese, Luca Pisaroni	William Christie; Metropolitan Opera orchestra & chorus		DVD: Virgin Classics; Cat:
2014	Verdi: Il trovatore	Plácido Domingo; Anna Netrebko; Gaston Rivero	Daniel Barenboim; Staatskapelle Berlin orchestra & chorus		DVD/Blu-ray: Deutsche Grammophon; Cat:
2015	Verdi: Nabucco	Plácido Domingo; Liudmyla Monastyrska; Vitalij Kowaljow	Daniele Abbado; Royal Opera House orchestra & chorus	Olivier; Award nomination	DVD: Sony; Cat:

== See also ==
- Grammy Award for Best Opera Recording
- The Three Tenors
- List of best-selling Latin music artists
