= Romantic Arias =

Romantic Arias may refer to the following music albums:

- Romantic Arias, by Plácido Domingo discography, 1969
- Romantic Arias, by Jonas Kaufmann, 2008
- Romantic Arias, by Teatro Comunale di Bologna Orchestra featuring Nino Machaidze, 2011
