= Birgit Nilsson Prize =

Swedish music award

The Birgit Nilsson Prize
- Awarded for: outstanding achievement in classical music and opera
- Country: Sweden
- Presented by: Birgit Nilsson Stiftelsen
- Reward: US$1.000.000
- First award: 2009
- Website: birgitnilsson.com/prize/

The Birgit Nilsson Prize is the largest prize in classical music, awarded approximately every three years to an active artist or institution who has contributed an important chapter to music history.

Nearing the end of her career, Swedish dramatic soprano Birgit Nilsson established the Birgit Nilsson Foundation exclusively to support this Prize, aiming to provide incentive and inspiration for young artists to sustain their efforts over the long term and to perpetuate the art form.

The philosophy behind the Birgit Nilsson Prize is to perpetuate the legacy of Birgit Nilsson and Sweden's great operatic tradition by paying tribute to today's outstanding, active figures in music, recognizing the excellence of their work and their major contributions.

== Laureates ==
Birgit Nilsson personally chose the first laureate and put the chosen name in a sealed envelope to be opened three years after her death, which was on Christmas Day 2005. The envelope was opened on 20 February 2009 and the first laureate, who received the award, was the opera tenor and conductor Plácido Domingo. Plácido Domingo's worldwide career is well known – singing 130 different roles, more than any other tenor in history. Domingo has an extensive repertoire and has numerous accomplishments as a singer, conductor, administrator, humanitarian, and creator of young artist programs and competitions.

In 2011, the second laureate, conductor Riccardo Muti, was selected by a distinguished international panel of classical music experts from the major countries where Birgit Nilsson was most active during her career. Cited for his "extraordinary contributions in opera and concert, as well as his enormous influence in the music world both on and off the stage."

The Birgit Nilsson Prize for 2014 was awarded to the Vienna Philharmonic, which is being recognized for its extraordinary contributions during its 172 years of work in opera and concert, as well as for its enormous worldwide influence in the music world both on and off the stage through live performance, recordings, and other media.

The prize for 2018 was awarded to the Swedish soprano Nina Stemme. Stemme noted that 2018 was Nilsson's centenary year and called her "my idol."

In 2022, cellist Yo-Yo Ma received the award. Reason: "Through exceptional musicianship, passion and dedication, Yo-Yo Ma’s commitment to music helps us to imagine and build a stronger society and better future".

In 2025, the Aix-en-Provence Festival received the award for "outstanding artistic achievements, giving special recognition to the 2021 premiere of Kaija Saariaho's opera Innocence."

== Jury ==
The panel members, who are appointed by and work with the foundation's board and who serve for a period of three years, are currently:

- Susanne Rydén, Chairperson / President of the Birgit Nilsson Stiftelsen
- John Allison, Editor of Opera Magazine and critic of the Daily Telegraph (UK)
- Manuel Brug, opera and classical music critic for Die Welt (Germany)
- Stefan Forsberg, Executive and artistic director of the Royal Stockholm Philharmonic Orchestra (Sweden)
- Ara Guzelimian, Dean and Provost, Juilliard School of Music (USA)
- Elaine Padmore: consultant, broadcaster, author and former Director of Opera at the Royal Opera House, Covent Garden (UK)

== Award Ceremony ==
The first and second award ceremonies of the Birgit Nilsson Prize took place at the Royal Swedish Opera in Stockholm. On the stage where Birgit Nilsson made her debut, King Carl XVI Gustaf of Sweden presented the prize personally to star tenor, conductor and opera house director Plácido Domingo in 2008, and to Maestro Riccardo Muti, the 2011 Prize laureate. The Birgit Nilsson Prize for 2014 was presented to the Vienna Philharmonic Orchestra at the Concert Hall in Stockholm on October 8, 2014.
