= Vjekoslav Šutej =

Background information
- Born: 31 July 1951; Rijeka, SFR Yugoslavia
- Died: 2 December 2009 (aged 58) Zagreb, Croatia
- Occupation: Conductor
- Years active: 1979–2009

Vjekoslav Šutej (31 July 1951 – 2 December 2009) was a prominent Croatian orchestral conductor.

== Overview ==
Šutej studied conducting under Igor Gjadrov at the Zagreb Music Academy, before obtaining his Master of Music degree in Rome in the class of Franco Ferrara.

From 1979 to 1989 he was art director and chief conductor at the Croatian National Theatre in Split. From 1986 to 1990 he was also art director of the Hollybush Festival in New Jersey, which is where he started his international career. From 1990 to 1993 he was music director of La Fenice opera house in Venice, Italy, where he conducted opera productions of Eugene Onegin and Rigoletto.

In Spain, Šutej was a founding member of the Royal Seville Symphony Orchestra and acted as their art director and principal conductor from 1990 to 1996, and in this period he received the Freedom of the City of Seville. From 1992 to 1997 he was music director of the Houston Grand Opera, after making a sudden debut with the company with a run of Verdi's Rigoletto, starring Leo Nucci in January 1990. He conducted 133 performances there, including 19 new productions, and from 2002 to 2005 he was music director of the Dubrovnik Summer Festival.

He was also a guest conductor in many opera houses worldwide. He conducted at the Verdi Festival at Teatro Regio in Parma, at San Francisco Opera, Teatro Regio in Turin, Verona Arena, Teatro Massimo Bellini in Catania, New National Theatre Tokyo, Teatro di San Carlo in Naples, Teatro Real in Madrid, Seattle Opera, Bavarian State Opera in Munich, Berlin State Opera, Portland Opera, etc.

Starting in 1994, Šutej was also regularly invited to conduct at the Vienna State Opera, including the opening of the 2001–02 season conducting Don Carlos featuring Neil Shicoff, Marina Mescheriakova and Ferruccio Furlanetto which was broadcast on the main city squares in Vienna and Graz. From 1992 to 1995 he also conducted the first four editions of Christmas in Vienna concerts, recordings of which have sold more than 2 million copies. Šutej was also given a gold medal by the City of Vienna for his contribution in promoting music culture.

Throughout the 1990s Šutej also often conducted many concerts with some of the biggest names in both classical and popular music, such as José Carreras, Plácido Domingo, Montserrat Caballé, Dionne Warwick, Natalie Cole, Charles Aznavour, Diana Ross, Sissel Kyrkjebø, Andrea Rost, Vyacheslav Polozov, Ramón Vargas, Maria Guleghina, Ruggero Raimondi, Leo Nucci and many others.

== Death ==
In August 2008 Šutej was diagnosed with myeloid leukemia and later underwent chemotherapy treatment and a bone marrow transplantation procedure at the Fred Hutchinson Cancer Research Center in Seattle. He returned to Croatia in April 2009 but was hospitalized again two months later with symptoms of bone marrow rejection. A new donor was found and he underwent a ten-hour surgery at KBC Zagreb on 29 September, but his body rejected the transplant again, and due to postoperative complications Šutej died on 2 December 2009 at 58 years of age.

== Discography ==
Apart from the "Christmas in Vienna" concerts, he also recorded the Love Songs CD with José Carreras, CD and DVD of Pagliacci with Roberto Alagna and Svetla Vassileva, CD with Ramón Vargas & friends. La Juive for ORF with Neil Shicoff, DVD Corona di Pietra with Plácido Domingo, Andrea Chénier" with Fabio Armiliato and Daniela Dessi.
