= Christmas in Vienna III =

Christmas in Vienna III (Vienna Noël)

Live album by Plácido Domingo, Sissel Kyrkjebø and Charles Aznavour
- Released: 1995
- Recorded: December 22, 1994
- Genre: Christmas
- Length: 61:07
- Label: Sony Classical

Christmas in Vienna III (known in the US as Vienna Noël) is a 1995 Christmas album released by Spanish operatic tenor Plácido Domingo, French chanson and pop music star Charles Aznavour, and Norwegian crossover soprano Sissel Kyrkjebø on the Sony Classical label.

It was recorded on December 22, 1994, at the Alte Winterreitschule in Vienna, Austria, the third of Plácido Domingo's numerous Christmas in Vienna concerts. The Vienna Symphony, under the direction of maestro Vjekoslav Šutej, provided orchestral accompanying to the three singers, and the Vienna Children's Choir provided choral backups.

The concert proved to be a success; the recorded event was broadcast internationally and released as an album internationally during the 1995 Christmas season. It reached the number one spot on the Norwegian albums chart.

== Track listing ==
1. Hark! The Herald Angels Sing
2. Noëls D'autrefois
3. When a Child is Born
4. A Very Private Christmas
5. Ave Maria
6. Carol of the Bells
7. Es ist ein Ros entsprungen/Det Hev Ei Rose Sprunge
8. Un Enfant Est Né
9. I'll Walk with God
10. Un Enfant de Toi pour Noël/My Own Child for Christmas from You
11. The Twelve Days of Christmas
12. Medley: It's Christmas Time All Over the World/Auld Lang Syne/Let It Snow! Let It Snow! Let It Snow!/Let There Be Peace on Earth/We Wish You a Merry Christmas
13. Kum Ba Yah, My Lord
14. Silent Night/Noche de Paz/Stille Nacht

== Chart performance ==
Chart	Peak position
Belgium (Flanders)	39
Belgium (Wallonia)	25
Germany	50
Netherlands	72
Norway	1
Sweden	14

== See also ==
- Christmas in Vienna
- Christmas in Vienna II
- Christmas in Vienna VI
