= Christmas in Vienna II =

Live album by Dionne Warwick and Plácido Domingo
- Released: 1994
- Recorded: December 21, 1993
- Genre: Christmas
- Length: 52:51 minutes
- Label: Sony Classical

Professional ratings
Review scores
Source	Rating
Music Week	4/5 stars

Christmas in Vienna II is a 1994 album released by American soul singer Dionne Warwick and Spanish tenor Plácido Domingo for the Sony Classical label. This album was taken from Domingo's second televised Christmas in Vienna concert from 1993.

In the US this album is known as Celebration in Vienna. The first volume in this collection of seasonal works featured Plácido Domingo and José Carreras with Diana Ross. That album topped the U.S. Classical charts, as well as, hit the top of the European and Pan Asian charts. Pavarotti and Friends series was the inspiration for this series. Although the other five volumes did well internationally, Christmas in Vienna with Diana Ross, Plácido Domingo and José Carreras remains the crowning achievement.

The album was recorded live on December 21, 1993, at Hofburg Palace, Vienna with the Vienna Symphony Orchestra and the Mozart Sängerknaben (Mozart Boys' Choir) under the direction of maestro Vjekoslav Šutej.

== Track listing ==
1. "Smile" – Plácido Domingo, Dionne Warwick
2. "Hear My Song" – Plácido Domingo (Orchestration by Juan J. Colomer)
3. "O Holy Night" – Dionne Warwick
4. "Golondrinas" – Plácido Domingo
5. "Over the Rainbow" – Plácido Domingo, Dionne Warwick
6. "What the World Needs Now Is Love" – Dionne Warwick
7. "Ultima Canzone" – Plácido Domingo
8. "As Time Goes By" – Dionne Warwick
9. "Die Musik" – Plácido Domingo
10. "Ave Maria" (Note: It is unclear which version of "Ave Maria" this was, but the best-known ones are those by Bach/Gounod and by Schubert.) – Plácido Domingo, Dionne Warwick
11. Medley: "Mary's Boy Child"/"God Rest Ye Merry, Gentlemen"/"Once Again, I" – Plácido Domingo, Dionne Warwick
12. "Stille Nacht" (Silent Night) – Plácido Domingo, Dionne Warwick

== Chart performance ==
Chart (1994)	Peak position
Austrian Albums (Ö3 Austria)	7
German Albums (Offizielle Top 100)	5
Swedish Albums (Sverigetopplistan)	29
UK Albums (OCC)	60
US Top Classical Crossover Albums (Billboard)	15

== Certifications and sales ==
Region	Certification	Certified units/sales
Netherlands (NVPI)	Platinum	25,000^{^}
^{^} Shipments figures based on certification alone.

== See also ==
- Christmas in Vienna
- Christmas in Vienna III
- Christmas in Vienna VI
