= Christmas in Vienna VI =

Live album by Plácido Domingo, Patricia Kaas and Alejandro Fernández
- Released: September 1999
- Recorded: 1997–December 1998
- Genre: Christmas
- Length: 64:15
- Label: Sony Classical

Patricia Kaas chronology
Le mot de passe (1999)	Christmas in Vienna VI (1999)	Live (2000)

Professional ratings
Review scores
Source	Rating
AllMusic	3/5 stars

Christmas in Vienna VI (also known as Christmastime in Vienna) is the seventh album in a series of Christmas concerts recorded in Vienna with Spanish tenor Plácido Domingo. The concert that the recording comes from was the seventh Christmas in Vienna show that Domingo held since 1992, and the sixth concert recording to be released by Sony Classical. (The Erato label released the fourth Christmas in Vienna concert from 1995 that Domingo held with José Carreras and Natalie Cole.) Recorded in December 1998, it also includes the French singer Patricia Kaas and the Mexican singer Alejandro Fernández with the Vienna Symphony Orchestra directed by Steven Mercurio. The album was released in September 1999.

== Track listing ==
1. "Announcing Christmas" (Christian Kolonovits) - 2:48
2. "Y nos vamos pa' Belén" (José María Cano) - 3:02
3. "Leise rieselt der Schnee" (Eduard Ebel) - 3:00
4. "Canción de cuna (para Jesús)" (Samantha Domingo, Plácido Domingo Jr.) Orchestration by Juan J. Colomer- 3:04
5. "Merry Christmas, Baby" (Steven Krikorian, John Keller) - 4:11
6. "El niño del tambor" (Katherine K. Davis) - 4:26
7. "It Came Upon the Midnight Clear" (Richard Willis, Edmund Sears) - 2:34
8. "Here Is Christmas" (Nancy Wilson, Ann Wilson, Richie Zito) - 4:26
9. "Amours Eternels (Midnight in Moscow)" (Vassilji Solovjev-Sedoj, Philippe Bergman) - 4:23
10. "Blanca Navidad" (Irving Berlin) - 3:22
11. "Por el Valle de Rosas" (Miguel Bernal Jiménez) - 2:48

Christmas Medley:

- 12. "Ihr Kinderlein kommet" (Christoph Von Schmidt, Johann Abraham Peter Schulz) - 1:53
- 13. "Have Yourself a Merry Little Christmas" (Hugh Martin, Ralph Blane) - 2:48
- 14. "Jeg er saa glad hver julekveld" (Traditional) - 1:10
- 15. "Buenos reyes" (Traditional) - 2:15
- 16. "Christmas Must Be Tonight" (Robbie Robertson) - 2:38
- 17. "Hay que sembrar en Navidad" (Manuel Alejandro) - 4:18
- 18. "Il est né le divin enfant" (Traditional) - 1:15
- 19. "Mary's Boy Child" (Jester Hairston) - 2:40
- 20. "Ding, Dong Merrily on High" (George Ratcliffe Woodward) - 2:13
21. "Encore: Silent Night" (Franz Gruber) - 5:01

== Personnel ==
- José María Cano – Arranger
- Juan Colomer – Arranger
- Jacques Dessange – Hair Stylist
- Steven Epstein – Audio Production
- Alejandro Fernández – Performer
- Ellen Fitton – Editing Engineer
- David Foil – Liner Notes
- Andy Granger – Recording Technician
- Patricia Kaas – Performer
- Janush Kawa – Photography
- Stephane Kijek – Monitor Engineer
- Richard King – Mixing
- Christian Kolonovits – Arranger
- Bob Rapley – Engineer
- Vienna Symphony Orchestra – Performer
- Michael Vogts – Sound Technician
- Charlote Willer – Make-Up
- Tim Wood – Technical Supervisor
- Jen Wyler – Assistant Engineer
- Axel Zeininger – Photography
- Elisabeth Ziegler – Choir Master
- Joel Zimmerman – Design

== Сharts ==
Сhart performance for Christmas in Vienna VI
Chart (1999–2000)	Peak position
German Albums (Offizielle Top 100)	49
Swiss Albums (Schweizer Hitparade)	97
US Top Classical Albums (Billboard)	19
US Top Classical Crossover Albums (Billboard)	10

== See also ==
- Christmas in Vienna
- Christmas in Vienna II
- Christmas in Vienna III
