= Christmas in Vienna (album) =

Live album by Plácido Domingo, Diana Ross and José Carreras
- Released: 5 October 1993
- Recorded: 23 December 1992
- Venue: Wiener Rathaus (Vienna)
- Genres: Christmas, classical
- Length: 63:03
- Languages: Italian, English, German
- Label: Sony Classical
- Producer: Michel Glotz

Plácido Domingo chronology
| Gala Lirica (1992) | Christmas in Vienna (1993) | Celebration in Vienna (1994) |

Diana Ross chronology
| One Woman: The Ultimate Collection (1993) | Christmas in Vienna (1993) | Diana Extended: The Remixes (1994) |

José Carreras chronology
| José Carreras Sings Catalan Songs (1991) | Christmas in Vienna (1993) | Celebration in Vienna (1994) |

Professional ratings
Review scores
| Source | Rating |
|---|---|
| AllMusic | 2/5 stars |
| Encyclopedia of Popular Music | 3/5 stars |

Christmas in Vienna is a 1993 live album of American soul singer Diana Ross and Spanish tenors Plácido Domingo and José Carreras, released by Sony Classical. The concert was Domingo's first in the televised Christmas in Vienna series. It was recorded on December 23, 1992, at the Rathaus in Vienna with the Vienna Symphony Orchestra and the Gumpoldskirch Boys Choir as ensemble.

Christmas in Vienna charted in the US, peaking at No. 1 on Billboard Classical Crossover Albums for 5 weeks. It sold almost a million copies beyond these markets, reaching Gold status in four countries, Platinum in Austria and Triple Platinum in the Netherlands.

The video recording of the event aired on PBS stations as part of Great Performances the following Christmas season in the US.

== Track listing ==
=== CD ===
1. "Jingle Bells" (Pierpont) - 1:37
2. "Mille Cherubini in Coro" (Schubert) - 3:54
3. "Amazing Grace" (Newton) - 5:46
4. "Wiegenlied" (Brahms) - 2:57
5. "Carol of the Drum (Little Drummer Boy)" (Davis) - 2:58
6. "The Gift of Love" (Domingo Jr, Reilly) Orchestration by Juan J. Colomer - 3:57
7. "Navidad" (Fons, Montalban) - 4:05
8. "White Christmas" (Berlin) - 2:44
9. "Ave Maria" (Schubert) - 4:56
10. "Ave Maria" (Mascagni, from Cavalleria rusticana) - 3:38
11. "It's the Most Wonderful Time of the Year" (Pola, Wyle) - 2:42
12. "Adeste Fideles" (Oakeley, Wade) - 2:42
13. "If We Hold on Together" (Horner, Mann, Jennings) - 3:31
14. "O Tannenbaum"/"Minuit, Chrétiens"/"Jingle Bells"/"La Virgen Lava Pañales"/"O Little Town of Bethlehem"/"Tu Scendi Dalle Stelle"/"Joy to the World" (Traditional/Adolphe-Charles Adam/Henry Walford Davies/Lowell Mason) - 13:45
15. "Stille Nacht" (Gruber, Mohr) - 3:54

=== DVD ===
1. "Jingle Bells" (James S. Pierpont) - 1:37
2. "Mille Cherubini In Coro" (Alois Melichar) - 3:54
3. "Songs (5), Op. 49: no 4, Wiegenlied" (Johannes Brahms) - 2:57
4. "The Little Drummer Boy (Carol of the Drum)" (Katherine K. Davis) - 2:58
5. "Navidad" (Antoni Parera Fons) - 4:05
6. "Holiday Inn: White Christmas" (Irving Berlin) - 2:41
7. "Ellens Gesang III, D 839/Op. 52 no 6 'Ave Maria'" (Franz Schubert) - 4:58
8. "Cavalleria Rusticana: Intermezzo" (Pietro Mascagni) - 3:41
9. "It's the Most Wonderful Time of the Year" (Eddie Pola) - 2:42
10. "Adeste Fideles 'O Come, All Ye Faithful'" (John Francis Wade) - 2:40
11. "If We Hold on Together" (James Horner, Barry Mann, Will Jennings) - 3:31
12. "O Tannenbaum"/"Minuit, Chrétiens"/"Jingle Bells"/"La Virgen Lava Pañales"/"O Little Town of Bethlehem"/"Tu Scendi Dalle Stelle"/"Joy to the World" (Traditional/Adolphe-Charles Adam/Henry Walford Davies/Lowell Mason) - 13:45
13. "Silent Night" (Franz Xaver Gruber) - 3:54
14. "The Gift of Love" (Plácido Domingo Jr.) Orchestration by Juan Colomer - 3:55
15. "Amazing Grace" (John Newton) - 5:46

== Charts ==
Chart performance for Christmas in Vienna
| Chart (1993–1994) | Peak position |
|---|---|
| Austrian Albums (Ö3 Austria) | 2 |
| Danish Albums (IFPI Danmark) | 2 |
| Dutch Albums (Album Top 100) | 4 |
| European Albums (Music & Media) | 6 |
| German Albums (Offizielle Top 100) | 13 |
| Norwegian Albums (VG-lista) | 4 |
| Swedish Albums (Sverigetopplistan) | 14 |
| Swiss Albums (Schweizer Hitparade) | 7 |
| UK Albums (Official Charts) | 71 |
| US Billboard 200 | 154 |
| US Top Classical Albums (Billboard) | 2 |
| US Top Classical Crossover Albums (Billboard) | 1 |

== Certifications and sales (incomplete) ==
Certifications for Christmas in Vienna
| Region | Certification | Certified units/sales |
|---|---|---|
| Austria (IFPI Austria) | Platinum | 50,000^{*} |
| Belgium (BRMA) | Gold | 25,000^{*} |
| Germany (BVMI) | Gold | 250,000^{^} |
| Netherlands (NVPI) | 3× Platinum | 300,000^{^} |
| Norway (IFPI Norway) | Gold | 25,000^{*} |
| Switzerland (IFPI Switzerland) | Gold | 25,000^{^} |
^{*} Sales figures based on certification alone.^{^} Shipments figures based on certification alone.

== See also ==
- Christmas in Vienna II
- Christmas in Vienna III
- Christmas in Vienna VI
