= Cyrano de Bergerac (Alfano) =

Opera by Franco Alfano

- Opera by Franco Alfano
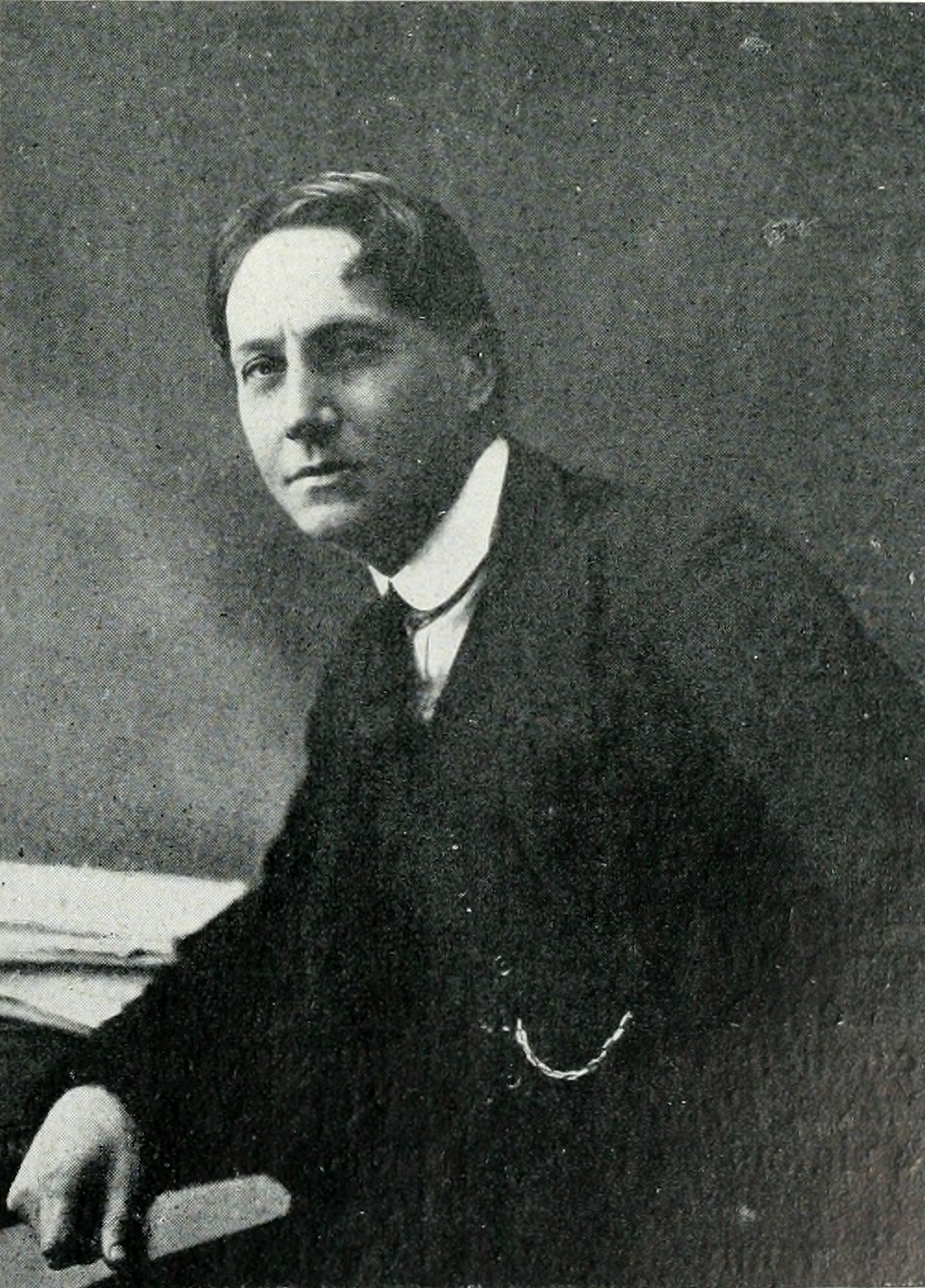
- The composer c. 1919
- Librettist: Henri Caïn
- Language: French
- Based on: Edmond Rostand's Cyrano de Bergerac
- Premiere: 22 January 1936 (in Italian); Teatro dell'Opera di Roma

Cyrano de Bergerac is a 1936 opera in four acts with music by Franco Alfano and a French libretto by Henri Caïn, based on Edmond Rostand's 1897 French drama Cyrano de Bergerac.

== Performance history ==
The opera received its world premiere at the Teatro Reale in Rome on 22 January 1936, conducted by Tullio Serafin, with soprano Maria Caniglia and tenor José Luccioni in the leading roles. The performance was sung in an Italian translation by Cesare Meano and Filippo Brusa under the title Cyrano di Bergerac.

The first performance sung in French was its French premiere on 29 May 1936, given by the Opéra-Comique at the Salle Favart in Paris, with Albert Wolff conducting and soprano Lillie Grandval and tenor José Luccioni in the leading roles. Although Alfano wrote to critic Cesare Paglia, "Cyrano had an absolutely tumultuous success in Paris!", reviews were no more than "deferential", and the opera, which was presented near the end of the season, only received three performances.

Contemporary commentary on the opera by Guido M. Gatti criticised the composer as fearing "to seem too melodramatic", and the opera for being "overdecorated and labored" and containing "difficult and tortuous vocal writing". However, the same analysis also mentioned that "the opera has moments of definite effectiveness and exquisite poetry".

Many early productions in Italy and elsewhere were sung in Italian. It was sung in Italian at its premiere at the Teatro Colón in Buenos Aires on 21 May 1937; a production starring Franca Somigli as Roxane. The opera was given two "lackluster" performances in Naples early in 1938. Magda Olivero and Antonio Melandri performed it at the Teatro della Moda in Turin in May 1939.

Cyrano was performed in Germany in February 1942, in a German translation by Georg C. Winkler, at the Neues Theater in Leipzig and later repeated in Erfurt.

Back in Italy, Maria Carbone sang in the opera in Parma in February 1950. Carla Gavazzi and Antonio Annaloro sang in a production in Palermo conducted by Francesco Molinari-Pradelli in March 1953.

The opera received its La Scala premiere on 16 May 1954, with its ailing composer present. The cast included Ramón Vinay and Anna De Cavalieri. The conductor was Antonino Votto. Photographs show Alfano congratulating the singers after the performance. Alfano died soon thereafter, probably of heart failure, on 27 October at his home in San Remo.

The opera was performed in concert in French by the RAI Turin on 27 June 1975 in celebration of the centenary of Alfano's birth. William Johns and Olivia Stapp sang the leading roles, and Maurizio Arena conducted. A recording made 6 September was released on CD by the Opera d'Oro label in 2004. A recording made 20 September was released by the Gala label in 2002.

In recent years, most productions have returned to the original French text, which was used in the Paris premiere.

A landmark revival in the original French was mounted by the Kiel Opera in May 2002. The producer was Alexander von Pfeil, and the designer, Bernd Damovsky. The lead singers were Roman Sadnik and Manuela Uhl, and the conductor, Markus Frank. An audio recording was made by cpo and DeutschlandRadio and issued on CD on the cpo label. In reviewing the CDs, the music critic John Steane stated it is "an opera that thoroughly deserves a place in the repertoire."

An "old-fashioned", traditional production was prepared for the 2003 Festival de Radio France et de Montpellier with Roberto Alagna in the title role and his two brothers David and Frédérico acting as producers and set designers but was cancelled due to labor strikes. However, a DVD was prepared from two private performances in July in the small Opéra-Comédie. The production was first presented publicly by the festival on 16 March 2006 at the almost 2,000-seat CORUM. It was also given at the Monte Carlo Opera House on 24 April 2008.

The US premiere was on 13 May 2005, when the opera was presented at the Metropolitan Opera in a production by Francesca Zambello with Plácido Domingo in the title role and Sondra Radvanovsky as the female lead Roxane and with Marco Armiliato conducting. Zambello's production was also presented with the same lead singers by London's Royal Opera in 2006 conducted by Mark Elder and Milan's La Scala in 2008 conducted by Patrick Fournillier.

The Zambello production with Domingo and Radvanovsky had been intended for presentation at the Palau de les Arts Reina Sofía in Valencia, Spain, but the collapse of a mobile stage platform necessitated the hasty creation of a new production by stage director and designer Michał Znaniecki, which was presented in February 2007 with Fournillier conducting. An HD video was recorded and released by Naxos.

In May 2017 the Metropolitan Opera revived the Zambello production with Roberto Alagna in the title role, and soprano Jennifer Rowley as Roxane in her role debut.

== Roles ==
Roles, voice types, premiere cast
Role	Voice type	Premiere cast, 22 January 1936 Conductor: Tullio Serafin
Cyrano de Bergerac, captain of the Gascon cadets, poet, and swashbuckler	tenor	José Luccioni
Roxane, his cousin	soprano	Maria Caniglia
Christian de Neuveville, new recruit	tenor	Alessio De Paolis
De Guiche, commander of the cadets	baritone	Giuseppe Manacchini
Ragueneau, baker	bass-baritone	Emilio Ghirardini
Vicomte de Valvert	baritone	Mario Bianchi
Carbon, captain	bass	Giacomo Vaghi
Le Bret	bass-baritone	Ernesto Dominici
Lignière	baritone	Saturno Meletti
Montfleury, actor of the Hôtel de Bourgogne	silent	
La duègne (duenna), governess	mezzo-soprano	Agnese Dubbini
Soeur Marthe	mezzo-soprano	Edmea Limberti
Lisa, Ragueneau's wife	soprano	Matilde Arbuffo
Spanish officer	baritone	Millo Marucci
Cook	baritone	
Musketeer	bass	
First sentinel	tenor	
Second sentinel	tenor	

== Synopsis ==
=== Act 1 ===
Theater of the Hôtel de Bourgogne, 1640

Nobles and commoners, including Le Bret, Ragueneau, Christian, and Lignière, have gathered for a theatrical performance. Among the actors is Roxane, whose beauty is admired by all. The performance begins with Montfleury's entrance, but he is interrupted after only a few words by a heckler. Cyrano de Bergerac had forbidden Montfleury from performing for a month and now drives him from the stage with threats. The agitated audience is divided. Some side with Cyrano, others with Montfleury. The Vicomte de Valvert speaks out against Cyrano, mentioning his large nose. Immediately, Cyrano draws his rapier and attacks Valvert. During the duel, he entertains the audience with an improvised ballad, describing his movements. The audience cheers his victory. Cyrano explains to Le Bret the reason for his prohibition: Montfleury had cast an unseemly glance at Roxane, whom he adores. He himself, however, has no hope that she could reciprocate his love because of his misshapen nose. Then her governess informs him that Roxane expects him the next morning for a private conversation at Ragueneau's shop. Cyrano is so excited with anticipation that he wants to cool off in a fight. Therefore, a plea for help from Lignière, who is being threatened by the Count de Guiche's men because of a satirical poem, is most welcome. He invites those present to watch the anticipated battle at the Porte de Nesle.

=== Act 2 ===
Scene 1: In Ragueneau's bakery kitchen and pastry shop

The next morning, Ragueneau awaits his friend Cyrano and Roxane. Pastry chefs present him with the food they have prepared. One after another, Ragueneau's wife Lise, the impatient Cyrano, some musketeers, and poets arrive. The latter recount an astonishing battle at the Porte de Nesle, in which a single man defeated an entire band. Cyrano modestly omits the fact that he himself was this hero. Finally, Roxane appears, and the others retire. Roxane first thanks Cyrano for his intervention the previous evening—the enamored De Guiche had tried to force Valvert upon her as a "sham husband." But Cyrano's hope for a declaration of love from Roxane is quickly dashed when she tells him of her love for the young cadet Christian. He had been too shy to reveal himself to her, but she was certain of his love because of his ardent gaze. She asked Cyrano, who served in the same regiment, to watch over him and protect him from duels. With the suggestion that Christian should write her a letter, she departed.

Ragueneau and the poets returned, and the cadets from Cyrano's regiment also gathered at the tavern to celebrate Cyrano's victory. Everyone sang a cheerful song ("Ce sont les cadets de Gascogne"). De Guiche tried to recruit Cyrano but had to leave empty-handed. Among the cadets was Christian, who met Cyrano for the first time. Captain Carbon warned him, just to be safe, against making any comments about Cyrano's nose. When Cyrano recounted his battle at the Porte de Nesle, the exuberant Christian couldn't resist interrupting him again and again. Cyrano ignores this for a while, but then sends his comrades out, who are already worried about Christian. However, when Cyrano is alone with Christian, he embraces him, introduces himself as Roxane's cousin, and tells him of her love. It turns out that Christian doesn't feel confident enough to write the letter Roxane expects. Cyrano, on the other hand, would find it easy. The two make a pact: they will woo Roxane together. Christian is handsome, and Cyrano lends him his eloquence.

Scene 2: Square in front of Roxane's house, dusk

Roxane is talking with her governess. The two are about to leave for a lecture on love. De Guiche appears to say goodbye to Roxane. He has to go to war that very evening, as the city of Arras is under siege. He has been appointed colonel of the Guards regiment, in which Cyrano and Christian also serve. For him, this is the perfect opportunity to take revenge on Cyrano. Roxane deceives De Guiche into believing she is on his side. She claims that it would be a far greater punishment for Cyrano if he were not allowed to participate in the fighting. Through this ruse, she manages to persuade De Guiche to exempt the cadet company (and Christian) from the war.

After De Guiche leaves, Cyrano arrives. He learns from Roxane that she intends to ask Christian to improvise on love during their rendezvous. Roxane and her governess retire to the house. Cyrano summons the already waiting Christian to prepare him for his task. However, Christian is determined to speak with Roxane without Cyrano's assistance. She emerges from the house with the governess, who bids him farewell, regretting that they have missed the lecture. Roxane calls Christian to her and demands that he speak about love. His unimaginative answers disappoint her so much that she dismisses him. Christian has no choice but to ask Cyrano for help. The two stand beneath her balcony and call out to her. Cyrano hides in the shadows. At first, Cyrano prompts Christian with the poetic declarations of love. When this proves too tedious, he continues himself, using a disguised voice. Roxane is so thrilled that she lets Christian climb onto her balcony to hug and kiss him.

=== Act 3 ===
Siege of Arras, Cadets' Camp, 1640

Despite De Guiche's assurances, the cadets were transferred to the French-besieged city of Arras, where they held an outpost. Meanwhile, Spanish troops had arrived and were cutting off the besiegers' supplies. While the soldiers slept, Cyrano sneaked through the enemy lines each morning to deliver letters supposedly from Christian to Roxane. To distract his comrades from their hunger, he asked an old shepherd to play familiar tunes on his flute. A signal announced De Guiche's arrival. When he boasted of his bravery under enemy musket fire, Cyrano pointed out that he had lost his white sash. De Guiche explained that he had deliberately dropped it to deceive the enemy. Cyrano then produced the sash. He had brought it back himself from his last excursion. De Guiche informs his men that a Spanish attack is imminent. While everyone prepares, Christian asks Cyrano to write a farewell letter to Roxane, just in case. Cyrano has already done so. Christian notices the remnants of a tear on the letter. Cyrano also admits to having written her two letters every day. Just then, a carriage arrives. Roxane herself has broken through the besiegers' lines, persuading them to let her through with the words, "I am visiting my beloved." Since she cannot be persuaded to leave the camp despite the impending danger, Carbon asks her for her neckerchief, which he intends to use as a flag during the battle. Ragueneau also gets out of the carriage. He has brought plenty of provisions, and everyone celebrates one last time before the battle. Roxane explains to Christian that his letters impressed her so deeply that she absolutely had to see him again. Outward beauty no longer interests her, only his soul. Christian sends her to the cadets so they can have one last smile before their possible deaths. He now knows Cyrano's true feelings for Roxane and urges him to confess them so she can choose between them. When Roxane returns, she swears to Cyrano that she would love Christian even if his appearance were repulsive and grotesque. Just as Cyrano begins to feel hopeful, the battle begins. Christian falls at the very start. Roxane throws herself, sobbing, over his body and finds the suicide note. In the distance, the battle rages on.

=== Act 4 ===
The park of the Convent of the Sisters of the Cross in Paris, 15 years later, 1655

Grief-stricken over Christian's death, Roxane has retreated to a convent. De Guiche visits Roxane, who has since forgiven him. She tells him that Cyrano also comes frequently. Le Bret arrives and reports that Cyrano is growing increasingly bitter and is constantly making new enemies with his scathing writings. As Roxane escorts De Guiche out, Ragueneau appears and whispers something to Le Bret. The two hurry away. Somewhat late and looking exhausted, Cyrano arrives for the appointed visit and begins to tell Roxane the news of the past week. He explains a brief fainting spell with his old wound from Arras. Then he asks if he may see Christian's last letter once more. He reads it aloud and so movingly that Roxane recognizes the truth: They are Cyrano's own words, and he has always loved her. Le Bret and Ragueneau return, horrified to find Cyrano there. Cyrano then finishes his chronicle: "And on Saturday the 26th, an hour before dinner, Monsieur de Bergerac died by an assassin's hand." Ragueneau explains that he was attacked from behind with a piece of wood. Roxane finally recognizes her love for Cyrano. But it is too late. He collapses, dying. In his last words, he insists that although fame and love were denied him, at least he still has his courage.

== Recordings ==
All recordings are sung in French.

=== Audio ===
- 1975: William Johns as Cyrano, Olivia Stapp as Roxane, Ezio di Cesare as Cristian. Conductor: Maurizio Arena, RAI Orchestra & Chorus, Turin. Performed live in June 1975. Recorded 6 September 1975 and released on CD in 2004 by Opera d'Oro, a division of Allegro Corporation (OPD 1411). Despite the booklet showing the track titles in Italian, the opera is actually sung in French. Another recording, made 20 September 1975, was released on CD in 2002 by Gala, IMC Music Ltd (GL 100.704). It is also in French.
- 2002: Roman Sadnik as Cyrano, Manuela Uhl as Roxane, Paul McNamara as Christian, Wolfgang Newerla as De Guiche, Matthias Klein as Raguneau. Conductor: Markus L. Frank, Kiel Opera Chorus; Kiel Philharmonic Orchestra. Recorded live, 12 and 30 May 2002, Opernhaus Kiel. CD: cpo CPO999 909-2.
- 2006: Antonio Barasorda as Cyrano, Sondra Radvanovsky as Roxane, Raymond Very as Christian, Anthony Michaels-Moore as De Guiche, Roberto de Candia as Raguneau. Conductor: Marco Armiliato, Metropolitan Opera Orchestra & Chorus. Recorded live, 4 February 2006, Metropolitan Opera House (Lincoln Center). Streaming audio: Internet Archive (part 1, part 2).
- 2017: Roberto Alagna as Cyrano, Jennifer Rowley as Roxane, Atalla Ayan as Christian, Juan Jesús Rodriquez as De Guiche, Roberto de Candia as Raguneau. Conductor: Marco Armiliato, Metropolitan Opera Orchestra & Chorus. Recorded live, 6 May 2017, Metropolitan Opera House (Lincoln Center). Streaming audio: Met Opera on Demand.

=== Video ===
- 2003: Roberto Alagna as Cyrano, Nathalie Manfrino as Roxane, Richard Troxell as Christian, Nicolas Rivenq as De Guiche, Marc Barrard as Ragueneau, Frank Ferrari as De Valvert/Carbon, Jaël Azzaretti. Conductor: Marco Guidarini, Orchestre National de Montpellier. Stage production, set design: David and Frédérico Alagna; recorded live, July 2003, Festival de Radio France et de Montpellier. DVD: Deutsche Grammophon, cat. no. 4688259.
- 2007: Plácido Domingo as Cyrano, Sondra Radvanovsky as Roxane, Arturo Chacón Cruz as Christian, Rod Gilfry as De Guiche, Corrado Carmelo Caruso as Ragueneau, Roberto Accurso as De Valvert, Javier Franco as Carbon, Itxaro Mentxaka as La Duègne/Sister Marthe, Nahuel di Pierro as Le Bret. Conductor: Patrick Fournillier, Orquestra de la Comunitat Valenciana & Cor de la Generalitat Valenciana. Stage director & designer: Michał Znaniecki; recorded live, 8, 11 and 18 February 2007, Palau de les Arts Reina Sofía, Valencia. Blu-ray, DVD (2011): Naxos.
