= Markus Frank =

Markus Frank may refer to:

- Markus L. Frank (born 1969), German horn player and conductor
- Markus Frank (visual effects artist), German visual effects artist
