= Hugh Beresford =

English operatic singer (1925–2020)

Hugh Beresford (17 December 1925 – 23 November 2020) was a British operatic baritone, later Heldentenor.

== Life ==
Beresford, who was of Irish descent, was born in the port town of Birkenhead in what is now the Metropolitan Borough of Wirral in the county of Merseyside. As a child, he sang as a soloist in church concerts at Liverpool Cathedral.

He studied singing at the Royal College of Music in Manchester, at the University of Music and Performing Arts Vienna and had lessons in London, Milan and Düsseldorf with Dino Borgioli, Alfred Piccaver, Melchiorre Luise, Francesco Carino and Wolfgang Steinbrueck. In 1951 he won the Richard Tauber Prize.

Beresford had his first engagement at the Landestheater Linz, where he sang the role of Wolfram von Eschenbach in Tannhäuser as a baritone in 1953. In Linz, he sang among others in Ruggiero Leoncavallo's opera Edipo Re, his last and only posthumously premiered stage work, of which a complete recording was also produced in 1960 by Österreichischer Rundfunk with the ensemble of the Linzer Landestheater. This was followed by engagements at the Opernhaus Graz and the Theater Augsburg. From 1958 to 1960, he sang at the Opernhaus Wuppertal. In 1960, he became a permanent member of the Deutsche Oper am Rhein, where he remained in the ensemble until 1970 and also began his international career. In the 1965/66 season, Beresford sang the title role in Nabucco at the Deutsche Oper am Rhein in each of its new productions, where he "found baritone sequences of harrowing, masculine intensity, especially for the despair of the humiliated and benighted king", and Tonio in Bajazzo.

From 1960, Beresford made several guest appearances at Covent Garden Opera. In May 1961, he made his debut at the Vienna State Opera, alongside Lisa della Casa, as Mandryka in Arabella. He sang at the opera houses in Munich, Stuttgart, Frankfurt and Zurich and also made guest appearances at the Paris Opera. In 1963 and 1966, he took part in the Holland Festival. In the 1963/64 season, he made a guest appearance at the Cologne Opera as Count Tomski in The Queen of Spades In June 1964, he sang his only Vienna premiere at the Vienna State Opera as Mandryka in an Arabella new production conducted by Joseph Keilberth to mark the 100th anniversary of the birth of Richard Strauss. In 1964 and 1965, he made guest appearances at la Monnaie in Brussels as Rigoletto. In 1966, he sang Mandryka at the Teatro La Fenice in Venice with Melitta Muszely as his partner in the title role, and Wolfram at the Teatro Lirico Giuseppe Verdi in Trieste. From 1967, he appeared frequently at the Hamburg State Opera. In 1968, he made guest appearances at the Deutsche Oper Berlin, and in 1970 at the Badisches Staatstheater Karlsruhe. In 1969, he sang Rigoletto in Amsterdam.

Among his main baritone roles were the Verdi characters Rigoletto, who was his "favourite" role, Nabucco, Germont-père, Posa, Graf Luna, Jago, Ford, as well as Alfio in Cavalleria rusticana, Eugene Onegin and Don Giovanni.

In 1970, Beresfeld made the voice and subject change to Heldentenor. He sang at the Cologne Opera from 1971 to 1976 and again from 1978 to 1984. In the 1972/73 season and in the 1973/74 season, he sang Florestan in Fidelio at the Vienna State Opera. At the Bayreuth Festival he took on Tannhäuser in 1972–73, although his performance was controversial with audiences. In 1975, he appeared at the Scottish Opera in Glasgow in the tenor role of Bacchus in Ariadne auf Naxos. In the 1979/80 season, he took over Hermann in a Queen of Spades new production at the Theater Hagen. In the 1980/81 season, the title role in an Othello new production followed at the Hagen Theatre. In 1981, he sang Florestan and Erik in The Flying Dutchman in Cologne. In 1981, he made a guest appearance as Siegmund in Die Walküre in Amsterdam. In the 1982/83 season, he made guest appearances as Kalaf in Turandot at the Stadttheater Bremerhaven and as the "veritable" title character "with stentorian tones" in Otello at the Theater Heidelberg.

As a tenor he sang among others the title role in Peter Grimes, Herod in Salome and Canio.

There are a few recordings of Beresford's voice as a baritone and tenor, among others so-called "cross-sections" of the operas Rigoletto and Margarethe (as Valentin). A live recording of Beresford's performance as Mandryka in Arabella (Venice 1966) was released on CD. There also exists a live recording of a Tannhäuser performance at the Bayreuth Festival in the summer of 1972 with Beresford in the title role under the musical direction of Erich Leinsdorf.

After finishing his stage career, Beresford worked as a music educator. Among his pupils was Roman Sadnik. He died at the end of November 2020 at the age of 94 in his adopted home of Vienna.
