= Nathalie Manfrino =

French soprano

Nathalie Manfrino (born 1977) is a French soprano. For UNIVERSAL- DECCA, she recorded her first disc, "French Heroines" with The Monte-Carlo Philharmonic Orchestra, DECCA label, which received the Golden Orpheus and the "Georg Solti prize". Her second solo recording album, Méditations, is a tribute to Jules Massenet, with the Monte-Carlo philharmonic orchestra conducted by Michel Plasson.

She was given the medal of chevalier of the Ordre des Arts et des Lettres by the minister of culture in 2011.

In November 2001, Nathalie Manfrino makes her debut on stage as Mélisande in Debussy’s "PELLEAS et MELISANDE" at the Marseille Opera House, and in Toulouse's Theatre du Capitole. July 2003 sees Nathalie as Roxane in Alfano’s Cyrano de Bergerac in Montpellier's Opera-Comédie and for the Radio-France Festival (DVD-Deutsche Grammophon). Since, on stage she has been: Marguerite – FAUST Gounod, Roxane – CYRANO Alfano, Michaela – CARMEN Bizet, Sarah-LE REVENANT, Eurydice-ORPHÉE Gluck, Juliette – ROMEO Gounod, Fiordiligi – COSI Mozart, Rozenn – LE ROI D’YS, Manon – MANON Massenet, Mimi – BOHÈME Puccini, Thaïs – THAÏS Massenet, Héro – BÉATRICE et BENEDICT Berlioz, Leïla – PÉCHEURS Bizet, Mireille – MIREILLE Gounod, Lodoiska – LODOISKA Cherubini, Clelia Conti – CHARTREUSE DE PARME Sauguet, la princesse Saamcheddine – MAROUF Henri Rabaud, Gilda – RIGOLETTO Verdi, Violetta – TRAVIATA Verdi.

She has appeared with Plácido Domingo and also Roberto Alagna, notably in the role of Roxane in Alfano's Cyrano de Bergerac. In recordings, she has specialised in rarer French operatic repertoire including forgotten works such as Debussy's Rodrigue et Chimène., Le Roi Artus from Ernest Chausson. On stage, Louise de Mezières from Jules Massenet, La Chartreuse de Parme from Sauguet, Marouf from Rabaud, Le Roi d'Ys from Lalo...

Her repertoire as a lyrical soprano is mostly dedicate to French and Italian operas. But she also sings a lot of sacred music. She has given several concerts all around the world: Rome Caracalla’s Termes; Trondheim Festival (Norway); Palau de les Arts of Valencia (Spain); Auditorium A. Kraus of Las Palmas de Gran Canaria; the Geneva Chamber Orchestra; Smetana Hall of Prague; International Festival of Harare Zimbabwe (Africa); the National Concert hall of Dublin; "La Philarmonie" of Luxembourg; the Bozar in Brussels; Durban (South Africa) and with the Malaysian Philharmonic orchestra of Kuala Lumpur, Korea national opera... She also appears as a special guest singer in a recital in Puerto Rico (DVD).

== Recordings ==
- Cyrano de Bergerac (Alfano). 2CD DG.
- Héroïnes Françaises FRENCH HÉROÏNES: Gounod: Roméo et Juliette, Faust. Massenet: Thaïs, Hérodiade, Manon, Delibes: Lakmé, Bizet Vasco de Gama. Debussy L'enfant prodigue, Rodrigue et Chimène. Lalo Le Roi d'Ys. Chausson Le Roi Arthus. conducted Emmanuel Villaume, Orchestre Philharmonique de Monte Carlo. Decca 2007
- Massenet – arias. MÉDITATIONS: La Vierge, (1880), Marie-Magdeleine (1873), Sapho (1897), Grisélidis (1901), Esclarmonde (1889), Ariane (1906) Cléopâtre. Michel Plasson. Orch. Phil. Monte Carlo. Decca 2012
- Lodoïska, Cherubini, naïve
- vocalise, MESSIAEN

DVD

- Cyrano de Bergerac (Alfano). DG.
