= Sondra Radvanovsky =

American and Canadian soprano (born 1969)

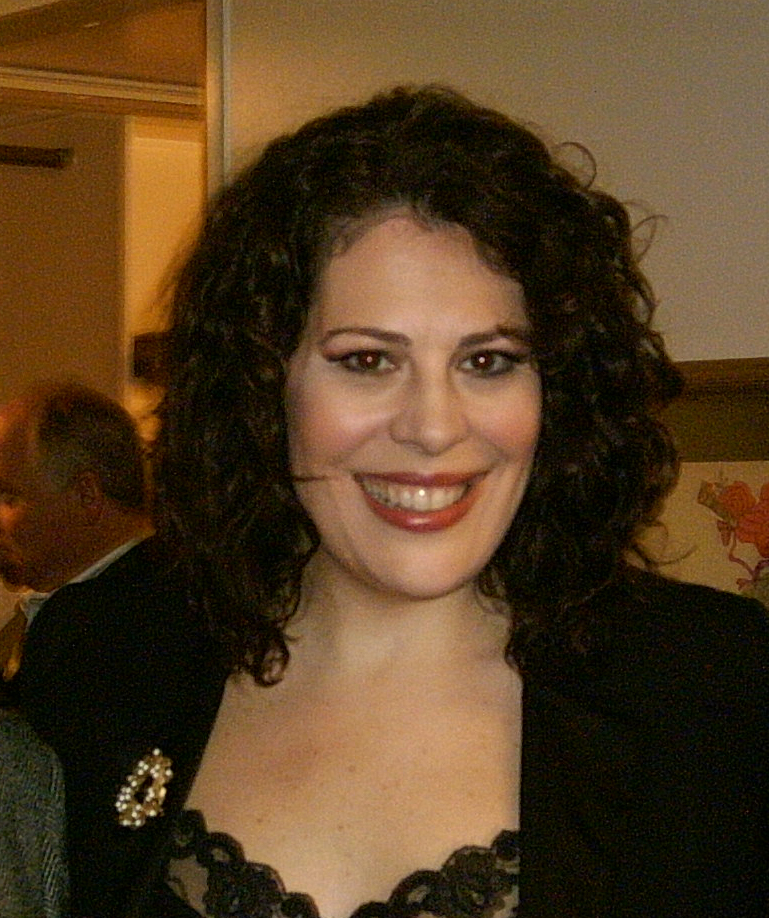
- Radvanovsky in 2022
- Born: April 11, 1969 (age 57); Berwyn, Illinois, U.S.
- Citizenship: United States; Canada (since 2016)
- Education: University of Southern California; University of California, Los Angeles
- Occupation: Operatic soprano
- Years active: 1995–present
- Spouse: Duncan Lear (m. 2001; div. 2022)

Sondra Dee Radvanovsky (born 11 April 1969) is an American-Canadian soprano. Specializing in 19th-century Italian opera, Radvanovsky is widely regarded as a leading interpreter of bel canto, verismo, and the works of Giuseppe Verdi. Her repertoire includes the title roles in Medea, Norma, Tosca, and Rusalka, the Leonoras in Il Trovatore and La Forza del Destino, Lady Macbeth in Macbeth, and Donizetti's three "Tudor Queens."

== Early life and studies ==
Radvanovsky was born in Berwyn, Illinois, to a Czech father and Danish mother. At age 11, she moved to Richmond, Indiana. She studied at Pleasant View School and Richmond High School and then Mission Viejo High School. She sang her first full-length opera, Mimi in Puccini's La bohème, in Richmond at age 21. She studied voice at the University of Southern California for two years and drama at the University of California, Los Angeles for two years, after which she studied privately. She also received training at the Tanglewood Music Center and the University of Cincinnati – College-Conservatory of Music.

In 1995 Radvanovsky won the Metropolitan Opera National Council Auditions and first prize in the Loren L. Zachary Society Competition. In 1997 she won the George London Foundation Competition. Her teachers have included Martial Singher, Ruth Falcon, and Anthony Manoli, who is also her accompanist.

== Career ==
After the National Council Auditions, Radvanovsky enrolled in the Metropolitan Opera's Lindemann Young Artist Development Program. In 1996, she appeared in Rigoletto as Countess Ceprano. After performances in smaller roles there, she came to attention as Antonia in Les contes d'Hoffmann.

She became a regular soloist at the Met, performing in Verdi's Stiffelio, Bizet's Carmen, Verdi's Il Trovatore, La Bohème, and Verdi's La Traviata. In May 1999, she appeared at Houston Grand Opera as Elena in Boito's Mefistofele. In 2000, she performed in Verdi's Luisa Miller at the Spoleto Festival USA. In October 2002, she appeared at the Lyric Opera of Chicago in the title role of Carlisle Floyd's Susannah.

In 2006, she made her debut at the Royal Opera House in London in Alfano's Cyrano de Bergerac opposite Plácido Domingo. In 2009, she sang Leonora in a new production of Il Trovatore at the Metropolitan Opera, and the following year she opened the Canadian Opera Company's season in the title role of Verdi's Aida. In 2011, she was the on-air hostess of a Metropolitan Opera Live in HD broadcast.

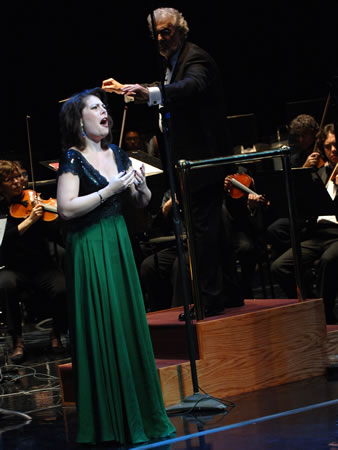
Sondra Radvanovsky in 2008

She first sang Norma, which she called a "perfect role vocally and temperamentally," with Ópera de Oviedo in the 2011/12 season, and received critical and popular acclaim in the role during the 2013/14 season at the Metropolitan Opera. She followed this up during the Met's 2015/16 season with performances of all three queens in Donizetti's "Tudor" operas - Anna Bolena, Maria Stuarda, and Roberto Devereux.

At the Paris Opera, Radvanovsky appeared in the title role of Aida in 2016. Other roles there have included Marguerite in Gounod's Faust, Hélène in Verdi's Les vêpres siciliennes and Elisabetta in Verdi's Don Carlo.

At the Liceu Opera, Barcelona, she appeared in Andrea Chénier on 24 March 2018; after a prolonged ovation for her aria "La mamma morta", the conductor granted her an encore, a practice which is now rare. On 4 July 2018, she repeated the aria "D'amor sull'ali rosee" during a performance of Il Trovatore at the Opéra Bastille in Paris, the first woman - and only the third singer - to sing an encore since the house's opening in 1989. For the 2022–2023 season at the Metropolitan Opera, Radvanovsky sang the title role in the company's first-ever production of Cherubini's Medea, a role she repeated for the 2025–2026 season at Chicago's Lyric Opera. She has also sung Odabella in Verdi's Attila and the title roles of Puccini's Suor Angelica, Tosca, Manon Lescaut and Turandot and Dvorak's Rusalka to acclaim.

During the COVID-19 pandemic, Radvanovsky and fellow soprano Keri Alkema launched a podcast series entitled Screaming Divas with the first episode aired on 24 April 2020.

== Personal life ==
Radvanovsky was introduced to Duncan Lear by tenor Michael Schade. They married in December 2001 and Lear assumed the role as her business manager. She lived in New York while her husband was in Toronto during the first year of marriage, after which they lived together in the suburbs of Greater Toronto, first in Oakville, and then in Caledon, Ontario. She acquired Canadian citizenship in February 2016. In 2022, Radvanovsky and Lear divorced.

== Awards and recognition ==
Radvanovsky won Outstanding Female Performances in Roberto Devereux with the Canadian Opera Company in 2014 Dora Award, while the production itself was awarded the best production. She also won the Female Singer category in the 2nd Annual Excellence in Opera Awards for the same production. She was a recipient of 2015 Opera News Award. On 12 October 2016 she was honored in the annual Opera Canada Awards. She won "Sustained Excellence in Performance" in the 4th Annual Excellence in Opera Awards for the Tudor trilogy at the Met. She won "Outstanding Female Performance" in the 2017 Dora Award for Norma with Canadian Opera Company. She was named the 2018 Vocalist of the Year by magazine Musical America. In June 2018 she was named an Honorary Fellow of the Royal Conservatory of Music.

== Recordings ==
=== Audio ===
- Elena in I vespri Siciliani with Francisco Casanova as Arrigo, Leo Nucci as Monforte, Samuel Ramey as Procida; Frédéric Chaslin conducting The Metropolitan Opera Orchestra & Chorus (Met Opera on Demand, 2004)
- Verdi Arias; Constantine Orbelian conducting Russian Philharmonic Orchestra (Delos, 2010)
- Verdi Opera Scenes with Dmitri Hvorostovsky; Constantine Orbelian conducting Russian Philharmonic Orchestra (Delos, 2011)
- The Three Queens (Donizetti) with Lyric Opera of Chicago Orchestra, conducted by Riccardo Frizza (PENTATONE, 2022)
- Turandot with Jonas Kaufmann, Ermonela Jaho; Antonio Pappano conducting Orchestra dell' Accademia Nazionale di Santa Cecilia (Warner Classics, 2023)
- Puccini: Heroines with Lyric Opera of Chicago Orchestra, conducted by Enrique Mazzola (PENTATONE, 2026)

=== Video ===
- Alfano's Cyrano de Bergerac with Plácido Domingo, Naxos 2009
- Leonora in Il trovatore, The Metropolitan Opera, 2011
- Amelia in Un ballo in maschera, The Metropolitan Opera, 2013
- Norma in Norma, The Gran Teatre del Liceu, 2015
- Queen Elisabeth in Roberto Devereux, The Metropolitan Opera, 2016
- Soprano soloist, Exceptional lyric concert, conducted by Philippe Jordan, Paris Opera, 2016
- Norma in Norma, The Metropolitan Opera, 2018
- Medea in Medea, The Metropolitan Opera, 2022
