= Songs (2012 Plácido Domingo album) =

Studio album by Plácido Domingo
- Released: 2012
- Genre: Popular song
- Label: Sony

Plácido Domingo chronology
Amore Infinito (2008)	Songs (2012)	Verdi baritone arias (2013)

Songs is a 2012 popular song album by Plácido Domingo for Sony Classical. Guests on the album include Katherine Jenkins singing "Come What May", Josh Groban in "Sous le ciel de Paris", Susan Boyle, and Harry Connick Jr. in "Time After Time" as well as a duet with his son Plácido Domingo Jr. The orchestra is conducted by Eugene Kohn and Nazareno Andorno

== Track listing ==
1. "Canción para una reina", Manuel Alejandro
2. "Sous le ciel de Paris", Hubert Giraud; duet with Josh Groban.
3. "Time After Time" Sammy Cahn and Jule Styne; duet with Harry Connick Jr.
4. "Un uomo tra la folla", Vito Pallavicini, Tony Renis Alberto Testa
5. "La chanson des vieux amants", Jacques Brel; duet with Zaz.
6. "Come What May", David Baerwald; duet with Katherine Jenkins.
7. "Bésame Mucho", Consuelo Velázquez; with Chris Botti.
8. "From This Moment On", Robert John Lange Shania Twain; duet with Susan Boyle.
9. "Parla più piano", Nino Rota
10. "Il mio cuore va (My Heart Will Go On)", James Horner Will Jennings; duet with Megan Hilty.
11. "Eternally", Charlie Chaplin
12. "Celos (Jalousie)", Jakob Gade
13. "The Girl from Ipanema", Antonio Carlos Jobim
14. "What a Wonderful World", Bob Thiele George Weiss; duet with Placido Domingo Jr.

== Chart performance ==
Chart	Peak position
Austria	20
Belgium (Wallonia)	139
France	42
New Zealand	19
South Korea	13
Spain	37
UK	78
US	136
