= Roman Sadnik =

Austrian operatic tenor

Roman Sadnik (born 26 February 1963) is an Austrian operatic tenor.

== Life ==
Born in Vienna, Sadnik first trained as an actor before deciding to become a singer. He studied voice at the University of Music and Performing Arts Vienna with Walter Berry. He then took private lessons from Hugh Beresford.

He was engaged by the opera studio of the Vienna State Opera at the beginning of the 1989/90 season. In November 1989, he took part in the world premiere of the opera Die Blinden by Beat Furrer. In April/May 1990, he sang at the Vienna State Opera in Bernd Alois Zimmermann's Die Soldaten. In 1991, he sang Creon in Medea in a production of the free Viennese music theatre ensemble Jugendstiltheater, which premiered in the theatre hall on the grounds of the psychiatric hospital at Steinhof. In 1992, he appeared at the Laxenburg Kultursommer, where he sang the "deftly smart" servant Peppo (in the original: Martino) in the Rossini opera L'occasione fa il ladro with "strikingly powerful bass-baritone excellence". In the 1992/93 season, he took on the role of Captain Sulpice in a new production of the Donizetti opera La fille du régiment at the Landestheater Innsbruck (director Kirsten Harms). In the 1992/93 season, he also sang the bass-baritone part of Mustafa Bey in Rossini's L'italiana in Algeri at the Theater Orchester Biel Solothurn. In the 1990s until about 2000/2001, Sadnik worked full-time as an acting and singing teacher in Vienna.

After his change of voice type, Sadnik initially sang in the role category of "lirico spinto", but finally expanded his repertoire to heldentenor.

In 2002, Sadnik performed the title role in Franco Alfano's Cyrano de Bergerac at the Opernhaus Kiel, where he appeared as Don Cesar in Reznicek's Donna Diana. In the summer of 2005, he sang the part of Cavaradossi in Tosca at the Gut Immling Chiemgau Opera Festival. In the summer of 2006, he made a guest appearance at the Aix-en-Provence Festival, singing the First Armoured in Mozart's The Magic Flute. In May 2007, he made his debut as Menaldo Negroni in Franz Schreker's Die Gezeichneten at the De Nederlandse Opera in Amsterdam. In summer 2007 he sang the role of Jean Valjean in the musical Les Misérables at the Steyr Music Festival. In the 2008/09 season Roman Sadnik made his debut at the Vienna Volksoper as Rittmeister Othmar Brandstetter in Ernst Krenek's Kehraus um St. Stephan, a co-production with the Bregenz Festival. He repeated this role there in the 2009/10 season. At the Landestheater Niederbayern, he took on the title role in Verdi's opera Otello in 2009. In the 2009/10 season he sang at the Opéra de Lyon (Maler/Neger in Lulu), in Amsterdam (De Nederlandse Opera; Nick in La fanciulla del West), at la Scala (as Maler/Neger), at the Gdansk Opera House (title role in Tristan und Isolde) and at the Teatro Massimo Bellini in Catania (as Aegisth in Elektra). At the Wiener Festwochen in June 2010 he was also the Painter in Lulu (director Peter Stein).

In September 2010, Sadnik sang for the first time the double role of Mephistopheles/Agrippa von Nettesheim in Prokofiev's The Fiery Angel at the Concertgebouw Amsterdam. In the 2010/11 season he sang the role of Count Heinrich in Franz Schreker's opera Irrelohe at Oper Bonn. In the 2010/11 season, he took on the title role in Parsifal at the Teatro Massimo Bellini in Catania and at the Tallinn Festival (August 2011). In March/April 2011, he was heard at la Scala in Mozart's Die Zauberflöte as the First Guardsman.

In the 2011/12 season, he appeared among others as Tannhäuser at Theater Bremen, as Der Bucklige in Die Frau ohne Schatten at la Scala (March 2012, conductor: Marc Albrecht) and in April/May 2012 as Laca in Jenůfa at the National Theatre Zagreb. In June/July 2012, he sang the Major in Wozzeck at the Bayerische Staatsoper in Munich, also at the Munich Opera Festival.

In March 2013, he sang Herod in Salome at the Grand Théâtre de Bordeaux; this was followed in May/June 2013 by Tristan at the Theater Magdeburg. In September 2013, he sang at the Bruckner Festival in Linz Elis in Franz Schreker's opera Der Schatzgräber. He also sang the Tambourmajor at the Bavarian State Opera in the 2013/14 season in October 2013. In January 2014 he made his debut at the Opéra Bastille as Nick in Puccini's La Fanciulla del West; his partner as Minnie was Nina Stemme. In spring 2014, he made a guest appearance in Tokyo, as the Drum Major (March/April 2014); he was also cover for Paul in The Dead City (February/March 2014). In June 2014, he sang the role of Burgvogt Schweiker von Gundelfingen in two concert performances of Richard Strauss' one-act opera Feuersnot at the Vienna Volksoper.

In the summer of 2014, he sang the Innkeeper in Richard Strauss' opera Der Rosenkavalier at the Salzburg Festival under the musical direction of Franz Welser-Möst; he repeated this role again in the summer of 2015 at the Salzburg Festival.

In November 2014, he sang the role of Tikhon in Katya Kabanova at the Moravian-Silesian National Theatre in Ostrava. In March 2015 he made his scenic role debut as Paul in The Dead City at the Theater Freiburg. In 2015 he sang Herod in Salome at the Bonn Opera. In November 2015 he makes his debut as Mephistopheles/Agrippa von Nettesheim at the Teatro Colón in Buenos Aires.

Sadnik is also active as a concert singer. Here he sang in particular the tenor parts in Gustav Mahler's Das Lied von der Erde and in his Symphony No. 8, as well as the Verdi Requiem in Hamburg and Munich. Sadnik has participated in various CD productions. There are live recordings of the operas Cyrano de Bergerac and Donna Diana from the Kiel Opera House. He has also recorded the Missa dalmatica by Franz von Suppé (2010).
