= Il bravo =

- Opera by Saverio Mercadante
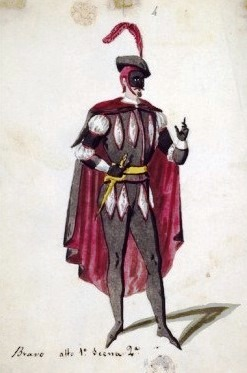
- Costume for the opera's protagonist "Il bravo" (designed for the 1840 Naples production)
- Librettist: Gaetano Rossi
- Language: Italian
- Premiere: 9 March 1839; La Scala, Milan

Il bravo, ossia La Veneziana ("The Assassin, or The Venetian Woman") is an opera in three acts by Saverio Mercadante to an Italian-language libretto by Gaetano Rossi and Marco Marcello. Their libretto was based on the play La Vénétienne by Auguste Anicet-Bourgeois, which was in turn based on James Fenimore Cooper's novel The Bravo. The opera premiered on 9 March 1839 at La Scala, Milan and subsequently played throughout Italy and abroad. The opera was still being occasionally performed and recorded in the 20th century. and was hailed as an "exciting rediscovery" when it was staged by the Wexford Festival in 2018.

== Roles ==
Roles, voice types, premiere cast
Role	Voice type	Premiere cast, 9 March 1839 (Conductor: Eugenio Cavallini)
Carlo ("Il bravo"), a hired assassin	tenor	Domenico Donzelli
Violetta, an orphan from Genoa	soprano	Eugenia Tadolini
Teodora, a mysterious Venetian woman	soprano	Sofia Dall'Oca-Schoberlechner
Pisani, an exiled Venetian patrician	tenor	Andrea Castellan
Foscari, a Venetian patrician	baritone	Pietro Balzar
Cappello, a Venetian patrician	tenor	Antonio Benciolini
Michelina, Teodora's maid	soprano	Angela "Angiolina" Villa
Marco, Teodora's gondolier	bass	Eutimio Polonini
Luigi, Foscari's servant	bass	Luigi Quattrini
Messenger	tenor	Napoleone Marconi
The Doge of Venice, Venetian senators, knights, counsellors, citizens, artisans, gondoliers, commedia dell'arte players, soldiers, guards, servants, pages, and squires

== Summary ==
In order to save his father's life, Carlo has accepted to become a henchman and to serve the government of Venice. When ordered to murder Teodora, he finds that the latter is his former wife : he tried to kill her because he thought (mistakenly) she had betrayed him. Foscari, a patrician, was in love with Teodora, and now loves her daughter, Violetta, but the latter is in love with Pisani, an exiled patrician. The lovers manage to escape, while Teodora kills herself in the hope of saving Carlo's father's life. Carlo, however, discovers that his father is already dead.

== Recordings ==
- 1976: Orchestra and Chorus of the Teatro dell'Opera di Roma, Gabriele Ferro (conductor); William Johns (Il bravo), Miwako Matsumoto (Violetta), Maria Parazzini (Teodora), Paolo Washington (Foscari), Antonio Savastano (Pisani), Gino Sinimberghi (Cappello), Loris Gambelli (Marco), Mario Macchi (Luigi), Giovanna di Rocco (Michelina). Recorded live. Label: Warner Fonit
- 1990: Orchestra Internazionale d'Italia, Slovak Philharmonic Chorus, Bruno Aprea (conductor); Dino Di Domenico (Il bravo), Janet Perry (Violetta), Adelisa Tabiadon (Teodora), Stefano Antonucci (Foscari), Sergio Bertocchi (Pisani), Leonardo De Lisi (Cappello), Ambrogio Riva (Marco), Giuseppe De Matteis (Luigi), Maria Cristina Zanni (Michelina). Recorded live. Label: Nuova Era
