= Melitta Muszely =

Austrian opera singer (1927–2023)

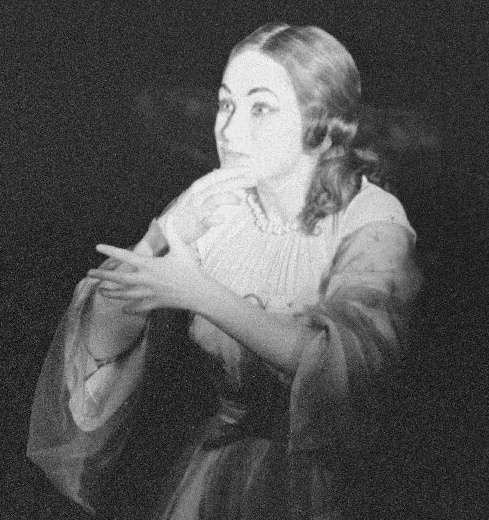
- Muszely as Antonia in Offenbach's Hoffmanns Erzählungen, 1958
- Born: 13 September 1927; Vienna, Austria
- Died: 18 January 2023 (aged 95); Vienna, Austria
- Education: Wiener Musikakademie
- Occupations: Operatic soprano; voice teacher
- Organizations: Hamburg State Opera; Komische Oper Berlin

Melitta Muszely (German pronunciation: [meˈlɪta ˈmʊseli]; 13 September 1927 – 18 January 2023) was an Austrian operatic soprano and a voice teacher. She made a career based in Germany, mainly at the Hamburg State Opera with guest contracts to the Komische Oper Berlin and the Vienna State Opera, among others. She took part in world premieres, and performed internationally in Europe. She appeared as all four female characters in Offenbach's Hoffmanns Erzählungen in the legendary 1958 production by Walter Felsenstein, and sang recitals until 2008.

== Career ==
Muszely's family originally came from Hungary. She was born in Vienna, and studied at the Konservatorium der Stadt Wien: piano with Roland Rautenstrauch, and voice with Maria Freiberg-Marx.

In 1950, she made her debut at the Stadttheater Regensburg. In 1952, she moved to the Opernhaus Kiel, and from 1954 to 1968 she was a member of the Hamburg State Opera. There she took part in several opera premieres, including Ernst Krenek's Pallas Athene weint (1955) and Klebe's Figaro läßt sich scheiden (1963).

Muszely had several guest contracts, among others with the Berlin State Opera and the Komische Oper Berlin. In 1958, she portrayed four female characters (Olympia, Antonia, Giulietta, Stella) in Offenbach's Hoffmanns Erzählungen at the Komische Oper Berlin in the legendary production by Walter Felsenstein. In the opera, the poet tells three stories of frustrated love while waiting for Stella. In 1970, she again played the four figures in Felsenstein's DEFA film version of the opera.

Muszely in Hoffmanns Erzählungen, 1958

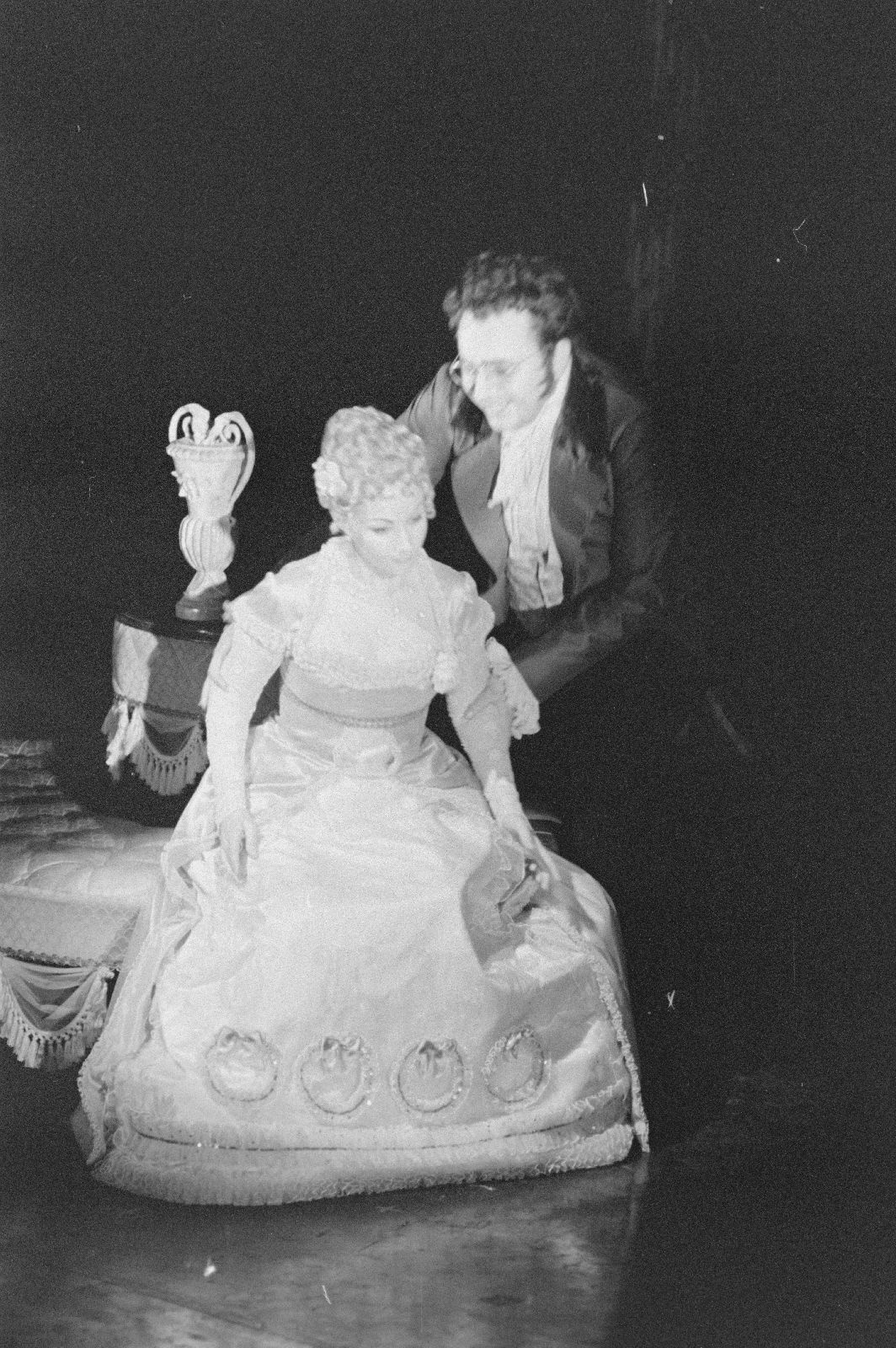
Olympia, with Hanns Nocker as Hoffmann

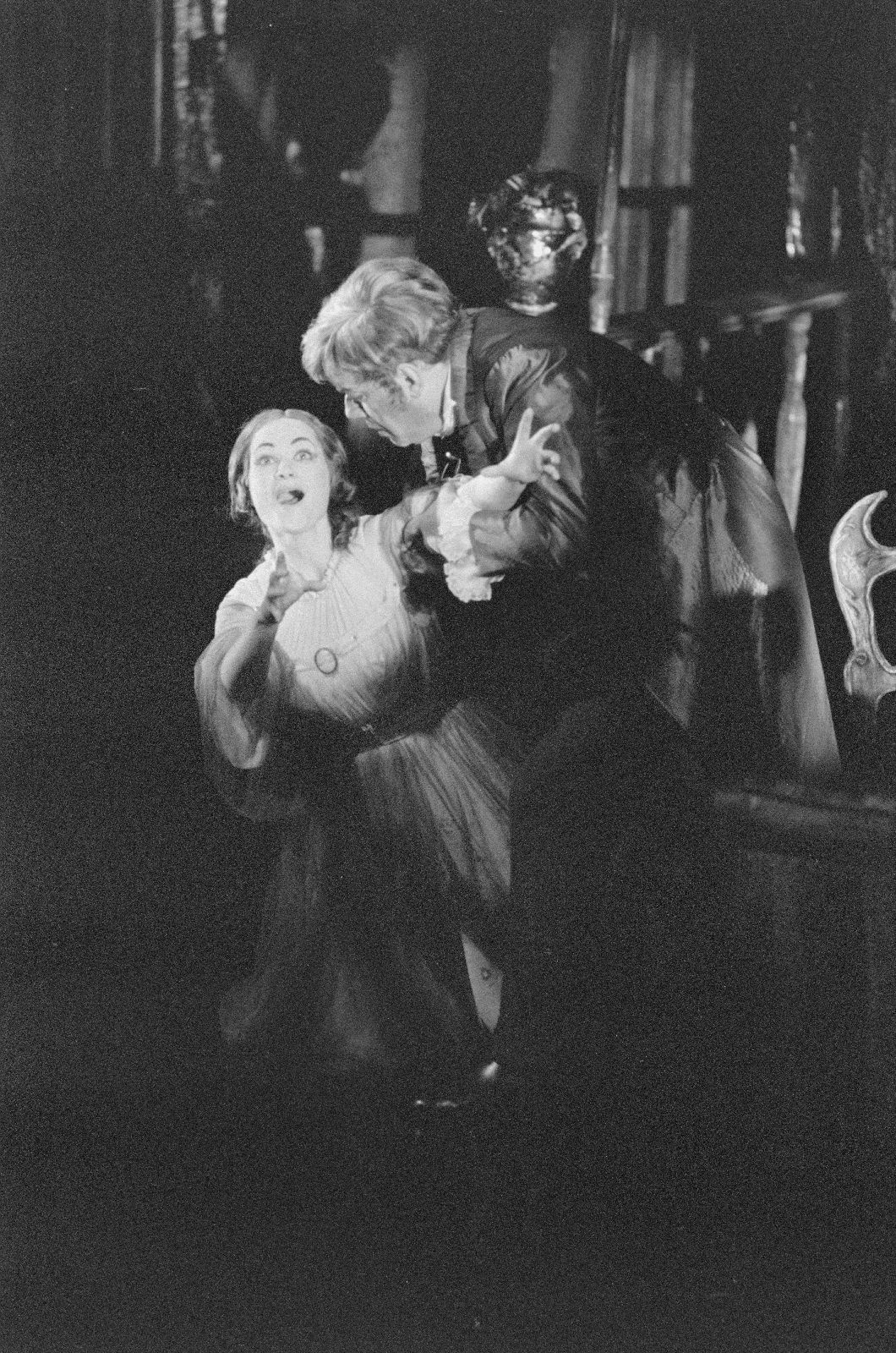
Antonia, with Hans Reinmar as her father Crespel

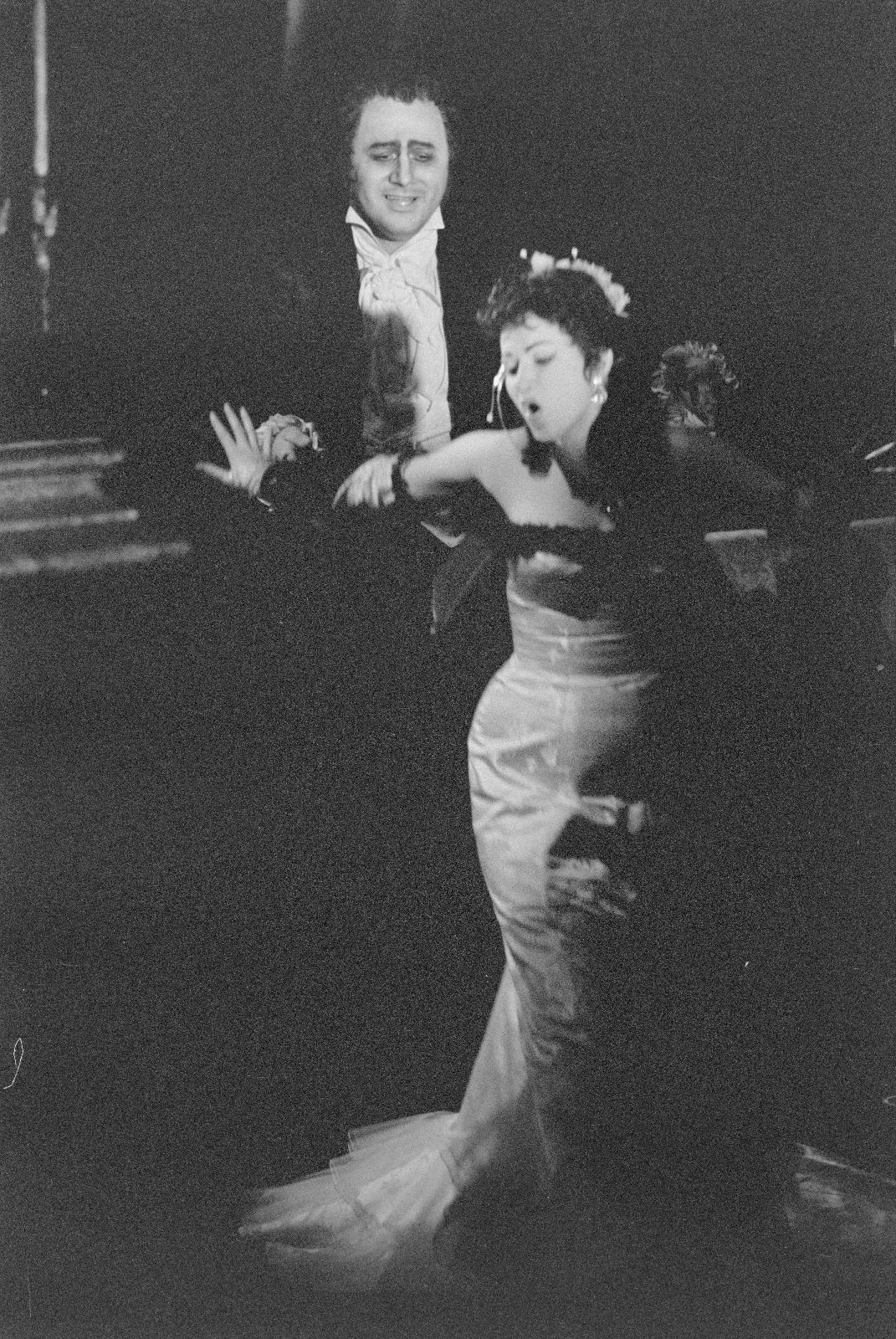
Giulietta, with Nocker

Muszely appeared at the Vienna State Opera from 1963 to 1967, in the Mozart roles Pamina in Die Zauberflöte, Donna Elvira in Don Giovanni and Susanna in Le nozze di Figaro. She also appeared there as Marzelline in Beethoven's Fidelio, as Marie in Smetana's Die verkaufte Braut, in the title role Violetta Valéry in Verdi's La Traviata, as Rosalinde in Die Fledermaus by Johann Strauss and as Sophie in Der Rosenkavalier by Richard Strauss.

International guest performances took Muszely to the Zurich Opera House and opera stages of Paris and Venice, among others. She appeared in Amsterdam in 1954 as the Queen of the Night in Die Zauberflöte. She performed at the Maggio Musicale, in 1956 as both Woglinde and the Voice of a Forest Bird in Wagner's Der Ring des Nibelungen, and in 1961 the title role of Arabella by Richard Strauss. She appeared as a guest at the Teatro San Carlos in Lisbon as Arabella and Marie, and in 1967 in the title role of Dvorák's Rusalka. She performed at the Strasbourg Opera in La traviata and as Pamina.

Festival performances included Parasha in Strawinsky's Mavra at the Edinburgh Festival of 1956, Rameau's Castor et Pollux at the 1962 Schwetzingen Festival, Giunia in Mozart's Lucio Silla at the 1964 Salzburg Festival, the Wife in Schoenberg's Von heute auf morgen at the 1965 Wiener Festwochen, and Zelmire in Gluck's L'ivrogne corrigé at the Festival of Flanders the same year. Her roles included Fiorilla in Rossini's Il Turco in Italia, Tatjana in Tchaikovsky's Eugene Onegin, Mimi in Puccini's La bohème and the title role of Manon Lescaut.

Muszely was also a lieder and concert singer, and a voice teacher. Pianists in her recitals included Erik Werba, Kurt Rapf and Christian Heitler. She appeared in recitals until 2008.

== Personal life ==
Muszely was married to Alfred Filippi, who was also her manager. They lived in Vienna from 1971. When her husband became ill in 1972, she retired from the stage but kept singing concerts and recitals. She kept teaching until her death.

Muszely died in Vienna on 18 January 2023, aged 95.

== Repertoire ==
Muszely became known mainly as a coloratura soprano but also performed lyric soprano repertoire. She was regarded as a specialist for Mozart roles, but also for characters by Richard Strauss, such as Sophie and the title role of Arabella. She also performed in rarely performed operas, such as the title role in Busoni's Turandot.

== Recordings ==
Muszely's musical work, which has been transmitted through radio recordings, live recordings and records, has been partially re-released on CD in recent years. Muszely also recorded numerous operettes for radio, often as a partner of Fritz Wunderlich: Lehár's Der Zarewitsch and The Land of Smiles, and Leo Fall's Die Rose von Stambul. Recordings include:

- Carl Maria von Weber: Der Freischütz (excerpts), with Muszely, Horst Günter, Sándor Kónya, Arnold van Mill, James Pease, Ernst Wiemann, conductor: Wilhelm Brückner-Rüggeberg, NDR Symphonieorchester (1957)
- Bedřich Smetana: Die verkaufte Braut, excerpts with Barry McDaniel, Cvetka Ahlin, Muszely, Martti Talvela, Ruth Hesse, Rudolf Schock, Kurt Böhme; choir and orchestra of the Deutsche Oper Berlin, conductor: Heinrich Hollreiser, LP, Album, Electrola
- Georges Bizet: Carmen, with Christa Ludwig, Rudolf Schock, Hermann Prey, Melitta Muszely, Iwan Rebroff, conductor: Horst Stein, Berliner Symphoniker, CD, EMI
- Richard Strauss: Arabella, with Muszely in the title role, Liselotte Hammes (Zdenka), Hugh Beresford (Mandryka), Willi Brokmeier (Matteo) and others, conducted by Meinhard von Zallinger (1966, live from La Fenice)

== Literature ==
- Karl-Josef Kutsch, Leo Riemens: Großes Sängerlexikon. Third, extended edition, K. G. Saur, Munich 1999. Volume 4: Moffo-Seidel, p. 2472.
