= William Johns =

American tenor (born 1936)

William Johns (born 2 October 1936) is an American tenor who sang leading roles in the opera houses of Europe and the United States in a career spanning more than 25 years. Several of his live performances in Germany and Italy during the 1970s have been preserved on CD, including the title roles in Alfano's Cyrano de Bergerac and Mercadante's Il bravo.

== Life and career ==
Johns was born in Tulsa, Oklahoma. He attended Capitol Hill High School in Oklahoma City and then studied vocal performance and music at Oklahoma City University, followed by further study in New York. A national finalist in the 1965 Metropolitan Opera National Council Auditions, he made his professional début in 1967 at Lake George Opera as Rodolfo in La bohème. That same year he went to Germany and was primarily based there throughout the 1970s, first as a company soloist at the Bremen Opera (1967–1971), and then at the National Theatre Mannheim (1971–1975) and the Cologne Opera (1975–1979). He sang in five productions the Bayreuth Festival, initially in smaller roles such as 2nd noble of Brabant in Lohengrin (1968), 4th Esquire in Parsifal (1969), and Augustin Moser in Die Meistersinger von Nürnberg (1968 and 1969), but returned there in 1987 in the leading role of Walther von Stolzing in Die Meistersinger (one performance).

The late 1970s and 1980s saw several major house and festival debuts in Europe and the United States. Johns's first appearance at Lyric Opera of Chicago was in 1976 as Hoffmann in Les Contes d'Hoffmann. He later returned there as Walther von Stolzing in Die Meistersinger (1977), Bacchus in Ariadne auf Naxos (1981), and the title role in Otello (1985). He made his Metropolitan Opera debut in 1979 as Don José in Carmen and went on to appear there in 28 performances through 1993, primarily in dramatic tenor and Wagnerian roles. His last Met performance was in the title role of Siegfried. Other major house debuts during this period included the Paris Opera in 1985 as Tristan in Tristan und Isolde, La Scala in 1986 as The Emperor in the Die Frau ohne Schatten, and the Royal Opera House in 1987 as Bacchus in Ariadne auf Naxos.

== Recordings ==
- Alfano: Cyrano de Bergerac – (as Cyrano). RAI National Symphony Orchestra, Maurizio Arena (conductor). Label: Opera D'oro
- Mayr: Medea in Corinto – (as Giasone). Teatro San Carlo Orchestra and Chorus, Maurizio Arena (conductor). Label: Myto Records
- Mercadante: Il bravo (as il bravo). Teatro dell'Opera di Roma Orchestra and Chorus, Gabriele Ferro (conductor). Label: Warner Fonit
- Puccini: Messa di Gloria (tenor soloist). Symphonic Orchestra and Chorus of the Gulbenkian Foundation of Lisbon, Michel Corboz. (conductor). Label: Erato
- Wagner: Die Meistersinger von Nürnberg – (as Augustin Moser). Bayreuth Festival Orchestra and Chorus, Karl Böhm (conductor). Label: Orfeo D'Or
