= Orquestra de la Comunitat Valenciana =

Orchestra based in Valencia, Spain

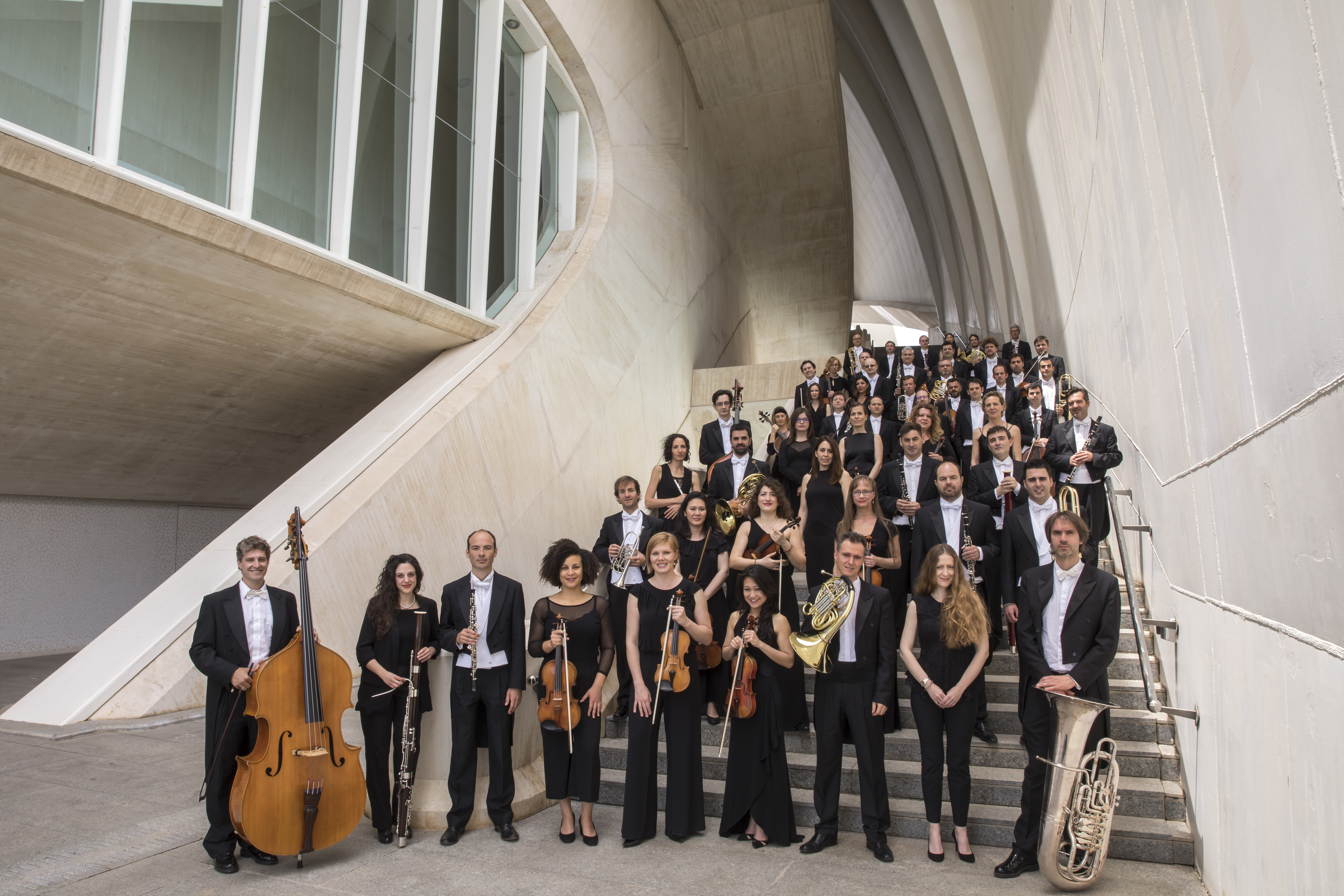
Orquesta de la Comunitat Valenciana on stairs of Palau de les Arts Reina Sofía

The Orquestra de la Comunitat Valenciana (Spanish: Orquesta de la Comunidad Valenciana, English translation 'Orchestra of the Region of Valencia'), is an orchestra based in Valencia, Spain. It is the resident orchestra of Valencia's Palau de les Arts Reina Sofía.

== History ==
The orchestra was created in 2006 to be the orchestra of the new opera house, the Palau de les Arts Reina Sofía. The first chief conductor of the orchestra was Lorin Maazel, from 2006 to 2011. Omer Meir Wellber served as the orchestra's next chief conductor, from 2011 to 2014. In 2015, Roberto Abbado and Fabio Biondi became joint chief conductors of the orchestra. Biondi served in the post through 2018, and Abbado through 2019.

On 1 September 2021, James Gaffigan became chief conductor of the orchestra, with an initial contract of 4 years. In December 2024, the orchestra announced that Gaffigan is to stand down as its chief conductor at the close of the 2024–2025 season.

In 2022, Sir Mark Elder first guest-conducted the orchestra. In January 2025, the orchestra announced the appointment of Elder as its next music director, effective 1 September 2025, with an initial contract of two years.

== Chief conductors ==
- Lorin Maazel (2006–2011)
- Omer Meir Wellber (2011–2014)
- Roberto Abbado (2015–2019; jointly held with Fabio Biondi from 2015 to 2018)
- Fabio Biondi (2015–2018; jointly held with Roberto Abbado)
- James Gaffigan (2021–2025)
- Mark Elder (2025–present)

== See also ==
- Valencia Orchestra
- Cor de la Generalitat Valenciana
- Verdi baritone arias (Plácido Domingo album)
