= Verdi baritone arias (Plácido Domingo album) =

Verdi

Studio album by Plácido Domingo
- Released: 2013
- Genre: Opera
- Label: Sony

Plácido Domingo chronology
Songs (2012)	Verdi (2013)	Encanto del Mar (2014)

Verdi is a 2013 album of baritone arias by the 72-year-old Plácido Domingo, returning to the baritone register of his youth. The album, the first collection of baritone arias by the singer, was released by Sony Classics on 27 August 2013. Domingo is accompanied by the Cor de la Generalitat Valenciana and the Orquestra de la Comunitat Valenciana conducted by Pablo Heras-Casado. The album won a Latin Grammy in 2014 for Best Classical Album.

== Reviews ==
It was favourably received by The Independent, the Toronto Star, and other reviewers.

== Track listing ==
1. Macbeth (opera), Act IV, Macbeth aria: 'Perfidi! All'Anglo contro me v'unite! ... Pieta, rispetto, amore'
2. Rigoletto, Act I, Scene 3, Rigoletto's scena: 'Pari siamo! Io la lingua'
3. Rigoletto, Act II, Scene 2, Rigoletto's Aria: 'Si, la mia figlia! ... Cortigiani, vil razza dannata'
4. Un ballo in maschera, Act III, Scene 1, Renato's aria: 'Alzati! La tuo figlio ... Eri tu che macciavi quell'anima'
5. La traviata, Germont Act II, Scene 1, Aria: 'Di Provenza il mar, il suol'
6. Simon Boccanegra, Act I, Scene 2: 'Abbasso le spade! ... Plebe! Patrizi! Popolo dalla feroce storia!'
7. Simon Boccanegra, Act I, Scene 2: 'Ecco la spada'
8. Ernani, Act III, Carlo V Scene and Cavatina: 'E questo il loco?'
9. Ernani, Act III, Carlo V Scene and Cavatina: 'Oh, de' verd'anni miei'
10. Il trovatore, Part II, Scene 2, Conte di Luna, Ferrando Scena ed Aria: 'Tutto e deserto'
11. Il trovatore, Part II, Scene 2, Conte di Luna Scena ed Aria: 'Il balen del suo sorriso' –
12. Il trovatore, Part II, Scene 2, Conte di Luna, Ferrando, Scena ed Aria: 'Qual suono! Oh ciel! ... Per me, ora fatale'
13. Don Carlo, Act IV, Scene 2: Rodrigo, Don Carlo 'Son io, mio Carlo'
14. Don Carlo, Act IV, Rodrigo Scene 2: 'Per me giunto e il di supremo'
15. Don Carlo, Act IV, Don Carlo, Rodrigo Scene 2: 'Che parli tu di morte?'
16. La forza del destino, Act III, Scene 2, Carlo Scena ed Aria: 'Morir! Tremenda cosa'
17. La forza del destino, Act III, Scene 2, Carlo Scena ed Aria: 'Urna fatale del mio destino'
18. La forza del destino, Act III, Scene 2, Scena ed Aria: 'E s'altra prova rinvenir potessi? ... Egli e salvo! Gioia immens"

== Chart performance ==
Chart (2013)	Peak position	Weeks on chart
Austria	27	2
Belgium (Flanders)	199	1
Spain	43	6
US Classical Albums	18	3
