= Palau de les Arts Reina Sofía =

Performing arts venue in Valencia, Spain

Coordinates: 39°27′28″N 0°21′20″W

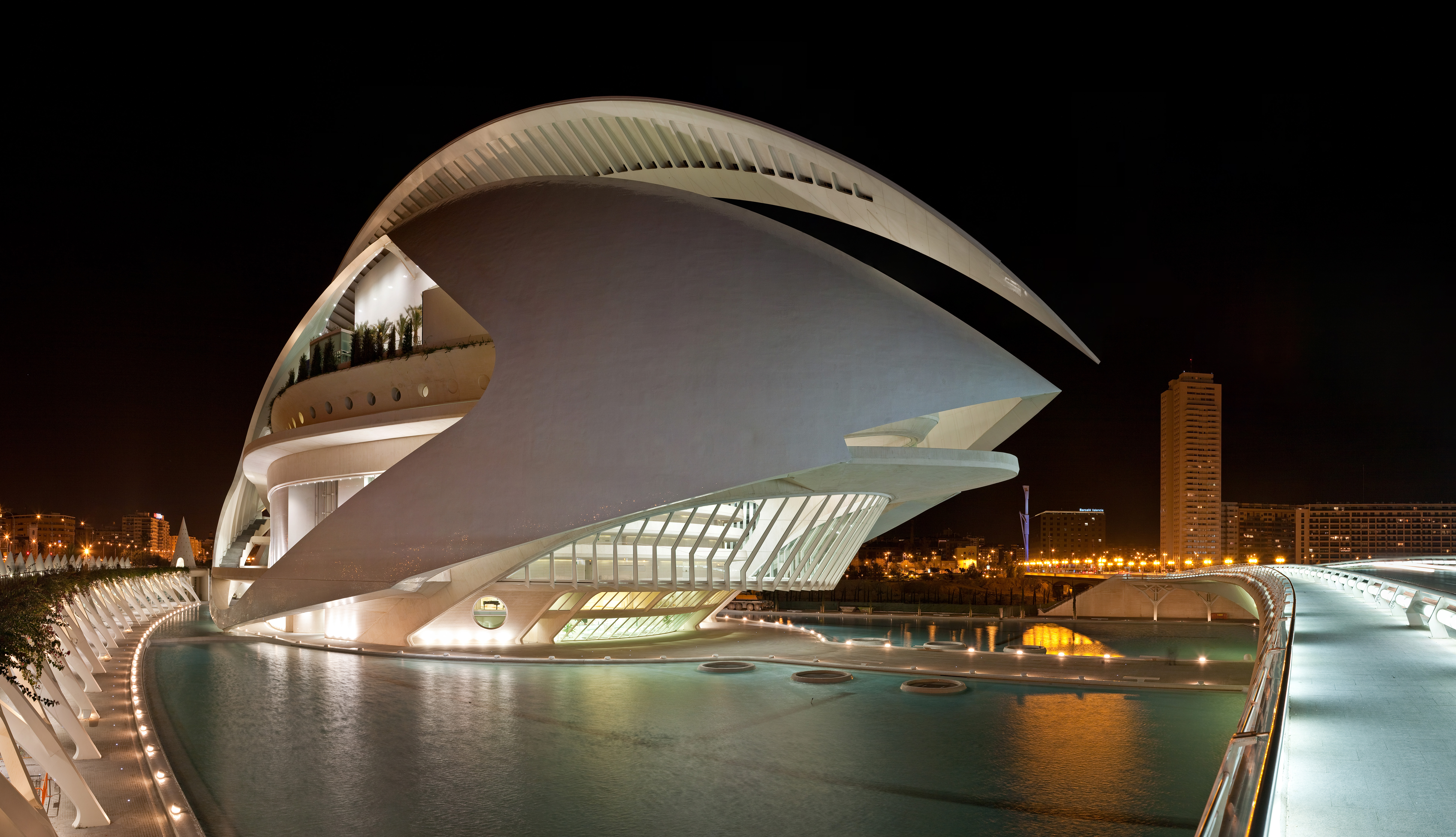
- Palau de les Arts Reina Sofía in Valencia, Spain, photographed at night with the city in the background
- Interactive map of the Palau de les Arts Reina Sofía area

General information
- Type: Arts complex
- Location: Valencia, Spain
- Opened: 8 October 2005

Design and construction
- Architect: Santiago Calatrava Valls
- Main contractor: Dragados and Necso

Palau de les Arts Reina Sofía (Valencian: Palau de les Arts Reina Sofia; (Note: Valencian pronunciation: [paˈlaw ðe lez ˈaɾdz ˈrejna soˈfi.a].) Spanish: Palacio de las Artes Reina Sofía; (Note: Spanish pronunciation: [paˈlaθjo ðe las ˈaɾtes ˈrejna soˈfi.a].) anglicised as "Queen Sofía Palace of the Arts") is an opera house, performing arts centre, and urban landmark designed by Santiago Calatrava to anchor the northwest end of the City of Arts and Sciences in Valencia, Spain. It opened on 8 October 2005; its first opera staging was of Beethoven's Fidelio on 25 October 2006. Tenor and conductor Plácido Domingo has maintained a special relationship with the Palau since its founding and has established a young singers training program there.

== The building ==
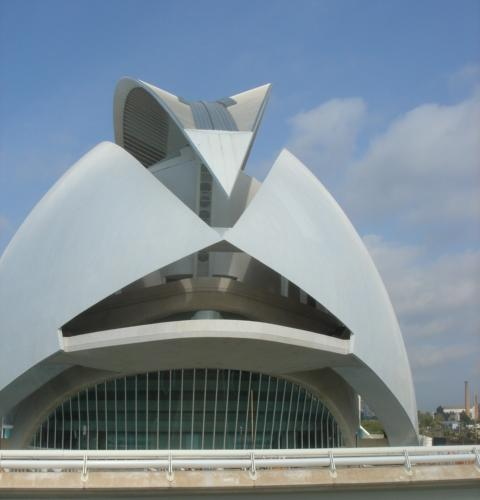
Palau de les Arts Reina Sofía, rear SE elevation

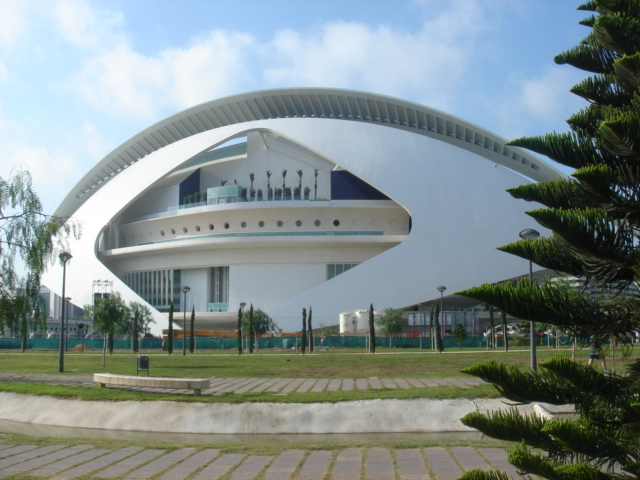
Palau de les Arts Reina Sofía, side SW elevation

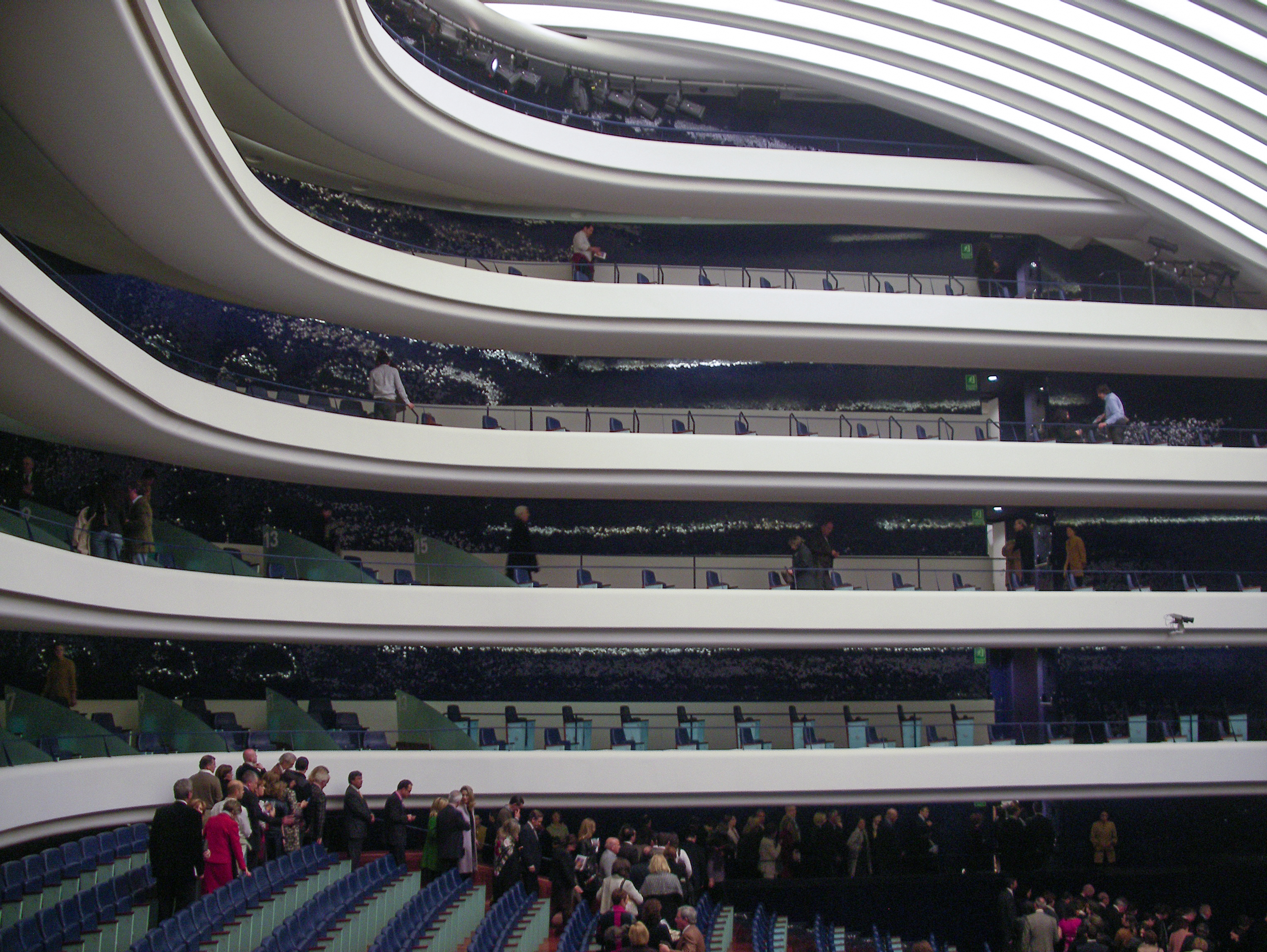
Sala Principal of Palau de les Arts Reina Sofía

Queen Sofía Palace of the Arts is the last major structure built of a grand City of Arts and Sciences concept designed by the Valencia-born and internationally known architect Santiago Calatrava, which began in 1995. The building was constructed by a joint venture of Dragados and Necso. It was opened officially on 8 October 2005 by Queen Sofía of Spain.

The building rises 14 stories above ground and includes three stories below ground. Its height is 75 metres (246 ft), being the tallest opera house in the world. Under the metallic, expansive curved-roof structure, 230 m (755 ft) in length, the 40,000 m^{2} (431,000 ft^{2}) building contains four auditoriums:

- The Sala Principal (Main Hall) seats 1,470 people and functions primarily for opera, but it may be converted for dance and other performing arts. The hall has four tiers of seating, one of the largest stages in the world equipped with all major facilities, and the third largest orchestra pit in the world, being capable of housing 120 musicians. The stage has room to build two complete opera settings which makes it possible to play two different operas in two days.

The building suffered a number of incidents after its opening, which hampered initial productions. The first of these was the collapse of the main stage platform while it was bearing the complete set of Jonathan Miller's production of Don Giovanni in December 2006. That forced the Palau to cancel the last performance of La Bohème and all of La Belle et la Bête, and meant that the management had to reschedule the remainder of the inaugural opera season. In November 2007, the entire cultural complex suffered a series of floods. The recently re-built stage platform was paralysed once again because almost 2 m (7 ft) of water entered the lower floors of the building and wrecked the electronics and the motors of the complex stage equipment, forcing the management to reschedule the season again, delaying the premiere of Carmen and canceling the opera 1984.

- The Auditorium is located above the Main Hall. It seats 1,420 people and its facilities include sound and video systems capable of projecting displays of events taking place in venues below it. Officially given to the managing trust during the 2007–2008 season, it is a spectacular venue with multiple uses, from multi-genre concerts to political rallies.
- Aula Magistral is capable of seating 400 people and is used for chamber music performances and conferences.
- Martí i Soler Theatre was constructed below the base of the Palau's plume and seats 400 people. It is used for theatre productions and as a training centre for the main auditoriums. This hall suffered vast damage during the 2007 flooding and its opening was delayed. No equipment had been installed before the flooding, however, so the estimated cost for reconstruction was much lower than it would have been shortly thereafter. It is named after the Valencian composer Vicente Martín y Soler.

== The company ==
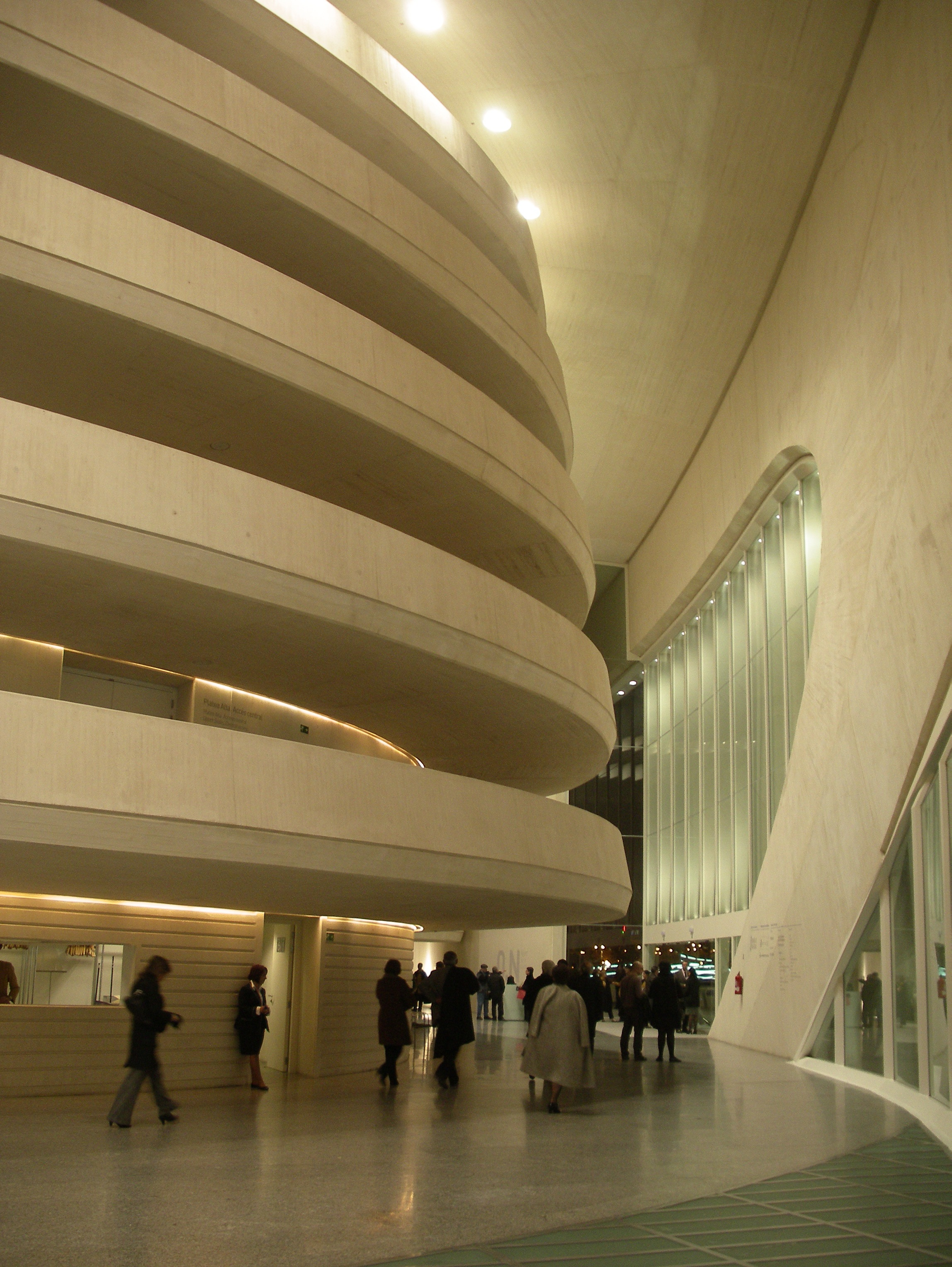
Foyer to the main hall of Palau de les Arts

From its inception in 2005 until early 2015, administration of the company was under the General Directorship of Helga Schmidt, formerly of London's Royal Opera House from 1973 to 1981. Schmidt attracted some major artists to be involved with the Palau. Among them is Zubin Mehta, who leads an annual music and opera festival, the Festival del Mediterráneo, which began in 2007; the late Lorin Maazel, who became music director of the company before his death; and Plácido Domingo, who brought his Operalia competition to the Palau in October 2007, and performs there regularly (Cyrano de Bergerac in 2007, Iphigénie en Tauride in 2008, Die Walküre in 2009, etc.). He has appeared with the company every season since its creation.

The resident orchestra at the Queen Sofía Palace of the Arts is the Valencian Community Orchestra. The theatre's first season was 2006–2007. During the first and second seasons the theatre staged seven or eight operas per season, as well as an operetta, a zarzuela, and vocal recitals. During the 2008–2009 season theatre staged seven operas and one zarzuela, in performances that mainly conducted by Lorin Maazel. Soloists included Plácido Domingo, Christopher Ventris, Vittorio Grigolo, Maria Guleghina, and Cristina Gallardo-Domâs. The 2008-2009 Festival del Mediterrani included the complete Der Ring des Nibelungen cycle conducted by Zubin Mehta, again with Plácido Domingo.

The Queen Sofía company promotes symphonic concerts, opera galas, and vocal recitals. The company also hosts the Centre de Perfeccionament Plácido Domingo, an advanced training program of international draw for young opera artists, named in honor of Plácido Domingo. The program is run under the famous tenor's aegis.

On 21 January 2015, Spanish police arrested the company's general director, Helga Schmidt, for alleged financial irregularities at the house. She was relieved of her duties with the company on the same day. Davide Livermore has since assumed Schmidt role as general director. In March 2015, the company appointed Roberto Abbado and Fabio Biondi as joint music directors.

== See also ==
- Orquestra de la Comunitat Valenciana
- City of Arts and Sciences
- Auditorio de Tenerife
- Spanish architecture
