= Markus L. Frank =

German horn player and conductor

Markus Lukas Frank (born 1969) is a German horn player and conductor.

== Life and career ==
Born in Schwäbisch Hall, Frank studied at the Hochschule für Musik Detmold from 1988, with scholarships from the Studienstiftung des deutschen Volkes, the Deutscher Musikrat and the Deutsche Mozart-Gesellschaft, among others. He participated in several music competitions and was a prize-winner at the Internationaler Instrumentalwettbewerb Markneukirchen, the Geneva International Music Competition and the 1994 ARD International Music Competition.

After his studies, he was horn player with the NDR Sinfonieorchester Hamburg. During this time, he also played as solo hornist with other orchestras and also studied conducting with Klauspeter Seibel at the Hochschule für Musik und Theater Hamburg. From 1998, he was 2nd Kapellmeister at the Opernhaus Kiel and played during this time with the Philharmonisches Orchester Kiel Cyrano de Bergerac by Franco Alfano.

In 2003, he became 1st Kapellmeister and Generalmusikdirektor (GMD) at the Anhaltisches Theater in Dessau. He has made guest appearances at the Staatsoper Hannover and conducted the ballets Swan Lake by Tchaikovsky and Le sacre du printemps by Igor Stravinsky. In 2005, he made his debut with Humperdinck's Hänsel und Gretel at the Deutsche Oper Berlin, where he later conducted Die Zauberflöte by Mozart several times.

Frank became general music director of the Loh-Orchester Sondershausen in 2008. Since 2012/2013, he has held a teaching position for orchestral conducting at the Hochschule für Musik Franz Liszt, Weimar.

As of the 2016/2017 season, he was appointed GMD of the Anhaltische Philharmonie at the Anhaltisches Theater Dessau as successor to Antony Hermus.

== Recordings ==
- Franco Alfano: Cyrano de Bergerac, Philharmonisches Orchester Kiel, cpo, Georgsmarienhütte 2002, DNB-IDN 358703972.
- Engelbert Humperdinck: Hänsel und Gretel, Anhaltische Philharmonie, Arthaus-Musik, Halle (Saale) 2008, DNB-IDN 993681573.
- Walter Braunfels: Don Juan/Sinfonische Variationen, Philharmonisches Orchester Altenburg-Gera, Capriccio, 2016.
