= Cor de la Generalitat Valenciana =

Choir in Valencia, Spain

The Cor de la Generalitat Valenciana (CGV), founded as Cor de Valencia in 1987, is the main local-government funded choir in Valencia.

== Selected discography ==
- 2013 Verdi baritone arias (Plácido Domingo album)
